= Territorial control of Donetsk Oblast during the Russo-Ukrainian war =

This page provides information on the most recently known control of localities in Donetsk Oblast during the ongoing Russo-Ukrainian War, which started in 2014 and escalated with the Russian invasion of Ukraine in 2022. It includes all larger localities across the oblast, as well as some smaller localities close to current or recent lines of contact.

== Bakhmut Raion ==
Name	Pop.	Hromada	Held by	As of	More information
Andriivka	71	Bakhmut	Russia	16 Sep 2024	Recaptured by Russia between around 28 November – 1 December 2022. Recaptured by Ukraine between 14–15 September 2023. Claimed by Russia on 23 May 2024. Confirmed captured by Russia on 16 September 2024.
Bakhmut	72,310	Bakhmut	Russia	23 May 2023	See Battle of Artemivsk (2014), Battle of Bakhmut (2022-2023); Captured by Donetsk PR in April 2014. Recaptured by Ukraine on 6 July 2014. Recaptured by Russia on 20 May 2023.
Bakhmutske	612	Soledar	Russia	27 Dec 2022	Captured by Russia 27 December 2022
Berestove	1,278	Soledar	Russia	28 Jul 2022	Captured by Donetsk PR in July 2022.
Bohdanivka	77	Chasiv Yar	Russia	8 Apr 2024	Contested by Russia between before 17 January – 8 April 2024. Recaptured by Russia on 8 April 2024.
Chasiv Yar	12,557	Chasiv Yar	Russia	7 Aug 2024	See Battle of Chasiv Yar; Pressured by Russia between 4 April – 17 May 2024. Contested by Russia since 17 May 2024. Captured by Russia on 7 August 2025.
Dachne	70	Toretsk	Russia	1 Jun 2025	Contested by Russia on 23 May 2025. Recaptured by Russia on 1 June 2025.
Druzhba	1,860	Toretsk	Russia	5 Nov 2024	Pressured by Russia between around 18 June – 2 July 2024. Contested by Russia between around 3 July – 4 November 2024. Claimed captured by Russia on 31 August 2024. Captured by Russia by 5 November 2024.
Hryhorivka	92	Chasiv Yar	Russia	11 Jan 2025	Claimed captured by Russia on 10 September 2024. Confirmed captured by Russia on 11 January 2025.
Ivanivske	1,369	Bakhmut	Russia	4 Apr 2024	Contested by Russia between around 23 February – 23 March 2024. Recaptured by Russia around 23 March 2024.
Ivano-Darivka	23	Zvanivka	Russia	19 Jul 2024	Captured by Russia around 17 July 2024.
Kalynivka	542	Chasiv Yar	Russia	18 Nov 2024	Pressured by Russia between around 12–30 May 2024. Contested by Russia between around 30 May 2024. Captured by Russia by 18 November 2024.
Katerynivka	670	Illinivka	Russia	27 Aug 2025	
Khromove	833	Bakhmut	Russia	31 Dec 2023	Recaptured by Russia on 29 November 2023.
Klishchiivka	512	Bakhmut	Russia	17 Jun 2024	Captured by Russia on 19 January 2023. Recaptured by Ukraine between 17–22 September 2023. Contested by Russia between around 19 – late May 2024. Recaptured by Russia between around late May – 17 June 2024.
Kodema	590	Svitlodarsk	Russia	6 Sep 2022	Captured by Russia 6 September 2022.
Krasna Hora	584	Bakhmut	Russia	11 Feb 2023	Recaptured by Russia on 11 February 2023.
Luhanske	2,174	Svitlodarsk	Russia	26 May 2022	Captured by Russia May 2022.
Myronivskyi	7,331	Svitlodarsk	Russia	23 May 2022	Captured by Russia on 23 May 2022
Nelipivka	977	Toretsk	Russia	31 Jan 2025	Claimed contested by Russia starting 19 August 2024. Confirmed contested by Russia between around 5 September – October 2024. Claimed captured by Russia on 30 September 2024. Captured by Russia by 18 October 2024. Contested by Ukraine between around 4 November 2024 – January 2025. Recaptured by Russia in January 2025.
New York	9,735	Toretsk	Russia	7 Oct 2024	Pressured by Russia between around 18 June – 2 July 2024. Contested by Russia between around 3 July – September 2024. Claimed captured by Russian sources on 18 August 2024. Captured by Russia in September 2024.
Novoluhanske	3,700	Svitlodarsk	Russia	26 May 2022	Captured along with Vuhlehirske Power Plant by Russia/DPR on 26 July 2022
Novospaske	1,009	Toretsk	Russia	15 Jul 2025	Captured by Russia on 14-15 July 2025.
Orikhovo-Vasylivka	227	Soledar	Contested	11 Jan 2025	Contested by Russia since around 11 January 2025. Claimed captured by Russia on 9 February 2025.
Paraskoviivka	2,810	Soledar	Russia	18 Feb 2023	See Battle of Artemivsk; Captured by Donetsk PR during the Battle of Artemivsk. Recaptured by Ukraine on 6 July 2014. Recaptured by Russia on 18 February 2023.
Pivdenne	1,404	Toretsk	Russia	6 Sep 2024	Contested by Russia between around 29 June – August 2024. Claimed captured by Russia on 30 July 2024. Confirmed captured by Russia on 5 September 2024.
Pivnichne	9,024	Toretsk	Russia	21 Sep 2024	Pressured by Russia between 18–21 June 2024. Contested by Russia between around 21 June – 20 September 2024. Claimed captured by Russia on 31 August 2024. Confirmed captured by Russia on 21 September 2024.
Pokrovske	1,333	Bakhmut	Russia	27 Jul 2022	
Rozdolivka	740	Soledar	Russia	3 Aug 2024	Pressured by Russia between around 14 May – 11 June 2024. Contested by Russia between around 12 June – 19 July 2024. Claimed captured by Russian sources around 28 June 2024. Captured by Russia between around 19 July – 3 August 2024.
Sakko i Vantsetti	3	Soledar	Russia	6 Feb 2023	Recaptured by Russia on 31 January 2023.
Serebrianka	50	Siversk	Russia	16 Aug 2025	Contested by Russia since 17 June 2025. Captured by Russia on 16 July 2025.
Shcherbynivka	3,266	Toretsk	Russia	11 Aug 2025	Contested by Russia since around 18 October 2024. Captured by Russia on 11 August 2025.
Shumy	95	Toretsk	Russia	23 Jun 2024	Recaptured by Russia on 21 June 2024.
Soledar	10,692	Soledar	Russia	16 Jan 2023	See Battle of Soledar; Captured by Donetsk PR in April 2014. Recaptured by Ukraine in July 2014. Recaptured by Russia 16 January 2023.
Spirne	80	Soledar	Russia	3 Jul 2024	Contested by Russia around August–September 2022. Contested by Russia between around 27 December 2023 – 16 July 2024. Claimed captured by Russia since 30 June 2024. Confirmed captured by Russia on 17 July 2024.
Sukha Balka	649	Toretsk	Russia	23 Apr 2025	Contested by Russia before 23 April 2025. Captured by Russia 23 April 2025.
Svitlodarsk	11,281	Svitlodarsk	Russia	24 May 2022	Captured by Russia/DPR on 24 May 2022.
Toretsk	30,914	Bakhmut	Russia	7 Aug 2025	See Battle of Toretsk; Pressured by Russia between around 5 July – 21 August 2024. Contested by Russia since around 22 August 2024. Captured by Russia on 7 August 2025.
Valentynivka	84	Toretsk	Russia	14 Apr 2025	Contested by Russia before 14 April 2025. Captured by Russia 14 April 2025.
Vasiukivka	601	Soledar	Ukraine	15 Dec 2023	
Verkhniokamianske	960	Zvanivka	Russia	9 Oct 2024	Claimed pressured by a Russian source starting around 11 June 2024. Claimed captured by Russia on 2 October 2024. Captured by Russia around 7 October 2024.
Vesele	102	Soledar	Russia	6 Feb 2024	Recaptured by Russia on 18 January 2024.
Zaitseve	1,160	Bakhmut	Russia	16 Nov 2022	Capture by Russia claimed 6 October 2022.
Zalizne	4,928	Toretsk	Russia	6 Sep 2024	Pressured by Russia between around 18 June – 12 July 2024. Contested by Russia between around 13 July – 4 September 2024. Claimed captured by Russian sources on 15 August 2024. Claimed captured by Russia on 19 August 2024. Confirmed captured by Russia on 5 September 2024.

== Donetsk Raion ==
Name	Pop.	Hromada	Held by	As of	More information
Donetsk	905,364	Donetsk	Russia	22 Feb 2022	See March 2022 Donetsk attack Captured by Donetsk PR 7 April 2014.
Ilovaisk	17,620	Ilovaisk	Russia	20 Feb 2015	See Battle of Ilovaisk (2014); Captured by Donetsk PR in mid-April 2014. Recaptured by Ukraine 19 August 2014. Recaptured by Donetsk PR 1 September 2014.
Makiivka	340,337	Makiivka	Russia	9 Mar 2022	Captured by Donetsk PR on 13 April 2014.

== Horlivka Raion ==
Name	Pop.	Hromada	Held by	As of	More information
Debaltseve	24,316	Debaltseve	Russia	20 Feb 2015	See Battle of Debaltseve (2015); Captured by Donetsk PR in mid-April 2014. Recaptured by Ukraine 29 July 2014. Recaptured by Donetsk PR 18 February 2015.
Horlivka	241,106	Horlivka	Russia	9 Mar 2022	See Battle of Horlivka (2014); Captured by Donetsk PR in mid-April 2014.
Yenakiieve	77,053	Yenakiieve	Russia	24 Jun 2015	Captured by Donetsk PR 13 April 2014.

== Kalmiuske Raion ==
Name	Pop.	Hromada	Held by	As of	More information
Azov	209	Novoazovsk	Russia	6 Sep 2014	Captured by Donetsk PR 23 May 2014. Recaptured by Ukraine 15 June 2014. Recaptured by Donetsk PR 6 September 2014.
Novoazovsk	11,104	Novoazovsk	Russia	28 Aug 2014	See Battle of Novoazovsk (2014); Captured by Donetsk PR in mid-April 2014. Recaptured by Ukraine in June 2014. Recaptured by Donetsk PR 27 August 2014.
Olenivka	4,534	Dokuchaievsk	Russia	1 May 2022	See Olenivka prison massacre Captured by Donetsk PR in September 2014

== Kramatorsk Raion ==
Name	Pop.	Hromada	Held by	As of	More information
Bila Hora	78	Kostiantynivka	Russia	22 Jul 2022	Contested by Russia on 7 July 2025. Captured by Russia on 22 July 2025.
Bohorodychne	794	Sviatohirsk	Ukraine	11 Sep 2022	See Sloviansk offensive Captured by Russia 11 July 2022. Recaptured by Ukraine 11 September 2022.
Dibrova	253	Lyman	Ukraine	19 Sep 2022	
Drobysheve	2,639	Lyman	Ukraine	1 Oct 2022	
Druzhkivka	55,088	Druzhkivka	Ukraine	4 May 2022	
Dyliivka	402	Kostiantynivka	Russia	24 Jun 2025	Contested by Russia before 31 May 2025. Captured by Russia 31 May 2025. Contested by Ukraine since around 7 June 2025. Recaptured by Russia by 24 June 2025.
Karpivka	263	Lyman	Ukraine	27 Sep 2022	
Katerynivka	77	Lyman	Russia	8 Apr 2025	Contested by Russia before 8 April 2025. Captured by Russia 8 April 2025.
Kolodiazi	270	Lyman	Ukraine	29 Sep 2022	
Kostiantynivka	68,792	Kostiantynivka	Ukraine	10 Mar 2022	Captured by Donetsk PR in mid-April 2014. Recaptured by Ukraine 7 July 2014.
Korovii Yar	721	Lyman	Ukraine	24 Sep 2022	
Kramatorsk	150,084	Kramatorsk	Ukraine	4 May 2022	See Battle of Kramatorsk (2014), Kramatorsk railway station attack Captured by Donetsk PR 12 April 2014. Recaptured by Ukraine 5 July 2014.
Krymky	70	Kramatorsk	Russia	22 May 2022	
Lyman	20,469	Lyman	Ukraine	1 Oct 2022	See Battle of Krasnyi Lyman (2014), Battle of Lyman (September–October 2022); Captured by Donetsk PR in mid-April 2014. Recaptured by Ukraine 5 June 2014. Recaptured by Russia/DPR 27 May 2022. Recaptured by Ukraine on 1 October 2022.
Lypove	78	Lyman	Russia	22 Jul 2022	Contested by Russia before 22 July 2025. Captured by Russia on 22 July 2025.
Nova Poltavka	502	Illinivka	Russia	17 May 2025	Contested by Russia since 5 May 2025. Captured by Russia 17 May 2025.
Nove	880	Lyman	Russia	30 Apr 2025	Contested by Russia before 17 April 2025. Captured by Russia 30 April 2025.
Novoolenivka	245	Novodonetske	Russia	6 May 2025	Contested by Russia since 2 May 2025. Captured by Russia 6 May 2025.
Novosadove	32	Lyman	Russia	22 Oct 2024	Recaptured by Russia on 22 October 2024.
Novoselivka	1,255	Lyman	Ukraine	28 Sep 2022	Captured by Russia in May 2022; Recaptured by Ukraine 28 September 2022.
Oleksandrivka	499	Lyman	Russia	22 May 2022	
Oleksandropil	194	Illinivka	Russia	17 May 2025	Contested by Russia since 14 May 2025. Captured by Russia 17 May 2025.
Ozerne	263	Lyman	Ukraine	4 Sep 2022	Captured by Russia in June 2022; Recaptured by Ukraine 4 September 2022.
Raihorodok	3,342	Mykolaivka	Ukraine	9 Sep 2022	
Ridkodub	415	Lyman	Contested	27 Jun 2025	Contested by Russia since 12 May 2025. Captured by Russia 29 May 2025. Contested by Ukraine since around 27 June 2025.
Romanivka	150	Illinivka	Russia	25 May 2025	Contested by Russia before 25 May 2025. Captured by Russia 25 May 2025.
Shandryholove	1,035	Lyman	Ukraine	27 Sep 2022	
Shchurove	264	Lyman	Ukraine	19 Sep 2022	
Siversk	11,068	Siversk	Ukraine	25 May 2022	
Sloviansk	106,972	Sloviansk	Ukraine	4 May 2022	See Murder of Pentecostals in Sloviansk (2014), Siege of Sloviansk; Captured by Donetsk PR in mid-April 2014. Recaptured by Ukraine 5 July 2014.
Sosnove	235	Lyman	Ukraine	16 Sep 2022	Recaptured by Ukraine 15 September 2022.
Staryi Karavan	191	Lyman	Ukraine	9 Sep 2022	Captured by Russia in May 2022. Recaptured by Ukraine in September 2022.
Sviatohirsk	4,309	Sviatohirsk	Ukraine	11 Sep 2022	Captured by Russia/DPR between 8 and 14 June 2022. Recaptured by Ukraine 11 September 2022.
Terny	764	Lyman	Russia	19 Jan 2025	Captured by Russia 23 April 2022. Recaptured by Ukraine first week of October 2022. Pressured by Russia between around ? – late April 2024. Contested by Russia between around 30 October 2024 – January 2025. Claimed captured by Russia on 14 January 2025. Confirmed captured by Russia on 19 January 2025.
Torske	1,652	Lyman	Russia	25 Aug 2025	Captured by Russia 25 August 2025.
Yablunivka	811	Illinivka	Russia	24 Jul 2025	Contested by Russia on 28 May 2025. Captured by Russia on 24 July 2025.
Yampil	1,944	Lyman	Ukraine	30 Sep 2022	Captured by Russia/DPR in May 2022. Contested between 28 September and 1 October 2022. Recaptured by Ukraine on 1 October 2022.
Yarova	1,255	Lyman	Ukraine	21 Sep 2022	
Zarichne	2,571	Lyman	Ukraine	28 Sep 2023	Captured by Russia/DPR between 24–27 April 2022. Recaptured by Ukraine in the first week of October 2022.
Zelena Dolyna	89	Lyman	Ukraine	29 Sep 2022	
Zorya	976	Illinivka	Russia	1 Jun 2025	Contested by Russia before 25 May 2025. Captured by Russia 1 June 2025.

== Mariupol Raion ==
Name	Pop.	Hromada	Held by	As of	More information
Mariupol (Note: Hero City of Ukraine)	431,859	Mariupol	Russia	17 May 2022	See Battle of Mariupol (2014), 2014 offensive, 2015 attack, Siege of Mariupol, Hospital airstrike, Theatre airstrike Partially captured by Donetsk PR 9 May 2014. Recaptured by Ukraine 13 June 2014; Recaptured by Russia/DPR on 16 May 2022.

== Pokrovsk Raion ==
Name	Pop.	Hromada	Held by	As of	More information
Arkhanhelske	285	Ocheretyne	Russia	4 May 2024	Contested by Russia between around 30 April – 3 May 2024. Recaptured by Russia on 3 May 2024.
Avdiivka	31,940	Avdiivka	Russia	17 Feb 2024	See Battle of Avdiivka (2017), Battle of Avdiivka (2022–2024); Captured by Donetsk PR in mid-April 2014. Mostly recaptured by Ukraine 21 July 2014. Recaptured by Russia on 17 February 2024.
Avdiivske	2,208	Ocheretyne	Russia	10 Apr 2024	Contested by Russia/DPR between summer 2022 – 9 April 2024. Recaptured by Russia around 9 April 2024.
Baranivka	58	Hrodivka	Russia	11 Feb 2025	Captured by Russia by 11 February 2025.
Bazhane	274	Novohrodivka	Russia	18 Aug 2024	Captured by Russia around 18 August 2024.
Bazhane Druhe	240	Marinka	Russia	19 Oct 2024	Claimed captured by Russian sources on 7 October 2024. Captured by Russia by 19 October 2024.
Bazhane Pershe	192	Marinka	Russia	7 Oct 2024	Contested by Russia between around 16 September – 6 October 2024. Captured by Russia by 7 October 2024.
Berdychi	267	Ocheretyne	Russia	28 Apr 2024	Contested by Russia between around 28 February – 27 April 2024. Recaptured by Russia between around 20–27 April 2024.
Blahodatne	1,274	Ocheretyne	Russia	15 Aug 2024	Pressured by Russia between around 27–31 July 2024. Contested by Russia between around 1–13 August 2024. Captured by Russia around 14 August 2024.
Bohdanivka	26	Pokrovsk	Russia	24 May 2025	Contested by Russia before 24 May 2025. Captured by Russia 24 May 2025.
Dachne	1,684	Kurakhove	Russia	6 Feb 2025	Contested by Russia between 17 January – 5 February 2025. Captured by Russia on 6 February 2025.
Dalne	403	Kurakhove	Russia	21 Nov 2024	Contested by Russia between around 11–20 November 2024. Captured by Russia around 21 November 2024.
Dobropillia	28,170	Dobropillia	Ukraine	24 Feb 2022	
Halytsynivka	1,111	Novohrodivka	Russia	3 Sep 2024	Contested by Russia between around 31 August – 2 September 2024. Likely captured by Russia around 3 September 2024.
Heorhiivka	1,167	Marinka	Russia	14 Jun 2024	Contested by Russia between around 15 January – 5 June 2024. Recaptured by Russia between around 5–14 June 2024.
Hirnyk	10,357	Kurakhove	Russia	27 Oct 2024	Claimed contested by Russian sources starting 18 September 2024. Confirmed contested by Russia between around 26 September – 26 October 2024. Captured by Russia on 27 October 2024.
Hostre	557	Kurakhove	Russia	4 Oct 2024	Contested by Russia between around 12 September – 2 October 2024. Claimed captured by Russian sources on 22 September 2024. Confirmed captured by Russia by 3 October 2024.
Hrodivka	2,299	Hrodivka	Russia	21 Oct 2024	Pressured by Russia between around 4–12 August 2024. Contested by Russia between around 13 August – 20 October 2024. Claimed captured by Russia on 7 October 2024. Confirmed captured by Russia on 21 October 2024.
Illinka	440	Kurakhove	Russia	13 Nov 2024	Contested by Russia between 7–12 November 2024. Captured by Russia on 13 November 2024.
Ivanivka	669	Hrodivka	Russia	13 Aug 2024	Pressured by Russia between around 25–31 July 2024. Contested by Russia between around 1–12 August 2024. Captured by Russia around 13 August 2024.
Izmailivka	199	Kurakhove	Russia	24 Oct 2024	Captured by Russia on 23 October 2024.
Kalynove	219	Novohrodivka	Russia	27 Aug 2024	Captured by Russia on 27 August 2024.
Karlivka	414	Novohrodivka	Russia	30 Aug 2024	Claimed contested by a Russian source starting 14 June 2024. Contested by Russia between around 22 June – 29 August 2024. Captured by Russia around 30 August 2024.
Katerynivka	778	Marinka	Russia	3 Nov 2024	Contested by Russia between around 4 October – 2 November 2024. Claimed captured by Russia on 29 October 2024. Confirmed captured by Russia on 3 November 2024.
Keramik	339	Ocheretyne	Russia	4 May 2024	Pressured by Russia around 26 April 2024. Contested by Russia between around 27 April – early May 2024. Fully recaptured by Russia between around 28 April – 3 May 2024.
Komyshivka	365	Novohrodivka	Russia	22 Aug 2024	Captured by Russia around 21 August 2024.
Koptieve	88	Shakhove	Russia	4 Jul 2025	Contested by Russia before 4 July 2025. Captured by Russia 4 July 2025.
Kostiantynivka	1,293	Marinka	Russia	28 Aug 2024	Pressured by Russia between around 5 June – 23 July 2024. Contested by Russia between around 24 July – 26 August 2024. Likely captured by Russia on 27 August 2024.
Kotlyarivka	103	Pokrovsk	Russia	12 May 2025	Contested by Russia since 9 May 2025. Captured by Russia 12 May 2025.
Krasnohorivka	14,917	Marinka	Russia	10 Sep 2024	See Battle of Krasnohorivka; Contested by Russia between 8 April – 8 September 2024. Captured by Russia on 9 September 2024.
Krutyi Yar	107	Hrodivka	Russia	29 Sep 2024	Recaptured by Russia around 29 September 2024.
Krynychne	617	Ocheretyne	Russia	24 Feb 2024	Recaptured by Russia on 24 February 2024.
Kurakhove	18,220	Kurakhove	Russia	26 Dec 2024	See Battle of Kurakhove; Pressured by Russia between around 3–28 October 2024. Contested by Russia between 29 October – 24 December 2024. Likely captured by Russia on 25 December 2024.
Kurakhivka	2,600	Kurakhove	Russia	31 Oct 2024	Contested by Russia on 30 October 2024. Claimed captured by Russian sources on 30 October 2024. Confirmed captured by Russia on 31 October 2024.
Lozuvatske	17	Hrodivka	Russia	26 Jul 2024	Contested by Russia between around 16–25 July 2024. Captured by Russia around 26 July 2024.
Lysivka	799	Pokrovsk	Russia	27 Aug 2025	Contested by Russia since around 11 September 2024. Claimed captured by Russian sources on 12 September 2024. Visually confirmed contested since 2 October 2024.
Maksymilianivka	2,171	Marinka	Russia	21 Oct 2024	Pressured by Russia between around 14 June – 29 June 2024. Contested by Russia between around 29 June – 19 October 2024. Claimed captured by Russia on 17 October 2024. Confirmed captured by Russia on 20 October 2024.
Malynivka	561	Hrodivka	Russia	5 Jul 2025	Contested by Russia before 5 July 2025. Captured by Russia 5 July 2025.
Marinka	10,722	Marinka	Russia	25 Dec 2023	See Battle of Marinka (2015), Battle of Marinka (2022–2023); Captured by Donetsk PR in mid-April 2014. Recaptured by Ukraine on 5 August 2014. Contested by Russia between around spring 2022 and 24 December 2023. Recaptured by Russia on 24–25 December 2023.
Mezhove	36	Ocheretyne	Russia	22 Aug 2024	Captured by Russia around 19 August 2024.
Mykhailivka	1,269	Novohrodivka	Russia	1 Sep 2024	Pressured by Russia between around 18–25 August 2024. Contested by Russia between around 26–31 August 2024. Likely captured by Russia around 1 September 2024.
Mykolaivka	101	Hrodivka	Russia	16 Oct 2024	Contested by Russia between around 24 September – 9 October 2024. Captured by Russia around 10 October 2024.
Mykolaivka	805	Novohrodivka	Russia	24 Aug 2024	Contested by Russia between around 14–16 August 2024. Claimed captured by Russian sources on 16 August 2024. Captured by Russia between around 17–23 August 2024.
Mykolaivka	364	Hrodivka	Russia	16 May 2025	Contested by Russia before 16 May 2025. Captured by Russia 16 May 2025.
Myrnohrad	46,098	Myrnohrad	Ukraine	29 Aug 2024	Pressured by Russia since around 29 August 2024.
Myrolyubivka	597	Hrodivka	Russia	16 May 2025	Contested by Russia since 19 April 2025. Captured by Russia 16 May 2025.
Netailove	1,141	Ocheretyne	Russia	21 May 2024	Pressured by Russia between around 16–27 April 2024. Contested by Russia between around 28 April – 18 May 2024. Recaptured by Russia between around 18–20 May 2024.
Nevelske	283	Ocheretyne	Russia	10 Aug 2024	Recaptured by Russia around 12 March 2024. Recaptured by Ukraine before 4 May 2024. Pressured by Russia between around 14 May – 11 June 2024. Contested by Russia between around 12 June – 8 August 2024. Recaptured by Russia on 9 August 2024.
Novobakhmutivka	191	Ocheretyne	Russia	25 Apr 2024	Contested by Russia between 23–24 April 2024. Recaptured by Russia on 24 April 2024.
Novoekonomichne	2,763	Hrodivka	Russia	25 Jul 2025	Contested by Russia since 7 July 2025. Captured by Russia on 25 July 2025.
Novoielyzavetivka	620	Pokrovsk	Russia	31 Dec 2024	Contested by Russia between around 23–30 December 2024. Captured by Russia around 31 December 2024.
Novohrodivka	14,037	Novohrodivka	Russia	27 Aug 2024	Pressured by Russia between around 14–21 August 2024. Contested by Russia between around 22–26 August 2024. Captured by Russia around 27 August 2024.
Novokalynove	521	Ocheretyne	Russia	27 Apr 2024	Contested by Russia between 16–27 April 2024. Recaptured by Russia around 27 April 2024.
Novomykhailivka	1,439	Marinka	Russia	23 Apr 2024	Contested by Russia between around 6 February – 21 April 2024. Captured by Russia around 22 April 2024.
Novomykolaivka	231	Udachne	Russia	30 Jun 2025	Contested by Russia on since 11 June 2025. Captured by Russia on 30 June 2025.
Novooleksandrivka	693	Hrodivka	Russia	11 Jun 2024	Pressured by Russia between around 6 May – 7 June 2024. Contested by Russia between around 8–10 June 2024. Recaptured by Russia around 10 June 2024.
Novooleksandrivka	135	Pokrovsk	Russia	11 May 2025	Contested by Russia before 11 May 2025. Captured by Russia 11 May 2025.
Novooleksiivka	177	Selydove	Russia	7 Nov 2024	Contested by Russia between 4–6 November 2024. Captured by Russia on 7 November 2024.
Novopokrovske	64	Ocheretyne	Russia	13 Jun 2024	Pressured by Russia between around 7 May – 9 June 2024. Contested by Russia between around 10–12 June 2024. Recaptured by Russia between 12–13 June 2024.
Novoselivka	541	Ocheretyne	Russia	14 May 2022	
Novoselivka Persha	942	Ocheretyne	Russia	29 Jul 2024	Pressured by Russia between around 12 June – 10 July 2024. Contested by Russia between around 11–28 July 2024. Captured by Russia around 29 July 2024.
Novoserhiivka	362	Udachne	Russia	24 Jun 2025	Contested by Russia before 24 June 2025. Captured by Russia 24 June 2025.
Novotroitske	614	Pokrovsk	Russia	13 Dec 2024	Contested by Russia between around 6–10 December 2024. Captured by Russia around 11 December 2024.
Ocheretyne	3,378	Ocheretyne	Russia	4 May 2024	See Battle of Ocheretyne; Pressured by Russia between 17–21 April 2024. Contested by Russia between around 22–30 April 2024. Fully recaptured by Russia around 30 April 2024.
Oleksandropil	305	Ocheretyne	Russia	2 Apr 2025	Contested by Russia since 24 March 2025. Captured by Russia 2 April 2025.
Orlivka	297	Novohrodivka	Russia	14 Aug 2024	Captured by Russia on 14 August 2024.
Orlivka	874	Ocheretyne	Russia	25 Mar 2024	Recaptured by Russia between around 29 February – 19 March 2024.
Ostrivske	323	Kurakhove	Russia	16 Oct 2024	Contested by Russia between around 3 – 14 October 2024. Claimed captured by Russia on 11 October 2024. Captured by Russia by 15 October 2024.
Panteleimonivka	77	Ocheretyne	Russia	31 Mar 2025	Contested by Russia before 31 March 2025. Captured by Russia 31 March 2025.
Paraskoviivka	52	Ocheretyne	Russia	15 Jun 2024	Pressured by Russia between around 5–18 May 2024. Contested by Russia between around 19 May – 5 June 2024. Captured by Russia between around 5–14 June 2024.
Peremoha	144	Ocheretyne	Russia	21 Feb 2024	Recaptured by Russia on 21 February 2024.
Pishchane	314	Pokrovsk	Russia	25 Jul 2025	Contested by Russia between around 20 December 2024 – 12 January 2025. Captured by Russia around 13 January 2025. Contested by Ukraine since around 8 February 2025. Recaptured by Russia as of 24 July 2025.
Pisky	6	Ocheretyne	Russia	31 Aug 2022	See Battle of Pisky; Population was 2,160 in 2001, but most residents left during the War in Donbas.
Pivnichne	40	Ocheretyne	Russia	27 Feb 2024	Recaptured by Russia between 22–26 February 2024.
Pokrovsk	61,161	Pokrovsk	Ukraine	25 Aug 2025	See Pokrovsk offensive Subject to repeated rocket attacks since late May 2022.
Preobrazhenka	56	Pokrovsk	Russia	29 Mar 2025	Contested by Russia before 29 March 2025. Captured by Russia 29 March 2025.
Prohres	390	Hrodivka	Russia	19 Jul 2024	Pressured by Russia between around 26 June – 17 July 2024. Contested by Russia on 18 July 2024. Captured by Russia on 19 July 2024.
Ptyche	274	Novohrodivka	Russia	22 Aug 2024	Captured by Russia on 22 August 2024.
Selydove	21,916	Selydove	Russia	30 Oct 2024	See Pokrovsk offensive § Battle for Selydove; Contested by Russia between around 28 August – 5 September 2024. Likely recaptured by Ukraine around 6 September 2024. Contested by Russia between around 27 September – late October 2024. Claimed captured by Russian sources on 27 October 2024. Claimed captured by Russia on 29 October 2024. Confirmed captured by Russia on 30 October 2024.
Semenivka	182	Ocheretyne	Russia	28 Apr 2024	Contested by Russia between around 28 March – 26 April 2024. Recaptured by Russia between around 20–26 April 2024.
Serhiivka	159	Hrodivka	Russia	15 Aug 2024	Pressured by Russia between around 27 July – 2 August 2024. Contested by Russia between around 3–6 August 2024. Claimed captured by Russian sources on 3 August 2024. Captured by Russia around 7 August 2024.
Shevchenko	1,654	Pokrovsk	Russia	15 Dec 2024	Contested by Russia between around 6–14 December 2024. Claimed captured by Russian sources on 9 and 10 December 2024. Confirmed captured by Russia on 15 December 2024.
Shevchenko Pershe	10	Hrodivka	Russia	4 Jul 2025	Contested by Russia before 4 July 2025. Captured by Russia 4 July 2025.
Skhidne	52	Ocheretyne	Russia	11 Jul 2024	Contested by Russia between around 1–4 July 2024. Captured by Russia between around 4–11 July 2024.
Sokil	66	Ocheretyne	Russia	6 Jul 2024	Pressured by Russia between around 27 May – 6 June 2024. Contested by Russia between around 7 June – 3 July 2024. Captured by Russia around 6 July 2024.
Soloviove	223	Ocheretyne	Russia	27 Apr 2024	Recaptured by Russia on 25 April 2024.
Soniachne	14	Ocheretyne	Russia	22 Aug 2024	Captured by Russia around 19 August 2024.
Sontsivka	795	Kurakhove	Russia	17 Dec 2024	Contested by Russia between around 9 November – 16 December 2024. Captured by Russia on 17 December 2024.
Stepove	62	Ocheretyne	Russia	27 Feb 2024	Contested by Russia between around 10 November 2023 and 23 February 2024. Recaptured by Russia around 23 February 2024.
Tonenke	320	Ocheretyne	Russia	21 Mar 2024	Contested by Russia between around 26 February – March 2024. Mostly captured by Russia well before 16 March 2024. Fully captured by Russia on 21 March 2024.
Troitske	264	Pokrovsk	Russia	30 May 2025	Contested by Russia since 7 May 2025. Captured by Russia 30 May 2025.
Tsukuryne	1,745	Selydove	Russia	6 Oct 2024	Contested by Russia between around 30 September – 5 October 2024. Captured by Russia around 6 October 2024.
Udachne	1,633	Udachne	Russia	15 Aug 2025	Contested by Russia since around 18 January 2025. Captured by Russia on 15 August 2025.
Ukrainsk	10,655	Selydove	Russia	17 Sep 2024	Pressured by Russia between around 29 August – 5 September 2024. Claimed contested by Russian sources starting 29 August 2024. Contested by Russia between around 6–16 September. Confirmed with geolocated footage to be contested by 11 September. Captured by Russia on 17 September 2024.
Umanske	176	Ocheretyne	Russia	23 May 2024	Contested by Russia between around 9–20 May 2024. Recaptured by Russia around 20 May 2024.
Uspenivka	402	Pokrovsk	Russia	28 Jan 2025	Contested by Russia between 13–14 January 2025. Recaptured by Ukraine on 15 January 2025. Contested by Russia between around 17–27 January 2025. Captured by Russia around 28 January 2025.
Uspenivka	507	Kurakhove	Russia	13 Dec 2024	Contested by Russia between 5–12 December 2024. Captured by Russia on 13 December 2024.
Vesele	129	Hrodivka	Russia	4 Aug 2024	Pressured by Russia between around 25–31 July 2024. Contested by Russia between around 27 July – 3 August 2024. Captured by Russia between around 1–4 August 2024.
Vodiane	319	Ocheretyne	Russia	5 Apr 2024	Fully recaptured by Russia between 31 March – 5 April 2024.
Vovche	95	Hrodivka	Russia	29 Jul 2024	Captured by Russia since around 29 July 2024.
Vozdvyzhenka	381	Hrodivka	Russia	2 Jan 2025	Pressured by Russia between around 23 June – 28 December 2024. Contested by Russia between 29–31 December 2024. Captured by Russia on 1 January 2025.
Yasnobrodivka	70	Ocheretyne	Russia	26 Jul 2024	Contested by Russia between around 17 June – 6 July 2024. Claimed by Russian sources on 23 June 2024. Captured by Russia between around 7–26 July 2024.
Yasnohorivka	526	Ocheretyne	Russia	17 Mar 2023	
Yelyzavetivka	113	Hrodivka	Russia	5 Jan 2025	Contested by Russia since 5 January 2025. Captured by Russia as of 14 May 2025.
Yevhenivka	106	Hrodivka	Russia	29 Jul 2024	Pressured by Russia between 18–22 June 2024. Contested by Russia between 22 June – 9 July 2024. Captured by Russia by around 10 July 2024.
Zavitne	308	Novohrodivka	Russia	18 Aug 2024	Captured by Russia around 18 August 2024.
Zhovte	103	Pokrovsk	Russia	29 Nov 2024	Contested by Russia between around 26–28 November 2024. Captured by Russia on 29 November 2024.
Zoriane	939	Marinka	Russia	30 Oct 2024	Claimed contested by Russia since 8 October 2024. Confirmed contested by Russia between around 19–29 October 2024. Claimed captured by Russia on 19 October 2024. Captured by Russia around 30 October 2024.
Zvirove	1,037	Pokrovsk	Russia	28 Jul 2025	Contested by Russia since 12 January 2025. Captured by Russia around 28 July 2025.

== Volnovakha Raion ==
Name	Pop.	Hromada	Held by	As of	More information
Andriivka	1,652	Velyka Novosilka	Russia	26 Feb 2025	Contested by Russia between around 25 January – 24 February 2025. Claimed captured by Russian sources beginning 11 February 2025. Confirmed captured by Russia on 25 February 2025.
Bahatyr	55	Velyka Novosilka	Russia	12 Jun 2025	Contested by Russia since 9 May 2025. Captured by Russia 17 May 2025. Contested by Ukraine since around 29 May 2025. Claimed recaptured by Russian sources as of 10 June 2025. Confirmed captured by Russia on 12 June 2025.
Blahodatne	564	Velyka Novosilka	Russia	5 Dec 2024	Captured by Russia/DPR in 2022. Recaptured by Ukraine on 10 June 2023. Recaptured by Russia on 5 December 2024.
Bohoiavlenka	1,490	Vuhledar	Russia	27 Oct 2024	Contested by Russia on 26 October 2024. Likely captured by Russia on 27 October 2024.
Dniproenerhiia	96	Komar	Russia	13 Mar 2025	Contested by Russia before 12 March 2025. Captured by Russia 12 March 2025.
Fedorivka	257	Komar	Russia	16 Jun 2025	Contested by Russia before 6 June 2025. Captured by Russia 6 June 2025. Contested by Ukraine before 10 June 2025. Captured by Ukraine on 10 June 2025. Contested by Russia before 16 June 2025. Recaptured by Russia on 16 June 2025.
Komar	121	Komar	Contested	22 Jun 2025	Contested by Russia since 7 June 2025. Captured by Russia 22 June 2025. Contested by Ukraine in September 2026.
Kostiantynopil	1,076	Velyka Novosilka	Russia	29 Apr 2025	Contested by Russia between 27 February 2025. Captured by Russia 9 March 2025. Contested by Ukraine since around 17 March 2025. Recaptured by Russia 29 April 2025.
Makarivka	258	Velyka Novosilka	Russia	24 Dec 2024	Captured by Russia/DPR in 2022. Recaptured by Ukraine between 13–14 June 2023. Recaptured by Russia around 23 December 2024.
Maksymivka	793	Vuhledar	Russia	2 Nov 2024	Captured by Russia on 2 November 2024.
Myrne	100	Komar	Ukraine	12 Aug 2026	Contested by Russia since 13 July 2025. Captured by Russia on 13 July 2025.
Neskuchne	644	Velyka Novosilka	Russia	13 Jan 2025	Captured by Russia/DPR in Spring 2022. Recaptured by Ukraine on 10 June 2023. Claimed captured by Russian sources on 10 and 11 January 2025. Confirmed captured by Russia on 13 January 2025.
Novokhatske	143	Komar	Russia	16 Jul 2025	Contested by Russia since 12 July 2025. Captured by Russia on 16 July 2025.
Novomaiorske	551	Staromlynivka	Russia	10 Apr 2022	
Novoocheretuvate	199	Komar	Russia	21 Feb 2025	Contested by Russia between 15–19 February 2025. Captured by Russia on 20 February 2025.
Novopil	253	Velyka Novosilka	Russia	31 May 2025	Contested by Russia before 31 May 2025. Captured by Russia 31 May 2025.
Novosilka	104	Velyka Novosilka	Russia	17 Feb 2025	Contested by Russia since 16 February 2025. Captured by Russia as of 17 May 2025.
Novotroitske	6,445	Olhynka	Russia	6 May 2022	Captured by Donetsk PR 11 March 2022.
Novoukrainka	1,523	Vuhledar	Russia	29 Oct 2024	Contested by Russia between 26–28 October 2024. Captured by Russia on 29 October 2024.
Novyi Komar	534	Velyka Novosilka	Russia	19 Dec 2024	Contested by Russia between 1–4 December 2024. Recaptured by Ukraine on 5 December 2024. Contested by Russia between 15–18 December 2024. Captured by Russia on 19 December 2024.
Odradne	259	Velyka Novosilka	Russia	23 May 2025	Contested by Russia before 23 May 2025. Captured by Russia 23 May 2025.
Oleksiivka	1,163	Velyka Novosilka	Russia	28 Jul 2025	Contested by Russia since 31 May 2025. Captured by Russia 11 June 2025. Contested by Ukraine since between 14-16 June 2025. Recaptured by Russia on 28 July 2025.
Pavlivka	2,505	Vuhledar	Russia	14 Nov 2022	Captured by Russia/DPR 13 March 2022. Recaptured by Ukraine 21 June 2022. Recaptured by Russia between 11–14 November 2022.
Perebudova	121	Komar	Russia	22 Jun 2025	Contested by Russia before 22 June 2025. Captured by Russia 22 June 2025.
Piddubne	532	Komar	Russia	6 Jul 2025	Contested by Russia before 6 July 2025. Captured by Russia 6 July 2025.
Prechystivka	898	Vuhledar	Russia	5 Sep 2024	Captured by Russia around 3 September 2024.
Rivnopil	98	Velyka Novosilka	Russia	14 Nov 2024	Captured by Russia/DPR before the 2023 Ukrainian counteroffensive. Recaptured by Ukraine on 26 June 2023. Contested by Russia between around 11–13 November 2024. Recaptured by Russia around 14 November 2024.
Rozdolne	1,120	Velyka Novosilka	Russia	29 Nov 2024	Contested by Russia between 23–28 November 2024. Captured by Russia on 29 November 2024.
Rozlyv	751	Velyka Novosilka	Russia	1 Apr 2025	Contested by Russia before 31 March 2025. Captured by Russia 1 April 2025.
Shakhtarske	1,154	Velyka Novosilka	Russia	2 Nov 2024	Contested by Russia between around 26 October – 1 November 2024. Claimed captured by Russian sources on 29 October 2024. Captured by Russia around 2 November 2024.
Shevchenko	103	Komar	Russia	21 Jun 2025	Contested by Russia before 21 June 2025. Captured by Russia 21 June 2025.
Solodke	525	Vuhledar	Russia	5 Jul 2022	Recaptured by Ukraine 5 July 2022. Recaptured by Russia/DPR 19 August 2022.
Staromaiorske	839	Velyka Novosilka	Russia	10 Jun 2024	Captured by Russia/DPR in 2022. Recaptured by Ukraine between 27–28 July 2023. Contested by Russia between 8 May – 9 June 2024. Recaptured by Russia on 10 June 2024.
Staromlynivka	2,635	Staromlynivka	Russia	13 Mar 2022	Captured by Russia/DPR 13 March 2022.
Storozheve	96	Velyka Novosilka	Russia	24 Dec 2024	Captured by Russia/DPR in 2022. Recaptured by Ukraine on 11 June 2023. Contested by Russia on 23 December 2024. Claimed captured by Russia on 23 December 2024. Confirmed captured by Russia on 24 December 2024.
Tovste	101	Komar	Russia	9 Jul 2025	Contested by Russia since 7 July 2025. Captured by Russia 9 July 2025.
Ulakly	867	Velyka Novosilka	Russia	21 Feb 2025	Contested by Russia between 15–20 February 2025. Captured by Russia on 21 February 2025.
Urozhaine	1,000	Velyka Novosilka	Russia	13 Jul 2024	Captured by Russia/DPR in 2022. Recaptured by Ukraine between 15–16 August 2023. Pressured by Russia between around 1–7 May 2024. Contested by Russia between around 8 May – 12 July 2024. Recaptured by Russia around 13 July 2024.
Velyka Novosilka	5,235	Velyka Novosilka	Russia	25 Jan 2025	See Velyka Novosilka offensive Contested by Russia between 18–24 January 2025. Claimed captured by Russia on 25 January 2025. Confirmed captured by Russia on 28 January 2025.
Vesele	282	Komar	Russia	4 Jul 2025	Contested by Russia on 3 April 2025. Captured by Russia 6 June 2025. Contested by Ukraine before 10 June 2025. Captured by Ukraine on 10 June 2025. Contested by Russia before 4 July 2025. Recaptured by Russia on 4 July 2025.
Vilne Pole	385	Komar	Russia	15 May 2025	Contested by Russia before 29 April 2025. Captured by Russia 15 May 2025.
Vodiane	324	Vuhledar	Russia	8 Sep 2024	Captured by Russia on 8 September 2024.
Volnovakha	21,441	Volnovakha	Russia	11 Mar 2022	See Volnovakha bus attack (2015), Battle of Volnovakha; Captured by Donetsk PR 11 March 2022.
Volodymyrivka	6,325	Olhynka	Russia	20 Aug 2022	
Voskresenka	426	Komar	Russia	7 Aug 2025	Contested by Russia on 19 July 2025. Captured by Russia 7 August 2024.
Vremivka	1,431	Velyka Novosilka	Russia	17 Jan 2025	Contested by Russia between 15–16 January 2025. Captured by Russia on 17 January 2025.
Vuhledar	14,144	Vuhledar	Russia	1 Oct 2024	See Battle of Vuhledar; Captured by Russia on 1 October 2024.
Yalta	143	Komar	Russia	25 Aug 2025	Contested by Russia before 26 June 2025. Captured by Russia 26 June 2025. Contested by Ukraine since 18 July 2025. Recaptured by Russia 25 August 2025.
Yasna Poliana	434	Velyka Novosilka	Russia	1 Nov 2024	Contested by Russia between around 29–31 October 2024. Claimed captured by Russian sources on 29 October 2024. Confirmed captured by Russia around 2 November 2024.
Zaporizhzhia	884	Komar	Russia	21 Jun 2025	Contested by Russia before 21 June 2025. Captured by Russia 21 June 2025.
Zelena Dolyna	89	Lyman	Russia	11 Jul 2025	Contested by Russia before 11 July 2025. Captured by Russia 23 May 2025.
Zelene Pole	578	Velyka Novosilka	Russia	31 May 2025	Captured by Russia since 1 June 2025.
Zelenyi Hai	915	Komar	Russia	26 Jul 2025	Contested by Russia on 19 July 2025. Captured by Russia 26 July 2025.
Zirka	134	Komar	Russia	28 Jun 2025	Contested by Russia before 28 June 2025. Captured by Russia 28 June 2025.

== See also ==
- Territorial control during the Russo-Ukrainian War
- Donetsk People's Republic
- War in Donbas
- Eastern Ukraine campaign
- Battle of Donbas (2022)
