= Andriivka, Velyka Novosilka settlement hromada, Volnovakha Raion, Donetsk Oblast =

Andriivka Андріївка
- Village
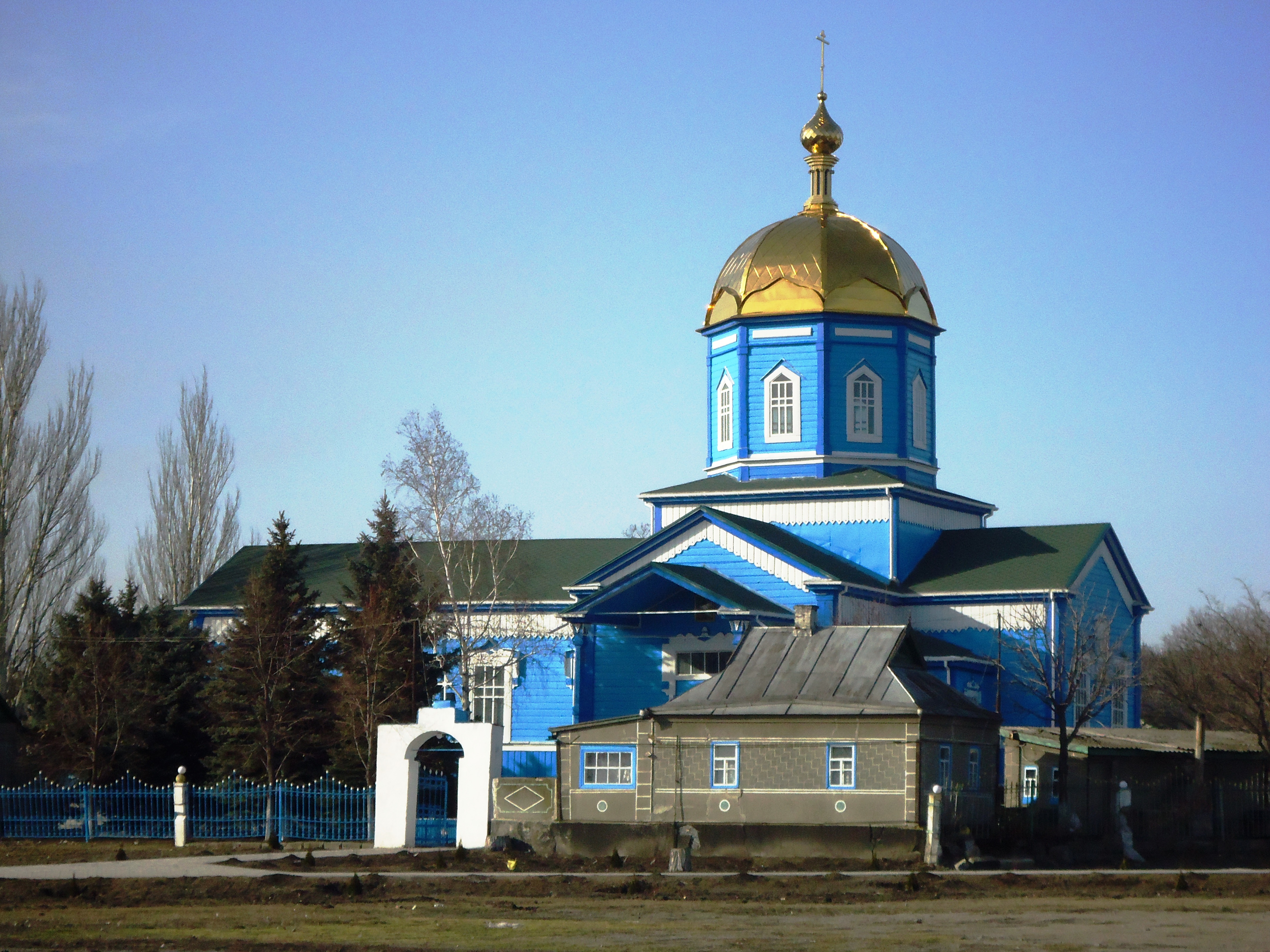
- A church

- Andriivka shown within Ukraine Andriivka shown within Donetsk
- Coordinates: 48°1′21″N 37°3′25″E
- Country: Ukraine
- Oblast: Donetsk Oblast
- Raion: Volnovakha Raion
- Hromada: Velyka Novosilka settlement hromada
- Elevation: 123 m (404 ft)

Population (2001)
  - Total: 1,652
- Postal code: 85540
- Area code: +380 6243

Andriivka (Ukrainian: Андріївка; Russian: Андреевка) is a village in Velyka Novosilka hromada, Volnovakha Raion, Donetsk Oblast, Ukraine. In 2001 it had a population of 1652. At an altitude of 123 m, the village is on the river Vovcha.

== History ==
The village was founded in 1660 as a winter camp for the Cossack leader Andriy Solohub. Soviet power was established here in February 1918. In May 1919, the chairman of the Andriivka Volost Executive Committee, K. M. Burda, was killed by the Makhnovists. The chief livestock specialist of the Andriivka collective farm, H. F. Holovach, was elected a deputy of the Supreme Soviet of the USSR of the 6th convocation.

Bronze Age burial mounds are known near Andriivka.

=== During the Great Patriotic War ===
During the Great Patriotic War, 835 people from Andriivka fought against the Nazis, and 428 of them fell in battle. For the courage and valor they displayed in combat, 238 local residents were awarded orders and medals of the USSR. P. K. Marushko was a full bearer of the Order of Glory. On the eve of the village's liberation from the occupiers, Hitler's executioners shot 14 civilians, including children. A memorial plaque has been installed in honor of the fellow villagers who died in the fight against the Nazis. Two monuments have been erected to the soldiers who fell liberating the village.

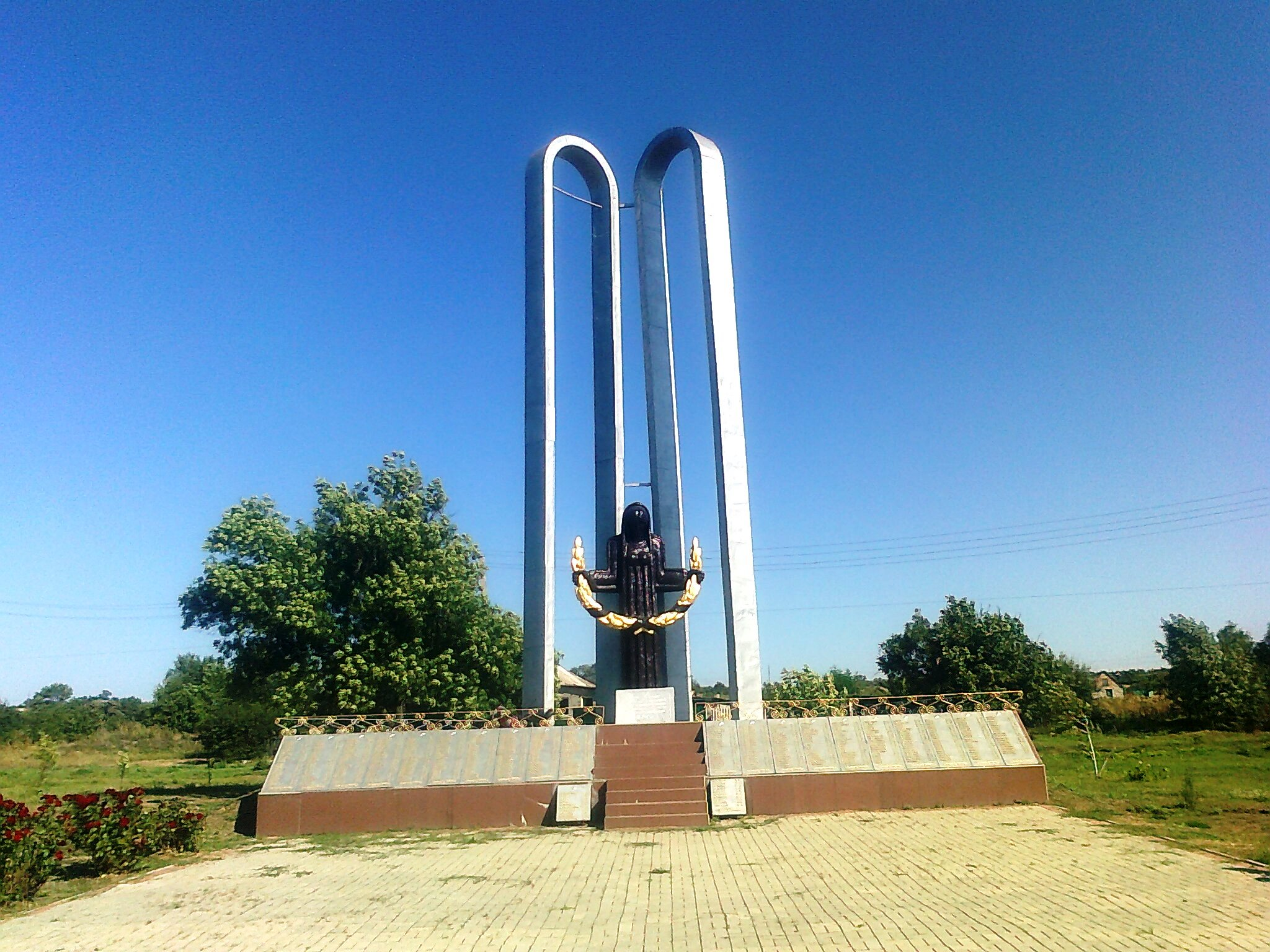
Mass grave

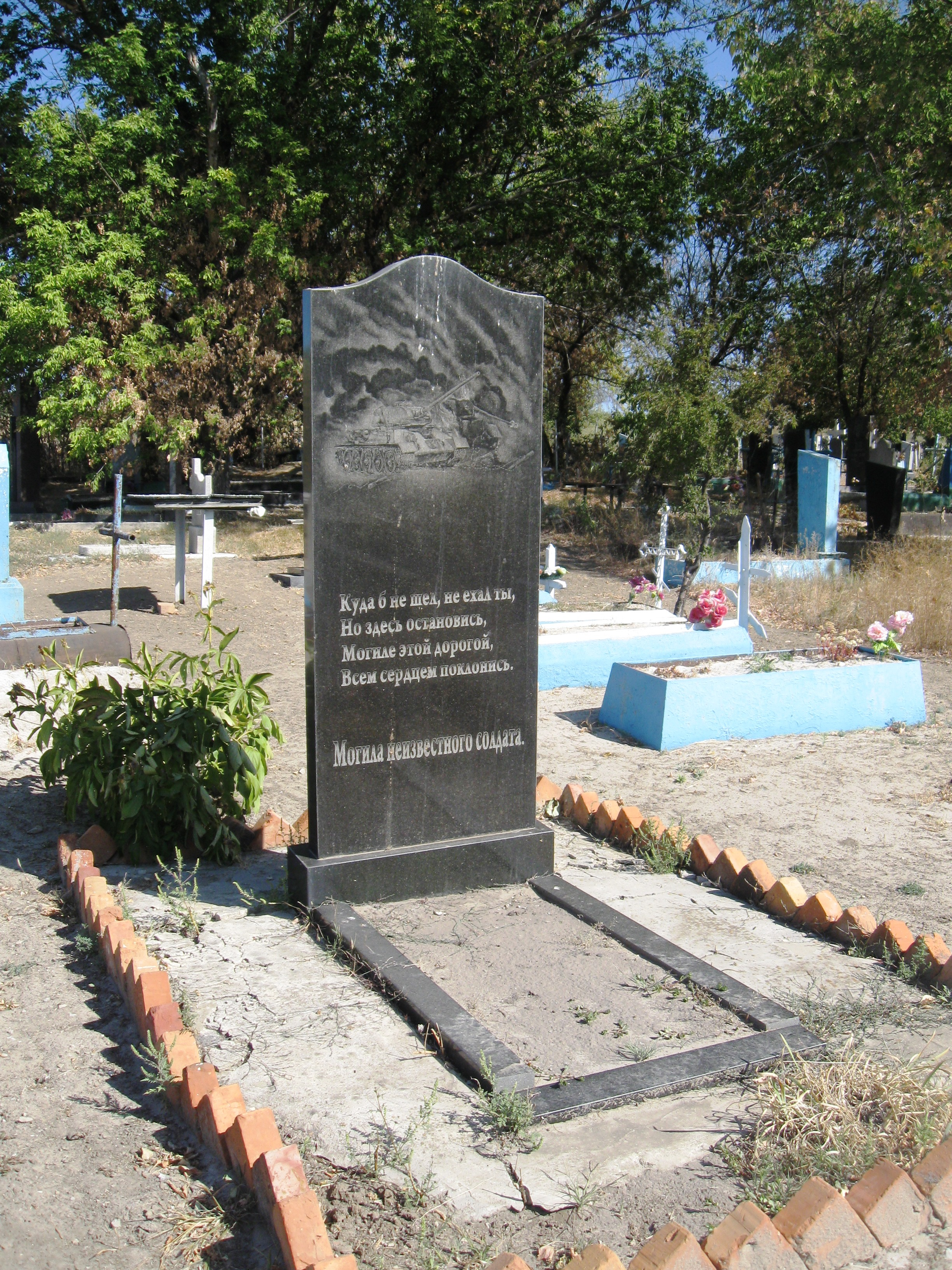
Tomb of the Unknown Soldier

=== Russian invasion in Ukraine ===
Due to the approaching Russian troops, the evacuation of families with children was ordered on 14 November 2024.

Russian forces advanced to the outskirts of the village on 25 January 2025. Later in February, the Russian army entered the village and captured part of it. The village was fully captured by Russian forces by late February.

== Economy ==
The central estate of the V. I. Lenin Collective Farm is located in Andriivka. The farm manages 6,536 hectares of agricultural land, including 5,051 hectares of arable land, 640 hectares of which is irrigated. It is a diversified agricultural enterprise focused on grain production and meat and dairy farming. The village also operates an oil press (for extracting oil from seeds) and a grain mill. For their labor achievements, 29 villagers were awarded state orders and medals, including the Order of Lenin.

== Social infrastructure ==
The village has one secondary school and two primary schools, where 37 teachers provide education to 670 children. Andriivka also has a community center with a 400-seat hall, three libraries with a collection of 21,848 books, a local hospital with 50 beds staffed by five doctors and 25 paramedical personnel, a pharmacy, and a nursery-kindergarten for 85 children. The village offers a post office, a savings bank, a household service center, a department store, a grocery store, and three other shops. Eighty-six residential buildings have been constructed, and 260 homes have been connected to a gas supply. A 6-kilometer water supply system has been built. The village streets are paved with asphalt, and all apartments have access to radio and electricity.

The Party organization, established in 1924, had 66 Communists, and the Komsomol organization, founded the same year, had 178 members of the Komsomol (VLKSM)

== Transportation ==
Andriivka is located on the T-05-15, which connects to the H-15 in the south (Kostiantynopil) and leads to Oleksandrivka (over Pokrovsk) in the north-east.
