= Makarivka, Volnovakha Raion, Donetsk Oblast =

Village in Donetsk Oblast, Ukraine

Makarivka Макарівка
- Village
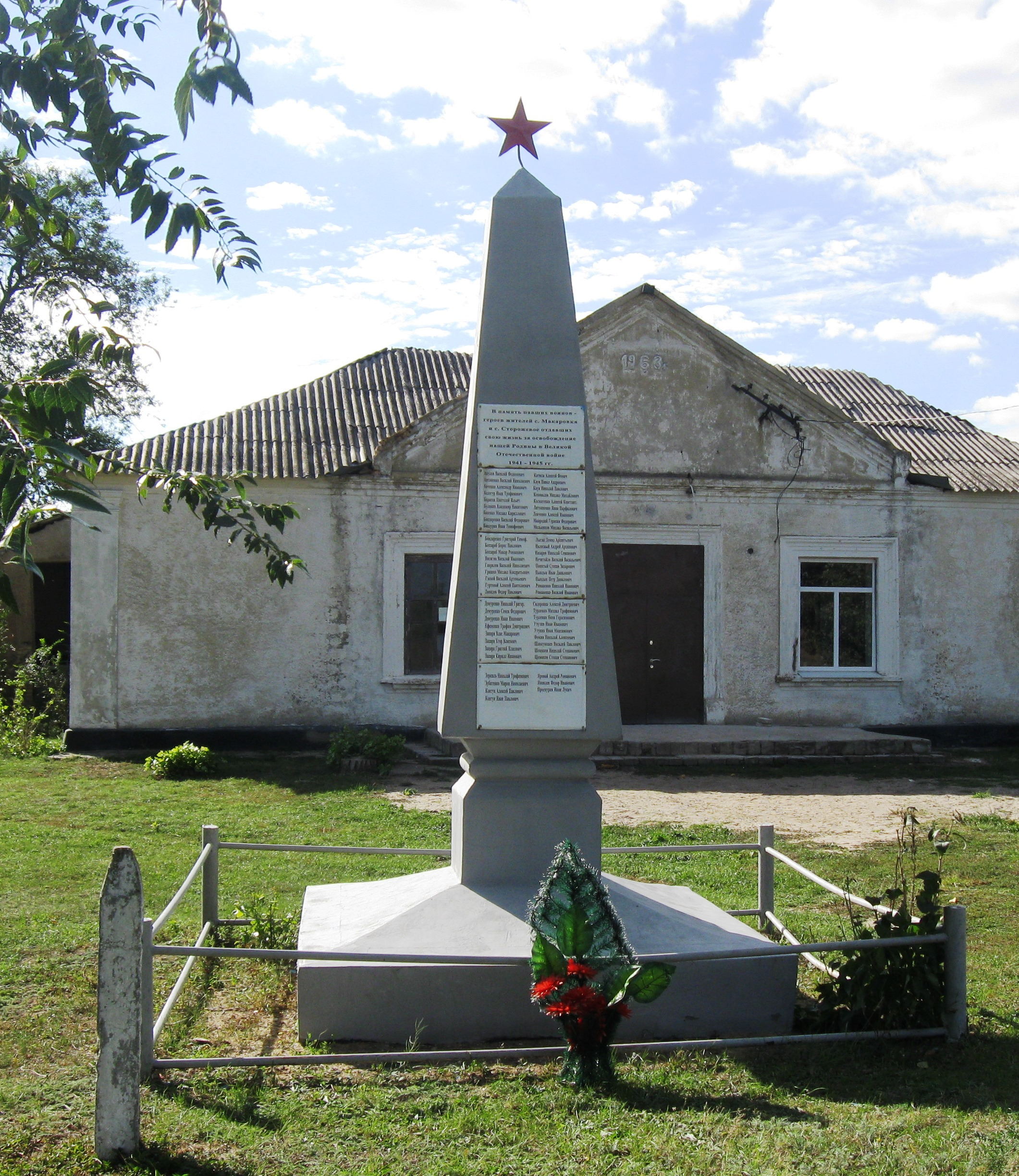
- A monument to soldiers of the Red Army of the Soviet Union in the village
- Interactive map of Makarivka
- Coordinates: 47°46′41″N 36°48′05″E
- Country: Ukraine
- Oblast: Donetsk Oblast
- Raion: Volnovakha Raion
- Hromada: Velyka Novosilka settlement hromada

Area
  - Total: 0.8231 km^{2} (0.3178 sq mi)
- Elevation: 110 m (360 ft)

Population (2001 census)
  - Total: 258
  - Density: 313/km^{2} (812/sq mi)
- Time zone: UTC+2 (EET)
  - Summer (DST): UTC+3 (EEST)
- Postal code: 85550
- Area code: +380 6243
- KOATUU code: 1421284802
- KATOTTH code: UA14040010080042209

Makarivka (Ukrainian: Макарівка; Russian: Макаровка, romanized: Makarovka) is a village in Volnovakha Raion, Donetsk Oblast, Ukraine. During the Russian invasion in 2022, the village was captured early in the war by Russian forces. Ukrainian forces retook it in June 2023 during their 2023 counteroffensive, but the settlement again fell to Russian forces in December 2024.

== Geography ==
The village is on the left bank of the Mokri Yaly river, with the settlements of Blahodatne and Storozheve to the north, and Staromaiorske and Urozhaine to the south.

== Demographics ==
According to the 2001 census, the village had a population of 258 people, of whom 82.56% said that their native language was Ukrainian and 17.44% Russian.

== History ==
On 17 June 2020, Decree No. 33, Article 235 of the Verkhovna Rada placed the village in the administration of the Velyka Novosilka settlement hromada, also incorporating it into the significantly expanded Volnovakha Raion.

=== Russian invasion of Ukraine ===
At the beginning of the Russian invasion of Ukraine, Makarivka was occupied by Russian troops in their initial advance into Ukraine. The village remained under Russian control for over a year, until 11 June 2023, when Ukrainian forces retook it in the initial days of their summer counteroffensive of that year. The recapture was first officially announced by Ukrainian Deputy Defense Minister Hanna Maliar on the messaging app Telegram on 11 June. While some Russian milbloggers claimed that fighting was still ongoing for the village, many supported the notion of the village's retaking on this date.

Throughout the following day, 12 June, Russian forces attempted to recapture the village using a combination of aviation and artillery barrages. A Russian tracked articulated vehicle equipped with thermobaric artillery, nicknamed "Sunstroke", was moved to the vicinity of the village, presumably to provide artillery support. During the fighting for the village, the remaining infrastructure there would be "reduced to ruins through the course of the day", according to Ukrainian southern military spokesman Valeriy Shershen via Facebook.

The attacks were repelled by Ukrainian forces, and on 13 June, video evidence by the 137th battalion of the 35th Marine Brigade was released, showing them in the village holding the Ukrainian flag. This news was followed by the announcement that stabilization operations by the 35th Separate Brigade had begun in the village, as the General Staff of Ukraine reported that fighting continued east of the village on the opposite bank of the Mokri Yaly river.

In the course of a renewed offensive towards the fortified settlement Velyka Novosilka, a salient formed in the surrounding of the villages of Storozheve and Makarivka, amid Russian advances. On 13 December 2024, the Russian forces advanced to the south of Storozheve, north of Makarivka, starting to separate the two settlements. In the following days, Makarivka was isolated even more, as the Russian contingent advanced west and north, threatening to create a pocket and encircle Makarivka. DeepStateMap.Live showed on 21 December that Makarivka and the surrounding defensive lines were encircled in a roughly 2.32 km^{2} area. Ukraine's Defense Forces denied the encirclement, and the incident sparked critics of DeepStateMap such as MP Maryana Bezuhla, who suggested shutting down the project. Military expert Mykhailo Zhyrokhov said "Often, families learn of a loved one's death from unofficial sources, or unofficial outlets report the loss of a settlement, while official sources contradict it." Footage published on 23 December showed that Makarivka had been recaptured by Russian forces.

== See also ==
- List of villages in Donetsk Oblast
