= Velyka Novosilka =

Russian-occupied settlement in Donetsk Oblast, Ukraine

Velyka Novosilka Велика Новосілка
- Rural settlement
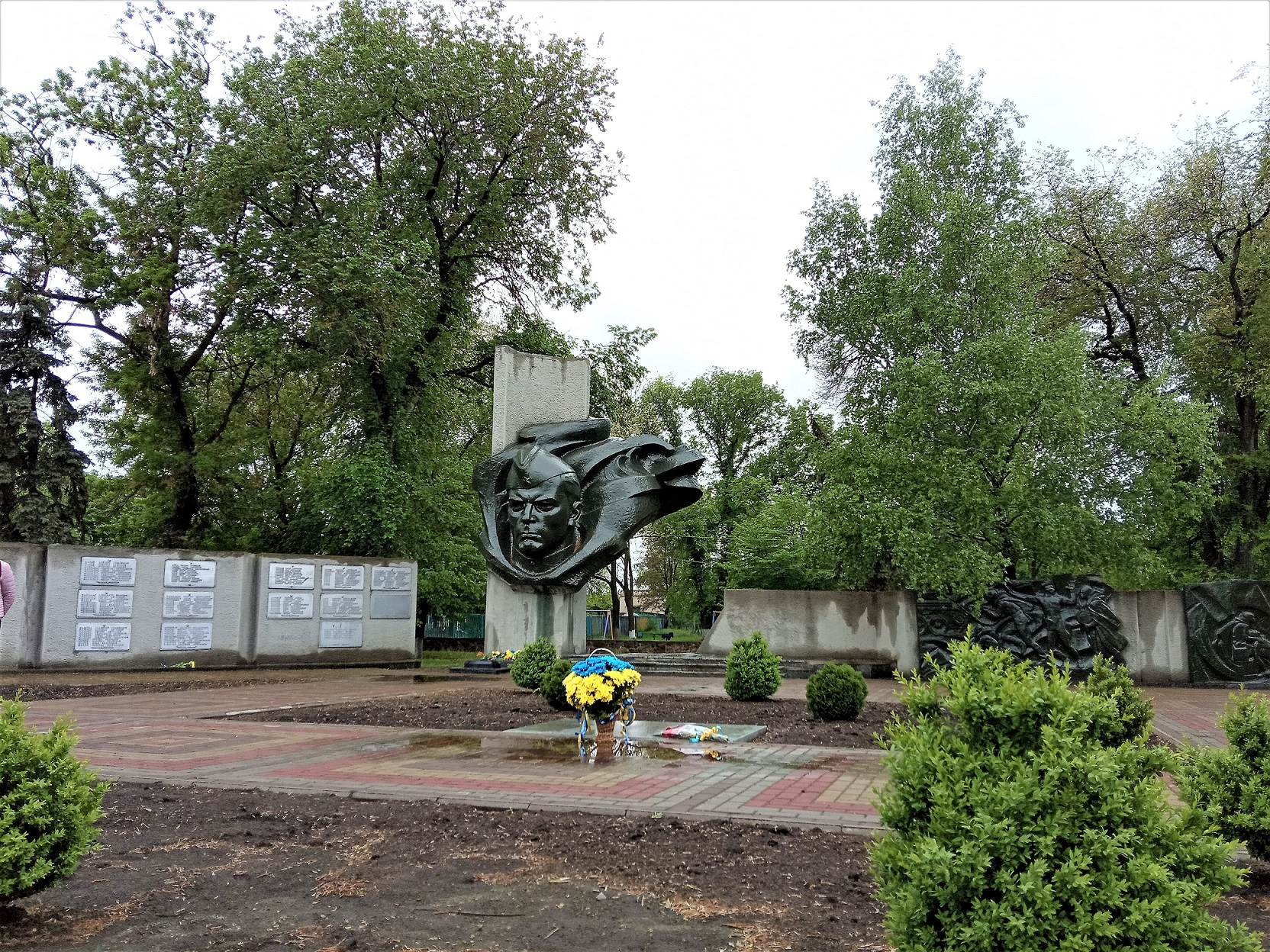
- World War II Memorial in Velyka Novosilka, 2020

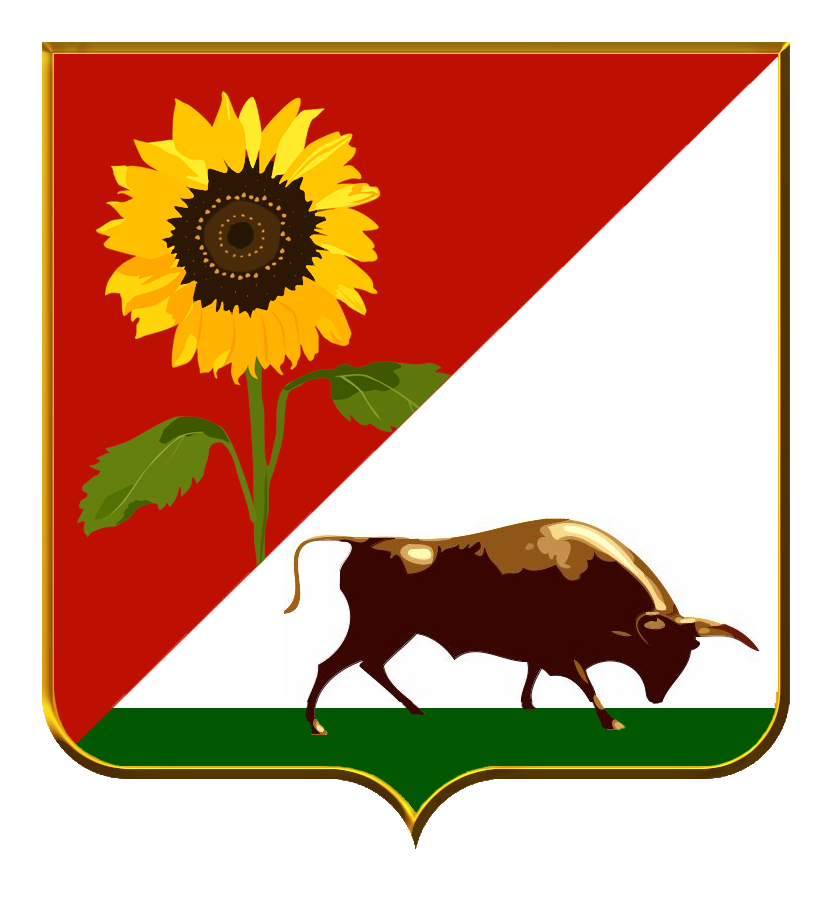
- Seal
- Interactive map of Velyka Novosilka
- Location within Donetsk Oblast Location within Ukraine
- Coordinates: 47°50′18″N 36°50′06″E
- Country: Ukraine
- Oblast: Donetsk Oblast
- Raion: Volnovakha Raion
- Hromada: Velyka Novosilka settlement hromada
- Founded: 1779

Area
  - Total: 9.385 km^{2} (3.624 sq mi)

Population (2022)
  - Total: 5,235
- KATOTTH: UA14040010010027148
- Climate: Dfb
- Website: vnovoselke.at.ua

Velyka Novosilka (Ukrainian: Велика Новосілка; Russian: Великая Новосёлка, romanized: Velikaya Novosyolka; Greek: Μεγάλο Νέο Χωριό; Crimean Tatar: Büyük Yañı Köy) is a rural settlement in Volnovakha Raion, Donetsk Oblast, eastern Ukraine. Population: 5,235 (2022 estimate). The settlement has been under Russian occupation since 28 January 2025.

== Geography ==
The village is located on the eastern, right bank of the Mokri Yaly River, a tributary of the Vovcha in the Dnieper basin, located 90 km from Donetsk and 45 km from the Roy railway station. It is connected by bus services to the cities of Donetsk, Dnipro, Mariupol, and Zaporizhzhia. Two territorial roads pass through the village – T0509 and T0518.

== History ==
=== Foundation and early development ===
The settlement was known as Bolshoy Yanisal (Russian: Большой Янисаль; Urum: Салгир Йаны Сала, Salgir Yanı Sala) before 1946 (since 1930 – Bolshoy Yanisol (Russian: Большой Янисоль), in Ukrainian - Velyka Yanysol (Велика Янисоль).

Velyka Novosyilka was established in 1779 by Mariupol Greeks and Urums who had been evicted from Crimea and moved to the designated colonies of the Russian Empire. Their former settlement was located at the confluence of two Crimean villages, Bolshoy Yanisal (commonly known as Yanisal) and Salgir-Yenisal. Its founders also included residents from the villages of Ayan and Ozenbash. For many years, part of the new Bolshoy Yanisal was informally referred to as Ozenbash.

Under Empress Catherine II’s charter, the settlers were allocated 30 dessiatinas (1 dessiatin ≈ 1.09 hectars) of land per person and were exempt from all duties for 10 years, as well as from conscription for 100 years.

Initially, Bolshoy Yanisal was part of the Mariupol district in the Yekaterinoslav Province of the Novorossiya Governorate. Early settlers established their community along the right bank of the Mokri Yaly River, creating a village that stretched from Shaytankato in the south to the Arym estuary in the north, at the confluence of the Kashlagach and Shaitanka tributaries. The village was organized into three quarters, or streets.

While the inhabitants of Yanisol primarily spoke Greek, those from other villages, such as Ozenbash, spoke Tatar. Most Greek-speaking settlers came from Salgir-Yenisal (Selgir bni Sala), while the Tatar-speaking population primarily originated from Bolshoy Yanisol (Velykyi bni Sala). This linguistic divide persists in the village today. Over time, the Greek-speaking residents in the southern part of the village became known as Greco-Hellenes, while those in the northern area were referred to as Greco-Tatars. The two groups were separated by a boundary known as Bankovsky Lane (later Y. Gagarin Avenue).

The settlement became one of the centers of development of Greek culture in Ukraine. Residents primarily engaged in livestock farming, trade, sericulture, and agriculture. Land was communally managed, and plots were redistributed every 10–12 years.

As part of an administrative reform in the Russian Empire, the settlement became part of the Yekaterinoslav Governorate and the Mariupol uezd in the turn of the century.

=== Developments in the 19th century ===
In the 19th century, the settlement witnessed significant development in agriculture and early industrial activities.

By 1817, the village had grown to include over 200 households and a population nearing 1,200 residents. The yearly grain harvest, amounted to over 10,000 quarters, while the livestock holdings included tens of thousands of sheep, thousands of cattle, and hundreds of horses.

Over time, the economy diversified. Local resources like chalk, clay, and stone were harnessed for brick-making and pottery production. Skilled artisans produced farming tools, leather goods, and woven textiles, including linen, carpets, and woolen items. These crafts played a crucial role in supplementing the agricultural economy.

Following the 1861 reforms, wealthy kulaks emerged, using hired labor to expand their farms, while poorer peasants often worked as laborers or migrated to industrial centers for employment.

In 1866, Velykyi Yanisol was designated the administrative center of a volost, managing vast tracts of land measuring tens of thousands of acres. The village’s agricultural output remained robust, with several thousand acres dedicated to crops like winter and spring grains, yielding tens of thousands of quarters annually. However, livestock numbers had fallen sharply compared to earlier decades, with the cattle population halved and other livestock holdings significantly reduced. Economic inequalities became more pronounced, as some households owned extensive farmland, while others had little to none. Many small farmers struggled to make ends meet, turning to crafts or becoming hired laborers to survive. A decree allowed the state peasant inhabitants of Bolshoy Yanisol to purchase land.

In the later 19th century, various crafts in the village flourished and specialised. Residents produced bricks and tiles, including a type called "tatarka," and crafted clay items such as bowls, jugs, and other utensils. They also manufactured agricultural tools like plowshares, scythes, and rakes. Leather processing was conducted locally, producing materials for casings and shoes, such as postols. On homemade looms, villagers wove linen, carpets, and runners, while wool products were knitted with notable skill.

Beginning in 1878, the village hosted semi-annual fairs in the autumn and spring. The education sector grew, and by 1886, out of 378 school-age children, 182 were enrolled in school.

By the late 19th century, the village recorded over 100 laborers, including migrants seeking work opportunities. These times also saw the rise of small-scale industry in the village. Industrial and commercial establishments emerged in the village, including two brick and tile factories, four forges, 17 windmills, and one watermill. There were also five shops and taverns. Meanwhile, some villagers left to find work in larger industrial projects, including the Yuzivka Metallurgical Plant and the Mariupol Railway. These changes marked a gradual shift from a predominantly agrarian society to one influenced by industrialization.

=== 20th century and World Wars ===
In the 20th century, the settlement experienced major political upheaval and two devastating World Wars, along with Soviet rule.

During the First Russian Revolution, local peasants and workers protested against tsarist policies. In 1905, the publication of the tsarist manifesto promising political freedoms and the creation of a legislative Duma sparked hope but also skepticism. Teachers and activists like G. I. Kedrova and Kh. S. Sidorenko organized a meeting attended by nearly 500 villagers to discuss the manifesto. Some people denounced it as deceitful and urged resistance, but the authorities quickly retaliated, arresting organizers and exiling them. The village's foreman, S. I. Chotiy, was dismissed from his position. This marked the beginning of a long conflict.

By 1913, the village had three primary schools serving over 400 students.

In the years leading up to the 1917 Russian Revolution, Velikiy Yanisol saw deepening economic inequality. Kulaks owned large tracts of land and controlled most agricultural tools, while the majority of peasants struggled with poverty. Many were forced into labor on kulak farms under harsh conditions, receiving meager compensation. By 1917, over a third of the village’s farms were landless, while only a small fraction owned modern agricultural tools like plows and seeders. These disparities fueled dissatisfaction among the poor.

The outbreak of World War I severely impacted the community. Many families lost their source of income, as 936 men from Velyka Novosilka were mobilized into the Imperial Russian Army. The war strained local agriculture and economy, with women and adolescents shouldering much of the labor in the absence of men. Wealthy kulak farms remained relatively stable, employing 60 hired workers to maintain their operations, while smaller farms struggled with insufficient resources.

During the subsequent Russian Civil War, the village experienced further disruption. Local sympathizers with the revolution, among them soldiers and local leaders, agronomists and ex-soldiers, advocated for the redistribution of land and kulak property and began forming councils to implement revolutionary changes.

In 1918, Austro-German troops and the White Guard seized the area and formed the Ukrainian State (Hetmanate), also initiating widespread looting of livestock, grain, and other resources. The village was forced to pay significant contributions to the occupying forces, exacerbating local hardships. This occupation fueled a growing insurgent movement in the region, with up to 900 armed rebels reportedly operating near Velyka Novosilka by late 1918, according to sympathizing sources. By November 1918, forces of the Central Powers were expelled, and revolutionary councils continued the fight against the White Guard, led by Denikin.

By 1920, Soviet forces gained control, establishing the Ukrainian SSR in the USSR. As part of land reforms, kulak properties were confiscated and redistributed among peasants, also establishing communal farms. Revolutionary committees worked to rebuild the economy and support the Red Army, despite ongoing conflicts.

In 1923, the settlement became the center of a new administrative district. By the 1930s, collective farms such as "Red Partisan" and "Gerzamet" were producing significant grain and livestock yields, equipped with modern machinery like tractors and threshers, though not without fierce resistance from wealthy landowners.

The collectivization process, however, brought severe hardships. Resistance to these policies was met with the large-scale mass murder, starvation and deportation of kulaks, which contributed to the broader socioeconomic struggles of the time. To commemorate the victims of the Holodomor and political repression, a memorial sign was erected in the village, which was attended by memorial ceremonies. The NKVD repressions of the 1930s also dealt a great blow to the development of Greek culture in Donetsk Oblast, as a large number of ethnic Greeks was deported to Gulags or executed. All these events, as well as the later post-war ethnic cleansing of Greeks, are described as genocide by numerous scholars.

By the 1939/40 academic year, two secondary schools in the village were educating 800 students. There also was a library with thousands of books, and cultural centers.

During World War II, from October 10, 1941, to September 12, 1943, the village was under occupation by Nazi and Axis forces. During this time, resistance efforts by local partisans and underground groups took shape. An underground Komsomol youth group organized by “Hero of the Soviet Union” O. I. Bilogurov operated within the village, distributing leaflets and rallying resistance. Many members of the resistance were captured and executed by the Nazis in 1942.

Soviet forces retook the village in September 1943. However, the war had left widespread destruction. Agricultural equipment, livestock, and infrastructure were significantly damaged. Post-war reconstruction prioritized rebuilding collective farms, restoring agricultural production, and repairing industrial facilities. By the late 1940s, Velyka Novosilka had regained its pre-war economic levels.

In June 1946, the settlement was renamed to its current name, Velyka Novosilka.

Post-war modernization saw extensive investments in infrastructure and social services. Housing projects replaced damaged buildings, while roads and bridges were repaired or newly constructed. The collective farm "Batkivshchyna" received modern agricultural machinery, significantly increasing productivity, producing substantial grain, milk, and meat supplies. Industrial enterprises, including a dairy plant and machine-building workshops, complemented agricultural activities. Healthcare services were rebuilt and expanded, with new hospitals and clinics established to serve the growing population. Educational institutions were enlarged, with the construction of new schools, cultural centers, extensive libraries and the introduction of evening classes for workers.

In 1959, following the merger of the Velyka Novosyilka and Staromlyniv districts, Velyka Novosyilka became the administrative center of one of the largest districts in the Donetsk Oblast.

In the later 20th century, the cultural sector of the settlement was expanded. Cultural initiatives included music schools, choirs, and amateur theater groups. The district's local history museum, established in 1961, preserved the settlement’s heritage. A folk conservatory, established in 1963, trained local musicians and artists. Healthcare facilities, including hospitals and clinics, provided comprehensive medical care. Housing projects, water supply systems, and electrification modernized the settlement.

By 1965, Velyka Novosilka was granted urban-type settlement status.

=== Independent Ukraine and 21st century ===
On 14 August 1996, by the decision of the 63rd session of the village council, the modern coat of arms was approved: the shield is bevelled on the left red and silver. In the red field is a green sunflower with green leaves and a black head with golden petals; in the silver field is a brown bull/turtle, turned to the left, standing on black earth. The author is O. Kyrychok.

==== Russo-Ukrainian War ====
The settlement was an important Ukrainian defensive node and is noted to be of major geo-economic importance, being located in close proximity to lithium worth hundreds of billions of dollars, stored in the Shevchenko lithium deposit.

With the beginning of the War in Donbas in 2014, pro-Russian forces tried to establish the Donetsk People's Republic (DPR) in the settlement, planned to be conducted by pro-Russian forces with assistance from Russian forces.

On 15 May 2014, a Ukrainian battalion of the Donbas Battalion captured the district police department in Velyka Novosilka from the police, loyal to the pro-Russian forces. After that, the head of the district police department was replaced, and the personnel were brought to re-swear an oath of allegiance to Ukraine. The flag of Ukraine was raised over the building of the district council. Later, at around 21.00, information was received about 30 vehicles of militants from the Vostok Battalion moving towards Velyka Novosilka, but no real battle took place. After a short firefight, Vostok retreated after suffering several lightly wounded.

In August 2014, a statue of Lenin on the central square of Velyka Novosilka was repainted in the colours of the Ukrainian flag and an inscription "Glory to Ukraine! Glory to Heroes! was made on its pedestal.

On 3 September 2014, more than a thousand residents of the village of Velyka Novosilka in Donetsk Oblast held a rally ‘For United Ukraine’ and were fearful of DPR militants on their territory.

Later, in 2016, a memorial sign was erected in honour of the founding of the village. The memorial sign depicts a Greek vase on a pedestal, on which the history of Velyka Novosilka is painted.

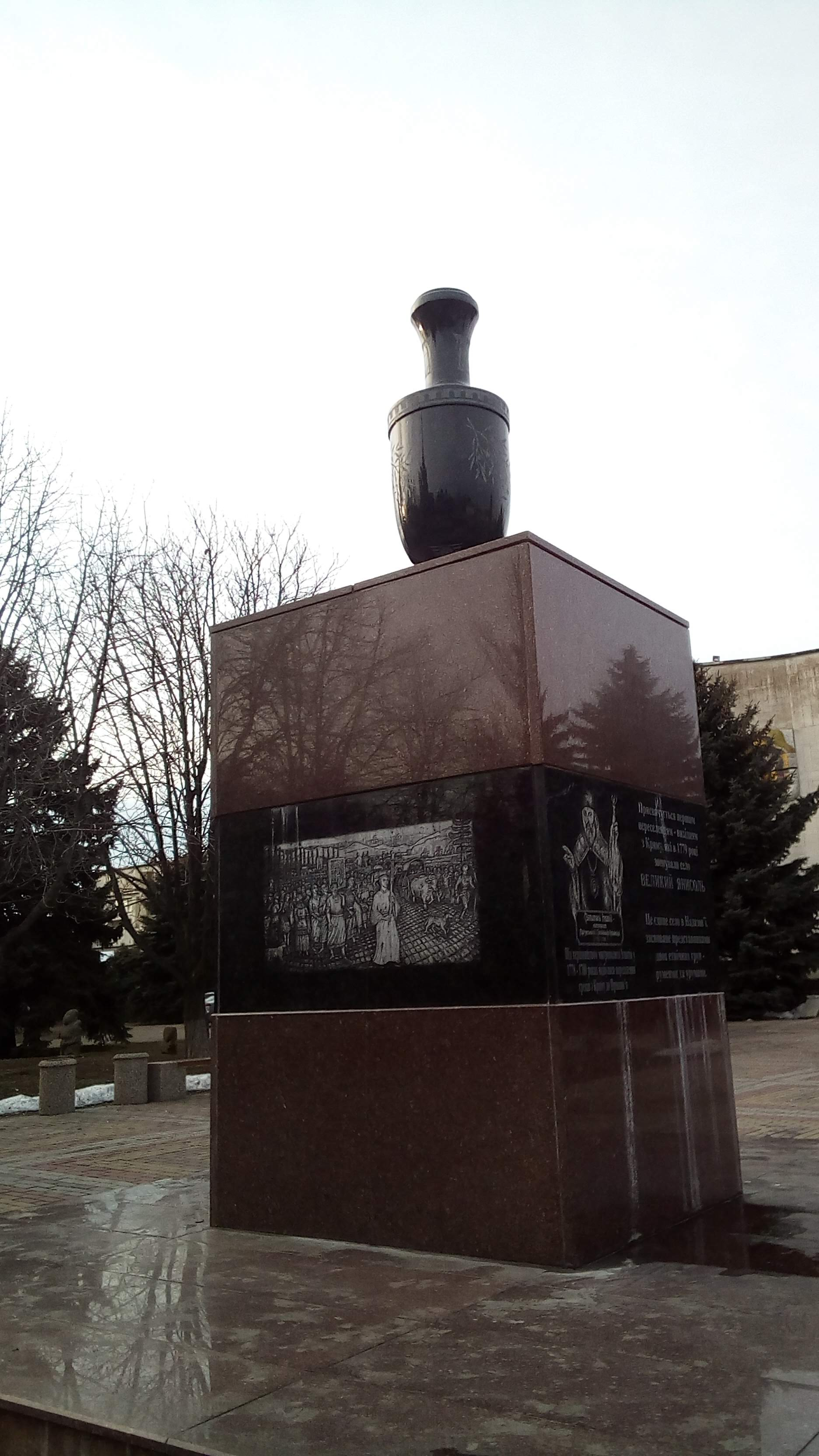
Memorial sign to the founding of the village

In 2017, the Ukrainian Security Service (SBU) detained a former MP who had organised rallies in Velyka Novoselka in support of the ‘DPR’ and a so-called referendum for secession from Ukraine.

In October 2017, the Velyka Novosilka hospital received new high-value diagnostic equipment. It also underwent renovations. On 20 June 2021, an updated version of the coat of arms was published on the official website of the Velyka Novosilka Hromada. The changes include a more modern design of the coat of arms and a change in the colour of the ground from Black to Green.

===== Russian invasion of Ukraine =====
During the start of the Russian invasion of Ukraine, Russian troops crossed the front line near Volnovakha in 2022. On 12 March, Russian troops made a major breakthrough from the direction of Volnovakha, breaking through the eastern half of the Velyka Novosilka-Volodymyrivka line. Russia claimed to have captured nearby Blahodatne and other villages in the south on 13 March, which was confirmed by DeepState on 4 April. The same day, Ukrainian announced the loss of Staromlynivka in the south. In May 2022, Ukraine's 53rd Mechanized Brigade was believed to be defending areas near Velyka Novosilka, according to Sebastien Roblin. On 13 April 2022, Russian troops conducted a heavy bombardment of the town of Velyka Novosilka, damaging residential buildings and communal infrastructure.

On 9 August, after almost three months, Russian forces again attempted to continue ground attacks towards the Donetsk-Zaporizhzhia Oblast border near Velyka Novosilka, but Ukrainian forces repelled the attack near Vremivka. On 21 and 31 August, Russian troops launched assault ground attacks in the direction of Velyka Novosilka, but without success. Constantly being on the front line, the village's infrastructure suffered heavy damage. There also were civilian casualties.

On 20 February 2023, all families with children were evacuated from Velyka Novosilka. In mid-June 2023, during the Ukrainian counteroffensive, Ukrainian forces pushed back the Russian troops from the outskirts of the settlement, recapturing the villages of Neskuchne, Blahodatne, Storozheve and Makarivka to the south in the process. According to the Centre for Defence Strategies (Ukraine), Velyka Novosilka was a vital important logistics centre for the Ukrainian forces involved in the counteroffensive.

A few months before the start of the Russian invasion, in December 2021, the Ukrainian government granted the Australian company European Lithium the mining rights for the Shevchenko deposit. In the summer of 2023, the CEO of European Lithium, Tony Sage, declared that the company would no longer lay claim to the Shevchenko field — it was too close to the front line. On 10 January 2024, Russians sent "approval documents" for lithium extraction in the region to the Russian Ministry of Natural Resources and Environment. Russian-Israeli writer Edward Topol argues that by seizing Ukrainian lithium, Russia aims to keep Russian momentum and pressure on the European energy market with a monopoly on European lithium.

The settlement again became a target of Russian forces in late 2024. After the fall of Vuhledar in October 2024, Russians swiftly advanced to the north, reaching the proximity of Velyka Novosilka and advancing on it from several axes. Russian forces pressed on and started storming the nearby village of Rozdolne on 23 November, with Velyka Novosilka coming under attack in late November.

In the campaign to capture the settlement, the Russian forces aimed to encircle the Ukrainian forces from north and west with a pincer movement, trying to push Ukrainian troops against the Mokri Yaly River's eastern bank (which runs through the north-western limits of the village) and cut off the road to Pokrovsk in the north. Capturing the village would secure high ground on the river's western bank and allow southern advances along the valley.

In early December, Russian troops captured the road near Novyi Komar, directly in the north, but lost it after Ukrainian reinforcements counterattacked. A renewed Russian offensive soon recaptured the road. Russian forces encircled Ukrainian defenders in Makarivka and Storozheve, though most troops escaped north. Russian units seized the heights near Neskuchne in the south and Vremivka in the east, overlooking the valley and Velyka Novosilka. To the west of Velyka Novosilka, Russian forces captured land north of occupied Rivnopil, narrowing the gap between the pincers. According to Meduza, the village was effectively surrounded by the end of December 2024, with supply routes cut and airstrikes targeting the river crossings.

On the night of 25–26 January 2025, the settlement was reported to have been almost entirely captured. The Russian army announced the capture of the settlement on 26 January. Ukraine's 110th Mechanized Brigade acknowledged a partial withdrawal from Velyka Novosilka to "avoid encirclement". DeepStateMap.Live map shown the settlement as completely captured on 28 January.

== Demographics ==
=== Language ===
The population in 2001 was 7,493, representing 91.1% of the 1989 figure. The demographic composition included 46% Ukrainians, 30% Greeks, 22% Russians, along with smaller numbers of Germans and Belarusians.

Distribution of population by native language according to Ukrainian 2001 Census:

Language	Number	Percentage
Russian	6041	81.80%
Ukrainian	1261	17.08%
Greek^{1}	63	0.85%
Armenian	9	0.12%
Belarusian	2	0.03%
German	1	0.01%
Other/did not specify	8	0.11%
Total	7385	100%

^{1} including Mariupol Greek and Urum

Historical population

Year	Pop.	±%
1817	1,181	—
1859	1,670	+41.4%
1885	2,208	+32.2%
1897	3,492	+58.2%
1908	4,497	+28.8%
1914	4,712	+4.8%
1920	5,238	+11.2%
1933	4,175	−20.3%
1939	4,824	+15.5%
1959	5,074	+5.2%
1970	6,637	+30.8%
1975	6,900	+4.0%
1979	7,399	+7.2%
1987	7,800	+5.4%
1989	8,222	+5.4%
1992	8,300	+0.9%
1998	7,700	−7.2%

Year	Pop.	±%
2002	7,493	−2.7%
2003	7,337	−2.1%
2004	7,160	−2.4%
2005	7,003	−2.2%
2006	6,871	−1.9%
2007	6,756	−1.7%
2008	6,599	−2.3%
2009	6,473	−1.9%
2010	6,378	−1.5%
2011	6,265	−1.8%
2012	6,194	−1.1%
2013	6,098	−1.5%
2014	5,992	−1.7%
2015	5,956	−0.6%
2019	5,570	−6.5%
2022	5,235	−6.0%

== Economy ==
During the years of independence, Velyka Novosilka became the centre of one of the largest agricultural districts of Donetsk Oblast. The main activities are crop production (mainly oilseeds and grains), as indicated by the blooming sunflower in the upper right part of the coat of arms, and large horned livestock (symbolized by the bull/turs) in the lower part of the coat of arms.

The Shevchenko deposit, in the nearby village of Shevchenko, holds one of the largest reserves of lithium in Ukraine. It received attention due to rising demand for lithium globally.

== Culture and sport ==
The village features two general education schools, a gymnasium, a vocational lyceum, and four preschools. Additionally, it houses a children's music school, a central district hospital, a central polyclinic, a cinema, a district cultural and health center, a historical museum, a memorial museum, a stadium, and a youth sports school (CYSS). The local newspaper "Rural Land" is also published here.

Velyka Novosilka twice hosted the Mega-Yorti (International Festival of Greek Culture) named after Patricha Donat Konstantinovich in 1989 and 1993.

In 1997, the football club "Prometheus" was founded in Velyka Novosilka, which played in competitions at the district and regional levels. In 2016, the Kolos stadium was reconstructed in the settlement.

=== Monuments ===
In honor of villagers who perished during the conflicts of 1918–1920 and World War II, seven memorials have been erected in the village. Within the territory of Velyka Novosilka, there are two notable nature reserves: the Neskuchne Forest, an entomological reserve known as a habitat for wild bees, and the Chervona Balka Pivnichna landscape reserve, home to approximately 200 species of vascular plants.

== Notable people ==
- Baltadzhi Pavlo Mytrofanovych – rebel ataman participant in the Russian Civil War, member of the anarcho-Makhnovist movement
- Vladimir Takhtamyshev (1890s–1935) – Ukrainian Greek participant in the Russian Civil War, member of the member of the anarcho-Makhnovist movement
- Kasyanenko Volodymyr Hryhorovych – Ukrainian Soviet anatomist, academician of the National Academy of Sciences of Ukraine (USSR)
- Maltabar Leonid Markovich – Soviet scientist in the field of viticulture
- Moroz Raisa Vasylivna – Ukrainian public figure, translator, publicist, writer of memoirs, participant in the dissident movement in the USSR
- Multykh Heorhii Minovych – Soviet Ukrainian scientist-historian, teacher, laureate of the State Prize of Ukraine in Science and Technology
- Taras Stepanenko (born 1989) – Ukrainian footballer, midfielder of FC Shakhtar Donetsk
- Mykola Shaparenko (born 1998) – is a Ukrainian footballer, midfielder of FC Dynamo Kyiv
- Demurenko Dmytro Serhiiovych – junior sergeant of the Armed Forces of Ukraine, a participant in the Russo-Ukrainian War
- Zavara Oleksandr Vasylovych – Ukrainian writer, publicist, critic and musician
