= Storozheve =

Storozheve may refer to:

- Storozheve, a village in Simferopol Raion in Crimea
- Storozheve, Donetsk Oblast
