= Neskuchne, Donetsk Oblast =

Village in Donetsk Oblast, Ukraine

Neskuchne Нескучне
- Village
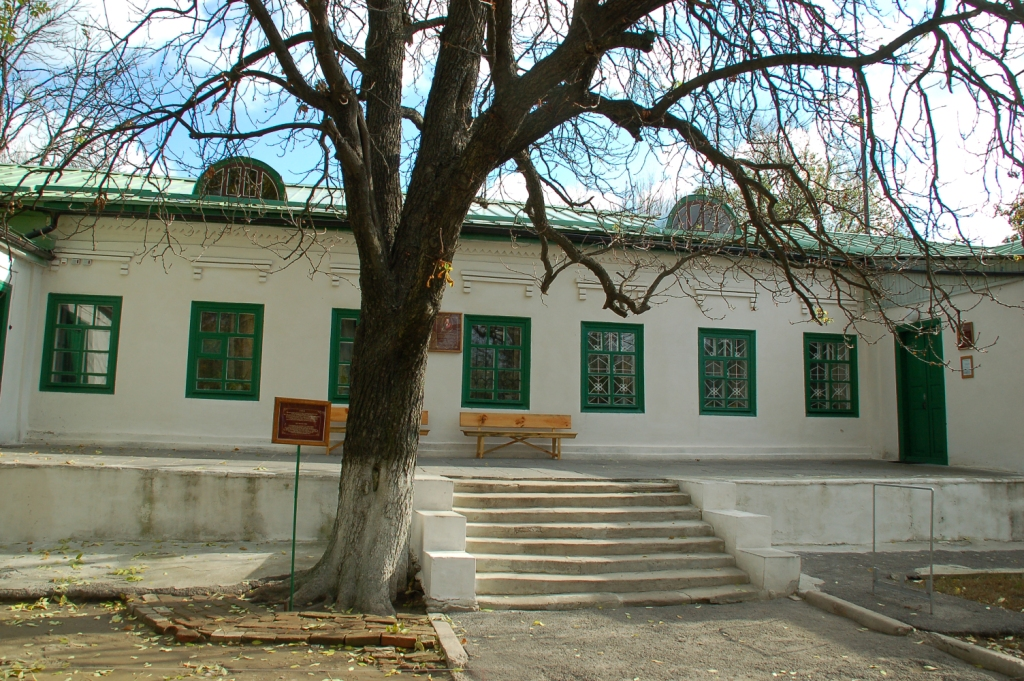
- House-Museum of Vladimir Nemirovich-Danchenko
- Interactive map of Neskuchne
- Location of Neskuchne within Donetsk Oblast Neskuchne (Ukraine)
- Coordinates: 47°49′12″N 36°48′32″E
- Country: Ukraine
- Oblast: Donetsk Oblast
- Raion: Volnovakha Raion
- Hromada: Velyka Novosilka settlement hromada

Population (2016)
  - Total: 644
- Time zone: UTC+2
  - Summer (DST): UTC+3 (EEST)
- Postal code: 85500
- Area code: +380 6243

Neskuchne (Ukrainian: Нескучне; Russian: Нескучное) is a village in Volnovakha Raion, Donetsk Oblast, Ukraine, on the western, left bank of the Mokri Yaly river. It is just south of the larger town of Velyka Novosilka and north of the village of Storozheve. It belongs to the Velyka Novosilka settlement hromada, one of the hromadas of Ukraine.

== Geography ==
The village is located on the left bank of the Mokri Yaly river. The distance to community center is about 5 km and passes by a local highway. The length of the village borders is from north to south 1 km 847 m, and from west to east 1 km 898 m. The area is 1,213 km².

== History ==
The village was founded in 1800. By the mid-20th century, the following names were used in parallel: Korfovo, Korkhovo. More than 10 burial mounds (3 thousand BC – 14th century) have been examined near Neskuchne. Ancient sculptures – stone women – have been preserved on the territory of the village. In the mid-19th century, Baron Korf founded the Neskuchnensky forest (now a landscape reserve of local significance). In 1856–72 and 1880–83, public and educational figure, publicist Nikolai Korf lived here for long periods. According to data from 1859, in the owner's village of Aleksandrovsky Uyezd Ekaterinoslav Governorate there lived 193 people (96 males and 97 females), there were 70 households, and there were 2 factories.

According to the 1897 census, the number of residents increased to 831 people (416 males and 415 females), all of whom were of the Orthodox faith. In 1908, in the village of Neskuchne, Mariupol uezd, Ekaterinoslav Governorate there lived 1,369 people (716 males and 653 females), and there were 181 households. The early 20th century manor house of Russian playwright Vladimir Nemirovich-Danchenko is in Neskuchne. From October 1941 to September 1943, it was under Nazi occupation.

=== Russian invasion of Ukraine ===
As a result of the Russian invasion of Ukraine, Neskuchne was occupied by the Russian Federation. Russian forces accidentally shelled their own positions near the village on 8 July 2022.

Since March 2023, the 7th Battalion Arei of the Ukrainian Volunteer Army had been preparing for recapture of the village. It had become an outpost of the Russian forces, with a complex geography: a hill on one side, and the Mokri Yaly river on the other. On a hill below the river there was a school in which a Russian fortified point was located. On the morning of June 7, the storming of the village began and on June 11, 2023, the village was liberated. During the assault, 6 soldiers of the battalion died.

This was confirmed by the Russian milbloggers. Ukraine recaptured the village on 4 June 2023 and on 10 June, it was reported to be liberated by the 7th Battalion Arei of the Ukrainian Volunteer Army of the 129th Territorial Defense Brigade of the Territorial Defense Forces.

On 13 January 2025, geo-located footages showed that Russian forces had recaptured the village in an offensive to capture the larger town of Velyka Novosilka in the north.

== Demographics ==
According to the 2001 Census, the village has a population of 733. 85.95% of residents were native Ukrainian speakers, 13.78% were native Russian speakers, and the remaining 0.14% were either native Gagauz or Greek (including Mariupol Greek and Urum) speakers.

== Notable people ==
=== Born ===
- Artem Mykhailovych Plysenko a military man, a veteran of the Second World War, hero of the Soviet Union.

=== Lived or worked ===
- Mykola Oleksandrovych Korf a teacher and educator, Zemstvo official, honorary member of the Geneva Academy of Sciences.
- Vladimir Nemirovich-Danchenko a theater actor, director and playwright.
- Anatoliy Denisovych Kosmatenko a Ukrainian writer.
- Mariya Lukivna Osadchuk a Ukrainian linguist, candidate of philological sciences, doctor of philosophy, professor.

== See also ==
- Donetsk People's Republic
