= Oleksiivka, Volnovakha Raion, Donetsk Oblast =

Village in Donetsk Oblast, Ukraine

Oleksiivka Олексіївка
- Village
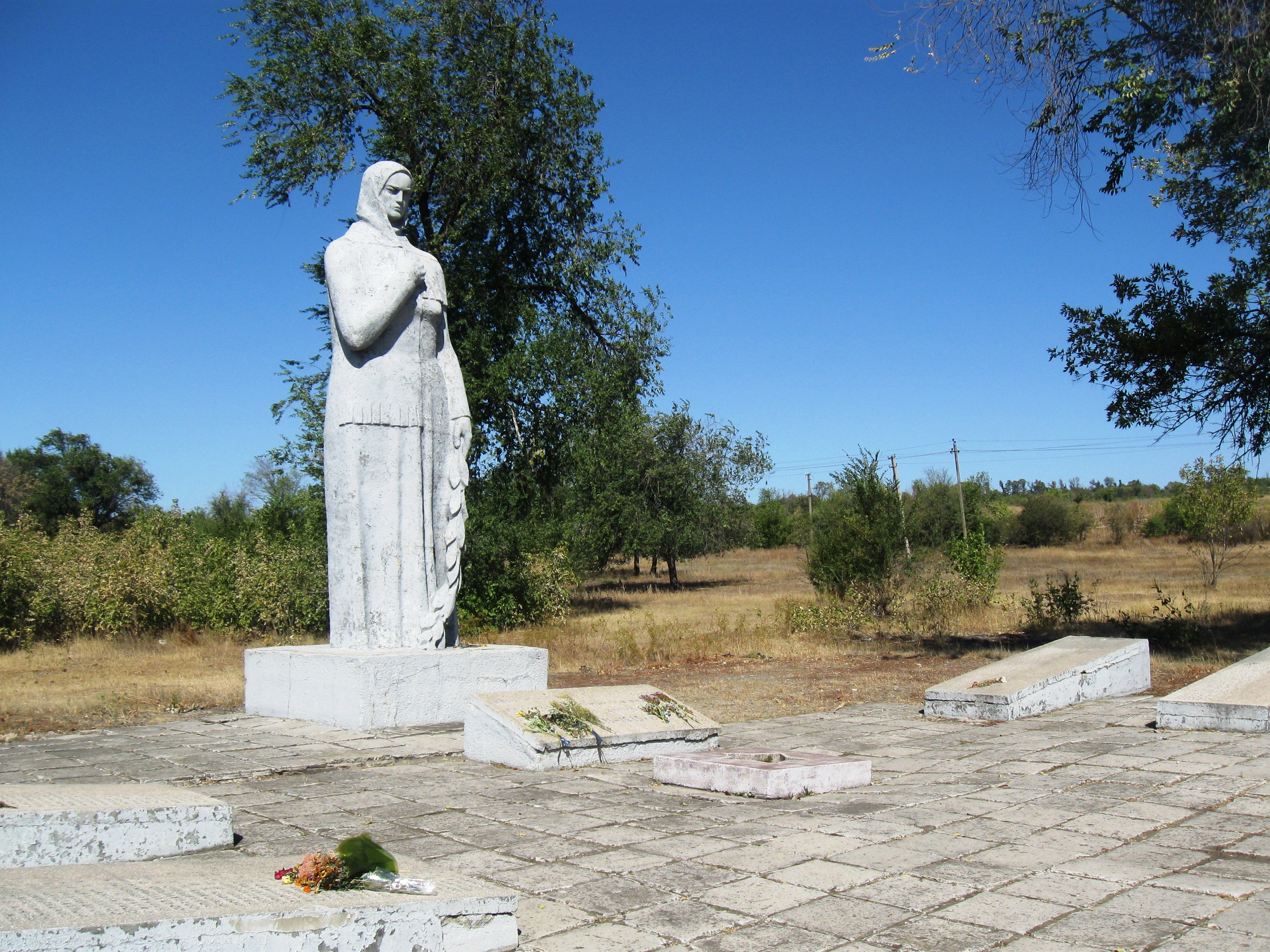
- Interactive map of Oleksiivka
- Location of Oleksiivka Oleksiivka (Ukraine)
- Coordinates: 48°1′7″N 36°56′59″E
- Country: Ukraine
- Oblast: Donetsk Oblast
- Raion: Volnovakha Raion
- Hromada: Velyka Novosilka settlement hromada
- Founded: 1775
- Elevation: 115 m (377 ft)

Population (2001)
  - Total: 1,163
- Time zone: UTC+2
  - Summer (DST): UTC+3
- Postal code: 85530
- Area code: +380 6243

Oleksiivka (Ukrainian: Олексіївка; Russian: Алексеевка) is a village in Velyka Novosilka settlement hromada of Volnovakha Raion, Donetsk Oblast in Ukraine. The village is located on the right bank of the Vovcha River and borders the territory of the village of Troitske.

== History ==
Oleksiivka is one of the oldest settlements of the Zaporozhian Cossacks. In ancient times, there was a Cossack pier here, one of the coastal stations for all the Cossacks who sailed from the Sich to Samara, Vovcha, Mius to the Sea of Azov.

Around 1660, a special secret Cossack path to Kalmius and Kalmiuska palanka was laid through the settlement by the Zaporozhians . By order of Kish, the Zaporozhian Cossacks who lived here were obliged to accept all swimmers and travelers and keep them while they were at the stop. The village had its own chapel, in which the hieromonk of the Kyiv Mezhyhirya Monastery served.

According to data from 1859 , the state-owned village of Bakhmut uezd of Yekaterinoslav Governorate had a population of 2,441 people (1,220 males and 1,221 females), 316 households, an Orthodox church, and 2 fairs per year.

As of 1886, the former state village of Andriyivska Volost had a population of 2,783 people, 440 households, an Orthodox church, a school, and a shop.

According to the 1897 census, the number of residents increased to 3,709 people (1,856 males and 1,853 females), of whom 3,680 were of the Orthodox faith.

In 1908, the village had a population of 5,340 people (2,657 males and 2,683 females), and there were 692 households.

=== Recent history ===
On February 13, 2015, Oleg Chykhun, a soldier of the 28th Brigade, suffered multiple fatal shrapnel wounds near the village of Oleksiivka.

=== Russo-Ukrainian War ===
During the Russo-Ukrainian War, Oleksiivka first came in proximity of hostilities when Russian forces first entered the village on May 30, 2025. Russian forces captured the village by June 11, 2025. Between 14–16 June 2025, Ukrainian forces gained a foothold on the northwestern part of the town, with the village still being fully claimed as captured by Russian forces. On July 28, 2025, Russian forces fully recaptured the village.

== Population ==
According to the 2001 Ukrainian census, the village's population was 1,163 people. The main languages of the village were:

- Russian 98.02% (1,140 people)
- Ukrainian 1.72% (20 people)
- Other/not specified 0.26% (3 people)

== People ==
The following were born in the village:

- Gladkyi Pavlo Makarovych (1885–1971) was an orientalist, public and political figure in the Far East.
- Ostanyi Halyna Opanasivnah (1929–2005) - a Ukrainian artist.
