= Highway H15 (Ukraine) =

Highway in Ukraine

Highway H15
- Автошлях Н15
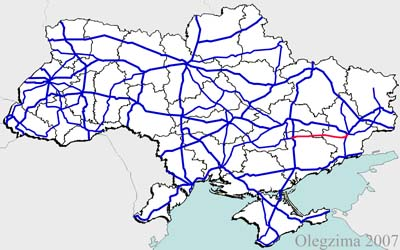

Route information
- Length: 208.8 km (129.7 mi)

Major junctions
- West end: M 18 in Zaporizhzhia
- East end: H 20 in Donetsk

Location
- Country: Ukraine
- Oblasts: Zaporizhzhia, Dnipropetrovsk, Donetsk

Highway system
- Roads in Ukraine; State Highways
← H 14	→ H 16

Highway H15 is a Ukrainian national highway (H-highway) connecting Zaporizhzhia with Donetsk. It passes through Vil'nians'k, Mykhailo-Lukasheve, and Kolos in Vilniansk Raion, Rodyns'ke, Petropavlivka, Novomykolaivka in Novomykolaivka Raion; Kyivs'ke and Trudove in Bilmak Raion; Novokasyanivka in Novomykolaivka Raion; Zelena Dolyna, Pysantsi, Mechetne, Orly, Dibrova, and Havrylivke in Synelnykove Raion; Iskra, Piddubne-Tolstoi, Perebudova-Komar, Ordradne, Bahatyr, Kostayantynopil', Andriivka, and Ulakly in Velyka Novosilka Raion; Dachne in Marinka Raion; Kurakhove, and Maksymil'yanivka-Heorhiivka-Marinka. The H15 has a brief concurrency with highway T-04-01 in Synelnykove Raion.

== War in Donbas ==
Significant armed conflict has occurred along and near the H15 during the Russo-Ukrainian War.

== Main route ==
Main route and connections to/intersections with other highways in Ukraine.

Marker	Main settlements	Notes	Highway Interchanges
0 km	Zaporizhzhia		E105 M 18
	Vil'nians'k		T0445
	Novomykolaivka		T0408
	Oleksandrivka and Pokrovske in Pokrovskyi		T0401
	Havrylivke in Pokrovskyi		T0427
	Bahatyr in Velikonovosilkivsky		T0518
	Kostayantynopil' and Andriivka in Velikonovosilkivsky		T0515
208.8 km	Donetsk		H 20 T0508

== See also ==
- Roads in Ukraine
