= Zelene Pole, Volnovakha Raion, Donetsk Oblast =

Village in Donetsk Oblast, Ukraine

Zelene Pole Зелене Поле
- Village
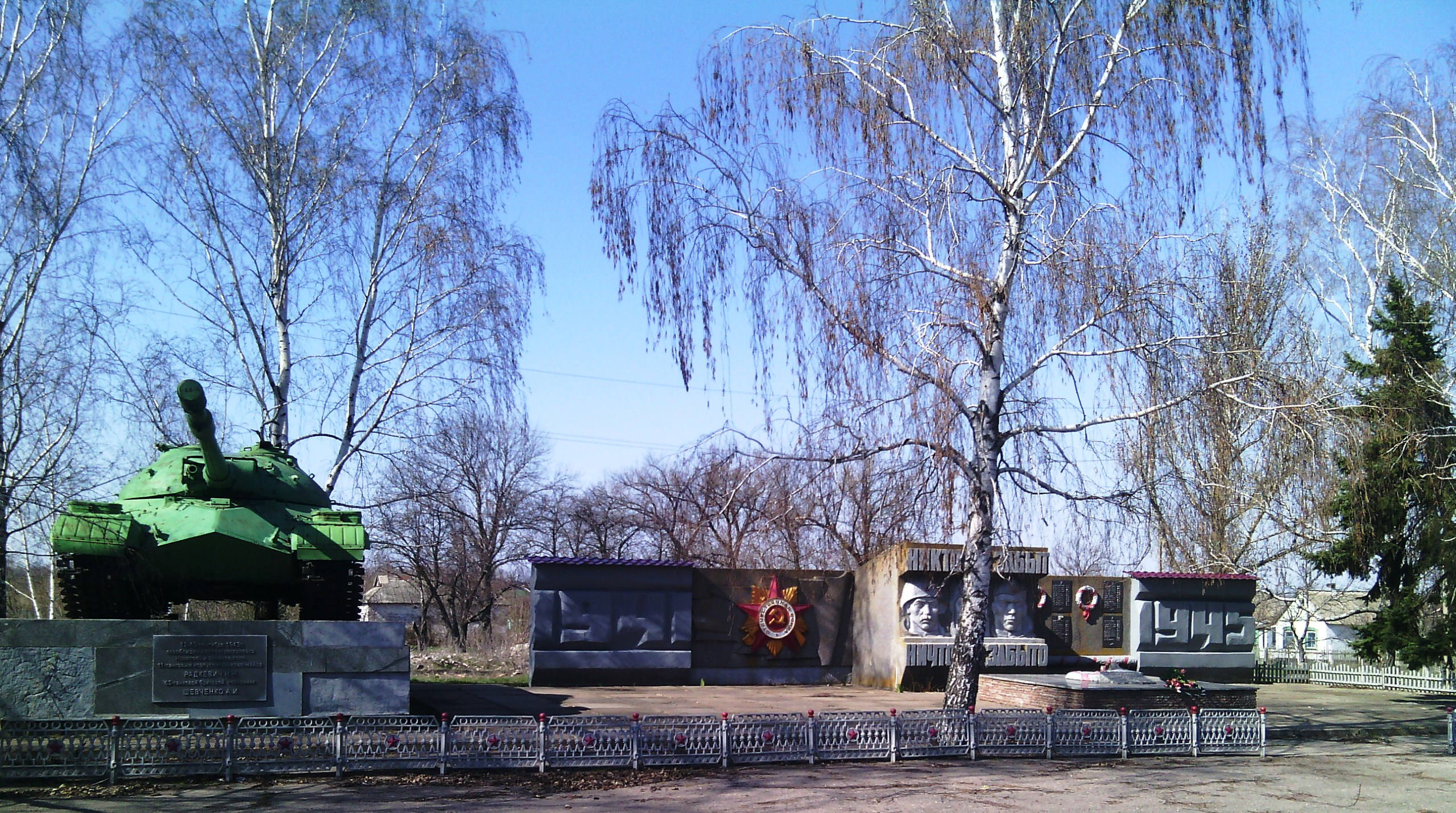
- World War II memorial in Zelene Pole
- Interactive map of Zelene Pole
- Location of Zelene Pole within Ukraine Zelene Pole (Ukraine)
- Coordinates: 47.83°N 36.620833°E
- Country: Ukraine
- Oblast: Donetsk Oblast
- Raion: Volnovakha Raion
- Hromada: Velyka Novosilka settlement hromada
- Founded: 1926

Area
  - Total: 1.021 km^{2} (0.394 sq mi)
- Elevation: 147 m (482 ft)

Population (2001 census)
  - Total: 578
  - Density: 566/km^{2} (1,470/sq mi)
- Time zone: UTC+2 (EET)
  - Summer (DST): UTC+3 (EEST)
- Postal code: 85525
- Area code: +380 6243

Zelene Pole (Ukrainian: Зелене Поле; Russian: Зелёное Поле) is a village in Volnovakha Raion (district) in Donetsk Oblast of eastern Ukraine, at about 89.2 kilometres (55.4 mi) west by south from the centre of Donetsk city and at about 1 kilometre (0.62 mi) west from the border of Zaporizhzhia Oblast. It belongs to Velyka Novosilka settlement hromada, one of the hromadas of Ukraine.

The village came under attacks by Russian forces in 2022, during the Russian invasion of Ukraine. and in May 28, 2025 Russia claimed that they captured Zelene Pole
