= Novyi Komar =

Rural locality in Donetsk Oblast, Ukraine

Novyi Komar Новий Комар
- Village
- Interactive map of Novyi Komar
- Location of Novyi Komar within Ukraine Novyi Komar (Donetsk Oblast)
- Coordinates: 47°53′00″N 36°50′17″E
- Country: Ukraine
- Oblast: Donetsk Oblast
- Raion: Volnovakha Raion
- Hromada: Velyka Novosilka settlement hromada

Area
  - Total: 1.016 km^{2} (0.392 sq mi)
- Elevation: 105 m (344 ft)

Population (2022)
  - Total: 500
  - Density: 490/km^{2} (1,300/sq mi)
- Time zone: UTC+2 (EET)
  - Summer (DST): UTC+3 (EEST)
- Postal code: 85500
- Area code: +380 6243
- KATOTTH: UA14040010100012050

Novyi Komar (Ukrainian: Новий Комар; Russian: Новый Комар; Urum: Йаны Камара, romanized: Yany Camara) is a village in Velyka Novosilka settlement hromada, Volnovakha Raion, Donetsk Oblast, eastern Ukraine. It is located 73.02 kilometres (45.37 mi) west by south (WbS) from the centre of Donetsk city.

== Geography ==
The settlement lies on the right bank of the Mokri Yaly river. The absolute height is 105 metres above sea level.

== History ==
=== Russian invasion of Ukraine ===
During the Russo-Ukrainian War and the Russian invasion of Ukraine, fighting broke out near the village as part of a Russian offensive in the area in late 2024. Russian sources claimed the village was occupied by Russian forces during fighting between 1 and 2 December.

On 5 December, DeepStateMap.Live reported the Ukrainian 48th Separate Assault Battalion to have re-taken control over the village. Like neighbouring Velyka Novosilka, the settlement is strategically important for the defensive lines in Donetsk Oblast.

On 19 December, a Ukrainian military observer said that Russian forces had recaptured the village.

== Demographics ==
As of the 2001 Ukrainian census, the settlement had 534 inhabitants, whose native languages were 8.80% Ukrainian and 89.89% Russian.
