= Novosilka, Volnovakha Raion, Donetsk Oblast =

Village in Donetsk Oblast, Ukraine

Novosilka Новосілка
- Village
- Interactive map of Novosilka
- Location of Novosilka within Ukraine Novosilka (Ukraine)
- Coordinates: 47.838889°N 36.685278°E
- Country: Ukraine
- Oblast: Donetsk Oblast
- Raion: Volnovakha Raion
- Hromada: Velyka Novosilka rural hromada
- Founded: 1882

Area
  - Total: 0.76 km^{2} (0.29 sq mi)
- Elevation: 142 m (466 ft)

Population (2001 census)
  - Total: 104
  - Density: 140/km^{2} (350/sq mi)
- Time zone: UTC+2 (EET)
  - Summer (DST): UTC+3 (EEST)
- Postal code: 85535

Novosilka (Ukrainian: Новосілка; Russian: Новосёлка) is a village in Volnovakha Raion (district) in Donetsk Oblast of eastern Ukraine, at about 83.5 kilometres (51.9 mi) west by south from the centre of Donetsk city.

The village was unsuccessfully assaulted by the Russian forces in May 2022, during the Russian invasion of Ukraine. It was captured by Russian forces in February 2025 following a mechanized assault.
