= Kostiantynopil =

Village in Donetsk Oblast, Ukraine

Kostiantynopil Костянтинопіль
- Village
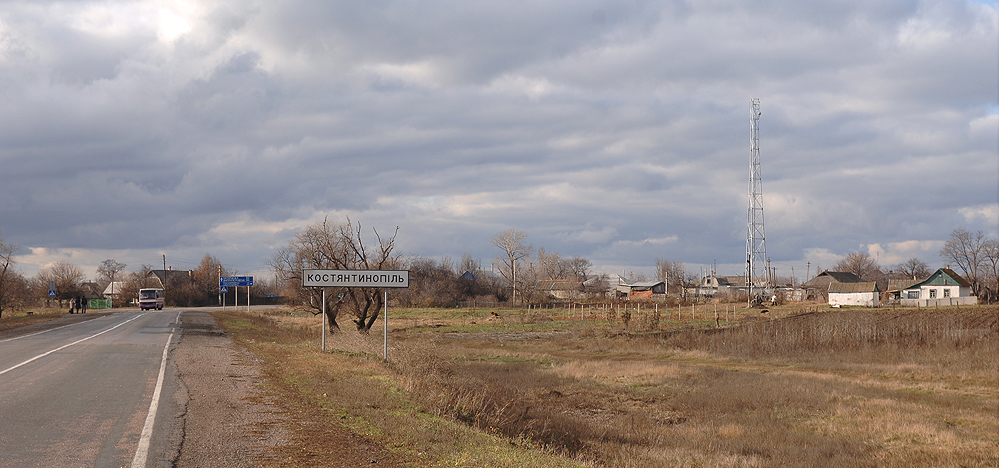

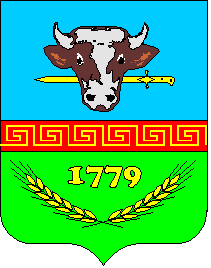
- Seal
- Interactive map of Kostiantynopil
- Location of Kostiantynopil Kostiantynopil (Ukraine)
- Coordinates: 47°59′55″N 37°2′15″E
- Country: Ukraine
- Oblast: Donetsk Oblast
- Raion: Volnovakha Raion
- Hromada: Velyka Novosilka settlement hromada
- Founded: 1779
- Elevation: 101 m (331 ft)

Population (2001)
  - Total: 1,076
- Time zone: UTC+2
  - Summer (DST): UTC+3
- Postal code: 85542
- Area code: +380 6243

Kostiantynopil (Ukrainian: Костянтинопіль; Russian: Константинополь, romanized: Konstantinopol; Greek: Κωνσταντινούπολις) is a village in Velyka Novosilka settlement hromada of Volnovakha Raion, Donetsk Oblast in Ukraine. Kostiantynopil is the center of the village council. It is located at the confluence of the Sukhi Yaly and Vovcha rivers, 20 km from the Roia railway station. The village council also includes the settlement of Ulakly. The H15 highway connecting Donetsk and Zaporizhzhia also passes through this village.

== History ==
The village was founded by Nadazovia Greek settlers from Crimea, in the villages of Luchyste, Alushta, Heneralske, Malorichenske and Soniachnohirske in 1779. The village received its name from the Constantinople that was the capital of the Byzantine Empire at its founding, which merited a great sacrifice known as a hecatomb (a sacrifice of two hundred bulls).

During the Soviet era, the village was home to the central estate of the Michurin collective farm. The artel has 2,115 hectares of arable land, including 200 hectares of irrigated land. The production area of the farm is meat and dairy farming and the cultivation of grain crops. The artel also engages in gardening and viticulture, which also includes the farming of melons. 5 workers of the collective farm have been awarded orders and medals.

The village had an eight-year school, a library, and a veterinary clinic. A children's factory was opened, and household workshops were operating. There were 6 branches of the regional association "Agricultural Machinery".

=== Russo-Ukrainian War ===
During the Russo-Ukrainian War, Kostiantynopil first came in proximity of hostilities between Russian and Ukrainian forces in February 2025. Russian forces first entered the village on February 27. Russian forces captured the village by March 9. On March 17, Ukrainian forces launched counterattack on the settlement, recontesting the village. The Russians recaptured the settlement of April 29.

== Population ==
According to data from 1859, the state village of Mariupol Greek District, Alexandrovsky Uyezd, Yekaterinoslav Governorate, had a population of 900 people (485 males and 415 females), 281 households, and an Orthodox church.

As of 1886, the Greek colony of Bogatyrsk volost, Mariupol Uzyed, Ekaterinoslav province, had a population of 1,107 people, 189 households, an Orthodox church, a school, 2 shops and 2 brick factories.

According to the 1897 census, the number of residents increased to 2,053 people (1,098 males and 955 females), of whom 2,034 were Eastern Orthodox.

In 1908, the Greek settlement had a population of 2,423 (1,234 males and 1,189 females), and 360 households.

According to the 2001 Ukrainian census, the village's population was 1,076 people. The main languages of the village were:

- Russian 75.84%
- Ukrainian 14.78%
- Greek (including Mariupol Greek and Urum) 1.02%
- Moldovan (Romanian) 0.09%

== Prominent natives ==
- Maria Lukivna Osadchuk (born 1939) - a Ukrainian linguist.
- Naftaly Frenkel (1883–1960) - a well-known figure of the NKVD of the Soviet Union before the October Revolution - a famous Odesan millionaire, businessman and criminal authority, in Soviet times - a prisoner of the Solovki prison camp, later - the head of the construction of the White Sea–Baltic Canal and the Baikal–Amur Mainline, the first head of the Chief Directorate of Railroad Construction Camps of the USSR.

== Notes ==
- History of cities and villages of the Ukrainian SSR . — K .: Main editorial office of the Ukrainian Academy of Sciences of the Ukrainian SSR . — 15,000 copies.
