= Blahodatne, Velyka Novosilka settlement hromada, Volnovakha Raion, Donetsk Oblast =

Blahodatne Благодатне
- Rural settlement
- Interactive map of Blahodatne
- Location within Donetsk Oblast Location within Ukraine
- Coordinates: 47°47′47″N 36°48′55″E
- Country: Ukraine
- Oblast: Donetsk Oblast
- Raion: Volnovakha Raion
- Hromada: Velyka Novosilka settlement hromada
- Elevation: 111 m (364 ft)

Population
  - Estimate (2015): 564
- Time zone: UTC+2
  - Summer (DST): UTC+3
- KATOTTH: UA14040010230049589

Blahodatne (Ukrainian: Благода́тне), known as Oktiabr until 2016, is a rural settlement in Velyka Novosilka settlement hromada, Volnovakha Raion, Donetsk Oblast, Ukraine. It is on the opposite side of the Mokri Yaly river from Storozheve and three kilometers south of Velyka Novosilka. Population: 564 (2015 est.)

== Geography ==
The settlement lies on the right bank of the Mokri Yaly river. The absolute height is 111 metres above sea level.

== History ==
=== Russian invasion of Ukraine ===
Blahodatne was occupied by Russian forces during the Russo-Ukrainian War. It was recaptured by Ukraine in June 2023 and was lost to Russian forces again in December 2024.

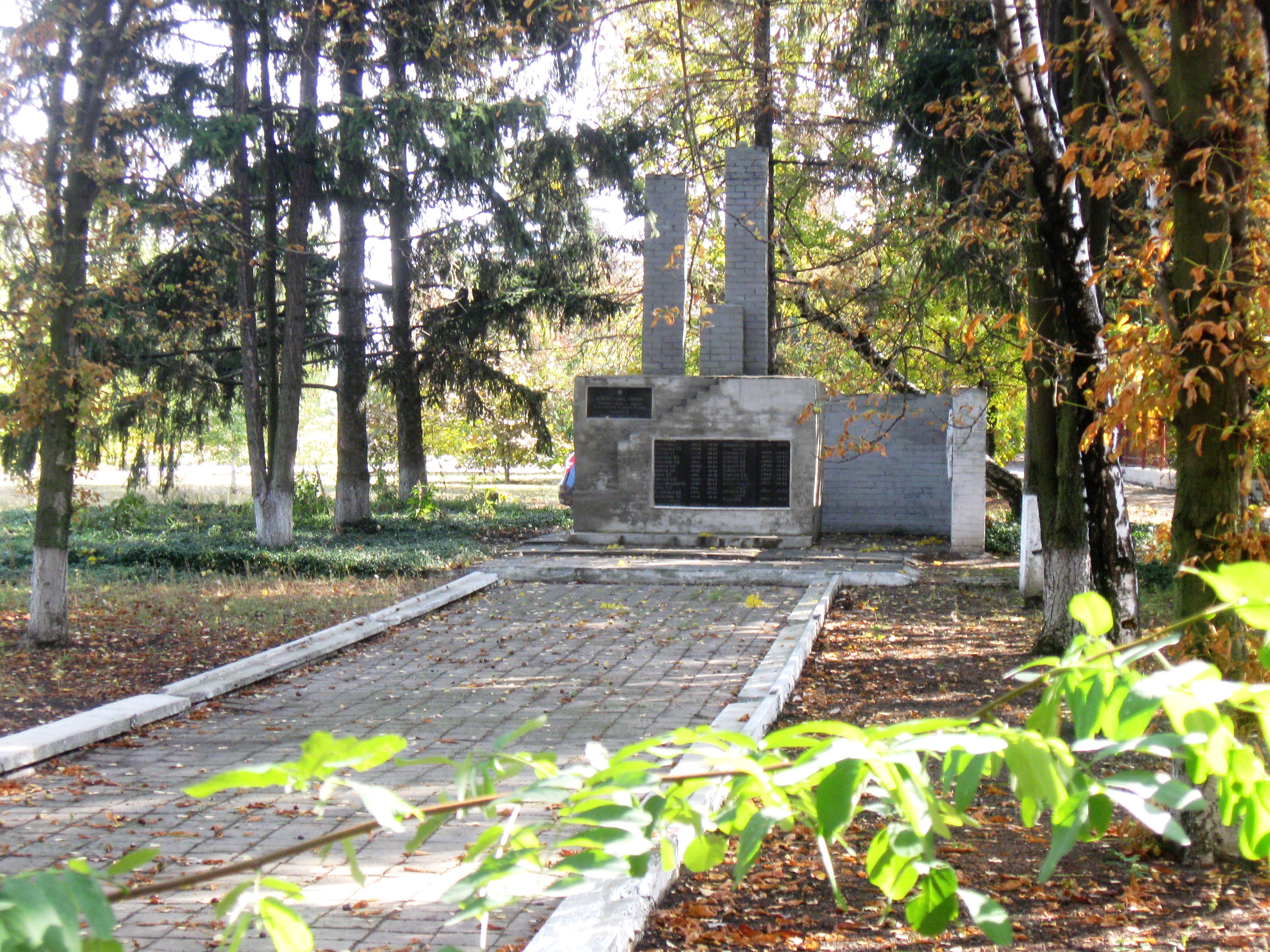
World War II memorial
