= Velyka Novosilka settlement hromada =

Velyka Novosilka settlement hromada Великоновосілківська селищна громада
- Hromada
- Interactive map of Velyka Novosilka settlement hromada
- Country: Ukraine
- Province: Donetsk Oblast
- District: Volnovakha Raion

Government

Population
  - Total: 18,710

Velyka Novosilka settlement hromada (Ukrainian: Великоновосілківська селищна громада) is a hromada of Ukraine, located in Volnovakha Raion, Donetsk Oblast. Its administrative center is the town of Velyka Novosilka.

It was formed in 2020, and has a total population of 18,710.

During the Russian invasion of Ukraine, on 4 July 2022, Ukrainian President Volodymyr Zelenskyy appointed Serhiy Dmytrovych Yashchenko as head of a military administration of the hromada.

The hromada includes 29 settlements: 1 town (Velyka Novosilka), 21 villages:

- Andriivka
- Bahatyr
- Kostiantynopil
- Makarivka
- Neskuchne
- Novopil
- Novosilka
- Novoukrainka
- Novyi Komar
- Oleksiivka
- Petropavlivka
- Rivnopil
- Shakhtarske
- Shevchenko
- Slovianka
- Staromaiorske
- Storozheve
- Ulakly
- Vremivka
- Zelene Pole
- Zelenyi Kut

And 7 rural-type settlements: Blahodatne, Odradne, Rozdolne, Rozlyv, Urozhaine, Yasna Poliana, and Zolota Nyva.

== See also ==
- List of hromadas of Ukraine
