= Bahatyr =

Village in Donetsk Oblast

Bahatyr Багатир
- Village
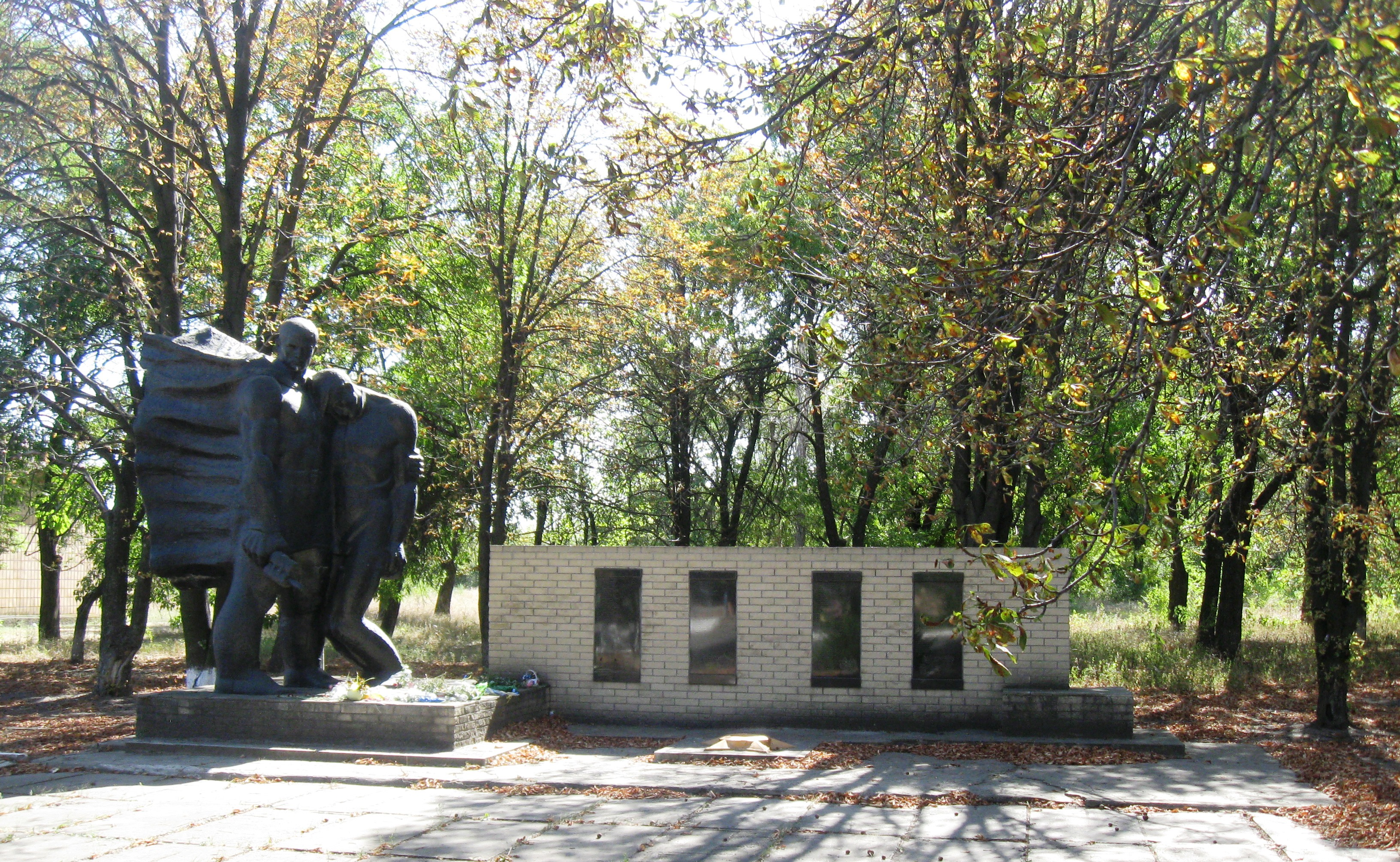
- Monument to the participants in the Russian Civil War and Soviet soldiers in Bahatyr.

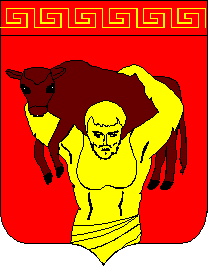
- Coat of arms

- Location within Donetsk Oblast Location within Ukraine
- Coordinates: 47°59′34″N 36°56′11″E
- Country: Ukraine
- Oblast: Donetsk Oblast
- Raion: Volnovakha Raion
- Hromada: Velyka Novosilka settlement hromada

Population (2025)
  - Total: 55

Bahatyr (Ukrainian: Багатир; Russian: Богатырь, romanized: Bogatyr) is a village in Velyka Novosilka settlement hromada, Volnovakha Raion, Donetsk Oblast, Ukraine.

== History ==
On 30 August 2023, during the Russian invasion of Ukraine the Russian military shelled the village using the S-300 missile system, killing two civilians and wounding seven. On 12 October 2023, the Russians again shelled the village using the Smerch missile system, killing one child and injuring another child and a woman. The settlement allegedly was captured by Russia on 17 May 2025. The capture of the village by the Russian army was definitively confirmed on 29 June, after two long weeks of fighting.

== Demographics ==
According to the 2001 Ukrainian census, the village had a population of 1695 people. In terms of native language, 7.61% of them spoke Ukrainian, 90.97% spoke Russian and 1.18% spoke Greek (including Mariupol Greek and Urum).
