= Ulakly =

Ulakly Улакли
- Village
- Interactive map of Ulakly
- Location of Velyka Novosilka within Donetsk Oblast Ulakly (Ukraine)
- Coordinates: 47°59′46″N 37°05′13″E
- Country: Ukraine
- Oblast: Donetsk Oblast
- Raion: Volnovakha Raion
- Hromada: Velyka Novosilka settlement hromada

Population (2001)
  - Total: 867

Ulakly (Ukrainian: Улакли; Russian: Улаклы; Greek: Ουλακλί; Urum: Улахлы, romanized: Ulahly) is a village in Velyka Novosilka settlement hromada, Volnovakha Raion, Donetsk Oblast, Ukraine.

== History ==
Ulakly was founded by ethnic Greek migrants from a Crimean village, also called Ulakly (now Hlybokyi Yar). The village in Donetsk Oblast was named after the original Crimean village, as was common with Greek migrants to the Azov region. In 1892, it had a population of 309 people. In this era, it was also alternatively known as Dzhemrek (Russian: Джемрекъ; Ukrainian: Джемрек) or Zhemrek (Russian: Жемрекъ).

On 24 May 2022, during the Russian invasion of Ukraine, Ulakly was shelled by the Russian military. On 21 February 2025, Ulakly was captured by Russian forces.

== Demographics ==
According to the 2001 Ukrainian census, the village had a population of 867 people. Their native languages were 71.86% Russian, 10.03% Greek (including Mariupol Greek and Urum), 2.08% Ukrainian, 0.46% Moldovan (Romanian) and 0.12% Belarusian.

== Bibliography ==
- Rovinsky, P. (1892). "Маріупольскіе Греки". Zhivai͡a starina: Perīodicheskoe izdanīe (in Russian). 2 (2).
