= Storozheve, Donetsk Oblast =

Village in Donetsk Oblast, Ukraine

Storozheve Сторожеве
- Village
- Interactive map of Storozheve
- Location of Storozhove in Donetsk Oblast Storozheve (Donetsk Oblast)
- Coordinates: 47.799167°N 36.7975°E
- Country: Ukraine
- Oblast: Donetsk Oblast
- Raion: Volnovakha Raion
- Hromada: Velyka Novosilka settlement hromada

Area
  - Total: 0.973 km^{2} (0.376 sq mi)
- Elevation: 110 m (360 ft)

Population (2001 census)
  - Total: 96
  - Density: 99/km^{2} (260/sq mi)
- Time zone: UTC+2 (EET)
  - Summer (DST): UTC+3 (EEST)
- Postal code: 85550
- Area code: +380 6243

Storozheve (Ukrainian: Сторожеве; Russian: Сторожевое) is a village in Velyka Novosilka settlement hromada, Volnovakha Raion, Donetsk Oblast, Ukraine. It is on the opposite side of the Mokri Yaly river from Blahodatne and about 79.09 kilometres (49.14 mi) southwest by west (SWbW) of the centre of Donetsk city. The population was 96 at the 2001 Ukrainian census.

In March 2022, the settlement was occupied by the Russian Armed Forces during the Russo-Ukrainian war. It was liberated by the Ukrainian forces in June 2023. Russian forces recaptured the settlement in December 2024 during an offensive towards Velyka Novosilka.
