= Volnovakha Raion =

Subdivision of Donetsk Oblast, Ukraine

Volnovakha Raion Волноваський район
- Raion
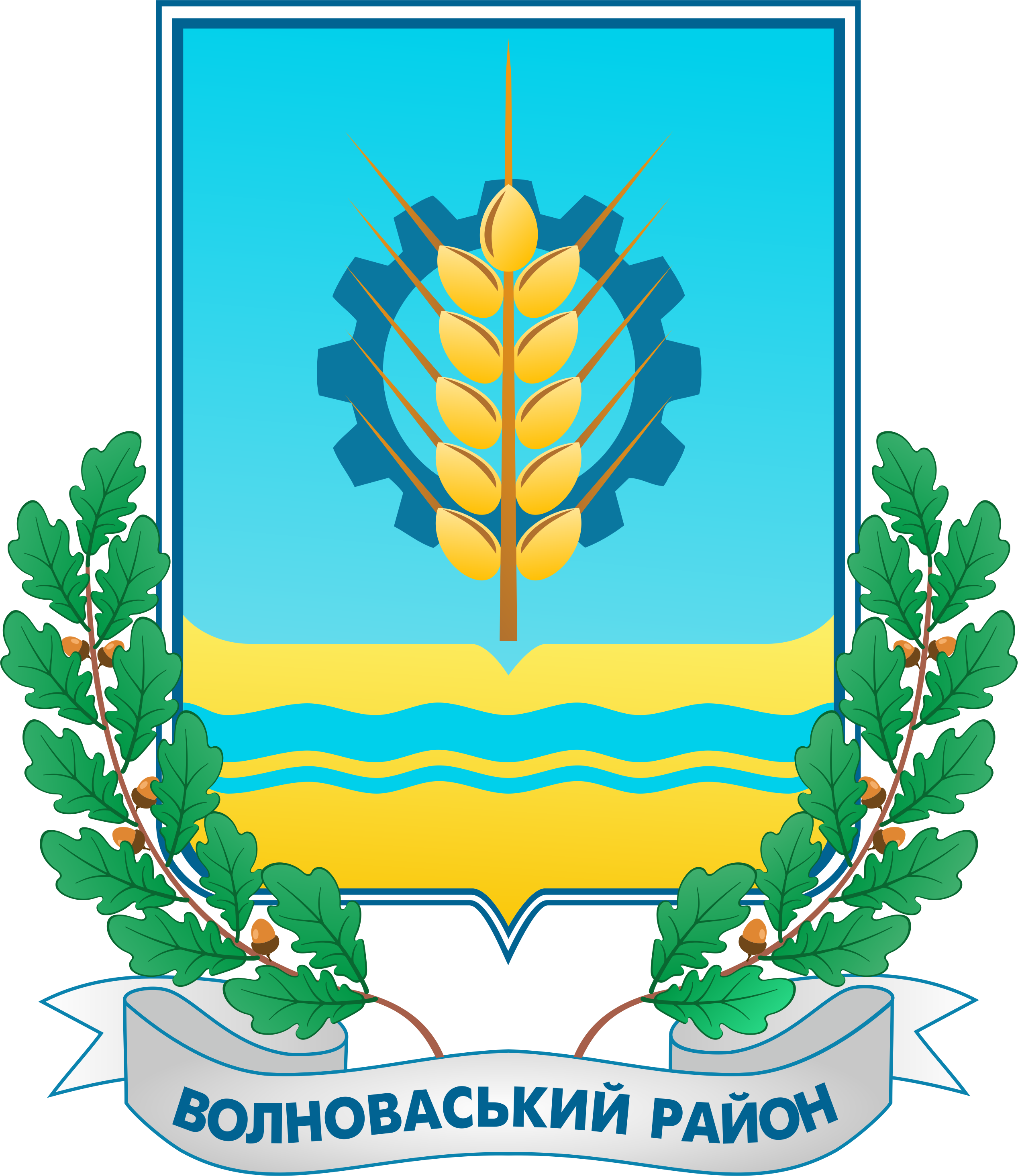
- Flag Coat of arms
- Interactive map of Volnovakha Raion
- Coordinates: 47°40′N 37°15′E
- Country: Ukraine
- Oblast: Donetsk Oblast
- Established: 1923
- Admin. center: Volnovakha
- Subdivisions: 8 hromadas

Government
  - Governor: Volodymyr Nesterenko

Area
  - Total: 4,449.1 km^{2} (1,717.8 sq mi)

Population (2022)
  - Total: 139,014
  - Density: 31.245/km^{2} (80.925/sq mi)
- Time zone: UTC+02:00 (EET)
  - Summer (DST): UTC+03:00 (EEST)
- Postal index: 85700-84791
- Area code: +380 6244
- Website: volnovrda.gov.ua

Volnovakha Raion (Ukrainian: Волноваський район, romanized: Volnovas'kyj rajon) is one of the eight raions (administrative districts) of Donetsk Oblast, in southeastern Ukraine. Its administrative center is in the city of Volnovakha. The raion's population is 139,014 (2022 estimate).

== History ==
In September 1959, when Olhynka Raion was abolished, part of its former territory was transferred to Volnovakha Raion.

On 9 December 2014, the Verkhovna Rada, Ukraine's national parliament, changed the boundaries and area of the Volnovakha Raion to encompass 2,549.44 km^{2} (984.34 mi^{2}) following the events surrounding the War in Donbas. Subsequently, the Governor of Donetsk Oblast Oleksandr Kikhtenko adopted a resolution moving the administrative center of Novoazovsk Raion to the settlement of Vynohradne, the administrative center of Telmanove Raion to the urban-type settlement of Myrne, and the administrative center of Yasynuvata Raion to the urban-type settlement of Ocheretyne. The January 2020 estimate of the raion population was 95,805 (2020 est.)

On 18 July 2020, as part of the administrative reform of Ukraine, the number of raions of Donetsk Oblast was reduced to eight, of which only five were controlled by the government, and the area of Volnovakha Raion was significantly expanded. The raion's population is 139,014 (2022 estimate).

== Subdivisions ==
After the reform in July 2020, the raion consists of 8 hromadas:

- Khlibodarivka rural hromada
- Komar rural hromada
- Myrne settlement hromada
- Olhynka settlement hromada
- Staromlynivka rural hromada
- Velyka Novosilka settlement hromada
- Volnovakha urban hromada
- Vuhledar urban hromada

== Demographics ==
According to the 2001 Ukrainian Census

Ethnicity	Number	Proportion
Ukrainians	72,346	78.2%
Russians	15,128	16.4%
Greeks	2,959	3.2%
Belarusians	494	0.5%
Armenians	260	0.3%
Moldovans	248	0.3%

== See also ==
- Administrative divisions of Donetsk Oblast
