= Pokrovsk offensive =

Battle in the Russo-Ukrainian war from 2024 to 2026

- Part of the eastern front of the Russo-Ukrainian war (2022–present)
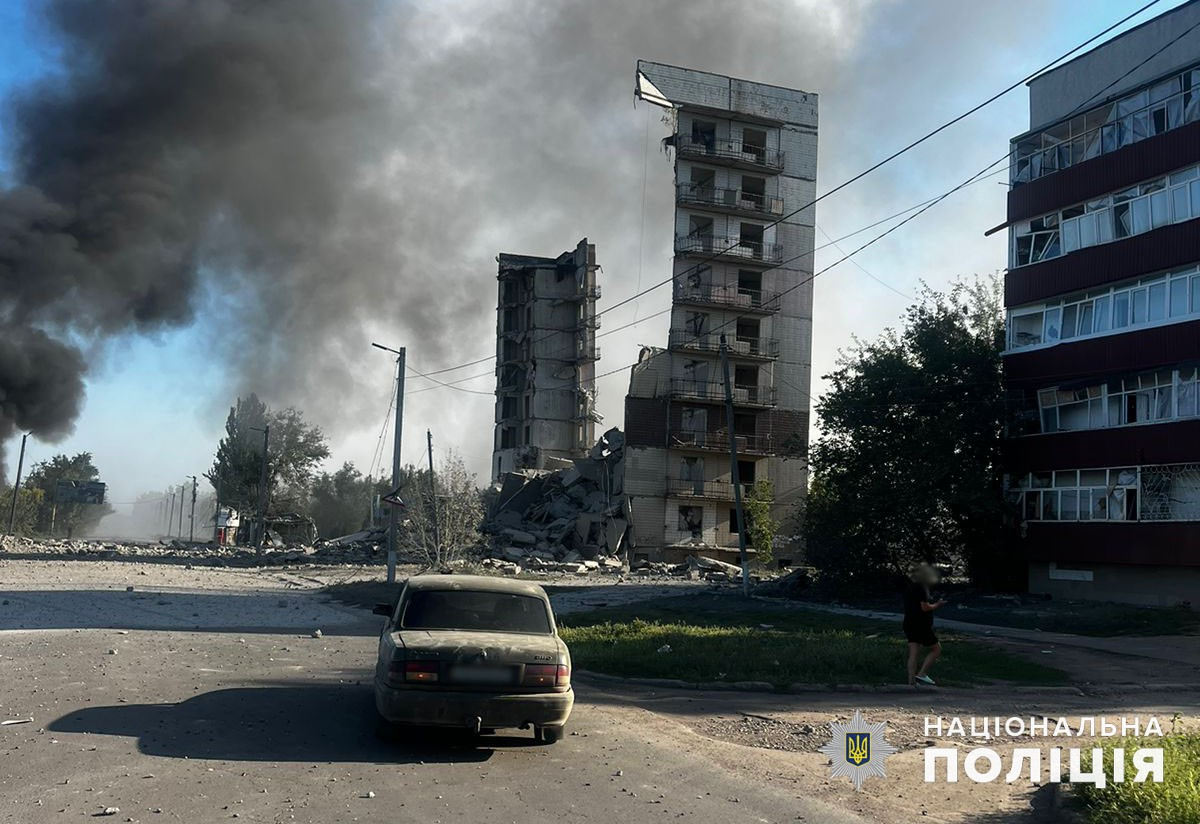
- Myrnohrad, after Russian shelling on 17 August 2024
Date	18 July 2024 – late January 2026 (1 year and 5 or 6 months)
Location	Pokrovsk Raion, Donetsk Oblast, Ukraine
Status	Russian victory
Territorial changes	Russian forces capture the cities of Hirnyk, Krasnohorivka, Kurakhove, Novohrodivka, Selydove, Ukrainsk, Myrnohrad and Pokrovsk

Belligerents
Russia	Ukraine

Units involved
Order of battle	Order of battle

Strength
Per Forbes: ~40,000 soldiers (as of 2 August 2024); Per Kostyantyn Mashovets: 110,000 to 112,000 soldiers (as of 28 July 2025); According to Ukrainian military: 220,000 soldiers (as of August 2025)	Per Forbes: ~12,000 soldiers (as of 2 August 2024)

The Pokrovsk offensive was a military operation in the Russo-Ukrainian war by the Russian Armed Forces with the primary goal of capturing the strategic cities of Pokrovsk and Myrnohrad in western Donetsk Oblast. Fighting increased with the Russian advance into and subsequent capture of Prohres on 18 and 19 July 2024, a turning point for the Russian offensive northwest of Avdiivka following the latter's capture in February 2024, and had taken place in numerous settlements east and south of Pokrovsk in Pokrovsk Raion.

After a protracted military campaign, Russian forces were reported to have captured Pokrovsk and Myrnohrad in early 2026 after entering the former city in November 2025. Despite official Russian claims of opening up new major advances in Donetsk following the cities' capture, Russia was reported to have been unable to capitalize on the seizure of both, not making significant advancements west of Pokrovsk and Myrnohrad since December 2025.

== Background ==
Following the Russian success in the battle of Avdiivka, their forces significantly advanced north and northwest of the city to form a salient in the succeeding months. The success in the battle of Ocheretyne, fought over a settlement northwest of Avdiivka, led to further gains in the months leading up to July 2024.

== Offensive ==
=== Early advances (18–31 July 2024) ===
On 17 July 2024, fighting began over Prohres, a village in central Donetsk Oblast, and Russian forces entered it the following day. On 19 July, Prohres was captured by Russia in an engagement reportedly lasting 48 hours. The breakthrough, reportedly caused by heavy airstrikes which led to the collapse and subsequent retreat of the 110th and 47th Mechanized Brigades, allowed for quick advances along a previously stable frontline. Two days prior, Russian forces had reportedly advanced up to the settlement of Lozuvatske, north of Prohres, and began contesting it. DeepStateMap.Live showed the same day a Russian advance to occupy most of the village; on 20 July, Russian troops began encircling the area between the two villages, and according to some sources, surrounded multiple Ukrainian companies by 24 July, which according to Forbes was "potentially hundreds of Ukrainian soldiers" of two battalions of the 31st Mechanized Brigade. These soldiers, according to David Axe, however managed to escape the encirclement around 26 July with the help of coordinated artillery and drone strikes. Forbes additionally reported that the 47th Brigade lost two M1 Abrams tanks during the engagement around Prohres and that Ukrainian forces had suffered high casualties.

Russian Sukhoi Su-25 shot down by Ukrainian troops near Pokrovsk

On 25 July, Russia began advancing west of Prohres along a railway towards Vesele. This was followed by the capture of Lozuvatske around 26 July, Vovche around 27 July, and Novoselivka Persha, southeast of Prohres, around 29 July. The Russian advances following the capture of Prohres and the "tense and difficult" situation east of Pokrovsk were attributed to a lack of Ukrainian manpower and equipment, deficient training, and decreased morale.

=== Advance towards Hrodivka and Novohrodivka (1–23 August 2024) ===
On 1 August, Russian forces reportedly entered the outskirts of Zhelanne and Ivanivka, and between 1–4 August, captured Vesele. Russian milbloggers also claimed further advances within Ivanivka the same day. Forbes estimated on 2 August that Russia was advancing, where they were reportedly 18 kilometres (11 mi) from Pokrovsk, with "potentially" 40,000 troops composed of 20 Russian regiments and brigades while Ukraine had around 12,000 troops from six brigades. Fighting continued in the sector on 5 and 6 August, and the increased rate of Russian advances, according to Ukrainian Commander-in-Chief Oleksandr Syrskyi, made the front the most active across the frontline by early August as Russia's main offensive goal. Russia reportedly captured Serhiivka on 7 August, and began advancing towards the settlement of Hrodivka, the capture of which would allow for artillery strikes on Pokrovsk itself. On 9 August, the UK Defense Ministry reported that Pokrovsk was only 16 kilometres (9.9 mi) away from the frontline.

Amidst Ukraine's incursion into Russia's Kursk Oblast, fighting near Pokrovsk increased around 13 August, with a reported increase to 52 battles in a day in the area, greater than a third of all engagements across the frontline; a representative of the 110th Mechanized Brigade stated that the situation near Pokrovsk had deteriorated since Ukraine's incursion, attributed to shortages in ammunition and continual Russian offensive efforts. On 13 August, Russia reportedly entered Hrodivka and aligned the frontline with the Kazennyi Torets river in the north, in the process capturing Ivanivka, Lysychne, and Svyrdonivka. A Ukrainian official told Agence France-Presse that the incursion into Kursk had little effect on fighting in the east but that the "intensity of Russian attacks" had decreased slightly over the weekend. A Ukrainian lieutenant corroborated the report of fighting in Hrodivka, and said that "everything is very grim on the Pokrovsk front", while another Ukrainian soldier said that Russian forces were ordered to seize Myrnohrad, a city east of Pokrovsk. On 14 August, Russia continued advancing, seizing Zhelanne, southeast of Hrodivka, and in the direction of Novohrodivka, seizing Orlivka and reportedly entering Mykolaivka and Zhuravka.

Also on 15 August, Serhii Dobriak, the head of the Pokrovsk City Military Administration, reported that Russian forces were only 10 kilometres (6.2 mi) from the city, saying that Russia was "almost right up close to our community", and urged all citizens to evacuate. The same day, a Ukrainian soldier reported that Russian forces had a 10–1 advantage over Ukraine east of Pokrovsk in terms of infantry and were relentlessly conducting assaults on Ukrainian positions throughout the whole day, while the Institute for the Study of War (ISW) stated that Russia was prioritizing advances towards Pokrovsk. On 16 August, American officials reported that Russia had only withdrawn a limited number of units from eastern Ukraine to Kursk Oblast, while Ukrainian soldiers said that Russian attacks in the direction of Pokrovsk had not decreased following the incursion, with Russia choosing to reinforce their forces in the Pokrovsk direction rather than divert them. The same day, a Ukrainian officer reported that Russia was attempting to storm Novohrodivka, while residents of Selydove, Myrnohrad, and Novohrodivka continued to evacuate. On 17 August, Russia reportedly captured Mykolaivka, entered Novozhelanne, and advanced in the fields east of Zhelanne. A high-rise building in Myrnohrad was attacked by Russian shelling. Russian sources further claimed the complete capture of Novozhelanne and advances towards Novohrodivka and in the direction of Krutyi Yar through Zhuravka.

Russian forces moved south of Zhelanne to capture Novozhelanne and Zavitne around 18 August, confirmed by a soldier hoisting the Russian flag on the southern of the two settlements. On 19 August, civilians continued evacuating from Pokrovsk and surrounding settlements, while the city's head Serhii Dobriak announced that families with children would be forced to evacuate Pokrovsk due to continuing Russian advances starting 20 August, and would have at most two weeks to leave, while those in Myrnohrad would have only a few days. Dobriak additionally said that utilities and services would "gradually be winding down" within a week in Pokrovsk. Russia advanced on 18 and 19 August to fully capture Zhuravka and to control all territory east of the Vovcha River in the area, capturing Mezhove and Soniachne in the process. Russia continued to attack Novohrodivka and other settlements east of Pokrovsk; military analyst Franz-Stefan Gady said that Russia was likely "engaging the last proper defensive line outside of the town".

On 21 August, Russian forces advanced further south of Mykolaivka and south of Zhelanne, capturing Komyshivka. President Volodymyr Zelenskyy acknowledged the recent advances made by Russia east of Pokrovsk the same day, and announced that its forces were being bolstered in the area. Russia continued moving south on 22 August to capture Ptyche and advance in the direction of Kalynove, and reportedly gained a foothold in eastern Novohrodivka. The ISW analysed that the recent southern advances were likely due to a Ukrainian withdrawal from positions in the area to avoid encirclement by Russian forces. Services and the administration of Pokrovsk began shutting down or moving out of the city, while civilians continued to evacuate on 22 and 23 August. Russian sources claimed on 23 August that Russia was advancing within southern and southeastern Novohrodivka, had advanced into Krasnyi Yar from the southeast, and that there were reports of a seizure of Kalynove.

=== Capture of Novohrodivka and advance into Selydove (24 August – 6 September 2024) ===
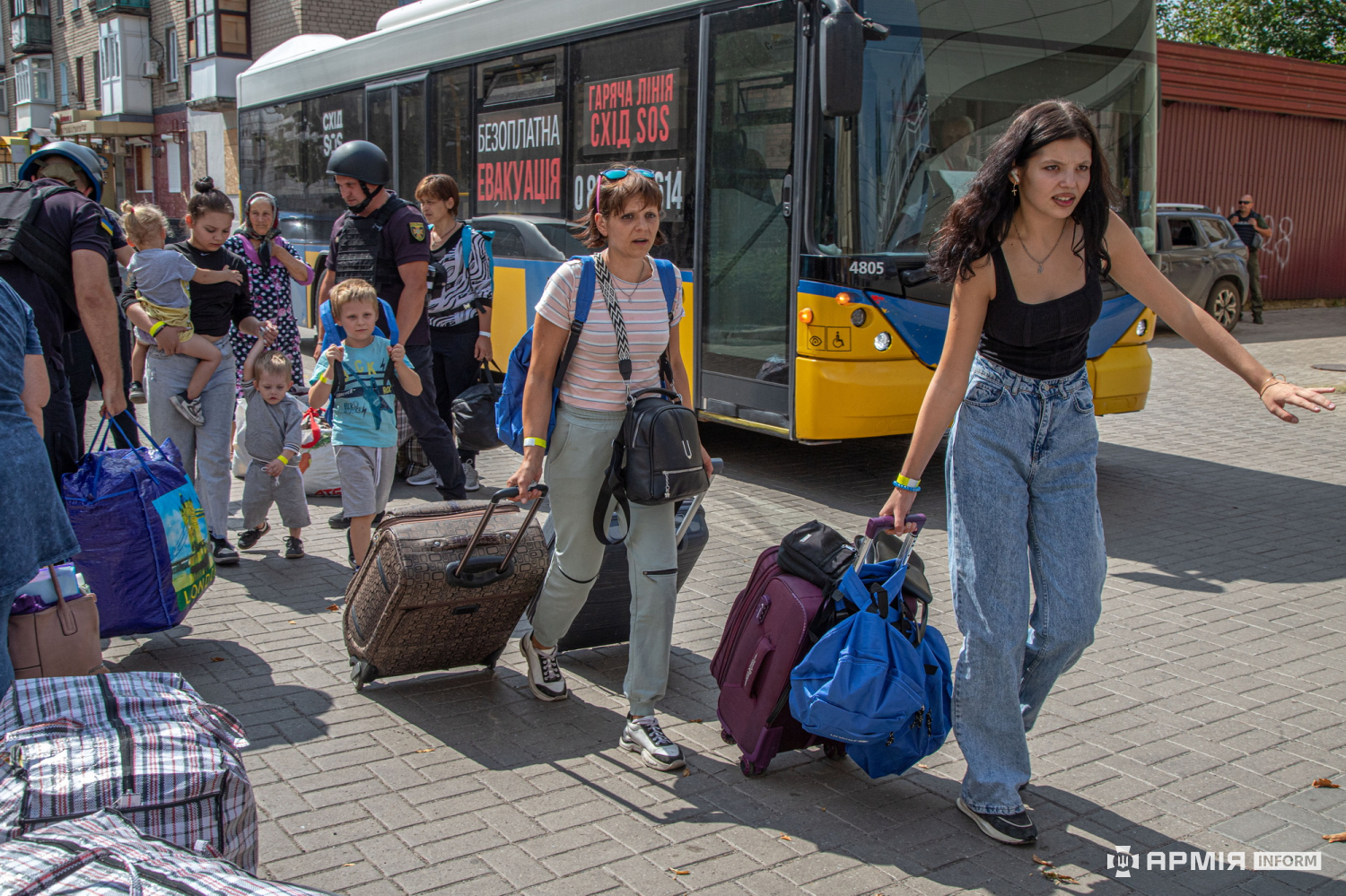
Evacuations from Pokrovsk as a result of advancing Russian forces on 29 August 2024

Russia continued advancing through Novohrodivka on 24 August, capturing most of the eastern portion of the city, while advancing south towards Kalynove, and towards Karlivka from the east. Russian sources claimed the city council building in Novohrodivka had been seized through advances in the central part of the city, and that Krasnyi Yar had been captured, southwest of Hrodivka. Fighting continued for Novohrodivka on 25 August, and Russia reportedly increased their control to more than half of the city. Russian sources claimed further advances south of Novohrodivka towards Marynivka, and towards Kalynove from the north.

Russia continued advancing southwards, southeast of Novohrodivka, on 26 and 27 August; Russian forces entered Mykhailivka, east of Selydove, and advanced into Memryk around 26 August. The following day, Memryk, in addition to Kalynove, was reportedly captured.

By 27 August, Russia had advanced along the railway line passing through Novohrodivka into the city's northwestern outskirts. The ISW assessed that the recent Russian advance through Novohrodivka, taken place in only a few days, was in part due to Ukraine not attempting to maintain defensive positions within the city, where they reportedly had a 4–1 disadvantage in firepower, and instead opting to abandon the settlement. The ISW further said that the advance through Novohrodivka would give Russia a pathway to advance into Pokrovsk. By 28 August, Novohrodivka was widely reported to have been completely captured by Russia, with the Kyiv Post saying that the city had been lost in 72 hours. A prominent Ukrainian journalist expressed disapproval of the lack of promised fortifications in the area and called the situation near Pokrovsk "catastrophic". Russian sources also claimed on 28 August that further advances within Hrodivka had been made, with the claimed advance being up to the Zhuravka River dividing the settlement, and that Myrnohrad's southern outskirts had been reached via advances north through Krasnyi Yar.

The same day, Russia reportedly advanced into Selydove following a Ukrainian withdrawal from certain positions in the city, entering the eastern part of the city, likely through further advances within Mykhaikivka.

The ISW assessed on 29 August that Russia was simultaneously pursuing two offensives near Pokrovsk: towards Pokrovsk itself, where Russia was attacking the defensive line from Hrodivka to Novohrodivka, and south towards the defensive line running from Ukrainsk–Hirnyk–Selydove. They assessed that the former effort sought to first capture Myrnohrad and then advance into Pokrovsk's outskirts, while the latter to expand the salient east of Pokrovsk and to lessen opportunities for a Ukrainian counterattack at the base of the 21 kilometer wide Russian salient towards Avdiivka, and that these were both likely seen as necessary objectives by Russia to achieve prior to launching an attack on Pokrovsk itself. The second effort would supposedly hope to further eliminate the Ukrainian salient north of Krasnohorivka and capture the fields north of it, assisting in the hostilities taking place south of the Ukrainian salient.

Russian sources on 29 August claimed that engagements were taking place in northeastern Ukrainsk and southern Myrnohrad, while a Ukrainian analyst stated that the presence of Russian forces in Myrnohrad was rather only for sabotage and reconnaissance purposes. Selydove's center was claimed to have been reached by Russian forces.

On 30 August, Russia captured the village of Karlivka, making further advances south of it, while Russian sources claimed a complete capture of Hrodivka. On 31 August Russia advanced into Halytsynivka and seized the northern portion of the village. Russian milbloggers claimed that the village had been completely captured, which was later confirmed on 3 September. Russian forces likely captured Mykhailivka and Dolynivka on 1 September. Civilians continued evacuating from Pokrovsk, while most of the city's businesses and infrastructure finished closing, such as hospitals and supermarkets, their contents being transported away from the frontline.

By 2 September, elements of the 59th Motorized Infantry Brigade, 68th Jager Brigade, 117th Territorial Defense Brigade and 15th National Guard Brigade were in danger of being cut off and encircled in the Ukrainian salient southeast of Pokrovsk, east of the Vovcha River and north of Krasnohorivka. The integrity of the 78 square kilometres (30 sq mi) salient reportedly rested on the 25th Airborne Brigade, defending Ukrainsk. On 3 September, Russian sources claimed that Russia had begun advancing in this salient, west of Nevelske. On 5 September, civilians remaining in Pokrovsk were asked to switch to using the train station of Pavlohrad for evacuation, with buses to the city being provided, as the Pokrovsk railway station was forced to close as it experienced a worsening security situation. According to Donetsk Oblast governor Vadym Filashkin, 26,000 people remained in Pokrovsk.

On 5 September, the ISW assessed that the recent expansion of the Pokrovsk salient southwards aimed to act in tandem with the renewed offensive towards Vuhledar in western Donetsk Oblast, with the former effort of seizing Pokrovsk continuing to serve as the priority, and the latter aimed at limiting the amount of Ukraininan redeployments to the Pokrovsk sector. Russian efforts continued to envelop and encircle the Ukrainian salient west of Donetsk, with The New York Times saying it had been "nearly encircled" by Russian forces.

=== Fighting for Ukrainsk and shift in movement south (7–20 September 2024) ===
By 7 September, Russian success northwest directly towards Pokrovsk had largely stalled, while advances continued in the southern direction, southeast of Pokrovsk. Ukrainian brigades newly deployed to the area made multiple counterattacks: in Selydove, a city crucial to further Russian offensive success where momentum had stalled, in Halytsynivka, and in Mykhailivka.

Russia continued exerting pressure in the southern direction towards Ukrainsk and Hirnyk, with the former reportedly being entered. The ISW analysed that a capture of these two cities would allow for the southern advances in the Pokrovsk salient to evolve into an attack on Kurakhove further south, a key city in the region, and that this axis of advance exists as a prerequisite of directly assaulting Pokrovsk, efforts that mutually reinforce each other. A Russian source said that gaining control of the elevated areas near Ukrainsk and Hirnyk was being focused on rather than a full frontal assault on Ukrainsk. Visual confirmation was given on 7 September for a Russian advance to central Hrodivka, while Russian milbloggers claimed that Lisivka, east of Ukrainsk, had been captured, visually confirmed four days later.

On 10 September, the ISW assessed that footage showing a Russian advance near Marynivka indicated it had been captured. On 12 September, Russian sources claimed an advance towards Pokrovsk via a separate Lisivka, saying the village had been captured.

Fighting continued east of Selydove, where the frontline was reportedly situated between the city's eastern outskirts and Mykhailivka following the reported Ukrainian counterattack in early September. Russian media claimed that an attempt to encircle Selydove was ongoing, but this was not deemed possible based on the current frontline by the ISW. Both Russia and Ukraine made marginal advances near Selydove, northeast of the city and west of Mykhailivka, and a Ukrainian military observer confirmed Russian advances east and northeast of Selydove. Russian forces reportedly shifted their tactics near Selydove away from frontal assaults to employing small groups moving through covered areas. Russian sources claimed advances within Selydove itself, while a Ukrainian officer contrastingly said that the city was "completely under our control".

In Pokrovsk, the population continued to decrease as residents fled, reaching 18,000 by 11 September. Russian forces had meanwhile cut water supplies to the city, blown up multiple bridges near and in Pokrovsk, severing connections to highways in the city, and were able to strike Ukrainian soldiers with drones and artillery. According to a Ukrainian unit commander, this hampered logistical supply to the city and meant that Pokrovsk "can already said to have been lost" in terms of its logistical prowess. Ukrainian forces were reportedly fortifying the city in preparation for urban combat.

In Ukrainsk, Russian forces seized control over southern parts of the city by 11 September, while making confirmed advances on the city's northwestern flank by 13 September. The ISW stated that the footage confirming this latter advance meant that Ukrainsk "may have" been captured, while also assessing that these attacks on the city's flanks were being preferred over a direct frontal assault as encirclement efforts continued. Later footage on 17 September confirmed the complete capture of Ukrainsk, widely amplified by Russian media. Following this, Russian forces reportedly began advancing south towards Hirnyk and northwest of Ukrainsk. The New York Times assessed that the capture of Ukrainsk could assist in the advance south towards Kurakhove.

=== Semi-encirclement and capture of Selydove (21 September – 30 October 2024) ===
West of Ukrainsk, Russian forces continued advancing, reaching the railway line north of the settlement of Tsukuryne and south of Selydove, a city vital for the defence of Pokrovsk. Further advances towards this line were made in late September, coinciding with an advance along the Donetsk–Pokrovsk highway to the north of Selydove, in what the ISW stated was an effort by Russian forces to bypass the city altogether. Russian sources said that these movements were aimed at encircling Selydove, in a similar way to the then ongoing advances near Vuhledar. Footage on 30 September showed that Tsukuryne had been entered in the southeast, while a Ukrainian officer stated that the settlement had shifted to become a priority target for Russian forces in the area.

Near Myrnohrad, Russian forces seized Krutyi Yar in late September, and on 10 October, captured Krasnyi Yar and seized Mykolaivka, the last settlement before the city. The head of Pokrovsk's administration stated on 4 October that four fifths of the city's critical infrastructure had been destroyed from Russian attacks, and that its remaining inhabitants had been left without water, power, and gas.

Tsukuryne was reported to have been captured on 6 October. Russian forces made continual advances east of Selydove in mid-October, and a Ukrainian soldier said on 16 October that efforts were being made to both enter the outskirts of Selydove itself and to bypass the city. A Russian source said that two of five roads running to Selydove had been cut off, and that a third, running from Selydove to Novodmytrivka, was being approached. On 18 October, the road was reportedly severed through further advances south of the city along the rail line. Russia's focus on capturing Selydove inhibited further advances elsewhere in the sector, specifically on Pokrovsk directly.

A Ukrainian military expert on 19 October said that Russian forces aimed to bypass the local slag heaps in Selydove and force a Ukrainian retreat by continuing their encirclement efforts, and that the capture of these would allow for fire control over the surroundings of Pokrovsk. On 20 October, Russian milbloggers said that intense street by street fighting was taking place between Russian and Ukrainian forces on the outskirts of the city. A Ukrainian military observer confirmed that Hrodivka had been captured on 21 October.

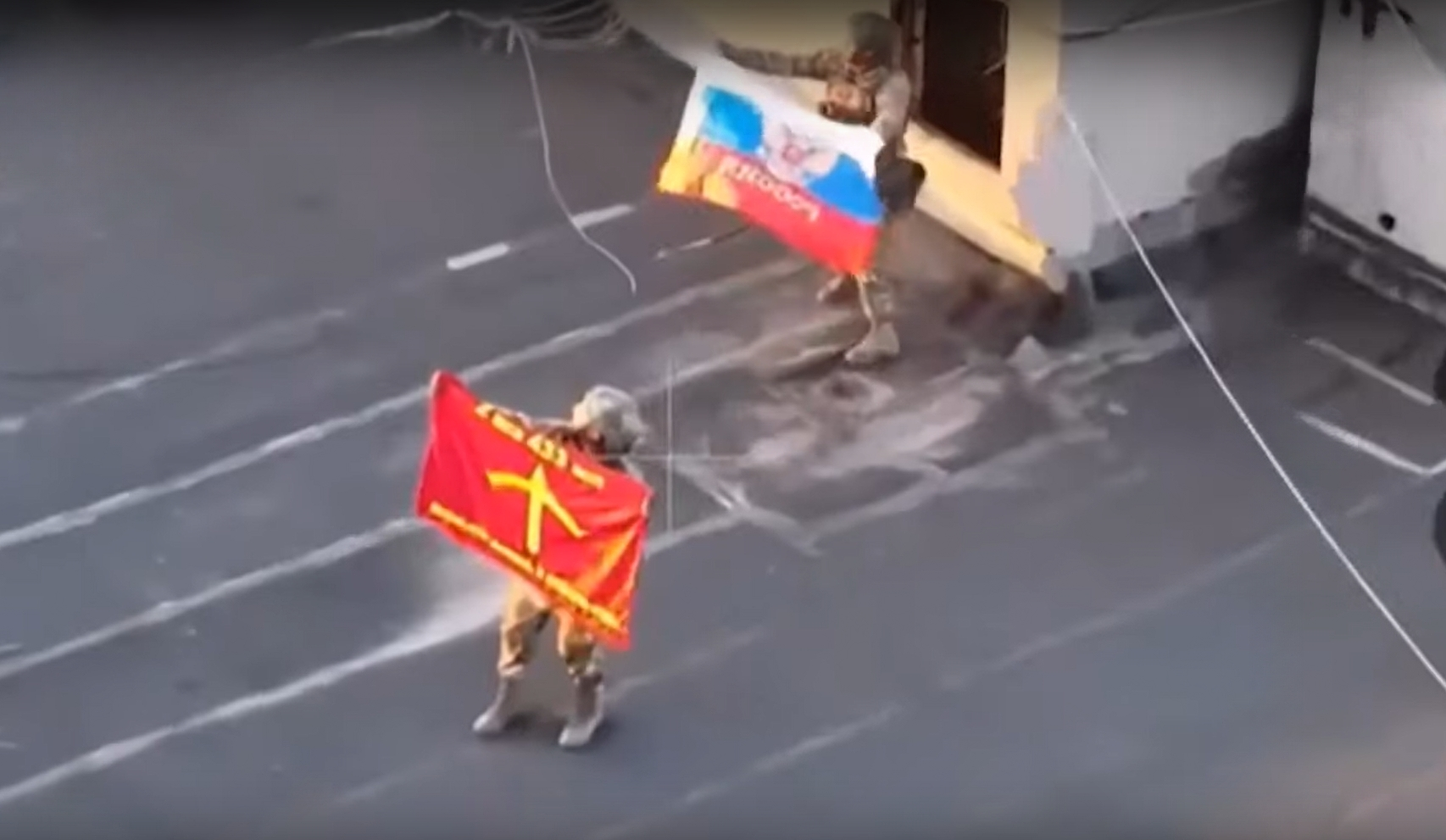
Russian soldiers in Selydove, late October 2024

On 22 October, the commander of the Aidar's 24th Separate Assault Brigade, Stanyslav Bunyatov, stated that half of the city was captured by Russian forces, citing lack of manpower as an issue. The next day, this was confirmed by DeepStateMap.Live. Russian forces were able to hoist their flag in the central part of Selydove, with the ISW stating that Russia had made "significant tactical advances" both in and around the city. The Ukrainian military said that the city was "on the verge" of being seized. Russian forces also advanced to the outskirts of the village of Vyshneve in late October, further deteriorating Ukrainian control over the supply lines to the city. Russia was able to nearly encircle Selydove, with most roads cut off or under fire control.

By 27 October, DeepStateMap.Live showed that Russian forces had advanced and occupied most of the city, with the north-western outskirts remaining disputed territory. Russian sources claimed the same day that the entire city had been captured, with Russian MOD claiming capture on 29 October. Selydove was confirmed captured on 30 October by DeepStateMap.

=== Turning maneuver from the southwest towards Pokrovsk (November 2024 – January 2025) ===
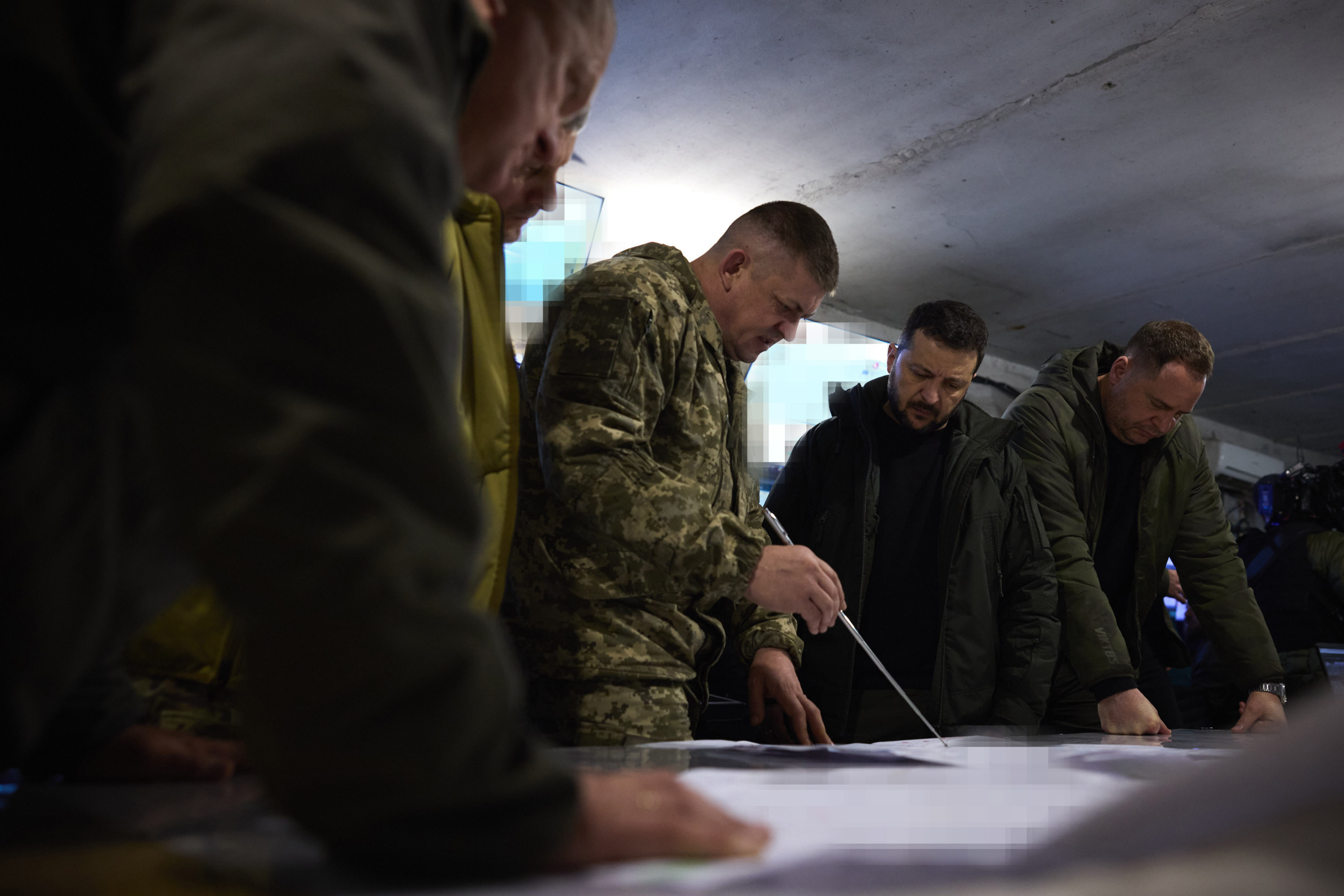
President of Ukraine Volodymyr Zelenskyy visiting troops of the 25th airborne brigade in Pokrovsk on 18 November 2024

In early December 2024, the village of Shevchenko to the southwest of Pokrovsk came under high pressure by Russian forces, as they sought to advance on the western flank of Pokrovsk to seize the city with a turning maneuver from the south, parallel to advances east of Myrnohrad.

By 12 December, Russian forces had advanced within a range of 3 kilometres to the southern city limits of Pokrovsk, after swift advances in Shevchenko. As a result of these advances, Ukraine's largest steel producer Metinvest started suspending operations at an administrative building and one of three of its mining sites at the Pokrovsk coal mine. The company justified this action with the closer-moving frontline and intensified shelling. Core personnel were evacuated along with their families, with further decision-making depending on the evolution of the nearby fighting. On 15 December, pro-Ukrainian sources confirmed that Shevchenko had been fully captured by Russian forces.

Russia also launched attacks on the left flank to Vozdvyzhenka on 28 December, capturing the settlement on 2 January, then slowly advancing towards Baranivka and the H-32 highway interchange throughout January. On 13 January 2025, Reuters reported, citing unnamed industry sources, that the Pokrovske coal mine, Ukraine's sole controlled coking coal-producing facility, had halted production due to the approaching front line. The same day, geolocated footage showed that Russian forces had captured the village of Pishchane, south of Pokrovsk, and severed two highways leading east (H-32 to Kostiantynivka) and west (to Mezhova) out of Pokrovsk.

By early February, Russian troops were less than 2 km (1.2 mi) from Pokrovsk. Their occupation of dominant heights near the city put Ukrainian supply routes within their range. Ukrainian drone operations were hampered by heavy fog, and inexperience of new recruits put severe strain on their comrades, whose zones of responsibility effectively widened.

=== Stalemate and local counter-attacks (February – March 2025) ===
While the Russians advanced south and south-west of Pokrovsk, advance towards the city itself halted around a perimeter. Russians did not advance past Hrodivka and Mykolaivka, and by the end of January, the front line stabilized on an arc from Mykolaivka through Lysivka, Shevchenko, Pishchane to Kotlyne. After the capture of Kotlyne in late January, Russian advance to encircle Pokrovsk from the west also halted, leaving a salient south-west of the city.

From February, Ukraine conducted multiple local counter-attacks from all sides of the salient. By mid-February Ukrainians gained ground in Pischane and Lysivka. Ukrainian paratroopers recaptured Kotlyne on 26 February. Ukrainians also attacked Russians at Uspenivka by 5 March.

=== Opening of the eastern flank and advance towards Rodynske (April – August 2025) ===
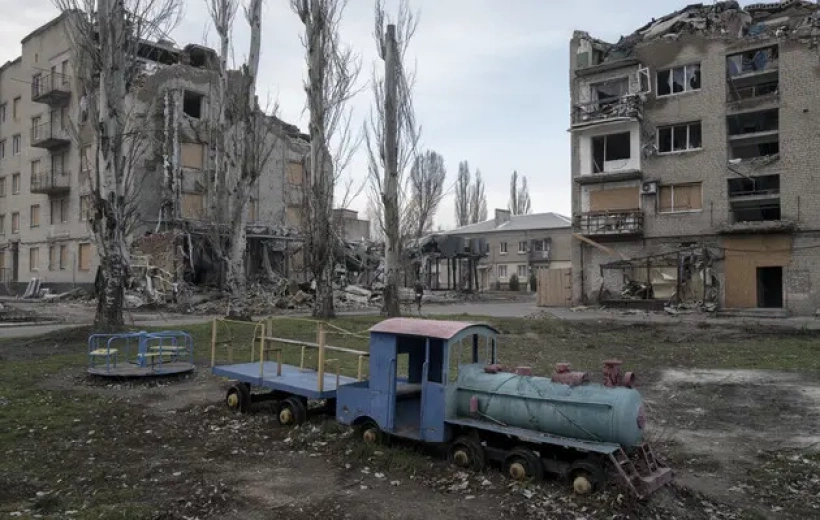
Pokrovsk on 8 January 2025

At the beginning of April, the Russian army renewed their offensive operations near Pokrovsk. This time they attacked from Vozdvyzhenka, which is located to the east of Pokrovsk, northwards where they advanced towards the strategic H-32 Pokrovsk – Kostiantynivka (T-0405) highway. In May, Russian troops continued expanding the salient northeast of Pokrovsk by crossing the H-32 highway and seizing the settlements of Myroliubivka, Mykhailivka and Yelyzavetivka. Furthermore, Russian forces advanced into Malynivka.

By mid-June, Russian units captured the settlement of Shevchenko Pershe, north of Malynivka. The following week, geolocated footage showed Ukrainian drone strikes on Russian positions in western Malynivka, noting Russian control over the village. At the end of the month, Russian troops seized the village of Koptieve, west of Shevchenko Pershe.

In early July, Russian forces advanced from Myroliubivka into the southern parts of Novoekonomichne. On 12 July, Russians were able to capture Razine. Additional advances by Russian assault groups were made from Razine westwards into Fedorivka and inside Novoekonomichne by mid-July. On 22 July, Russian sabotage and reconnaissance groups were reported to have entered the southern areas of the city. Ukrainska Pravda reported that the first groups were spotted in Pokrovsk as early as on 17 July, inflicting casualties and causing friendly fire incidents. According to DeepState, the Russians were able to slip through because of unreliable battlefield assessments and because one of the brigades defending Pokrovsk "had run out of infantry". The Kyiv Independent noted that over 1,300 residents still remained in the city amidst the offensive. The Russian army took full control of the urban settlement of Novoekonomichne by 24 July.

According to The Daily Telegraph, Russian forces took control of the city of Rodynske on 27 July, cutting one of the main supply routes to Pokrovsk, but it was not reflected on OSINT maps. The next day, Ukrainian military analyst Kostyantyn Mashovets claimed that the Russians had amassed 110,000–112,000 troops in the Pokrovsk direction, supported by 500–520 tanks, 680–700 AFVs, up to 560–565 tube artillery pieces (including 120-mm mortars), and more than 180 MLRS. He also claimed that Russia's Central Grouping of Forces was their strongest formation. Active fighting in the eastern outskirts of Rodynske was reported by the end of the month. Geolocated footage of 30 July indicated that the Russian forces advanced into central Pokrovsk. However, the advance was reported to be for reconnaissance and sabotage purposes. Based on additional footage, the ISW assessed on 8 August that Russian saboteur units advanced into eastern and central Pokrovsk.

According to DeepState, the Russians formed three tactical groups, each numbering around 50 men, to infiltrate the city. It reportedly took them 10 days to reach Pokrovsk from the village of Pischane, advancing about 600 meters a day to avoid detection. Supplies were delivered via drones, and the groups were well coordinated and aware of each other's positions. DeepState claimed that out of 150 troops only 30 made it to the city, while the rest were killed by drone-dropped munitions. As of 10 August, a mop-up operation was still ongoing.

With this development of events, if it does not change, we may encounter a situation where Dobropillia falls faster than Pokrovsk.

— DeepStateMap.Live, in a report the day the major assault began

On 11 August 2025, a major ground assault was launched by Russian forces northeast of Pokrovsk and Rodynske in the direction of Dobropillia, with heavy clashes reported along multiple points of the front line. The OSINT map DeepStateMap.Live reported the "situation remains chaotic" with "Russian forces quickly establish[ing] positions [to] accumulate troops for further advances". Left unchecked, DeepState reported the assault placed the city of Pokrovsk in greater threat of encirclement. Despite both DeepState and Ukrainian National News reporting that Russian forces were suffering heavy casualties in their advance, Russian numerical advantages and Ukrainian infantry shortages at this part of the frontline allowed the assault to remain successful, and further makes it unlikely for Ukrainians to cut off and encircle the advancing Russian units. Diplomatically, Ukrainian President Zelenskyy stated the timing of the offensive was likely arranged to precede the upcoming 2025 Russia–United States Summit to place Russia at a better position in peace negotiations.

On 12 August, geolocated footage indicated that Russian forces had advanced in the eastern part of Rodynske. On the same day Meduza reported that Russian forces had yet to establish a foothold or consolidate its gains north of Pokrovsk, and that some analysts said "it's unlikely the current push will develop into an operational-level breakthrough anytime soon." The Ukrainian 7th Air Assault Corps stated that they had fully cleared central Pokrovsk of Russian infiltrators by 15 August. By 25 August 2025, the limited Russian positions in Pokrovsk were cleared, and the Russians were pushed back to Leontovychi.

=== Infiltrations and storming of southern Pokrovsk (1 September – 25 October 2025) ===
In September 2025, Russian forces continued infiltrating Pokrovsk from the south, sending small groups of soldiers into the city. Geolocated footage of 17 September showed Russian troops taking up a position along Kvitkova Street in southern Pokrovsk, indicating that their forces seized the village of Troyanda. One week later, Russian forces advanced into the settlement of Novopavlivka, located southeast of Pokrovsk. In early October, Russia advanced in the Zelenivka district of southern Pokrovsk. A local Ukrainian commander reported that the Ukrainian army is engaging the Russian groups inside the city and that fighting is ongoing both "on the ground and in the sky". The Russian Defence Ministry announced on 14 October that their forces seized the settlement of Balahan east of Myrnohrad. The next week, a Russian infiltration unit managed to penetrate into central Pokrovsk, reaching the building of the railway station. According to the Ukrainian 7th Air Assault Corps, the Russian group was eliminated shortly after entering the building. The Telegraph reported apparent video evidence of Russian war crimes, showing the dead bodies of three civilians who, according to the corps, had been killed by the same group of Russian infiltrators. The footage also captured a man rescuing a woman who had been apparently shot in the legs. She was reportedly unable to be evacuated due to the large number of Russian FPV drones.

Ukrainska Pravda reported on 24 October that the situation in Pokrovsk had deteriorated to a critical point. According to Ukrainian officers operating in the area, the Russian forces that had been pushed out of the city managed to re-enter it around mid-August and establish staging areas in and around the settlement. It was reported that, at the time of publication, there were at least 250 Russian troops engaging Ukrainian soldiers within Pokrovsk. Other reported issues included Russian fiber optic drones controlling logistics routes, a shortage of infantry, and poor communications with Ukrainian positions, some of which have been reported as existing only on maps or being located between Russian lines. One of the officers also said that Russian soldiers have been spotted in northern and southern Myrnohrad.

=== Advances into central Pokrovsk (26 October – 29 December 2025) ===
Military situation around Pokrovsk, as of 21 December 2025

By 26 October, the Ukrainian military acknowledged that a few hundred Russian troops had entered the city of Pokrovsk. As the fighting expanded within the city, Ukraine deployed additional reinforcements to this sector. Russian Chief of the General Staff Valery Gerasimov claimed that thousands of Ukrainian soldiers were encircled near Pokrovsk, something both military experts and Russian pro-war bloggers disputed. Ukrainian President Zelenskyy described the situation in Pokrovsk as "difficult", but rejected Gerasimov's reports that Ukrainian forces were surrounded. Intense street fighting took place by the end of October as Russian forces were advancing into the city center. The Ukrainian 7th Air Assault Corps estimated that Russia deployed around 11,000 troops in the area. A Russian unit managed to reach the most western edge of Pokrovsk and planted a Russian flag on the Pokrovsk entrance sign along the M30 highway, which was later destroyed by a Ukrainian drone.

In an effort to combat the Russian advances in western Pokrovsk, Ukrainian special forces under the command of the Ukrainian military intelligence agency (HUR) conducted a landing operation from a Black Hawk helicopter. Zelenskyy stated that Ukrainian troops were outnumbered 8-to-1 around Pokrovsk. He also said that Russia had amassed 170,000 troops in the eastern Donetsk region committed to the offensive on Pokrovsk. A Ukrainian officer told Hromadske that about 60% of the city is under Russian control. He added that Russia has almost complete fire control over the final supply route towards Myrnohrad. By 6 November, a Ukrainian commander said that Russian forces were trying to infiltrate further into northern Pokrovsk. The Russian Defence Ministry reported that its forces were fighting house-to-house battles inside Pokrovsk to expel Ukrainian forces. As a result of over a year of fighting, the city had been severely damaged. Pokrovsk was described by The New York Times as having ‘been turned largely into rubble.’ Geolocated footage published on 7 November indicated that Russian forces were advancing south of Krasnyi Lyman.

The Russian pressure from two sides on the remaining supply line toward Myrnohrad makes it dangerous for the Ukrainian army to resupply its forces. In addition, it threatens Ukraine's ability to withdraw their troops. One Ukrainian soldier told CNN that no order to withdraw had been made as of 8 November. Under the cover of thick fog, the Russian army began reinforcing its troops in Pokrovsk from the south. A video released on 10 November showed Russian soldiers entering the city with motorcycles and civilian vehicles. Reuters verified that the video was recorded at the southern entrance of Pokrovsk along the M-30 highway. According to the Ukrainian 68th brigade, the convoy was partially destroyed. North of Pokrovsk, Russian units infiltrated the farms located on the northern outskirts of the city, in an attempt to complete the encirclement of Ukrainian forces in Myrnohrad. According to the Ukrainian 7th Air Assault Corps, these Russian groups were destroyed.

On 1 December, Russia announced the full capture of Pokrovsk. A video released by the Russian Defence Ministry shows Russian troops holding a flag on a square in the city center. The next day, the Ukrainian General Staff denied the Russian claims, stating that its forces are still holding the northern parts of Pokrovsk. On the same day, a high-ranking NATO official told journalists in Brussels that more than 95% of the city had been taken by Russia. On 11 December, several media outlets reported on footage of Ukrainian soldiers disputing the Russian claim of a full capture by raising their flag in Pokrovsk, with Ukraine still claiming to hold positions in the northern part of the city.

On 24 December, independent Ukrainian press claimed that battle of Pokrovsk was ending with Russians consolidating and controlling most of the ruins of Pokrovsk and Myrnohrad while fighting was shifting to the north of the towns. Meanwhile, Ukraine insisted that it still holds positions in northern Pokrovsk which are often intermixed with Russian positions in the same streets.

=== Advances into northern Pokrovsk and Myrnohrad and Russian capture (January 2026) ===
As of 14 January 2026, the Defense Forces of Ukraine were holding positions in northern Pokrovsk, according to Ukraine's Skhid (East) operational command.

On 4 February, ISW reported that Russian forces had seemingly captured Myrnohrad on a date prior to 28 January, when Ukrainska Pravda reported that Russian forces had begun moving command posts into the city.

On 25 February, ISW reported that it had not observed evidence of Ukrainian forces in Pokrovsk since 28 January, indicating that Russia had fully captured Pokrovsk.

== Casualties ==
=== Russia ===
On 27 August 2024, Syrskyi claimed that, on average, his soldiers "neutralize" 300 Russian soldiers every day in the Pokrovsk direction.

On 2 September, David Axe estimated that the Russians had suffered casualties of "potentially tens of thousands of soldiers" while advancing towards Pokrovsk following the capture of Avdiivka in February 2024.

In an interview with Times Radio on 5 September, British defence analyst Michael Clarke estimated that the Russians were losing 1,000 men killed or wounded per day on average during the Pokrovsk offensive, and had also lost "well over" 100 armored vehicles over the past week alone.

Two Russian assaults on 12 and 19 September, carried out with a total of 98 vehicles, were claimed by the Ukrainian 46th Air Mobile Brigade to have been repulsed in a week defending Kurakhove. They claimed to have damaged or destroyed 44 of the attacking vehicles.

On 19 September, Ukrainian analyst Petro Chernyk claimed that fighting near Pokrovsk had resulted in the "pre-emptive extermination of 2–3 thousand enemy personnel".

On 11 December, the ISW reported that a Ukrainian brigade officer claimed that Russian forces lost nearly 3,000 personnel in the Pokrovsk direction in two weeks.

On 5 January 2025, the ISW reported that a Ukrainian intelligence officer operating in the Pokrovsk direction claimed that Russian forces are suffering up to 400 personnel casualties per day.

On 2 February 2025, Ukrainian C-in-C Oleksandr Syrski claimed that Russian forces had suffered 15,000 casualties, including 7,000 killed in action, in the Pokrovsk direction in January 2025 alone. Meanwhile, the ISW reported a higher figure of roughly 21,000 Russian casualties, based on President Zelenskyy's claim that Russian forces suffer a 2:1 wounded to killed ratio.

Similarly, Ukraine's Khortytsia Group of Forces Spokesperson, Major Viktor Trehubov, claimed that Russian forces were suffering 14,000 to 15,000 casualties, including 7,000 killed in action, per month in the Pokrovsk direction, suggesting 45,000 Russian casualties in the first three months of 2025.

On 17 August 2025, the Ukrainians claimed to have killed 910 Russian troops, wounded 335 and captured 37 between 4 and 16 August. (Note: Equipment losses were claimed at eight Russian tanks, six armored fighting vehicles, more than 100 vehicles and motorcycles, one multiple launch rocket system, 18 artillery pieces, and 91 drones destroyed or damaged.) Three days later, the Ukrainians claimed to have killed an additional 206 Russian soldiers, wounded 73 and captured one in the same sector. (Note: Equipment losses were claimed to be three tanks, three AFVs, 24 vehicles, 12 artillery pieces and 35 UAVs.)

On 11 December 2025, The Telegraph reported that an entire Russian convoy had been destroyed during a Ukrainian counter-attack in the city.

On 26 February 2026, US Navy veteran and military analyst Chuck Pfarrer estimated that Russian casualties had exceeded 250,000 in the vicinity of Pokrovsk, "representing nearly 20% of all Russian forces lost since the invasion began". He also said that 20,000 transport vehicles had been destroyed, forcing the Russians to use donkeys to move munitions to the front.

=== Ukraine ===
The 47th Mechanized Brigade operating in the Pokrovsk direction by late August 2024 had reportedly lost around half of the M1 Abrams tanks it had been supplied with.

A Ukrainian military correspondent said that after fighting off heavy Russian attacks for days, the 11th Separate Motorized Infantry Battalion lost artillery support due to Russians closing in from the north, and after six days of intense fighting, the battalion was forced to withdraw from the village of Karlivka as pressures on logistics and losses mounted. After escaping encirclement, the battalion's commander was sacked on 26 August 2024.

According to the commanding officer of the 68th Jaeger Brigade, the brigade had suffered "a lot of losses" during the defense of Novohrodivka in September 2024.

According to a report from DeepState dated 22 July 2025, one of the Ukrainian brigades defending Pokrovsk "had run out of infantry".

== Analysis ==
=== Strategic value ===
Pokrovsk has been described as a strategically significant city due to its role as a supply hub; it stands at the intersection of multiple supply highways, one of which leads towards key inwards cities in Donetsk Oblast, including Chasiv Yar and Kostiantynivka, and houses a regionally significant railway station. If captured by Russia, Pokrovsk would be the most populous settlement seized since Bakhmut in 2023. Due to its strategic positioning, such a capture would allow for advances towards Dnipro and Zaporizhzhia.

Ukrainian military expert Mykhaylo Zhyrokhov said that Pokrovsk's position as a "very important hub" and a "centre of defence" means that "the entire frontline will crumble" if the city is captured by Russia, while the BBC noted that the aftermath of the city's fall, such as a Ukrainian retreat from Chasiv Yar, "would effectively mean the loss of almost the entire Donetsk region". Analyst Markus Reisner reported that Pokrovsk was the last fortified position of three defensive lines built by Ukraine since 2014, and its loss would mean that Russia will only face open land and loose fortified positions.

Zelenskyy also compared the battle to the Battle of Bakhmut, saying that "this is an unconditional decision of the military, who should be in the Pokrovsky direction, in what number, etc. But you have to understand: they are not retreating there. Returning back, they are shot. I am talking about the Russian army. And they will press. It is necessary for them. Like the situation with Bakhmut. They will put 50–60 thousand people there. You will see it. You will understand these numbers very soon."

Pokrovsk also has central importance for the Ukrainian steel industry. Pischane is the largest plant for coking coal production in Ukraine. The site provided half of Metinvest's coal volume, used to produce steel at the company's plants. Loss of the Pokrovsk coal mine would thus be a major blow to Ukraine's steel production industry. According to the head of Ukraine's steelmakers' association, Oleksandr Kalenkov, a full closure of the plant could diminish Ukrainian steel production to only 2–3 million metric tons, down from a projected 7.5 million by the end of 2024.

In November 2025, author and former British and Ukrainian soldier Shaun Pinner, writing for the Center for European Policy Analysis compared the battle of Pokrovsk to the Waterloo campaign. He said a Ukrainian loss of the city would be a hit to morale, and give Russia a "propaganda moment". According to Pinner, the Ukrainian tactic of making Russia "bleed for ground" had been effective in Pokrovsk, similarly to in Mariupol and Bakhmut. Pinner stressed the importance of Pokrovsk from a Russian propaganda standpoint, saying that Putin "needs a trophy" to support a narrative of progress before winter.

=== Tactics and battlefield challenges ===
Russian advances towards Pokrovsk were partially attributed, in August 2024, by Ukrainian commanders and soldiers to issues with new Ukrainian conscripts; these newly mobilised soldiers reportedly had little to no training, were often incapable of effectively shooting a target, were overly-hasty in retreating from positions, and sometimes fled an area of staging battlefield operations out of a lack of trust for the plans.

An Azov Brigade officer said in August 2024 that many soldiers serving in the Pokrovsk direction are there against their will, and that the discipline, morale, and exhaustion problems with these and other soldiers are a contributor to the situation which he described as "out of control".

According to reports from August 2024, Russian forces typically attack and perform operations with small infantry groups, where they are relatively effective at advancing through villages and are harder for Ukrainian drones to target.

On 13 August 2025, The Telegraph reported that Russian soldiers were disguising themselves as civilians as a tactic to infiltrate Pokrovsk.

In September 2025, The Telegraph reported that, according to the Ukrainian Security and Cooperation Centre, Russian units made up of soldiers infected with HIV, hepatitis and other diseases had been spotted around Pokrovsk. Former British Army Colonel and chemical weapons expert Hamish de Bretton-Gordon said that the deployment of these soldiers was "proof of Putin's desperation to capture Pokrovsk", while the Ukrainian Security and Cooperation Centre said that their presence can "exert a certain moral and psychological pressure due to close contact with such an enemy".

In January 2026, the Center for Strategic and International Studies assessed that Russia's advance in Pokrovsk had been slower than the Allied forces during the battle of the Somme, known as one of the most grinding offensives of World War I.

In February 2026, ISW said that Russia had been unable to capitalize on the seizure of Pokrovsk and make further operationally significant advances, having been unable to make significant advancements west of Pokrovsk since December 2025, refuting Kremlin claims of "opening up" major advances to take the rest of Donetsk Oblast.

==== Deterioration of Ukrainian brigades deployed near Pokrovsk ====
In November 2024, the French-trained 155th Mechanized Brigade was deployed south of Pokrovsk to help hold positions in the area, including the settlement of Shevchenko. The brigade reportedly suffered heavy losses during its first few days of combat. According to an article published on 31 December 2024 by Ukrainian journalist Yurii Butusov, the brigade had suffered from serious organisational problems since its inception. Operational Command West, responsible for the formation of the brigade, lacked the resources, manpower and command staff needed to create a new unit. By the time the brigade was sent to France for training in October, 935 soldiers had already gone AWOL and 50 more had deserted in France. While the brigade command was in France, 700 more newly recruited men stationed in Ukraine went AWOL without ever seeing their commander. Butusov first brought attention to the problems with the brigade in a report on 14 December, where he stated that over a thousand servicemen of the brigade went AWOL after having been forcibly mobilized off the streets, which led to the replacement of the brigade commander with Colonel Taras Maksymov on 12 December. An additional 198 soldiers went AWOL during the first week of December. Censor.net, citing soldiers on the frontline, reported that brigade was used in mass infantry assaults in counterattacks against Russian positions and had "suffered significant losses from the very first days" which in turn led to "acute infantry shortages". The Kyiv Post reported that by 4 January 2025, the brigade had lost all of its CAESAR self-propelled howitzers, most of its VAB APCs, and a portion of its Leopard 2 tanks.

In late January 2025, a second Ukrainian brigade assigned to the Pokrovsk front, the 157th Mechanized Brigade, was reported to have suffered operational issues and desertion. The brigade suffered from poor training and low morale, and like the 155th Mechanized Brigade, lacked an experienced core of soldiers, consisting of only amateur recruits. The brigade reportedly deteriorated while being transferred to Pokrovsk due to high desertion rates, and diminished in size as components of the brigade were taken out and transferred to more experienced units at the front.

== See also ==
- Siege of Mariupol
- Battle of Bakhmut
- List of military engagements during the Russo-Ukrainian war (2022–present)
