= Hrodivka =

Urban locality in Donetsk Oblast, Ukraine

Hrodivka Гродівка
- Rural settlement
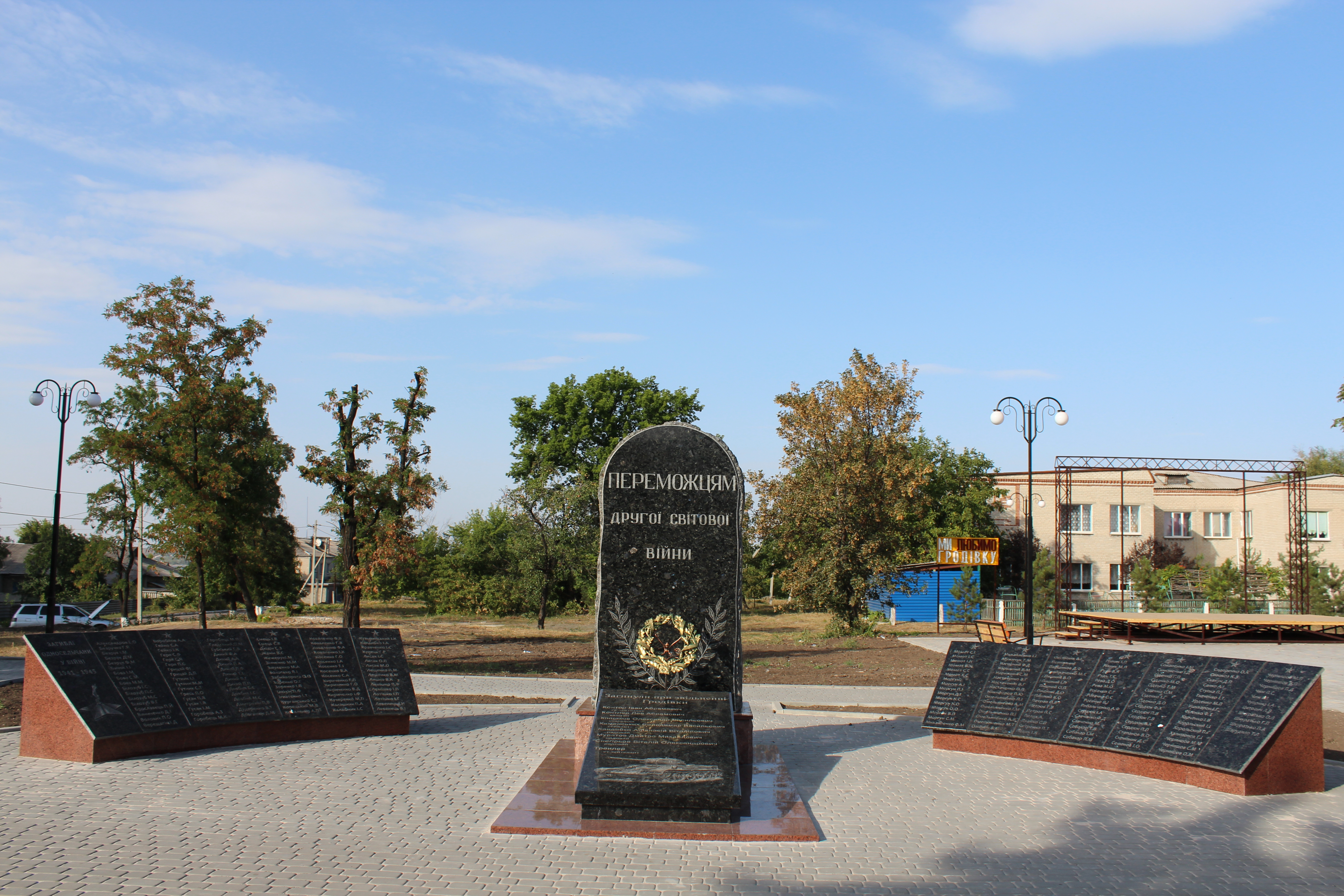
- World War II monument and mass grave for fallen Soviet soldiers
- Interactive map of Hrodivka
- Location of Hrodivka Hrodivka (Donetsk Oblast)
- Coordinates: 48°15′26″N 37°22′33″E
- Country: Ukraine
- Oblast: Donetsk Oblast
- Raion: Pokrovsk Raion
- Hromada: Hrodivka settlement hromada
- Founded: 1750

Government
  - Mayor: Lyudmila Rudenko
- Elevation: 142 m (466 ft)

Population (2022)
  - Total: 2,299
- Time zone: UTC+2
  - Summer (DST): UTC+3
- Postal code: 85345-85346
- Area code: +380 623

Hrodivka (Ukrainian: Гродівка) or Grodovka (Russian: Гродовка) is a rural settlement in Pokrovsk Raion, Donetsk Oblast, in eastern Ukraine. It serves as the administrative center of Hrodivka settlement hromada. Hrodivka is located six kilometres (3.7 mi) northeast of Novohrodivka and 15 kilometres (9.3 mi) east-southeast of Pokrovsk, the administrative center of the district. The population is 2,299 (2022 estimate).

== History ==
=== Early history ===
The rural settlement was founded in 1750 by Zaporizhzhian Cossacks in the Yekaterinoslav Governorate, and according to DeepStateMap.Live, is the oldest Cossack settlement of Pokrovsk Raion.

By 1770s, the first settlers were runaway serfs. Local historian Feodosiy Makarevskyi described the origins of Hrodivka: "In the vast, luxurious, and rich steppes between Torets and Solonenka, Zaporozhian Cossacks often lived and 'warmed their bellies'." In 1750, a place named Kholodna Ravine, which is located on the territory of the modern-day Hrodivka settlement hromada, was already documented as a Zaporizhzhian Cossack area of settlement. Following the Liquidation of the Zaporozhian Sich in 1775, the Zaporizhzhian Cossacks living in the area came to an agreement with the sitting governor of the newly established Azov Governorate, which allowed the settlement of outsiders in the area. In 1788, the number of permanent residents of Hrodivka exceeded 800 people, who were overwhelmingly of Ukrainian (Little Russian) ethnicity. (Note: Ethnic Ukrainians were commonly called "Little Russians" under the rule of the Russian Empire.)

=== 20th century ===
At the start of the 20th century, it had a population of about 5,700 people and was part of Bakhmutsky Uyezd, Yekaterinoslav Governorate within the Russian Empire. On October 27, 1938, Grodovka received the status of an urban-type settlement.

The town was occupied by Nazi Germany during World War II from November 1941 until 8 September 1943. The Germans operated a subcamp of the Stalag 378 prisoner-of-war camp in Hrodivka. Prior to the liberation of the settlement, 1,012 of the area's inhabitants fought to recapture Hrodivka, of whom 204 died. During the winter of 1943–1944, it was the site of minor tank engagements between the Soviet Union and Nazi Germany.

=== 21st century ===
==== Russian invasion of Ukraine ====
During the Russian invasion of Ukraine, Russia has increasingly threatened Hrodivka as their forces advance towards the city of Pokrovsk, the main attack direction in the Donbas theatre of the war. The settlement is under constant shelling, causing the death of a civilian and damage to infrastructure, and these attacks have increased as Russia draws closer to the settlement.

In early August 2024, the Donetsk Oblast Military Administration ordered an evacuation of families and children in Hrodivka as well as other settlements in the region in the threat of impeding Russian advances. Immediately prior to the evacuation order, an estimated 70 people were still remaining in the town.

On 9 August, Russian forces advanced up to the town's outskirts.

On 13 August, Russian forces entered the town, and following then continued to advance through the south-eastern portion of it.

By 17 September, Russian forces captured most of the town, with the exception of the northwestern outskirts. Russia claimed full control over the town on 7 October. The town's capture was confirmed on 21 October.

== Demographics ==
The population at the 2001 Ukrainian census was 3,163. The native language of the population:

Native languages in Hrodivka
	percent
Ukrainian	86.91%
Russian	12.77%
Belarusian	0.09%
Armenian	0.03%
others	0.20%

In 2021, it formed an agglomeration with a population of 10,850 people, where 2,628 people lived in Hrodivka itself.

== Economy ==
Hrodivka has been known as a centre of mining industry and brick production.
