= Moskovske =

Moskovske (Ukrainian: Московське) may refer to several places in Ukraine:

- Moskovske (urban-type settlement), Donetsk Oblast
- Moskovske (village), Donetsk Oblast
- Moskovske, Romny Raion, Sumy Oblast
- Moskovske, Shostka Raion, Sumy Oblast
