= Stupnytskyi =

Stupnytskyi is a surname. Notable people with the surname include:

- Ivan Stupnytskyi (1816–1890), Ukrainian Greek Catholic hierarch
- Leonid Stupnytskyi (1891–1944), Ukrainian Insurgent Army officer
