= Mykhailivka, Novohrodivka urban hromada, Pokrovsk Raion, Donetsk Oblast =

Mykhailivka Михайлівка
- Village
- Mykhailivka shown within Ukraine Mykhailivka (Donetsk Oblast)
- Coordinates: 48°8′30″N 37°21′10″E
- Country: Ukraine
- Oblast: Donetsk Oblast
- Raion: Pokrovsk Raion
- Hromada: Novohrodivka urban hromada
- Founded: 1885
- Elevation: 173 m (568 ft)

Population
  - Total: 1,269
- Postal code: 85380
- Area code: +380 623

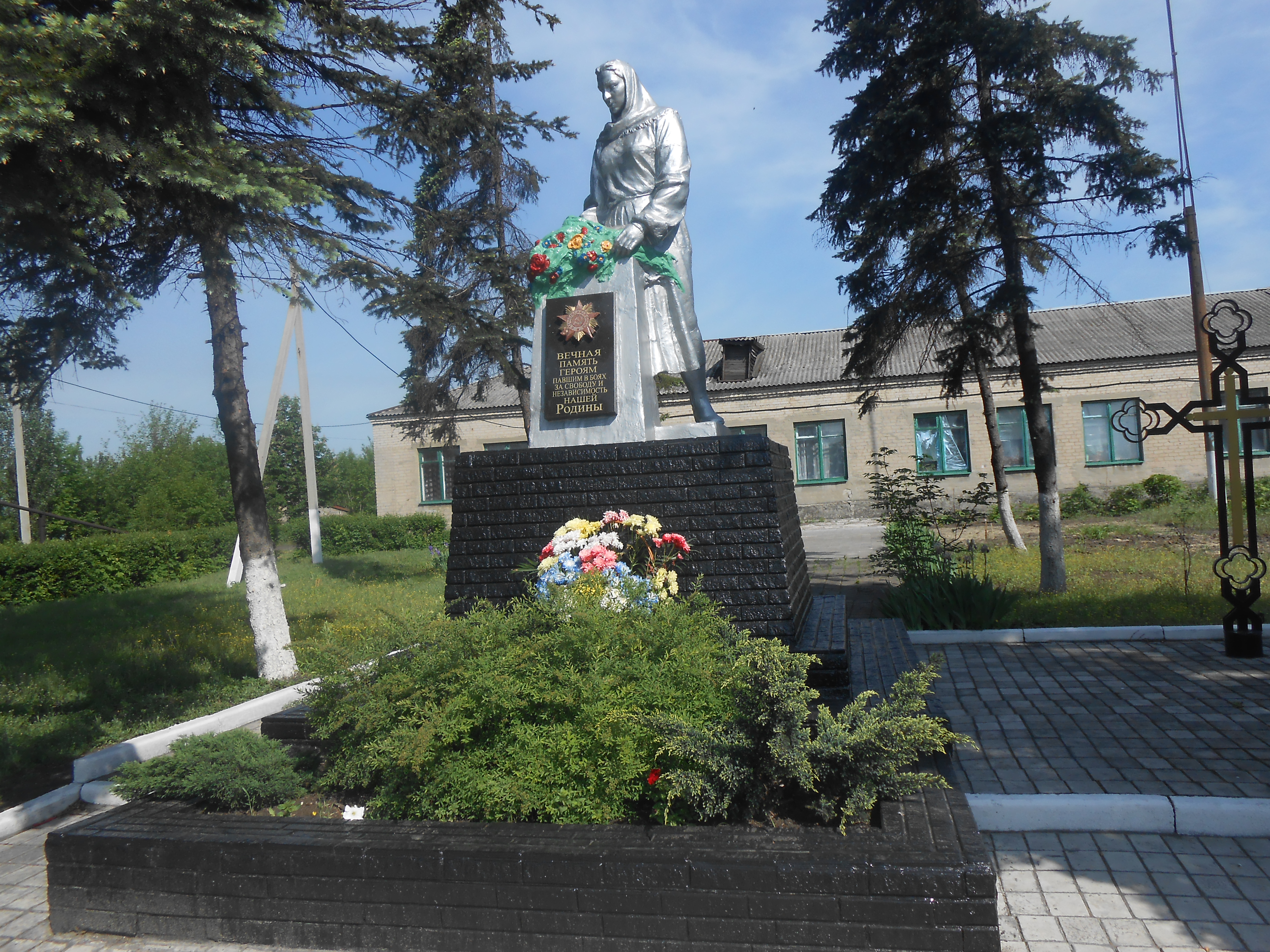
Mass grave and monument for Soviet soldiers in World War II

Mykhailivka (Ukrainian: Михайлівка) is a village in Novohrodivka urban hromada, Pokrovsk Raion, Donetsk Oblast, Ukraine. The population was estimated to be 890 in 2021.

== History ==
The village was founded in 1885 by German Mennonite settlers from Molochansk as Kotlyarivka, 35 kilometers northwest of Donetsk.

In 1911, the population was 237; in 1919, 200; in 1926, 431, of which 392 were Germans.

The village was captured by Russia during the Pokrovsk offensive of the Russian invasion of Ukraine around 1 September 2024 and later confirmed by the Russian defense ministry on 13 October 2024.

== Demographics ==
According to the 2001 Ukrainian census, the population of the village was 1,269, of which 74.39% stated Ukrainian to be their native language, 25.45% stated their native language to be Russian, and 0.08% to be German.
