= Mykolaivka, Novohrodivka urban hromada, Pokrovsk Raion, Donetsk Oblast =

Mykolaivka Миколаївка
- Village
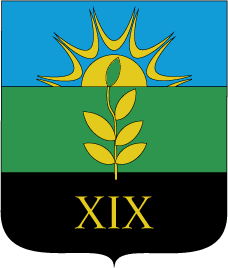
- Coat of arms

- Mykolaivka shown within Ukraine Mykolaivka (Donetsk Oblast)
- Coordinates: 48°11′12″N 37°23′11″E
- Country: Ukraine
- Oblast: Donetsk Oblast
- Raion: Pokrovsk Raion
- Hromada: Novohrodivka urban hromada
- Elevation: 216 m (709 ft)

Population
  - Total: 805
- Time zone: UTC+2
  - Summer (DST): UTC+3 (EEST)
- Postal code: 85347
- Area code: +380 623

Mykolaivka (Ukrainian: Миколаївка) is a village in Novohrodivka urban hromada, Pokrovsk Raion, Donetsk Oblast, Ukraine. The population was 805 in the 2001 Ukrainian census.

== History ==
=== Russo-Ukrainian War ===
On 14 August 2024, the village was entered by Russian forces amidst their offensive to reach the city of Pokrovsk, and was captured between around 17–23 August.

== Demographics ==
According to the 2001 Ukrainian census, the population of the village was 805, of which 47.45% stated Ukrainian to be their native language, 52.05% stated their native language to be Russian, and 0.12% to be Belarusian.
