= Novooleksandrivka, Pokrovsk Raion, Donetsk Oblast =

Village in Ukraine

Novooleksandrivka Новоолександрівка
- Village
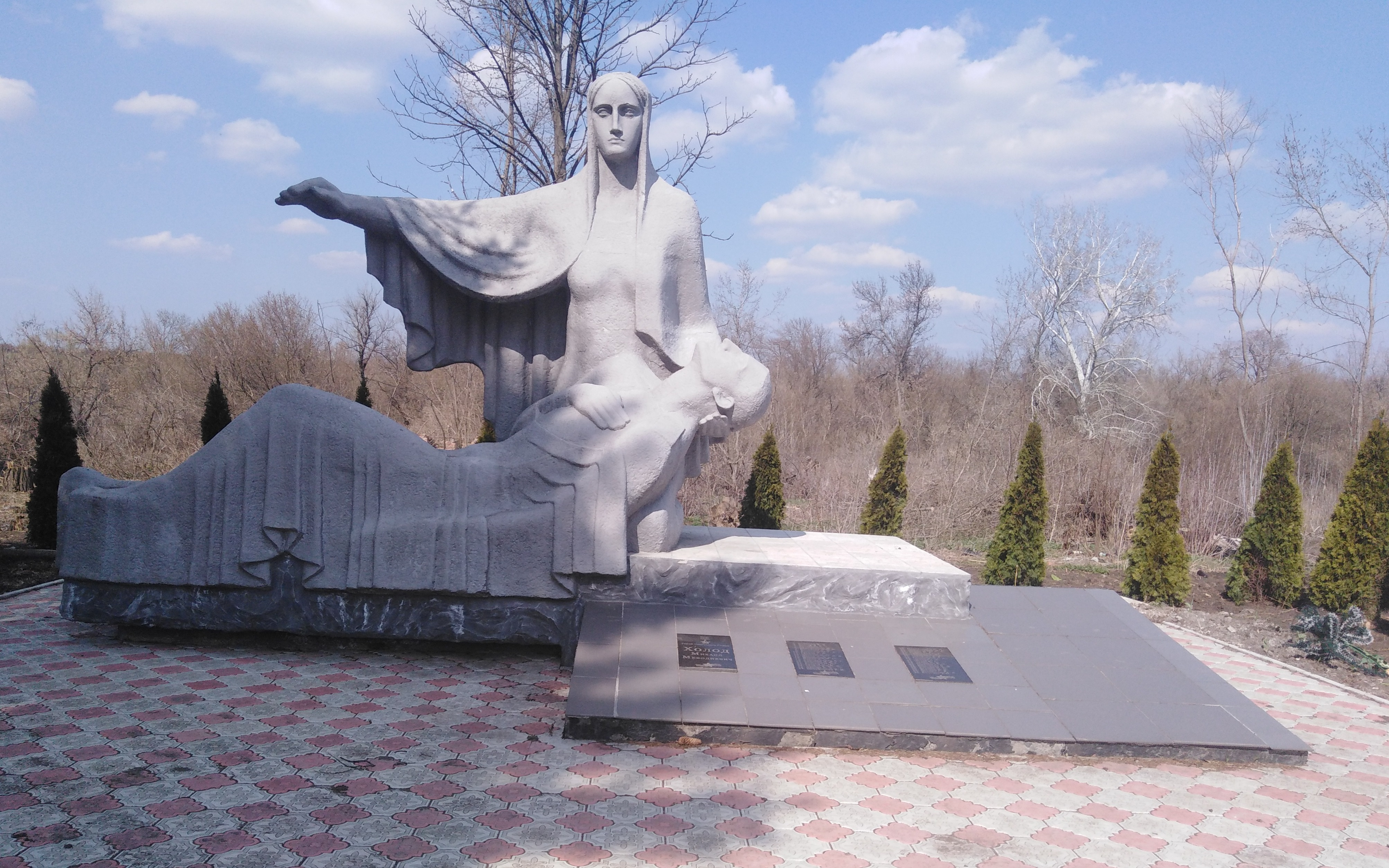
- WWII Novooleksandrivka grave of Soviet soldiers and monument to fallen villagers

- Location of Novooleksandrivka Novooleksandrivka (Ukraine)
- Coordinates: 48°16′54″N 37°33′20″E
- Country: Ukraine
- Oblast: Donetsk Oblast
- District: Pokrovsk Raion
- Hromada: Hrodivka settlement hromada
- Elevation: 154 m (505 ft)

Population (2001 census)
  - Total: 693
- Time zone: UTC+2 (EET)
  - Summer (DST): UTC+3 (EEST)
- Postal code: 85352
- Area code: +380 623
- Website: Official website

Novooleksandrivka (Ukrainian: Новоолександрівка) is a village in Hrodivka settlement hromada, Pokrovsk Raion, Donetsk Oblast, Ukraine. The village is about 32 km from the district centre, accessible via the H32 highway.

== History ==
=== Russo-Ukrainian War ===
Russian invasion of Ukraine

During the Russian invasion of Ukraine, Russian milbloggers reported that Russian forces had reached the village outskirts on 6 May 2024. The village was captured by Russia in June 2024.

== Demographics ==
According to the 2001 Ukrainian census, the village had a population of 693 people, with 82.83% of respondents indicating Ukrainian as their native language, 16.45% indicating Russian, and 0.43% indicating Belarusian.
