= Halytsynivka =

Halytsynivka Галицинівка
- Village
- Interactive map of Halytsynivka
- Location of Halytsynivka within Ukraine Halytsynivka (Donetsk Oblast)
- Coordinates: 48.100556°N 37.445833°E
- Country: Ukraine
- Oblast: Donetsk Oblast
- Raion: Pokrovsk Raion
- Hromada: Novohrodivka urban hromada
- Founded: 1888
- Elevation: 133 m (436 ft)

Population (2001 census)
  - Total: 1,111
- Time zone: UTC+2 (EET)
  - Summer (DST): UTC+3 (EEST)
- Postal code: 85620
- Area code: +380 6278
- KATOTTH: UA14160170030017951

Halytsynivka (Ukrainian: Галицинівка; Russian: Галицыновка) is a village in Pokrovsk Raion (district) in Donetsk Oblast of eastern Ukraine, at 36.2 kilometres (22.5 mi) west-northwest (WNW) from the centre of Donetsk city, on the banks of the Vovcha river.

== History ==
The village was founded in 1888

On November 7 1917, in accordance with the Third Universal of the Ukrainian Central Rada, it became part of the Ukrainian People's Republic.

=== Russo-Ukrainian War ===
The War in Donbass, that started in mid-April 2014, brought along both civilian and military casualties. Two Ukrainian servicemen were killed near the village by shelling from "Grad" multiple rocket launchers on 3 February 2017.

In early September 2024, the village was reportedly captured by Russia as part of the Pokrovsk offensive of the Russian invasion of Ukraine.

== Demographics ==
In 2001 the settlement had 1111 inhabitants. Native language as of the Ukrainian Census of 2001:

- Ukrainian — 73.18%
- Russian 26.73%
- Greek — 0.09%
