= Hrodivka settlement hromada =

Hrodivka settlement hromada Гродівська селищна громада
- Hromada
- Interactive map of Hrodivka settlement hromada
- Country: Ukraine
- Oblast: Donetsk Oblast
- Raion: Pokrovsk Raion
- Admin. center: Hrodivka

Government
  - Head: Volodymyr Vasylyovych Rudenko

Area
  - Total: 340.3 km^{2} (131.4 sq mi)

Population (2020)
  - Total: 9,518
  - Density: 27.97/km^{2} (72.44/sq mi)
- Settlements: 32
- Rural settlements: 3
- Villages: 29

Hrodivka settlement hromada (Ukrainian: Гродівська селищна громада) is a hromada of Ukraine, located in Pokrovsk Raion, Donetsk Oblast. Its administrative center is the town of Hrodivka.

It has an area of 340.3 square kilometres (131.4 mi^{2}) and a population of 9,518, as of 2020.

The hromada includes 32 settlements: 3 rural settlements (Hrodivka, Lozuvatske, and Novoekonomichne), and 29 villages:

- Balahan
- Baranivka
- Fedorivka
- Ivanivka
- Kozatske
- Krasnyi Yar
- Krutyi Yar
- Lysychne
- Malynivka
- Mykhailivka
- Mykolaivka
- Mykolaivka, Novoekonomichne starosta okruh
- Myrne
- Myroliubivka
- Novooleksandrivka
- Novotoretske
- Prohres
- Promin
- Razine
- Serhiivka
- Shevchenko Pershe
- Svyrydonivka
- Tymofiivka
- Vesele
- Vovche
- Vozdvyzhenka
- Yelyzavetivka
- Yevhenivka
- Zhuravka

== Demographics ==
As of the 2001 Ukrainian census, the hromada had a population of 12,386 inhabitants. The linguitic composition was as follows:

Native languages (2001)
	percent
Ukrainian	58.2%
Russian	41.5%
Belarusian	0.1%
others	0.1%

== See also ==
- List of hromadas of Ukraine
