= Novoekonomichne =

Urban locality in Donetsk Oblast, Ukraine

Novoekonomichne Новоекономічне
- Rural settlement
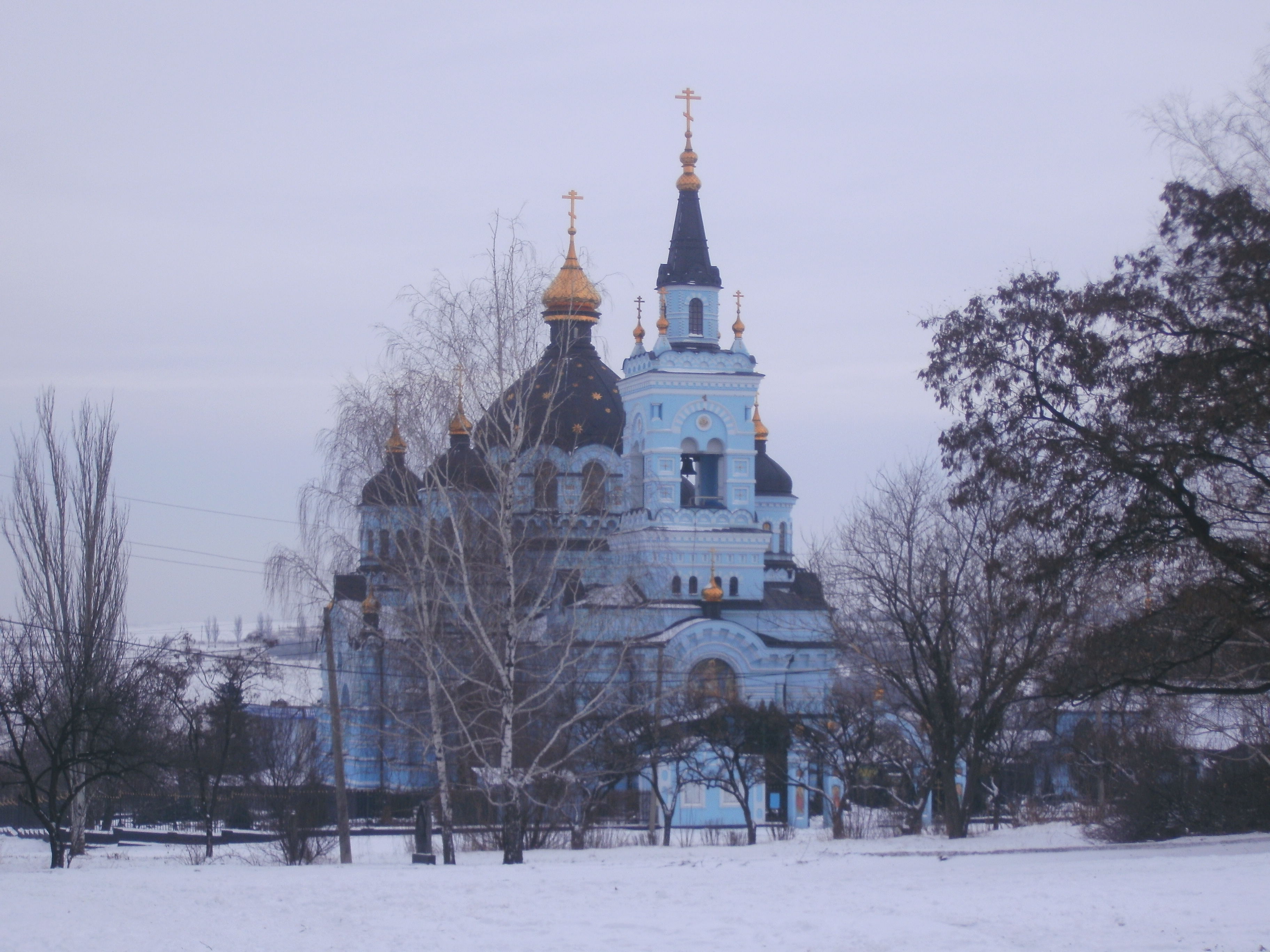
- Interactive map of Novoekonomichne
- Location of Novoekonomichne Novoekonomichne (Ukraine)
- Coordinates: 48°19′40″N 37°19′55″E
- Country: Ukraine
- Oblast: Donetsk Oblast
- Raion: Pokrovsk Raion
- Hromada: Hrodivka settlement hromada
- Elevation: 137 m (449 ft)

Population (2022)
  - Total: 2,763
- Time zone: UTC+2
  - Summer (DST): UTC+3
- Postal code: 85340-85342
- Area code: +380 623

Novoekonomichne (Ukrainian: Новоекономічне) is a rural settlement in Pokrovsk Raion, Donetsk Oblast, eastern Ukraine. The population is 2,763 (2022 estimate). More than 90 percent of residents have already left the settlement following the 2022 Russian invasion. As of 25 July 2025, Russian forces likely seized control of the village as part of their ongoing Pokrovsk offensive.

== History ==
During World War II, the German occupiers operated a subcamp of the Stalag 378 prisoner-of-war camp in the settlement.

== Demographics ==
Native language as of the Ukrainian Census of 2001:

- Ukrainian 9.12%
- Russian 90.62%
- Belarusian and Moldovan (Romanian) 0.03%
