= Yevhenivka, Pokrovsk Raion, Donetsk Oblast =

Yevhenivka Євгенівка
- Village
- Interactive map of Yevhenivka
- Location of Yevhenivka within Ukraine Yevhenivka (Ukraine)
- Coordinates: 48.229167°N 37.52°E
- Country: Ukraine
- Oblast: Donetsk Oblast
- Raion: Pokrovsk Raion
- Hromada: Hrodivka settlement hromada
- Elevation: 188 m (617 ft)

Population (2001 census)
  - Total: 99
- Time zone: UTC+2 (EET)
  - Summer (DST): UTC+3 (EEST)
- Postal code: 85351
- Area code: +380 623
- KATOTTH: UA14160050080046378

Yevhenivka (Ukrainian: Євгенівка; Russian: Евгеновка) is a village in Hrodivka settlement hromada, Pokrovsk Raion, Donetsk Oblast, Ukraine. It is located 31.59 kilometres (19.63 mi) northwest by north (NWbN) of the centre of Donetsk city. On 11 July 2024, the village was captured by Russian forces during the Russian Invasion of Ukraine.

== Demographics ==
As of the 2001 Ukrainian census, the settlement had 99 inhabitants, whose native languages were 83.96% Ukrainian and 16.04% Russian.
