= Novohrodivka urban hromada =

Novohrodivka urban hromada Новогродівська міська громада
- Hromada
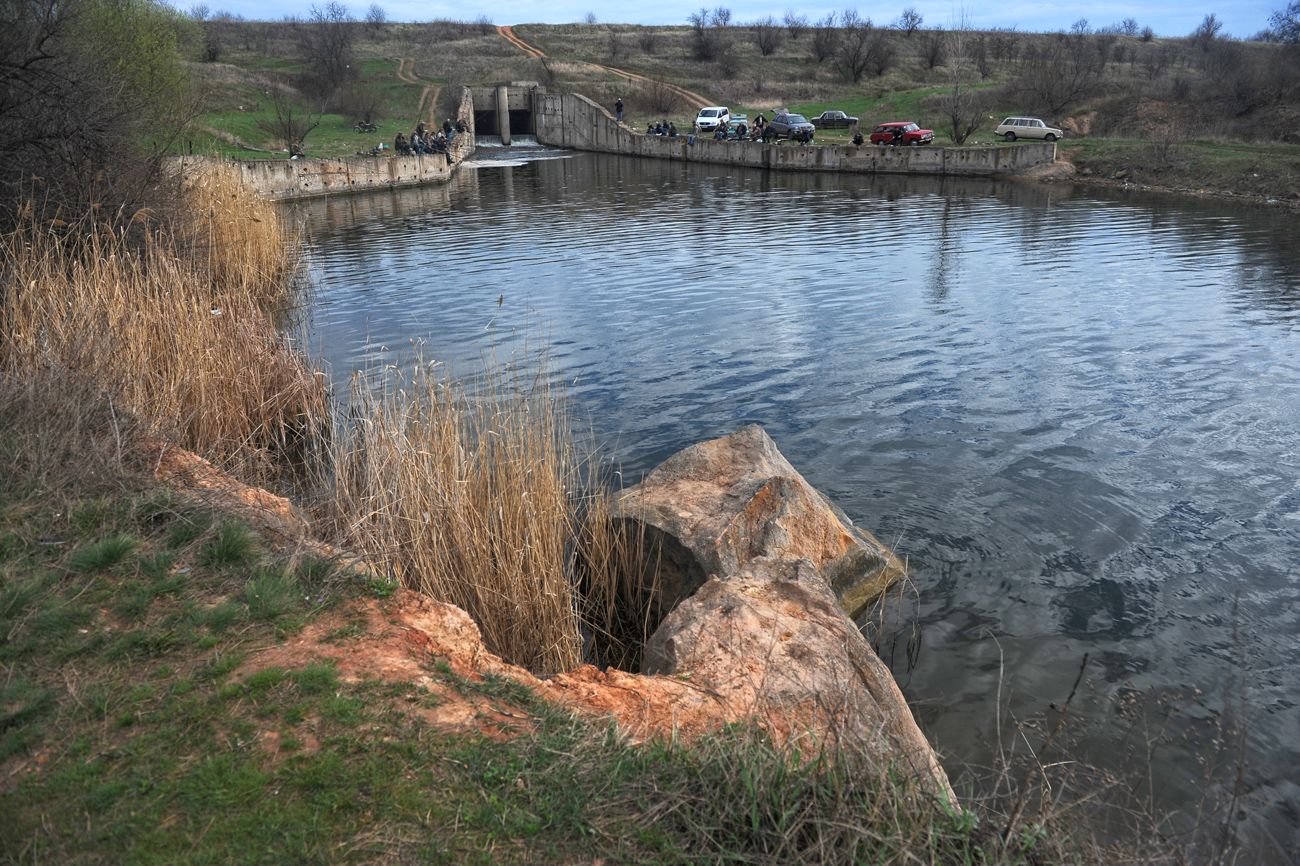
- Karlovskoye Reservoir
- Interactive map of Novohrodivka urban hromada
- Country: Ukraine
- Oblast: Donetsk
- Raion: Pokrovsk

Area
  - Total: 157.2 km^{2} (60.7 sq mi)

Population (2020)
  - Total: 19,380
  - Density: 123.3/km^{2} (319.3/sq mi)
- Settlements: 15
- Cities: 1
- Rural settlements: 2
- Villages: 12

Novohrodivka urban hromada (Ukrainian: Новогродівська міська громада) is a hromada of Ukraine, located in Pokrovsk Raion, Donetsk Oblast. Its administrative center is the city Novohrodivka.

It has an area of 157.2 square kilometres (60.7 mi^{2}) and a population of 19,380, as of 2020.

The hromada contains 15 settlements: 1 city (Novohrodivka), 2 rural settlements (Komyshivka and Ptyche), 12 villages:

- Halytsynivka
- Dolynivka
- Zavitne
- Kalynove
- Karlivka
- Lisivka
- Marynivka
- Memryk
- Mykolaivka
- Mykhailivka
- Novozhelanne
- Orlivka

== See also ==
- List of hromadas of Ukraine
