= 31st Mechanized Brigade (Ukraine) =

Ukrainian Ground Forces formation

- 31 окрема механізована бригада
- Shoulder Sleeve Insignia
- Active: February 17, 2023 - present
- Country: Ukraine
- Branch: Ukrainian Ground Forces
- Role: Mechanized Infantry
- Size: 2,000
- Part of: Operational Command North
- Garrison/HQ: Zhytomyr Oblast
- Patron: Leonid Stupnytskyi
- Motto: Ferro Et Igne
- Engagements: Russo-Ukrainian War: 2023 Ukrainian Counteroffensive; Battle of Avdiivka; Velyka Novosilka offensive

Brigade soldiers at the shooting range

The 31st Separate Mechanized Brigade named after Cornet General Leonid Stupnytskyi (Ukrainian: 31 окремої механізованої бригади) 31 ОМБр is a brigade of the Ukrainian Ground Forces formed in 2023. The brigade is one of the brigades the Ukrainian army formed on its own, with mostly older ex-Soviet equipment, including T-64BV tanks as well as American-made MaxxPro armored trucks. The brigade has been described as inexperienced by Forbes.

== History ==
The brigade was formed during the winter of 2022–23.

By June 2023 the unit was involved in counteroffensive operations around the village of Rivnopil, which it liberated on 25 June. The brigade was involved in the battle of Avdiivka.

On 24 July 2024, the brigade was fighting in the village of Prohres when it became encircled by Russian forces. DeepStateMap.Live reported that the Brigade had not been ordered to withdraw. Forbes reported that the brigade had collapsed and that the 47th Mechanized Brigade was sent to prevent a deeper Russian breakthrough and that the 47th and remnants of the 31st attempting to hold the line west of Prohres. On 25 July 2024 DeepStateMap reported that the 1st and 3rd Mechanized Battalions managed to breakout of the encirclement with the aid of coordinated artillery, air reconnaissance and parts of adjacent units. However, DeepStateMap also reported that the 47th Mechanized Brigade, along with 31st Mechanized Brigade remain "the main backbone of defense" in that area and that the situation is "conditionally, consistently bad and there is no improvement so far".

On 14 July 2025, the brigade was awarded the honorary title "named after Cornet General Leonid Stupnytskyi" by decree of President Volodymyr Zelenskyy.

== Structure ==
As of 2023 the brigade's structure is as follows:

- 31st Mechanized Brigade,
  - Headquarters & Headquarters Company
  - 1st Mechanized Battalion
  - 2nd Mechanized Battalion
  - 3rd Mechanized Battalion
- 45th Rifle Battalion (unit number A4062)
  - Tank Battalion
  - Artillery Group
  - Anti-Aircraft Defense Battalion
  - Reconnaissance Company
  - Engineer Battalion
  - Logistic Battalion
  - Maintenance Battalion
  - Signal Company
  - Radar Company
  - Medical Company
  - Chemical, Biological, Radiological and Nuclear Protection Company
