= Lisivka, Donetsk Oblast =

Lisivka Лісівка
- Village
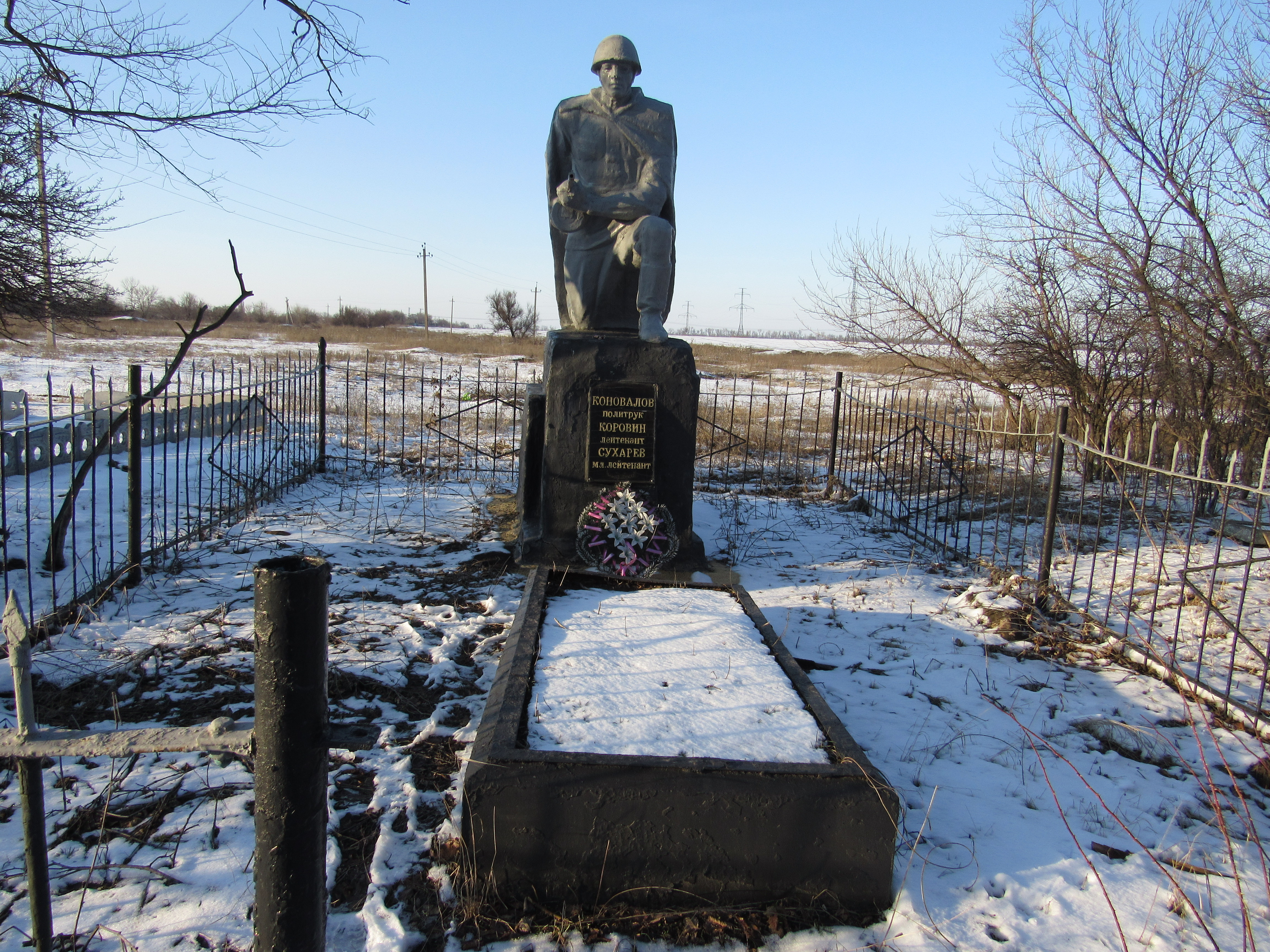
- Interactive map of Lisivka
- Location of Lisivka within Ukraine Lisivka (Donetsk Oblast)
- Coordinates: 48°05′51″N 37°22′50″E
- Country: Ukraine
- Oblast: Donetsk Oblast
- Raion: Pokrovsk Raion
- Hromada: Novohrodivka urban hromada
- Founded: 1885

Area
  - Total: 0.949 km^{2} (0.366 sq mi)
- Elevation: 163 m (535 ft)

Population (2001 census)
  - Total: 295
  - Density: 311/km^{2} (805/sq mi)
- Time zone: UTC+2 (EET)
  - Summer (DST): UTC+3 (EEST)
- Postal code: 85620
- Area code: +380 6278
- KATOTTH: UA14160170080099199

Lisivka (Ukrainian: Лісівка; Russian: Лесовка) is a village in Novohrodivka urban hromada, Pokrovsk Raion, Donetsk Oblast, eastern Ukraine. It is located 33.05 kilometres (20.54 mi) west-northwest (WNW) from the centre of Donetsk city.

== History ==
It was founded in 1885 under the Russian Empire.

On November 7th 1917, in accordance with the Third Universal of the Ukrainian Central Rada, it became part of the Ukrainian People's Republic.

=== Russian invasion of Ukraine ===
The village was captured by Russian Forces in September 2024, during the full-scale Russian invasion of Ukraine.

== Demographics ==
As of the 2001 Ukrainian census, the settlement had 295 inhabitants, whose native languages were 46.43% Ukrainian, 53.25% Russian and 0.32% Belarusian.

== Notable people ==
- Valery Alekseyevich Bespalov
