= Bazhane =

Bazhane Бажане
- Village
- Interactive map of Bazhane
- Location of Bazhane within Ukraine Bazhane (Ukraine)
- Coordinates: 48°10′56″N 37°26′16″E
- Country: Ukraine
- Oblast: Donetsk Oblast
- Raion: Pokrovsk Raion
- Hromada: Novohrodivka urban hromada
- Elevation: 194 m (636 ft)

Population (2001 census)
  - Total: 274
- Time zone: UTC+2 (EET)
  - Summer (DST): UTC+3 (EEST)
- Postal code: 85381
- Area code: +380 623
- KATOTTH: UA14160170130089522

Bazhane (Ukrainian: Бажане), formerly known as Novozhelanne (Ukrainian: Новожеланне; Russian: Новожеланное), is a village in Novohrodivka urban hromada, Pokrovsk Raion, Donetsk Oblast, Ukraine. It is located 32.75 kilometres (20.35 mi) northwest by north (NWbN) from the centre of Donetsk city.

== History ==
=== Russian invasion of Ukraine ===
In August 2024, during the full-scale Russian invasion of Ukraine, the village was captured by Russian Forces.

In 2024 the Verkhovna Rada renamed the village as a part of the derussification campaign.

== Demographics ==
As of the 2001 Ukrainian census, the settlement had 274 inhabitants, whose native languages were 87.59% Ukrainian and 12.41% Russian.
