= Romanivka, Berdychiv Raion =

Village in Zhytomyr Oblast, Ukraine

Romanivka Романівка
- Village
- Location of Romanivka Romanivka (Ukraine)
- Coordinates: 49°53′25″N 28°30′24″E
- Country: Ukraine
- Oblast: Zhytomyr Oblast
- Raion: Berdychiv Raion
- Hromada: Romanivka settlement hromada
- Founded: 1350

Area
  - Total: 2.095 km^{2} (0.809 sq mi)
- Elevation: 267 m (876 ft)

Population (2001)
  - Total: 915
  - Density: 437/km^{2} (1,130/sq mi)
- Postal codes: 13319, 13308
- Area code: +380 4143

Romanivka (Ukrainian: Романівка), previously known as Radianske until 2016, and Zhydivtsi from the beginning of the Soviet period until 1934, is a village in Ukraine, located in the Berdychiv Raion of Zhytomyr Oblast.

== Geography ==
The village is located on the Unava River, a tributary of the Irpin River, located in the Dnieper River Basin. It is bordered to the east by the village of Koshliaky, and bordered on the west by the village of Yablunivka. It is the namesake of the Romanivka settlement hromada, and is 6 km from the city of Berdychiv.

== History and etymology ==
Romanivka is named after merchant Roman Rubinstein (Russian: Роман Рубинштейн), a baptized Jew who had bought a plot of land for settlement in the Kiev Governorate and became well-liked among Russian aristocrats for helping abolish Ashkenazi Qahal in Imperial Russia. Rubenstein was the grandfather of musicians Anton Rubinstein and Nikolai Rubinstein. The settlement was intended for poor residents who wished to engage in farming. By 1834, 72 households of Jews were living in the town. By 1859, 852 Jews were living in the settlement.

In 2016, the Verkhovna Rada renamed the village to Romanivka, which was its name under Imperial Russian rule.

As a result of the Russian Invasion of Ukraine, wildfires began to spread in various parts of the country, caused by flora catching on fire as a result of bombing campaigns. The village of Romanivka was nearly caught ablaze as a result of a multi-hectare fire in the Berdychiv region. Firefighters mitigated the spread and localized the burning before the village was reached.

== The Holocaust ==
Similar to most of the Berdychiv region, the Jews of Romanivka were murdered during the Invasion of Russia by Nazi forces. Between 15 September 1941 and 16 September 1941, nearly all of the Jews were killed in the region. After having their valuables plundered, Jews were forced to dig their own mass graves, were then shot in the back of the head, and then pushed into the graves. Witnesses stated that because the cries of victims were so loud, German aviation forces flew planes overhead to block out the noise. While it is not known how many Jews of Romanivka died exactly, 18,640 in the Berdychiv district were murdered by the end of the war, mostly near the village. Although most of the Jews were executed in September, some were found in hiding around a month later, and were executed in the town of Myrne (then Sokulino) on 3 November 1941.

When asked about by Soviet interrogators about the mass murder event in the district, witness Ivan Nikiforovich Nikolaychuk said that:

Long before the mass execution of the civilian population of Berdichev, the Germans drove a lot of prisoners here [Romanivka] to [dig] the pits. At the same time, the Germans blew up the pits with explosives. One day (I don't remember which one), in September 1941, the Germans and policemen drove a lot of people past our hut to the pits that had previously... cleared. Bringing them to the pits, they began to select separately adults, separately children. [If] mothers did not give their children, then they were immediately shot ... People were lined up in [rows of] 10-15 and [were] shot with machine guns. This procedure continued until they were all killed.

In 1983, a memorial sign was placed on the road leading from Berdychiv to Raygorodok, stating "In these places in September 1941, 18,640 peaceful Soviet citizens were brutally tortured and shot by the Nazi invaders. Eternal memory to the victims of fascism", and in 1996, a monument was erected at the site of the mass murder of Jews.

== Religion ==
Although a large portion of Jews used to occupy the settlement, it is now mostly composed of Orthodox, Protestant, and Catholic Christians. The Church of the Archangel Michael, a Lutheran church in Romanivka, came under brief notoriety after claims that its icon of Jesus Christ began miraculously dripping liquid around where his thorns sat during crucifixion.

== Demographics ==
Recorded in 1911, 379 Jews lived in the village, much lower than the 852 Jewish population in 1859. By 1926 (according to the 1926 census of Zhydivtsi village council) there were 190 households with 887 people in Zhydivtsi, including 755 Ukrainians and 132 Poles. In Romanivka's jurisdiction, there were 51 households with 254 inhabitants, including 84 Ukrainians, 132 Jews, and 8 Poles.

In the 1989 Soviet Census, it was recorded that the village's population was 557. By 2001, the population had risen to 915 people.

== See also ==
- Inside the Church of Michael the Archangel - YouTube
- Footage from Romanivka in People's Control News Report - YouTube
