= Zavitne, Donetsk Oblast =

Zavitne Завітне
- Village
- Interactive map of Zavitne
- Location of Zavitne within Ukraine Zavitne (Ukraine)
- Coordinates: 48°10′35″N 37°26′07″E
- Country: Ukraine
- Oblast: Donetsk Oblast
- Raion: Pokrovsk Raion
- Hromada: Novohrodivka urban hromada
- Elevation: 201 m (659 ft)

Population (2001 census)
  - Total: 308
- Time zone: UTC+2 (EET)
  - Summer (DST): UTC+3 (EEST)
- Postal code: 85381
- Area code: +380 623
- KATOTTH: UA14160170050042011

Zavitne (Ukrainian: Завітне; Russian: Заветное) is a village in Novohrodivka urban hromada, Pokrovsk Raion, Donetsk Oblast, Ukraine.

== History ==
=== Russian invasion of Ukraine ===
The village was captured by Russian Forces in August 2024, during the full-scale Russian invasion of Ukraine.

== Demographics ==
As of the 2001 Ukrainian census, the settlement had 308 inhabitants, whose native languages were 27.27% Ukrainian, 72.4% Russian and 0.32% Armenian.
