= Kalynove, Pokrovsk Raion, Donetsk Oblast =

Kalynove Калинове
- Village
- Interactive map of Kalynove
- Location of Kalynove within Ukraine Kalynove (Ukraine)
- Coordinates: 48°08′26″N 37°26′27″E
- Country: Ukraine
- Oblast: Donetsk Oblast
- Raion: Pokrovsk Raion
- Hromada: Novohrodivka urban hromada
- Founded: 1885
- Elevation: 201 m (659 ft)

Population (2001 census)
  - Total: 219
- Time zone: UTC+2 (EET)
  - Summer (DST): UTC+3 (EEST)
- Postal code: 85382
- Area code: +380 623
- KATOTTH: UA14160170060039203

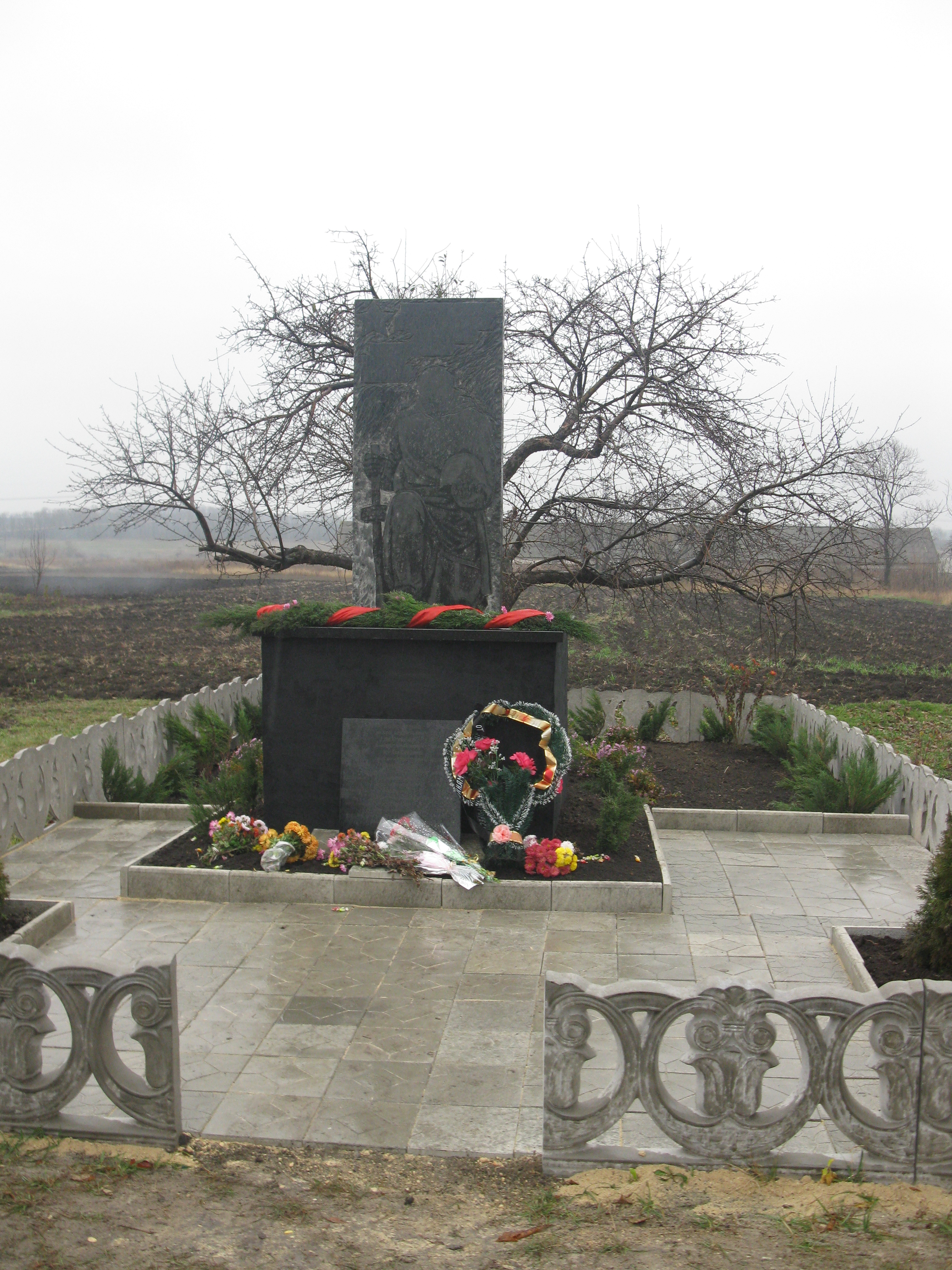

Kalynove (Ukrainian: Калинове; Russian: Калиново) is a village in Novohrodivka urban hromada, Pokrovsk Raion, Donetsk Oblast, eastern Ukraine. It is located 31.04 kilometres (19.29 mi) northwest by north (NWbN) from the centre of Donetsk city.

== History ==
The settlement was founded in 1885.

=== Russian invasion of Ukraine ===
The village was captured by Russian Forces in August 2024, during the full-scale Russian invasion of Ukraine.

== Demographics ==
As of the 2001 Ukrainian census, the settlement had 1,192 inhabitants, whose native languages were 74.89% Ukrainian and 25.11% Russian.
