= Leonid Stupnytskyi =

Ukrainian Insurgent Army officer (1891-1944)

- Born: 10 June [O.S. 29 May] 1891; Romanivka, Russian Empire
- Died: 30 July 1944 (aged 53); Derman, Ukrainian SSR, Soviet Union
- Cause of death: Suicide
- Alma mater: Kyiv National University named after Taras Shevchenko
- Spouse: Lidia Bednarska (1922–1944)
- Children: Yuriy Stupnytskyi, Serhiy Stupnytskyi
- Military career
- Allegiance: Russian Empire; Ukrainian People's Republic (UNR)
- Branch: Russian Imperial Army; Army of the UNR; Ukrainian Insurgent Army
- Service years: 1920–1944
- Nickname: Honcharenko
- Conflicts: World War I, Ukrainian-Soviet War, Battle for Korosten, World War II,
- Awards: The Military Order of St. George, Cross of Simon Petliura

Leonid Venedyktovych Stupnytskyi (Note: Ukrainian: Леонід Венедиктович Ступницький, Polish: Leonid Stupnicki, alias Honcharenko) (10 June [O.S. 29 May] 1891 – 30 July 1944) was a Ukrainian Insurgent Army officer.

== Early life ==
He was born in a peasant family. His father, Venedikt, was friends with leading figures of Ukrainian culture, visited Tadei Rylsky, and was interested in the ideas of narodniks. In his childhood, Leonid was friends with Maksym Rylsky. He graduated from high school in Skvyra and then from the agronomy faculty of Kyiv University. During World War I, he was drafted into the Russian army and commanded a mounted unit with the rank of captain.

== In the Army of the Ukrainian People's Republic ==
After graduating from school, he served in the 8th and 12th (from November 29, 1915) reserve battalions. In the Army of the Ukrainian People's Republic During the liberation struggles of 1917-1921, he was a lieutenant colonel of the Army of the Ukrainian People's Republic. In the Ukrainian army from 1918, in 1920 he was a regiment commander in the Volhynian division. He participated in the second winter march of the Ukrainian People's Army, in November 1921 he was the commander of a horse unit with the rank of colonel in the insurgent unit of Yurko Tyutyunnyk, he distinguished himself in the battles for Korosten. In the interwar period he lived in Poland, where he worked as an agronomist in Volhynia.

During the Second Winter Campaign of late 1921, he commanded a separate cavalry unit of the Volyn group of Yuriy Tyutyunnyk, at the head of which Korosten was captured.

== Interwar Period ==
In 1922, Leonid Stupnytskyi, while living in Ostroh, married teacher Lidia Bednarska. They had two sons, Yuriy (1923) and Serhiy (1932).

Since 1922 he lived in Volyn. In 1922–1940, he worked as an agronomist at the Babyn sugar factory in the village of Babyn, Goshchan district, Rivne region. In 1939, after the Soviet army occupied part of the territory of Poland, he was arrested by the NKVD and sentenced to 5 years in prison, and his family was deported to Kazakhstan. Until 1941, he was under investigation in the Brest prison, from where he was released by the Germans.In 1940, he was arrested by the NKVD and sentenced to 5 years in prison. In June 1941, after the German aggression against the USSR, he was released.

In 1941, he was the commander of the Ukrainian police school in Rivne and the chief of staff of the Poleska Sich. At the same time, he headed the social welfare department in the city administration.

== The Ukrainian Insurgent Army ==
In July–August 1941, he headed the First Ukrainian Regiment named after Kholodnyi Yar in Rivne, created by the revolutionary wing of the OUN (Bandera) as a formation of the Ukrainian Insurgent Army. However, soon the regiment was liquidated by the German occupation authorities and Stupnytskyi switched to economic work.

In 1942–1943, he worked as the head of the public welfare department in Rivne.

From March 1943, together with his son Yuriy, he served in the Ukrainian Insurgent Army. From May 1943, he was the chief of staff of the Zagrava military district, had the pseudonym "Honcharenko", the organizer of the junior and senior UPA schools (in particular, "Druzhynniki"), the chief of staff of the UPA-North.

In August–December 1943, he led the insurgency in the North-Western Ukrainian lands, directing combat operations against the Germans.

During the roundup of the NKVD troops, he and his son were captured. Thanks to the change of his real name, disguised as his grandfather, Leonid Stupnytskyi managed to escape from the Enkavedists, but his son Yuriy was sentenced to 10 years in prison, even under a different name.

Danylo Shumuk (former member of the CPSU, UPA fighter, future dissident and prisoner of the Soviet camps) had the opportunity to meet with Leonid Stupnytskyi and ask a number of acute questions, including how to deal with the Bolsheviks: — So, the OUN raised the right cry: "With the Bolsheviks, the Bolshevik way!"- No, I am not a fan of such calls. Then the meaning of the struggle will disappear: we will resemble those with whom we are waging a struggle. The Japanese philosopher Umitura wrote: "Truth is divine and it was not proclaimed for the sake of the state at all. If we are unable to save the state, we can only make every effort to save the truth. If we preserve the truth, the state, even if it perishes, may be reborn again; if we deny the truth, then the state, even when it will prosper, will eventually perish. Love for the motherland includes loyalty to the truth to a much greater extent than loyalty to the state."

"I'm glad, and I'm very glad, that you think so," I said excitedly, "but in practice we're still moving towards a totalitarian type of organization."

"Yes, it's true," Stupnytskyi said affirmatively, "the OUN is a totalitarian organization." But today it is the only one capable of fighting the occupiers, and therefore we are forced to cooperate with it. In addition, working for the OUN, we simultaneously change its spirit, its face. We bring "fresh blood" into it, and all this will one day have its consequences."

He committed suicide to evade capture by the NKVD near the village of Derman, Zdolbuniv district, Rivne region.

On April 27, 1945, by the decision of the Ukrainian Main Liberation Council, he was posthumously promoted to the rank of lieutenant general of the UPA.

== Family ==
With the beginning of the German-Soviet war, his wife, mother-in-law and younger son Serhiy were deported to Kazakhstan.

Son Yuriy returned to Ukraine after ten years of imprisonment. In 1993, he looked for his brother Serhiy all the way to Warsaw. I learned from him that my mother died in exile in 1942, and my grandmother in 1944. Since Serhiy became homeless, he ended up in a Polish orphanage. After the war, the Polish government began to demand from the Soviet Union the repatriation of all Polish refugees to Poland. Serhiy went with them to the Szczecin Voivodeship. He graduated from an officer's school in Poland and worked at the Ministry of Foreign Affairs.

Yuriy Stupnytskyi lived in the city of Kremenets, under the strange surname of Kovalchuk. In 1992, he tried to return his real surname, but the court refused him.
