= Novohrodivka =

City in Donetsk Oblast, Ukraine

Novohrodivka Новогродівка
- City
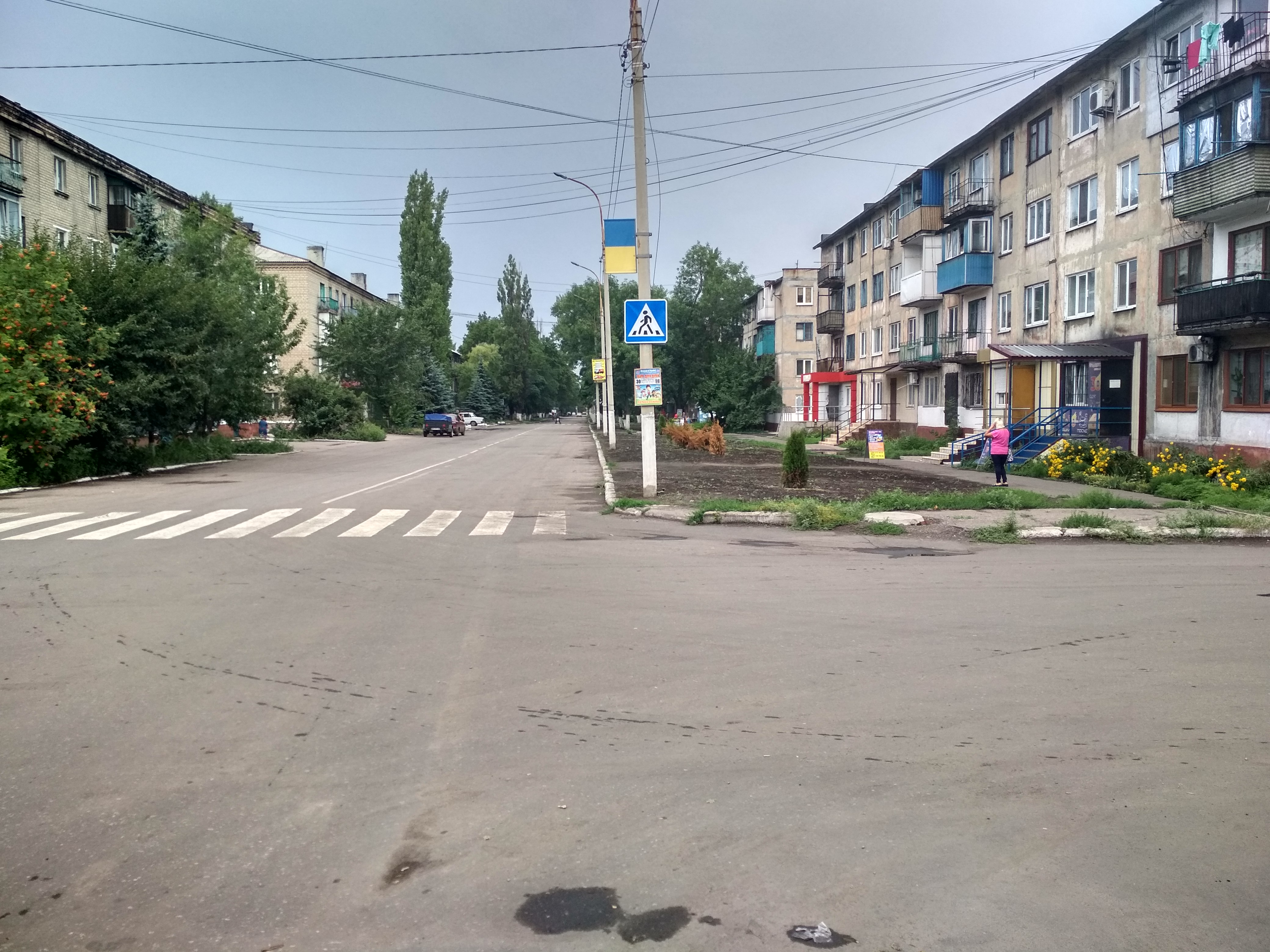
- Streets of Novohrodivka.

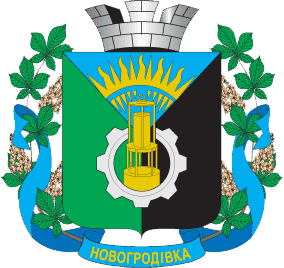
- Flag Coat of arms
- Interactive map of Novohrodivka
- Location of Novohrodivka Novohrodivka (Ukraine)
- Coordinates: 48°12′00″N 37°20′22″E
- Country: Ukraine
- Oblast: Donetsk Oblast
- Raion: Pokrovsk Raion
- Hromada: Novohrodivka urban hromada
- Founded: 1939
- City rights: 1958

Area
  - Total: 6 km^{2} (2.3 sq mi)

Population (2022)
  - Total: 14,037
  - Density: 2,300/km^{2} (6,100/sq mi)
- Climate: Dfb

Novohrodivka (Ukrainian: Новогродівка, IPA: [nowoˈɦrɔd⁽ʲ⁾iu̯kɐ]; Russian: Новогродовка, romanized: Novogrodovka) is a city in Pokrovsk Raion, Donetsk Oblast, Ukraine. It serves as the administrative center of Novohrodivka urban hromada. The city had a pre-war population of 14,037 (2022 estimate). The city has been under Russian occupation since August 2024.

It is located 45 kilometres (28 mi) from Donetsk and seven kilometres (4.3 mi) from Selydove.

== History ==
The settlement was founded in 1939 as Hrodivka with the construction of a coal mine. The settlement was occupied by Nazi Germany from October 1941 to September 1943 during World War II.

In 1950, it received the status of a workers' settlement and its current name. Novohrodivka received city status and its modern name in 1958.

It was a city of regional significance between June 26, 1992, to July 17, 2020. In 2020, Novohrodivka became part of Pokrovsk Raion and the administrative center of the newly formed Novohrodivka urban hromada.

=== Russian invasion of Ukraine ===
The city has repeatedly come under Russian strikes during the Russian invasion of Ukraine, causing damage to infrastructure and civilian casualties. In August 2024, amidst recent Russian advances in the area near Novohrodivka, the Donetsk Oblast Military Administration ordered the evacuation of 744 children and their families from the city.

On 16 August, during the ongoing Pokrovsk offensive, Russia was reportedly attempting to storm the city. By 19 August, the population had reportedly decreased to 1,500. On 22 August, Russian forces entered the city from the east. By 27 August, Russian forces occupied almost the entirety of the city, and by 28 August were widely reported to have fully captured it.

== Demographics ==
=== Population ===
Year	Population
1923	861
1927	1780
1959	14 296
1964	21 000
1970	22 902
1979	20 804
1989	19 429
1992	19 500
1994	20 000
1998	19 000
2002	17 473
2003	17 085
2004	16 822
2005	16 587
2006	16 438
2007	16 276
2008	16 168
2009	15 987
2010	15 824
2011	15 660
2012	15 560
2013	15 398
2014	15 247
2015	15 170
2016	15 027
2017	14 931
2018	14 758
2019	14 636
2020	14 481
2021	14 300

As of the 2001 Ukrainian census:

Ethnicity

- Ukrainians: 61.8%
- Russians: 33.9%
- Belarusians: 1.6%
- Tatars: 0.7%

Native language

- Russian: 69.20%
- Ukrainian: 29.84%
- Belarusian: 0.11%
- Armenian: 0.03%
- Moldovan: 0.03%
- Polish: 0.02%

== Economy ==
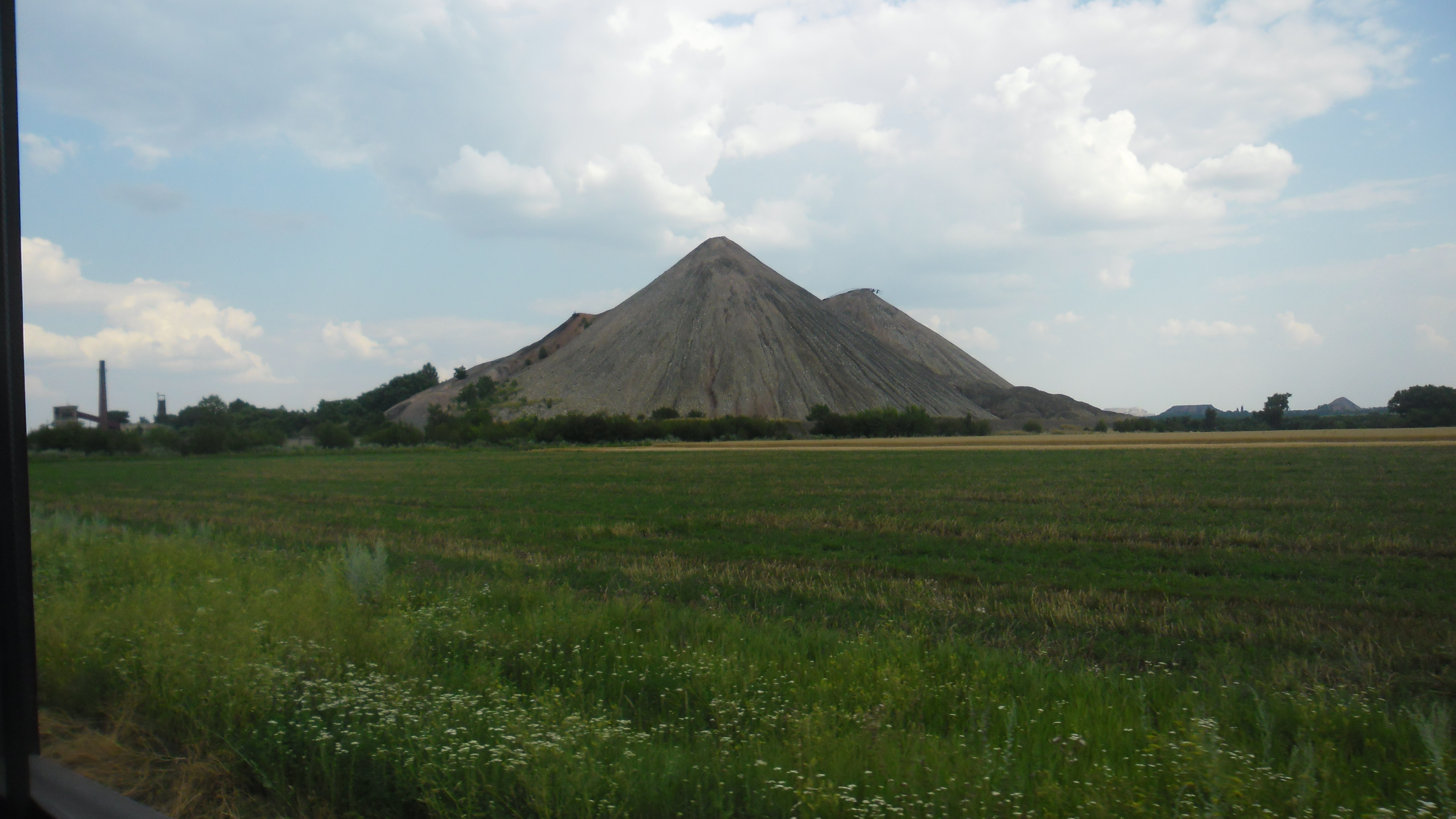
Novohrodivka mine.

The city is closely linked economically and historically to Selydove due to the integration of the surrounding mines into the Rossiya Group Coal Processing Plant, which extracts and processes 1.8 million tons of coal. The Novogrodovsky Machine-Building Plant is known for producing over 1 million DANI brand gas boilers.

The Rossiya Group Coal Processing Plant, with a group of mines producing and processing 1.8 million tons of coal, is located near the city.

The plant receives coal from the following mines: Rossiya Mine, Novogrodovskaya No. 2, Novogrodovskaya 1/3.

Novogrodovsk Machine-Building Plant is one of the leading manufacturers of gas boilers in Ukraine. More than 1 million gas boilers have been produced, which were also actively exported abroad. The plant has a history of over 40 years and was initially established as a branch of the Myasishchev Experimental Machine-Building Plant in Zhukovsky (Moscow Region) (aerospace engineering).

== Social services ==
=== Medicine ===
The city has a city hospital, which has been converted into a hospital. It can provide palliative care to patients with terminal illnesses or injuries. This is one of the first hospitals in the Donetsk region to establish palliative care units—inpatient and mobile.

=== Finances ===
As of 2003, goods exports amounted to $0.962 million, services produced amounted to UAH 1 million, the unemployment rate was 2.4%, and the average monthly salary was UAH 662.

=== Attractions ===
- Novogrodivskiy Palace of Culture (Tsentralna Street)
- Secondary Schools No. 8, 7, 9, and 10
- Music School No. 2

=== Education ===
There are 4 schools (1,799 students), 4 kindergartens (499 children), and 3 libraries.

=== Religion ===
In Novogrodovka there are churches of the Pokrovsk Deanery Donetsk Diocese Ukrainian Orthodox Church (Moscow Patriarchate): Holy Protection, Holy Barbara, and Holy Matrona of Moscow.

== Religion ==
In Novogrodovka there are churches of the Pokrovskoe Deanery Donetsk Diocese Ukrainian Orthodox Church (Moscow Patriarchate): Holy Protection, Holy Barbara, and Holy Matrona of Moscow

== Notable people ==
- Morgun Oleg Anatoliyovych (1971—2019) — captain of the State Emergency Service, sapper.
- Skakun Yaroslav Ivanovich (* 1949) — created a monument to T. G. Shevchenko for the city of Novogrodivka.
