= Memryk =

Memryk Мемрик
- Village
- Interactive map of Memryk
- Location of Memryk within Ukraine Memryk (Donetsk Oblast)
- Coordinates: 48°07′26″N 37°23′55″E
- Country: Ukraine
- Oblast: Donetsk Oblast
- Raion: Pokrovsk Raion
- Hromada: Novohrodivka urban hromada
- Founded: 1885
- Elevation: 201 m (659 ft)

Population (2001 census)
  - Total: 398
- Time zone: UTC+2 (EET)
  - Summer (DST): UTC+3 (EEST)
- Postal code: 85380
- Area code: +380 623
- KATOTTH: UA14160170100052886

Memryk (Ukrainian: Мемрик; Russian: Мемрик) is a village in Novohrodivka urban hromada, Pokrovsk Raion, Donetsk Oblast, eastern Ukraine. It is located 31.85 kilometres (19.79 mi) northwest by west (NWbW) from the centre of Donetsk city.

== History ==
Memryk was founded in 1885 under the Russian Empire.

=== Russian invasion of Ukraine ===
The village was captured by Russian Forces by the end of August 2024, during the Russian invasion of Ukraine.

== Demographics ==
As of the 2001 Ukrainian census, the settlement had 398 inhabitants, whose native languages were 38.44% Ukrainian, 60.80% Russian and 0.25% Moldovan (Romanian).
