= Mykolaivka, Hrodivka settlement hromada, Pokrovsk Raion, Donetsk Oblast =

Mykolaivka Миколаївка
- Village
- Interactive map of Mykolaivka
- Location of Mykolaivka within Ukraine Mykolaivka (Donetsk Oblast)
- Coordinates: 48°15′07″N 37°19′39″E
- Country: Ukraine
- Oblast: Donetsk Oblast
- Raion: Pokrovsk Raion
- Hromada: Hrodivka settlement hromada
- Elevation: 216 m (709 ft)

Population (2001 census)
  - Total: 91
- Time zone: UTC+2 (EET)
  - Summer (DST): UTC+3 (EEST)
- Postal code: 85345
- Area code: +380 623
- KATOTTH: UA14160050160024934

Mykolaivka (Ukrainian: Миколаївка; Russian: Николаевка) is a village in Hrodivka settlement hromada, Pokrovsk Raion, Donetsk Oblast, eastern Ukraine. It is located 43.58 kilometres (27.08 mi) northwest (NW) from the centre of Donetsk city.

== Geography ==
The village lies on the bank of the Zhuravka River, tributary of the Kazennyi Torets river. The absolute height is 216 metres above sea level.

== History ==
=== Russian invasion of Ukraine ===
The village came under attack of Russian Forces in October 2024, during the full-scale Russian invasion of Ukraine.

== Demographics ==
As of the 2001 Ukrainian census, the settlement had 91 inhabitants, whose native languages were 90.21% Ukrainian and 3.96% Russian.
