= Vesele, Hrodivka settlement hromada, Pokrovsk Raion, Donetsk Oblast =

Vesele Веселе
- Village
- Interactive map of Vesele
- Location of Vesele within Ukraine Vesele (Donetsk Oblast)
- Coordinates: 48.239444°N 37.437222°E
- Country: Ukraine
- Oblast: Donetsk Oblast
- Raion: Pokrovsk Raion
- Hromada: Hrodivka settlement hromada
- Elevation: 182 m (597 ft)

Population (2001 census)
  - Total: 129
- Time zone: UTC+2 (EET)
  - Summer (DST): UTC+3 (EEST)
- Postal code: 85350
- Area code: +380 623

Vesele (Ukrainian: Веселе; Russian: Весёлое) is a village in Hrodivka settlement hromada, Pokrovsk Raion, Donetsk Oblast, Ukraine, located 36.68 kilometres (22.79 mi) northwest by north (NWbN) from the centre of Donetsk city.

== History ==
=== Russian invasion ===
The settlement came under attack of Russian forces during the full-scale Russian invasion of Ukraine in July 2024. Several Russian sources claimed that Russian forces seized over half of the settlement by 29 July 2024 amidst recent advances in the area. On 1 August 2024, Russia fully captured the settlement.

== Demographics ==
As of the 2001 Ukrainian census, the settlement had 129 inhabitants, whose native languages were 68.42% Ukrainian and 31.58% Russian.
