= Ivanivka, Donetsk Oblast =

Ivanivka Іванівка
- Village
- Ivanivka shown within Ukraine Ivanivka shown within Donetsk
- Coordinates: 48°15′32″N 37°26′48″E
- Country: Ukraine
- Oblast: Donetsk Oblast
- Raion: Pokrovsk Raion
- Hromada: Hrodivka settlement hromada
- Elevation: 185 m (607 ft)

Population
  - Total: 669
- Postal code: 85350
- Area code: +380 623

Ivanivka (Ukrainian: Іванівка) is a village in Hrodivka settlement hromada, Pokrovsk Raion, Donetsk Oblast, Ukraine. The population was 669 according to the 2001 Ukrainian census.

== History ==
=== Russian invasion of Ukraine ===
As part of the Russian invasion of Ukraine, the village came under Russian pressure amid recent Russian territorial gains in the area around 25 July 2024. In early August, Russian forces began contesting the village, and captured it around 13 August.

== Demographics ==
According to the 2001 Ukrainian census, the population of the village was 669, of which 62.93% stated Ukrainian to be their native language, and 36.92% stated their native language to be Russian.
