= Krasnyi Yar, Pokrovsk Raion, Donetsk Oblast =

Krasnyi Yar Красний Яр
- Village
- Interactive map of Krasnyi Yar
- Location of Krasnyi Yar within Ukraine Krasnyi Yar (Donetsk Oblast)
- Coordinates: 48°14′30″N 37°20′20″E
- Country: Ukraine
- Oblast: Donetsk Oblast
- Raion: Pokrovsk Raion
- Hromada: Hrodivka settlement hromada
- Elevation: 171 m (561 ft)

Population (2001 census)
  - Total: 191
- Time zone: UTC+2 (EET)
  - Summer (DST): UTC+3 (EEST)
- Postal code: 85348
- Area code: +380 623
- KATOTTH: UA14160050120049714

Krasnyi Yar (Ukrainian: Красний Яр; Russian: Красный Яр) is a village in Hrodivka settlement hromada, Pokrovsk Raion, Donetsk Oblast, eastern Ukraine. It is located 42 kilometres (26 mi) northwest (NW) from the centre of Donetsk city.

== History ==
=== Russian invasion of Ukraine ===
The village was captured by Russian forces in October 2024, during the full-scale Russian invasion of Ukraine.

== Demographics ==
As of the 2001 Ukrainian census, the settlement had 191 inhabitants, whose native languages were 77.18% Ukrainian, 21.84% Russian and 0.97% Belarusian.
