= Prohres =

Prohres Прогрес
- Village
- Prohres shown within Ukraine Prohres shown within Donetsk
- Coordinates: 48°14′40″N 37°29′37″E
- Country: Ukraine (occupied by Russia)
- Oblast: Donetsk Oblast
- Raion: Pokrovsk Raion
- Hromada: Hrodivka settlement hromada
- Elevation: 211 m (692 ft)

Population
  - Total: 390
- Postal code: 85351
- Area code: +380 623

Prohres (Ukrainian: Прогрес; Russian: Прогресс) is a village in Hrodivka settlement hromada, Pokrovsk Raion, Donetsk Oblast, Ukraine. It is currently under Russian occupation. The population was 390 at the 2001 Ukrainian census.

== History ==
=== Russo-Ukrainian War ===
==== Russian invasion of Ukraine ====
The village has come under Russian airstrikes multiple times since the start of the Russian invasion of Ukraine. It came under Russian pressure on around 26 June 2024 amid recent Russian advancements in the area. On 18 July, it was entered by Russian forces, and was captured the following day. The seizure of the village was attributed to insufficient weapon supplies, deficient training, and decreased motivation. On 25 July, following further Russian advancements south of Prohres, two battalions of the Ukrainian 31st Mechanized Brigade were close to being encircled.

== Demographics ==
According to the 2001 Ukrainian census, the population of the village was 390 of which 44.1% stated Ukrainian to be their native language, and 54.62% stated their native language to be Russian.
