= Vovche, Donetsk Oblast =

Vovche Вовче
- Village
- Interactive map of Vovche
- Location of Vovche within Ukraine Vovche (Donetsk Oblast)
- Coordinates: 48.235°N 37.489444°E
- Country: Ukraine
- Oblast: Donetsk Oblast
- Raion: Pokrovsk Raion
- Hromada: Hrodivka settlement hromada
- Elevation: 187 m (614 ft)

Population (2001 census)
  - Total: 95
  - Estimate (2024): 7
- Time zone: UTC+2 (EET)
  - Summer (DST): UTC+3 (EEST)
- Postal code: 85351
- Area code: +380 623

Vovche (Ukrainian: Вовче; Russian: Волчье) is a village in Hrodivka settlement hromada, Pokrovsk Raion, Donetsk Oblast, Ukraine, located 33.39 kilometres (20.75 mi) northwest (NW) from the centre of Donetsk city.

== Geography ==
The village lies on the banks of the Vovcha river.

== History ==
=== Russian invasion ===
The settlement came under attack of Russian forces during the full-scale Russian invasion of Ukraine in July 2024. The Russian Ministry of Defence claimed that Russian Forces have seized the settlement by 29 July 2024.

== Demographics ==
As of the 2001 Ukrainian census, the settlement had 129 inhabitants, whose native languages were 83.50% Ukrainian and 16.50% Russian.
