= Dolynivka, Donetsk Oblast =

Dolynivka Долинівка
- Village
- Interactive map of Dolynivka
- Location of Dolynivka within Ukraine Dolynivka (Donetsk Oblast)
- Coordinates: 48°05′48″N 37°24′48″E
- Country: Ukraine
- Oblast: Donetsk Oblast
- Raion: Pokrovsk Raion
- Hromada: Novohrodivka urban hromada
- Founded: 1885
- Elevation: 181 m (594 ft)

Population (2001 census)
  - Total: 11
- Time zone: UTC+2 (EET)
  - Summer (DST): UTC+3 (EEST)
- Postal code: 85610
- Area code: +380 6278
- KATOTTH: UA14160170040028969

Dolynivka (Ukrainian: Долинівка; Russian: Долиновка) is a village in Novohrodivka urban hromada, Pokrovsk Raion, Donetsk Oblast, eastern Ukraine. It is located 29.9 kilometres (18.6 mi) west by north (WbN) from the centre of Donetsk city.

== History ==
The settlement was founded in 1885.

On November 7 1917, in accordance with the Third Universal of the Ukrainian Central Rada, it became part of the Ukrainian People's Republic.

=== Russian invasion of Ukraine ===
The village came under attack of Russian Forces by the end of August 2024, during the full-scale Russian invasion of Ukraine.

== Demographics ==
As of the 2001 Ukrainian census, the settlement had 11 inhabitants, whose native languages were 27.27% Ukrainian and 72.73% Russian.
