= Kozatske, Pokrovsk Raion, Donetsk Oblast =

Village in Donetsk Oblast, Ukraine

Kozatske Козацьке
- Village
- Interactive map of Kozatske
- Location of Kozatske within Donetsk Oblast Kozatske (Ukraine)
- Coordinates: 48°16′47″N 37°18′39″E
- Country: Ukraine
- Oblast: Donetsk Oblast
- Raion: Pokrovsk Raion
- Hromada: Hrodivka settlement hromada
- Elevation: 171 m (561 ft)

Population (2001 census)
  - Total: 165
- Time zone: UTC+2 (EET)
  - Summer (DST): UTC+3 (EEST)
- Postal code: 85320
- Area code: +380 623
- KATOTTH: UA14160050210094383

Kozatske (Ukrainian: Козацьке), formerly known as Moskovske (Ukrainian: Московське) is a village in Hrodivka settlement hromada in Pokrovsk Raion (district) in Donetsk Oblast of eastern Ukraine.

== History ==
In 2024 the Verkhovna Rada renamed the village as a part of the derussification campaign.

== Demographics ==
Native language as of the Ukrainian Census of 2001:

- Ukrainian 44.21%
- Russian 55.79%
