= Ptyche, Donetsk Oblast =

Ptyche Птиче
- Rural settlement
- Interactive map of Ptyche
- Location of Ptyche within Ukraine Ptyche (Donetsk Oblast)
- Coordinates: 48°10′00″N 37°27′24″E
- Country: Ukraine
- Oblast: Donetsk Oblast
- Raion: Pokrovsk Raion
- Hromada: Novohrodivka urban hromada
- Elevation: 208 m (682 ft)

Population (2001 census)
  - Total: 276
- Time zone: UTC+2 (EET)
  - Summer (DST): UTC+3 (EEST)
- Postal code: 85382
- Area code: +380 623
- KATOTTH: UA14160170150041655

Ptyche (Ukrainian: Птиче; Russian: Птичье) is a rural settlement (selyshche) in Pokrovsk Raion of Donetsk Oblast in eastern Ukraine. It belongs to Novohrodivka urban hromada.

== History ==
=== Russian invasion of Ukraine ===
The settlement was captured by Russian Forces in August 2024.

== Demographics ==
As of the 2001 Ukrainian census, the settlement had 276 inhabitants, whose native languages were 60.22% Ukrainian, 39.42% Russian and 0.36%.
