= Komyshivka, Donetsk Oblast =

Urban locality in Donetsk Oblast, Ukraine

Komyshivka Комишівка
- Rural settlement
- Interactive map of Komyshivka
- Location of Komyshivka within Donetsk Oblast#Location of Komyshivka within Ukraine Komyshivka (Ukraine)
- Coordinates: 48°10′49″N 37°28′08″E
- Country: Ukraine
- Oblast: Donetsk Oblast
- Raion: Pokrovsk Raion
- Hromada: Novohrodivka urban hromada
- Elevation: 182 m (597 ft)

Population (2022)
  - Total: 373
- Time zone: UTC+2 (EET)
  - Summer (DST): UTC+3 (EEST)
- Postal code: 85482
- Area code: +380 6237

Komyshivka (Ukrainian: Комишівка) is a rural settlement in Novohrodivka urban hromada, Pokrovsk Raion, Donetsk Oblast, eastern Ukraine. The population is 373 (2022 estimate).

== Demographics ==
Native language as of the Ukrainian Census of 2001:

- Ukrainian 23.57%
- Russian 75.36%
- Belarusian 0.54%
