= Battle in Shakhtarsk Raion =

2014 Ukraine-Russia battle

- Part of the war in Donbas
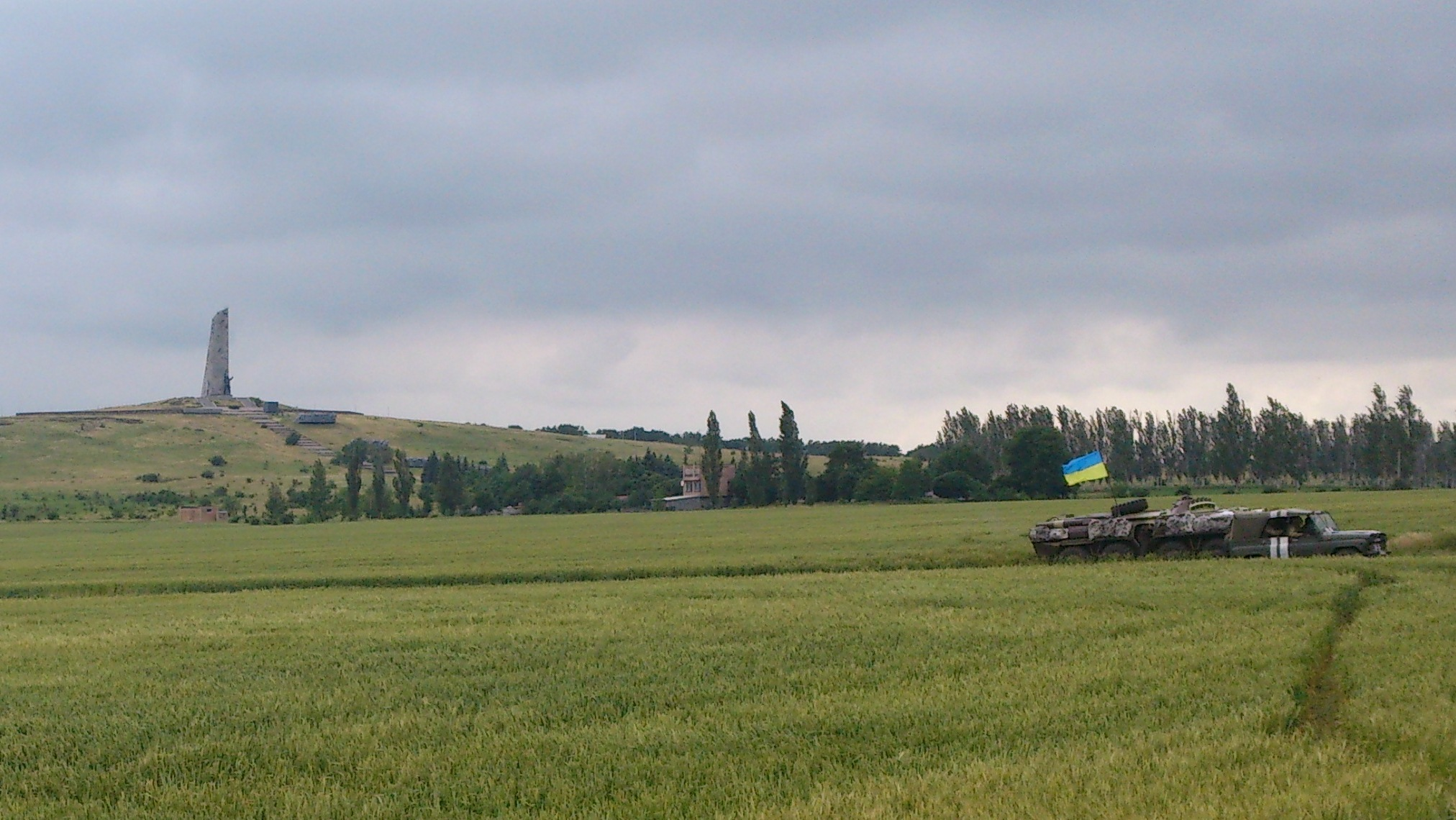
- Ukrainian troops at Savur-Mohyla, June 2014
Date	16 July – 26 August 2014 (1 month, 1 week and 3 days)
Location	Shakhtarsk Raion, Donetsk Oblast, Ukraine
Result	DPR victory: Shootdown of Malaysia Airlines Flight 17; DPR forces recapture Savur-Mohyla

Belligerents
Ukraine	Donetsk People's Republic Russia (Denied by Russia)

Commanders and leaders
(Ukraine) Viktor Muzhenko (Ukraine) Timur Yuldashev †	Alexander Zakharchenko; Igor Girkin

Units involved
Armed Forces of Ukraine; Ukrainian Ground Forces; 17th OTBr; 28th OMBr; 30th OMBr; 72nd OMBr; OPBr; Ukrainian Air Assault Forces; 79th ODShBr; 95th OAEMBr; 25th OPDBr; Ukrainian Air Force; Internal Affairs Ministry: National Guard; Azov Battalion; Right Sector: Ukrainian Volunteer Corps	Donbass People's Militia: Oplot Battalion; Vostok Battalion; Russian volunteers; Russian Armed Forces (from 24 August)

Casualties and losses
Unknown	Unknown
- One civilian plane shot down, 298 civilians killed

The Battle in Shakhtarsk Raion began on 16 July 2014, when the Armed Forces of Ukraine attempted to cut off the Russian backed separatists’ supply lines from Russia. Fighting broke out around the towns of Marynivka, Dmytrivka, Stepanivka, Shakhtarsk, as well as the strategic hill of Savur-Mohyla. It later spread to the cities of Snizhne and Torez. While the battle was in progress, a civilian passenger airliner, Malaysia Airlines Flight 17, was shot down near Hrabove on 17 July. Amidst a wide counter-offensive by the Donbas rebel forces and their Russian backers across Donbas, government troops were forced out of Shakhtarsk Raion on 26 August.

== Events by location ==
From 6 April, as part of the rising unrest in Ukraine in the aftermath of the 2014 Ukrainian revolution, Russian backed separatists affiliated with the Donetsk People's Republic (DPR) captured towns and cities across Donetsk Oblast, including Shakhtarsk Raion. The raion is in a crucial position between the Donetsk and Lugansk People's Republics, and Russia. Ukrainian government forces launched an offensive against pro-Russian forces in Donetsk and Luhansk oblasts of Ukraine on 7 April, resulting in the war in Donbas. War reached Shakhtarsk Raion on 16 July, after separatists retreated from most of northern Donetsk Oblast. Fighting took place across the raion, in an attempt by the government to cut-off insurgent supply lines, and to reach the crash site of the civilian Malaysia Airlines Flight 17 which had been shot down by pro-Russian forces.

=== Stepanivka ===
DPR-affiliated separatists launched an offensive on neighbouring government-controlled Marynivka from village of Stepanivka on 16 July. Ukrainian forces said that they retook Stepanivka from the insurgents on 29 July, and then advanced towards nearby Pervomaisk. According to an 11 August report, the village appeared to have been almost completely destroyed by shelling during the fighting across the raion. Stepanivka returned to insurgent control on 14 August.

=== Marynivka ===
Marynivka is a border town located in the southern Donetsk Oblast. Its position on the border made control of it important to maintaining insurgent supply-lines. Insurgents launched an offensive on National Guard of Ukraine positions in the town on 16 July, after breaking through encirclement by government forces in neighbouring Stepanivka. Fighting also spread to the nearby village of Tarany. During this offensive, the insurgents used tanks, mortars, and anti-tank missiles against government forces. Insurgents held Marynivka until the National Guard was able to repel their offensive and force them to retreat to Stepanivka. Later on, the insurgents said that had recaptured Marynivka. Insurgent spokesman Sergei Kavtaradze said that one insurgent had been killed, while fifteen were injured. Insurgent commander Igor Girkin said that DPR insurgents destroyed two Ukrainian armoured vehicles and captured one.

Ukrainian forces came under continued attack by the insurgents in Marynivka, despite managing to hold onto control of it on 16 July. On the day after the first insurgent offensive, government forces repelled another four attacks, and destroyed three tanks, two armoured personnel carriers, and two other combat vehicles. Mortar fire from Russia rained down on the Marynivka border crossing on 25 July. Government forces said they shot down at least three Russian unmanned aerial vehicles on the same day. Insurgents said that they left the area on 31 July, after near-constant fighting with government forces. Despite this, Ukrainian positions in and around Marynivka were shelled by Grad rockets and mortars on 1 August.

On 7 August separatist and Russian volunteer forces attacked Ukrainian positions in the area of Marynivka and Stepanivka. On 12 August, supported by two T-72 tanks, they attacked positions of the Ukrainian 30th Brigade near the village of Nykyforove. After reaching Snizhne and uniting with the local garrison, on 13 August the separatist troops attacked Stepanivka, forcing Ukrainian troops there to retreat. One battalion of the brigade remained encircled in the area of Bokove-Platove, but was rescued by a raid conducted by Ukrainian forces stationed in Lutuhyne. Insurgents launched a new offensive on Marynivka on 14 August and captured the town after fierce fighting with government forces in the vicinity of the border crossing.

=== Savur-Mohyla ===
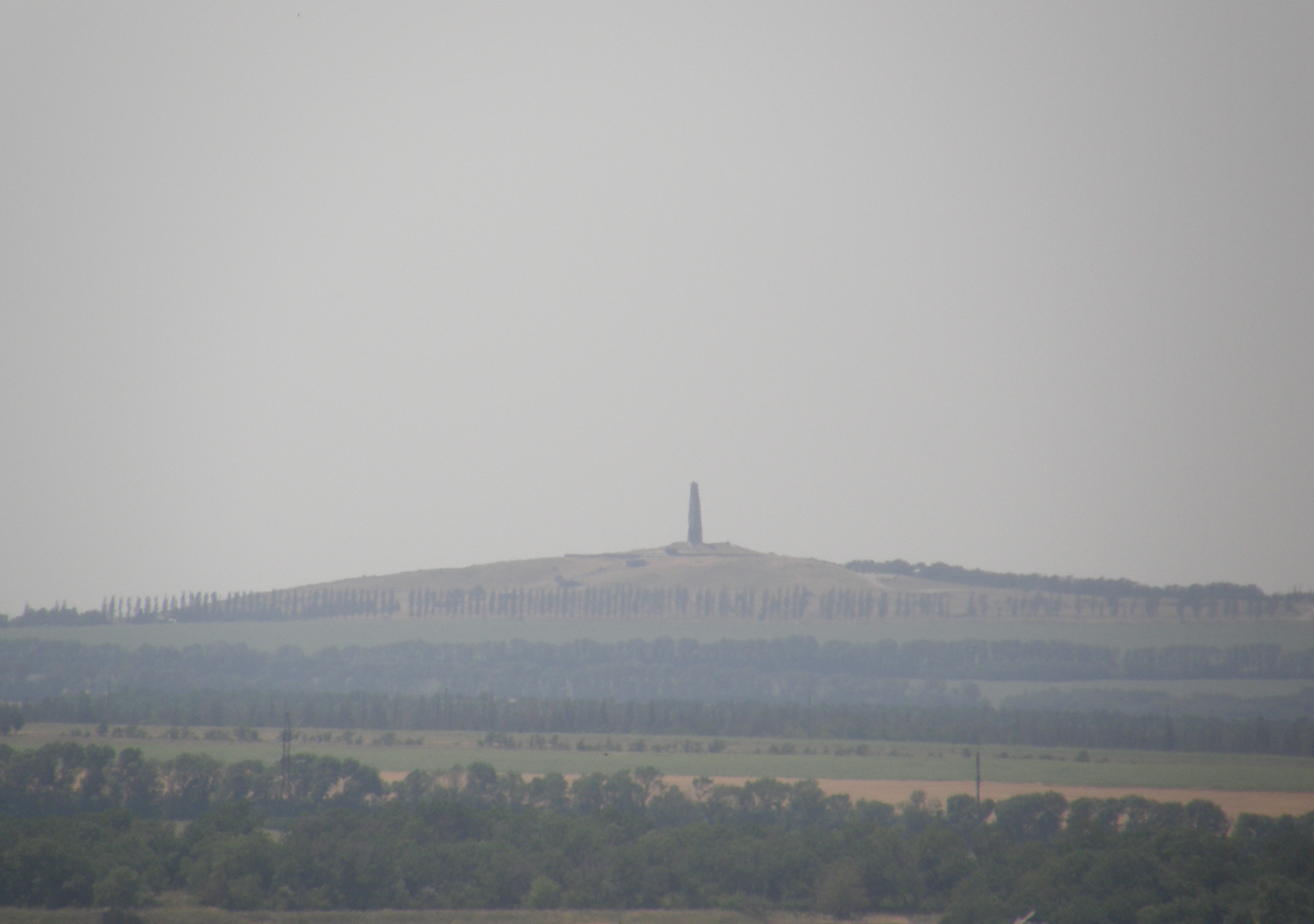
The strategic hill Savur-Mohyla, as seen from Snizhne. Insurgents used the hill to shell government positions in Marynivka

Savur-Mohyla is a strategically important hill near the Russia–Ukraine border, and overlooks the villages of Dmytrivka and Marynivka. DPR-affiliated insurgents used the hill to shell the government-controlled village of Marynivka on 16 July, amidst an offensive by the insurgents on that village. In response, the Air Force of Ukraine attacked insurgents positions on the hill, whilst the insurgents tried to repel this attack by firing anti-aircraft guns at Air Force aeroplanes. Government forces that were encircled near the hill tried to break out of encirclement and rout the insurgents on it. Ukrainian fighter jets were shot down near the hill on 23 July. A report by the Ukrainian government said that the shoot-downs were caused by missiles fired from Russia. Insurgent commander Igor Girkin said that DPR fighters shot down one of the planes, and that the pilot ejected. Ukrainian forces said that they retook the hill on 28 July. As a result, a corridor was created to resupply units that were trapped nearby. Intense fighting in the area continued on 31 July.

Insurgents attacked Ukrainian positions on the hill from the nearby city of Snizhne on 5 August. A spokesman for the National Security and Defence Council of Ukraine said on 6 August that Ukrainian forces on Savur-Mohyla had come into contact with pro-Russian insurgents twenty-five times in the past twenty-four hours. On 16 August separatist forces and Russian volunteers captured the border checkpoint of Uspenka and began shelling Ukrainian positions in Amvrosiivka. On 19-20 August a column of separatist forces attacked Ukrainian positions between Savur-Mohyla and Petrovske, taking several dozens of prisoners. On 24 August the remaining Ukrainian troops left Amvrosiivka. Following the entry of Russian regular army into Ukraine, a wide counter-offensive by insurgent forces across the Donbas resulted in the recapture of Savur-Mohyla by DPR-affiliated units on 26 August.

=== Malaysia Airlines Flight 17 ===
Malaysia Airlines Flight 17 was a scheduled international passenger flight from Amsterdam to Kuala Lumpur that was shot down by Russian-controlled forces with a surface-to-air missile near Hrabove, about 10 kilometres (6 1/4 mi) from Shakhtarsk, on 17 July. All 283 passengers and 15 crew died in the shoot-down.

=== Shakhtarsk ===
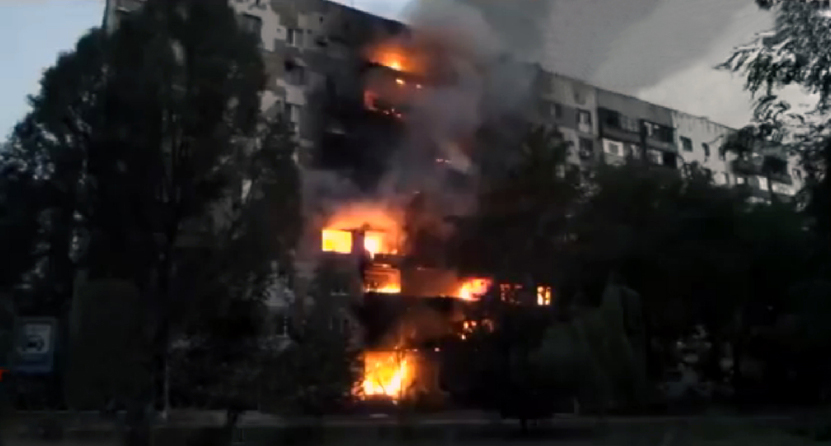
Burning block of flats in Shakhtarsk, 3 August 2014

According to Ukrainian military analyst Dmytro Tymchuk, capture of Shakhtarsk by Ukrainian forces would a necessary condition for disrupting communications between "DPR" and "LPR" along the H21 route.

According to DPR forces, a National Guard convoy entered Shakhtarsk from the north on 27 July. Air raid sirens were heard, heavy fighting erupted, and street battles took place across the city. Insurgents attacked government forces from the south, but later retreated. Reinforcements from neighbouring Snizhne arrived to assist the embattled DPR insurgents. Subsequently, the Armed Forces of Ukraine said that they had captured Shakhtarsk.

On 30 July a battallion of the 25th Airborne Brigade advancing from Debaltseve captured an outpost of the militants on the western outskirts of Shakhtarsk. Simultaneously, forces of the 95th Air Assault Brigade advanced towards Torez and Snizhne. Following several days of heavy street battles, units of the 25th Brigade found themselves isolated by insurgents, who used residential buildings to correct their fire. Together with elements of the 17th Tank Brigade, the battallion managed to break through the enemy lines and reached Blahodatne, losing two armoured vehicles in the process. In the aftermath, the 1st Battallion of 25th Brigade took part in the storming of Savur-Mohyla.

On 1 August the DPR-affiliated insurgents said they had reasserted control over the city, and pushed Ukrainian forces to its outskirts. They also said that a large amount of Ukrainian equipment was destroyed in the fighting. An insurgent ambush killed ten Ukrainian soldiers on 31 July. According to Ukrainian officials, mortars were used to attack the troops as they were re-deploying.

By 2 August, Ukrainian forces had entered the peripherial areas of Shakhtarsk after performing artillery strikes against militants' positions in the city. Fierce clashes between government and insurgent forces continued in early August. Many civilians left their homes to escape the fighting, and whilst those that remained became emotionally distressed because of constant overnight artillery bombardment. Organization for Security and Co-operation in Europe (OSCE) monitors visited Shakhtarsk on 8 August. They said that the town was "deserted", and that no shops were open. According to local residents, water was only available for two hours a day, and electrical power and gas service were non-existent. There was damage from shelling across the town, and multiple residential buildings were seen destroyed.

By mid-August, Ukrainian command had reported several times on the disruption of communications between militants on the borders of Donetsk and Luhansk regions. However, clashes in the area of Shakhtarsk continued. In late August militants continued to fend off attempts by government forces to remove them from the city.

=== Snizhne and Torez ===
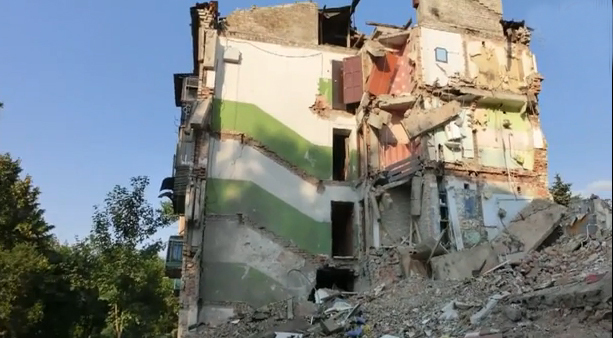
Damaged building in Snizhne, 6 August 2014

Snizhne and Torez are cities that are geographically located in the Shakhtarsk Raion, but which are administered separately. Violence had occurred in Snizhne prior to the battle, including a rocket attack by an aeroplane on 15 July that killed at least eleven people and damaged many homes. Ukrainian forces said they entered Torez and other nearby villages on 28 July.

They managed to hold the town only briefly, as DPR-affiliated insurgents forced them to withdraw from the area on 1 August. Clashes on the outskirts of the city continued on 7 August, after Ukrainian soldiers tried to relieve their encircled comrades near the town. According to the DPR, these attacks were repelled. Ukrainian forces advanced toward Torez again on 8 August, in an effort to prevent insurgent attacks on their positions at Savur-Mohyla.

Ukrainian forces launched a new offensive with the aim of recapturing Snizhne, Torez and Shakhtarsk on 12 August. Clashes continued in each city. On the next day, Ukrainian artillery destroyed a convoy of lorries filled with ammunition for the insurgents at Snizhne. According to two members of the Russian Presidential Human Rights Council, this convoy had been escorted by Russian military personnel, of which more than 100 were killed and about 300 wounded. Government forces tried once again to retake Torez from the insurgents on 20 August, but were repelled. Ukrainian forces destroyed eleven Grad rocket systems, three tanks, and five armoured vehicles used by the insurgents in Snizhne on 21 August. Government sources said that they also killed more than 100 Russian "mercenaries".

=== Ukrainian withdrawal ===
As a result of systematic cross-border shelling by Russian forces, sometime after 21 August troops of the 28th Mechanized Brigade were withdrawn from the areas of Marynivka, Saurivka and Hryhorivka towards Kuteinykove near Ilovaisk. On 24 August units stationed in the area were subjected to Sector B commander Ruslan Khomchak. After suffering from another Russian cross-border shelling in Starobesheve, Ukrainian troops retreated from the area, leaving the ATO zone.

== Aftermath ==
During early September 2014, 18 bodies of Ukrainian soldiers were recovered in the area of Savur-Mohyla by civilian volunteers. On 11 September the National Security and Defence Council of Ukraine recognized, that Ukraine had lost control over border areas in the eastern part of Donetsk Oblast.

== See also ==
- Outline of the Russo-Ukrainian War
