= Blahodatne, Donetsk Oblast =

Blahodatne is a frequently occurring placename in Ukraine. Blahodatne, Donetsk Oblast may refer to several places in the Donetsk Oblast:

- Blahodatne, Bakhmut Raion, Donetsk Oblast
- Blahodatne, Amvrosiivka urban hromada, Donetsk Raion, Donetsk Oblast
- Blahodatne, Khartsyzk urban hromada, Donetsk Raion, Donetsk Oblast
- Blahodatne, Olhynka settlement hromada, Volnovakha Raion, Donetsk Oblast
- Blahodatne, Velyka Novosilka settlement hromada, Volnovakha Raion, Donetsk Oblast
- Zhelanne, formally renamed Blahodatne by the Verkhovna Rada in September 2024
