= Novohnativka =

Novohnativka Новогнатівка
- Village
- Interactive map of Novohnativka
- Location of Novohnativka within Ukraine Novohnativka (Ukraine)
- Coordinates: 47°32′28″N 37°46′48″E
- Country: Ukraine
- Oblast: Donetsk Oblast
- Raion: Volnovakha Raion
- Hromada: Olhynka settlement hromada
- Elevation: 147 m (482 ft)

Population (2001 census)
  - Total: 722
- Time zone: UTC+2 (EET)
  - Summer (DST): UTC+3 (EEST)
- Postal code: 85734
- Area code: +380 6244

Novohnativka (Ukrainian: Новогнатівка; Russian: Новогнатовка) is a village in Volnovakha Raion (district) in Donetsk Oblast of eastern Ukraine, at 53 km SSW from the centre of Donetsk city. Novohnativka is administratively subordinated to village council of Mykolaivka.

== Russo-Ukrainian War ==
During the War in Donbass, in February 2016, an attempt was made by two groups of pro-Russian scouts to attack Ukrainian forces from the direction of Dokuchaievsk along the Novotroitske-Mykolaivka–Novohnativka stretch.

The village has been under the Russian occupation since February 24, 2022, when DPR's 1st Separate Guards Motorized Rifle Brigade took over the settlement and two other nearby villages of Bohdanivka and Mykolaivka in the Volnovakha urban hromada.

== Demographics ==
According to census of 1897 the population of the settlement was 1089. According to Ukrainian Census of 2001 the population of the village was 722, native language of whom was as follows:

- Ukrainian 19.53%
- Russian 78.53%
- Moldovan (Romanian) 0.83%
- Armenian 0.55%
