= Blagodatnoye =

Blagodatnoye (Russian: Благодатное) may refer to several places in Russia:

== Rural localities ==
- Blagodatnoye, Korenevsky District, Kursk Oblast, a selo
- Blagodatnoye, Kurchatovsky District, Kursk Oblast, a village
- Blagodatnoye, Medvensky District, Kursk Oblast, a village
- Blagodatnoye, Lipetsk Oblast, a village
- Blagodatnoye, Novosibirsk Oblast, a selo
- Blagodatnoye, Oryol Oblast, a village
- Blagodatnoye, Primorsky Krai, a selo
- Blagodatnoye, Saratov Oblast, a selo
- Blagodatnoye, Smolensk Oblast, a village
- Blagodatnoye, Stavropol Krai, a selo
- Blagodatnoye, Tyumen Oblast, a village
- Blagodatnoye, Udmurtia, a village
- Blagodatnoye, Khabarovsk Krai, a selo

== Other ==
- Blagodatnoye (air base), a former Soviet airbase in Khabarovsk Krai
- Blagodatnoye mine, a gold mine in Khabarovsk Krai

== See also ==
- Благодатное, a more comprehensive list in Russian-language Wikipedia
- Blahodatne (disambiguation), localities in Ukraine
