= Blahodatne =

Blahodatne (Ukrainian: Благодатне) may refer to several places in Ukraine:

== Cherkasy Oblast ==
- Blahodatne, Cherkasy Oblast, village in Zolotonosha Raion

== Crimea ==
- Blahodatne, Crimea

== Dnipropetrovsk Oblast ==
- Blahodatne, Kamianske Raion, Dnipropetrovsk Oblast
- Blahodatne, Kryvyi Rih Raion, Dnipropetrovsk Oblast

== Donetsk Oblast ==
- Blahodatne, Bakhmut Raion, Donetsk Oblast
- Blahodatne, Amvrosiivka urban hromada, Donetsk Raion, Donetsk Oblast
- Blahodatne, Khartsyzk urban hromada, Donetsk Raion, Donetsk Oblast
- Blahodatne, Olhynka settlement hromada, Volnovakha Raion, Donetsk Oblast
- Blahodatne, Velyka Novosilka settlement hromada, Volnovakha Raion, Donetsk Oblast
- Zhelanne, formally renamed Blahodatne by the Verkhovna Rada in September 2024

== Kharkiv Oblast ==
- Blahodatne, Krasnokutsk settlement hromada, Bohodukhiv Raion, Kharkiv Oblast
- Blahodatne, Valky urban hromada, Bohodukhiv Raion, Kharkiv Oblast
- Blahodatne, Vovchansk urban hromada, Bohodukhiv Raion, Kharkiv Oblast
- Blahodatne, Kharkiv Raion, Kharkiv Oblast
- Blahodatne, Lozova Raion, Kharkiv Oblast
- Blahodatne, Zmiiv urban hromada, Chuhuiv Raion, Kharkiv Oblast

== Kherson Oblast ==
- Blahodatne, Beryslav Raion, Kherson Oblast
- Blahodatne, Henichesk Raion, Kherson Oblast
- Blahodatne, Kakhovka Raion, Kherson Oblast
- Blahodatne, Kherson Raion, Kherson Oblast
- Blahodatne, Skadovsk Raion, Kherson Oblast

== Kirovohrad Oblast ==
- Blahodatne, Hurivka rural hromada, Kropyvnytskyi Raion, Kirovohrad Oblast
- Blahodatne, Ketrysanivka rural hromada, Kropyvnytskyi Raion, Kirovohrad Oblast

== Luhansk Oblast ==
- Blahodatne, Luhansk Oblast

== Mykolaiv Oblast ==
- Blahodatne, Mykolaiv urban hromada, Mykolaiv Raion, Mykolaiv Oblast
- Blahodatne, Ochakiv urban hromada, Mykolaiv Raion, Mykolaiv Oblast
- Blahodatne, Pervomaisk Raion, Mykolaiv Oblast
- Blahodatne, Pervomaiske settlement hromada, Mykolaiv Raion, Mykolaiv Oblast

== Odesa Oblast ==
- Blahodatne, Plakhtiivka rural hromada, Bilhorod-Dnistrovskyi Raion, Odesa Oblast
- Blahodatne, Shabo rural hromada, Bilhorod-Dnistrovskyi Raion, Odesa Oblast
- Blahodatne, Bolhrad Raion, Odesa Oblast
- Blahodatne, Odesa Raion, Odesa Oblast
- Blahodatne, Podilsk Raion, Odesa Oblast
- Blahodatne, Rozdilna Raion, Odesa Oblast

== Vinnytsia Oblast ==
- Blahodatne, Vinnytsia Oblast

== Volyn Oblast ==
- Blahodatne, Volyn Oblast

== Zaporizhzhia Oblast ==
- Blahodatne, Tokmak Raion, Zaporizhzhia Oblast

== See also ==
- Blagodatnoye (disambiguation), localities in Russia
