= Andrii Ponomarov =

Ukrainian politician (born 1961)

- Андрій Пономарьов
- A photo of him from 2014.

People's Deputy of Ukraine
- In office 12 December 2012 – 27 November 2014
- Constituency: Donetsk Oblast, No. 61

Personal details
- Born: Andrii Viktorovich Ponomarov; 2 July 1961 (age 65) Dokuchaievsk, Ukrainian SSR, Soviet Union
- Party: Party of Regions (2012-2014)
- Education: Dnipro Polytechnic (1985)

Andrii Viktorovich Ponomarov (Ukrainian: Андрій Вікторович Пономарьов; born 2 July 1961) is a Ukrainian politician and miner who served as a People's Deputy of Ukraine in the Verkhovna Rada representing the 7th convocation from 2012 to its premature end in 2014 with the Party of Regions.

== Early life ==
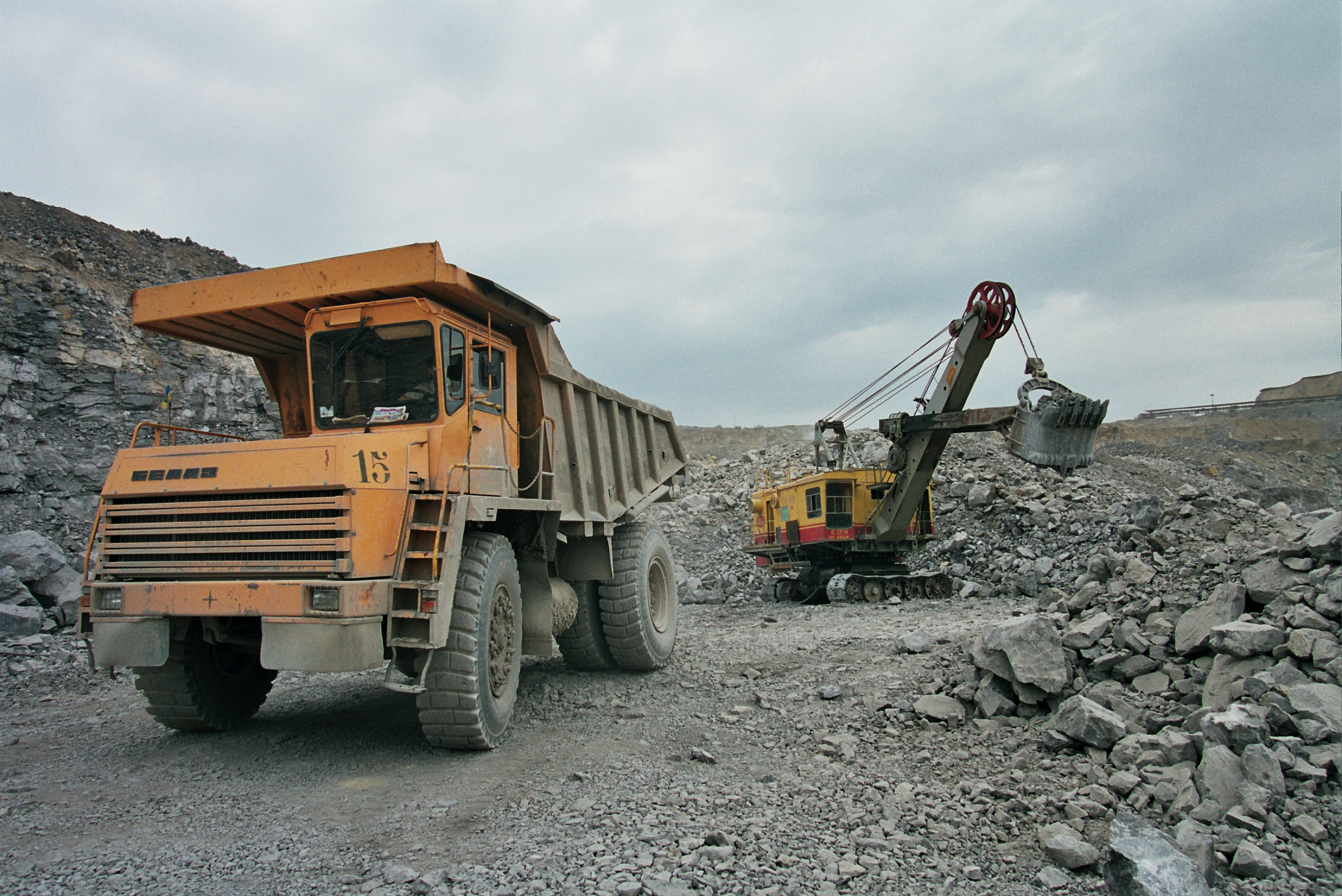
A quarry of the Dokuchaievsk flux and dolomite plant (DFDK). Ponomarov spent most of his career at DFDK, and eventually became its director in 1999.

Ponomarov was born on 2 July 1961 in the city of Dokuchaievsk, in what was then the Ukrainian SSR of the Soviet Union. He is the son of a third-generation family of miners, and after graduating from the 10th grade at Dokuchaievsk Secondary School No. 4 in 1978, he immediately starting working. He worked at the flux and dolomite plant in his hometown under 1980, when he pursued higher education, graduating from the Dnipro Polytechnic in 1985 with a qualification as a mining engineer. Afterwards, he returned to the dolomite plant in Dokuchaievsk, where he worked as a mine dispatcher, then mine foreman, and then shift supervisor. Later that year, he began working as head of the Stylsky quarry, and he also later headed the Vostochny quarry until 1995. Ponomarov returned to the dolomite plant (DFDK) as Deputy General Director in 1995, and in 1999 he began heading it. In 2003, he became qualified as a Candidate of Sciences with a thesis in the specialty of physical processes of mining production.

== Political career ==
In 2002, he was elected as a deputy to the Donetsk Oblast Council. He was continuously re-elected for multiple terms until 2012, when he resigned to run in the 2012 Ukrainian parliamentary elections with the Party of Regions in constituency No. 61. At the time of its formation in 2012, the constituency consisted of the cities of Dokuchaievsk and Snizhne alongside parts of the Amvrosiivka Raion and Starobesheve Raion. He was elected without much controversy with 54.76% of the vote (45,367 people) against the Communist Party of Ukraine candidate Mykola Kravchenko, who won 21.59% of the vote (17,890 people). Upon joining the Rada, he became a member of the Party of Regions faction and was appointed Secretary of the Committee on Economic Policy. His term went by mostly uneventfully initially, although he was alleged to have piano voted during the law on amnesty for protestors during Euromaidan, specifically for Nikolai Levchenko. After the War in the Donbas started, despite the fact that his entire constituency had become occupied by the pro-Russian Donetsk People's Republic, Ponomarev publicly said there was no need to dig trenches on the border with Russia. He also declared his loyalty to Viktor Yanukovych during the same interview in Amvrosiivka. After the subsequent declaration of the snap 2014 Ukrainian parliamentary elections, he attempted to run again as a self-nominated candidate in constituency No. 61, although he was ultimately not selected because elections could not be held there.

== Personal life ==
He is married and has three daughters.

== Honours and awards ==
Ponomarov has been awarded the following honours and awards:

- Order "For Labour Achievements", IV degree (2002)
- Honored Work of the Industry of Ukraine (2002)
- Order of Merit, III degree (2004)
- Honorary Diploma of the Verkhovna Rada of Ukraine (2007)
- Order of Merit, II degree (2011)
