= Kopani, Donetsk Raion, Donetsk Oblast =

Kopani Копані Войковський Voikovskyi
- Rural settlement
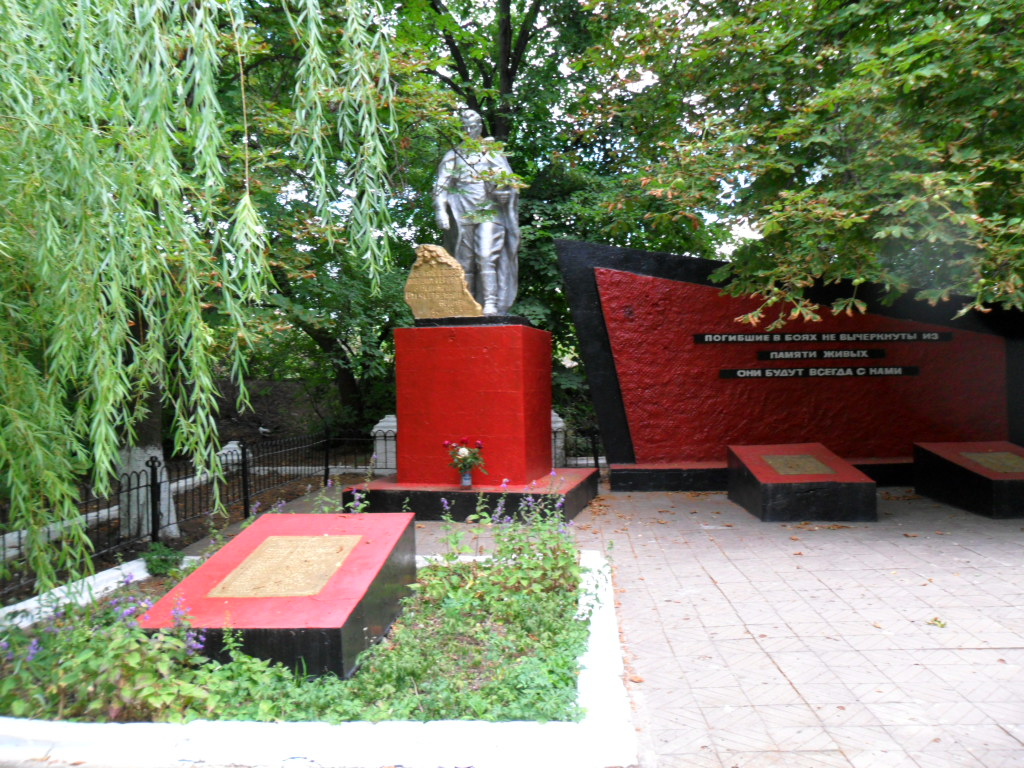
- World War II memorial in Voikovskyi

- Location within Donetsk Oblast Location within Ukraine
- Coordinates: 47.7594°N 38.3375°E
- Country: Ukraine
- Oblast: Donetsk Oblast
- Raion: Donetsk Raion
- Hromada: Amvrosiivka urban hromada

Population (2022)
  - Total: 1,102
- Time zone: UTC+2 (EET)
  - Summer (DST): UTC+3 (EEST)
- Postal Code: 87351

Kopani (Ukrainian: Копані) or Voikovskyi (Ukrainian: Войковський; Russian: Войковский) is a rural settlement in Amvrosiivka urban hromada, Donetsk Raion (district) in Donetsk Oblast of Ukraine. Its population is 1,102 (2022 estimate).

== Geography ==
The town is located on the Sukhyi Yalanchyk river, a tributary of the Mokryi Yalanchyk. It is located 8 kilometres (5.0 mi) from the railway station at Kuteinykove, and 18 kilometres (11 mi) southwest from Amvrosiivka.

== History ==
=== 19th and 20th century ===
The town was originally established in the late 19th century, under the name Kopani. It grew up around a local brick factory. In 1922, the factory had 150 employees, and an annual production capacity of 700,000 bricks.

In the Soviet Union, Kopani was included in Amvrosiivka Raion of Donetsk Oblast of the Ukrainian SSR. Kopani's name was changed to Voikovskyi in honor of Pyotr Voykov in 1938, and it received urban-type settlement status in 1940. During World War II, it was occupied by Nazi Germany between October 1941 and August 1943. 282 residents of Voikovskyi fought on the frontline of the war, 92 of whom died and 130 of whom received awards or medals. A memorial was erected in the town to those who died in the war.

As a result of the Soviet famine of 1946–1947 in Ukraine, approximately 100 people in Voikovskyi died.

=== 21st century ===
During the war in Donbas, Voikovskyi saw fighting between Ukrainian forces and Russian proxy forces. On the night of June 15, 2014, according to local residents, Voikovskyi was attacked by aircraft. On August 8, 2014, Voikovskyi was included on a map released by the National Security and Defense Council of Ukraine depicting settlements where exchanges of fire had taken place.

On August 24, a unit of the Armed Forces of Ukraine fell into an ambush in the town. Defending against the ambush, police officer Yuri Smirnov opened fire, attempting to cover his unit as it regrouped. Twice the opposing forces overcame the column unit, yet the Ukrainian soldiers continued fighting, deterring enemy attacks until they were successfully repulsed. After the battle, Ukraine comrades recovered the body of Yuri Smirnov. The town eventually fell under control of the Donetsk People's Republic, a breakaway state widely described as a puppet state of Russia.

In 2016, the Ukrainian government officially renamed the town back to Kopani, due to decommunization laws. In 2020, Amvrosiivka urban hromada was created as one of two amalgamated hromadas within Amvrosiivka Raion, and the hromada contained Kopani. Later in 2020, Amvrosiivka Raion was abolished, and Kopani - along with the rest of Amvrosiivka urban hromada - was assigned to the newly created Donetsk Raion.

== Demographics ==
As of the 2001 census, Voikovskyi had a population of 1,476 people, of whom 65% reported their ethnic background (natsionalnist) as Ukrainian and 30% as Russian. By 2022, the population had shrunk to an estimated 1,102.

== Economy ==
The town contains a brick factory.
