= Berdyanka =

Berdyanka or Berdianka may refer to:

- Berdyanka River (Бердянка), Orenburg Oblast, Russia
- Berdyanka Tract, part of Berdyanskyi State Reserve (uk:Бердянський заказник) in Amvrosiivka Raion, Ukraine
- Berdyanka, Luhansk Oblast, a village in Ukraine (uk:Бердянка (Слов'яносербський район))
- Berdyanka, Kharkiv Oblast, a village in Ukraine (uk:Бердянка (Зачепилівський район))
