= Olhynka settlement hromada =

Olhynka settlement hromada Ольгинська селищна громада
- Hromada
- Interactive map of Olhynka settlement hromada
- Country: Ukraine
- Oblast: Donetsk
- Raion: Volnovakha

Area
  - Total: 341.8 km^{2} (132.0 sq mi)

Population (2020)
  - Total: 19,174
  - Density: 56.10/km^{2} (145.3/sq mi)
- Settlements: 11
- Villages: 6
- Towns: 5

Olhynka settlement hromada (Ukrainian: Ольгинська селищна громада) is a hromada of Ukraine, located in Volnovakha Raion, Donetsk Oblast. Its administrative center is the town of Olhynka.

It has an area of 341.8 square kilometres (132.0 mi^{2}) and a population of 19,174, as of 2020.

The hromada includes 11 settlements: 5 towns (Blahodatne, Hrafske, Novotroitske, Olhynka, Volodymyrivka) and 6 villages:

- Bohdanivka
- Lisne
- Mykolaivka
- Novohnativka
- Pilne
- Viktorivka

== Population ==
As of the 2001 Ukrainian census, the hromada consisted of ten settlements and counted a total population of 22,665 inhabitants. Ukrainian was the most commonly spoken native language in the entire hromada, as well as the majority language in all settlements, with the only exception being Novohnativka, which was mostly Russophone. The exact linguistic composition of the hromada according to the census was as follows:

Native languages in Novotroitske
	percent
Ukrainian	69.5%
Russian	29.8%
Belarusian	0.1%
Armenian	0.1%
Moldovan	0.1%
others	0.3%

== See also ==
- List of hromadas of Ukraine
