= Blahodatne, Volnovakha Raion, Donetsk Oblast =

Blahodatne is the name of two settlements in the Volnovakha Raion of the Donetsk Oblast.

- Blahodatne, Olhynka settlement hromada, Volnovakha Raion, Donetsk Oblast
- Blahodatne, Velyka Novosilka settlement hromada, Volnovakha Raion, Donetsk Oblast
