= Zuivka =

Urban locality in Donetsk Oblast, Ukraine

Zuivka Зуївка
- Rural settlement
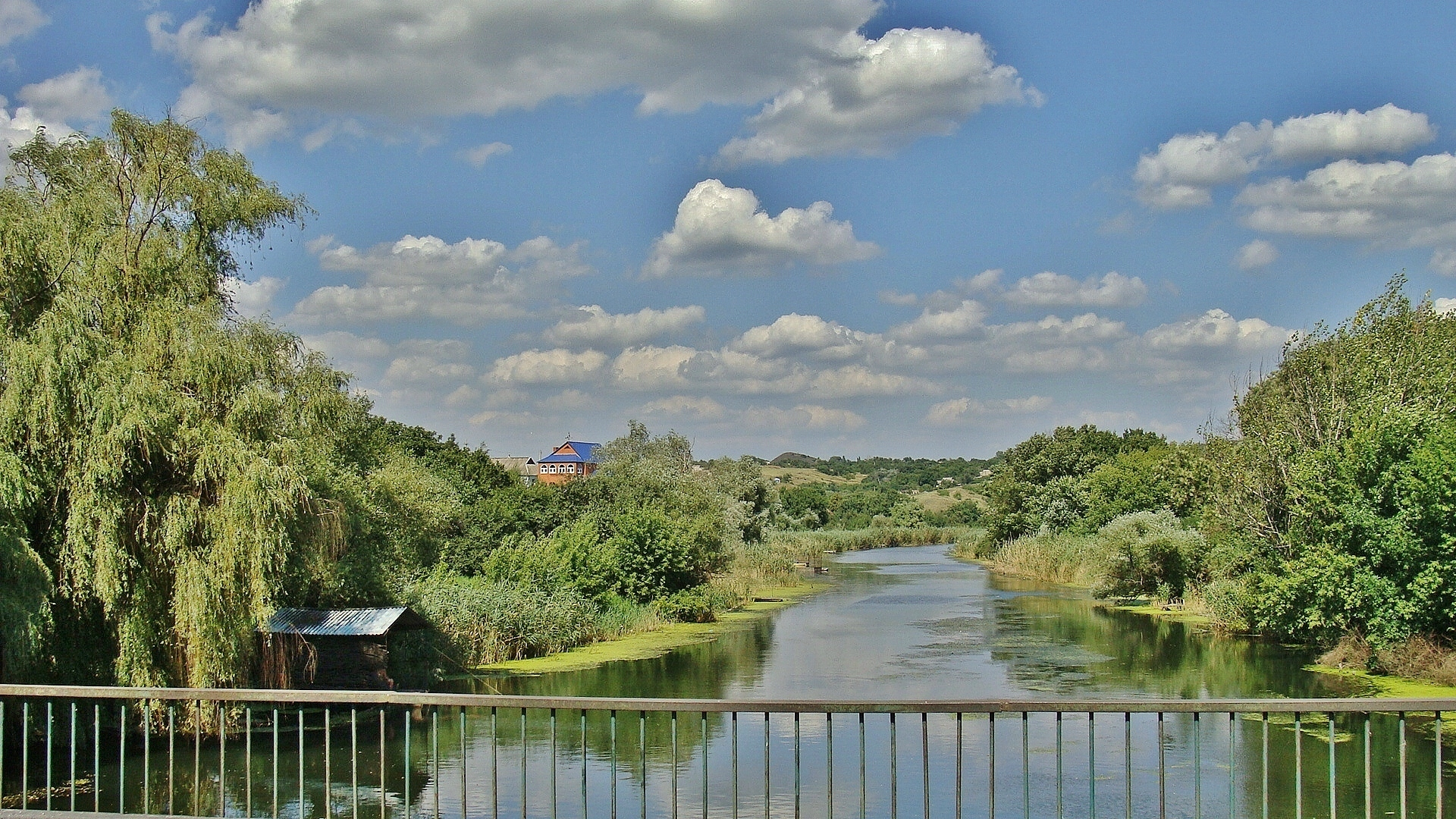
- Krynka river in Zuivka

- Location of Zuivka within Donetsk Oblast#Location of Zuivka within Ukraine Zuivka (Ukraine)
- Coordinates: 48°03′20″N 38°15′09″E
- Country: Ukraine
- Oblast: Donetsk Oblast
- Raion: Donetsk Raion
- Hromada: Khartsyzk urban hromada
- Elevation: 108 m (354 ft)

Population (2022)
  - Total: 3,070
- Time zone: UTC+2 (EET)
  - Summer (DST): UTC+3 (EEST)
- Postal code: 86781
- Area code: +380 6257

Zuivka (Ukrainian: Зуївка) is a rural settlement in Khartsyzk urban hromada, Donetsk Raion, Donetsk Oblast in Ukraine. Population: 3,070 (2022 estimate). It is located upon the Krynka river in the Donbas geographic region.

One of Ukraine's largest power plants with a capacity of 450,000 kilowatts was constructed near the settlement in 1924-1926.

== Demographics ==
Native language as of the Ukrainian Census of 2001:

- Ukrainian 15.57%
- Russian 83.37%
- Belarusian 0.19%
- Armenian 0.08%
