= Shakhtarsk Raion =

Former subdivision of Donetsk Oblast, Ukraine, in use by the Donetsk People's Republic

Shakhtarskyi Raion Шахтарський район
- Raion
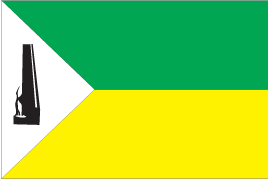
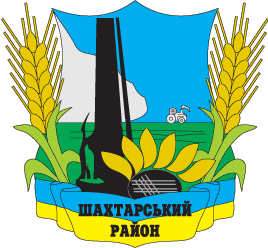
- Flag Coat of arms

- Coordinates: 48°0′23″N 38°28′46.3″E
- Country: Ukraine
- Region: Donetsk Oblast
- Established: 1965
- Disestablished: 18 July 2020
- Admin. center: Shakhtarsk
- Subdivisions: List: — city councils; — settlement councils; 13 — rural councils; Number of localities: — cities; — urban-type settlements; 42 — villages; 12 — rural settlements

Government
  - Governor: Dmytro Konakov

Area
  - Total: 1,100 km^{2} (420 sq mi)

Population (2020)
  - Total: 18,878 ▼
  - Density: 17/km^{2} (44/sq mi)
- Time zone: UTC+02:00 (EET)
  - Summer (DST): UTC+03:00 (EEST)
- Postal index: 86200-86263
- Area code: +380 6255

Shakhtarsk Raion (Ukrainian: Шахтарський район) was one of the raions of Donetsk Oblast, located in eastern Ukraine. The administrative center of the raion was the city of Shakhtarsk, which was incorporated separately as a city of oblast significance and was not part of the raion. The raion was abolished on 18 July 2020 as part of the administrative reform of Ukraine, which reduced the number of raions of Donetsk Oblast to eight. However the raion has not been under control of the Ukrainian government since 2014, and has been part of the Donetsk People's Republic which in 2015 abolished it and subordinated to the city of Shakhtarsk. The last estimate of the raion population, reported by the Ukrainian government, was 18,878 (2020 est.).

== Location ==
Shakhtarsk Raion was located in the eastern part of Donetsk Oblast and to its southeast it had an international border with Rostov Oblast of the Russian Federation. To its east it borders Luhansk Oblast.

To the south is Amvrosiivka Raion, and to its north, Bakhmut Raion. To the west of Shakhtars Raion stretched a chain of several cities with separate regional-level self-government such as Makiivka, Khartsyzk, Yenakieve, Zhdanivka. The raion also completely surrounded the cities of Shakhtarsk, Torez, and Snizhne.

== War in Donbas ==
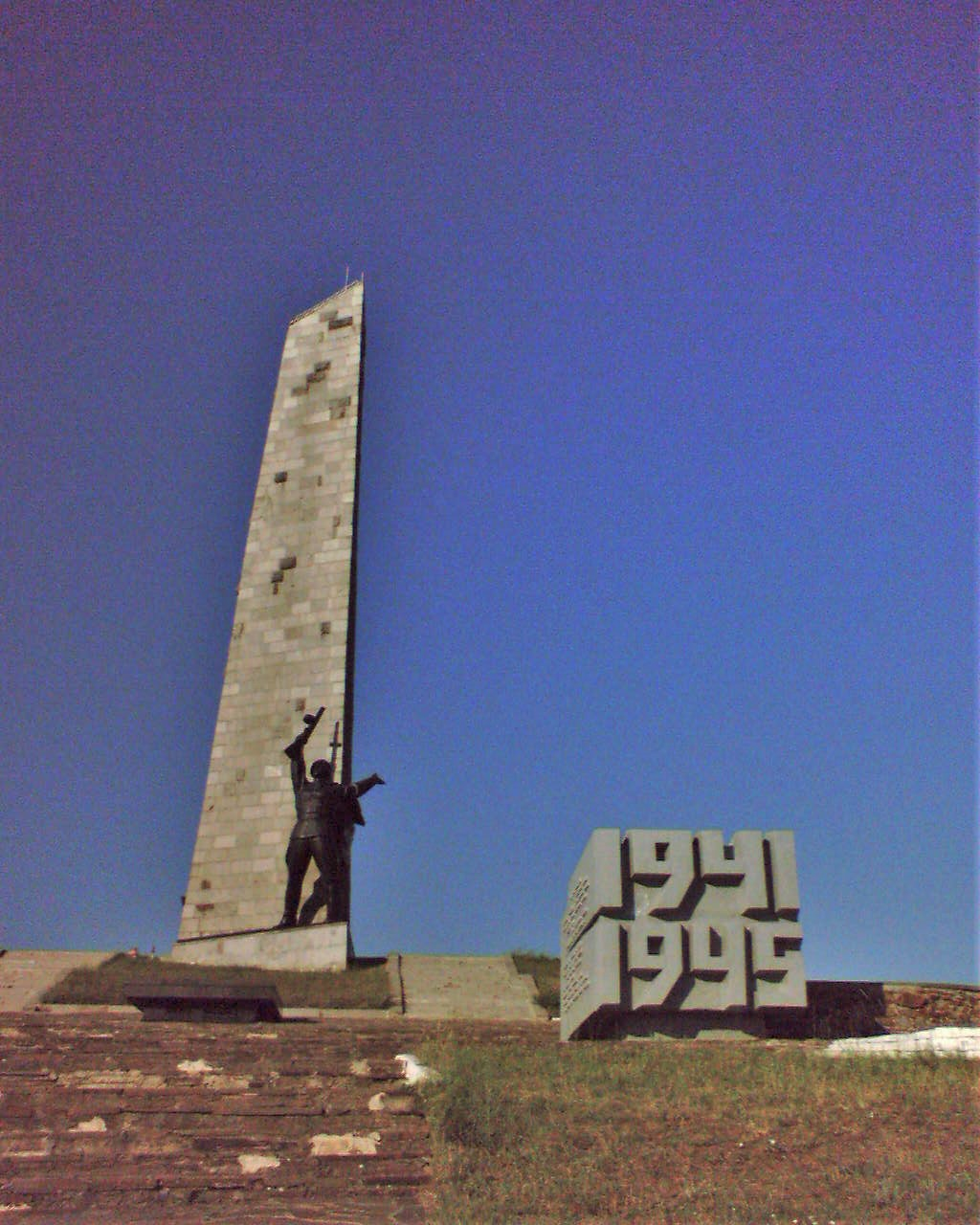
Savur Mohyla memorial in 2008

Shakhtarsk Raion had one international border crossing with the Russian Federation, Marynivka - Kuibyshevo. On June 5, 2014, the Government of Ukraine was forced to close the border crossing, due to multiple reports of unsanctioned crossings by militants from the Russian Federation. On June 6, 2014 intense fighting erupted at the Marynivka border checkpoint between Ukrainian border guards and militants who tried to cross into Ukraine from the Russian Federation.

During the war in Donbas several battles took place around the Savur-Mohyla heights. The obelisk of the Savur-Mohyla Soviet memorial is depicted on the coat of arms and flag of Shakhtarsk Raion.

The Malaysia Airlines Flight 17, remnants of which scattered around the village of Hrabove, went down within the area of the raion.

On August 10–11, 2014 Ukrainian media claimed that the village of Stepanivka was completely destroyed by BM-21 Grad multi-rocket launcher systems fired from the territory of the Russian Federation.

== Demographics ==
As of the 2001 Ukrainian Census, the majority of residents are ethnic Ukrainians and speak Ukrainian as their first language:

Ethnicity		
Ukrainians	18,042	74.4%
Russians	5,663	23.3%
Belarusians	249	1.0%

Language	
Ukrainian	53.36%
Russian	46.25%
Belarusian	0.12%
Armenian	0.06%

== Localities ==
- Zakharchenko
