= Gnadenfeld =

Gnadenfeld is a Mennonite placename. It may refer to:

== Russia ==
- Gnadenfeld, Kabardino-Balkarian Republic
- The former name of Obolonsky, Russia
- The former name of Kirovo, Saratov Oblast

== Ukraine ==
- The former name of Shafranne, Crimea
- The former name of Blahodatne, Plakhtiivka rural hromada, Sarata Raion, Odesa Oblast
- The former name of Bohdanivka, Berdiansk Raion, Zaporizhzhia Oblast
- The former name of Neikove, Odesa Oblast
- The former name of Blahodatne, Beryslav Raion, Kherson Oblast

== Other ==
- A former village in the United States, located at the site of modern Goessel, Kansas
- The former name of Pawłowiczki, Poland
- The former name of Gorkunovo, Kazakhstan
- Gnadenfeld, Manitoba, Canada
