= Shyroke, Donetsk Oblast =

Urban locality in Donetsk Oblast, Ukraine

Shyroke Широке
- Rural settlement
- Location of Shyroke within Donetsk Oblast#Location of Shyroke within Ukraine Shyroke (Ukraine)
- Coordinates: 47°57′27″N 38°13′51″E
- Country: Ukraine
- Oblast: Donetsk Oblast
- Raion: Donetsk Raion
- Hromada: Khartsyzk urban hromada
- Elevation: 164 m (538 ft)

Population (2022)
  - Total: 724
- Time zone: UTC+2 (EET)
  - Summer (DST): UTC+3 (EEST)
- Postal code: 86792
- Area code: +380 6257

Shyroke (Ukrainian: Широке) is a rural settlement in Khartsyzk urban hromada, Donetsk Raion in Donetsk Oblast of Ukraine Population: 724 (2022 estimate)

== Demographics ==
Native language as of the Ukrainian Census of 2001:

- Ukrainian 21.52%
- Russian 77.33%
- Armenian 0.10%
