= Dmytrivka, Horlivka Raion =

Dmytrivka Дмитрівка
- Village
- Location within Ukraine Location within Donetsk Oblast
- Coordinates: 47°56′03″N 38°56′15″E
- Country: Ukraine
- Oblast: Donetsk Oblast
- District: Shakhtarsk Raion
- Founded: 1777
- Elevation: 49 m (161 ft)

Population (2001 census)
  - Total: 3,370
- Time zone: UTC+2 (EET)
  - Summer (DST): UTC+3 (EEST)
- Postal code: 86262
- Area code: +380 6255
- Website: http://rada.gov.ua/

Dmytrivka (Ukrainian: Дмитрівка) is a village in Horlivka Raion, a part of Donetsk Oblast within Ukraine. It is de facto administered by separatist officials as part of the former Shakhtarsk Raion.

== Population ==
According to the 2001 census, the population of the village was 3,370. 91.72% of the village said that Ukrainian was their native language, 8.13% said that it was Russian, and 0.15% said that it was Belarusian.
