= Pokrovka, Donetsk Oblast =

Urban locality in Donetsk Oblast, Ukraine

Pokrovka Покровка
- Rural settlement
- Location of Pokrovka within Donetsk Oblast#Location of Pokrovka within Ukraine Pokrovka (Ukraine)
- Coordinates: 47°56′11″N 38°16′43″E
- Country: Ukraine
- Oblast: Donetsk Oblast
- Raion: Donetsk Raion
- Hromada: Khartsyzk urban hromada
- Elevation: 90 m (300 ft)

Population (2022)3,919 (2022 estimate)
  - Total: 168
- Time zone: UTC+2 (EET)
  - Summer (DST): UTC+3 (EEST)
- Postal code: 86790
- Area code: +380 6257

Pokrovka (Ukrainian: Покровка) is a rural settlement located in Khartsyzk urban hromada, Donetsk Raion in Donetsk Oblast, eastern Ukraine. Population: 158 (2022 estimate).

== Demographics ==
Native language as of the Ukrainian Census of 2001:

- Ukrainian 71.2%
- Russian 28.26%
