= Zuhres =

City in Donetsk Oblast, Ukraine

Zuhres Зугрес Зугрэс
- City
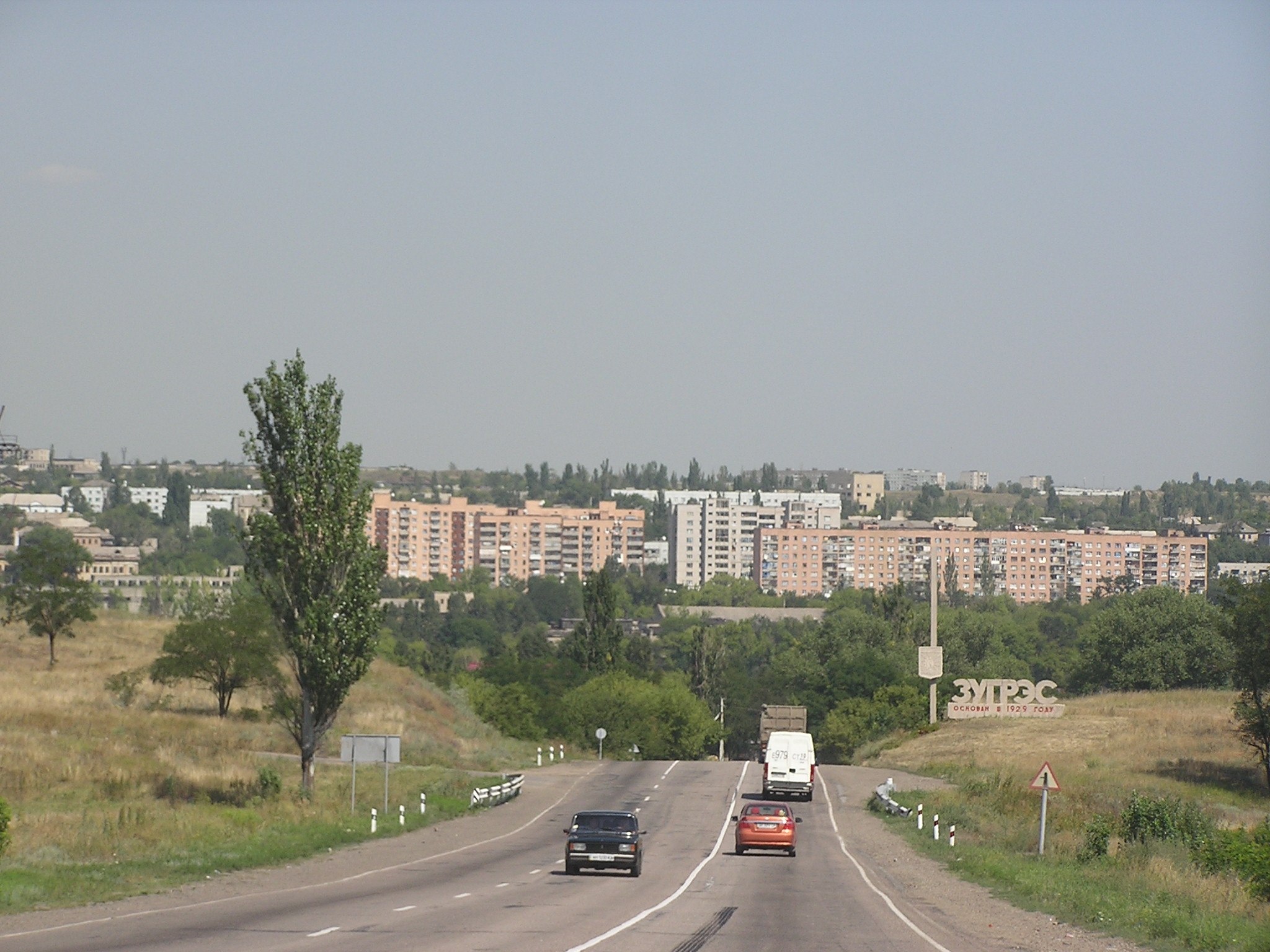
- Skyline of Zuhres

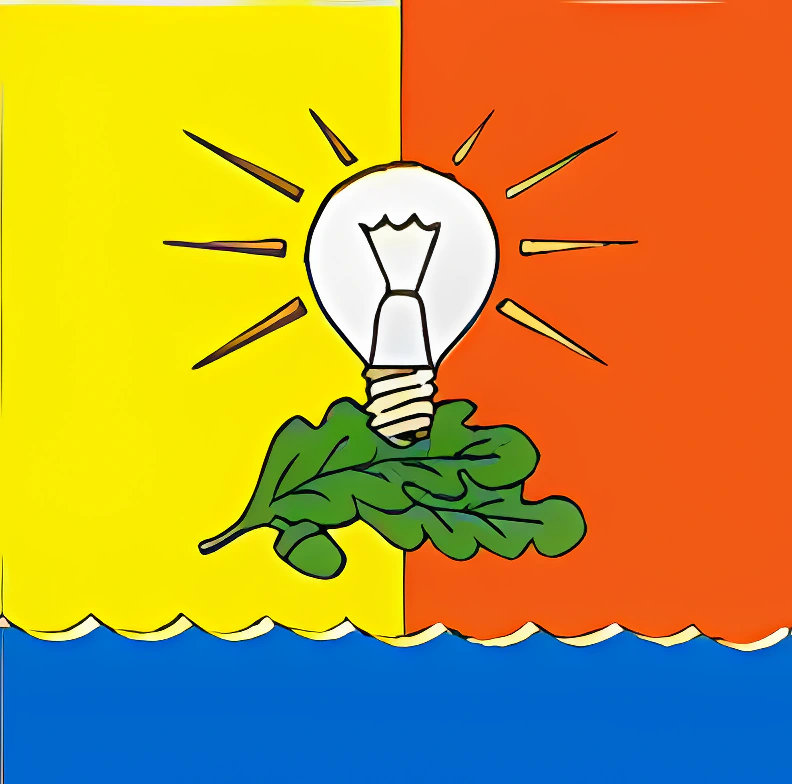
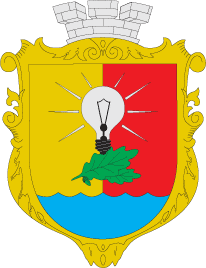
- Flag Seal
- Interactive map of Zuhres
- Location within Donetsk Oblast Location within Ukraine
- Coordinates: 48°01′N 38°16′E
- Country: Ukraine
- Oblast: Donetsk Oblast
- Raion: Donetsk Raion
- Hromada: Khartsyzk urban hromada
- Founded: 1929

Population (2022)
  - Total: 17,871

Zuhres or Zugres (Ukrainian: Зугрес, pronounced [zʊˈɦrɛs]; Russian: Зугрэс) is a city in Khartsyzk urban hromada, Donetsk Raion, Donetsk Oblast in Ukraine. The city has a population of 17,871 (2022 estimate). It is currently occupied by Russia and forces of the de facto Donetsk People's Republic.

== Geography ==
Zuhres is located upon the Krynka river in the historical region of Donbas.

== History ==
The history of the city starts with the decision to build near a settlement Zuyivka a thermal power plant as part of the Soviet GOELRO plan in 1929. The name for the new settlement around the plant was given after the plant as "ZuHRES", Zuyivka Government Raion Electrical Station. The first power plant was built in 1932 and later there was built another plant in 1980s.

During World War II, the Germans occupied the town and murdered local Jews as well as communists in mass executions in a ravine outside the city.

Since 2014, Zuhres has been administered as a part of the de facto Donetsk People's Republic. On 7 October 2014, a captured Ukrainian was tied to a pole in the city center, and local separatists abused him for several hours. The victim was a 53-year-old volunteer of the "Donbas" battalion, Ihor Kozhoma, who tried to take his wife out of the occupied territory. One of the first recorded cases of torture of prisoners of war by the Russians. This case was reflected in the film Donbas.

== Demographics ==
As of the 2001 Ukrainian census, Zuhres had a population of 19,910 people. Ethnic Ukrainians constitute a majority in the city, yet Russian is most common language for communication on the streets. The exact ethnic and linguistic composition was as follows:

Ethnic groups in Zuhres
	percent
Ukrainians	51.94%
Russians	45.24%
Belarusians	0.74%
Greeks	0.40%
Armenians	0.25%
Georgians	0.24%
Tatars	0.17%
Moldovans	0.16%
others	0.86%

Native languages (2001)
	percent
Russian	85.4%
Ukrainian	14.2%
Belarusian	0.1%
others	0.2%

== Economy ==
A mechanical factory, a gravel factory and a building materials combine are located in the city.

== Gallery ==
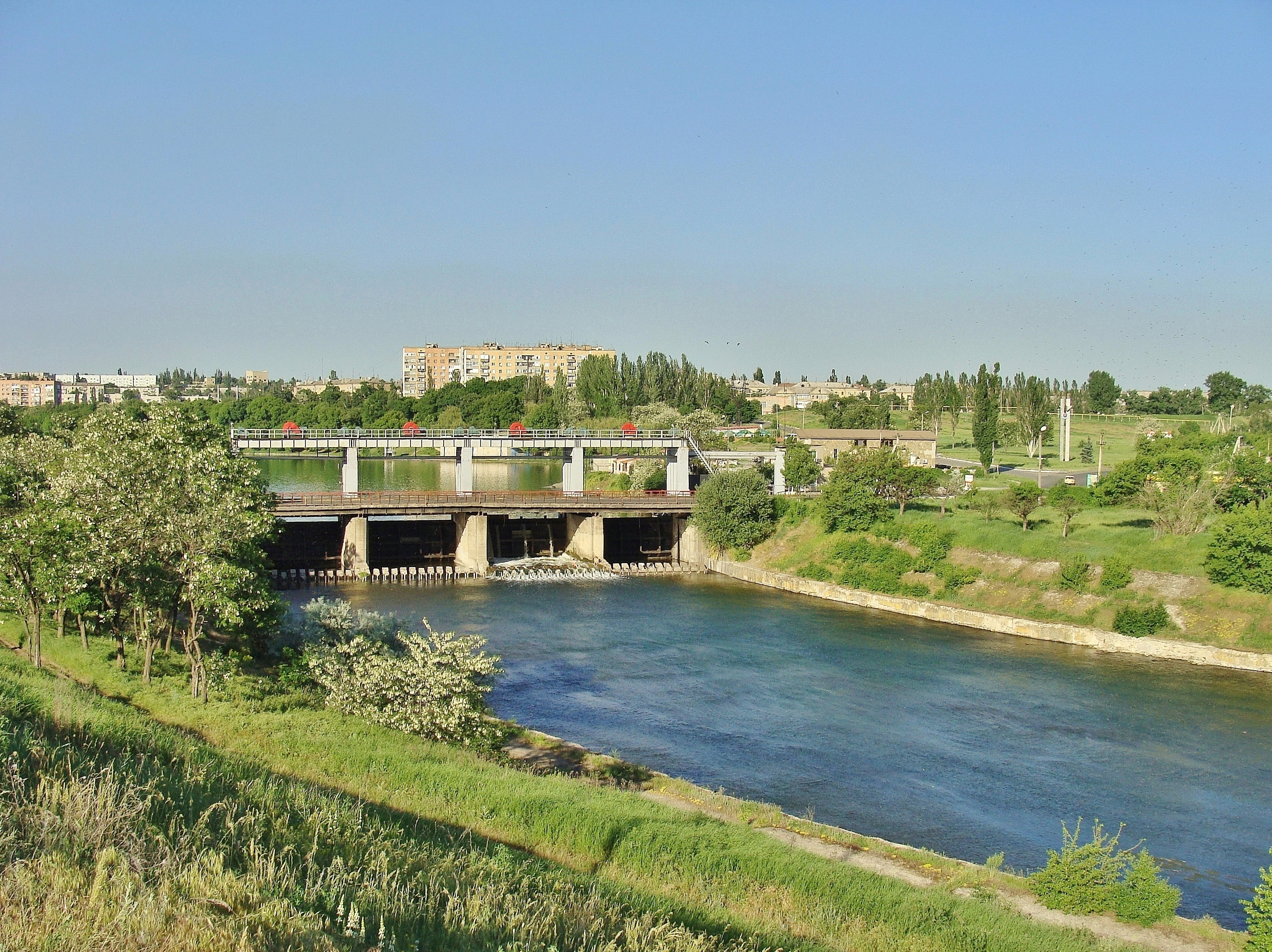
Zuhres dam

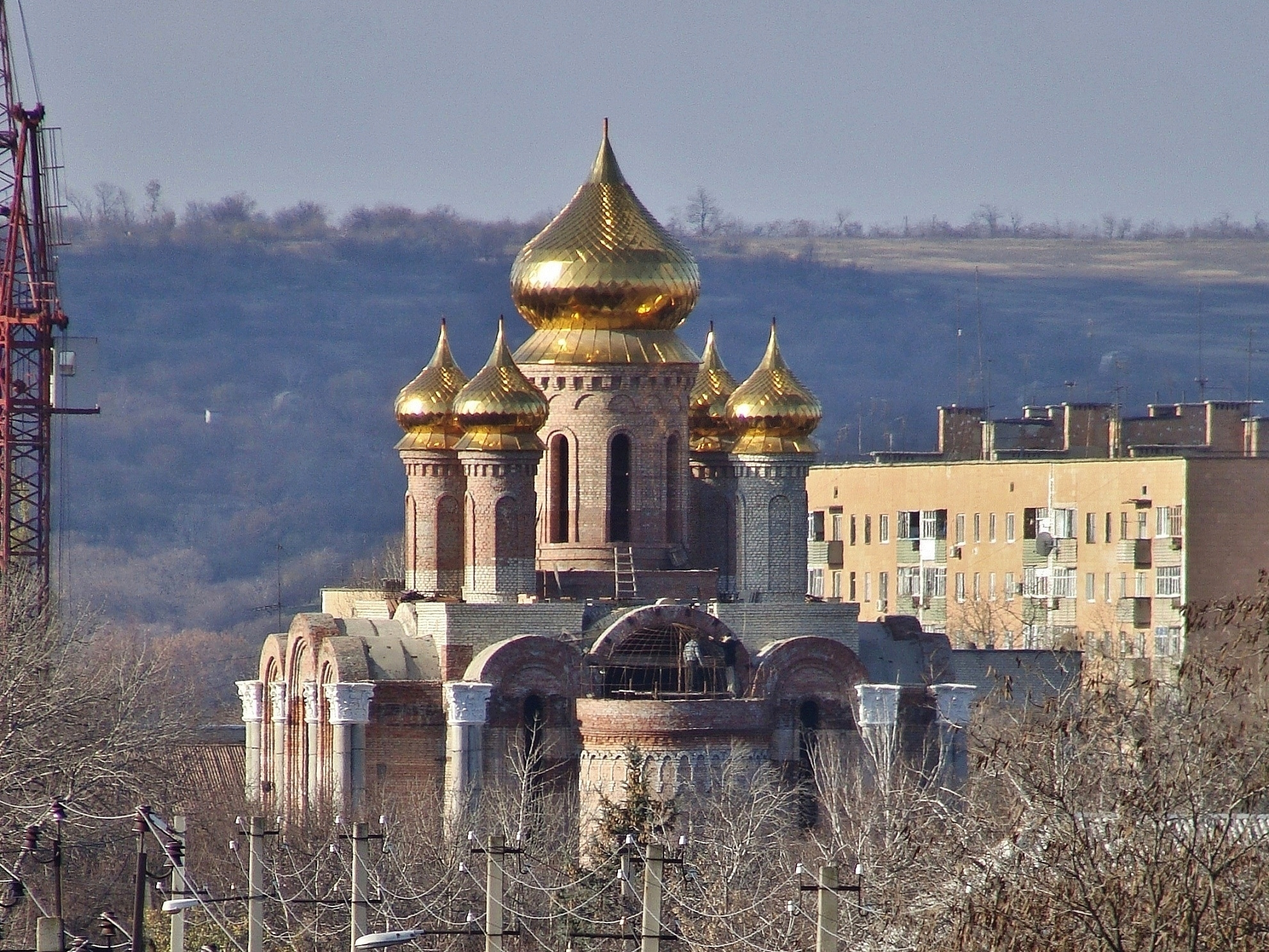
Church of Nativity in Zuhres

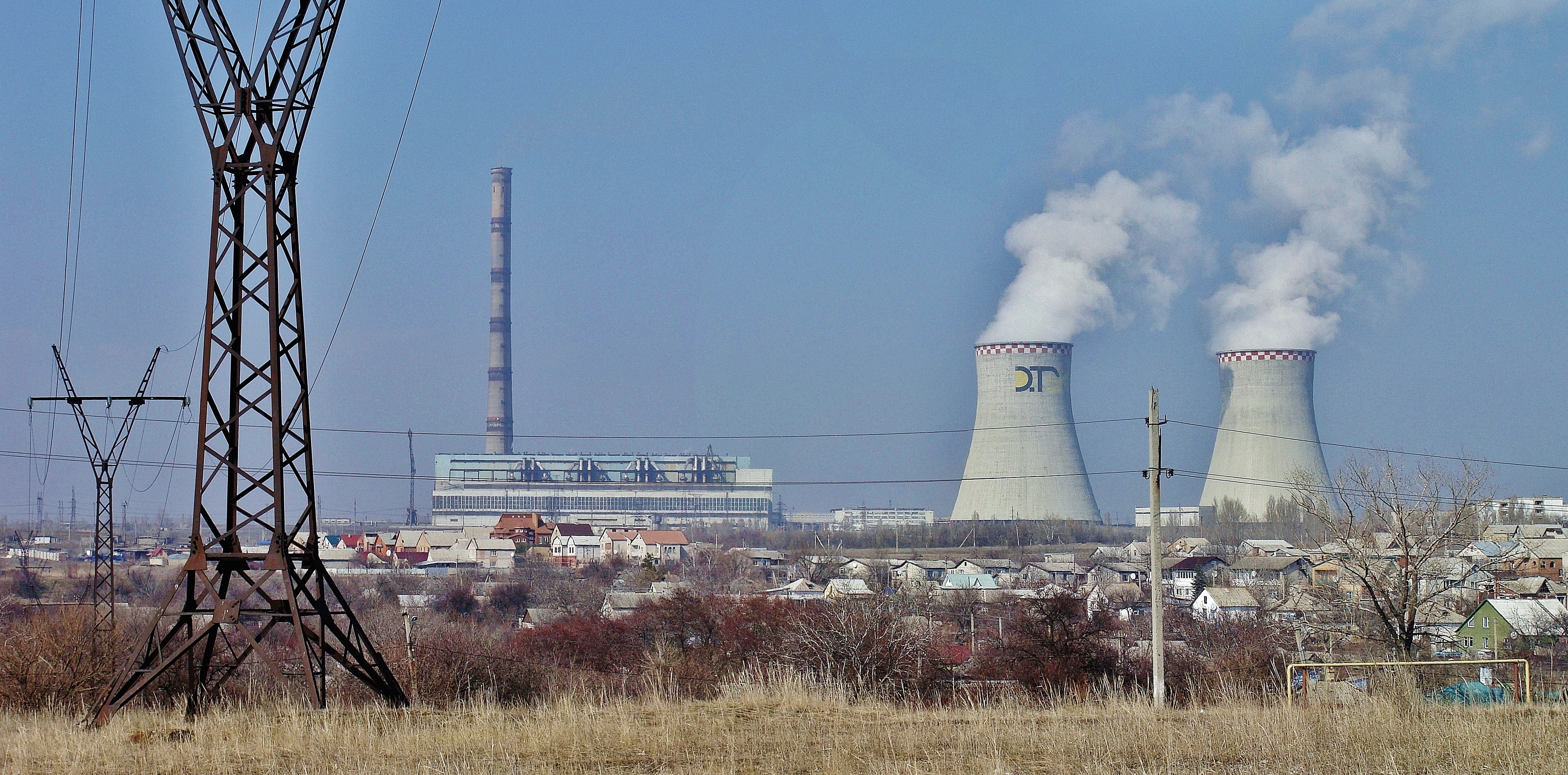
Zuhres power plant

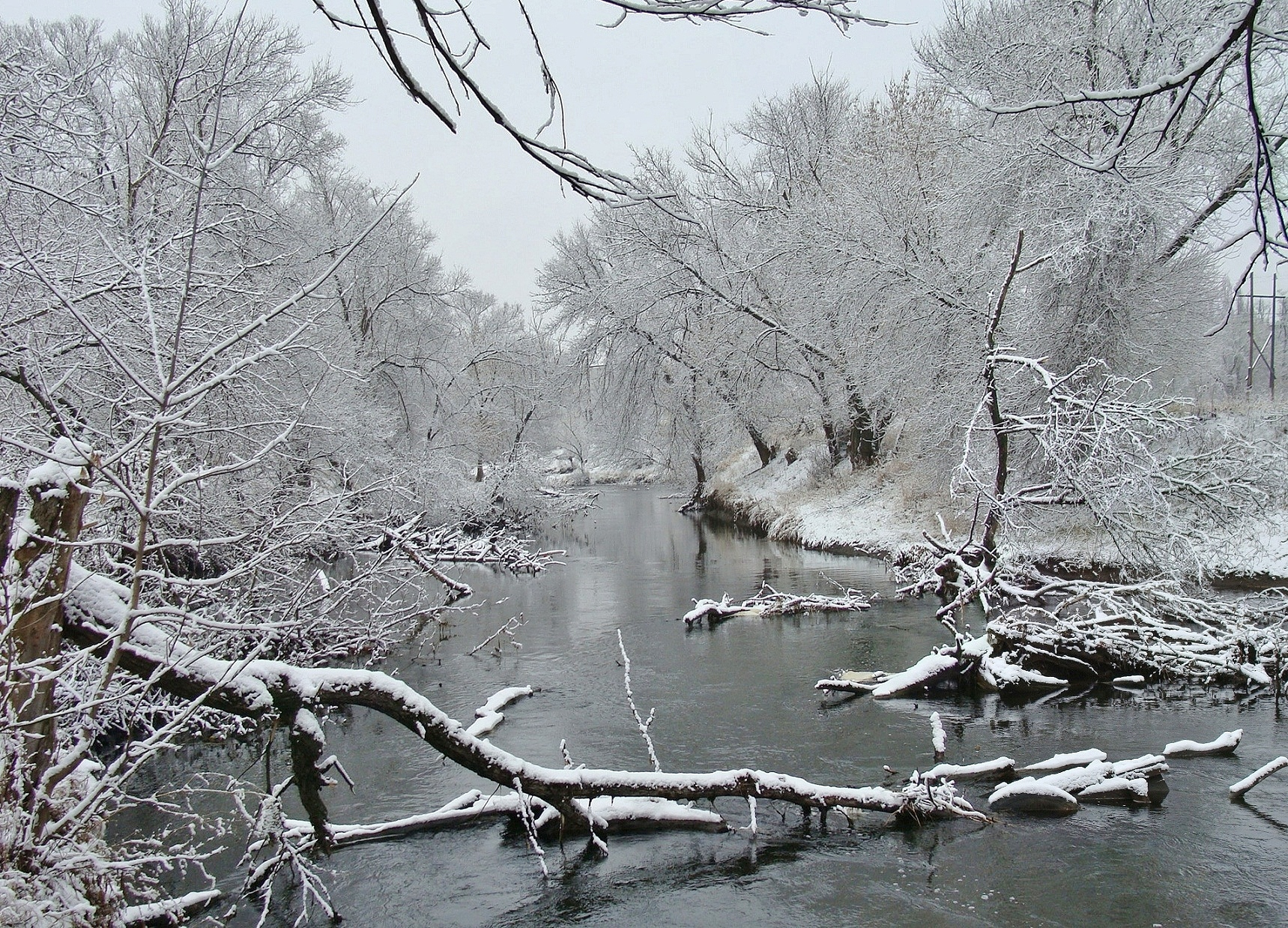
Krynka River near Zuhres
