= Ulianivske =

Ulianivske Улянівське Ульяновское
- Rural settlement
- Location of Ulianivske Ulianivske (Ukraine)
- Coordinates: 47°38′07″N 38°23′59″E
- Country: Ukraine
- Oblast: Donetsk Oblast
- Raion: Donetsk Raion
- Hromada: Amvrosiivka urban hromada
- Elevation: 76 m (249 ft)

Population (2001 census)
  - Total: 853
- Time zone: UTC+2 (EET)
  - Summer (DST): UTC+3 (EEST)
- Postal code: 87352
- Area code: +380 6259

Ulianivske (Ukrainian: Улянівське) is a rural settlement in Amvrosiivka urban hromada, Donetsk Raion, Donetsk Oblast, Ukraine.

== Demographics ==
Native language as of the Ukrainian Census of 2001:

- Ukrainian 50.41%
- Russian 49.36%
- Belarusian 0.23%
