= Kvashyne =

Kvashyne Квашине Квашино
- Rural settlement
- Location of Kvashyne Kvashyne (Ukraine)
- Coordinates: 47°44′49″N 38°35′12″E
- Country: Ukraine
- Oblast: Donetsk Oblast
- Raion: Donetsk Raion
- Hromada: Amvrosiivka urban hromada
- Elevation: 140 m (460 ft)

Population (2001 census)
  - Total: 122
- Time zone: UTC+2 (EET)
  - Summer (DST): UTC+3 (EEST)
- Postal code: 87370
- Area code: +380 6259

Kvashyne (Ukrainian: Квашине) is a rural settlement in Amvrosiivka urban hromada, Donetsk Raion (district) in Donetsk Oblast of Ukraine.

== Demographics ==
Native language as of the Ukrainian Census of 2001:

- Ukrainian 2.46%
- Russian 95.90%
- Armenian and Moldovan 0.82%
