= Khartsyzk urban hromada =

Khartsyzk urban hromada Харцизька міська громада
- Hromada
- Interactive map of Khartsyzk urban hromada
- Country: Ukraine
- Oblast: Donetsk Oblast
- Raion: Donetsk Raion
- Settlements: 18
- Cities: 2
- Rural settlements: 10
- Villages: 6

Khartsyzk urban hromada (Ukrainian: Харцизька міська громада) is a hromada of Ukraine, located in Donetsk Raion, Donetsk Oblast. Its administrative center is the city Khartsyzk.

The hromada contains 37 settlements: 2 cities (Khartsyzk and Zuhres), 10 rural settlements:

- Blahodatne
- Hirne
- Mykolaivka
- Pokrovka
- Troitsko-Khartsyzk
- Shakhtne
- Shyroke
- Vedmezhe
- Vodobud
- Zuivka

And 6 villages:

- Dubivka
- Novomykolaivka
- Novopelahiivka
- Pivche
- Tsupky
- Zolotarivka

== See also ==
- List of hromadas of Ukraine
