= Dzerkalne =

Dzerkalne Дзеркальне
- Rural settlement
- Location within Donetsk Oblast Location within Ukraine
- Coordinates: 47°47′41″N 38°15′35″E
- Country: Ukraine
- Oblast: Donetsk Oblast
- Raion: Donetsk Raion
- Hromada: Amvrosiivka urban hromada

Population (2001)
  - Total: 65
- Climate: Dfa

Dzerkalne (Ukrainian: Дзеркальне), or Zerkalnoye (Russian: Зеркальное), is a rural settlement in Amvrosiivka urban hromada, Donetsk Raion (district) in Donetsk Oblast of Ukraine, 39.9 kilometres south-east from Donetsk. Population: 65 (2001).

== 2014 pro-Russian unrest in Ukraine ==
During the Battle of Ilovaisk, on August 24, 2014, a column of the Russian 331st Airborne Regiment was hit by Ukrainian troops of the 51st Mechanized Brigade near the rural settlement Kuteinykove. Ten armed Russian paratroopers were captured later during the night near Dzerkalne, just a mile away from where the column was destroyed. On the evening of August 25, the Security Service of Ukraine (SBU) announced the capture. Russia, however, said that the ten Russian soldiers, 20 kilometers from the Russian border, only entered Ukraine by mistake.
