= Mykolaivka, Donetsk Raion, Donetsk Oblast =

Urban locality in Donetsk Oblast, Ukraine

Mykolaivka Миколаївка
- Rural settlement
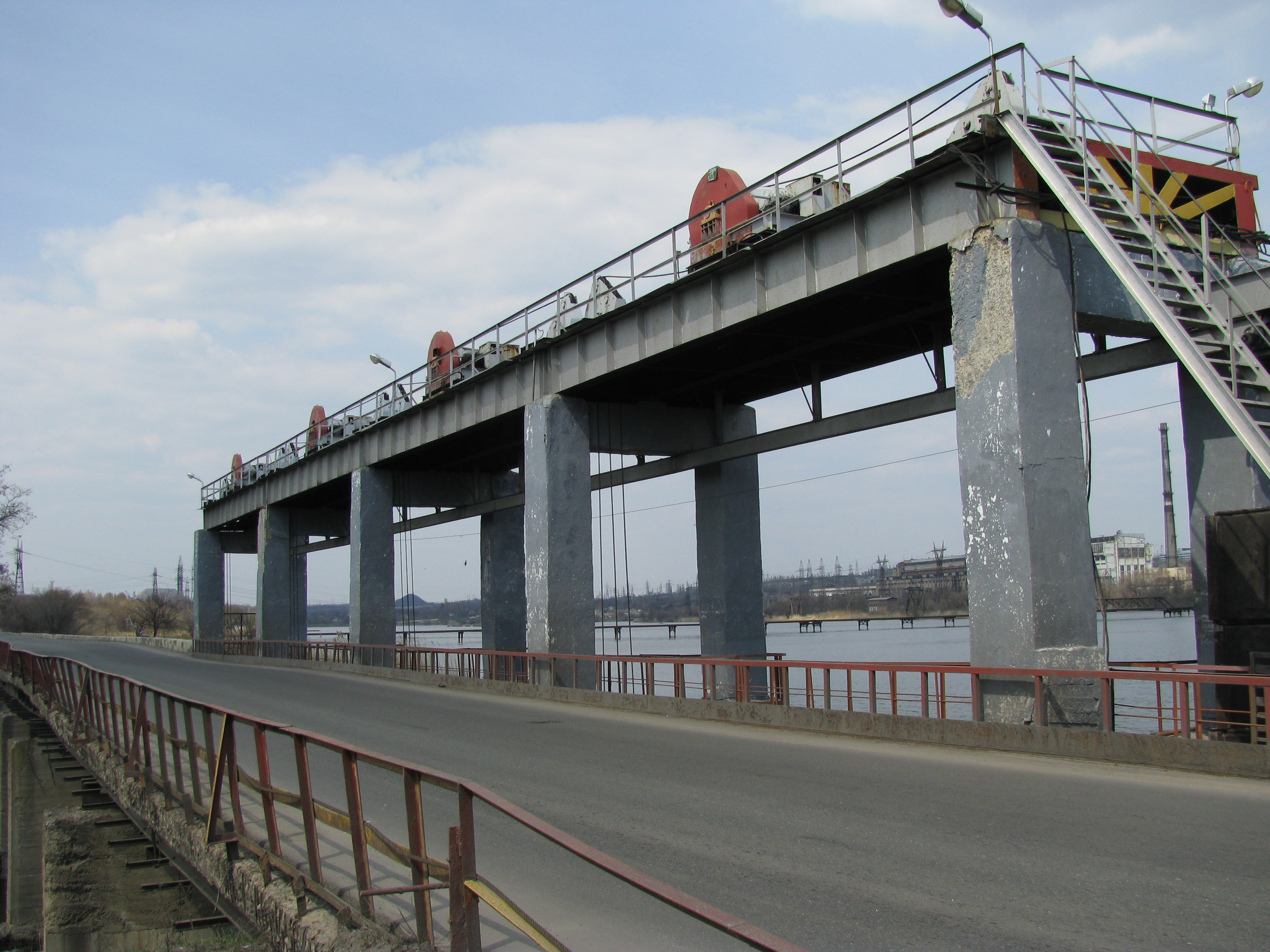

- Location within Donetsk Oblast Location within Ukraine
- Coordinates: 48°00′04″N 38°14′45″E
- Country: Ukraine
- Oblast: Donetsk Oblast
- Raion: Donetsk Raion
- Hromada: Khartsyzk urban hromada

Population (2022)
  - Total: 115
- Time zone: UTC+2 (EET)
  - Summer (DST): UTC+3 (EEST)

Mykolaivka (Ukrainian: Миколаївка) is a rural settlement in Donetsk Raion of Donetsk Oblast in Ukraine. It belongs to Khartsyzk urban hromada, one of the hromadas of Ukraine. Population: 115 (2022 estimate)

== Demographics ==
Native language as of the Ukrainian Census of 2001:

- Ukrainian 42.97%
- Russian 55.42%
- Belarusian, German and Greek 0.4%
