= Amvrosiivka urban hromada =

Amvrosiivka urban hromada Амвросіївська міська громада
- Hromada
- Interactive map of Amvrosiivka urban hromada
- Country: Ukraine
- Oblast: Donetsk Oblast
- Raion: Donetsk Raion
- Settlements: 58
- Cities: 1
- Rural settlements: 26
- Villages: 31

Amvrosiivka urban hromada (Ukrainian: Амвросіївська міська громада) is a hromada of Ukraine, located in Donetsk Raion, Donetsk Oblast. Its administrative center is the city Amvrosiivka.

The hromada contains 58 settlements: 1 city (Amvrosiivka), 26 rural settlements:

- Dzerkalne
- Kalynove
- Katerynivka
- Kharkivske
- Klenivka
- Kopani
- Krynychky
- Kvashyne
- Lysyche
- Merezhky
- Novoamvrosiivske
- Nyzhnokrynske
- Obrizne
- Ovocheve
- Petrenky
- Pobieda
- Rodnyky
- Rubashkyne
- Serhiieve-Krynka
- Stepne
- Svobodne
- Trepelne
- Ulianivske
- Vyselky
- Zhukova Balka
- Zhytenko

And 31 villages:

- Artemivka
- Biloiarivka
- Blahodatne
- Hryhorivka
- Kalynove
- Karpovo-Nadezhdynka
- Komyshuvakha
- Kosharne
- Krasnyi Luch
- Kyselivka
- Mala Shyshivka
- Manych
- Mokroielanchyk
- Novoielanchyk
- Novoivanivka
- Novoklynivka
- Novoukrainske
- Oleksiivske
- Olhynske
- Pavlivske
- Petropavlivka
- Sadove
- Semenivske
- Siiatel
- Svystuny
- Uspenka
- Vasylivka
- Velyke Mishkove
- Verkhnoielanchyk
- Vilkhivchyk
- Yelyzaveto-Mykolaivka

== See also ==
- List of hromadas of Ukraine
