= Zakharchenko, Horlivka Raion, Donetsk Oblast =

Zakharchenko Захарченко
- Rural settlement
- Location within Ukraine
- Coordinates: 47°59′18″N 38°26′46″E
- Country: Ukraine
- Oblast: Donetsk Oblast

Population (2001 census)
  - Total: 348
- Time zone: UTC+2 (EET)
  - Summer (DST): UTC+3 (EEST)
- Postal code: 86203
- Area code: +380 6255

Zakharchenko (Ukrainian: Захарченко) is a rural settlement in Horlivka Raion, Donetsk Oblast, eastern Ukraine. As of 2001 it had a population of 348 people.
