= Stepanivka, Donetsk Oblast =

Stepanivka Степанівка
- Village
- Stepanivka shown within Ukraine Stepanivka shown within Donetsk
- Coordinates: 48°0′9″N 37°19′14″E
- Country: Ukraine
- Oblast: Donetsk Oblast
- Raion: Pokrovsk Raion
- Hromada: Kurakhove urban hromada
- Elevation: 124 m (407 ft)

Population (2001)
  - Total: 46
- Postal code: 85615
- Area code: +380 6278

Stepanivka (Ukrainian: Степанівка; Russian: Степановка) is a village in the Pokrovsk Raion of Donetsk Oblast, Ukraine.

On November 1, 2024 Russia claimed to have captured the village, Deepstatemap confirmed this on November 4.
