= Blahodatne, Amvrosiivka urban hromada, Donetsk Raion, Donetsk Oblast =

Village in Donetsk Oblast, Ukraine

Blahodatne Благодатне
- Village
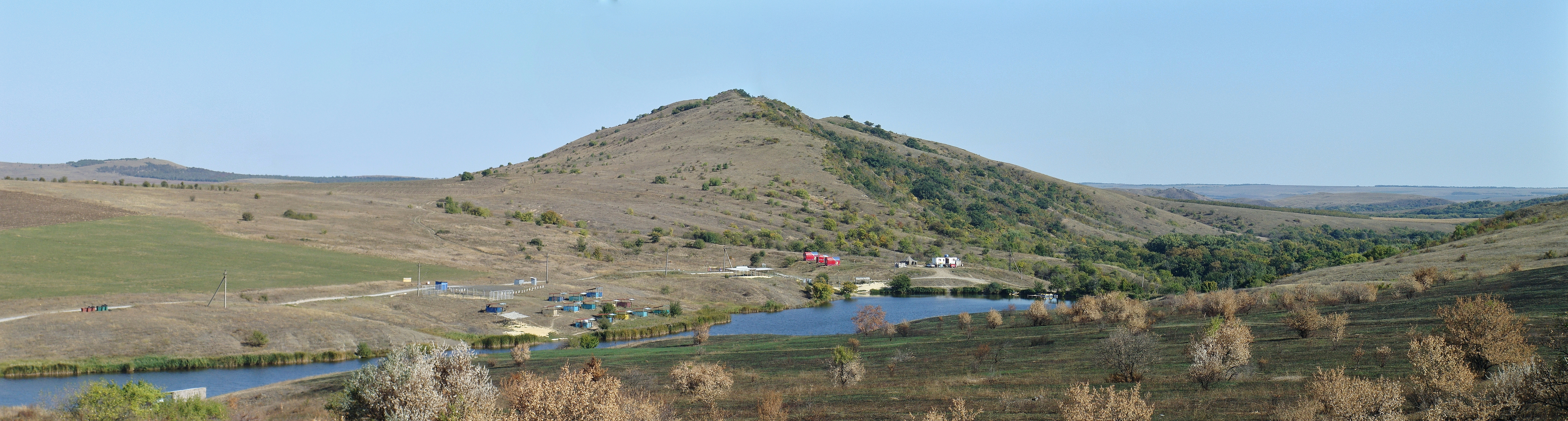

- Location within Donetsk Oblast Location within Ukraine
- Coordinates: 47°52′26″N 38°28′48″E
- Country: Ukraine
- Oblast: Donetsk Oblast
- Raion: Donetsk Raion
- Hromada: Amvrosiivka urban hromada
- Elevation: 59 m (194 ft)

Population (2001)
  - Total: 3,649
- Time zone: UTC+2 (EET)
  - Summer (DST): UTC+3 (EEST)

Blahodatne (Ukrainian: Благодатне) is a village in Amvrosiivka urban hromada, Donetsk Raion (district) in Donetsk Oblast of Ukraine. Population: 37 (2022 estimate)

== History ==
The village survived the Soviet regime orchestrated Holodomor ("death through famine") of 1932-33 with at least 212 people accounted who lost their lives due to the Soviet sanctions.

Before 2020, Blahodatne was part of Amvrosiivka Raion. In July that year, the raion was abolished and its territory merged into the newly created Donetsk Raion.

== Demographics ==
Native language as of the Ukrainian Census of 2001:

- Ukrainian 93.40%
- Russian 6.49%
- Belarusian 0.03%

== Climate ==
Climate chart (precipitation, max. and min. temperature)
J	F	M	A	M	J	J	A	S	O	N	D
50 −1 −7	40 1 −6	49 7 −2	52 15 4	59 22 11	62 26 15	47 29 18	34 29 18	44 22 12	41 14 6	42 6 0	50 1 −4
- █ Average max. and min. temperatures in °C
- █ Precipitation totals in mm
- Source: Climate-Data.org
Imperial conversion
J	F	M	A	M	J	J	A	S	O	N	D
2 30 20	1.6 33 21	1.9 44 28	2 59 40	2.3 71 51	2.4 79 60	1.9 84 65	1.3 84 64	1.7 72 54	1.6 57 42	1.7 43 32	2 34 25
- █ Average max. and min. temperatures in °F
- █ Precipitation totals in inches

== Notable people ==
- Filaret Denysenko (1929–2026), Patriarch of the Ukrainian Orthodox Church – Kyiv Patriarchate
