= Novoamvrosiivske =

Urban locality in Donetsk Oblast, Ukraine

Novoamvrosiivske Новоамвросіївське
- Rural settlement
- Location of Novoamvrosiivske within Donetsk Oblast#Location of Novoamvrosiivske within Ukraine Novoamvrosiivske (Ukraine)
- Coordinates: 47°49′56″N 38°30′07″E
- Country: Ukraine
- Oblast: Donetsk Oblast
- Raion: Donetsk Raion
- Hromada: Amvrosiivka urban hromada
- Elevation: 152 m (499 ft)

Population (2022)
  - Total: 2,118
- Time zone: UTC+2 (EET)
  - Summer (DST): UTC+3 (EEST)
- Postal code: 87333—87334
- Area code: +380 6259

Novoamvrosiivske (Ukrainian: Новоамвросіївське) is a rural settlement in Amvrosiivka urban hromada, Donetsk Raion (district) in Donetsk Oblast of Ukraine. Population: 2,118 (2022 estimate).

== Demographics ==
Native language as of the Ukrainian Census of 2001:

- Ukrainian 29.41%
- Russian 70.13%
- Belarusian and Moldovan (Romanian) 0.12%
