= Blagodatnoye, Medvensky District, Kursk Oblast =

Rural locality in Kursk Oblast, Russia

Blagodatnoye Благодатное
- Village
- Interactive map of Blagodatnoye
- Location of Blagodatnoye Blagodatnoye (Kursk Oblast)
- Coordinates: 51°28′57″N 35°43′53″E
- Country: Russia
- Federal subject: Kursk Oblast
- Administrative district: Medvensky District
- SelsovietSelsoviet: Gostomlyansky

Population (2010 Census)
  - Total: 56
  - Estimate (2010): 56 (0%)

Municipal status
  - Municipal district: Medvensky Municipal District
  - Rural settlement: Gostomlyansky Selsoviet Rural Settlement
- Time zone: UTC+3 (MSK)
- Postal code: 307042
- Dialing code: +7 47146
- OKTMO ID: 38624420146
- Website: gostomlja.ru

Blagodatnoye (Russian: Благодатное) is a rural locality (Russian: деревня, lit. 'village') in Gostomlyansky Selsoviet Rural Settlement, Medvensky District, Kursk Oblast, Russia. Population: 56 (2010 census); 55 (2002 census);

== Geography ==
The village is located on the Reut River (a left tributary of the Seym), 50 km (31 mi) from the Russia–Ukraine border, 38 km (24 mi) south-west of Kursk, 26 km (16 mi) north-west of the district center – the urban-type settlement Medvenka, 8 km (5.0 mi) from the selsoviet center – 1st Gostomlya.

Climate

Blagodatnoye has a warm-summer humid continental climate (Dfb in the Köppen climate classification).

== Transport ==
Blagodatnoye is located 22 km (14 mi) from the federal route M-2 Crimea Highway (a part of the European route E105), on the road of regional importance 38K-004 (Dyakonovo – Sudzha – border with Ukraine), 19 km (12 mi) from the nearest railway halt 439 km (railway line Lgov I — Kursk).

The rural locality is situated 49 km (30 mi) from Kursk Vostochny Airport, 109 km (68 mi) from Belgorod International Airport and 245 km (152 mi) from Voronezh Peter the Great Airport.
