= Bohdanivka, Volnovakha Raion, Donetsk Oblast =

Bohdanivka Богданівка
- Village
- Interactive map of Bohdanivka
- Location of Bohdanivka within Ukraine Bohdanivka (Ukraine)
- Coordinates: 47.627778°N 37.756389°E
- Country: Ukraine
- Oblast: Donetsk Oblast
- Raion: Volnovakha Raion
- Hromada: Olhynka settlement hromada

Area
  - Total: 0.53 km^{2} (0.20 sq mi)
- Elevation: 179 m (587 ft)

Population (2001 census)
  - Total: 115
  - Density: 220/km^{2} (560/sq mi)
- Time zone: UTC+2 (EET)
  - Summer (DST): UTC+3 (EEST)
- Postal code: 85734
- Area code: +380 6244

Bohdanivka (Ukrainian: Богданівка; Russian: Богдановка) is a village in Volnovakha Raion (district) of Donetsk Oblast, in eastern Ukraine, 57.7 km SSW from the centre of Donetsk city.

The War in Donbas, which started in mid-April 2014, has caused civilian and military casualties. Three Ukrainian servicemen were killed at the village on 27 June 2018.

== Demographics ==
As of the 2001 Ukrainian census, the settlement had 90 inhabitants, whose native languages were:

- Ukrainian – 53.33%
- Russian – 45.56%
