= Blagodatnoye mine =

Gold mine in Russia

- Interactive map of Blagodatnoye mine

Location
- Location: Krasnoyarsk Krai, Russia; 60.0214°N 92.9922°E

Production
- Products: Gold

History
- Opened: 2010

The Blagodatnoye mine is one of the largest gold mines in Russia and in the world. The mine is located in Krasnoyarsk Krai. The mine has estimated reserves of 11.39 million oz of gold.
