= Mykolaivka, Volnovakha Raion, Donetsk Oblast =

Mykolaivka Миколаївка
- Village
- Interactive map of Mykolaivka
- Location of Mykolaivka within Ukraine Mykolaivka (Ukraine)
- Coordinates: 47.651944°N 37.678333°E
- Country: Ukraine
- Oblast: Donetsk Oblast
- Raion: Volnovakha Raion
- Hromada: Olhynka settlement hromada

Area
  - Total: 4.27 km^{2} (1.65 sq mi)
- Elevation: 156 m (512 ft)

Population (01.01.2017)
  - Total: 1,255
  - Density: 294/km^{2} (761/sq mi)
- Time zone: UTC+2 (EET)
  - Summer (DST): UTC+3 (EEST)
- Postal code: 85734
- Area code: +380 6244
- KATOTTH: UA14040110090011390

Mykolaivka (Ukrainian: Миколаївка; Russian: Николаевка) is a village in Olhynka settlement hromada, Volnovakha Raion, Donetsk Oblast of eastern Ukraine, at 51.1 kilometres (31.8 mi) south-southwest (SSW) from the centre of Donetsk city. The village was captured by Russian forces during the Russo-Ukrainian war on 25 February 2022.

== Demographics ==
The settlement had 1,500 inhabitants in 2001. Native language distribution as of the Ukrainian Census of 2001:

- Ukrainian: 85.19%
- Russian: 14.68%
- Armenian and Moldovan (Romanian): 0.07%

== Notable people ==
- Ivan Dziuba (1931-2022), Ukrainian activist and Soviet dissident
