= Zuivska Power Station =

Ukrainian thermal power station

Zuivska power station
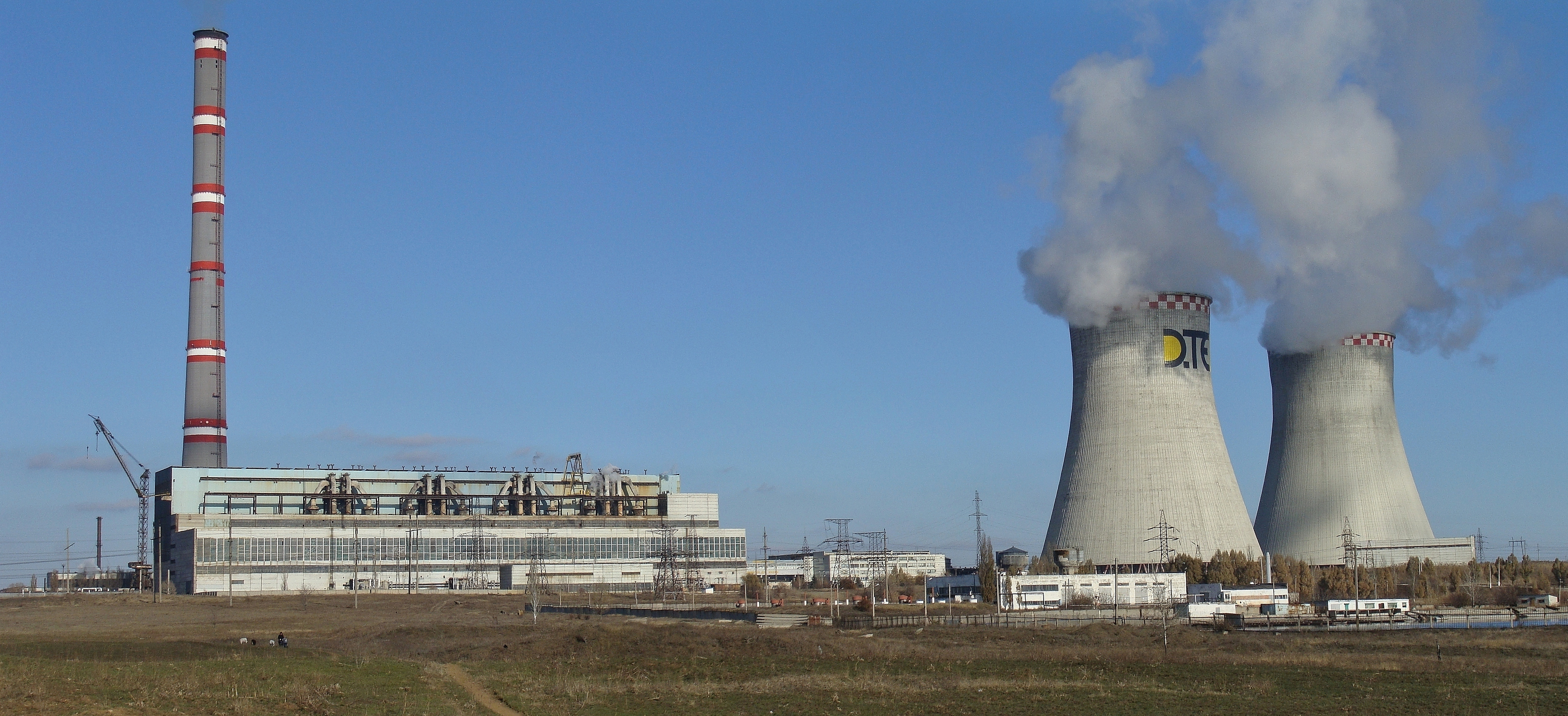
- Official name: Зуївська ТЕС
- Country: Ukraine
- Location: Zuhres, Donetsk Oblast
- Coordinates: 48°2′5″N 38°17′6.11″E
- Status: Operational
- Commission date: 1982
- Owner: Vostokenergo

Thermal power station
- Primary fuel: Coal

Power generation
- Units operational: 3 x 300 MW; 1 x 320 MW
- Make and model: TAGMET; LMZ; Electrotyazhmash
- Nameplate capacity: 1,220 Zaporizhzhia thermal power station

External links
- Website: don.energy
- Commons: Related media on Commons

Zuivska power station (also known as Zuivska TES, Ukrainian: Зуївська ТЕС) is a thermal power station at Zuhres in Donetsk Oblast, Ukraine. It has a 330 metres (1,080 ft) tall flue gas stack, which is the tallest free-standing structure in Ukraine.

== See also ==
- List of power stations in Ukraine
