= Blahodatne, Beryslav Raion, Kherson Oblast =

Blahodatne Благодатне
- Village
- Interactive map of Blahodatne
- Location of Blahodatne within Ukraine Blahodatne (Ukraine)
- Coordinates: 47°28′23″N 33°19′07″E
- Country: Ukraine
- Oblast: Kherson Oblast
- Raion: Beryslav Raion
- Hromada: Vysokopillia settlement hromada

Area
  - Total: 5.62 km^{2} (2.17 sq mi)
- Elevation: 29 m (95 ft)

Population (2001 census)
  - Total: 55
  - Density: 9.8/km^{2} (25/sq mi)
- Time zone: UTC+2 (EET)
  - Summer (DST): UTC+3 (EEST)
- Postal code: 74021
- Area code: +380 5535

Blahodatne (Ukrainian: Благодатне), formerly Gnadenfeld (Ukrainian: Ґнаденфельд), is a village in southern Ukraine, in Vysokopillia settlement hromada, Beryslav Raion, Kherson Oblast. Its population is 55.

== History ==
The village was founded in 1877. It was originally named after the Molotschna colony of Gnadenfeld. Many people came from the Mennonite congregations of Tiege. On 7 November 1917 in accordance with the Third Universal of the Ukrainian Central Rada the village became part of the Ukrainian People's Republic. Prior to this, it was part of the Kherson Governorate in the Kherson uezd of the Russian Empire. When the Soviets took over in 1918, it became part of the Mykolaiv Oblast as part of a German district. During the Great Patriotic War, many residents were deported due to either the Holocaust by the Germans or the Mennonite Germans that resided in the village by the Soviets.

Until 17 July 2020, it was located in Vysokopillia Raion, when that raion was abolished and its territory merged into Beryslav Raion. In November 2022 the village was liberated by Ukrainian forces during the 2022 Kherson counteroffensive under the 59th Assault Brigade and the 9th Unmanned Systems Brigade. However, it continues to be the target of shelling by Russian forces, especially in February 2024.

== Demographics ==
According to the 2001 Ukrainian Census, the only official census taken in post-independence Ukraine, the population of the village was 55 people. Of the people residing in the village, their mother tongue is as follows:

Language	Percentage of Population
Ukrainian	94.55%
Russian	5.45%
