= Blahodatne, Khartsyzk urban hromada, Donetsk Raion, Donetsk Oblast =

Urban locality in Donetsk Oblast, Ukraine

Blahodatne Благодатне
- Rural settlement
- Interactive map of Blahodatne
- Location of Blahodatne within Donetsk Oblast#Location of Blahodatne within Ukraine Blahodatne (Ukraine)
- Coordinates: 47°58′13″N 38°12′33″E
- Country: Ukraine
- Oblast: Donetsk Oblast
- Raion: Donetsk Raion
- Hromada: Khartsyzk urban hromada
- Elevation: 153 m (502 ft)

Population (2019)
  - Total: 36
- Time zone: UTC+2 (EET)
  - Summer (DST): UTC+3 (EEST)
- Postal code: 86790
- Area code: +380 6257

Blahodatne (Ukrainian: Благодатне) prior to 2016 named Voikove (Ukrainian: Войкове), is a rural settlement in Khartsyzk urban hromada, Donetsk Raion, Donetsk Oblast, eastern Ukraine.

== Demographics ==
Native language as of the Ukrainian Census of 2001:

- Ukrainian 19.67%
- Russian 80.33%
