= Amvrosiivka Raion =

Former subdivision of Donetsk Oblast, Ukraine, in use by Russia

Amvrosiivs'kyi Raion Амвросіївський район (Ukrainian) Амвросиевский район (Russian) Amvrosiyevsky District
- Raion
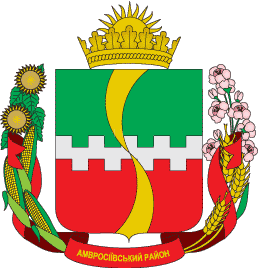
- Flag Coat of arms

- Coordinates: 47°49′12″N 38°28′12″E
- Country: Ukraine
- Region: Donetsk Oblast
- Established: 7 March 1923
- Disestablished: 18 July 2020 (de jure)
- Admin. center: Amvrosiivka
- Subdivisions: List: — city councils; — settlement councils; — rural councils; Number of localities: — cities; — urban-type settlements; 73 — villages; — rural settlements

Government
  - Governor (de-facto): Igor Lyzov (Russian installed)

Area
  - Total: 1,455 km^{2} (562 sq mi)

Population (2020)
  - Total: 43,759
  - Density: 30.07/km^{2} (77.89/sq mi)
- Time zone: UTC+02:00 (EET)
  - Summer (DST): UTC+03:00 (EEST)
- Postal index: 873-XX
- Area code: 380
- Website: Verkhovna Rada website https://amvrosievka-r897.gosweb.gosuslugi.ru/ (Russian administered)

Amvrosiivka Raion (Ukrainian: Амвросіївський район) or Amvrosiyevsky District (Russian: Амвросиевский район) was a raion (district) within the eastern part of Donetsk Oblast in eastern Ukraine. The raion was abolished on 18 July 2020 as part of the administrative reform of Ukraine, which reduced the number of raions of Donetsk Oblast to eight. However, since 2014, the raion has not been under control of the Ukrainian government and has been part of the Donetsk People's Republic which continues using it as an administrative unit. The administrative center of the raion is the town of Amvrosiivka. The last estimate of the raion population, reported by the Ukrainian government, was 43,759 (2020 est.). In 2022, the Donetsk People's Republic including the Amvrosiivka Raion was annexed by Russia.

== Geography ==
The raion has an international border with the Russian Federation (Rostov Oblast) to its east and south, Starobesheve Raion to its southwest, cities of Donetsk and Makiivka to the west, and Shakhtarsk Raion to its north. The border with Russia stretches here for 73 kilometres (45 mi). The raion was established on 7 March 1923 as a part of Taganrog Uyezd (county), Donetsk Governorate initially, a month later it was included into the Stalino Okruha (Yuzivka, at first). Eventually the raion became a part of the Donetsk Oblast.

The raion is located in the southern portion of the Donetsk Ridge and its territory belongs to a steppe zone of Ukraine. On the territory of the raion are located following natural landmarks:

- Gultch Horka - here can be found eremurus of the Ice Age
- Regional landscape park "Donetsk Ridge"
- Berdyanka tract, a part of the Berdyansk State Reserve
- Pristenske tract, a local reserve
- Gultch Kazenna, an archaeological landmark of Paleolithic period

Within the Amvrosiivka Raion there is: one city (Amvrosiivka), 3 urban-type settlements (Kuteynykove, Novoamvrosiivs'ke, and Voykovskyi), 30 selsoviets, and 43 settlements. Also included within the raion are: 14 industrial organizations, 4 construction and transport organizations, 12 kolhozy, 11 sovhozy, 2 pizza companies, 10 hospitals, 35 schools, 24 clubs, 38 libraries and music schools.

An architectural monument in the raion is the Ioanno-Bohoslovska Church (1905-selo Vasyl'evka). Before 1917, the raion was part of the Don Host Oblast in the Russian Empire.

== Settlements ==
- Voikovskyi (Ukrainian: Войковський; formerly: since the 19th century-1940 Kapany) is an urban-type settlements (townlet) with a population of 1,476. A brick factory by the name of Voikova lies within the city, formerly known as Metallist, as well as 2 libraries.
- Kuteinykove (Ukrainian: Кутейникове; since 1878) is an urban-type settlement (townlet) with a population of 2,156. The town comprises the Bondaryevskoe, Zaliznichnoe, Zerkalnoe, Klenovka, Merzhki, Metallist, Petrenki, Pobeda and Svobodnoe settlements.
- Novoamvrosiivske (Ukrainian: Новоамвросіївське; since the 19th century) is an urban-type settlements (townlet) with a population of 2,582. A hospital, and 2 libraries are located within the city.
- Blahodatne (Ukrainian: Благодатне; in 1801-1926 Amvrosiivka) is a selo (village) with a population of 3,648. Blahodatne is a former kolkhoz, Kalinina. A hospital, and 2 libraries are located within the city. The city comprises the Velikoe Mishkove, Zhukova Balka, Kotovskogo, Mala Shishovka, Novoklinovka, Novopetrovka, Podniki, Svistuny and Seyatel' settlements.

== Demographics ==
As of the Ukrainian Census of 2001:

Ethnicity

- Ukrainians: 71.0%
- Russians: 26.2%
- Belarusians: 0.6%
- Armenians: 0.5%

Language

- Russian: 55.8%
- Ukrainian: 43.5%

== See also ==
- Administrative divisions of Donetsk Oblast
