= Novotroitske, Volnovakha Raion, Donetsk Oblast =

Rural settlement in Donetsk Oblast, Ukraine

Novotroitske Новотроїцьке
- Rural settlement
- Interactive map of Novotroitske
- Location of Novotroitske within Ukraine Novotroitske (Ukraine)
- Coordinates: 47°43′2″N 37°34′34″E
- Country: Ukraine
- Oblast: Donetsk Oblast
- Raion: Volnovakha Raion
- Founded: 1834
- Elevation: 186 m (610 ft)

Population (2022)
  - Total: 6,296
- Time zone: UTC+2 (EET)
  - Summer (DST): UTC+3 (EEST)
- Postal code: 85732–85733
- Area code: +380 6244

Novotroitske (Ukrainian: Новотроїцьке; Russian: Новотроицкое) is a rural settlement in Volnovakha Raion, Donetsk Oblast, eastern Ukraine. It is located 34.4 kilometres (21.4 mi) southwest from the center of the city of Donetsk. Population: 6,296 (2022 estimate).

== History ==
The settlement was founded in the first half of the 19th century.

As of 15 February 2022, nine days prior to the 2022 Russian invasion of Ukraine, the settlement was under Ukrainian control. By 13 March, Russian state media released footage which it claimed showed that the settlement was under the control of the Donetsk People's Republic.

== Demographics ==
Native language composition according to the 2001 Ukrainian census:

Native languages in Novotroitske
	percent
Ukrainian	68.2%
Russian	30.8%
Belarusian	0.2%
Armenian	0.2%
Greek	0.1%
Romani	0.1%
others	0.3%
