= Blahodatne, Olhynka settlement hromada, Volnovakha Raion, Donetsk Oblast =

Rural settlement in Donetsk Oblast, Ukraine

Blahodatne Благодатне
- Rural settlement
- Interactive map of Blahodatne
- Location within Donetsk Oblast Location within Ukraine
- Coordinates: 47°41′59″N 37°25′08″E
- Country: Ukraine
- Oblast: Donetsk Oblast
- Raion: Volnovakha Raion
- Hromada: Olhynka settlement hromada
- Highest elevation: 215 m (705 ft)
- Lowest elevation: 201 m (659 ft)

Population (2022)
  - Total: 1,023
- Time zone: UTC+2 (EET)
  - Summer (DST): UTC+3 (EEST)

Blahodatne (Ukrainian: Благодатне) is a rural settlement in Volnovakha Raion, Donetsk Oblast, Ukraine. It belongs to Olhynka settlement hromada, one of the hromadas of Ukraine. Population: 1,023 (2022 estimate).

== History ==
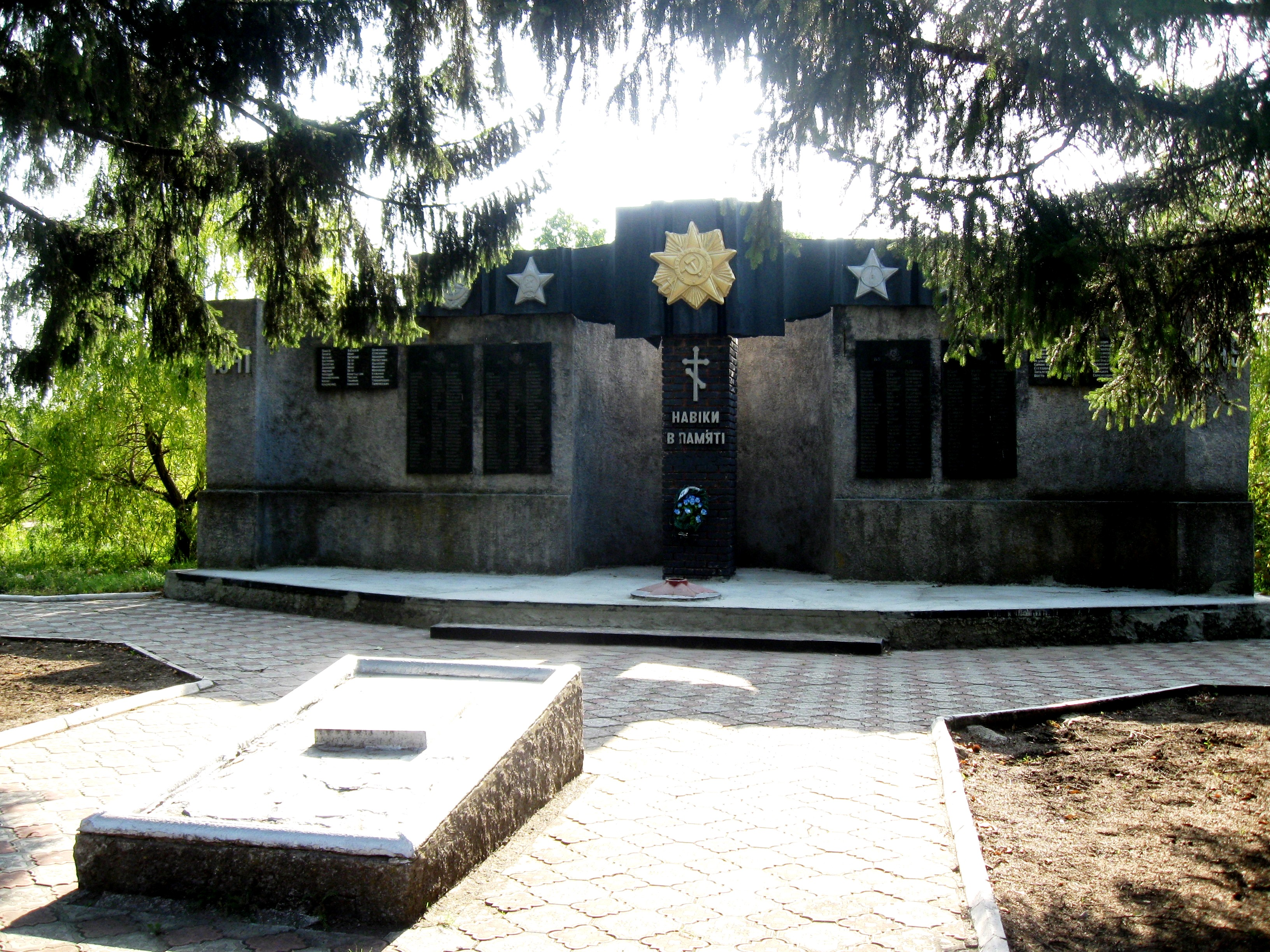
World War II memorial

Blagodatne was founded in 1840. During the Ukrainian War of Independence, fierce battles took place near the settlement between Bolshevik forces and the Volunteer Army led by Pyotr Wrangel.

In 1853, local residents built the first wooden temple in dedication to the Annunciation of the Virgin Mary. The church served the community until it was closed by the Soviet regime in 1961, and converted into a dance club and library. The community fought to keep the church open, and it was finally restored to a working condition in the 1990s, after the dawn of Ukrainian independence. The church is an atypical representative of classical architecture, with a single-seat cruciform central-domed building and a restored belfry. The church can be reached by car or intercity transport and is located in the center of the village.

In 1920, a KNS was created. During the Soviet times, the settlement had the central manor of the "Road to Communism" collective farm, which was known for its meat and dairy livestock breeding, as well as its production of cereals, such as winter wheat. In 1938, Blagodatne was granted the status of an urban-type settlement.

=== Russo-Ukrainian War ===
On November 7, 2014, during the war in Donbas, Ukrainian border guards repelled an attack by a group of armed men near Blahodatne. The incident took place around midnight, when the movement of 12 armed men was detected using a thermal imager. After several warning shots were fired, fire was opened to defeat the enemy, who then retreated.

In November 2022, Ukrainian military forces retook the village of Blahodatne from Russian-backed forces during the Russian invasion of Ukraine. The Ukrainian Armed Forces claimed to have repelled an attack on Blahodatne and 13 other settlements in the eastern part of the Donetsk region. In January 2023, the Russian-aligned Wagner Group private military group took control of the settlement. The exact line of contact in the Donetsk region was unclear due to the heat of the fighting, especially in the town of Bakhmut where some of the heaviest fighting was taking place. The situation along the front line was described as challenging, with 17 people wounded and 4 civilians killed in Russian attacks on the region.

== Demographics ==
Native language as of the 2001 Ukrainian census.

Language	Percentage of population
Ukrainian	88.33%
Russian	11.21%
Belarusian and Moldovan (Romanian)	0.15%

== Geography ==
Its elevation is variously recorded as 215 m and 201 m.

=== Climate ===
Climate chart (precipitation, max. and min. temperature)
J	F	M	A	M	J	J	A	S	O	N	D
48 −1 −6	39 1 −6	48 7 −2	49 15 4	61 21 11	65 25 15	49 28 18	37 28 17	43 21 12	41 13 6	42 6 0	48 1 −3
- █ Average max. and min. temperatures in °C
- █ Precipitation totals in mm
- Source: Climate-Data.org
Imperial conversion
J	F	M	A	M	J	J	A	S	O	N	D
1.9 31 21	1.5 33 22	1.9 44 29	1.9 58 40	2.4 70 51	2.6 78 59	1.9 82 64	1.5 82 63	1.7 71 54	1.6 56 42	1.7 43 33	1.9 34 26
- █ Average max. and min. temperatures in °F
- █ Precipitation totals in inches
