= Amvrosiivka =

City in Donetsk Oblast, Ukraine

Amvrosiivka Амвросіївка Амвросиевка
- City
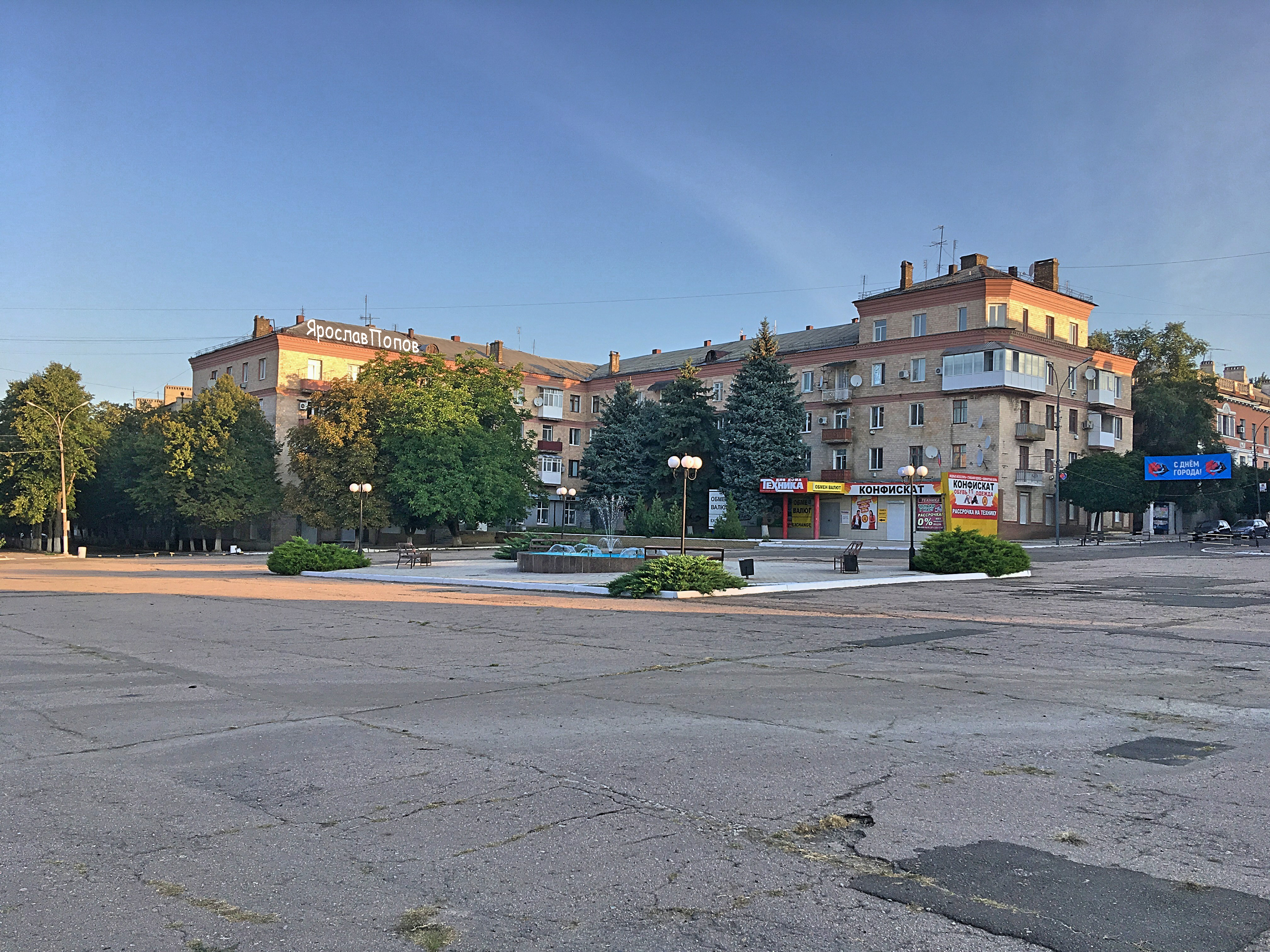
- Central square

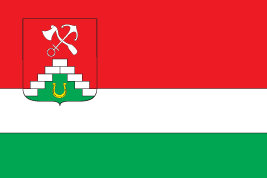
- Flag Seal
- Interactive map of Amvrosiivka
- Location within Donetsk Oblast Location within Ukraine
- Coordinates: 47°47′N 38°29′E
- Country: Ukraine
- Oblast: Donetsk Oblast
- Raion: Donetsk Raion
- Hromada: Amvrosiivka urban hromada
- Founded: 1869
- City status: 1938

Area
  - Total: 19.4 km^{2} (7.5 sq mi)

Population (2022)
  - Total: 17,998
- Climate: Dfa
- Website: https://www.slavrada.gov.ua/

Amvrosiivka (Ukrainian: Амвросіївка, IPA: [ɐmˈwrɔs⁽ʲ⁾ijiu̯kɐ]) or Amvrosievka (Russian: Амвросиевка) is a city in Donetsk Raion, Donetsk Oblast, Ukraine; residence of Amvrosiivka urban hromada. It was the administrative center of Amvrosiivka Raion until the raion was abolished in 2020. As of January 2021, the population was approximately 17,998 (2022 estimate). It is currently occupied by Russian forces.

== History ==
It was first founded in 1869 as a train station settlement on the Kursk-Kharkiv-Azov Railway, and it received city status in 1938. Since 1896, a cement factory is located within the city, and cement production has been the dominant industry of the city. Also located within the city was a history museum, industrial technical school, 6 schools, 11 libraries, 9 hospitals, a pharmacy, a movie theater, a club, and a sport stadium.

During the Ukrainian War of Independence, from 1917 to 1920, it passed between various factions. Afterwards, it was administratively part of the Donets Governorate of Ukraine.

The city's population peaked at approximately 24,400 in 1979. By 2020, the State Statistics Service of Ukraine estimated the population has decreased to 18,047 (2021 est.).

With the start of the Russo-Ukrainian War, on 15 July 2014, two Ukrainian soldiers were killed and eight wounded when Amvrosiivka was hit by several "Grad" rockets. On 24 August 2014, the city was occupied by Russian paratroopers, supported by 250 armoured vehicles and artillery pieces.

On 18 August 2022, during the Russian invasion of Ukraine, a large Russian ammunition store in Amvrosiivka was attacked causing many explosions and fires that burned for several hours. After 2:30 am local time, there were "massive explosions [followed by] multiple secondary detonations."

== Geography ==
=== Climate ===
Climate data for Amvrosiivka (1981–2010)
Month	Jan	Feb	Mar	Apr	May	Jun	Jul	Aug	Sep	Oct	Nov	Dec	Year
Mean daily maximum °C (°F)	−1.1 (30.0)	−0.6 (30.9)	5.5 (41.9)	14.9 (58.8)	21.5 (70.7)	25.7 (78.3)	28.1 (82.6)	27.7 (81.9)	21.4 (70.5)	13.6 (56.5)	5.0 (41.0)	−0.1 (31.8)	13.5 (56.3)
Daily mean °C (°F)	−3.9 (25.0)	−3.8 (25.2)	1.5 (34.7)	9.7 (49.5)	15.9 (60.6)	20.2 (68.4)	22.6 (72.7)	21.8 (71.2)	16.1 (61.0)	9.0 (48.2)	1.7 (35.1)	−2.6 (27.3)	9.0 (48.2)
Mean daily minimum °C (°F)	−6.2 (20.8)	−6.6 (20.1)	−1.9 (28.6)	5.1 (41.2)	10.7 (51.3)	15.0 (59.0)	17.3 (63.1)	16.3 (61.3)	10.8 (51.4)	5.1 (41.2)	−0.7 (30.7)	−5.1 (22.8)	5.0 (41.0)
Average precipitation mm (inches)	52.0 (2.05)	48.2 (1.90)	46.0 (1.81)	41.5 (1.63)	52.3 (2.06)	65.3 (2.57)	58.6 (2.31)	37.6 (1.48)	43.5 (1.71)	38.9 (1.53)	52.5 (2.07)	57.7 (2.27)	592.1 (23.31)
Average precipitation days (≥ 1.0 mm)	9.9	8.2	8.3	7.0	7.1	7.9	6.1	4.4	5.4	5.6	7.7	10.1	87.7
Average relative humidity (%)	87.9	85.6	79.9	67.1	62.1	63.7	61.5	59.4	67.0	76.4	86.8	89.3	73.9
Source: NOAA

== Demographics ==
As of the 2001 Ukrainian census, the city had a population had a population of 21,861 inhabitants. The majority of the population are ethnic Ukrainians, while people who declared an ethnic Russian background make up a large minority. The lingua franca in the settlement is Russian. The exact ethnic and linguistic composition was as follows:

Ethnic groups in Amvrosiivka
	percent
Ukrainians	63.25%
Russians	33.67%
Armenians	0.75%
Belarusians	0.58%
Greeks	0.19%
Georgians	0.17%
Azerbaijanis	0.16%
Moldovans	0.14%
Tatars	0.13%
others	0.96%

First languages in Amvrosiivka
	percent
Russian	71.3%
Ukrainian	27.9%
Armenian	0.3%
Belarusian	0.1%
Romani	0.1%
others	0.3%
