= Novopavlivka offensive =

2025 offensive in the Russo-Ukrainian war

- Part of the eastern front of the Russo-Ukrainian war (2022–present)
- Map of the offensive as of 28 November 2025
Date	28 March 2025 – 11 February 2026 (10 months and 2 weeks)
Location	Eastern Ukraine: Western Donetsk Oblast; Eastern Dnipropetrovsk Oblast
Result	Inconclusive
Territorial changes	Russia captures 29 villages (Note: Zaporizhzhia (Pokrovsk urban hromada), Rozlyv, Vesele, Preobrazhenka, Troitske, Kotlyarivka, Bahatyr, Odradne, Bohdanivka, Fedorivka, Oleksiivka, Horikhove, Komar, Zaporizhzhia (Komar rural hromada) , Perebudova, Zirka, Zelenyi Kut, Novoukrainka, Piddubne, Myrne, Novokhatske, Dachne, Yalta, Oleksandrohrad, Voskresenka, Zelenyi Hai, Andriivka-Klevtsove, Muravka, Filiya) in Donetsk and Dnipropetrovsk Oblasts, consequently entering the Dnipropetrovsk region for the first time since their 2022 invasion.; Ukraine launches a subsequent counteroffensive

Belligerents
Russia	Ukraine

Units involved
Russian Armed Forces: Russian Ground Forces; 90th Guards Tank Division; 114th Guards Motor Rifle Brigade; 36th Guards Motor Rifle Brigade; 37th Guards Motor Rifle Brigade; 74th Guards Motor Rifle Brigade; Russian Aerospace Forces	Ukrainian Armed Forces: 20th Army Corps; 42nd Mechanized Brigade; 46th Airmobile Brigade

A military engagement between the Russian Armed Forces and Ukrainian Armed Forces for control over the Ukrainian settlement of Novopavlivka and the nearby area began in March 2025 and lasted until early 2026.

== Background ==
Following the Russian capture of Kurakhove and Velyka Novosilka in January 2025, the movement in this sector of the frontline largely stabilised. The Ukrainian military stated that they halted further Russian advances due to a strategic regrouping of their army. While the Institute for the Study of War (ISW) observed a temporary operational pause in Russian offensive operations throughout late January, February and early March. This was confirmed by a decline of Russian assault operations in the first quarter of 2025. Which also resulted in a consecutive monthly decrease of Russian territorial gains.

== Offensive ==
=== Early advances and capture of Bahatyr ===
Towards the end of March 2025, the Russian Armed Forces resumed offensive operations near Pokrovsk. Instead of assaulting the city directly, the attacks were this time aimed westwards. Both the Ukrainian General Staff and the Institute for the Study of War started referring to this sector of the frontline as 'Novopavlivka direction'. On 30 March, Russian troops seized the village of Zaporizhzhia (Pokrovsk urban hromada), located seven kilometers from the Dnipropetrovsk region. At the same time, Russian forces launched an assault west of Kurakhove where they advanced to the eastern outskirts of Rozlyv. The following day, the Russian Defence Ministry said its forces took full control of Rozlyv. Geolocated footage published on 1 April corroborated the Russian seizure of Rozlyv. Simultaneous advances occurred in early April north of Velyka Novosilka, where the Russian military resumed offensive operations along the Mokri Yaly river. Russian troops claimed to have captured Vesele.

Throughout the month of April, Russian forces crawled forward in the fields east of Novopavlivka seizing the settlement of Preobrazhenka. The Ukrainian army noticed an increase of Russian operations in April, both in mechanized and infantry assaults. In the south along the Mokri Yaly river, Ukrainian forces repelled further Russian advances. A local Ukrainian commander stated that the Ukrainian army managed to improve their positions in this sector by regaining control over the village of Dniproenerhiya. At the same time, Russian troops resumed operations near Rozlyv where they advanced to the west along the Vovcha river by 18 April.

The following week, Ukrainian forces were able to repel a Russian motorized assault from Rozlyv towards Bahatyr consisting entirely of motorcycles and civilian vehicles. Elements of the Russian 430th Motorized Rifle Regiment were eventually able to entrench themselves into the southeastern streets of Bahatyr by early May. To the east of Novopavlivka, the Russian army launched several attacks and were able to advance into the eastern part of Troitske. Russia announced the capture of Troitske on 8 May. Geolocated footage indicated that Russian forces took control of central Kotlyarivka by 9 May. Moreover, Russian soldiers advanced into central Bahatyr along Likarniana Street. The Russian push around Kotlyarivka brings Novopavlivka within 10 kilometers (six miles) from the frontline. As a result, the Ukrainian authorities ordered the evacuation of seven villages in the eastern Dnipropetrovsk region.

In mid-May, continued Russian assaults took place near the Dnipropetrovsk – Donetsk border. Meanwhile, in Bahatyr, the Russian military said it had fully captured the village. The ISW assessed on 18 May, based on geoconfirmed footage, that elements of the Russian 36th Motorized Rifle Brigade raised Russian flags in Bahatyr, denoting the seizure of the village. Additional advances occurred southeast of Bohdanivka. The next week, Russian forces started advancements to the west of Bahatyr capturing the village of Odradne. Furthermore, Russian troops were able to secure the settlement of Bohdanivka.

=== Advances along the administrative border of Dnipropetrovsk ===
At the beginning of June 2025, the Russian army resumed offensive operations along the Mokri Yaly river by seizing Fedorivka. The capture of Fedorivka also indicated that Russia took full control of Dniproenerhiya and Vesele. On 8 June, the Russian Defence Ministry announced that its forces had reached the administrative border of the Dnipropetrovsk region. Ukrainian officials denied the Russian statements of their presence inside Dnipropetrovsk, calling the reports "fake". Russian Security Council Deputy Chairperson Dmitry Medvedev stated that Russian forces "began an offensive" inside Dnipropetrovsk Oblast. The following day, the ISW assessed based on geolocated footage that the Russian army had reached the border of Dnipropetrovsk Oblast to the northwest of Horikhove. Additional footage showed the Russian 114th Motorized Rifle Brigade raising flags over Oleksiivka located north of Bahatyr.

A second Russian push into the Dnipropetrovsk region occurred to the north of Odradne where Russian troops were able to cross the Vovcha river taking positions northwest of Novoukrainka, thus cutting the T-0428 Kurakhove – Novopavlivka road. To the east of Novopavlivka, Russian forces seized the village of Horikhove. At the same time, Russian assault units advanced westwards along the H15 highway entering Komar. The Russian Defence Ministry claimed its troops had captured Komar. The ISW assessed that Russian forces had control of the southern and eastern parts of Komar by 16 June. Continued Russian advances along the left bank of the Vovcha river resulted in the capture of Zaporizhzhia village (Komar rural hromada), located north of Komar. The next day, geolocated footage confirmed that elements of the Russian 37th Motorized Rifle Brigade fully seized Komar. In addition, their soldiers were able to cross the Mokri Yaly river and secure the adjacent settlement of Perebudova. To the north of Komar, Russian units raised their flags in the village of Yalta.

In the final days of June, Russian forces expanded their control around Yalta and captured the neighboring village of Zirka. To the northeast of Novopavlivka, Russian troops seized Novomykolaivka located along the Solona river. The Russian army expanded their bridgehead on the northern bank of the Vovcha river securing the settlements of Zelenyi Kut, Novoukrainka and Dachne. The latter becoming the first village in the Dnipropetrovsk region under Russian control. The day after, Ukraine's General Staff refuted the reports of Russian forces crossing into the Dnipropetrovsk Oblast. Moreover, the Ukrainian military denied the Russian seizure of Dachne, stating that the Russian reconnaissance forces were eliminated shortly after they took images inside the locality. Russian assault squads managed to cross the Mokri Yaly river near Zirka by early July. On the western bank of this river its soldiers were able to take control of Piddubne. On the other hand, Ukrainian forces managed to reenter Dachne. North of Piddubne, geolocated footage showed Russian flags over the village of Tolstoi on 9 July.

By mid-July, the Russian army levelled the frontline on the left bank of the Mokri Yaly river with the capture of Myrne. Further north, soldiers of the Russian 36th Motorized Rifle Brigade took control over the village of Novokhatske. Geoconfirmed footage additionally showed that the brigade entrenched themselves into the eastern streets of Zelenyi Hai. In the meantime, units of the Ukrainian 20th Army Corps were able to cross the Vovcha river and recapture Yalta. The Russian military restored control over both Dachne and Yalta in the week after. Furthermore, Russian troops seized the entire settlement of Zelenyi Hai on 26 July.

After a three-week lull, the Russian Armed Forces launched an attack on 14 August to the west of Zelenyi Hai. As a result, its troops were able to seize the village of Andriivka-Klevtsove (formerly Iskra). The following day, geolocated footage showed units of the Russian 36th Motorized Rifle Brigade waving flags in the western part of Oleksandrohrad, indicating Russian control over both Oleksandrohrad and Voskresenka. Ukrainian forces launched a counterattack which resulted in the recapture of Andriivka-Klevtsove and Zelenyi Hai by 24 August. Later that day, the Russian Defence Ministry announced the control over the village of Filiya, located south of Novopavlivka. The ISW assessed that Russian forces advanced into Filiya, though they do not exert control over the entire settlement. In the meantime, the Ukrainian military acknowledged that Russian troops entered the Dnipropetrovsk Oblast and that fighting within the region is ongoing. As a result of territorial losses in the area, the commander of the Ukrainian 20th Army Corps was dismissed by Ukrainian commander-in-chief Oleksandr Syrskyi. Geoconfirmed footage from 14 September showed Russian soldiers operating in Andriivka-Klevtsove and Zelenyi Hai, indicating that Russia regained control over the settlements. To the northeast of Novopavlivka, units of the Russian 35th Motorized Rifle Brigade seized the settlement of Muravka.

By the end of September, Russian forces gained a foothold in the southeastern part of Ivanivka after crossing the Vovcha river north of Zelenyi Hai. An open-source analyst reported on 8 October that the Russian army redeployed a few brigades that were located south of Pokrovsk toward the Novopavlivka direction. The ISW assessed that this may be a preparation for an assault to seize Novopavlivka. Southwest of Novopavlivka, Russian troops fully captured Ivanivka by 23 October and additionally expanded control around Filiya.

=== Failed assaults on Novopavlivka and winter stalemate ===
The Russian army began launching assaults from Filiya toward Novopavlivka itself in November 2025, entering the settlement from the south. Geolocated footage showed Russian forces operating in the eastern and northeastern parts of Novopavlivka by 15 November. Ukrainian volunteer Serhii Sternenko reported that Russian troops had set up a pontoon bridge south of Novopavlivka between the villages of Yalta and Dachne. The Ukrainian military stated that the Russian assault on Novopavlivka was repelled. A video released by the Ukrainian 9th Army Corps showed the destruction of several Russian armored vehicles. By the end of November, Russian forces maintained a presence in the southwestern parts of Novopavlivka. Further to the west, Ukrainian forces recaptured the village of Ivanivka. Due to decreasing temperatures and poor weather conditions, the frontlines around Novopavlivka remained stale for the rest of the winter.

In February 2026, the Ukrainian army launched a counteroffensive in the eastern Dnipropetrovsk region, which later expanded into Donetsk Oblast and the Novopavlivka sector.

== Analysis ==
=== Strategic value ===
Novopavlivka used to be located at a safe distance from the eastern frontline in the first two years of the war. That changed when the Russian army launched an offensive in 2024 towards the Ukrainian city of Pokrovsk, bringing the line of contact only a couple miles away of Novopavlivka. The locality itself is not particularly strategic, though its location just over the border of the Dnipropetrovsk region makes it significant as Russia has not entered this oblast in the first three years of their full-scale invasion. Therefore, it would mainly mark a moral blow for Ukraine, should Russia cross into the Dnipropetrovsk region and seize Novopavlivka.

=== Tactics ===
The offensive witnessed the integration of motorbikes and quadbikes into Russian offensive operations. The Russian Defence Ministry published a video showing its fighters practising the new tactic on a dirt track. The ISW has observed an increased Russian usage of motorcycles in motorized assaults. The formation of small tactical motorcycle squads is an attempt to evade Ukrainian drone attacks. Speed and agility can be seen as advantages of this tactic, though the effort is very risky considering the rider has no protecting armor when struck.

== See also ==
- Battle of Chasiv Yar
- Battle of Toretsk
- Battle of Vuhledar
