= Volodino =

Volodino (Russian: Володино) may refer to several populated places in Russia:

- Volodino, Vladimir Oblast
- Volodino, Vologda Oblast
- Volodino, Beryozovsky District, Perm Krai
- Volodino, Solikamsky District, Perm Krai

== See also ==
- Volodyne (disambiguation), a list of similar placenames in Ukraine
