= 9th Greek Regiment =

Military unit

- 9-й Греческий полк
- Active: 1918–1919
- Allegiance: Makhnovshchina (1918-19); Ukrainian SSR (1919)
- Branch: Insurgent Army (1918-19); Red Army (1919)
- Type: Partisan regiment
- Size: 2,000
- Part of: 1st Zadneprovskaya Division
- Engagements: Russian Civil War: Ukrainian War of Independence; Battle of Mariupol
- Decorations: Order of the Red Banner

Commanders
- Notable commanders: Vladimir Takhtamyshev

The 9th Greek Regiment was a regiment that was part of the 3rd Infantry Brigade of the 1st Zadneprovskaya Ukrainian Soviet Division, formed on the basis of the Greek detachments of the Revolutionary Insurgent Army of Ukraine in February 1919.

== History ==
In 1918, to fight the rule of Pavlo Skoropadskyi in the Mariupol district of the Yekaterinoslav province, the local Greeks – the Rumeíka and the Urums – formed several rebel groups. In Starohnativka, a detachment was formed headed by Vladimir Feofanovich Takhtamyshev, which operated in the area of Stary Kermenchik, Novo-Petrikovka, Novo-Karakuba and Bolshaya Yanisol. Partisan detachments of Sprutsko, Tsololo and Bogaditsi also operated the area of the Greek villages of Malaya Yanisol, Cherdakly, Makedonovka and Sartana.

In February 1919, the headquarters of the Revolutionary Insurgent Army of Ukraine united most of the Greek detachments. There were up to one and a half thousand rebels in the new formation. On February 21, 1919, the commander of the 2nd Ukrainian Soviet Army, Anatoly Evgenievich Skachkoru, issued an order to form the 1st Zadneprovsk Division. The third brigade of the division consisted of Makhnovist detachments, the Greek regiment under the command of Takhtamyshev became known as the 9th Regiment of the 3rd Brigade. On March 19, the regiment took part in the battle of Mariupol against the White Army, after which Dybenko awarded the 9th Regiment with the honorary Red Banner.

At the end of June 1919, the 9th Regiment occupied a part of the front stretching from Berdyansk to the village of Pokrovskoye. Under Takhtamyshev's command were 2,000 Red Army soldiers, of which 1,200 were without rifles. At the end of 1919, Takhtamyshev's unarmed detachment joined the 14th Army.

== Bibliography ==
- Chop, V. М. (2008). Участь приазовських греків-колоністів у Махновському русi (1918—1921 рр.) (PDF) (in Ukrainian).
- Teper, I. (1924). Махно: от "единого анархизма" к стопам румынского короля (in Russian). Х.
- Belash, Alexander; Belash, Victor (1993). Дороги Нестора Махно (in Russian). Kyiv: RVC "Proza".
