= 503rd Marine Battalion (Ukraine) =

503rd Separate Marine Battalion 701st Separate Marine Battalion (2015-17)
- 503-й окремий батальйон морської піхоти
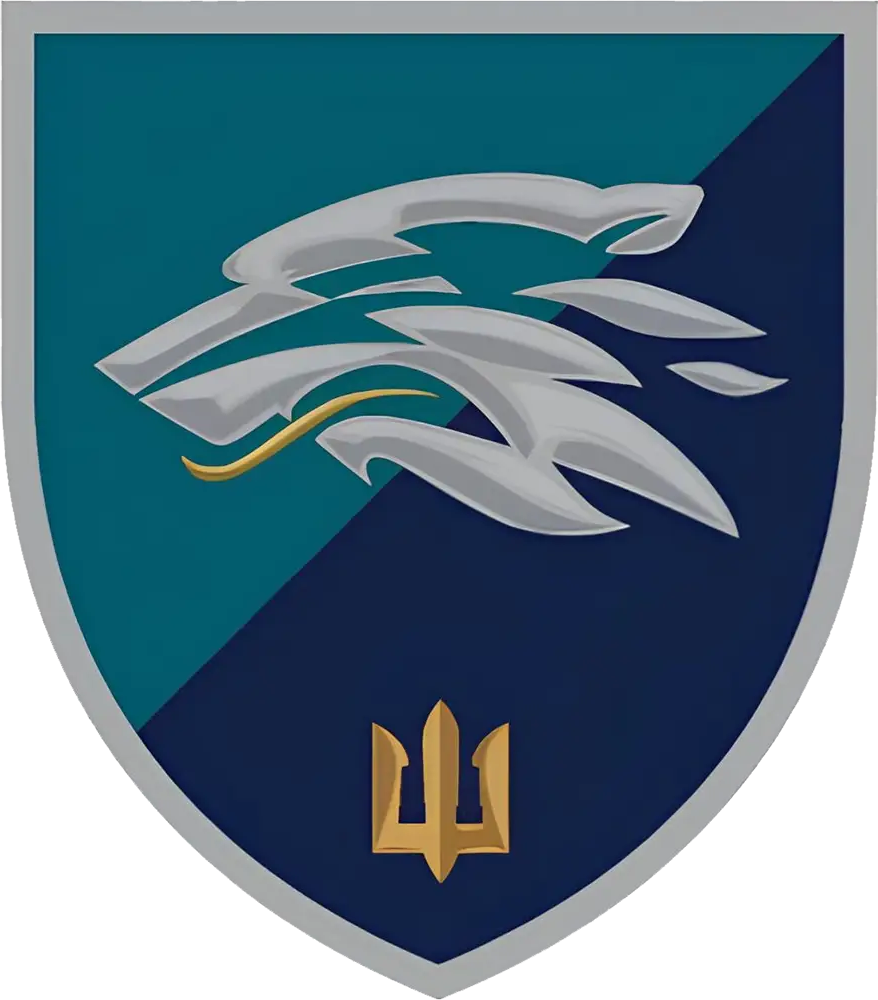
- Battalion insignia
- Founded: 2015
- Country: Ukraine
- Branch: Ukrainian Marine Corps
- Type: Naval infantry
- Role: Amphibious warfare
- Size: Battalion
- Part of: 38th Marine Brigade
- Garrison/HQ: Mariupol
- Engagements: Russo-Ukrainian War; War in Donbas; Russian invasion of Ukraine
- Decorations: For Courage and Bravery

Commanders
- Current commander: Denys Karnaushenko

Insignia
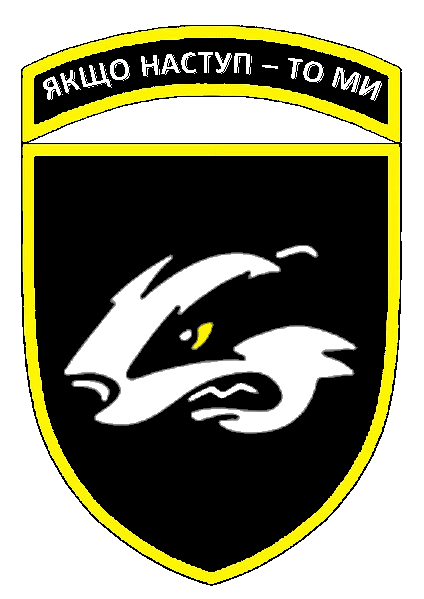
- Former Insignia

- Flag

The 503rd Separate Marine Battalion is a battalion of the 38th Marine Brigade. It was established in late 2015 as a part of the Ukrainian Navy's 36th Marine Brigade as the 701st Marine Battalion but was transferred to the Ukrainian Marine Corps in 2018. It became a part of the 38th Marine Brigade in February 2023 which was established on the basis of the battalion. It was garrisoned at Mariupol.

== History ==
In 2015, it was established as a part of the 36th Marine Brigade as the 701st Marine Battalion. The battalion's combat coordination and training took place near Urzuf.

On September 28, 2016, the battalion received portable electricity production systems. On October 18, 2016, the battalion's posts near the villages of Lebedynske and Vodiane were shelled by separatists killing a soldier of the battalion (Dmytro Andriyovych Zakharov). In 2016, the battalion began the process of technological and organizational modernization and the development of the battalion's own ideology. In late 2016, the battalion matched 250 km after special training and performed operations in the Mariupol's "gray zone". forcing the separatists to retreat 4 km from Mariupol. The battalion made a significant contribution for the capture of Dierzkaya height. Quadcopters were inducted into the unit and it became one of the first Ukrainian battalions to induct UAVs for regular combat purposes.

A soldier (Pronchuk Taras Viktorovych) of the battalion was killed while operating on the post on February 16, 2017 as a result of shelling and firing by the separatists in Vodiane. On February 26, 2017 the battalion's post between Talakivka and Pikuzy was attacked by separatists killing a soldier of the battalion (Roman Dmytrovych Napryaglo). A soldier (Oleksandr Yuriyovych Veremeyenko ) was killed on March 6, 2017 during a three-hour in Vodiane. On March 17, 2017, in another attack on the battalion's position in Vodiane led to the deaths of two soldiers of the battalion (Halaichuk Leonid Leonidovych and Oleksiy Volodymyrovych Kondratyuk) were killed. The battalion's positions in Vodiane were again attacked by separatists on March 20, 2017 but the battalion repelled the attack by two separatists units and counterattacked entering the occupied village of Pikuzy when separatists attacked with heavy artillery, mortars and BM-21 Grads forcing Ukrainians to retreat, two soldiers of the battalion (Dmytro Oleksandrovich Polevy and Vyacheslav Yosypovych Chernetskyi) were killed and five others were wounded. On April 13, 2017, the battalion engaged the separatists near village of Lebedynske during which a soldier of the battalion (Yury Oleksiyovych Derkach) was killed. On June 14, 2017, the battalion was reformed into as the 500th Marine Battalion. On November 16, 2017, the battalion was awarded a combat flag.

On January 30, 2018, the battalion engaged separatist forces in Talakivka during which a soldier of the battalion (Artem Viktorovych Skupeyko) was killed in combat. On February 15 2018, the battalion's positions near Vodiane were again shelled killing a soldier (Oleksandr Vasyliovych Grechuk) of the battalion. The battalion's post in Talakivka was attacked by separatists using RPGs on May 16 2018 killing a soldier (Rud Dmytro Serhiyovych) of the battalion. On June 27 2018, in an attack on battalion's positions near Vodyane, a soldier of the battalion (Fedorov Eduard Yuriyovych) was severely wounded and died five days later. In July 2018, the construction of a new military headquarter for the battalion was initiated. On August 14 2018, the battalion and separatist militants fought in the village of Hnutove during which a soldier of the battalion (Balakhchi Fyodor Fyodorovych) was killed and three more (including a female soldier) were wounded. In September 2018, heavy fighting once again started in Vodiane and on September 5, 2018 a soldier (Maksym Oleksandrovych Avdienko) was killed in a gun fight with militants near the post and another soldier (Serhiy Viktorovych Platonov) was killed on 10 September. In October 2018, the construction of the Battalion headquarter in the former building of boarding school No. 2 in Mariupol was completed. In November 2018, the battalion switched to a new food rationing system.

On April 22, 2019, the commander of the battalion's logistics (Vladyslav Oleksandrovych Sednev) was killed while on duty in the ATO zone and a soldier (Oleksandr Serhiyevich Kobtsov) was killed on June 22 2019 in the same area. In 2019, the battalion, took part in the multinational military exercises Agile Spirit 2019 in Georgia for which Pereyaslav transported the battalion to the port of Poti. After leaving Ukrainian waters it was followed by a Russian warship Kasimov and while returning two Russian ships Zheleznyakov and Naberezhnye Chelny tailed it back to Ukrainian waters.

The battalion fought in the battle for Shumy during which on June 17 2020 a soldier of the battalion (Ilya Mykolayovych Struk) was killed in action and another soldier (Vasyl Serhiyovych Kravchenko) on July 20 2020. Similarly on July 20 2020, another soldier (Overko Kostyantyn Ihorovych) was severely wounded by separatists near the village of Pivdenne and died on September 24 2020 after having undergone more than 30 surgeries.

On 2 February 2021, in yet another engagement in Shumy, a soldier of the battalion (Dmytro Leonidovych Vlasenko) was killed in action. From 19 February 2021, fierce battles broke out again near Horlivka when pro-Russian separatist forces violated the Minsk agreements five times and lasted from the 19th to the 21st of February; multiple casualties were reported on both sides for control of the Western Suburb Region of Mayorsk, the battalion operated in the area of the Yuzhnaya mine and the settlement of Toretsk north of Horlivka and inflicted damage on the separatists with Anatoliy "Shtirlits" Shtefan reporting that the battalion had killed seven separatists near Horlivka while Donetsk People's Republic confirmed five casualties,.the former commandant of Horlivka, Igor Bezler, said that 20 DPR separatists were killed near Horlivka. The battalion also engaged separatists in the village of Verkhniotoretske and on September 12 2021 separatists attacked a truck of the battalion using ATGMs killing a soldier of the battalion (Golub Artur Volodymyrovych).

In March 2022, the battalion fought in the Battle of Volnovakha, the battalion caused significant losses to the Russian forces forcing them to deploy reserves. During the battle the battalion's deputy commander (Chornomorets Oleg Vasyliovych) was killed in action on 9th March and was awarded Hero of Ukraine. The battalion's commander (Pavlo Olegovich Sbytov) was also killed in the battle on 11 March. On 5 April, Kadyrovites published a video claiming that 267 soldiers from the 503rd Battalion surrendered to Russia. Former US Navy SEAL Chuck Pfarrer believed the claim to be spotty, explaining that the captives appeared to be nearly unscathed and wore outfits which did not match the official Ukrainian marines uniform. On June 3, 2022, the battalion was awarded the honorary award "For Courage and Bravery". On October 13, 2022, after an exchange of prisoners of war, 20 soldiers returned to Ukraine including some from the battalion in addition to 808th pontoon-bridge regiment, the 56th separate motorized infantry brigade, the 24th, 53rd, 65th and 92nd separate mechanized brigades, the 46th separate amphibious assault brigade, in the Forces of the TrO. On October 23, 2022, near the village of Opytne, a unit of the battalion performed reconnaissance mission and the unit's commander (Maksym Pavlovich Tokarev) was killed in this operation while saving the lives of others of his unit.

The 38th Marine Brigade was formed out of a basis of the battalion in February 2023 as part of an expansion to the Ukrainian Naval Infantry alongside the 37th Marine Brigade. On August 9 2023 the battalion's medic (Yarish Serhiy Andriyovych) was killed by Russian forces in Urozhaine. On September 8, 2023 during the 2023 Ukrainian counteroffensive, when the Russian forced were concentrating their efforts to the north of the Avdiivka in the Kamianka front, the battalion along with 59th Motorized Brigade conducted a coordinated assault operation at Opytne. They entered the village from north, cleared Russian positions, but they were later pushed back to their original positions. On 23 October 2023, another medic of the battalion (Dmytro Mykhailovych Potapenko) was killed by Russian forces in Kherson Oblast.

== Structure ==
- Management and Headquarters
- 1st Marine Company
- 2nd Marine Company
- Amphibious Assault Company
- Fire Support Company
- Mortar Battery
- Self propelled artillery Battery
- Anti-aircraft artillery Platoon
- Engineering Platoon
- Anti-aircraft missile Platoon
- Reconnaissance platoon
- Sniper platoon
- Material and Technical Platoon
- Medical center

== Commanders ==
- Sukharevsky Vadym Olegovich (2015-2021)
- Sbytov Pavlo Olegovich †(2021-2022)
- Denis Karnaushenko (2022-)

== In popular culture ==
Taras Zhytynsky dedicated the song "About Sahaidachny" to the personnel of the battalion.

== Sources ==
- Будні морпіха. Проект «Захисники Маріуполя»
- Тепер можна: розкриваємо страшні військові таємниці
- 500-й бат «на виході»: як загартовують морпіхів
- У небі, на морі, на суші: народження 503-го окремого батальйону морської піхоти
- "2С1 "Гвоздика" на озброєнні 503 батальйону морської піхоти". mil.in.ua/. Український мілітарний портал. 2017-11-18. Archived from the original on 12 June 2018.
- «БОРСУКИ» ВІДЗНАЧИЛИ ПЕРШУ РІЧНИЦЮ ВІД ДНЯ СТВОРЕННЯ ЧАСТИНИ
