= Oleh Chornomorets =

Ukrainian soldier (1965–2022)

Oleh Chornomorets Олег Чорноморець
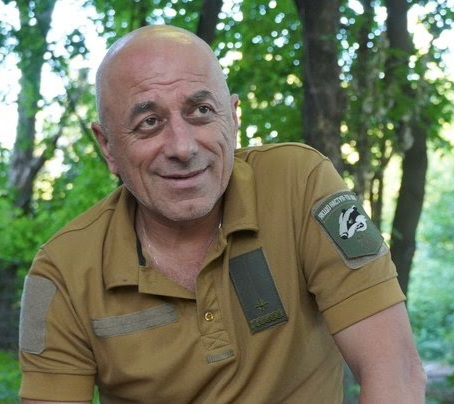
- Born: 25 April 1965; Korosten, Zhytomyr Oblast, Ukrainian SSR, Soviet Union
- Died: 11 March 2022 (aged 56); Zachativka, Donetsk Oblast, Ukraine
- Military career
- Allegiance: Ukraine
- Branch: Ukrainian Navy
- Rank: Major
- Conflicts: Russo-Ukrainian War; Russian invasion of Ukraine
- Awards: Order of the Gold Star (posthumously)

Oleh Vasyliovych Chornomorets (Ukrainian: Олег Васильович Чорноморець; April 25, 1965 — March 11, 2022) was a major in the Armed Forces of Ukraine, a participant in the Russian-Ukrainian war who distinguished himself during the Russian invasion of Ukraine. Hero of Ukraine (2023, posthumously).

== Biography ==
He graduated from the Khmelnytskyi Higher Artillery Command School in 1986. He served in Germany, where he commanded a 122 mm self-propelled artillery battery. In 1990, he retired as a senior lieutenant and worked at the railroad in Korosten.

In March 2014, he was called up for ten days of training to the 95th Airmobile Brigade. He had the right to resign as a father of three, but continued to serve. In 2014, he commanded the "Hvozdyk" battery of 122 mm self-propelled artillery systems in Donetsk region, and later in the 90th separate airmobile battalion (Konstantinivka). On April 17, 2015, he was demobilized.

Subsequently, he was mobilized again, served in the Korosten military commissariat, commanded an anti-tank battery in the 43rd Artillery Brigade.

At the beginning of the full-scale Russian invasion of Ukraine, he was the deputy commander of the 503rd Separate Marine Battalion, which was located in the Mariupol sector.

In March 2022, in the battles near the village of Zachativka, the battalion he commanded inflicted significant losses on the Russian invaders. After the enemy threw reserves into the battle, according to the military unit: "With his last order, the officer called for fire at the coordinates where the largest concentration of occupants was. The artillerymen followed the order of their heroic commander and struck the specified coordinates. The officer never got in touch again. On the same day, it was established that Major Oleh Chornomorets called the fire on himself and died defending his country, giving his own life to save his comrades-in-arms".

== Awards ==
Hero of Ukraine with the Order of the Golden Star (February 23, 2023, posthumously) for personal courage and heroism in the defense of state sovereignty and territorial integrity of Ukraine, selfless service to the Ukrainian people.
