= Kliuchove, Volnovakha Raion, Donetsk Oblast =

Coordinates: 47°40′33″N 36°51′57″E

Kliuchove (Ukrainian: Ключове́) is a rural-type settlement in Staromlynivka rural hromada, Volnovakha Raion, Donetsk Oblast, Ukraine.

== Geography ==
The settlement is located on the banks of the Mokri Yaly river. The dam for a reservoir on the river is located in Kliuchove.

== History ==
Before 2020, Kliuchove was administratively part of Velyka Novosilka Raion. Since 17 July 2020, the settlement has been part of Staromlynivka rural hromada, Volnovakha Raion.

In March 2022, the village was occupied by Russia during the Russian invasion of Ukraine. On 11 June 2023, the dam of the reservoir on the river was reportedly blown up by Russia.

== Demographics ==
According to the 2001 Ukrainian census, Kliuchove has a population of 49 people, of whom 67.35% natively spoke Ukrainian and 30.61% natively spoke Russian.
