= Novoocheretuvate =

Village in Donetsk Oblast, Ukraine

Novoocheretuvate Новоочеретувате
- Village
- Interactive map of Novoocheretuvate
- Location of Novoocheretuvate within Donetsk Oblast Novoocheretuvate (Ukraine)
- Coordinates: 47.898°N 36.812°E
- Country: Ukraine
- Oblast: Donetsk Oblast
- Raion: Volnovakha Raion
- Hromada: Komar rural hromada

Population (2001)
  - Total: 199
- Time zone: UTC+2
  - Summer (DST): UTC+3 (EEST)
- Postal code: 85520
- Area code: +380 6243

Novoocheretuvate (Ukrainian: Новоочеретувате; Russian: Новоочеретоватое) is a village (selo) in Volnovakha Raion, Donetsk Oblast, Ukraine, on the left bank of the Mokri Yaly river. It belongs to the Komar rural hromada. Russian forces captured the village on 20 February 2025.

== Demographics ==
According to the 2001 Census, the village has a population of 199. 88.94% of residents were native Ukrainian speakers, while the remaining 11.06% were native Russian speakers.
