= Fedorivka, Volnovakha Raion, Donetsk Oblast =

Fedorivka Федорівка
- Village
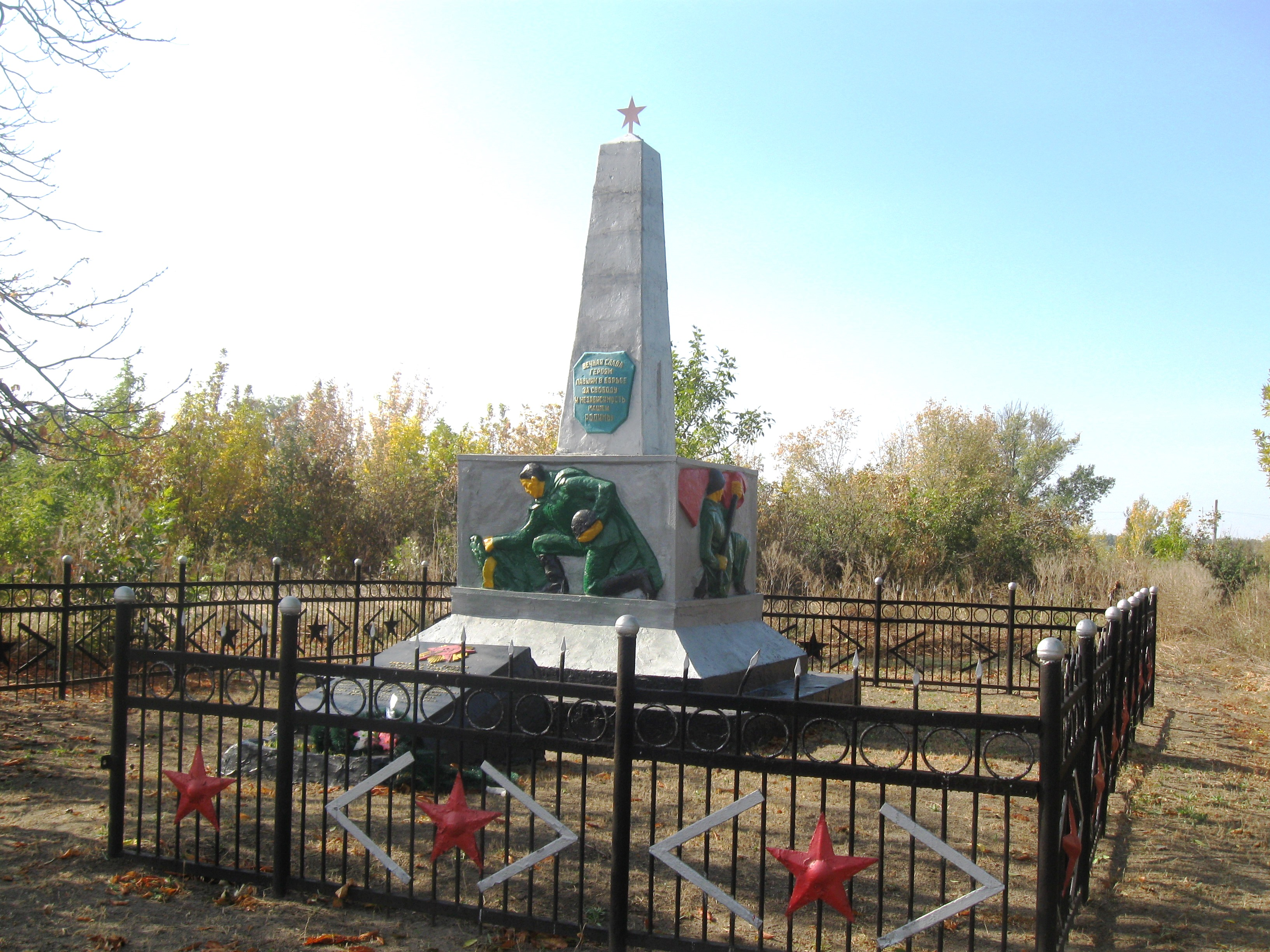
- Mass grave of Soviet soldiers in Fedorivka

- Fedorivka shown within Ukraine Fedorivka (Donetsk Oblast)
- Coordinates: 47°57′0″N 36°45′17″E
- Country: Ukraine
- Oblast: Donetsk Oblast
- Raion: Volnovakha Raion
- Hromada: Komar rural hromada
- Elevation: 98 m (322 ft)

Population (2001)
  - Total: 314
- Postal code: 85520
- Area code: +380 6243

Fedorivka (Ukrainian: Федорівка; Russian: Федоровка) is a village in Volnovakha Raion, Donetsk Oblast, Ukraine. Fedorivka belongs to the Komar rural hromada, 2 kilometres south of Komar.

== Geography ==
Fedorivka is on the west bank of the Mokri Yaly river. The village is 2KM from Komar, and 14KM from Velyka Novosilka.

== History ==
=== Russian invasion of Ukraine ===
On 6 June 2025, during the Russian invasion of Ukraine, the Russian army reportedly captured the village. The Russian Defence Ministry stated on the messaging service Telegram that the village was taken by the "Vostok group".

== Demographics ==
As of the 2001 Ukrainian census, Fedorivka had a population of 314 people. The linguistic distribution of the population was as follows:

Languages in Fedorivka
	percent
Ukrainian	81.2%
Russian	17.5%
Greek	0.3%
others	1.0%
