= Heorhiivka, Volnovakha Raion, Donetsk Oblast =

Coordinates: 47°39′26″N 36°53′55″E

Heorhiivka (Ukrainian: Георгіївка) is a village in southeastern Ukraine, located in Staromlynivka rural hromada, Volnovakha Raion, Donetsk Oblast. It is located 5 miles (8.0 km) to the south of Urozhaine.

Heorhiivka was captured by Russia during the Russian invasion of Ukraine. In the prelude to the 2023 Ukrainian counteroffensive, Russia heavily fortified areas in southern Ukraine, including Heorhiivka. Heorhiivka, along with nearby Urozhaine, was one of the areas where fortifications were at their thickest.
