= Volodyne =

Volodyne (Ukrainian: Володине) may refer to one of two villages in Ukraine:

- Volodyne, Donetsk Oblast
- Volodyne, Crimea

== See also ==
- Volodino (disambiguation), a list of places with the equivalent Russian-language name
