= Kermenchyk =

Rural locality in Donetsk Oblast, Ukraine

Kermenchyk Керменчик
- Rural settlement
- Interactive map of Kermenchyk
- Location of Kermenchyk within Donetsk Oblast Kermenchyk (Ukraine)
- Coordinates: 47°42′38″N 36°56′27″E
- Country: Ukraine
- Oblast: Donetsk Oblast
- District: Volnovakha Raion
- Hromada: Staromlynivka rural hromada

Population (2001)
  - Total: 1,100

Kermenchyk (Ukrainian: Керменчик; Russian: Керменчик, romanized: Kermenchik) is a rural settlement in southeastern Ukraine. Administratively, it is located in Staromlynivka rural hromada, Volnovakha Raion, Donetsk Oblast.

It was founded by settlers from Staryi Kermenchyk, (lit. 'Old Kermenchyk') which is now Staromlynivka.

For some time prior to 2016, it was known as Oktiabrske (Ukrainian: Октябрське; Russian: Октябрьское, romanized: Oktyabrskoye) until it was renamed to its current name as part of decommunization reforms in Ukraine.

== Demographics ==
According to the 2001 Ukrainian census, the population of the settlement was 1110, of whom 66.04% spoke Ukrainian, 33.87% spoke Russian, and 0.09% spoke Greek (including Mariupol Greek and Urum).
