= Zavitne Bazhannia =

Zavitne Bazhannia Завітне Бажання
- Village
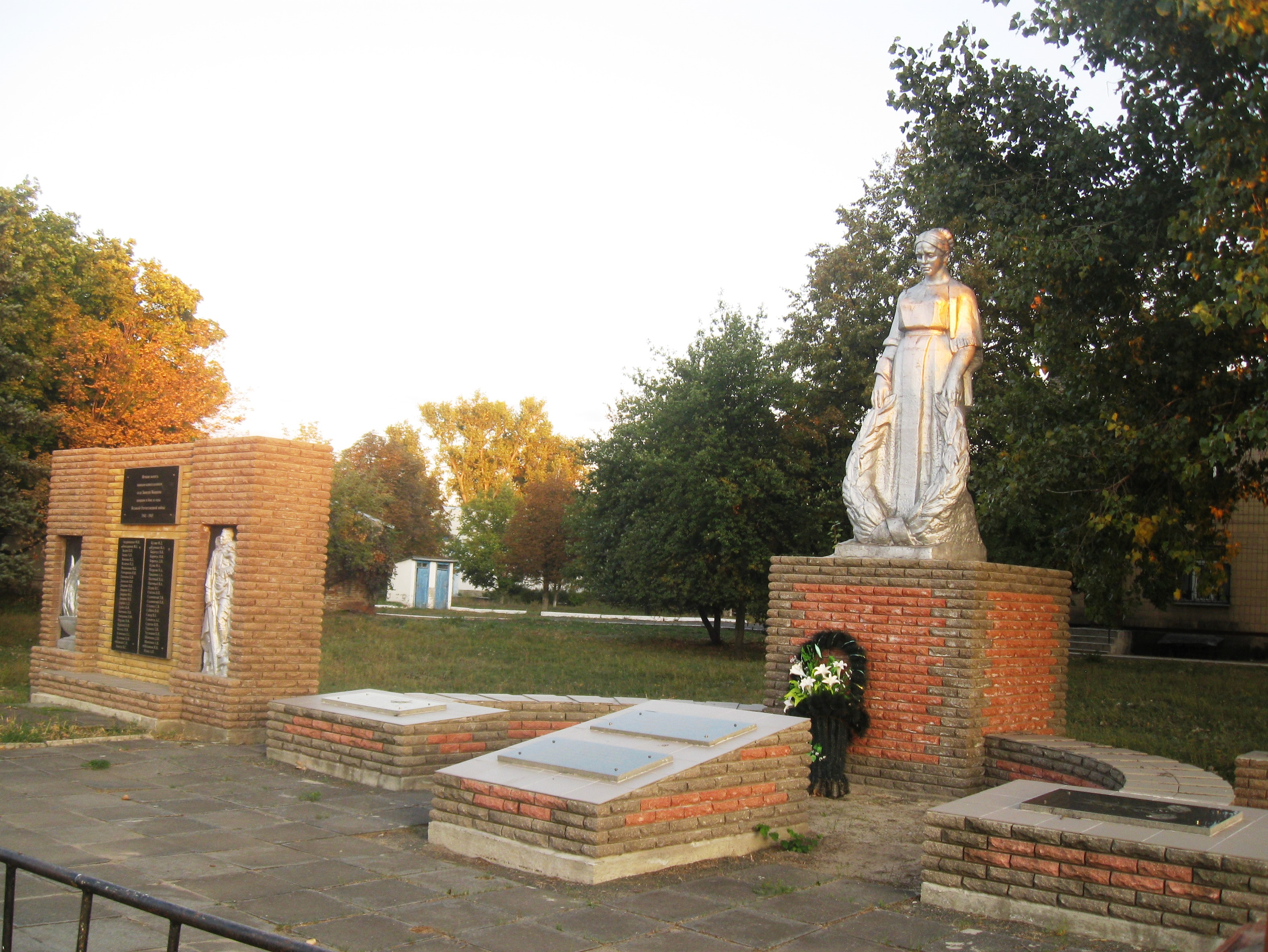
- Monuments to World War II victims in Zavitne Bazhannia

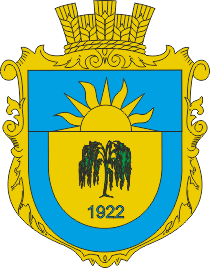
- Coat of arms
- Interactive map of Zavitne Bazhannia
- Location of Zavitne Bazhannia within Donetsk Oblast Zavitne Bazhannia (Ukraine)
- Coordinates: 47°43′15″N 36°48′59″E
- Country: Ukraine
- Oblast: Donetsk Oblast
- Raion: Volnovakha Raion
- Hromada: Staromlynivka rural hromada

Population (2001)
  - Total: 513
- Time zone: UTC+2
  - Summer (DST): UTC+3 (EEST)
- Postal code: 85552
- Area code: +380 6243

Zavitne Bazhannia (Ukrainian: Завітне Бажання; Russian: Завитне Бажання, romanized: Zavitne Bazhannya) is a village in Volnovakha Raion, Donetsk Oblast, Ukraine.

== History ==
=== Russian invasion of Ukraine ===
During the Russian invasion of Ukraine, Zavitne Bazhannia was occupied by Russia. On 7 November 2022, there were reports that 21 Russian mobilized conscripts who had refused to fight in Ukraine were being "held captive" in a basement in Zavitne Bazhannia. According to letters written by the wives and mothers of the servicemen, eight or more of the men had official exemptions from service, yet still had been sent to the warzone "without appropriate training".

Later in the war, during the 2023 Ukrainian counteroffensive, on 8 June 2023 Ukrainian forces destroyed a Russian TOS-1A rocket launcher system just to the north of Zavitne Bazhannia.

== Local government ==
It belongs to the Staromlynivka rural hromada, one of the hromadas of Ukraine.

== Demographics ==
According to the 2001 Census, Zavitne Bazhannia has a population of 513. 87.91% of residents were native Ukrainian speakers, 11.7% were native Russian speakers and 0.19% were native Armenian speakers.
