= Orlynske =

Village in Donetsk Oblast, Ukraine

Coordinates: 47°39′03″N 36°45′55″E

Orlynske (Ukrainian: Орлинське) is a village in southeastern Ukraine, administratively located in Staromlynivka rural hromada, Volnovakha Raion, Donetsk Oblast.

== Demographics ==
As of the 2001 Ukrainian census, the village had a population of 173, of whom 82.66% spoke Ukrainian and 17.34% spoke Russian.
