= Yalynske =

Coordinates: 47°38′37″N 36°56′00″E

Yalynske (Ukrainian: Ялинське) is a village in southeastern Ukraine, located in Staromlynivka rural hromada, Volnovakha Raion, Donetsk Oblast.

The village was captured by Russia during the Russian invasion of Ukraine that began in 2022. In June 2023, the Ukrainian military claimed to have destroyed Russian 2S19 Msta-S systems in the village by using GMLRS-guided rockets.
