= Dniproenerhiia =

Village in Donetsk Oblast, Ukraine

Dniproenerhiia Дніпроенергія
- Village
- Interactive map of Dniproenerhiia
- Location of Dniproenerhiia within Donetsk Oblast Dniproenerhiia (Ukraine)
- Coordinates: 47.922°N 36.801°E
- Country: Ukraine
- Oblast: Donetsk Oblast
- Raion: Volnovakha Raion
- Hromada: Komar rural hromada

Population (2001)
  - Total: 96
- Time zone: UTC+2
  - Summer (DST): UTC+3 (EEST)
- Postal code: 85520
- Area code: +380 6243

Dniproenerhiia (Ukrainian: Дніпроенергія; Russian: Днепроэнергия, romanized: Dneproenergiya) is a village (selo) in Volnovakha Raion, Donetsk Oblast, Ukraine, located on the right bank of the Mokri Yaly river. It belongs to the Komar rural hromada, one of the hromadas of Ukraine.

== Demographics ==
According to the 2001 Census, the village has a population of 96. 73.96% of residents were native Ukrainian speakers, while the remaining 26.04% were native Russian speakers.
