= Bogdan Khmelnitsky Battalion =

- Батальон Богдана Хмельницкого
- Active: February 2023 – Present
- Country: Russia (Per Russia)
- Allegiance: n/a
- Type: Infantry
- Size: Battalion (250 to 1,000 people)
- Part of: Combat tactical formation Kaskad
- Garrison/HQ: n/a
- Patron: Bohdan Khmelnitsky
- Engagements: Russian Invasion of Ukraine: 2023 Ukrainian counteroffensive

Commanders
- Current commander: Andrii Tyshchenko

In February 2023, Russian state-controlled media reported on a formation of the Bogdan Khmelnitsky Battalion (Russian: Батальон Богдана Хмельницкого), or Bohdan Khmelnytsky Battalion, a Russian "volunteer battalion", allegedly from Ukrainian POWs that have defected to the Russian Army. The battalion was named after Bohdan Khmelnytsky, Cossack Hetman of the Zaporozhian Host, who rebelled against the Polish–Lithuanian Commonwealth and later accepted suzerainty of the Tsardom of Russia. Andrii Tyshchenko claimed to be its commander.

Ukrainian intelligence claimed the Russian media reports as propaganda.

== Russian media claims ==
The battalion, according to Russian state-controlled media, was created in February 2023 in the Russian-occupied part of Donetsk Oblast. The formation's alleged commander, Andrii Tyshchenko, told RIA Novosti that they had recruited around 70 Ukrainian POWs in February alone. RIA Novosti calls the battalion "volunteer", claiming that its members joined the formation "voluntarily, having accepted Russian citizenship if they joined the battalion".

Russian sources claimed that the Russian command would treat members of the battalion in the same way as Russian soldiers and that they would receive the same salaries and benefits.

Russian state-controlled sources claimed that in October 2023, the battalion became attached to Russian operational combat tactical formation Cascade. According to Russian press, on 28 December 2023, the battalion engaged Ukrainian forces near the village of Urozhaine.

According to the self proclaimed commander of the battalion, over 95% of the battalion consists of former Ukrainian servicemen with combat experience.

According to the Defense Intelligence of Ukraine, the Russian media reports are more likely a media operation then a real military formation. Ukraine noted that no such unit has been observed operating in combat, but the coercion of POWs into combat by Russia cannot be ruled out in the future. Ukraine characterized reports as a Russian answer to the Freedom of Russia Legion and the Russian Volunteer Corps, units formed in Ukraine from Russian citizens.

== Use of POWs ==
The battalion is allegedly made up of Ukrainian PoWs who have defected to Russia. Coercion of POWs into combat would violate the Article 23 of the Geneva Convention on Prisoners of War, which says that "no prisoner of war may at any time be sent to or detained in areas where he may be exposed to the fire of the combat zone."

It was reported that after taking an oath, the battalion was deployed to an unspecified part of the frontline.

Yulia Gorbunova, senior researcher on Ukraine at Human Rights Watch, said that it was "hard to imagine" that the men of the battalion were taking part of their own free will.
