= Vladimir Takhtamyshev =

Vladimir Feofanovich Takhtamyshev
- Володимир Феофанович Тахтамишев
- Born: 1890s Velyka Novosilka, Yekaterinoslav, Russian Empire
- Died: 1935; Mariupol, Donetsk, Ukrainian SSR
- Military career
- Service: Revolutionary Insurrectionary Army of Ukraine (1918–1919), Red Army (1920–1921)
- Service years: 1918–1921
- Unit: 9th Greek Regiment
- Conflicts: Ukrainian War of Independence

Vladimir Feofanovich Takhtamyshev (1890s–1935) was a Ukrainian Greek participant in the Russian Civil War, as part of the Makhnovist movement.

== Biography ==
Takhtamyshev was appointed to the political committee of the 9th Greek Regiment of the Zadneprovsk division. Takhtamyshev was the only commander that was not elected, but appointed by the command. On 19 March Takhtamyshev took part in the liberation of Mariupol from the White Army. After the liberation of the city, Dybenko awarded the 9th Regiment the Order of the Red Banner.

At the end of June, the Makhnovist regiments occupied a part of the front, stretching from Berdyansk to the village of Pokrovskoye. Under his command were 2,000 Red Army soldiers, of which 1,200 were without rifles. At the end of 1919, Takhtamyshev's unarmed detachment joined the 14th Army and remained in it.

After the end of the civil war, Takhtamyshev settled in Mariupol, where he headed the construction of a fish cannery and became its first director. In 1935 he died from illness.

== Bibliography ==
- Belash, Alexander; Belash, Victor (1993). Дороги Нестора Махно (in Russian). Kyiv: RVC "Proza".
- Chop, V. М. (2008). Участь приазовських греків-колоністів у Махновському русi (1918—1921 рр.) (in Ukrainian).
- Teper, I. (1924). Махно: от «единого анархизма» к стопам румынского короля (in Russian). Х.
