= Volodyne, Donetsk Oblast =

Volodyne Володине
- Village
- Interactive map of Volodyne
- Location of Volodyne within Donetsk Oblast Volodyne (Ukraine)
- Coordinates: 47°41′43″N 36°45′10″E
- Country: Ukraine
- Oblast: Donetsk Oblast
- Raion: Volnovakha Raion
- Hromada: Staromlynivka rural hromada

Population (2001)
  - Total: 286

Volodyne (Ukrainian: Володине) is a village in Staromlynivka rural hromada, Volnovakha Raion, Donetsk Oblast, Ukraine.

The distance from Volodyne to the raion (district) center Volnovakha is approximately 55 kilometres (34 mi).

== History ==
The village was founded as a Jewish agricultural colony. The area of the modern village also includes another formerly separate Jewish agricultural colony, the village Udachne.

Before 2020, the village was located in Velyka Novosilka Raion. Since 17 July 2020, the village has been part of Staromlynivka rural hromada in Volnovakha Raion.

During the 2023 Ukrainian counteroffensive, Volodyne has been one of several directions of attacks by Ukrainian forces, with reported Ukrainian advances taking place in late August 2023.

== Demographics ==
According to the 2001 Ukrainian census, the population of the village was 286, of whom 96.49% spoke Ukrainian and 3.16% spoke Russian.
