= Malyi Kermenchyk =

Village in Donetsk oblast, Ukraine

Coordinates: 47°37′44″N 36°59′33″E

Malyi Kermenchyk (Ukrainian: Малий Керменчик; Russian: Малый Керменчик, romanized: Maly Kermenchik; Urum: Йарцуз, romanized: Yartsuz) is a village in Staromlynivka rural hromada, Volnovakha Raion, Donetsk Oblast, in southeastern Ukraine.

== Demographics ==
According to the 2001 Ukrainian census, the village had a population of 168 people, of whom 79.76% spoke Ukrainian and 20.24% spoke Russian.
