= Zelenyi Hai, Komar rural hromada, Volnovakha Raion, Donetsk Oblast =

Zelenyi Hai Зелений Гай
- Rural settlement
- Location of Zelenyi Hai Zelenyi Hai (Ukraine)
- Coordinates: 48°4′6″N 36°39′7″E
- Country: Ukraine
- Oblast: Donetsk Oblast
- District: Volnovakha Raion
- Hromada: Komar rural hromada
- Elevation: 92 m (302 ft)

Population (2001)
  - Total: 915
- Time zone: UTC+2 (EET)
  - Summer (DST): UTC+3 (EEST)
- Postal code: 85510
- Area code: +380 6243
- Climate: Dfa

Zelenyi Hai (Ukrainian: Зелений Гай) is a rural settlement in Volnovakha Raion, Donetsk Oblast, in eastern Ukraine.

== Local government ==
Until 18 July 2020, Zelenyi Hai was located in Velyka Novosilka Raion. The raion was abolished that day as part of the administrative reform of Ukraine, which reduced the number of raions of Donetsk Oblast to eight, of which only five were controlled by the government. The area of Velyka Novosilka Raion was merged into Volnovakha Raion.

== Demographics ==
Native language as of the Ukrainian Census of 2001:

- Ukrainian 89.40%
- Russian 10.38%

In April 2025, 20 people remained in the settlement.
