= Pavlo Sbytov =

Ukrainian soldier (1994–2022)

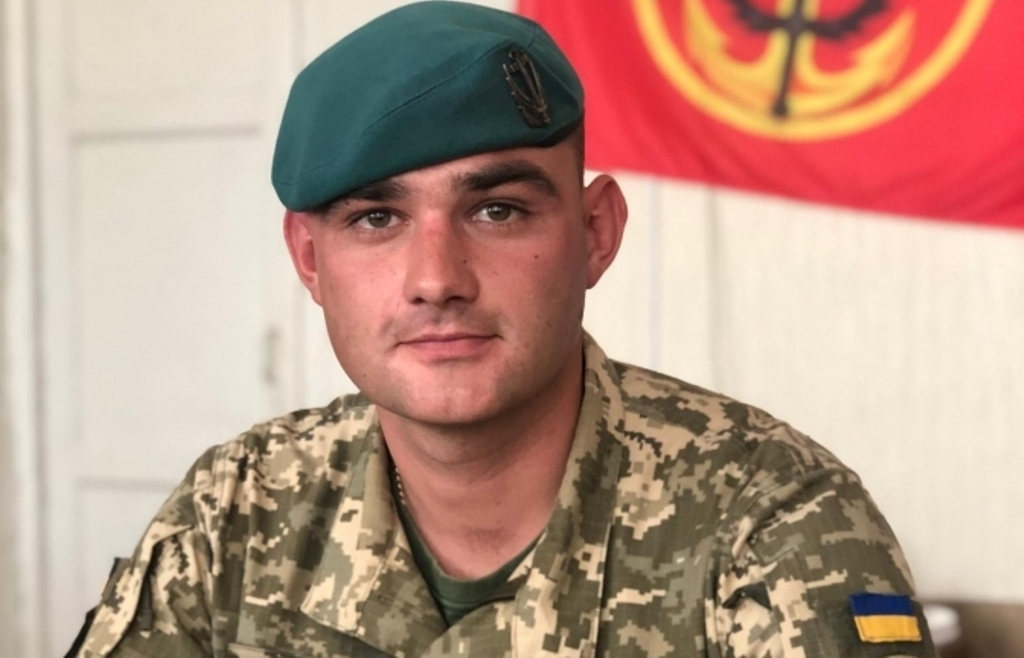
- Native name: Павло Олегович Сбитов
- Born: Pavlo Olehovych Sbytov; 22 October 1994; Berezets, Lviv Oblast, Ukraine
- Died: 12 March 2022 (aged 27) Volnovakha, Donetsk Oblast, Ukraine
- Buried: Berezets, Ukraine
- Allegiance: Ukraine
- Branch: Ukrainian Navy
- Rank: Major
- Conflicts: Russian Invasion of Ukraine: Battle of Volnovakha †

Pavlo Olehovych Sbytov (Ukrainian: Павло Олегович Сбитов; 22 October 1994 – 12 March 2022), was a Ukrainian army officer who served in the Russo-Ukrainian war. He was posthumously awarded the title Hero of Ukraine in March 2022 after he was killed in action in the Battle of Volnovakha.

== Biography ==
Pavlo Sbytov was born on 22 October 1994 in Berezets, now the Komarno community in the Lviv district of Lviv Oblast.

He finished studying at Berezets Middle School in 2009. He graduated from the Lviv State Lyceum with Enhanced Military Physical Training named after the Heroes of Kruty in 2012, and finished the Faculty of Combat Use of Troops of Petro Sahaidachny National Academy of Ground Forces.

After completing the training, he was sent to the 503rd separate battalion of marines, with which he went to the front.

In 2017, Pavlo was appointed company commander.

In 2019, together with his battalion, he took part in the multinational military exercises "Agile Spirit 2019" ("Agile Spirit 2019") in Georgia), where he was awarded as one of the best military personnel. The unit commanded by Sbytov won the competition for the best unit of the same type of the Armed Forces of Ukraine in 2019.

In 2021, he became the commander of the 503rd separate battalion of marines. By that same year, he was promoted to captain.

During the full-scale Russian invasion of Ukraine, he successfully performed combat missions and prevented the encirclement and defeat of units of the 53rd Separate Mechanized Brigade.

On 12 March 2022, Sbytov was mortally wounded during a battle near the village of Yevhenivka with the prevailing enemy forces. The officer stayed with his unit to the last and commanded his troops repulsing the attack.

On 17 March 2022 he was buried in his home village.
