= Staromlynivka rural hromada =

Staromlynivka rural hromada Старомлинівська сільська громада
- Hromada
- Interactive map of Staromlynivka rural hromada
- Country: Ukraine
- Oblast: Donetsk Oblast
- Raion: Volnovakha Raion

Population
  - Total: 14,579

Staromlynivka rural hromada (Ukrainian: Старомлинівська сільська громада) is a hromada of Ukraine, located in Volnovakha Raion, Donetsk Oblast. Its administrative center is the village Staromlynivka.

The hromada contains 14 settlements, including 11 villages:

- Staromlynivka
- Volodyne
- Heorhiivka
- Yevhenivka
- Zavitne Bazhannia
- Krasna Poliana
- Malyi Kermenchyk
- Novomaiorske
- Novopetrykivka
- Orlynske
- Yalynske

And 3 rural settlements: Kermenchyk, Kliuchove, and Novodonetske.

== See also ==
- List of hromadas of Ukraine
