= Staromlynivka =

Village in Donetsk Oblast, Ukraine

Staromlynivka Старомлинівка
- Village
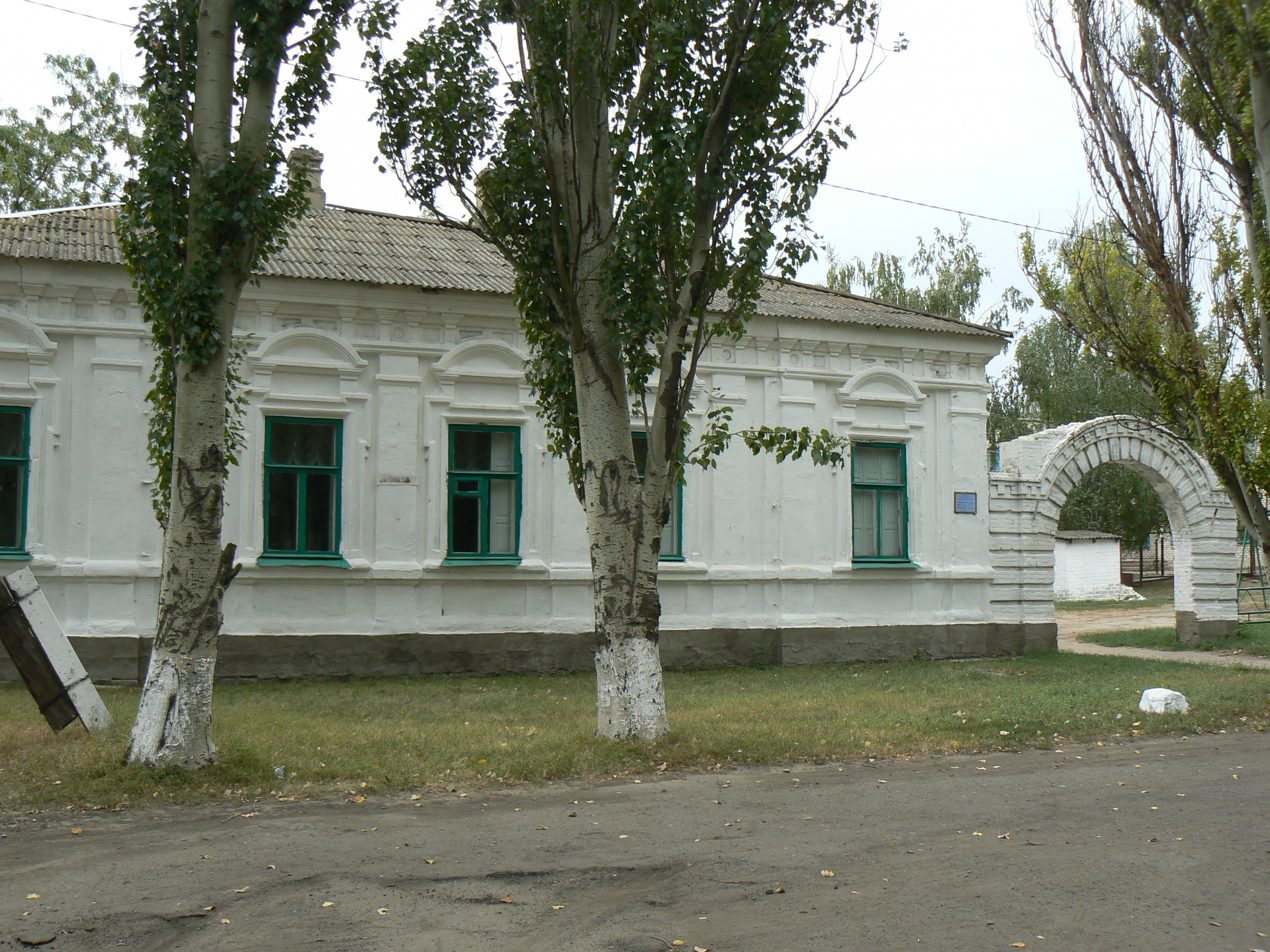
- An old Greek house
- Interactive map of Staromlynivka
- Location of Staromlynivka in Donetsk Oblast Staromlynivka (Ukraine)
- Coordinates: 47°41′51″N 36°49′32″E
- Country: Ukraine
- Oblast: Donetsk Oblast
- Raion: Volnovakha Raion
- Hromada: Staromlynivka rural hromada
- Founded: 1779

Area
  - Total: 7.302 km^{2} (2.819 sq mi)
- Elevation: 106 m (348 ft)

Population (01.01.2014)
  - Total: 2,635
  - Density: 360.9/km^{2} (934.6/sq mi)
- Time zone: UTC+2 (EET)
  - Summer (DST): UTC+3 (EEST)
- Postal code: 85552
- Area code: +380 6243

Staromlynivka (Ukrainian: Старомлинівка; Russian: Старомлыновка, romanized: Staromlynovka) is a village in Volnovakha Raion (district) in Donetsk Oblast of eastern Ukraine, located 14 kilometres (8.7 mi) south of the town of Velyka Novosilka. Before 1946, it was known as Staryi Kermenchyk (Ukrainian: Старий Керменчик; Russian: Старый Керменчик, romanized: Stary Kermenchik) (Old Kermenchyk). It is located in the floodplain of the Mokri Yaly river.

It is the administrative center of Staromlynivka rural hromada, one of the hromadas (communities) of Ukraine.

== History ==
The village was founded as Staryi Kermenchyk in 1779 by Greeks from Crimea. The "Kermenchyk" part of the name comes from the word Т'ерменчик (Ťermenčik) from the Urum language, a Turkic language spoken by some Pontic Greeks. The word means "small mill", and the modern name "Staromlynivka" is a calque of this Urum-derived name into Ukrainian.

In 1886, Staryi Kermenchyk was recorded as being the center of Staro-Kermenchitska volost inside Mariupol uyezd. The volost contained one other village, Nova Karakuba. In the 20th century, Staryi Kermenchyk was a scene of fighting during the Russian Civil War. It was the center of Staromlynivka Raion (known as Staryi Kermenchik Raion until 1946) from 1923 until 1959.

By 1926, Staryi Kermenchyk still had one of the largest Greek communities in Ukraine, as part of the larger community in the area between Mariupol and Donetsk. It was renamed to Staromlynivka in 1946. In May 1964, a local history museum was opened in Staromlynivka.

=== 2022 Russian invasion of Ukraine ===
The village was captured by Russian forces on March 13, 2022, during the Russian invasion of Ukraine. During the 2023 Ukrainian counteroffensive, Russian-installed occupation official Vladimir Rogov reported that Ukraine was aiming to take back control of the village.

== Demographics ==
The settlement had 3,373 inhabitants in 2001. The native language distribution as of the Ukrainian Census of the same year was:

- Ukrainian: 16.04%
- Russian: 82.12%
- Greek (including Mariupol Greek and Urum): 0.8%
- Armenian: 0.24%
- Belarusian: 0.15%
- Moldovan (Romanian): 0.03%

== Gallery ==
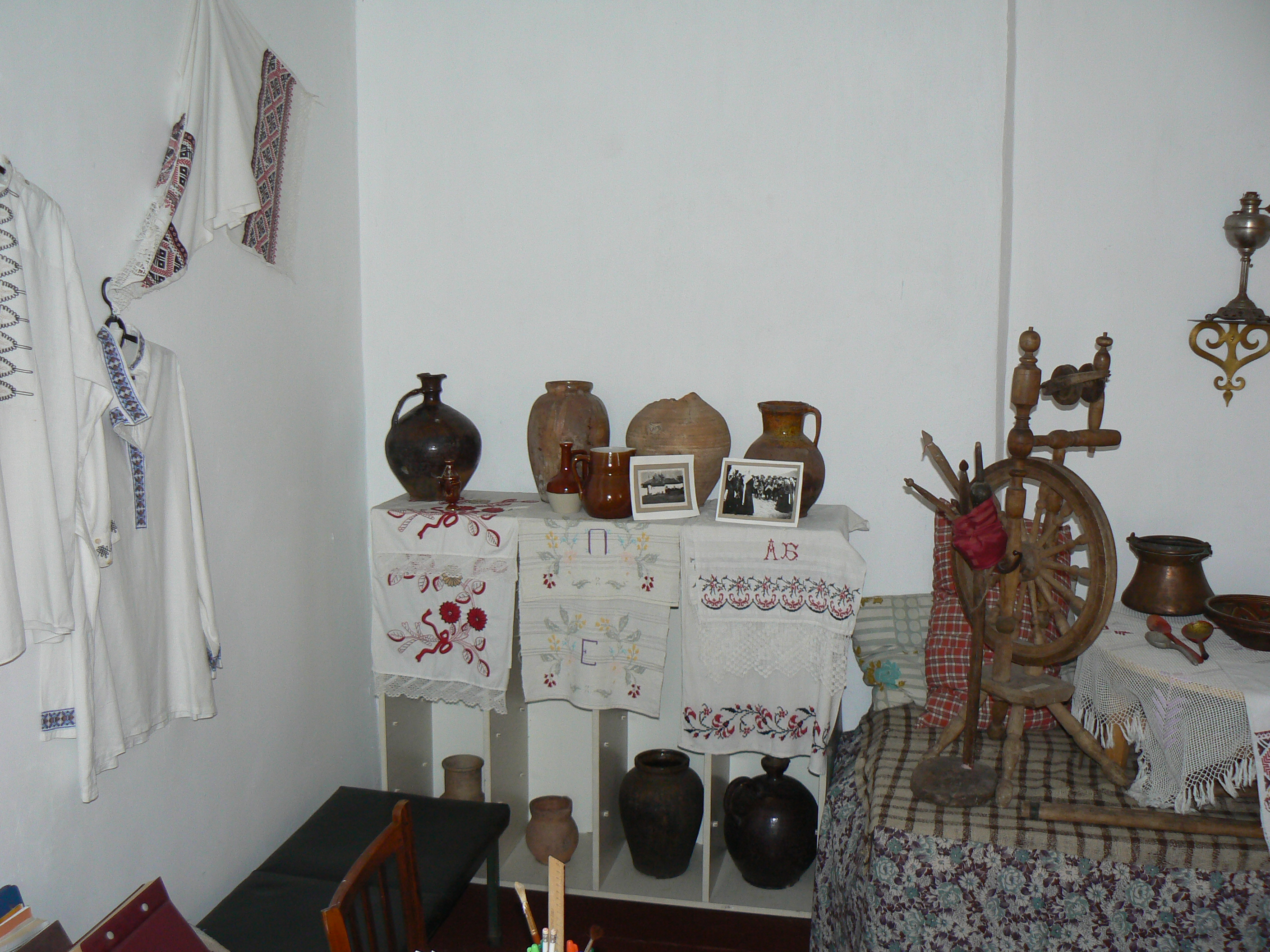
An exhibition in the local history museum

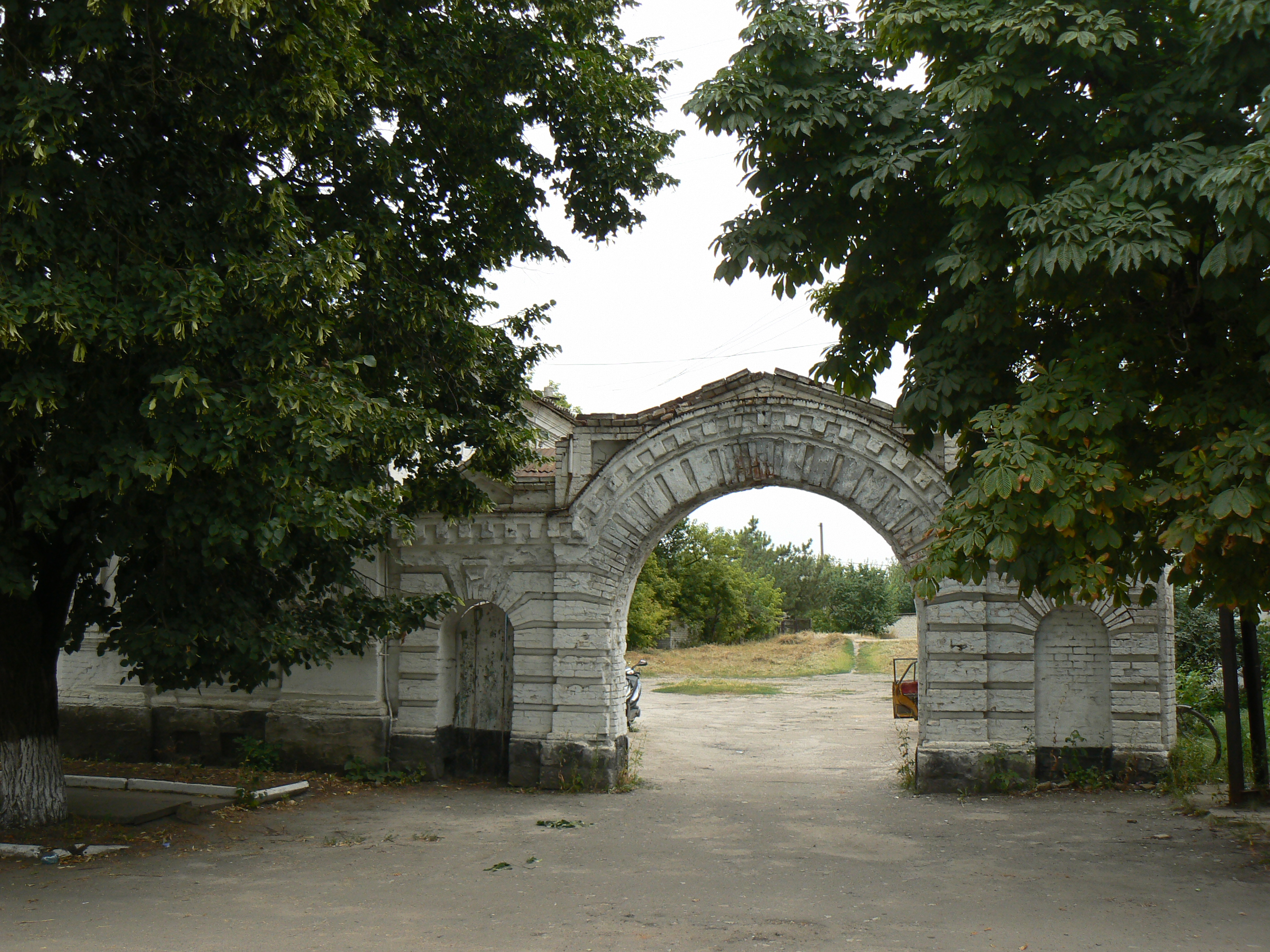
Gateway of the local history museum

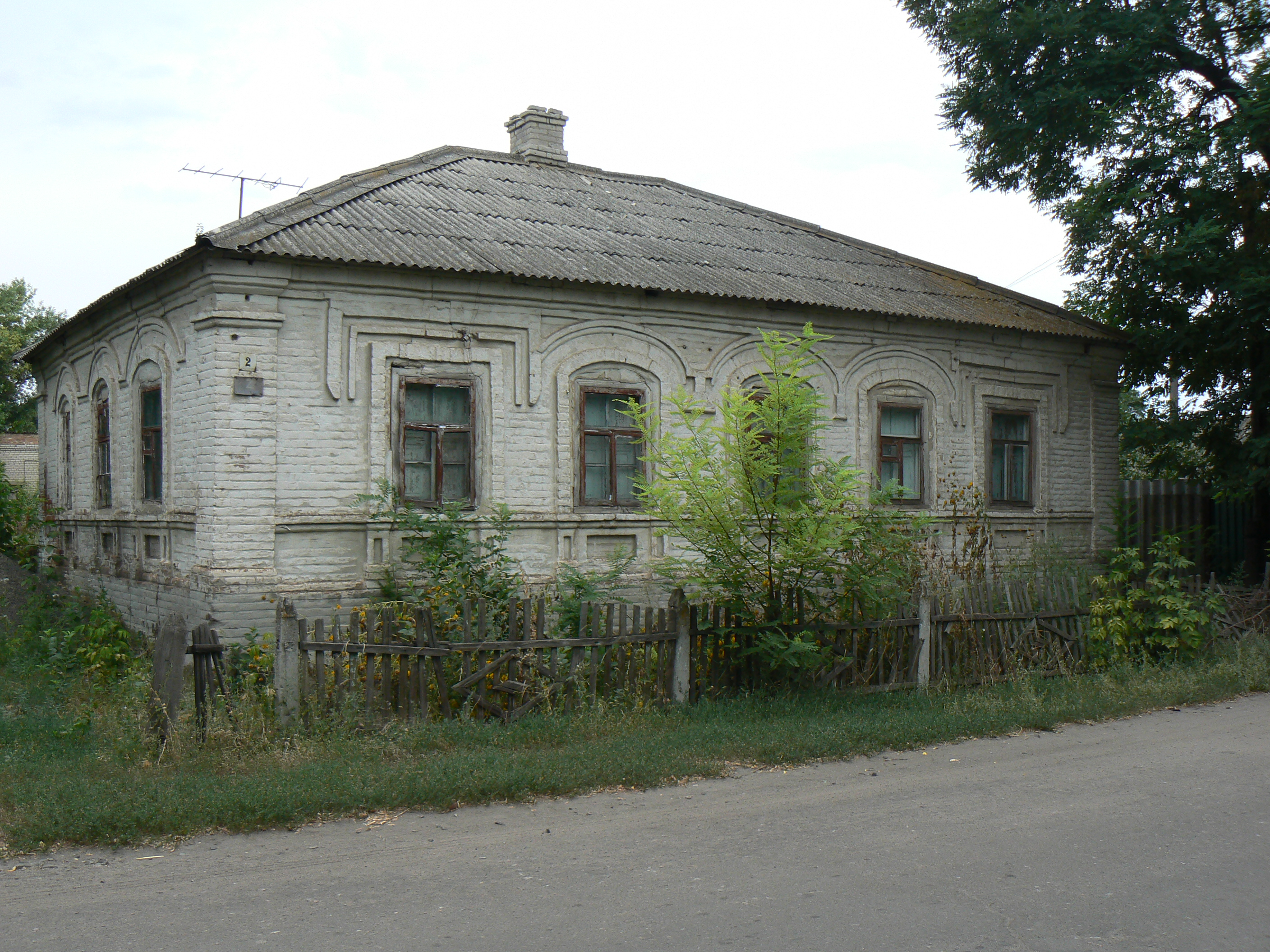
An old Greek house

== See also ==
- Kermenchyk, a nearby settlement founded by colonists from Staryi ("Old") Kermenchyk
