= 38th Marine Brigade =

Ukrainian military unit

- 38 окрема бригада морської піхоти
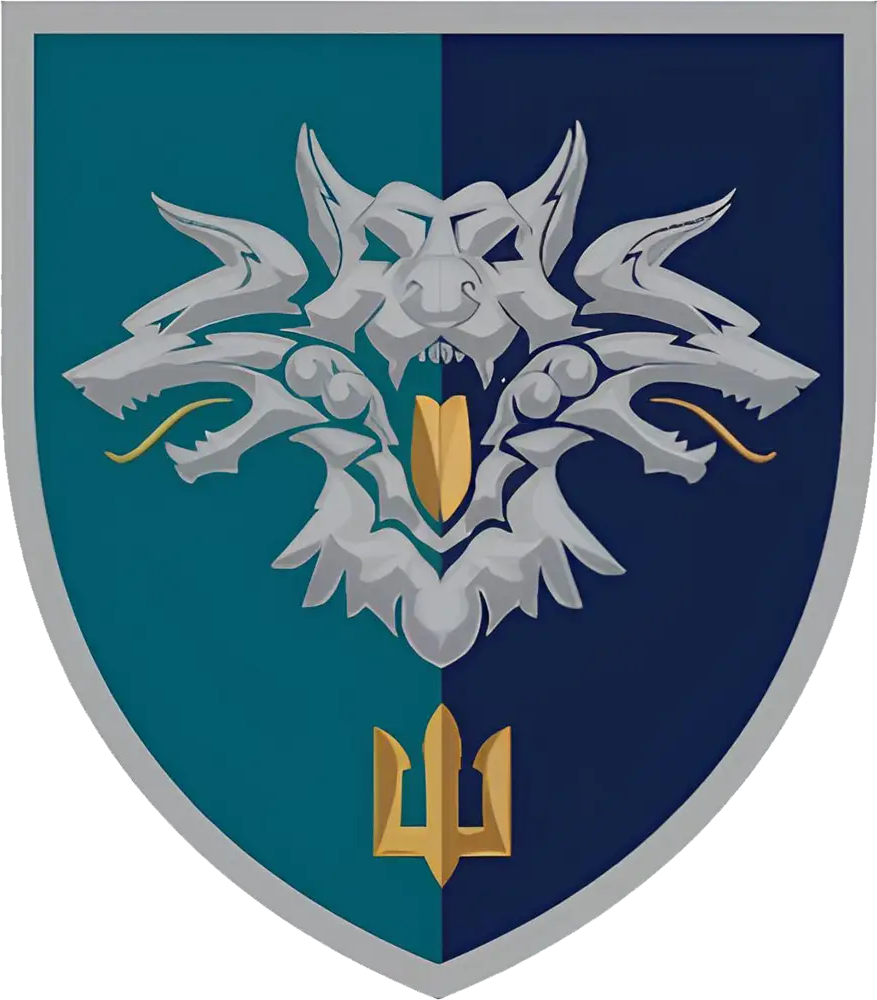
- Active: February 2023 - present
- Country: Ukraine
- Branch: Ukrainian Marine Corps
- Type: Brigade
- Role: Marines
- Size: 2,000
- Part of: 30th Marine Corps
- Nickname: Petro Sahaidachny
- Patron: Petro Sahaidachny
- Engagements: Russian invasion of Ukraine; 2023 Ukrainian counteroffensive; Pokrovsk offensive
- Decorations: For Courage and Bravery
- Website: Official Facebook page

Commanders
- Current commander: Lt. Col. Yevheniy Bova

Insignia
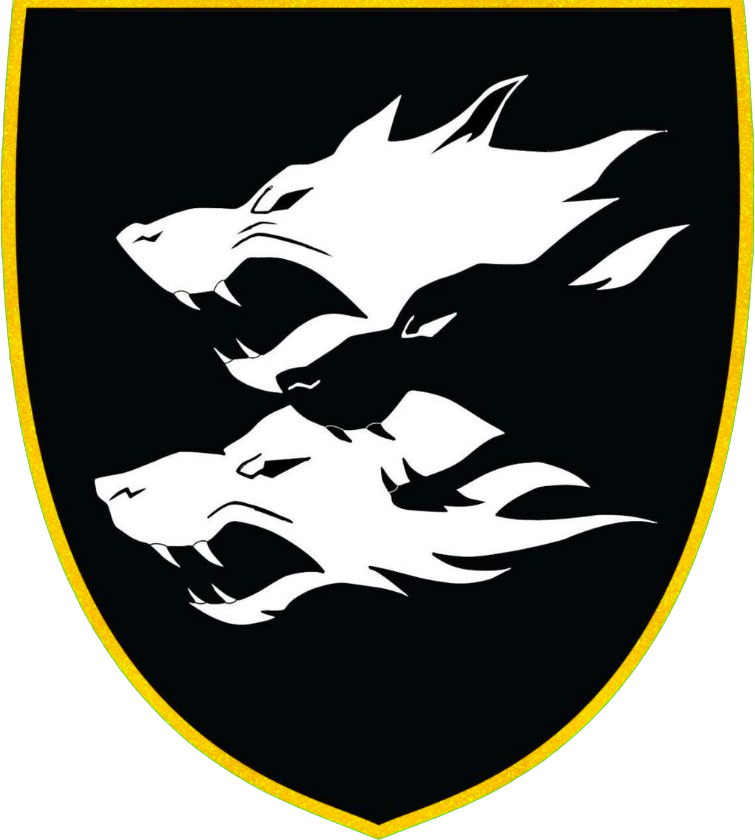
- Old unit patch (February–July 2023)

- Flag

The 38th Separate Marine Brigade "Hetman Petro Sahaidachny" (Ukrainian: 38-ма окрема бригада морської піхоти імені гетьмана Петра Сагайдачного; 38 ОБрМП, MUN A4765), is a naval infantry brigade of the Ukrainian Marine Corps of the Armed Forces of Ukraine.

== History ==
The 38th Brigade was formed out of a basis of the 503rd Separate Marine Battalion in February 2023. The unit was formed as part of an expansion to the Ukrainian Naval Infantry alongside the 37th Marine Brigade. During the 2023 Ukrainian counteroffensive the unit has been equipped with French manufactured AMX-10 RC armoured reconnaissance vehicles.

At least since July 2023, the brigade has participated in battles in the Vuhledar direction. Working together with 35th Marine Brigade they liberated the village of Urozhaine on August 16, 2023. On 23 May 2025, the brigade was awarded the honorary title "named after Hetman Petro Sahaidachny" by decree of President Volodymyr Zelenskyy.

On 6 December 2024 the unit was awarded the honorary award For Courage and Bravery by the President of Ukraine Volodymyr Zelenskyy.

== Structure ==
- 38th Marine Brigade (38 ОБрМП A4765). Commander Lt. Col. Yevheniy Bova
  - Headquarters & Services Company
  - 1st Marine Battalion
  - 2nd Marine Battalion
  - 503rd Separate Marine Battalion. (503 ОБМП A1275). Commander Denis Karnaushenko
    - Formed on July 20, 2015 and based out of Mariupol, the formation of the 38th Marine Brigade was built around the 503rd Battalion. On 12 March 2022, the unit's commander, Pavlo Sbytov, was killed in the Siege of Mariupol.
  - Tank Battalion
  - Artillery Division (2S1 Gvozdika, M109L)
    - Control and Artillery Reconnaissance Battery
    - 1st Self-propelled Artillery Division (2S1 Gvozdika)
    - Multiple Rocket Launcher Division
    - Anti-tank Division (ПТРК 38 ОБрМП)
  - Anti-Aircraft Missile and Artillery Division
  - Reconnaissance Company "Argus"
  - Unmanned Attack Aircraft Company "Flying Cerberus" (РУБАК Літаючі "Цербери")
  - Sniper Company
  - Combat Engineer Battalion
  - Logistic Battalion
  - Maintenance Battalion
  - Signal Company
  - Radar Company
  - Medical Company
  - Chemical, Biological, Radiological and Nuclear Defense Company
  - Military band
