= Taurida electoral district =

Former constituency in the Taurida Governate

Taurida
- Former Civilian constituency for the All-Russian Constituent Assembly
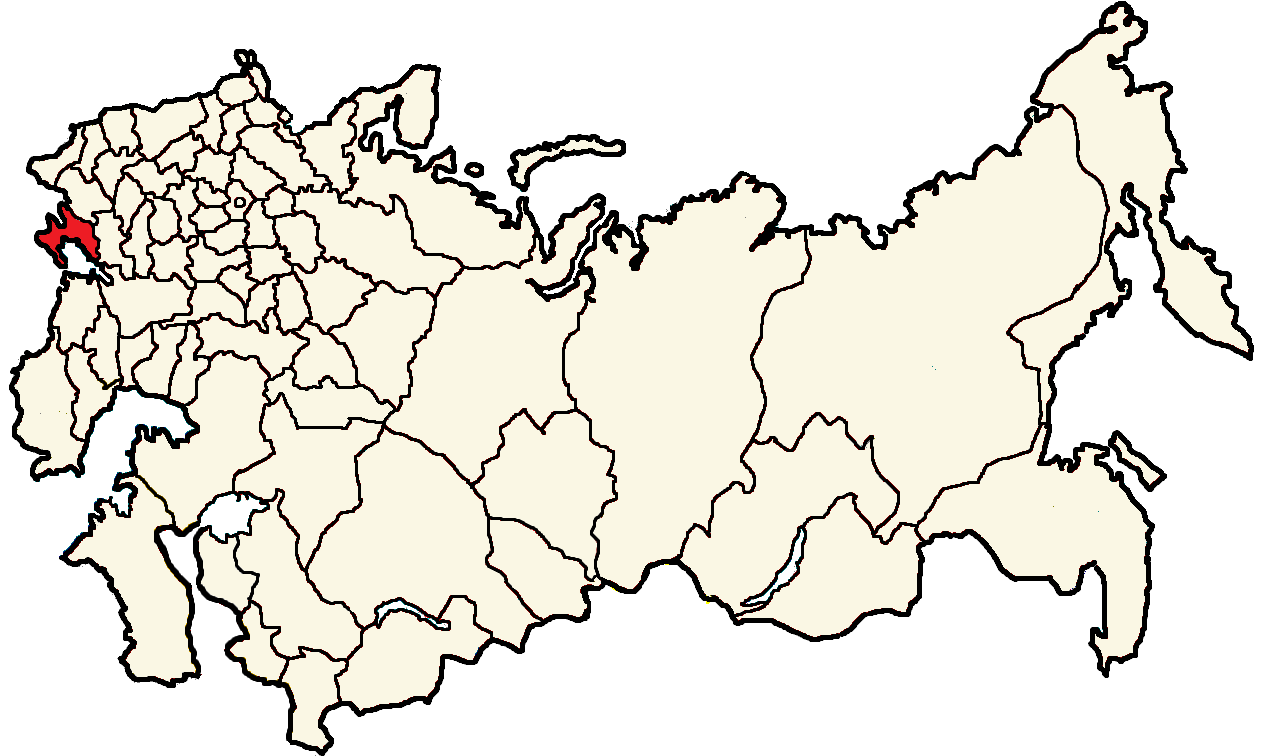

Former constituency
- Created: 1917
- Abolished: 1918
- Number of members: 9
- Number of Uyezd Electoral Commissions: 8
- Number of Urban Electoral Commissions: 3
- Number of Parishes: 102

The Taurida electoral district (Russian: Таврический избирательный округ) was a constituency created for the 1917 Russian Constituent Assembly election.

The electoral district covered the Taurida Governorate. One peasant list had been denied registration.

Taurida had a 54.74% voter turnout. The account of U.S. historian Oliver Henry Radkey, the source for the results table below, is missing the votes from Berdiansk uezd with some 3,400 electors and Vodiansk volost of Melitopol uezd. All in all there were 753 precincts in the Taurida electoral district.

== Results ==
Taurida
Party	Vote	%
List 5 - Socialist-Revolutionaries	300,100	52.22
List 9 - Muslims	68,581	11.93
List 3 - Ukrainian Socialist-Revolutionaries	61,541	10.71
List 1 - Kadets	38,794	6.75
List 3 - Bolsheviks	31,612	5.50
List 10 - Germans	27,681	4.82
List 6 - Mensheviks	15,176	2.64
List 11 - Jewish Nationalists	13,986	2.43
List 12 - Landowner	7,715	1.34
List 2 - Popular Socialists	4,643	0.81
List 7 - Unity	2,273	0.40
List 8 - Poalei Zion	1,745	0.30
Molokan	885	0.15
Total:	574,732	

Deputies Elected
Bogdanov	Kadet
Saltan	Ukrainian SR
Alyasov	SR
Bakuta	SR
Bondar	SR
Nikonov	SR
Popov	SR
Tolstov	SR
Zak	SR
Seidamet	Provisional Crimean; Muslim Executive Committee

In Kerch there were 21,174 eligible voters, out of whom 8,592 voted. 2,580 votes were cast for the SRs and 2,381 votes were cast for the Kadets.
