= Vilne Pole =

Vilne Pole Вільне Поле
- Village
- Interactive map of Vilne Pole
- Location of Vilne Pole within Ukraine Vilne Pole (Donetsk Oblast)
- Coordinates: 47°52′30″N 36°41′17″E
- Country: Ukraine
- Oblast: Donetsk Oblast
- Raion: Volnovakha Raion
- Hromada: Komar rural hromada
- Elevation: 143 m (469 ft)

Population (2001 census)
  - Total: 385
- Time zone: UTC+2 (EET)
  - Summer (DST): UTC+3 (EEST)
- Postal code: 85522
- Area code: +380 6243
- KATOTTH: UA14040070030010923

Vilne Pole (Ukrainian: Вільне Поле; Russian: Вольное Поле) is a village in Komar rural hromada, Volnovakha Raion, Donetsk Oblast, eastern Ukraine. It is located 84.11 kilometres (52.26 mi) west by south (WbS) from the centre of Donetsk city.

== Geography ==
The absolute height is 143 metres above sea level.

== Demographics ==
As of the 2001 Ukrainian census, the settlement had 385 inhabitants, whose native languages were 90.55% Ukrainian, 8.21% Russian and 1.24% Belarusian.

== History ==
=== Russian invasion of Ukraine ===
The village was captured by Russian forces in May 2025, during the full-scale Russian invasion of Ukraine.
