= Urozhaine, Donetsk Oblast =

Urozhaine Урожайне
- Rural settlement
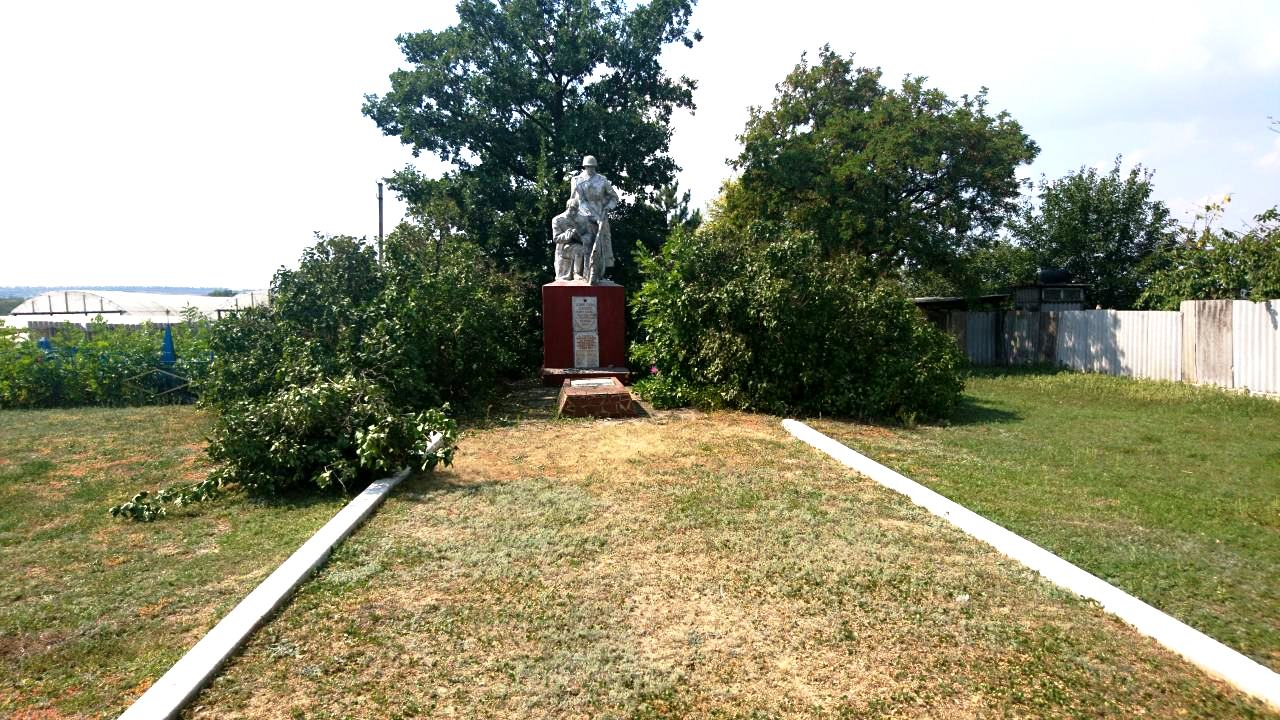
- Memorial in Urozhaine to commemorate Soviet soldiers fighting in World War II
- Interactive map of Urozhaine
- Location of Urozhaine within Ukraine Urozhaine (Donetsk Oblast)
- Coordinates: 47°44′55″N 36°49′09″E
- Country: Ukraine
- Oblast: Donetsk Oblast
- Raion: Volnovakha Raion
- Hromada: Velyka Novosilka settlement hromada

Population (2001)
  - Total: 1,000
- Time zone: UTC+2
  - Summer (DST): UTC+3 (EEST)
- Postal code: 85550
- Area code: +380 6243

Urozhaine (Ukrainian: Урожайне, pronounced [ʊroˈʒɑjne]; Russian: Урожайное, romanized: Urozhaynoye; both lit. 'of the harvest') is a rural settlement in Volnovakha Raion, Donetsk Oblast, Ukraine. It is situated on the opposite side of the Mokri Yaly river from the village of Staromaiorske. It belongs to the Velyka Novosilka settlement hromada.

== History ==
On 17 July 2020, according to the resolution of the Verkhovna Rada "On the Formation and Liquidation of Districts", the village was included in the Velyka Novosilka settlement hromada, Volnovakha Raion. Until 2020, it was part of the Velyka Novosilka Raion.

=== Russo-Ukrainian War ===
==== Russian invasion of Ukraine ====
Urozhaine was occupied by Russian forces during the Russian invasion of Ukraine in 2022. During the 2023 Ukrainian counteroffensive, it was one of several settlements that saw heavily concentrated fighting as it was seen as a point of great strategic value. Ukrainian forces entered the settlement on 10 August 2023 and the 35th Marine Brigade together with 38th Separate Marine Brigade, together with other Ukrainian defence forces, fully liberated it on 16 August, according to Ukraine; footage geolocated by CNN showed soldiers raising the Ukrainian flag near a memorial for Soviet troops fighting in the Second World War.

On 28 December 2023, Russian state-controlled sources claimed that the Bogdan Khmelnitsky Battalion had engaged Ukrainian forces near Urozhaine.

On 8 May 2024, it was reported that Russian forces had re-entered Urozhaine and had advanced up to central parts of the village. DeepStateMap.Live reported Russian forces to have recaptured it around 13 July. On 18 July, Ukrainian authorities confirmed that their forces had withdrawn from the village, claiming that while Russian losses were more than one hundred to several hundred killed "every day", their defensive positions had been destroyed, along with the village itself.

== Demographics ==
According to the 2001 census, Urozhaine has a population of 1,000. 57.4% of residents were native Ukrainian speakers, 42.1% were native Russian speakers, 0.2% were native Armenian speakers, 0.1% were native Belarusian speakers, 0.1% were native Bulgarian speakers, and 0.1% were native Greek (including Mariupol Greek and Urum) speakers.
