= Yevhenivka =

Yevhenivka Євгенівка
- Village
- Location within Donetsk Oblast Location within Ukraine
- Coordinates: 47°40′16″N 37°5′11″E
- Country: Ukraine
- Oblast: Donetsk Oblast
- Raion: Volnovakha Raion
- Hromada: Staromlynivka rural hromada
- Elevation: 175 m (574 ft)

Population
  - Total: 496
- Postal code: 85563
- Area code: +380-6243

Yevhenivka (Ukrainian: Євгенівка) is a village in Staromlynivka rural hromada, Volnovakha Raion, Donetsk Oblast, Ukraine. It is located east of Velyka Novosilka.

== History ==
On 13 March 2022, during the Russian invasion of Ukraine, the Ukrainian military reported that Russian forces captured the village.
