= Komar rural hromada =

Komar rural hromada Комарська селищна громада
- Hromada
- Interactive map of Komar rural hromada
- Country: Ukraine
- Oblast: Donetsk
- Raion: Volnovakha

Area
  - Total: 423.2 km^{2} (163.4 sq mi)

Population (2020)
  - Total: 6,948
  - Density: 16.42/km^{2} (42.52/sq mi)
- Settlements: 24
- Rural settlements: 5
- Villages: 19

Komar rural hromada (Ukrainian: Комарська селищна громада) is a hromada of Ukraine, located in Volnovakha Raion, Donetsk Oblast. Its administrative center is the village of Komar.

It has an area of 423.2 square kilometres (163.4 mi^{2}) and a population of 6,948, as of 2020.

The hromada contains twenty-four settlements, including nineteen villages:

- Andriivka-Klevtsove
- Dniproenerhiia
- Fedorivka
- Hrushivske
- Komar
- Myrne
- Novokhatske
- Novoocheretuvate
- Oleksandrohrad
- Piddubne
- Pryvilne
- Skudne
- Tovste
- Vesele
- Vilne Pole
- Voskresenka
- Yalta
- Zaporizhzhia
- Zirka

And five rural settlements: Burlatske, Komyshuvakha, Perebudova, Shevchenko, and Zelenyi Hai.

== Demographics ==
As of the 2001 Ukrainian census, the subdivision had a population of 9,386 people. The linguistic distribution of the population was as follows:

Native languages (2001)
	percent
Ukrainian	66.8%
Russian	30.7%
Greek	1.7%
Armenian	0.1%
Belarusian	0.1%
others	0.6%

== See also ==
- List of hromadas of Ukraine
