= Piddubne, Donetsk Oblast =

Rural locality in Donetsk Oblast, Ukraine

Piddubne Піддубне
- Village
- Interactive map of Piddubne
- Location of Piddubne within Ukraine Piddubne (Ukraine)
- Coordinates: 48°00′42″N 36°41′22″E
- Country: Ukraine
- Oblast: Donetsk Oblast
- Raion: Volnovakha Raion
- Hromada: Komar rural hromada
- Founded: 1920

Area
  - Total: 1.788 km^{2} (0.690 sq mi)
- Elevation: 94 m (308 ft)

Population (2001 census)
  - Total: 686
  - Density: 384/km^{2} (994/sq mi)
- Time zone: UTC+2 (EET)
  - Summer (DST): UTC+3 (EEST)
- Postal code: 85512
- Area code: +380 6243
- KATOTTH: UA14040070140083127

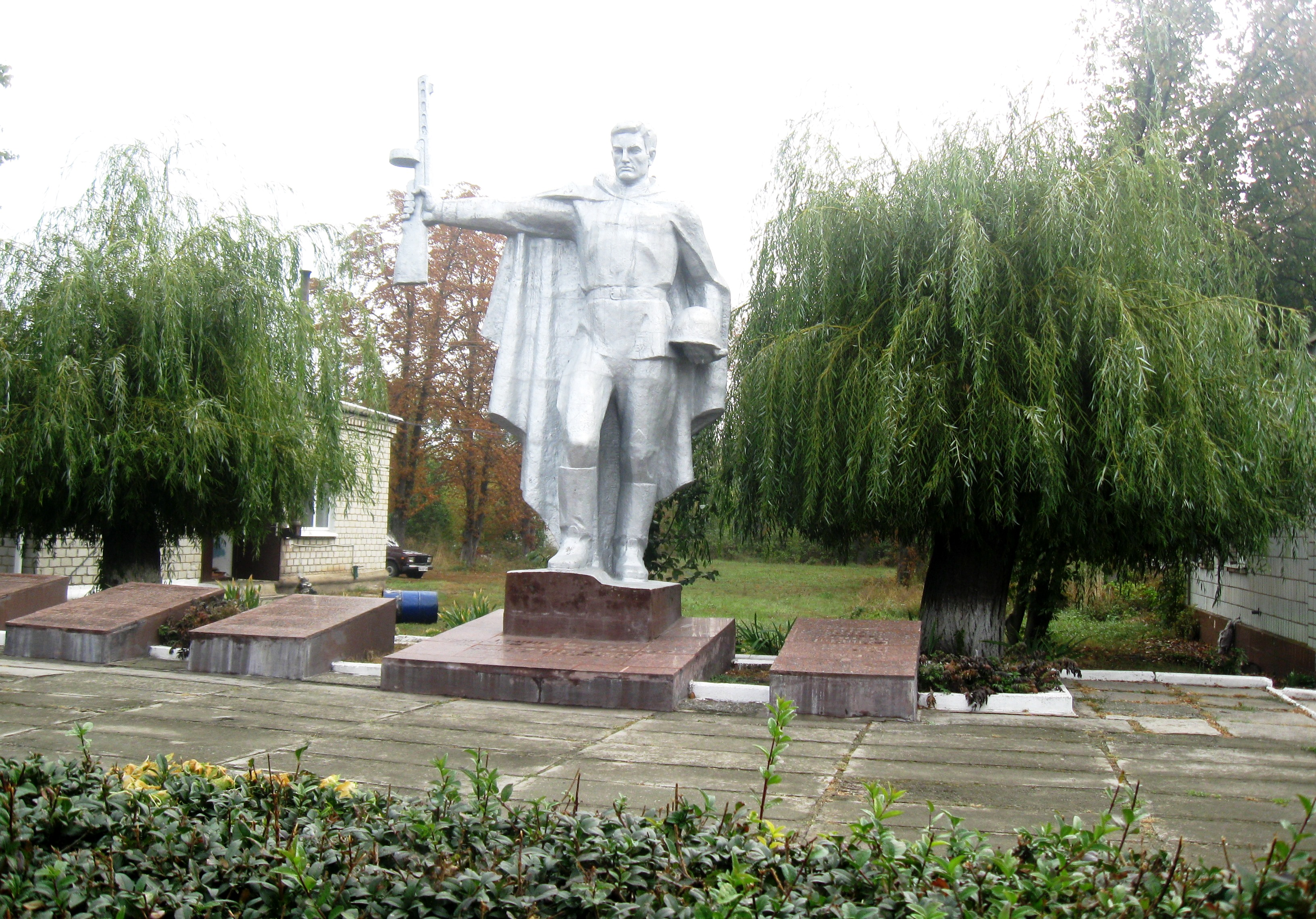
Grave of V. I. Shashka, military pilot, and monument to fellow countrymen soldiers, Piddubne, Kyivskyi Ave.

Piddubne (Ukrainian: Піддубне; Russian: Поддубное) is a village in Komar rural hromada, Volnovakha Raion, Donetsk Oblast, eastern Ukraine. It is located 82.42 km (51.21 mi) west from the centre of Donetsk city.

== History ==
The settlement was founded in 1920.

=== Russian invasion of Ukraine ===
The village was captured by Russian forces in July 2025, during the full-scale Russian invasion of Ukraine.

== Demographics ==
As of the 2001 Ukrainian census, the settlement had 686 inhabitants, whose native languages were 81.34% Ukrainian, 14.58% Russian, 0.29% Belarusian, 0.15% Bulgarian, 0.15% Moldovan (Romanian) and 0.29% Greek (including Mariupol Greek and Urum).
