= Komar, Ukraine =

Komar Комар
- Village
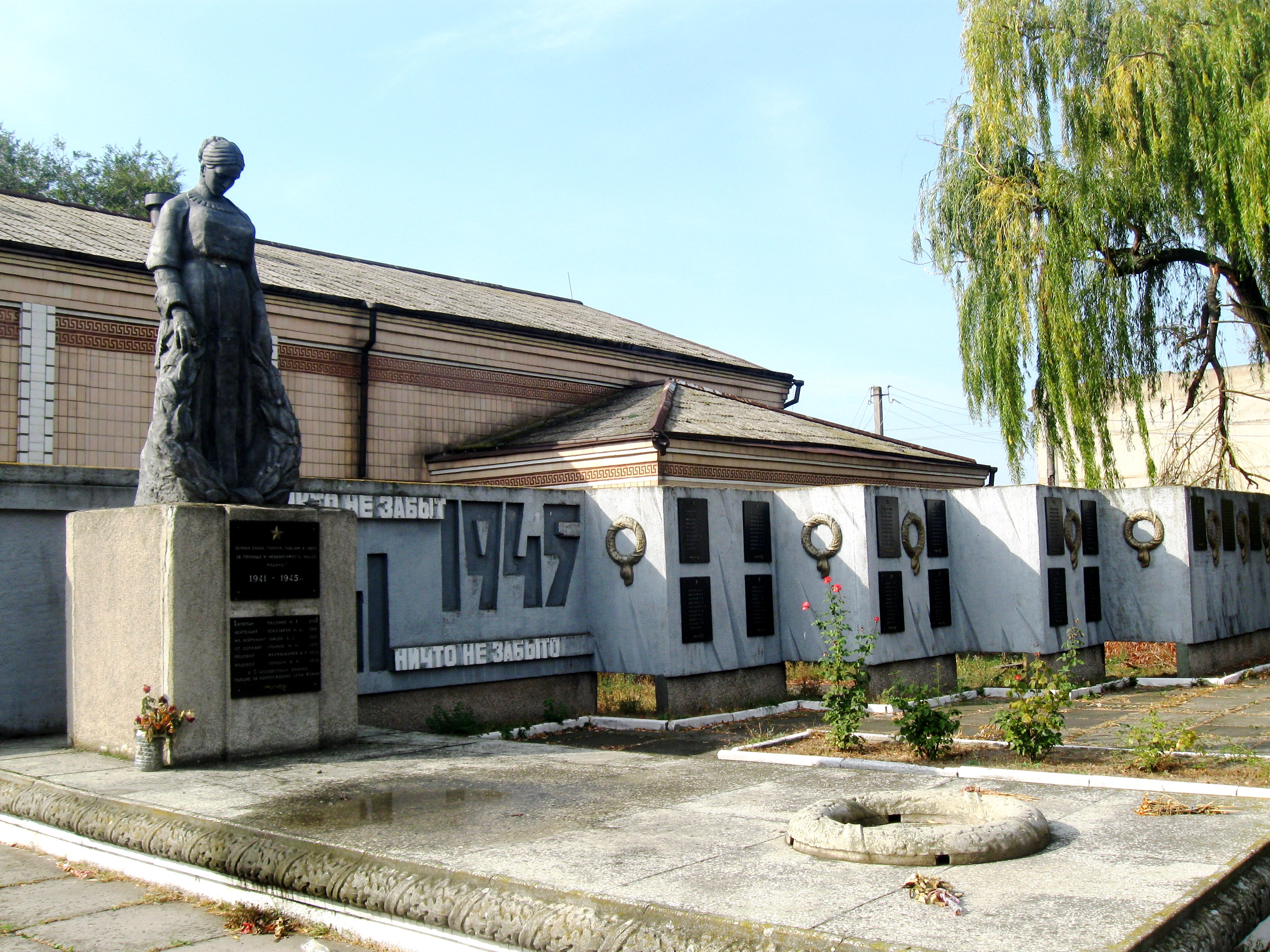
- Mass grave of Soviet soldiers

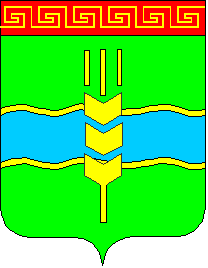
- Seal

- Location within Donetsk Oblast Location within Ukraine
- Coordinates: 47°58′39″N 36°45′33″E
- Country: Ukraine
- Oblast: Donetsk Oblast
- Raion: Volnovakha Raion
- Hromada: Komar rural hromada
- Established: 1780

Government
  - Body: Komar Village Council
  - Mayor: Roman Mykhailovych Dmitriev

Area
  - Total: 3,223 km^{2} (1,244 sq mi)
- Elevation: 114 m (374 ft)

Population (2014)
  - Total: 1,326
  - Density: 0.4114/km^{2} (1.066/sq mi)
- Postal code: 85520
- Area code: +380 6243
- Website: komar.rada.org.ua

Komar (Ukrainian: Комар; Russian: Комар) is a village in Volnovakha Raion, Donetsk Oblast, Ukraine.

== Geography ==
The village is located on the right bank of the Mokri Yaly River and is 21 km from Velyka Novosilka by road. It also passes by a local highway.

== History ==
Komar was founded in 1780 by Greek immigrants from the Crimean village of Kamara (modern-day Oboronne).

During the Soviet period, the village was the center of a collective farm known as "Zapovit Illicha", a large and diversified farm where livestock was raised for meat and milk.

=== Russo-Ukrainian war ===
On January 25, 2025, Ukrainian authorities began the mandatory evacuation of families with children from the Komar Rural Hromada due to intensified Russian shelling. Only four residents remained in the village by March 10.

By June, fighting was happening near the village, with it being shelled on June 6. Soon after, the Russian Ministry of Defence claimed that its forces had completely captured the village on June 13.

On October 25, 2026, Ukrainian military observer Kostiantyn Mashovets reported that Ukrainian forces recaptured the village.

== Demographics ==
According to the 2001 Ukrainian Census, the population of the village was 1,705 people, of which 8.09% stated that their mother tongue was Ukrainian, 84.16% – Russian, 7.33% – Greek (including Mariupol Greek and Urum), 0.12% – Armenian, and 0.06% – Belarusian.

== Famous people ==
- Serhiy Vasyliovych Holovko is the director of the agricultural society, an honored worker of agriculture of Ukraine.

The following were born in the settlement:

- Hryhoriy Panteliyovych Alchiev (* 1946) a Ukrainian artist.
- Spiridon Mykhailovych Egorov (1908-1999) a Hero of the Soviet Union.
