= Zachativka (village) =

Village in Ukraine

Coordinates: 47°28′22″N 37°11′56″E

Zachativka is a village in Volnovakha Raion, Donetsk Oblast (province) of eastern Ukraine. It is connected by road to the city of Mariupol on the coast in the south.
