= Volodino, Solikamsky District, Perm Krai =

Volodino Володино
- Village
- Location within Perm Krai Location within Russia
- Coordinates: 59°32′N 56°53′E
- Country: Russia
- Region: Perm Krai
- District: Solikamsky District
- Time zone: UTC+5:00

Volodino (Russian: Володино) is a rural locality (a village) in Solikamsky District, Perm Krai, Russia. The population was 13 as of 2010. There are 10 streets.

== Geography ==
Volodino is located 20 km southeast of Solikamsk (the district's administrative centre) by road. Usovsky is the nearest rural locality.
