= Novopetrykivka =

Village in Donetsk oblast, Ukraine

Coordinates: 47°37′40″N 36°56′14″E

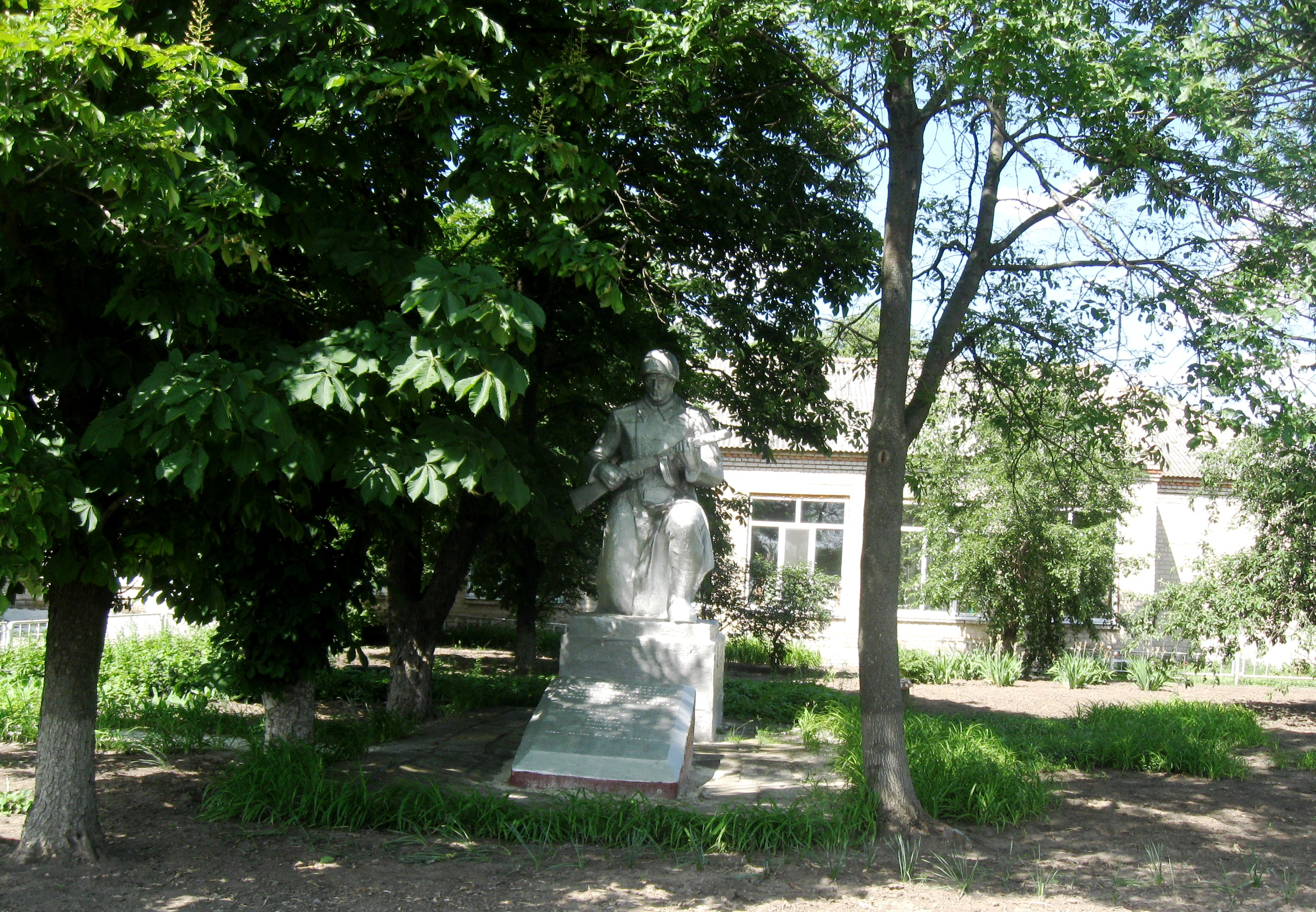
Monument in Novopetrykivka, Ukraine

Novopetrykivka (Ukrainian: Новопетриківка) is a village in southeastern Ukraine, located administratively in Staromlynivka rural hromada, Volnovakha Raion, Donetsk Oblast.

== Demographics ==
It has a population of 2,087 people.
