= Dachne, Novopavlivka hromada =

Village in Dnipropetrovsk Oblast, Ukraine

Dachne Дачне
- Village
- Interactive map of Dachne
- Location of Dachne Dachne (Ukraine)
- Coordinates: 48°2′35″N 36°49′31″E
- Country: Ukraine
- Oblast: Dnipropetrovsk Oblast
- Raion: Synelnykove Raion
- Hromada: Novopavlivka rural hromada
- Elevation: 94 m (308 ft)

Population (2001)
  - Total: 121
- Time zone: UTC+2
  - Summer (DST): UTC+3
- Postal code: 52950
- Area code: +380 5630

Dachne is a village in Synelnykove Raion, Dnipropetrovsk Oblast, Ukraine. It is part of Novopavlivka rural hromada. Until 2016, it was part of the Novopavlivka Village Council.

== Geography ==
The village of Dachne is located on the right bank of the Vovcha River, upstream at a distance of 1 km is the village of Novoukrainka, downstream at a distance of 6 km is the village of Philia. The T 0428 highway passes nearby.

== History ==
During the Holodomor, at least 58 villagers had died.

On June 12, 2020, in accordance with the Resolution of the Cabinet of Ministers of Ukraine No. 723-r "On the Determination of Administrative Centers and Approval of Territories of Territorial Communities of Dnipropetrovsk region", it became part of the Novopavlivska rural community.

On July 19, 2020, as a result of the administrative-territorial reform and liquidation of the Mezhova Raion, the village became part of the newly formed Sumy Raion.

=== Russian Invasion of Ukraine ===
During the Russo-Ukrainian War, Dachne first came in proximity of hostilities between Russian and Ukrainian forces in June 2025. Russian forces first entered the village before July 1. Russian forces captured the village on July 1. On July 6, Ukrainian forces launched counterattack on the settlement, recontesting the village. The Russians recaptured the settlement of June 25. Dachne is significant in being the first village in Dnipropetrovsk Oblast to be contested and captured by Russian forces during the Russo-Ukrainian War.

== Population ==
According to the 2001 Ukrainian census, the village's population was 121 people. The main languages of the village were:

- Ukrainian 87.16%
- Russian 9.17%
- Romanian 3.67%
