= Volodino, Beryozovsky District, Perm Krai =

Volodino Володино
- Selo
- Location within Perm Krai Location within Russia
- Coordinates: 57°41′N 57°09′E
- Country: Russia
- Region: Perm Krai
- District: Beryozovsky District
- Time zone: UTC+5:00

Volodino (Russian: Володино) is a rural locality (a selo) in Dubovskoye Rural Settlement, Beryozovsky District, Perm Krai, Russia. The population was 69 as of 2010.

== Geography ==
Volodino is located 15 km northwest of Beryozovka (the district's administrative centre) by road. Dubovoye is the nearest rural locality.
