= Volodino, Vladimir Oblast =

Volodino Володино
- Village
- Location within Vladimir Oblast Location within Russia
- Coordinates: 56°22′N 38°51′E
- Country: Russia
- Region: Vladimir Oblast
- District: Alexandrovsky District
- Time zone: UTC+3:00

Volodino (Russian: Володино) is a rural locality (a village) in Andreyevskoye Rural Settlement, Alexandrovsky District, Vladimir Oblast, Russia. The population was 8 as of 2010. There are five streets.

== Geography ==
Volodino is located 10 km east of Alexandrov (the district's administrative centre) by road. Ivano-Sobolevo is the nearest rural locality.
