= Nova Karakuba =

Nova Karakuba Нова Каракуба
- Village
- Location within Donetsk Oblast Location within Ukraine
- Country: Ukraine
- Oblast: Donetsk Oblast
- Raion: Volnovakha Raion
- Hromada: Staromlynivka rural hromada
- Established: 1787

Area
  - Total: 8.231 km^{2} (3.178 sq mi)
- Elevation: 138 m (453 ft)

Population (2014)
  - Total: 3,828
  - Density: 465.1/km^{2} (1,205/sq mi)
- Postal code: 85571
- Area code: +380 6243

Nova Karakuba (Ukrainian: Нова Каракуба), until 2024 known as Krasna Poliana (Ukrainian: Красна Поляна; Russian: Красная Поляна, romanized: Krasnaya Polyana; Greek: Κράσναγια Πολιάνα) is a village in southern Ukraine, administratively located in Staromlynivka rural hromada, Volnovakha Raion, Donetsk Oblast.

== History ==
The modern village is the result of a merger of two historic villages: the Greek colony of Nova Karakuba and the German colony of Elizavetdorf. (Note: Ukrainian: Єлизаветдорф; Russian: Елизабетдорф, romanized: Elizabetdorf; German: Elisabethdorf)

Nova Karakuba was renamed to Krasna Poliana on 15 August 1945.

On 19 September 2024, the Verkhovna Rada of Ukraine voted to restore the name Nova Karakuba to the village.

== Demographics ==
According to the 2001 Ukrainian census, the village had a population of 4,606, of whom 12.44% spoke Ukrainian, 80.26% spoke Russian, 7.1% spoke Greek (including Mariupol Greek and Urum), 0.11% spoke German, and 0.04% spoke Belarusian.

== Notable people ==
- Maksym Chekh, Ukrainian footballer
