= Velyka Novosilka Raion =

Former subdivision of Donetsk Oblast, Ukraine

Velykonovosilkivskyi Raion Великоновосілківський район
- Raion
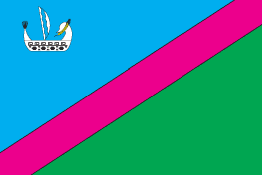
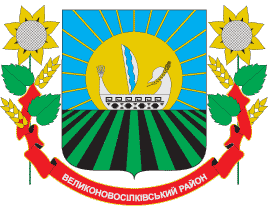
- Flag Coat of arms

- Coordinates: 47°50′28.3″N 36°50′8.2″E
- Country: Ukraine
- Oblast: Donetsk Oblast
- Established: 1923
- Disestablished: 18 July 2020
- Admin. center: Velyka Novosilka
- Subdivisions: List: 0 — city councils; 1 — settlement councils; 61 — rural councils; Number of localities: 0 — cities; 1 — urban-type settlements; 51 — villages; 15 — rural settlements

Government
  - Governor: Sergiy Dmitriev

Area
  - Total: 1,900 km^{2} (730 sq mi)

Population (2020)
  - Total: 37,144 ▼
  - Density: 20/km^{2} (51/sq mi)
- Time zone: UTC+02:00 (EET)
  - Summer (DST): UTC+03:00 (EEST)
- Postal index: 85500-84583
- Area code: +380 6243

Velyka Novosilka Raion (Ukrainian: Великоновосілківський район) was one of the raions (districts) of Donetsk Oblast, southeastern Ukraine, from 1923 to 2020. The administrative center of the raion was the urban-type settlement of Velyka Novosilka. The last estimate of the raion population was 37,144 (2020 est.).

== History ==
In 1932, it was included in the newly created Donetsk Oblast. At the time, it was referred to as a national raion for ethnic Greeks in Ukraine. Previously, it had been part of Dnipropetrovsk Oblast.

On 15 May 2014 (during the early phase of the War in Donbas) the Donbas Battalion secured the district from pro-Russian separatists loyal to the Donetsk People's Republic. According to (the then commander the Donbas Battalion) Semen Semenchenko the local police chief, deputies from the Party of Regions and the chairman of the district council "fled in an unknown direction."

The raion was abolished on 18 July 2020 as part of the administrative reform of Ukraine, which reduced the number of raions of Donetsk Oblast to eight, of which only five were controlled by the government.

== Demographics ==
According to the 2001 Ukrainian Census,

Ethnicity
Ukrainians	31,850	64.6%
Greeks	9,730	19.7%
Russians	6,568	13.3%
Belarusians	240	0.5%
Turks	168	0.3%
