= Mokri Yaly =

River in Ukraine

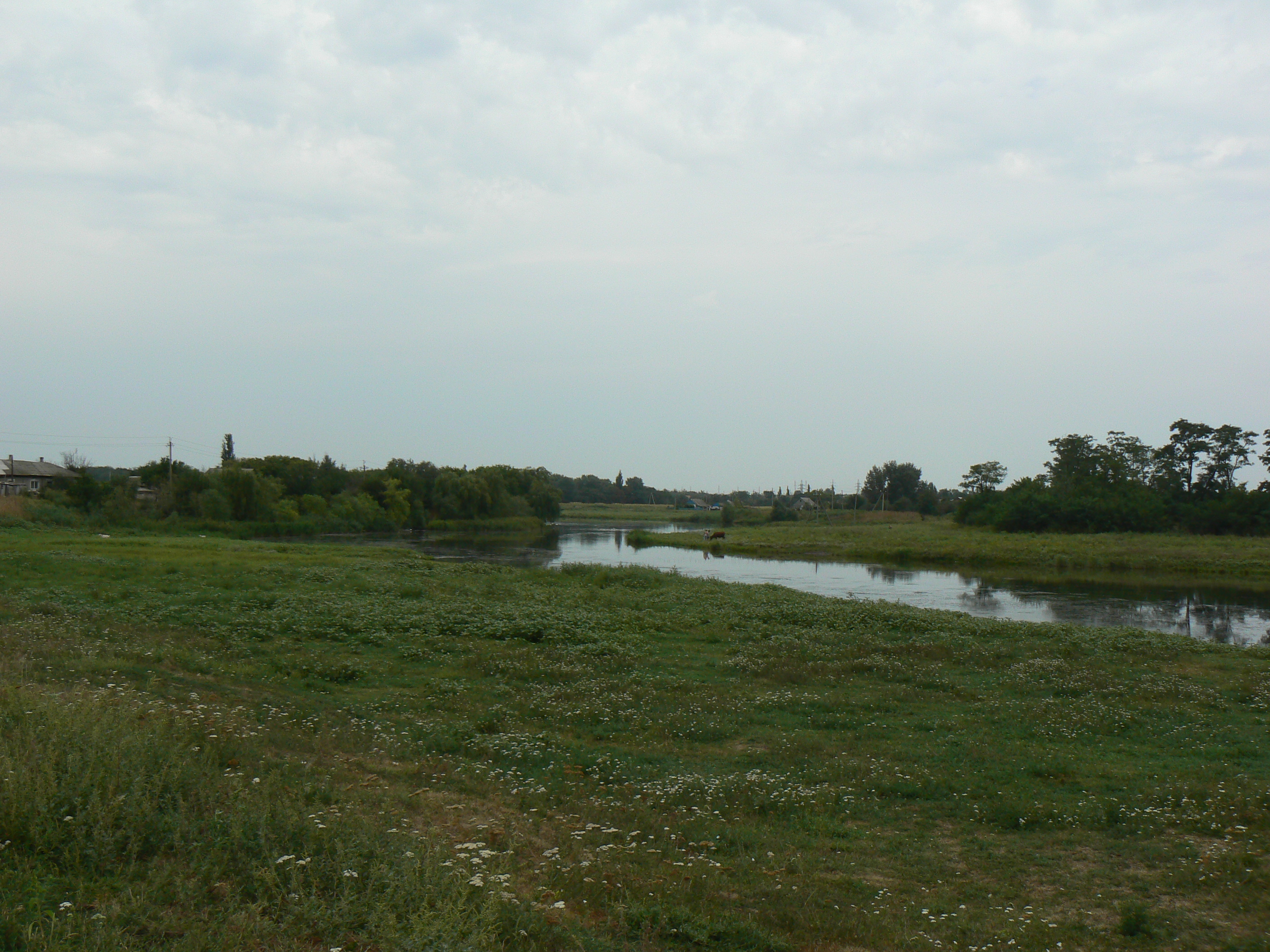
- The river near Staromlynivka

Location
- Country: Ukraine
- Cities: Volnovakha, Velyka Novosilka

Physical characteristics
- Source
  - location: Azov Upland
  - coordinates: 47°12′37″N 37°27′3″E
  - elevation: 205 m (673 ft)
- Mouth: Vovcha
  - location: Donetsk Oblast
  - coordinates: 48°3′54″N 36°44′19″E
  - elevation: 0 m (0 ft)
- Length: 147 km (91 mi)
- Basin size: 2,660 km^{2} (1,030 sq mi)

Basin features
- Progression: Vovcha→ Samara→ Dnieper→ Dnieper–Bug estuary→ Black Sea
- Tributaries
  - left: Kobylna, Sukhi Yaly, Tonka
  - right: Shaitanka, Kashlahach

The Mokri Yaly (Ukrainian: Мокрі Яли; Russian: Мокрые Ялы) is a river in western Donetsk Oblast, Ukraine. From its headwaters in Volnovakha, it flows roughly west and northwest to its confluence with the Vovcha river, which forms part of the Dnipropetrovsk Oblast boundary.

== Etymology ==
The name of the river roughly translates to 'wet shores', combining Ukrainian mokri 'wet' (plural) and Urum yaly 'shore'. Compare the names of the small tributary Sukha Yala 'dry shore' (feminine singular) and the sister tributary of the Vovcha Sukhi Yaly 'dry shores'. The river was known as Elkuvaty in older chronicles.

== Geography ==
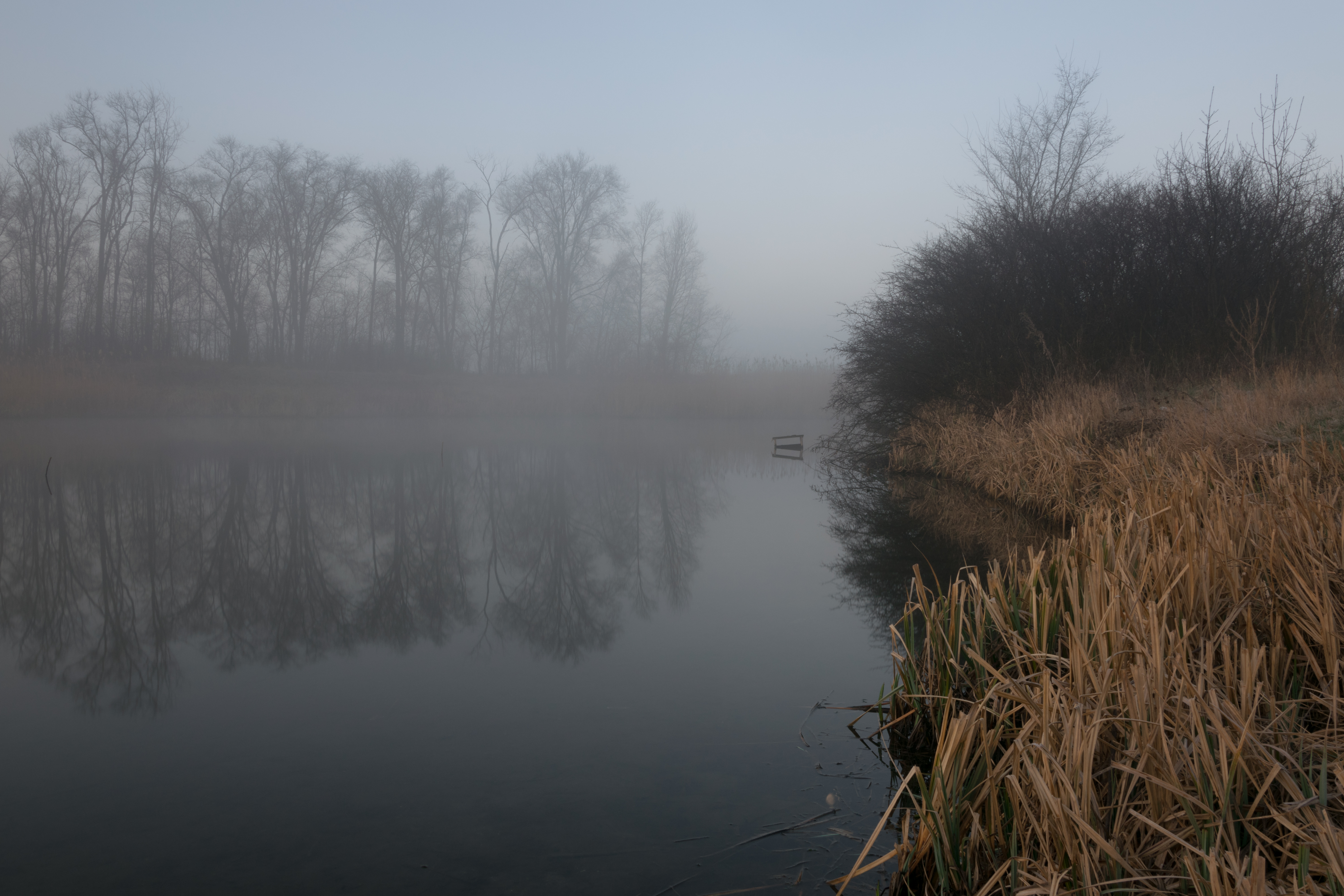
Mokri Yaly river in fog

The river is 147 km long. Beginning near Volnovakha in Donetsk Oblast, it flows northwards, through the town of Velyka Novosilka, where the Shaitanka and Kashlahach rivers join it, while smaller rivers like the Sukhа Yalа (or Balka Sukhi Yaly) and Kobylna join it elsewhere. The Mokri Yaly enters the Vovcha river near the border with Dnipropetrovsk Oblast. A dam near the village of Staromlynivka creates a reservoir used for irrigation and water supply.

== History ==
The river served as an important defensive line for German forces during World War II, where fortifications along the river formed part of the wider Mius-Front in which the Germans conducted a fighting withdrawal from the Soviet Union after the failure of Operation Barbarossa. After three days of heavy fighting, the Soviets crossed the river on 12 September 1943.

The river saw battle again during the Russian invasion of Ukraine. During the 2023 Ukrainian counteroffensive, the Ukrainian military pushed Russian forces away from Velyka Novosilka and captured various villages along the river's banks. The Ukrainian military accused Russian forces of destroying the dam next to the village of Kliuchove near Staromlynivka to slow the Ukrainian forces' advance. A few weeks later, Ukrainian forces were reported to have attempted to advance across the river with T-80 tanks.
