= Semenivka, Donetsk Oblast =

Village in Donetsk Oblast, Ukraine

Semenivka Семенівка
- Village
- Interactive map of Semenivka
- Location within Donetsk Oblast Location within Ukraine
- Coordinates: 48°10′57″N 37°37′52″E
- Country: Ukraine
- Oblast: Donetsk Oblast
- Raion: Pokrovsk Raion

Government
  - Type: Ocheretyne settlement hromada
- Elevation: 184 m (604 ft)

Population (2001 census)
  - Total: 182
- Time zone: UTC+2 (EET)
  - Summer (DST): UTC+3 (EEST)
- Postal code: 86050
- Area code: +380 6236
- KOATUU code: 1425584305
- KATOTTH code: UA14160190240019927

Semenivka (Ukrainian: Семенівка, romanized: Seménivka, Russian: Семёновка, romanized: Semjónovka) is a village in Pokrovsk Raion, Donetsk Oblast, Ukraine. During the Russian invasion of Ukraine, the Battle of Avdiivka and subsequent capture of the city by Russian forces led to the village eventually becoming a frontline settlement. While natural defensive lines including hills and a local water reservoir aided Ukrainian forces in the defense of the village, a lack of proper man-made defenses, alongside shortages in personnel and equipment, were cited by multiple Ukrainians as making the continued defense of the village particularly difficult in wake of simultaneous Russian attacks from positions in Berdychi in the northeast and Orlivka in the southeast. As of April 2024, the village is occupied by Russian forces.

== History ==
According to the 2001 Ukrainian census, the village had a population of 182 people, of whom 54.95% said that their native language was Russian, and 45.05% Ukrainian.

On 17 June 2020; Decree No. 33, Article 235 of the Verkhovna Rada placed the village in the administration of the Ocheretyne settlement hromada, also incorporating it into the significantly expanded Pokrovsk Raion.

=== Russian invasion of Ukraine ===
During the War in Donbas beginning in April 2014, the village was subject to multiple ground and aerial attacks by Russian forces due to its relative proximity to the frontline city of Avdiivka. One particular battle, which took place in the village sometime in 2016, destroyed multiple houses and pieces of infrastructure in the village. In the Russian invasion of Ukraine beginning in February 2022; after the conclusion of the Battle of Avdiivka on 17 February 2024 and the subsequent capture of the city by Russian forces, the village became a frontline settlement after closer settlements to the city were taken quickly in the days following. The "unusually rapid advance" of Russian forces in the villages leading up to Semenivka was cited by The New York Times as a result of poor local Ukrainian defense lines outside of the city, with natural barriers like hills and a water reservoir beside the village serving as the primary defensive line. Alongside Semenivka, the villages of Berdychi, Orlivka, and Tonenke were cited by the Ukrainian army chief Oleksandr Syrskyi as objectives in the Russian forces advance from the city. In March, the capture of Orlivka by Russian forces to the southeast of the village allowed attacks to take place on Semenivka simultaneously with other recently captured positions in Berdychi to the northeast of the village. On 28 March and 1 April, continued concerns about the lack of proper defensive lines, personnel, ammunition, and equipment to continue to defend Semenivka and other nearby villages was brought up by deputy commander of the 3rd Assault Brigade Maksym Zhorin and Ukrainian soldiers reporting to CNN, respectively.

== See also ==
- List of villages in Donetsk Oblast
