= Umanske =

Village in Donetsk Oblast, Ukraine

Umanske Уманське
- Village
- Interactive map of Umanske
- Location within Donetsk Oblast Location within Ukraine
- Coordinates: 48°09′16″N 37°33′55″E
- Country: Ukraine
- Oblast: Donetsk Oblast
- Raion: Pokrovsk Raion

Government
  - Type: Ocheretyne settlement hromada
- Elevation: 164 m (538 ft)

Population (2001 census)
  - Total: 176
- Time zone: UTC+2 (EET)
  - Summer (DST): UTC+3 (EEST)
- Postal code: 86050
- Area code: +380 6236
- KOATUU code: 1425584307
- KATOTTH code: UA14160190300027538

Umanske (Ukrainian: Уманське, Russian: Уманское, romanized: Umanskoye) is a village in Pokrovsk Raion, Donetsk Oblast, Ukraine. During the Russian invasion of Ukraine, the Battle of Avdiivka and subsequent capture of the city by Russian forces led to the village gaining the potential to become a frontline settlement after closer villages like Tonenke were taken in the days following. Between 30 March and 1 April, one of the largest Russian assaults of the war took place from Tonenke towards the village, but was stopped after incurring losses. On 9 May 2024, the village became disputed by Ukrainian and Russian forces after geolocated footage provided evidence of Russian forces moving into the center of the village.

== History ==
On 17 June 2020; Decree No. 33, Article 235 of the Verkhovna Rada placed the village in the administration of the Ocheretyne settlement hromada, also incorporating it into the significantly expanded Pokrovsk Raion.

=== Russian invasion of Ukraine ===
In the Russian invasion of Ukraine beginning in February 2022; after the conclusion of the Battle of Avdiivka on 17 February 2024 and the subsequent capture of the city by Russian forces: the village began to be targeted by Russian artillery, and gained the potential to become a frontline settlement after closer settlements to the city were taken quickly in the days following. One such village closer to the city, Tonenke, was cited by the General Staff of the Ukrainian Armed Forces as a potential staging ground for future attacks towards Umanske, being located only 4 km (2.5 mi) away from the settlement. Between 30 March and 1 April 2024, this assessment proved itself correct, after a large Russian assault consisting of 36 tanks and 12 infantry fighting vehicles was stopped by the 25th Airborne Brigade on its approach from Tonenke. The attack saw 12 Russian tanks and 8 infantry fighting vehicles be hit by Ukrainian forces before the assault was halted. The attack was cited as one of the largest single Russian assaults of the war at the time it was carried out. Further Russian artillery strikes on the village took place in the days following in preparation for future assaults, but remained under Ukrainian control for the remainder of the month.

On 9 May 2024, geolocated footage published by Russian forces provided evidence that the 114th Separate Guards Motor Rifle Brigade advanced into the center of the village, followed by reports from multiple Russian milbloggers of the full capture of the village. One milblogger disputed these claims, and no advances into the western or northern areas of the village had been reported. On 25 May, DeepStateMap.Live updated the village as captured. On 2 June, the Russian military officially said it had taken control over the village.

== Demographics ==
According to the 2001 Ukrainian census, the village had a population of 176 people, of whom 53.98% said that their native language was Ukrainian, 45.45% said Russian, and 0.57% said Belarusian.

== See also ==
- List of villages in Donetsk Oblast
