= Keramik, Ukraine =

Urban locality in Donetsk Oblast, Ukraine

Keramik Керамік
- Rural settlement
- Location of Keramik in Donetsk Oblast#Location of Keramik in Ukraine Keramik (Ukraine)
- Coordinates: 48°15′11″N 37°41′00″E
- Country: Ukraine
- Oblast: Donetsk Oblast
- Raion: Pokrovsk Raion
- Hromada: Ocheretyne settlement hromada
- Elevation: 188 m (617 ft)

Population (2022)
  - Total: 339
- Time zone: UTC+2
  - Summer (DST): UTC+3
- Postal code: 86022
- Area code: +380 6236

Keramik (Ukrainian: Керамік) is a rural settlement in Pokrovsk Raion, Donetsk Oblast, eastern Ukraine. Population: 339 (2022 estimate).

== History ==
=== Russo-Ukrainian War ===
==== Russian invasion of Ukraine ====
During the Russian invasion of Ukraine, Russian forces captured Keramik along its sister settlement Novokalynove.
