= Timeline of the war in Donbas (2017) =

- 2014; 2015; 2016; 2017; 2018; 2019; 2020; 2021; 2022

This is a timeline of the war in Donbas, from 1 January 2017. The timeline follows an ongoing conflict between Ukraine and anti-government pro-Russian separatists supported by Russian troops in the Donbas region in eastern Ukraine.

== January–March ==
- 7 January: The ATO HQ reported in the morning that pro-Russian troops had opened fire on 72 occasions on Ukrainian positions on Orthodox Christmas Day. Six Ukrainian servicemen were wounded. In the northern section of the demarcation line, 82 mm and 120 mm mortar volleys landed in Troitske, while Ukrainian redoubts at Novooleksandrivka and Novozvanivka were struck by small arms fire and rocket propelled grenades. Around Donetsk city, pro-Russian armoured fighting vehicles, supported by 82 mm mortars, opened fire on Ukrainian forces at Troitske. Nearby Pisky and Avdiivka became the target of small arms and rocket launchers. The same kind of weapons were used against Ukrainian troops at Luhanske, in the area of Horlivka. Three Ukrainian servicemen were wounded. Another pro-Russian incursion was repelled at Avdiivka. The official news agency of Donetsk People's Republic said that Ukrainian tanks shelled Leninske and Kominternove late on Orthodox Christmas Eve.
- 8 January: The spokesman of the Ukrainian operational headquarters reported that pro-Russian troops had opened fire on 51 occasions on Ukrainian positions, including on 11 occasions in the outskirts of Donetsk city, on 30 occasions in the region of Mariupol, and on 10 occasions in Luhansk region. Three Ukrainian servicemen were wounded. The spokesman of the Presidential Administration on issues related to ATO reported at noon that five Ukrainian servicemen were wounded in the Donbas region on 8 January. Pro-Russian officials at Donetsk city reported that Ukrainian forces opened fire on 521 occasions on rebel positions using small arms, grenade launchers, 82 mm mortars, 120 mm mortars, armoured fighting vehicles and tanks. The Ukrainian military attacked Zheleznaya Balka, Zaitseve, Dzerzhinsky, Yasinuvata, Oleksandrivka, Luhanske, Kominternove, Leninske and Sahanka. Ukrainian forces broke the ceasefire two times within the boundaries of the self-proclaimed Luhansk People's Republic, according to local sources. Armoured fighting vehicles from Luhanske, supported by 120 mm mortars, engaged pro-Russian positions at Lohvynove. Kalinivka was attacked with small arms, automatic grenade launchers and 82 mm mortars firing from Luhanske. According to the information published by the ATO press-centre in the evening, as of 6:00 pm pro-Russian forces had opened fire on Ukrainian positions 28 occasions. Pro-Russian tanks engaged Ukrainian redoubts at Talakivka, in the region of Mariupol. In the same area, 122 mm artillery barrages landed in Shyrokyne, which also became the target of small arms and grenade launchers. Mortar volleys hit Hnutove, Vodiane, Shyrokyne and Troitske. Shyrokyne also came under fire from armoured fighting vehicles, while small arms and rocket propelled grenade fire was reported at Pavlopil and Hnutove. In the northern section of the demarcation line, Ukrainian forces at Troitske were the target of 82 mm mortar and sniper fire. The rebels fired heavy machine guns at Novozvanivka. Around Donetsk city, the Ukrainian stronghold of Avdiivka came under small arms fire and was shelled with rocket launchers and 82 mm mortars. Nearby Marinka was fired at from armoured fighting vehicles. In the area of Horlivka, Ukrainian troops at Zaitseve were harassed with small arms and rocket propelled grenade fire, while armoured fighting vehicles attacked Luhanske. Three soldiers were reported wounded. Later in the evening, the ATO HQ reported that three Ukrainian servicemen became missing along the demarcation line. The servicemen were marines operating in the region of Mariupol. On 12 January the ATO spokesman said, that it is impossible to confirm or deny the deaths of three Ukrainian marines who went missing on 8 January without prior identification and forensic examinations. The Ukrainian Naval Forces revealed the names of three marines killed on 13 January.
- 12 January: According to the information provided by the spokesman of the Ukrainian operational headquarters, pro-Russian troops had opened fire on 78 occasions on Ukrainian positions by the end of the day (including on 16 occasions in the outskirts of Donetsk city, on 36 occasions in the region of Mariupol, and on 26 occasions in Luhansk region). Three Ukrainian servicemen were wounded. The casualties occurred in the area around Popasna. According to the information published by the ATO press-centre on their Facebook page in the evening, as of 6:00 pm pro-Russian forces had opened fire on Ukrainian positions 38 occasions. In the region of Mariupol, pro-Russian armoured fighting vehicles engaged Ukrainian forces at Talakivka. Pavlopil, Hnutove and Shyrokyne came under small arms and rocket propelled grenade fire. Sniper fire was reported at Shyrokyne. Around Donetsk city and Horlivka, rebel troops fired small arms, rocket launchers and mortars at Kamyanka, Avdiivka, Krasnohorivka, Marinka, Troitske, Luhanske and Zaitseve. In the northern sector of the demarcation line, 82 mm mortar barrages landed in Krymske and Ukrainian outposts at Zolote were fired at from small arms and grenade launchers. Ukrainian troops at Novooleksandrivka and Novozvanivka came under small arms fire. Three Ukrainian servicemen were wounded.
- 29 January: Beginning of the Battle of Avdiivka. The press center of the ATO HQ reported later in the morning that Ukrainian troops had suffered losses when pro-Russian forces launched an assault on Ukrainian positions in the industrial area of Avdiivka in the night of 28 January. The same sources told the press in the evening that as of 6:00 pm pro-Russian troops had opened fire on Ukrainian positions on 22 occasions. In the region of Mariupol, rebel forces fired small arms and grenade launchers at Hnutove, Pavlopil, Vodiane, Shyrokyne and Talakivka, Shyrokyne was also attacked by armoured fighting vehicles. Around Donetsk city, pro-Russian forces broke through the Ukrainian lines in Avdiivka twice, but their assaults were beaten off. Mortar volleys landed in Kamyanka, Opytne and Avdiivka, while pro-Russian tanks opened fire on Ukrainian redoubts in Pisky. Hostile tanks also attacked Novhorodske, west of Horlivka. In the same area, Luhanske and Zaitseve came under mortar fire. Four Ukrainian servicemen were killed and five others were wounded amid heavy fighting in Avdiivka. Five Ukrainian servicemen were killed, nine wounded and four injured in total in the Donbas.
- 30 January: The spokesman of the Ukrainian operational headquarters said that pro-Russian troops had opened fire on 71 occasions on Ukrainian positions (including on 40 occasions in the region of Mariupol, and on 10 occasions in Luhansk region). The spokesman of the Presidential Administration on issues related to ATO, Oleksandr Motuzyanyk, reported at noon that three Ukrainian servicemen were killed and twenty-four wounded and injured in the Donbas region on 30 January. Two of the fatalities occurred in Avdiivka, one in Opytne. Motuzyanyk also specified, that on 29 January not five but four Ukrainian soldiers were killed. Two civilians were injured by shelling in Avdiivka. One pro-Russian militant was captured by Ukrainian forces. Several attacks of pro-Russian forces on Ukrainian positions, that started in the area of Avdiivka at around 5:00 am, were beaten back by the Ukrainian military. The fighting between the warring parties continued on 30 January. Two Ukrainian servicemen were killed and five others wounded on the morning of 30 January. According to the information published by the ATO press-centre in the evening, as of 6:00 pm pro-Russian forces had opened fire on Ukrainian positions on 37 occasions. Around Donetsk city, pro-Russian tanks engaged the Ukrainian strongholds of Avdiivka and Pisky. Krasnohorivka was shelled with 82 mm mortars, while Nevelske, Opytne and Avdiivka became the target of small arms, rocket launchers, 82 mm mortars, 120 mm mortars, 122 mm and 152 mm self-propelled artillery. The same kind of weapons were used by the rebels to attack Luhanske, north of Horlivka. In the region of Mariupol, 152 mm artillery barrages landed in Vodiane, and 82 mm mortar volleys struck Lebedynske. Ukrainian troops at Pavlopil, Talakivka, Hnutove, Shyrokyne and Vodiane were engaged with small arms and grenade launchers. Three Ukrainian servicemen were killed, seventeen wounded, and three injured. A pro-Russian commander, two subordinates and two civilians were killed in Avdiivka, while a female civilian died to heavy shelling in Makiivka.
- 31 January: The ATO HQ reported that pro-Russian forces had opened fire on 86 occasions on Ukrainian positions (including on 45 occasions in the region of Mariupol and on 22 occasions in Luhansk region). The spokesman of the Presidential Administration on issues related to ATO reported at noon that one Ukrainian serviceman was killed in Tonenke and eighteen wounded (including 15 in Avdiivka) in action in the Donbas region on 31 January. Pro-Russian sources at Donetsk city reported that Ukrainian forces opened fire on 3,016 occasions on their positions using small arms, grenade launchers, 82 mm mortars, 120 mm mortars, armoured fighting vehicles, tanks, 122 mm self-propelled artillery, 152 mm self-propelled artillery and B-21 "Grad" multiple rocket launchers. The Ukrainian military targeted Donetsk city, Makiivka, Yasinuvata, Zaitseve, Nikolaevka, Krasnyi Partizan, Mykhailivka, Ozeryanivka, Shyroka Balka, Dolomitne, Holmivskyi, Yasinuvata, Spartak, Kruta Balka, Staromykhailivka, Oleksandrivka. Vasiliivka, Yakovlivka, Novomariivka, Bela Kamyanka, Sakhanka, Leninske, Dzerzhinsky and Kominternove. Two civilian residents were killed and five wounded. In the self-proclaimed Luhansk People's Republic, the Ukrainian military broke the ceasefire on eight occasions. Armoured fighting vehicles from Krymske engaged pro-Russian positions at Sokolniki, which also became the target of 120 mm mortar fire. Lohvynove and Kalinivka were shelled with 152 mm artillery firing from Luhanske and Mironovske, respectively. Smile received 82 mm mortar fire from Krymske, while 120 mm volleys fired from Novozvanivka landed in Kalynove. Pervomaisk was shelled with 82 mm mortars firing from Popasna. Fierce fighting continued on this date in and around the Ukrainian stronghold of Avdiivka, where a call for a local ceasefire was largely ignored by the warring parties. ATO spokesman Oleksandr Motuzyanyk expressed his "worries" about the right flank of the Ukrainian defences around Avdiivka, which was stormed by pro-Russian tanks. Motuzyanyk described the action as the largest tank offensive in the area since the fall of Donetsk airport in rebel hands in January 2015. The tanks, gathered at Spartak, charged through the demarcation line at Butivka mining complex and Pisky. The evacuation of civilian residents from Avdiivka was scheduled for 1 February due to the lack of essential services in the town after the relentless pro-Russian bombardment since 29 January. The local hospital was already evacuated in the afternoon. Almost one hundred BM-21 "Grad" artillery rockets landed in Avdiivka throughout the day. Paul Zhebrivskyi, head of the civilian administration of Donetsk Oblast, declared the state of emergency in the war-torn town.
- 2 February: The ATO HQ reported that pro-Russian forces had opened fire on 114 occasions on Ukrainian positions (including on 72 occasions in the region of Mariupol and on 15 occasions in Luhansk region). The spokesman of the Presidential Administration on issues related to ATO, Oleksandr Motuzyanyk, reported at noon that three Ukrainian servicemen were killed and eighteen wounded in action in the Donbas region on 2 February. One employee of the State Emergency Service was killed and another wounded, Motuzyanyk added. According to him, the fighting in all fronts was the most intense since 2014. Officials from the self-styled Luhansk People's Republic said that Ukrainian forces broke the truce on 11 occasions within the republic borders. Pro-Russian positions at Kalinivka were shelled six times from Luhanske and Svitlodarsk with automatic grenade launchers, 82 mm mortars, 120 mm mortars and 122 mm self-propelled artillery. Kalynove was struck four times by 120 mm mortars and 122 mm self-propelled artillery firing from Troitske, while 120 mm mortar volleys fired from Krymske landed in Slavyanoserbsk. By 2 February in the morning at least 145 civilians, and as of 5:00 pm 183 civilian residents, including 107 children, had been evacuated from Avdiivka. According to the information published by the ATO press-centre in the evening, as of 6:00 pm pro-Russian forces had opened fire on Ukrainian positions on 54 occasions. Incessant shelling continued on Avdiivka, where Ukrainian forces were repeatedly engaged by the rebels with small arms, rocket launchers, mortars, tanks and "Grad" multiple rocket launchers. Armoured fighting vehicles opened fire on Ukrainian redoubts in nearby Pisky, while Opytne and Marinka were shelled with 82 mm mortars, 120 mm mortars and 122 mm guns. Sniper fire was reported at Marinka. Meanwhile, mortar volleys landed in Luhanske, north of rebel-held Horlivka. In the region of Mariupol, "Grad" single tube rocket launchers were fired at Shyrokyne, which also became the target of 82 mm mortars, 120 mm mortars and 122 mm self-propelled artillery along with Vodiane and Chermalyk. Chermalyk was also hit by antitank guided missiles. Berezove and Vodiane were fired at from small arms, grenade launchers and antiaircraft artillery. In the northern front, the rebels fired mortars at Krymske and small arms and rocket launchers at Novozvanivka. Two Ukrainian servicemen were killed, nine were wounded. Two civilians were killed by shelling and two injured in Avdiivka at around 7:30 pm. One female civilian was injured by shelling in Marinka. Separatist sources claimed that an OTR-21 Tochka struck a rearguard area in the outskirts of Donetsk city, killing one civilian and wounding another two.
- 3 February: The ATO HQ reported that pro-Russian forces had opened fire on 115 occasions on Ukrainian positions (including on 65 occasions in the region of Mariupol and on 29 occasions in Luhansk region). The spokesman of the Presidential Administration on issues related to ATO, Oleksandr Motuzyanyk, reported at noon that three Ukrainian servicemen were killed and eight wounded in the Donbas region on 3 February. Two of the fatalities occurred near Halytsynivka, the third serviceman was killed at Troitske. According to local officials, Ukrainian forces broke the ceasefire ten times within the borders of the self-proclaimed Luhansk People's Republic. Kalinivka was shelled from Luhanske with 122 mm and 152 mm artillery, while Kalynove was fired at from Troitske and Novozvanivka with 120 mm mortars. Pro-Russian positions at Lozove were also hit by 120 mm mortar volleys fired from Luhanske. Veselehorivka became the target of 82 mm mortars firing from Troitske and the village of Kalynove-Borshchevate came under 120 mm mortar fire from Popasna. The press-centre of the ATO HQ reported in the evening that as of 6:00 pm pro-Russian forces had opened fire on Ukrainian positions on 66 occasions. In the disputed area surrounding Donetsk city, BM-21 "Grad" artillery rockets landed in Halytsynivka. Pro-Russian tanks attacked Pisky once again, while Avdiivka and Troitske were shelled with 82 mm mortars, 120 mm mortars, 122 mm and 152 mm artillery. Krasnohorivka and Marinka came under 82 mm and 120 mm mortar fire. North of Horlivka, Ukrainian forces at Luhanske were engaged with mortars, tanks and artillery. In the region of Mariupol, pro-Russian tanks opened fire on Shyrokyne, and Vodiane was fired at from armoured fighting vehicles. Chermalyk was struck by antitank guided missiles. "Grad" multiple rocket launchers, 122 mm and 152 mm self-propelled artillery pounded Ukrainian redoubts at Talakivka, while 82 mm and 120 mm mortar barrages landed in Novotroitske, Lebedynske, Pavlopil, Shyrokyne and Chermalyk, and rocket propelled grenades in Hnutove. Sniper fire was reported at Vodiane and Pavlopil. In the northern sector of the demarcation line, rebel forces shelled Novozvanivka with 152 mm artillery, 82 mm mortars and 120 mm mortars, Troitske and Popasna with 82 mm and 120 mm mortars and Krymske with rocket launchers. Two Ukrainian servicemen were killed, five wounded. A British photographer was wounded by shelling in Avdiivka at around 4:00 am. Ukraine awarded 94 servicemen of the Armed Forces and the National Guard—34 of them posthumously—for personal courage and selfless performance of military duty.
- 4 February: The head of the Luhansk People's Republic militia, Colonel Oleg Anashchenko, was killed along with another person while riding on an official car in Luhansk city when the vehicle struck an improvised explosive device. Pro-Russian authorities accused "Ukrainian intelligence agents" for his death. As of 7:00 am, 244 civilians, including 114 children, had been evacuated from Avdiivka, according to Ukrainian military spokesman Aleksandr Motuzyanyk.
- 8 February: Colonel Mikhail Tolstykh, better known by his callsign Givi was killed early in the morning in Makiivka when his office was hit by an RPO-A Shmel incendiary rocket. Military spokesman Eduard Basurin blamed Zorian Shkiryak, an adviser of the Ministry of Internal Affairs of Ukraine for his death.
- 18 February: The ATO HQ reported that pro-Russian forces had opened fire on 105 occasions on Ukrainian positions (including on 41 occasions in the outskirts of Donetsk city, on 50 occasions in the region of Mariupol, and on 14 occasions in Luhansk region). The spokesman of the Presidential Administration on issues related to ATO, Oleksandr Motuzyanyk, reported at noon that nine Ukrainian servicemen were wounded and injured, one serviceman went missing in the Donbas region on 18 February. Two major clashes between the warring parties took place around Avdiivka, Motuzyanyk added. During his daily briefing to the press, deputy minister of defence of the self-proclaimed Donetsk People's Republic, Eduard Basurin, reported that Ukrainian troops opened fire on 2,453 occasions on their positions over the past 24 hours. According to the statement, the Ukrainian military used small arms, grenade launchers, 82 mm mortars, 120 mm mortars, antiaircraft guns, armoured fighting vehicles, tanks, 122 mm and 152 mm self-propelled artillery to attack pro-Russian positions at Mikhaylivka, Dolomitne, Ozeryanivka, Dokuchaievsk, Starolaspa, Novolaspa, Belaya Kamyanka, Novomariivka, Staromariivka, Telmanove, Leninske, Sakhanka, Kominternove, Oktyabr, Bezimennne, Nova Tavrya, Yasinuvata, Krasnyi Partizan, Yakovliika, Zhabicheve, Spartak, Novonikolaevka, Novozhilivka, Olenovka, Luhanske, Staromykhailivka, Oleksandrovka, Petrovsky district and Donetsk airport. Ukrainian forces broke the ceasefire ten times within the boundaries of the self-proclaimed Luhansk People's Republic, according to local sources. Ukrainian BMP-1 armoured fighting vehicles from Novozvanivka and Troitske opened fire on pro-Russian positions at Kalynove, supported by automatic grenade launchers, 82 mm mortars and 120 mm mortars. BMP-1 armoured fighting vehicles also shelled Sokolniki and Almazne, which also became the target of automatic grenade launchers, 73 mm antitank recoilless guns and 82 mm mortars. Rebel forces at Lohvynove were engaged three times with small arms, automatic grenade launchers, 120 mm mortars and BMP-1 armoured fighting vehicles. In the area of Donetsk city, an engagement involving mortars, tanks and artillery between the warring parties was reported at Avdiivka, where Ukrainian forces were also fired at by small arms, heavy machine guns and grenade launchers. The same kind of weapons were used to attack the Ukrainian strongholds of Pisky, Troitske, Opytne and Nevelske. In the area of Horlivka, Ukrainian troops at Novoluhanske received sniper fire, while Zaitseve, Luhanske and Novoluhanske were the target of small arms, heavy machine guns and rocket launchers. In the region of Mariupol, pro-Russian armoured fighting vehicles opened fire on Ukrainian redoubts at Shyrokyne, while mortar barrages landed in Pavlopil and Vodiane. Rebel forces fired small arms and grenade launchers at Hnutove, Talakivka, Shyrokyne, Pavlopil and Vodiane. In the northern sector of the demarcation line, 82 mm and 120 mm mortar volleys landed in Novooleksandrivka and Krymske, which also became the target of antitank guided missiles. Rocket propelled grenades hit Ukrainian positions at Stanytsia Luhanska. Later in the night, a 36-rocket barrage from a BM-21 "Grad" multiple rocket launchers struck the surroundings of Vodiane. The strike lasted 30 minutes.
- 28 February: The ATO HQ reported that pro-Russian forces had opened fire on 117 occasions on Ukrainian positions (including on 44 occasions in the outskirts of Donetsk city, on 47 occasions in the region of Mariupol, and on 26 occasions in Luhansk region). The spokesman of the Presidential Administration on issues related to ATO, Andriy Lysenko, reported at noon that two Ukrainian servicemen were killed and four wounded in the Donbas region on 28 February. Sources from the self-proclaimed Luhansk People's Republic reported 20 Ukrainian violations of the truce inside the republic borders. Ukrainian forces used small arms, automatic grenade launchers, 73 mm antitank recoilless guns, 82 mm mortars, 120 mm mortars and armoured fighting vehicles to engage pro-Russian positions at Lozove, Nyzhne Lozove, Lohvynove, Kalinivka, Mariivka, Molodezhne and Kalynove. Two pro-Russian servicemen were killed, one was wounded. In the outskirts of Donetsk city, pro-Russian tanks engaged Ukrainian forces at Butivka mining complex. Avdiivka, Troitske and Kamyanka came under 82 mm and 120 mm mortar fire. The rebels also fired small arms and rocket launchers at Avdiivka, Nevelske and Verkhnyotoretske. In the area of Horlivka, 82 mm and 120 mm mortar volleys landed in Zaitseve, Luhanske and Novoluhanske. Zaitseve and Luhanske were also fired at by small arms and grenade launchers. In the region of Mariupol, the separatists shelled Vodiane with mortars and 122 mm self-propelled artillery. Mortar fire was also reported at Hnutove and Shyrokyne, while Ukrainian troops at Pavlopil, Talakivka and Hnutove became the target of small arms, heavy machine guns and rocket launchers. Sniper fire was reported at Shyrokyne and Novotroitske. In the northern front, Krymske was pounded by 152 mm artillery, while Ukrainian troops at Stanytsia Luhanska and Novooleksandrivka were harassed by small arms fire.
- 1 March: The spokesman of the Ukrainian operational headquarters said that pro-Russian troops had opened fire on 118 occasions on Ukrainian positions (including on 46 occasions in the outskirts of Donetsk city, on 52 occasions in the region of Mariupol, and on 20 occasions in Luhansk region). The spokesman of the Presidential Administration on issues related to ATO reported at noon that one Ukrainian servicemen was killed and nine others were wounded in the Donbas region on 1 March. Authorities from the self-proclaimed Luhansk People's Republic reported 19 Ukrainian violations of the ceasefire inside the republic boundaries. The Ukrainian military used small arms, automatic grenade launchers, 73 mm antitank recoilless guns, 82 mm mortars, 120 mm mortars and armoured fighting vehicles to target rebel positions at Frunze, Lozove, Nyzhne Lozove, Lohvynove, Kalynove, Kalynove-Borshchevate, Mikhaylivka and Kalinivka. The press-centre of the ATO HQ reported in the evening that as of 6:00 pm pro-Russian forces had opened fire on Ukrainian positions on 58 occasions. In the surroundings of Donetsk, rebel forces kept up their pressure on Avdiivka. Pro-Russian tanks and armoured fighting vehicles opened fire on the Ukrainian stronghold, supported by rocket launchers.and mortars. Novoselivka, Kamyanka and Pisky became the target of small arms and grenade launchers. The same kind of weapons were used by the separatists around Horlivka to pound Zaitseve and Novhorodske. In the region of Mariupol, 122 mm artillery barrages hit Vodiane and Shyrokyne, while at Novotroitske, Bohdanivka, Pavloipil and Chermalik came under mortar fire. The separatists also fired small arms, and rocket launchers at Talakivka, Pavlopil, Lebedinske and Shyrokyne. Heavy shelling was reported in the northern sector of the demarcation line. Troitske was shelled by 152 mm howitzer, and Krymske by 122 mm artillery. Novozvanivka, Zolote, Orekhove and Troitske were shelled with 82 mm mortars .
- 2 March: The ATO HQ reported in the morning that pro-Russian forces had opened fire on 116 occasions on Ukrainian positions (including on 30 occasions in the outskirts of Donetsk city, on 59 occasions in the region of Mariupol, and on 27 occasions in Luhansk region). The spokesman of the Presidential Administration on issues related to ATO, Andriy Lysenko, reported at noon that one Ukrainian serviceman was killed and twenty-two were wounded and injured in the Donbas region on 2 March. One civilian was injured by shelling in Zolote on 2 March, another civilian, a seventy-year-old female was injured in Krasnohorivka on 1 March. The National Police reported that five civilians had been killed and thirteen wounded in Avdiivka during the first two months of the year. Sources from the self-styled Luhansk People's Republic said that Ukrainian forces broke the ceasefire on 18 occasions within the republic borders. Pro-Russian positions at Smile, Molodezhne, Lohvynove, Kalinivka, Kalynove, Zholobok, Berezovske, Kalynove-Borshchevate and Pervomaisk became the target of small arms, grenade launchers, 73 mm antitank recoilless guns, 82 mm mortars, 120 mm mortars, BMP-2 armoured fighting vehicles and 152 mm artillery. The same sources reported 94 Ukrainian violations of the truce over the past week. According to the information published by the ATO press-centre in the evening, as of 6:00 pm pro-Russian forces had opened fire on Ukrainian troops on 78 occasions; one Ukrainian servicemen was killed, eight were wounded. West of Donetsk city, pro-Russian tanks continued their attacks on Ukrainian redoubts at Avdiivka and Butivka mining complex, supported by 82 mm and 120 mm mortars. Troitske and Avdiivka also became the target of antiaircraft guns, while rocket propelled grenades landed in Kamyanka, Opytne, Marinka and Pisky. Sniper fire harassed Ukrainian troops at Kamyanka and Marinka, and small arms fire was reported at Nevelske. In the area of Horlivka, armoured fighting vehicles, supported by heavy machine guns, opened fire on Ukrainian forces at Luhnaske. Ukrainian troops at Novhorodske received sniper fire. In the region of Mariupol 20 BM-21 "Grad" artillery rockets struck Ukrainian positions at Vodiane. Mortar barrages landed in Hnutove and Vodiane, while Shyrokyne, Starohnativka, Lebedinske, Talakivka. Sniper fire was reported at Shyrokyne and Lebedinske. Armoured fighting vehicles opened fire at Shyrokyne, Novohryhorivka and Hnutove. In the northern sector of the demarcation line, rebel forces shelled Novozvanivka with 152 mm artillery, while 82 mm and 120 mm mortars landed in Novoaleksandrivka, Novozvanivka, Katerinivka, Krymske and Malynove.
- 3 March: The spokesman of the Ukrainian operational headquarters said that pro-Russian troops had opened fire on 115 occasions on Ukrainian positions (including on 39 occasions in the outskirts of Donetsk city, on 49 occasions in the region of Mariupol, and on 27 occasions in Luhansk region). The spokesman of the Presidential Administration on issues related to ATO reported at noon that one Ukrainian serviceman and one border guard were wounded in the Donbas region on 3 March. Separatist officials in the city of Donetsk reported that Ukrainian troops opened fire on 1,948 occasions on their positions over the past 24 hours. According to the statement, the Ukrainian military used small arms, grenade launchers, 82 mm mortars, 120 mm mortars, antiaircraft guns, armoured fighting vehicles, 122 mm and 152 mm self-propelled artillery to attack pro-Russian positions at Zaitseve, Horlivka, Yasinuvata, Kruta Balka, Spartak, Kominternove, Telmanove, Sakhanka, Dokuchaievsk, Bezimenne, Oleksandrivka, Trudovske, and Donetsk airport. The press-centre of the ATO HQ reported in the evening that as of 6:00 pm pro-Russian forces had opened fire on Ukrainian positions on 62 occasions; one Ukrainian soldier was wounded. Around Donetsk city, heavy artillery rounds hit a Ukrainian outpost part of the combined center for control of the ceasefire in Avdiivka. The artillery fire also damaged an OSCE observation post. Pro-Russian tanks opened fire on other areas of the town, Earlier in the day, Avdiivka had been pounded by small arms, rocket launchers, 82 mm mortars and 120 mm mortars along with Butivka mining complex, Pisky, Krasnohorivka, Nevelske, Opytne and Verkhnetoretske. The same kind of weapons were fired at Luhanske and Zaitseve. In the region of Mariupol, Lebedinske was shelled by 122 mm artillery, while 120 mm mortar volleys landed in Vodiane and Shyrokyne. Pro-Russian armoured fighting vehicles engaged Ukrainian redoubts at Shyrokyne, and rebel troops fired small arms and heavy machine guns at Vodiane, Novotroitske, Shyrokyne, Talakivka and Novohryhorivka. Snipers fired at Ukrainian troops at Novotroitske and Vodiane. In the northern section of the demarcation line, mortar fire was reported at Katerinivka, Krymske and Novoaleksandrivka, while heavy machine guns, grenade launchers and antitank guided missiles were fired at Krymske, where Ukrainian positions were also engaged by Pro-Russian tanks. The prime minister of the self-styled Donetsk People's Republic, Alexander Zakharchenko, announced that the republic will impose their own "trade blockade" on Ukrainian goods. He said they will give preference to Russian products, specially coal. Zakharchenko also declares the nationalization of all private companies within the jurisdiction of the republic.
- 6 March: The ATO HQ reported in the morning that pro-Russian forces had opened fire on 122 occasions on Ukrainian positions (including on 35 occasions in the outskirts of Donetsk city, on 64 occasions in the region of Mariupol, and on 23 occasions in Luhansk region). The spokesman of the Presidential Administration on issues related to ATO reported at noon that one Ukrainian serviceman was killed and five others were wounded and injured in the Donbas region on 6 March. Pro-Russian sources at Donetsk city reported that Ukrainian forces opened fire on 2,927 occasions on their positions using small arms, grenade launchers, 82 mm mortars, 120 mm mortars, antiaircraft guns, armoured fighting vehicles, tanks, 122 mm and 152 mm self-propelled artillery and BM-21 "Grad" multiple rocket launchers. The main targets were Staromykhailivka, Trudovske, Signalne, Luhanske, Kruta Balka, Yasinuvata, Dokuchaievsk, Holmivskyi, Zaitseve, Telmanove, Sakhanka, Bezimenne, Kominternove and Leninske. Local sources recorded ten Ukrainian violations of the ceasefire within the boundaries of the self-proclaimed Luhansk People's Republic. The Ukrainian military engaged pro-Russian positions at Kalinivka, Pervomaisk, Kalynove, Frunze, Annivka and Smile using small arms, rocket launchers, automatic grenade launchers, 73 mm antitank recoilless guns, 82 mm mortars, 120 mm mortars, Zu-23-2 antiaircraft guns and armoured fighting vehicles. According to the information published by the ATO press-centre in the evening, as of 6:00 pm pro-Russian forces had opened fire on Ukrainian positions 40 occasions; one Ukrainian serviceman was wounded. Around Donetsk city, fighting continued in Avdiivka for the ninth consecutive day. Pro-Russian tanks opened fire on the Ukrainian redoubts in the town, which was also pounded by small arms, snipers, grenade launchers, 82 mm mortars, 120 mm mortars and 152 mm artillery. Shelling was also reported at Opytne and Marinka, while Ukrainian troops at Kamyanka were harassed by sniper fire. In the area of Horlivka, Zaitseve and Luhanske came under rebel fire. In the region of Mariupol, Lebedynske, Shyrokyne, and Novohryhorivka were shelled by grenade launchers, 82 mm mortars, 120 mm mortars and 122 mm artillery. Shyrokyne was also attacked by pro-Russian tanks and Novotroitske by heavy machine gun fire. In the northern section of the demarcation line, pro-Russian tanks engaged Ukrainian forces at Novozvanivka, while rocket propelled grenades landed in Zhovte and Krymske. A civilian was killed by shelling in Kurdiumivka.
- 31 March: Deputy chief of the counterintelligence department in the Donetsk region, Ukrainian Security Service (SBU) Lieutenant Colonel Oleksandr Kharaberiush, was killed by an improvised explosive device while driving his car in the streets of Mariupol. Intelligence sources blame pro-Russian separatists for his assassination.

== April–June ==
- 12 April: According to the information provided by the spokesman of the Ukrainian operational headquarters, pro-Russian troops had opened fire on 61 occasions on Ukrainian positions (including on 18 occasions in the outskirts of Donetsk city, on 35 occasions in the region of Mariupol, and on 8 occasions in Luhansk region). The spokesman of the Ministry of Defence on issues related to ATO, Oleksandr Motuzyanyk, reported at noon that one Ukrainian serviceman was killed and two Ukrainian soldiers were wounded in the Donbas region on 12 April. All the casualties occurred in the area of Avdiivka, Motuzyanyk added. Pro-Russian authorities at Donetsk city recorded 57 Ukrainian violations of the ceasefire using small arms, grenade launchers, 82 mm mortars, 120 mm mortars, antiaircraft guns, armoured personnel carriers, armoured fighting vehicles, tanks and 122 mm and 152 mm artillery. Heavy artillery fire was reported at Spartak, while Ukrainian tanks engaged pro-Russian strong points at Leninske. Mortar volleys struck the industrial area of Avdiivka, Petrovsky and Zaitseve. Two pro-Russian soldiers were killed and another wounded. The Ukrainian military broke the ceasefire on three occasions within the borders of the self-proclaimed Luhansk People' s Republic. Armoured fighting vehicles from Novozvanivka and Novooleksandrivka attacked Kalynove supported by small arms and automatic grenade launchers. The press-centre of the ATO HQ reported in the evening that as of 6:00 pm pro-Russian troops had opened fire on Ukrainian positions on 24 occasions; two Ukrainian soldiers were wounded. In the region of Mariupol, pro-Russian armoured fighting vehicles attacked Ukrainian outposts at Vodiane and Shyrokyne. Rebels forces fired heavy machine guns, rocket launchers and mortars at Hnutove, Vodiane, Talakivka and Shyrokyne. Sniper fire was also reported at Vodiane. In the outskirts of Donetsk city and Horlivka, rebel troops attacked Avdiivka with heavy machine guns, rocket launchers and antitank guided missiles. Nearby Kamyanka became the target of small arms, heavy machine guns and grenade launchers. Heavy machine gun fire, rocket propelled grenades and mortar barrages also hit Marinka. Armoured fighting vehicles opened fire on Ukrainian redoubts at Opytne. Small arms fire harassed Ukrainian forces at Pisky, while heavy machine guns and rocket launchers targeted the Ukrainian defenders of Zaitseve. In the northern section of the demarcation line, Novooleksandrivka, Novozvanivka and Krymske became the target of heavy machine guns and grenade launchers. Later in the evening one Ukrainian soldier was killed by shelling at Butivka coal mine. According to president Poroshenko Ukraine had lost 69 servicemen so far in 2017 (2,652 from the start of Russian invasion in 2014).
- 13 April: The ATO HQ reported that pro-Russian forces had opened fire on 65 occasions on Ukrainian positions (including on 3 occasions in Luhansk region, on 19 occasions in the outskirts of Donetsk city, and on 43 occasions in the region of Mariupol). The spokesman of the Ministry of Defence on issues related to ATO reported at noon that two Ukrainian servicemen were wounded in the Donbas region on 13 April. Pro-Russian sources at Donetsk city recorded 58 Ukrainian violations of the ceasefire using small arms, grenade launchers, 82 mm mortars, 120 mm mortars, antiaircraft guns, armoured personnel carriers, armoured fighting vehicles and tanks to engage pro-Russian positions in 19 locations. In the same briefing, the separatists reported that the Ukrainian military broke the ceasefire on 380 over the past week. Eight pro-Russian soldiers were killed and three wounded. Authorities from the self-styled Luhansk People's Republic said that there were 25 Ukrainian violations of the truce inside their boundaries on the same period. According to the information provided by the ATO press-centre in the evening, as of 6:00 pm pro-Russian forces had opened fire on positions manned by Ukrainian troops on 42 occasions; two Ukrainian servicemen were wounded. In the region of Mariupol, pro-Russian armoured fighting vehicles opened fire on Ukrainian forces at Vodiane and Shyrokyne. Vodiane was also shelled with 120 mm mortars and 122 mm artillery, while Shyrokyne was fired at by rocket launchers and 120 mm mortars. Ukrainian marine positions at Hnutove were likewise pounded by 120 mm mortar fire. Heavy machine gun fire was reported at Chermalyk, and snipers harassed Ukrainian troops at Talakivka and Vodiane. In the outskirts of Donetsk city and Horlivka, The Ukrainian strongholds of Avdiivka and Luhanske came under 82 mm and 120 mm mortar fire. Armoured fighting vehicles, supported by grenade launchers, 82 mm mortars and antitank guided missiles fired upon Ukrainian redoubts at Opytne. Rocket propelled grenades hit Ukrainian outposts near Nevelske, while Ukrainian soldiers at Butivka coal mine received small arms fire. Rebel forces in the northern sector of the demarcation line launched rocket propelled grenades at Ukrainian positions near Novooleksandrivka and Katerinivka. Inappropriate weapon handling resulted in death of two Ukrainian servicemen in the Donbas conflict zone.
- 25 April: The ATO HQ reported that pro-Russian forces had opened fire on 65 occasions on Ukrainian positions (including on 12 occasions in Luhansk region, on 21 occasions in the outskirts of Donetsk city, and on 32 occasions in the region of Mariupol). The spokesman of the Ministry of Defence on issues related to ATO reported at noon that three Ukrainian servicemen were killed and five wounded in the Donbas region on 25 April. Officials from the self-proclaimed Luhansk People's Republic recorded five Ukrainian violations of the ceasefire inside the republic boundaries. The Ukrainian military employed small arms, grenade launchers, automatic grenade launchers, 73 mm antitank recoilless guns, 82 mm mortars, 120 mm mortars and BMP-1 vehicles to pound pro-Russian positions at Lohvynove, Smile, Nyzhne Lozove and Zhovte. According to the information provided by the ATO press-centre in the evening, as of 6:00 pm pro-Russian troops had opened fire on Ukrainian troops on 23 occasions, one Ukrainian serviceman was killed, another was wounded. In the areas of Donetsk city and Horlivka, pro-Russian armoured personnel carriers engaged Ukrainian positions at Pisky, supported by heavy machine gun fire and rocket launchers. Opytne and Kamyanka came under 120 mm mortar fire. while Avdiivka and Kamyanka became the target of snipers, heavy machine guns, grenade launchers and 120 mm mortars. Butivka mining complex was shelled with 82 mm mortars. Zaitseve and Troitske were fired at by heavy machine guns, grenade launchers and armoured fighting vehicles. Novhorodske received fire from snipers, heavy machine guns and Zu-23-2 cannons. Armoured fighting vehicles shelled Verkhnyotoretske. In the region of Mariupol, armoured fighting vehicles attacked Ukrainian marines strong points around Shyrokyne and Vodiane. Vodiane was also fired at by small arms, grenade launchers and 82 mm mortars. Novotroitske was meanwhile the target of snipers, automatic grenade launchers and 120 mm mortars. Rocket propelled grenades and 82 mm mortar volleys landed in Hnutove. In the northern sector of the demarcation line, armoured personnel carriers opened fire on Ukrainian redoubts at Novooleksandrivka and Novozvanivka, while small arms and automatic grenade launchers were fired at Valuiske and Zhovte. Novooleksandrivka also became the target of Zu-23-2 antiaircraft guns and 122 mm artillery.
- 28 April: According to the information provided by the spokesman of the Ukrainian operational headquarters, pro-Russian troops had opened fire on 70 occasions on Ukrainian positions (including on 16 occasions in the outskirts of Donetsk city, on 35 occasions in the region of Mariupol, and on 19 occasions in Luhansk region). The spokesman of the Ministry of Defence on issues related to ATO reported at noon that two Ukrainian servicemen were killed and six others were wounded in the Donbas region on 28 April. Local sources reported ten Ukrainian violations of the truce in the self-styled Luhansk People's Republic. The Ukrainian military attacked pro-Russian positions at Dolge, Pervomaisk, Frunze, Almazna, Lozove, Veselehorivka and Knyaz Igor memorial with small arms, rocket launchers, 82 mm mortars, 120 mm mortars, armoured fighting vehicles and 152 mm artillery. One rebel soldier was wounded in action. The press-centre of the ATO HQ reported in the evening that as of 6:00 pm pro-Russian troops had opened fire on Ukrainian positions on 31 occasions, two Ukrainian servicemen were killed, five wounded. In the region of Mariupol, pro-Russian armoured personnel carriers and armoured fighting vehicles engaged Ukrainian marines at Shyrokyne, while Pavlopil and Vodiane were attacked with small arms, heavy machine guns, rocket launchers and armoured fighting vehicles. Ukrainian troops at Hnutove were harassed with heavy machine gun fire. In the areas around Donetsk city and Horlivka, Krasnohorivka was shelled by rocket launchers, Zu-23-2 antiaircraft guns, 82 mm and 120 mm mortars. Heavy machine guns, grenade launchers, 82 mm and 120 mm mortars were likewise used to pound Avdiivka. Zaitseve became the target of antitank rockets, while 82 mm and 120 mm mortar volleys landed in Luhanske. In the northern sector of the demarcation line, rebel forces shelled Nyzhne with 120 mm mortars and Novotoshkivke with 82 mm mortars. Rocket propelled grenades landed in Krymske, and Popasna came under heavy machine gun fire, In some occasions, Ukrainian forces returned fire. One of the fatalities occurred near Pavlopil, where a truck hit an unidentified explosive device.
- 2 May: According to the information provided by the spokesman of the Ukrainian operational headquarters, pro-Russian troops had opened fire on 63 occasions on Ukrainian positions (including on 15 occasions in the outskirts of Donetsk city, on 30 occasions in the region of Mariupol, and on 18 occasions in Luhansk region). The spokesman of the Ministry of Defence on issues related to ATO reported at noon that one Ukrainian serviceman was killed and seven others were wounded in the Donbas region on 2 May. According to local officials, the Ukrainian military broke the truce on three occasions within the republic borders. Kalinivka, Khoroshche and Kalynove became the target of small arms, automatic grenade launchers, 73 mm antitank recoilless guns, 120 mm mortars, BMP-1 and BMP-2 armoured vehicles. The press-centre of the ATO HQ reported in the evening that as of 6:00 pm pro-Russian troops had opened fire on Ukrainian troops on 28 occasions, four Ukrainian soldiers were wounded. In the outskirts of Donetsk city and Horlivka, The rebels pounded Zaitseve and Luhanske with 82 mm and 120 mm mortar fire respectively. Avdiivka became the target of sniper fire and antitank rockets, while Krasnohorivka was fired at by heavy machine guns and grenade launchers. Pro-Russian armoured fighting vehicles also shelled Zaitseve. In the region of Mariupol, Rocket propelled grenades landed in Pavlopil. Ukrainian positions at Shyrokyne, Vodiane and Hnutove were struck by heavy machine gun fire and rocket propelled grenades. Intense sniper fire was also reported at Hnutove, which also received Zu-23-2 antiaircraft fire. Armoured fighting vehicles opened fire on Ukrainian forces near Vodiane. In the northern section of the demarcation line, the separatists engaged Ukrainian positions at Krymske and Novozvanivka with heavy machine guns, rocket launchers, 82 mm and 120 mm mortars. Katerinivka and Troitske came under 82 mm mortar fire. Katerinivka also became the target of rocket launchers. Rebel forces also fired heavy machine guns and grenade launchers at Novozvanivka. Ukrainian troops returned fire with automatic grenade launchers. Later in the evening, one Ukrainian soldier was killed in action in Avdiivka, when Ukrainian positions came under heavy machine gun and mortar fire.
- 5 May: The ATO HQ reported that pro-Russian forces had opened fire on 63 occasions on Ukrainian positions (including on 15 occasions in the outskirts of Donetsk city, on 34 occasions in the region of Mariupol, and on 14 occasions in Luhansk region). The spokesman of the Ministry of Defence on issues related to ATO reported at noon that five Ukrainian servicemen were wounded in the Donbas region on 5 May. One Ukrainian serviceman died of wounds in a hospital. Officials from the self-styled Luhansk People's Republic reported seven Ukrainian violations of the ceasefire within the republic boundaries. The Ukrainian military engaged pro-Russian positions at Zholobok, Kalinivka, Krasnyi Yar, Frunze, and Veselehorivka using small arms, rocket launchers, automatic grenade launchers, 73 mm antitank recoilless guns, Zu-23-2 antiaircraft guns and armoured fighting vehicles. According to the information provided by the ATO press-centre in the evening, as of 6:00 pm pro-Russian troops had opened fire on Ukrainian troops on 19 occasions, one Ukrainian serviceman was wounded. In the outskirts of Donetsk city and Horlivka, pro-Russian armoured fighting vehicles opened fire on Ukrainian positions around Krasnohorivka, supported by heavy machine gun fire and rocket propelled grenades. Ukrainian forces at Avdiivka, Kamyanka, troitske and Zaitseve were likewise attacked with heavy machine guns and grenade launchers. In the region of Mariupol, the Ukrainian stronghold of Pavlopil became the target of heavy machine guns, rocket launchers and 120 mm mortars. Heavy machine gun fire was reported at Novohryhorivka and small arms fire at Hnutove and Lebedinske. In the northern section of the demarcation line, rebel forces opened fire with multiple weapons on Ukrainian strong points at Krymske, Novozvanovka, Troitske, Novoaleksandrivka and Donets.
- 7 May: The ATO HQ reported that pro-Russian forces had opened fire on 65 occasions on Ukrainian positions (including on 21 occasions in the outskirts of Donetsk city, on 24 occasions in the region of Mariupol, and on 20 occasions in Luhansk region). The spokesman of the Ministry of Defence on issues related to ATO reported at noon no casualties in the Donbas region on Sunday, 7 May. Pro-Russian sources in Donetsk city reported 43 Ukrainian violations of the ceasefire. The Ukrainian military used small arms, grenade launchers, 82 mm mortars, 120 mm mortars, armoured personnel carriers, armoured fighting vehicles and tanks to pound pro-Russian positions at Horlivka, Zaitseve, Verkhnyotoretske, Kominternove, Sosnovske, Leninske, Sakhanka, Oktyabr, Yasinuvata, Yakovliivka, Vasiliivka, Vesele, Zhabicheve, Spartak, Yasne, Dokuchaievsk, Kirov district, Petrovsky district and Donetsk airport. Authorities from the self-proclaimed Luhansk People's Republic said that Ukrainianforces broke the ceasefire on 11 occasions within the republic borders. The Ukrainian army used automatic grenade launchers, 73 mm antitank recoilless guns, 82 mm mortars, 120 mm mortars and armoured fighting vehicles to shell pro-Russian positions at Pervomaisk, Frunze, Kalynove and Sokolniki. Sources from the Donetsk People's Republic claimed that prime minister Alexander Zakharchenko was the target of an assassination attempt with explosive devices on his way to a Victory Day commemoration at Savur -Mohyla. According to the information provided by the ATO press-centre in the evening, as of 6:00 pm pro-Russian troops had opened fire on Ukrainian troops on 27 occasions. In the surroundings of Donetsk city and Horlivka, Ukrainian positions around Troitske were engaged by heavy machine guns, rocket launchers, 82 mm mortars, 120 mm mortars and armoured fighting vehicles. Luhanske and Zaitseve came under heavy machine gun and rocket propelled grenade fire, while armoured fighting vehicles, supported by 82 mm and 120 mm mortars, opened fire on Opytne and Verkhnyotoretske, where heavy machine gun fire was also reported. Ukrainian forces at Avdiivka were fired at by heavy machine guns and grenade launchers, by heavy machine guns and 82 mm mortars at Krasnohorivka and by Zu-23-2 antiaircraft guns at Nevelske. In the region of Mariupol, pro-Russian armoured fighting vehicles attacked Vodiane, which was also hit by heavy machine gun fire, rocket propelled grenades and antitank guided missiles. Pro-Russian armoured personnel carriers engaged Ukrainian redoubts at Pavlopil, while small arms fire harassed Ukrainian troops at Hnutove, Novoselivka and Lebedinske. Armoured fighting vehicles shelled Ukrainian marines' positions at Shyrokyne. In the northern section of the demarcation line, rebel troops used heavy machine guns, rocket launchers and 120 mm mortars to attack Novozvanivka and Krymske.
- 9 May:The ATO HQ reported that pro-Russian forces had opened fire on 70 occasions on Ukrainian positions (including on 22 occasions in the outskirts of Donetsk city, on 35 occasions in the region of Mariupol, and on 13 occasions in Luhansk region). The spokesman of the Ministry of Defence on issues related to ATO, Andriy Lysenko, reported at noon that one Ukrainian serviceman was killed and two others were wounded in the Donbas region on 9 May. Two servicemen of the National Guard were injured by explosion of an explosive device, Lysenko added. Pro-Russian officials at Donetsk city reported 61 Ukrainian violations of the ceasefire in 21 locations using small arms, grenade launchers, 82 mm mortars, 120 mm mortars, armoured personnel carriers, armoured fighting vehicles, tanks, 122 mm and 152 mm artillery. The Ukrainian army opened fire on pro-Russian redoubts at Zaitseve, Horlivka, Ozerianivka, Krasnyi Partyzan, Shyroka Balka, Zhelizna Balka, Mykhailivka, Bila Kamianka, Kominternove, Sosnovske, Leninske, Dzerzhinskyi, Sakhanka, Bezimenne, Oktiabr, Kruta Balka, Yasynuvata, Vasiliivka, Yakovliivka, Mineralne, Spartak, Dokuchaievsk, Kuibyshev district, Kirov district, Petrovskyi district and Donetsk airport. One pro-Russian soldier was killed and another wounded. Sources from the self-styled Luhansk People's Republic reported five Ukrainian violations of the ceasefire within the republic boundaries. The Ukrainian military engaged pro-Russian positions at Frunze and Lohvynove using small arms, automatic grenade launchers, 82 mm mortars, 120 mm mortars and armoured fighting vehicles. According to the information provided by the ATO press-centre in the evening, as of 6:00 pm pro-Russian troops had opened fire on Ukrainian troops on 32 occasions, one Ukrainian serviceman was killed and another wounded. Pro-Russian tanks engaged Ukrainian marines' strong points around Vodiane, in the region of Mariupol. The same location also became the target of small arms, heavy machine guns and rocket launchers. Rocket propelled grenades and 120 mm mortar volleys landed in Pavlopil. Lebedinske and Shyrokyne were likewise shelled with 120 mm mortars. Rebel forces fired small arms, heavy machine gun and antitank rockets at Chermalyk, while Ukrainian troops at Starohnativka received automatic fire. Hnutove was fired at by small arms and grenade launchers. In the area around Donetsk city and Horlivka, the separatists used multiple weapons to attack Ukrainian positions at Avdiivka, Verkhnetoretske, Kamyanka, Luhanske and Zaitseve. In the northern sector of the demarcation line, rebel troops fired heavy machine guns and 82 mm mortars at Ukrainian redoubts near Novozvanivka, while Valuiske and Krymske were shelled with automatic grenade launchers. The Ukrainian military fired back on several of occasions.
- 10 May: The press-centre of the ATO HQ reported that by the end of the day pro-Russian troops had opened fire on Ukrainian troops on 37 occasions. In the region of Mariupol, Ukrainian marines at Shyrokyne were attacked with small arms, armoured personnel carriers, armoured fighting vehicles, tanks and "Grad-P" single rocket launchers. At Novoselivka, Ukrainian positions were hit by heavy machine guns and antitank rockets, while marines in the Ukrainian strongholds of Hnutove and Pavlopil were harassed with small arms and rocket propelled grenade fire. Around Donetsk city and Horlivka, rebel forces fired small arms, rocket launchers and 82 mm mortars at Ukrainian redoubts near Zaitseve. Pro-Russian armoured fighting vehicles, meanwhile, engaged Ukrainian positions at Troitske and Novhorodske, which also came under small arms and heavy machine gun fire. Antitank rockets landed in Pisky. In the northern section of the demarcation line, Krymske became the target of small arms, heavy machine guns and rocket launchers. Automatic grenade launchers were fired at Valuiske. Ukrainian forces returned fire on several occasions.
- 5 June: According to the information provided by the spokesman of the Ukrainian operational headquarters, pro-Russian troops had opened fire on 77 occasions on Ukrainian positions (including on 26 occasions in the outskirts of Donetsk city, on 39 occasions in the region of Mariupol, and on 12 occasions in Luhansk region). The spokesman of the Ministry of Defence on issues related to ATO reported at noon that four Ukrainian servicemen were wounded in the Donbas region on 5 June. Pro-Russian officials at Donetsk city reported 71 Ukrainian violations of the ceasefire using small arms, grenade launchers, 82 mm mortars, 120 mm mortars, armoured personnel carriers, armoured fighting vehicles, tanks, 122 mm and 152 mm artillery. Ukrainian forces attacked pro-Russian positions in 26 locations, among them Horlivka, Kominternove, Kruta Balka, Staromykhailivka, Dokuchaievsk, Spartak, Yasinuvata, Mineralne, Vasiliivka, Zhabicheve, Lozove, Yakovliivka, Styla, Petrovske, Vesele, Petrovsky district and Donetsk airport. Seven civilian residents were wounded. The press-centre of the ATO HQ reported in the evening that as of 6:00 pm pro-Russian troops had opened fire on Ukrainian troops on 31 occasions, three Ukrainian soldiers were wounded. In the region of Mariupol, rebel forces fired automatic weapons, rocket launchers, 82 mm and 120 mm at Ukrainian positions at Bohdanivka, Pavlopil and Chermalyk. In the outskirts of Donetsk city and Horlivka, 120 mm mortar volleys hit Pisky and Krasnohorivka, where two civilian residences were damaged, Pro-Russian tanks engaged Ukrainian strong points at Avdiivka and Pisky. The separatists also pounded Avdiivka with automatic weapons and 120 mm mortars. Heavy machine gun fire was reported at Opytne, while rocket propelled grenades and 120 mm mortar volleys landed in Zaitseve. In the northern sector of the demarcation line, Novotoshkivke was shelled with 120 mm mortars. Ukrainian forces at Bohulavske were harassed with small arms fire.
- 6 June: The ATO HQ reported that pro-Russian forces had opened fire on 85 occasions on Ukrainian positions (including on 28 occasions in the outskirts of Donetsk city, on 25 occasions in the region of Mariupol, and on 32 occasions in Luhansk region). The spokesman of the Ministry of Defence on issues related to ATO reported at noon that eight Ukrainian servicemen were wounded in the Donbas region on 6 May. According to the information provided by the ATO press-centre in the evening, as of 6:00 pm pro-Russian troops had opened fire on Ukrainian troops on 46 occasions, four Ukrainian servicemen were wounded. In the region of Mariupol, separatist forces shelled Chermalyk with 120 mm mortars and BM-21 "Grad" multiple rocket launchers. Ukrainian positions at Vodiane received small arms and rocket fire. Hostile snipers harassed Ukrainian troops at Hnutove. In the northern sector of the demarcation line, heavy shelling was reported at Novotoshkivke and Krymske, where Ukrainian redoubts were fired at by 82 mm mortars, 120 mm mortars, 122 mm and 152 mm artillery. Troikhizbenka came under 120 mm mortar fire, while Novooleksandrivka was hit by small arms fire, rocket propelled grenades and 82 mm mortars. In the surroundings of Donetsk city and Horlivka, 82 mm mortar barrages struck Zaitseve and Verkhnyotoretske. Ukrainian forces at Novhorodske received small arms fire, while light weapons and 82 mm mortars were fired at Ukrainian outpost near Avdiivka. Pro-Russian tanks, supported by heavy machine guns, opened fire on Ukrainian troops at Troitske. A farm at Novoluhanske was set on fire by Zu-23-2 antiaircraft artillery.
- 7 June: According to the information provided by the spokesman of the Ukrainian operational headquarters, pro-Russian troops had opened fire on 71 occasions on Ukrainian positions (including on 20 occasions in the outskirts of Donetsk city, on 28 occasions in the region of Mariupol, and on 23 occasions in Luhansk region). The spokesman of the Ministry of Defence on issues related to ATO reported at noon that two Ukrainian servicemen were killed and another eleven wounded and injured in the Donbas region on 7 June. The Ukrainian military said that the situation around Zholobok was "stabilized." The source acknowledged the death of one soldier and eight others wounded in the clashes. Pro-Russian authorities reported two soldiers killed and one wounded, and denied reports claiming the fall of Zholobok in Ukrainian hands. The press-centre of the ATO HQ reported in the evening that as of 6:00 pm pro-Russian troops had opened fire on Ukrainian troops on 34 occasions, two Ukrainian soldiers were killed, eleven wounded. In the northern section of the demarcation line, pro-Russian armoured fighting vehicles opened fire on Ukrainian positions at Krymske and Novotoshkivke which was also the target of heavy machine guns, grenade launchers, 82 mm mortars, 120 mm mortars, 122 mm and 152 mm artillery. Rocket propelled grenades landed in Zolote and Stanytsia Luhanska. Heavy machine gun fire was reported at Novooleksandrivka. In the region of Mariupol, BM-21 "Grad" multiple rocket launchers were fired at Chermalyk, while 120 mm mortar volleys landed in Shyrokyne. Rebel forces used small arms and rocket launchers against Ukrainian redoubts at Vodiane and Pavlopil. In the outskirts of Donetsk city and Horlivka, Avdiivka was shelled with banned 122 mm artillery. Ukrainian troops at Zaitseve and Luhanske were harassed with light weapons fire and 82 mm mortars. Marinka became the target of small arms and rocket launchers.
- 10 June: The spokesman of the Ukrainian operational headquarters reported that pro-Russian troops had opened fire on 73 occasions on Ukrainian positions (including on 21 occasions in the outskirts of Donetsk city, on 29 occasions in the region of Mariupol, and on 23 occasions in Luhansk region). According to the information provided by the ATO press-centre in the evening, as of 6:00 pm pro-Russian troops had opened fire on Ukrainian troops on 31 occasions, two Ukrainian servicemen were wounded. In the region of Mariupol, pro-Russian fighters shelled Chermalyk with 82 mm mortars and "Grad-P" single-round rocket launchers. Ukrainian troops at Vodiane and Pavlopil were fired at by small arms and grenade launchers, while 82 mm volleys landed in Slavne. In the outskirts of Donetsk city and Horlivka, the rebels fired 120 mm mortars at Avdiivka and Verkhnyotoretske, and 82 mm mortars at Krasnohorivka and Marinka. Ukrainian troops at Kamyanka, Zaitseve and Luhanske were harassed with small arms fire and rocket propelled grenades. In the northern section of the demarcation line, 82 mm mortar barrages struck Krymske, and small arms and rocket launchers were fired at Ukrainian troops at Valuiske, Stanytsia Luhanska, Troitske and Donetz.

== July–September ==
- 9 July: The ATO HQ reported that pro-Russian forces had opened fire on 38 occasions on Ukrainian positions — including on 10 occasions in Luhansk region, on 8 occasions in the outskirts of Donetsk city, and on 20 occasions in the region of Mariupol. The spokesman of the Ministry of Defence on issues related to ATO reported at noon no casualties in the Donbas region on 9 July. One Ukrainian soldier died in a hospital of wounds he had suffered in the region of Mariupol on 29 June. The press-centre of the ATO HQ reported in the evening that as 6:00 pm pro-Russian forces had opened fire on Ukrainian positions on 10 occasions, no casualties were reported. In the region of Mariupol, rebel forces attacked the Ukrainian strongholds of Shyrokyne, Vodiane, Pavlopil and Hnutove with small arms, heavy machine guns, rocket launchers and armoured fighting vehicles. Berezove, Novomyhailivka and Novotroitske received 120 mm mortar fire. In the outskirts of Donetsk city, Ukrainian troops at Avdiivka became the target of light weapons, 82 mm and 120 mm mortars. Nearby Krasnohorivka was likewise shelled by 120 mm mortars, while Marinka came under small arms, heavy machine gun and rocket propelled grenade fire. Later in the evening, antitank rockets hit the area of Verkhnyotoretske. In the northern section of the demarcation line, pro-Russian armoured fighting vehicles engaged Ukrainian redoubts at Novooleksandrivka. The separatists also attacked the Ukrainian garrison at Novozvanivka with heavy machine guns, rocket launchers and 82 mm mortars. Krymske was fired at by heavy machine guns, antitank rockets and 120 mm mortars, while small arms fire was reported at Zolote, Donetz and Zhovte. Rocket propelled grenades landed in Malinove.
- 12 July: The spokesman of the Ukrainian operational headquarters, pro-Russian troops had opened fire on 30 occasions on Ukrainian positions (including on 12 occasions in the outskirts of Donetsk city, on 10 occasions in the region of Mariupol, and on 8 occasions in Luhansk region). The spokesman of the Ministry of Defence on issues related to ATO reported at noon that one Ukrainian serviceman was killed and another wounded in the Donbas region on 12 July. According to the information provided by the ATO press-centre in the evening, as of 6:00 pm pro-Russian forces had opened fire on positions of Ukrainian troops on 7 occasions. In the surroundings of Donetsk city and Horlivka, pro- Russian tanks engaged Ukrainian positions at Luhanske. Ukrainian forces at nearby Zaitseve and Troitske were meanwhile attacked by armoured fighting vehicles. Troitske was also shelled with 82 mm mortars. Small arms, heavy machine guns and antitank rockets were fired at Butivka mining complex and Verkhnyotoretske. In the region of Mariupol, small arms fire was reported at Vodiane. Ukrainian troops at Krymske, in the northern section of the demarcation line, were likewise harassed with light weapons fire. Residential areas of Marinka, west of Donetsk city, witnessed heavy shelling from 82 mm mortars later in the evening. One Ukrainian serviceman was fatally wounded in the region of Zaitseve, north of Horlivka, in action against pro-Russian armoured fighting vehicles.
- 13 July: The ATO HQ reported that pro-Russian forces had opened fire on 29 occasions on Ukrainian positions (including on 6 occasions in Luhansk region, on 6 occasions in the outskirts of Donetsk city, and on 17 occasions in the region of Mariupol). The spokesman of the Ministry of Defence on issues related to ATO reported at noon that two Ukrainian soldiers were wounded in the Donbas region on 13 July. The press-centre of the ATO HQ reported in the evening that as of 7:30 pm pro-Russian forces had opened fire on Ukrainian positions on 13 occasions, no casualties were reported. Pro-Russian armoured fighting vehicles engaged Ukrainian forces at Shyrokyne, in the region of Mariupol, with the support of 120 mm mortar fire. Nearby Vodiane was hit by 82 mm mortar volleys, and light weapons were fired at Hnutove, Pavlopil, Chermalyk and Lebedinske. In the surroundings of Donetsk city, rebel forces opened fire on the stronghold of Avdiivka with small arms and rocket launchers. Small arms fire was reported at Krymske, in the northern section of the demarcation line.
- 14 July: The spokesman of the Ukrainian operational headquarters reported that pro-Russian troops had opened fire on 35 occasions on Ukrainian positions (including on 6 occasions in the outskirts of Donetsk city, on 13 occasions in the region of Mariupol, and on 16 occasions in Luhansk region). The spokesman of the Ministry of Defence on issues related to ATO reported at noon that one Ukrainian serviceman was killed and three others were wounded in action in the Donbas region on 14 July. The fatality occurred in the course of a skirmish between pro-Russian scouts and Ukrainian soldiers in the area of Bakhmutka road (at Novotoshkivske) that lasted until the first hours of 15 July. According to the information provided by the ATO press-centre in the evening, as of 6:00 pm pro-Russian forces had opened fire on positions of Ukrainian troops on 9 occasions, no casualties were reported. In the outskirts of Donetsk city and Horlivka, pro-Russian armoured fighting vehicles opened fire on Ukrainian redoubts at Luhanske, supported by small arms and rocket launchers. Heavy machine gun fire was reported at Butivka mining complex, while Krasnohorivka became under 82 mm and 120 mm mortar fire. In the region of Mariupol, rocket propelled grenades landed around Ukrainian positions at Hnutove, Pavlopil and Shyrokyne. In the northern sector of the demarcation line, rebel forces shelled Stary Aidar and Novotoshkivka with 82 mm and 120 mm mortars.
- 4 August: The ATO HQ reported in the morning that pro-Russian forces had opened fire on 38 occasions on Ukrainian positions (including on 15 occasions in the outskirts of Donetsk city, on 8 occasions in the region of Mariupol, and on 15 occasions in Luhansk region). The spokesman of the Ministry of Defence on issues related to ATO reported at noon that three Ukrainian soldiers were wounded in the Donbas region on 4 August. The press-centre of the ATO HQ reported in the evening that as of 6:00 pm pro-Russian forces had opened fire on Ukrainian positions on 8 occasions, one Ukrainian soldier was wounded. Rebel forces in the northern section of the demarcation line fired 82 mm mortars at Ukrainian positions near Novooleksandrivka and Donetz, while in the outskirts of Donetsk city, Avdiivka became the target of small arms, rocket launchers and mortars, while in the region of Mariupol, antitank rockets landed in Lebedinske Ukrainian forces returned fire. One Ukrainian serviceman was killed and five others were injured by the accidental explosion of ammunition during drills in the Kyiv region.
- 16 August: The ATO HQ reported that pro-Russian forces had opened fire on 35 occasions on Ukrainian positions (including on 21 occasions in the outskirts of Donetsk city, on 7 occasions in the region of Mariupol, and on 7 occasions in Luhansk region). The spokesman of the Ministry of Defence on issues related to ATO reported at noon that one Ukrainian serviceman was killed and four others were wounded and injured in the Donbas region on 16 August. The press-centre of the ATO HQ reported in the evening that as of 6:00 pm pro-Russian forces had opened fire on Ukrainian positions on 9 occasions. In the region of Mariupol, pro-Russian self-propelled 122 mm guns shelled Shyrokyne and Vodiane. Shyrokyne was also targeted by "Grad-P" single rocket launchers; five rockets landed around Ukrainian positions. In the outskirts of Donetsk city, rebel troops fired heavy machine guns and grenade launchers at the Ukrainian stronghold of Avdiivka. North of Horlivka, Ukrainian troops and International Red Cross personnel received rocket propelled grenade fire. In the northern sector of the demarcation line, 120 mm mortar volleys struck Novooleksandrivka, while antitank rockets landed in Krymske. Later in the evening pro-Russian tanks engaged Ukrainian redoubts at Starohnativka, in the region of Mariupol, supported by 152 mm artillery fire. In the outskirts of Donetsk city, armoured fighting vehicles opened fire on Ukrainian forces at Avdiivka. One Ukrainian serviceman was killed and another wounded by shelling at Avdiivka, another Ukrainian soldier was wounded at Starohnativka.
- 20 August: The ATO HQ reported that pro-Russian forces had opened fire on 47 occasions on Ukrainian positions (including on 18 occasions in the outskirts of Donetsk city, on 18 occasions in the region of Mariupol, and on 11 occasions in Luhansk region). The spokesman of the Ministry of Defence on issues related to ATO reported at noon that five Ukrainian servicemen were wounded and injured in the Donbas region on 20 August. The press-centre of the ATO HQ reported in the evening that as of 6:00 pm pro-Russian forces had opened fire on Ukrainian positions on 19 occasions; one Ukrainian serviceman was wounded at Popasna. In the outskirts of Donetsk city, Avdiivka was attacked twice with heavy machine guns and rocket launchers, while 82 mm and 120 mm mortar volleys landed in Pisky, which later came under fire from pro-Russian tanks. "Grad-P" single rocket launchers were fired at Ukrainian redoubts at Opytne. North of Horlivka, in the area of Svitlodarsk, at Luhanske, pro-Russian armoured fighting vehicles engaged Ukrainian armoured forces, which returned fire. In the region of Mariupol, the separatists shelled Chermalyk and Pavlopil with 82 mm mortars. In the northern section of the demarcation line, Ukrainian troops at Novozvanivka and Popasna received 82 mm and 120 mm mortar fire.
- 23 August : A renewed ceasefire was agreed between the warring parties in Minsk, to be implemented on 25 August in coincidence with the beginning of the school year.
- 26 August: The ATO HQ reported that pro-Russian forces had opened fire on 35 occasions on Ukrainian positions (including on 13 occasions in the outskirts of Donetsk city, on 21 occasions in the region of Mariupol, and on 1 occasion in Luhansk region). The spokesman of the Ministry of Defence on issues related to ATO, Oleksandr Motuzyanyk, reported at noon no casualties in the Donbas region on 26 August. Around Donetsk city and Mariupol, pro-Russian positions were engaged with 82 mm mortars, 120 mm mortars, 100 mm antitank guns, tanks, 122 mm and 152 mm self-propelled artillery- According to the information provided by the ATO press-centre in the evening, as of 6:00 pm pro-Russian forces had opened fire on positions of Ukrainian troops on 8 occasions. Rebel forces employed mostly small arms and antitank rockets to attack Ukrainian positions at Avdiivka and Zaitseve, in the outskirts of Donetsk city and Horlivka. Ukrainian troops returned fire. In the region of Mariupol, the same kind of weapons were used to harass Ukrainian redoubts at Starohnativka, Pavlopil, Vodiane and Shyrokyne. In the northern section of the demarcation line, small arms fire was reported at Stanytsia Luhanska.
- 3 September: The ATO HQ reported that pro-Russian forces had opened fire on 44 occasions on Ukrainian positions (including on 23 occasions in the outskirts of Donetsk city, on 19 occasions in the region of Mariupol, and on 2 occasions in Luhansk region). The spokesman of the Ministry of Defence on issues related to ATO reported at noon that one Ukrainian serviceman was wounded in the combat area on 3 September. Pro-Russian officials at Donetsk city reported 23 Ukrainian violations of the ceasefire in ten different locations using small arms, grenade launchers, 82 mm mortars, 120 mm mortars, armoured personnel carriers, armoured fighting vehicles, tanks and self-propelled guns. Seven areas around Donetsk city became the target of small arms, 82 mm mortars, 120 mm mortars, armoured personnel carriers and armoured fighting vehicles. Ukrainian tanks shelled two settlements in the region of Mariupol, with the support of small arms, 82 mm mortars, 120 mm mortars, armoured personnel carriers, armoured fighting vehicles and 152 mm self-propelled artillery. Ukrainian armoured fighting vehicles attacked pro-Russian positions at Zaitseve, north of Horlivka, supported by small arms and rocket launchers. According to the information provided by the ATO press-centre in the evening, as of 6:00 pm pro-Russian forces had opened fire on positions of Ukrainian troops on 17 occasions. In the surroundings of Donetsk city and Horlivka, rebel forces attacked Ukrainian redoubts at Zaitseve with small arms, heavy machine guns and 120 mm mortars. Pro-Russian armoured fighting vehicles opened fire on the same positions later in the evening. Small arms fire was reported at Avdiivka and Butivka mining complex. In the region of Mariupol, 120 mm mortar rounds landed in Talakivka and Hnutove, while heavy machine gun fire harassed Ukrainian troops at Pavlopil and Vodiane.
- 4 September: The spokesman of the Ukrainian operational headquarters, pro-Russian troops had opened fire on 36 occasions on Ukrainian positions. The spokesman of the Ministry of Defence on issues related to ATO reported at noon no casualties on 4 September. According to the information provided by the ATO press-centre in the evening, as of 6:00 pm pro-Russian forces had opened fire on positions of Ukrainian troops on 9 occasions. In the region of Mariupol, Ukrainian positions around Vodiane were fired at from heavy machine guns and rocket launchers. Antitank rockets also landed in Shyrokyne and Lebedinske later in the evening. In the surroundings of Donetsk city, Ukrainian forces at Avdiivka were harassed with small arms and heavy machine gun fire. Nearby Marinka was struck by antitank rockets, and under-barrell launched grenades hit Ukrainian redoubts at Nevelske. Small arms fire was reported at night in Malynove, Stanytsia Luhanska and Krymske, in the northern sector of the demarcation line.
- 9 September: The ATO HQ reported that pro-Russian forces had opened fire on 41 occasions on Ukrainian positions (including on 17 occasions in the outskirts of Donetsk city, on 23 occasions in the region of Mariupol, and on 1 occasion in Luhansk region). The spokesman of the Ministry of Defence on issues related to ATO reported at noon that one Ukrainian serviceman was killed and two others were wounded and injured on 9 September. Pro-Russian sources at Donetsk city reported 25 Ukrainian violations of the ceasefire in 11 different locations using small arms, grenade launchers, 82 mm mortars, 120 mm mortars, armoured personnel carriers, armoured fighting vehicles and heavy artillery. Local authorities reported that Ukrainian forces broke the ceasefire on five occasions within the boundaries of the self-proclaimed Luhansk People's Republic. The Ukrainian army employed small arms, automatic grenade launchers, 73 mm antitank recoilless guns and 82 mm mortars to attack pro-Russian positions at Lozove, Zholobok and Sokolniki. The press-centre of the ATO HQ reported in the evening that as of 6:00 pm pro-Russian forces had opened fire on positions of Ukrainian troops on 16 occasions — including on 6 occasions near Vodiane, the village that is situated about 10 km NE from the eastern border of Mariupol — the fire was returned on several occasions. The rebels used heavy machine guns and rocket launchers to attack Vodiane, while small arms fire was reported at nearby Shyrokyne. In the outskirts of Donetsk city and Horlivka, Marinka was shelled with grenade launchers and 82 mm mortars. The industrial area of Avdiivka and Zaitseve were hit by small arms fire and antitank rockets. In the northern sector of the demarcation line, 120 mm mortar volleys struck Lobacheve. One Ukrainian soldier was killed and another wounded near Krasnohorivka at around 10:00 pm.
- 10 September: According to the information provided by the spokesman of the Ukrainian operational headquarters, pro-Russian troops had opened fire on 51 occasions on Ukrainian positions (including on 22 occasions in the outskirts of Donetsk city, on 23 occasions in the region of Mariupol, and on 6 occasions in Luhansk region). The ATO press-centre reported by the evening, as of 6:00 pm pro-Russian forces had opened fire on positions of Ukrainian army on 20 occasions. Around Donetsk city and Horlivka, there were incidents involving small arms fire in Avdiivka. Pro-Russian armoured fighting vehicles engaged Ukrainian positions at Zaitseve, supported by heavy machine guns and rocket launchers. In the region of Mariupol, rebel forces employed heavy machine guns and antitank rockets to harass Ukrainian troops at Vodiane. Small arms fire was reported at Talakivka, Starohnativka and Lebedinske. In the northern section of the demarcation line, 82 mm mortar rounds landed in Novotoshkivke.

== October–December ==
- 11 October: The ATO HQ reported in the morning that pro-Russian forces had opened fire on 41 occasions on Ukrainian positions the previous day (including on 22 occasions in the outskirts of Donetsk city, on 14 occasions in the region of Mariupol, and on 5 occasions in Luhansk region); the fire was returned on 28 occasions. The spokesman of the Ministry of Defence on issues related to ATO reported at noon that one Ukrainian serviceman was wounded in the Donbas region on 11 October. Around Donetsk city, Ukrainian forces shelled Kruta Balka, Yasinuvata, Yakovliivka, Mineralne, Zhabicheve, Dokuchaievsk, Olenivka and Petrovsky district with 82 mm mortars, 120 mm mortars and armoured fighting vehicles. Pro-Russian positions also received small arms and heavy machine gun fire. In the region of Mariupol, BM-21 "Grad" multiple rocket launchers were fired at Bezimenne and 82 mm mortars and Leninske. Armoured fighting vehicles opened fire on pro-Russian troops at Pikuzy, Leninske and Dzerzhinsky supported by small arms and grenade launchers. In the surroundings of Horlivka, pro-Russian positions at Zaitseve were hit by small arms fire and antitank rockets. One pro-Russian soldier was killed. According to local sources, Ukrainian forces broke the ceasefire five times within the borders of the self-styled Luhansk People's Republic. The Ukrainian military employed small arms, heavy machine guns, automatic grenade launchers, 82 mm mortars, 120 mm mortars and BMP-1 vehicles to engage pro-Russian positions at Prishib, Kalynivka, Kalynove, Lohvynove, Sentianivka and Znamyanka. The press-centre of the ATO HQ reported in the evening that as of 6:00 pm pro-Russian troops had opened fire on Ukrainian troops on 12 occasions, the fire was returned on 8 occasions; no casualties were reported. In the outskirts of Donetsk city and Horlivk rebel forces opened fire on Ukrainian forces at Avdiivka with heavy machine guns and rocket launchers. Small arms fire was reported at Pisky, Nevelske and Luhanske. In the region of Mariupol, heavy machine guns and grenade launchers were fired at Ukrainian positions near Talakivka and Shyrokyne. Later in the night, pro-Russian tanks engaged Ukrainian redoubts at Krymske, in the northern sector of the demarcation line, supported by small arms, rocket launchers and mortars. One Ukrainian soldier was wounded by a bullet.
- 16 October: The spokesman of the Ukrainian operational headquarters reported that pro-Russian troops had opened fire on 36 occasions on Ukrainian positions on 16 October (including on 20 occasions in the outskirts of Donetsk city, on 11 occasions in the region of Mariupol, and on 5 occasions in Luhansk region; the fire was returned on 28 occasions. The spokesman of the Ministry of Defence on issues related to ATO reported at noon that two Ukrainian servicemen were killed and two others wounded in the Donbas region on 16 October. Ukrainian tanks engaged pro-Russian forces in ten different areas around Donetsk city supported by mortar fire. The positions also became the target of small arms, heavy machine guns, armoured personnel carriers and armoured fighting vehicles. Most incidents occurred at Spartak, Yasinuvata, Oleksandrivka, Kruta Balka and Donetsk airport. In the region of Mariupol, armoured personnel carriers and armoured fighting vehicles opened fire on pro-Russian redoubts at Pikuzy, Zayichenko and Leninske. According to the information provided by the ATO press-centre in the evening, as of 6:00 pm pro-Russian forces had opened fire on positions of Ukrainian troops on 12 occasions. In the outskirts of Donetsk city and Horlivka, Ukrainian forces at Avdiivka, Kamianka and Butivka mining complex were harassed with small arms and heavy machine gun fire. Artemove was hit twice by 82 mm mortar fire. In the region of Mariupol, antitank rockets landed in Starohnativka, while small arms fire was reported at Vodiane and Pavlopil. Later in the evening, armoured fighting vehicles opened fire on Ukrainian positions at Novotroitske, and 120 mm mortar rounds struck Pavlopil. In the northern sector of the demarcation line, heavy machine gun fire was recorded near Novooleksandrivka, while at dusk infantry weapons and rocket launchers were fired at Valuiske and Stanytsia Luhanska. One Ukrainian serviceman was killed at Kamianka at around 6:00 pm, another was killed by explosion of unidentified explosive device at Nevelske, one Ukrainian soldier was wounded at Pavlopil at around 6:00 pm, another at Butivka mining complex in the evening. A female civilian was wounded by shelling in Toretsk at around 2:00 pm.
- 17 October: The ATO HQ reported in the morning that pro-Russian forces had opened fire on 44 occasions on Ukrainian positions the previous day (including on 29 occasions in the outskirts of Donetsk city, on 12 occasions in the region of Mariupol, and on 3 occasions in Luhansk region; the fire was returned on 38 occasions. The spokesman of the Ministry of Defence on issues related to ATO confirmed at noon that two Ukrainian servicemen were killed and four others wounded in the Donbas region on 17 October. In the surroundings of Donetsk city, pro-Russian forces in 12 areas came under attack by small arms, rocket launchers, 82 mm mortars, 120 mm mortars, armoured fighting vehicles and tanks. In the region of Mariupol, Leninske, Sosnovske and Verhnioshyrokivske were attacked by small arms fire, antitank rockets, 82 mm mortars, 120 mm mortar rounds and armoured fighting vehicles. In the outskirts of Horlivka, Ukrainian forces used small arms and rocket launchers to harass pro-Russian positions at Verkhnyotoretske, Zaitseve and Mayorsk checkpoint. Zaitseve also came under 82 mm mortar fire. The press-centre of the ATO HQ reported in the evening that as of 6:00 pm pro-Russian troops had opened fire on Ukrainian troops on 19 occasions. In the outskirts of Donetsk city and Horlivka, rebel troops fired heavy machine guns and rocket launchers at Avdiivka, Novoselivka, Butivka mining complex, Troitske and Mayorsk. Small arms fire was reported at Kamianka and Pisky, while 82 mm mortar rounds landed in Zaitseve and Marinka, which also became the target of small arms and grenade launchers. In the region of Mariupol, Lebedinske and Hnutove were hit by 82 mm and 120 mm mortar fire respectively. In the northern section of the demarcation line, pro-Russian armoured fighting vehicles engaged Ukrainian redoubts at Novooleksandrivka supported by 82 mm mortar fire. Ukrainian troops at Krymske and Popasna came under small arms fire. One Ukrainian serviceman was killed at Marinka at around 1:00 am, another Ukrainian soldier was killed at Zaitseve at around 6:00 pm, two Ukrainian servicemen were wounded at Marinka in the evening, two were injured by explosion of an IED.
- 18 October: According to the information provided by the spokesman of the Ukrainian operational headquarters in the morning, pro-Russian troops had opened fire on 53 occasions on Ukrainian positions on 18 October (including on 32 occasions in the outskirts of Donetsk city, on 3 occasions in the region of Mariupol, and on 17 occasions in Luhansk region); the fire was returned on 31 occasions. The spokesman of the Ministry of Defence on issues related to ATO confirmed at noon that three Ukrainian servicemen were wounded in the Donbas region on 18 October. In the outskirts of Donetsk city, Ukrainian forces attacked pro-Russian positions in 14 areas with small arms, rocket launchers, 82 mm mortars, 120 mm mortars, armoured fighting vehicles, tanks and 152 mm self-propelled guns. In the region of Mariupol, armoured fighting vehicles opened fire on Verhnioshyrokivske supported by small arms, grenade launchers and 82 mm mortars. In the area of Horlivka, pro-Russian forces at Nyzhne Novhorodske, Zaitseve and Zheleznaya Balka became the target of small arms fire and rocket propelled grenades. The ATO press-centre reported in the evening, as of 6:00 pm, that pro-Russian forces had opened fire on positions of Ukrainian troops on 22 occasions, including on 18 occasions in the outskirts of Donetsk city and Horlivka. Pro-Russian armoured fighting vehicles opened fire on Ukrainian positions at Pisky, supported by 120 mm mortars. Antitank rockets landed meanwhile in Kamianka, Mayorsk and Luhanske, and 82 mm mortar volleys in Avdiivka. Troitske was shelled with 120 mm mortars. In the region of Mariupol, 82 mm mortar rounds hit Hnutove, while Ukrainian troops at Starohnativka where harassed with machine gun fire. In the northern section of the demarcation line, 82 mm mortar rounds hit Novotoshkivke and Novozvanivka. Rebel troops also fired automatic grenade launchers at Troitske, Novooleksandrivka and Novozvanivka, and 120 mm mortars at Krymske and Popasna. One Ukrainian soldier was wounded at Butivka mining complex, another was wounded at Pisky at around 6:00 pm, and one Ukrainian serviceman was injured by the blast of an explosive device.,
- 3 November: The spokesman of the Ukrainian operational headquarters in the morning, pro-Russian troops had opened fire on 29 occasions on Ukrainian positions the previous day (including on 13 occasions in the outskirts of Donetsk city, on 6 occasions in the region of Mariupol, and on 10 occasions in Luhansk region); the fire was returned on 17 occasions. The spokesman of the Ministry of Defence on issues related to ATO confirmed at noon that three Ukrainian servicemen were wounded in the Donbas region on 3 November. The outskirts of Donetsk city were shelled by 82 mm mortars, 120 mm mortars (436 rounds), tanks (55 rounds), 122 mm and 152 mm self-propelled guns (24 rounds). Ukrainian armoured fighting vehicles were active in the regions of Mariupol and Horlivka with the support of small arms and rocket launchers. According to the information provided by the ATO press-centre in the evening, as of 6:00 pm pro-Russian forces had opened fire on positions of Ukrainian troops on 13 occasions, the fire was returned on 8 occasions. In the outskirts of Donetsk city and Horlivka, Ukrainian positions at Avdiivka, Kamianka, Pisky, Zaitseve and Kamianka were hit by small arms fire and antitank rockets. In the region of Mariupol, pro-Russian armoured fighting vehicles opened fire on Ukrainian forces defending Vodiane. In the northern sector of the demarcation line, Krymske was shelled with automatic grenade launchers and 82 mm mortars. Small arms fire was reported meanwhile in Troitske. One Ukrainian soldier was wounded near Kamianka at around noon, another Ukrainian serviceman was wounded at Avdiivka at around 7:00 pm, and one soldier was wounded near Novooleksandrivka.
- 10 November: The ATO HQ reported in the morning that pro-Russian forces had opened fire on 33 occasions on Ukrainian positions the previous day (including on 16 occasions in the outskirts of Donetsk city and in the region of Mariupol, and on 17 occasions in Luhansk region); the fire was returned on 24 occasions. The spokesman of the Ministry of Defence on issues related to ATO reported at noon that two Ukrainian servicemen were wounded on 10 November, at Butyvka mining complex and at Vodiane. Pro-Russian forces at 14 locations near Donetsk city became the target of small arms, rocket launchers, 82 mm mortars, 120 mm mortars, antitank guided missiles and 122 mm self-propelled guns. In the region of Mariupol, Pikuzy came under 152 mm artillery fire, while other three settlements were hit by 82 mm and 120 mm mortar rounds. In the surroundings of Horlivka, Ukrainian troops fired small arms and grenade launchers at Zaitseve and Izotove coal mine. The press-centre of the ATO HQ reported in the evening that as of 6:00 pm pro-Russian forces had opened fire on Ukrainian positions on 16 occasions. Pro-Russian tanks engaged Ukrainian redoubts around Pisky, in the outskirts of Donetsk city. Ukrainian forces in the same area were targeted by 120 mm mortars, antiaircraft guns and armoured fighting vehicles. Nearby Avdiivka was also struck by 120 mm mortar volleys. One Ukrainian soldier was wounded. In the region of Mariupol, rebel troops fired small arms, heavy machine guns and rocket launchers at Hnutove and Vodiane. In the northern section of the demarcation line, the same weapons were used to harass Ukrainian troops at Krymske and Luhanske. Later in the evening another Ukrainian serviceman was wounded in the area of Mariupol.
- 12 November: The ATO HQ reported in the morning that pro-Russian forces had opened fire on 33 occasions on Ukrainian positions the previous day (including on 18 occasions in Donetsk region and on 15 occasions in Luhansk region); the fire was returned on 19 occasions. The spokesman of the Ministry of Defence on issues related to ATO reported at noon no casualties in the Donbas region on 12 November. Around Donetsk city, pro-Russian troops in ten areas became the target of small arms, grenade launchers, 82 mm and 120 mm mortars. In the region of Mariupol, three settlements were shelled with 82 mm and 120 mm mortars. In the outskirts of Horlivka, Ozeryanivka, Myhailivske and Zaitseve were hit by small arms fire and antitank rockets. The press-centre of the ATO HQ reported in the evening that as of 6:00 pm pro-Russian troops had opened fire on Ukrainian troops on 23 occasions, no casualties were reported. In the outskirts of Donetsk city, Ukrainian troops at Avdiivka, Marinka and Butyvka mining complex came under fire from pro-Russian infantry. In the region of Mariupol, 82 mm and 120 mm mortar rounds landed in Hnutove, while Vodiane was attacked by armoured fighting vehicles supported by heavy machine guns and rocket launchers. In the northern section of the demarcation line, pro-Russian armoured fighting vehicles engaged Ukrainian positions at Luhanske with the support of small arms, grenade launchers, 82 mm mortars and 120 mm mortars. Krymske and Katerinivka were also hit by small arms fire, antitank rockets and 82 mm mortar rounds. Heavy machine gun fire was reported at Valuiske.
- 13 November: The spokesman of the Ukrainian operational headquarters in the morning, pro-Russian troops had opened fire on 33 occasions on Ukrainian positions the previous day (including on 16 occasions in Donetsk and on 17 occasions in Luhansk region); the fire was returned on 23 occasions. The spokesman of the Ministry of Defence on issues related to ATO confirmed at noon that two Ukrainian servicemen were wounded in the Donbas region on 13 November. Eleven settlements around Donetsk city were struck by small arms fire, antitank rockets, 82 mm mortars, 120 mm mortars and artillery. In the region of Mariupol, five areas were shelled with 82 mm and 120 mm mortars, while small arms fire and rocket launchers hit pro-Russian positions in three locations near Horlivka. According to the information provided by the ATO press-centre in the evening, as of 6:00 pm pro-Russian forces had opened fire on positions of Ukrainian troops on 14 occasions, two Ukrainian soldiers were wounded; one at Marinka, another at Novotroitske. In the area around Donetsk city, antitank rockets and small arms fire hit Avdiivka. Small arms fire was also reported at Pisky and Marinka came under 82 mm mortar fire. In the region of Mariupol, the rebels used 82 mm and 120 mm mortars to shell Pavlopil and Vodiane. Small arms and rocket launchers were fired at Pavlopil, Shyrokyne, Novotroitske, and Vodiane. In the northern sector of the demarcation line, Luhanske came under small arms and 120 mm mortar fire. The rebels also shelled Lopaskine and Troitske with 82 mm mortars. Later in the evening, pro-Russian armoured fighting vehicles engaged Ukrainian positions near Troitske supported by small arms and grenade launchers. Small arms fire was also reported at Krymske, while Zaitseve was struck by small arms fire, heavy machine gun fire and antitank rockets.
- 22 November: Russian media reported that Luhansk People's Republic (LNR) prime minister Igor Plotnitsky was overthrown by former police chief Igor Kornet and purportedly fled to Russia. Masked armed men, supported by military vehicles, occupied downtown Luhansk and stormed the office of LNR chief prosecutor, Vitaly Podobry, and de facto military prosecutor, Sergei Razno. Pro-Russian press announced on 24 November that Plotnitsky had resigned "on health grounds" and was replaced by Leonid Pasechnik.
- 3 December: According to the information provided by the spokesman of the Ukrainian operational headquarters in the morning, pro-Russian troops had opened fire on 38 occasions on Ukrainian positions the previous day (including on 15 occasions in Donetsk and on 23 occasions in Luhansk region); the fire was returned on 22 occasions. The spokesman of the Ministry of Defence on issues related to ATO reported at noon that one Ukrainian serviceman was killed and four were wounded in the Donbas region on 3 December. The ATO press-centre reported in the evening, as of 6:00 pm pro-Russian forces had opened fire on positions of Ukrainian troops 19 times. Pro-Russian tanks engaged Ukrainian redoubts around Avdiivka, in the surroundings of Donetsk. Avdiivka, along with nearby Verkhnyotoretske and Marinka, also became the target of small arms, heavy machine guns, rocket launchers and 82 mm mortars. In the region of Mariupol, Shyrokyne came under 120 mm mortar fire, while Lebedinske and Pavlopil were shelled with 82 mm mortars. Rebel forces fired small arms, heavy machine guns and grenade launchers at Vodiane, Pavlopil and Talakivka. One Ukrainian serviceman was killed and another wounded by shelling at Shyrokyne, two soldiers were wounded at Troitske, one was wounded near Vodiane. Sniper fire was reported at Novotroitske. The Ukrainian military returned fire on several occasions. In the northern section of the demarcation line, Troitske and Luhanske were shelled with 120 mm mortars, while 82 mm mortars hit Zolote. Ukrainian forces at Zhovte, Zaitseve, Zolote, Krymske, Luhanske, Malynove, Novhorodske, Novoluhanske, Novooleksandrivka and Troitske were attacked with small arms, heavy machine guns, rocket launchers and armoured fighting vehicles. Ukrainian forces fired back using small arms, heavy machine guns and armoured fighting vehicles.
- 4 December: A 5-hour clash between pro-Russian scouts and Ukrainian army — that started in the early hours of 4 December — took place at Luhanske. Russian media denounced that a USAF RQ-4 Global Hawk strategic drone performed a surveillance sortie over the demarcation line, at an altitude of 16,700 meters. There were at least three previous flights since 14 May.
- 9 December: The spokesman of the Ukrainian operational headquarters in the morning, pro-Russian troops had opened fire on 39 occasions on Ukrainian positions the previous day (including on 11 occasions in Donetsk and on 28 occasions in Luhansk region); the fire was returned on 10 occasions. The spokesman of the Ministry of Defence on issues related to ATO reported at noon no casualties in the Donbas region on 9 December. Pro-Russian officials at Donetsk city recorded 43 Ukrainian violations of the ceasefire in 20 locations using small arms, grenade launchers, 82 mm mortars, 120 mm mortars, antiaircraft guns, armoured personnel carriers, armoured fighting vehicles and heavy artillery. According to local sources, the Ukrainian military broke the ceasefire 11 times within the borders of the self-styled Luhansk People's Republic. The Ukrainian military employed small arms, heavy machine guns, 82 mm mortars, 120 mm mortars and BMP-1 vehicles to engage pro-Russian positions at Nyzhne Lozove, Krasny Lyman, Kalynove and Kalynivka. According to the information provided by the ATO press-centre in the evening, as of 6:00 pm pro-Russian forces had opened fire on positions of Ukrainian troops on 14 occasions. In the outskirts of Donetsk city, 82 mm mortar rounds landed in Marinka, Pisky and Butivka mining complex. Small arms fire harassed Ukrainian troops south of Avdiivka. In the region of Mariupol, pro-Russian armoured fighting vehicles engaged Ukrainian forces at Vodiana and Talakivka, supported by grenade launchers. In the northern section of the demarcation line, Ukrainian positions at Troitske and Krymske became the target of small arms, antiaircraft guns, armoured fighting vehicles and 120 mm mortars. Antitank rockets and 82 mm mortar rounds struck Luhanske and Popasna. Armoured fighting vehicles opened fire on Zaitseve, while heavy machine gun fire harassed Ukrainian troops at Novooleksandrivka and Svitlodarsk.
- 10 December: The ATO HQ reported in the morning that pro-Russian forces had opened fire on 35 occasions on Ukrainian positions the previous day (including on 15 occasions in Donetsk region and on 20 occasions in Luhansk region); the fire was returned on 22 occasions. The spokesman of the Ministry of Defence on issues related to ATO reported at noon that two Ukrainian Ukrainian servicemen were wounded and three others were injured in the Donbas region on 10 December. The press-centre of the ATO HQ reported in the evening that as of 6:00 pm pro-Russian troops had opened fire on Ukrainian troops on 8 occasions, exclusively in Donetsk region. In the surroundings of Donetsk city, 82 mm mortars rounds struck Butivka mining complex and Pisky. Ukrainian troops at Avdiivka were harassed with small arms fire. In the region of Mariupol, Vodiane and Talakivka came under attack from rocket launchers and armoured fighting vehicles. In the northern section of the demarcation line, Krymske and Luhanske were shelled with 82 mm and 120 mm mortars. Pro-Russian armoured fighting vehicles engaged Ukrainian positions at Troitske supported by antiaircraft guns and 120 mm mortars. Popasna, meanwhile, was hit by 82 mm mortar fire. Two Ukrainian servicemen were wounded at Avdiivka, three soldiers suffered concussions at Pisky and Lozove.
- 19 December: The spokesman of the Ukrainian operational headquarters in the morning, pro-Russian troops had opened fire on 32 occasions on Ukrainian positions the previous day (including on 22 occasions in Donetsk and on 10 occasions in Luhansk region); the fire was returned on 23 occasions. The spokesman of the Ministry of Defence on issues related to ATO confirmed at noon that two Ukrainian servicemen were killed and another six were wounded and injured in the Donbas region on 19 December. According to the information provided by the ATO press-centre in the evening, as of 6:00 pm pro-Russian forces had opened fire on positions of Ukrainian troops on 21 occasions, the fire was returned on 14 occasions. Rebel forces from Horlivka fired a 20-rocket barrage on Ukrainian positions at Zaitseve, in the northern section of the demarcation line, from BM-21 "Grad" multiple launchers. Earlier, armoured fighting vehicles attacked the area with the support of grenade launchers. Troitske, Novotoshkivske, Novooleksandrivka and Novoluhanske became the target of infantry weapons and 120 mm mortars. Ukrainian troops anear Stanytsia Luhanska were harassed with small arms fire, while 120 mm mortar rounds landed in Maiske. In the area of Donetsk city, 82 mm and 120 mm mortar rounds hit Pisky and Kamyanka, and antitank rockets struck Avdiivka. Butivka mining complex was shelled with rocket launchers and 82 mm mortars. Small arms fire was reported at Verkhnyotoretske. In the region of Mariupol, Lebedinske, Novotroitske and Pavlopil came under rocket propelled grenade and 82 mm mortar fire. Pro-Russian armoured fighting vehicles engaged Ukrainian redoubts at Hnutove, while small arms fire was reported at Starohnativka. Two Ukrainian servicemen were killed, five were wounded, and one Ukrainian soldier was injured.
