= Novobakhmutivka, Soloviove Village Council =

Village in Ukraine

Novobakhmutivka Новобахмутівка
- Village
- Interactive map of Novobakhmutivka
- Location of Novobakhmutivka Novobakhmutivka (Ukraine)
- Coordinates: 48°13′38″N 37°37′9″E
- Country: Ukraine
- Oblast: Donetsk Oblast
- Raion: Pokrovsk Raion
- Hromada: Ocheretyne settlement hromada
- Elevation: 142 m (466 ft)

Population (2001)
  - Total: 191
- Time zone: UTC+2 (EET)
  - Summer (DST): UTC+3 (EEST)
- Postal code: 86032
- Area code: +380 6236

Novobakhmutivka (Ukrainian: Новобахмутівка) is a village in Ocheretyne settlement hromada, Pokrovsk Raion, Donetsk Oblast, Ukraine. The village was under the Soloviove Village Council prior to the formation of the hromada in 2020. As of 2001, the population was 191 people.

== Overview ==
The distance from the district centre is approximately 28 km, accessibly via a local road.

== History ==
=== Russo-Ukrainian War ===
Russian invasion of Ukraine

On 28 April 2024, during the Russian invasion of Ukraine, Russian forces claimed that they had captured the village, which likely happened during the night of 24–25 April. The capture was confirmed by DeepStateMap.Live.

== Demographics ==
According to 2001 census data, the population of the village was 191 people, with 84.82% indicating Ukrainian as their native language and 13.09% indicating Russian.
