= Sokil, Donetsk Oblast =

Sokil Сокіл
- Village
- Interactive map of Sokil
- Location of Sokil within Ukraine Sokil (Donetsk Oblast)
- Coordinates: 48°13′54″N 37°33′12″E
- Country: Ukraine
- Oblast: Donetsk Oblast
- Raion: Pokrovsk Raion
- Hromada: Ocheretyne settlement hromada
- Elevation: 201 m (659 ft)

Population (2001 census)
  - Total: 66
- Time zone: UTC+2 (EET)
  - Summer (DST): UTC+3 (EEST)
- Postal code: 86024
- Area code: +380 6236

Sokil (Ukrainian: Сокіл; Russian: Сокол) is a village in Ocheretyne settlement hromada, Pokrovsk Raion, Donetsk Oblast, Ukraine. The population was 66 in the 2001 census.

== History ==
=== Russo-Ukrainian War ===
==== Russian invasion of Ukraine ====
As part of the Russian invasion of Ukraine, the village was fought over between Russia and Ukraine in June 2024. It was claimed captured later that month by the Russian Ministry of Defense on 29 June and confirmed captured in early July.

== Demographics ==
According to the 2001 census, the population of the village was 66, of which 89.39% stated their native language to be Ukrainian and 10.61% stated their native language to be Russian.
