= Soloviove =

Soloviove may refer to:

- Soloviove, Donetsk Oblast
- Soloviove, Sumy Oblast
