= Lozove, Pokrovsk Raion, Donetsk Oblast =

Lozove Лозове
- Rural settlement
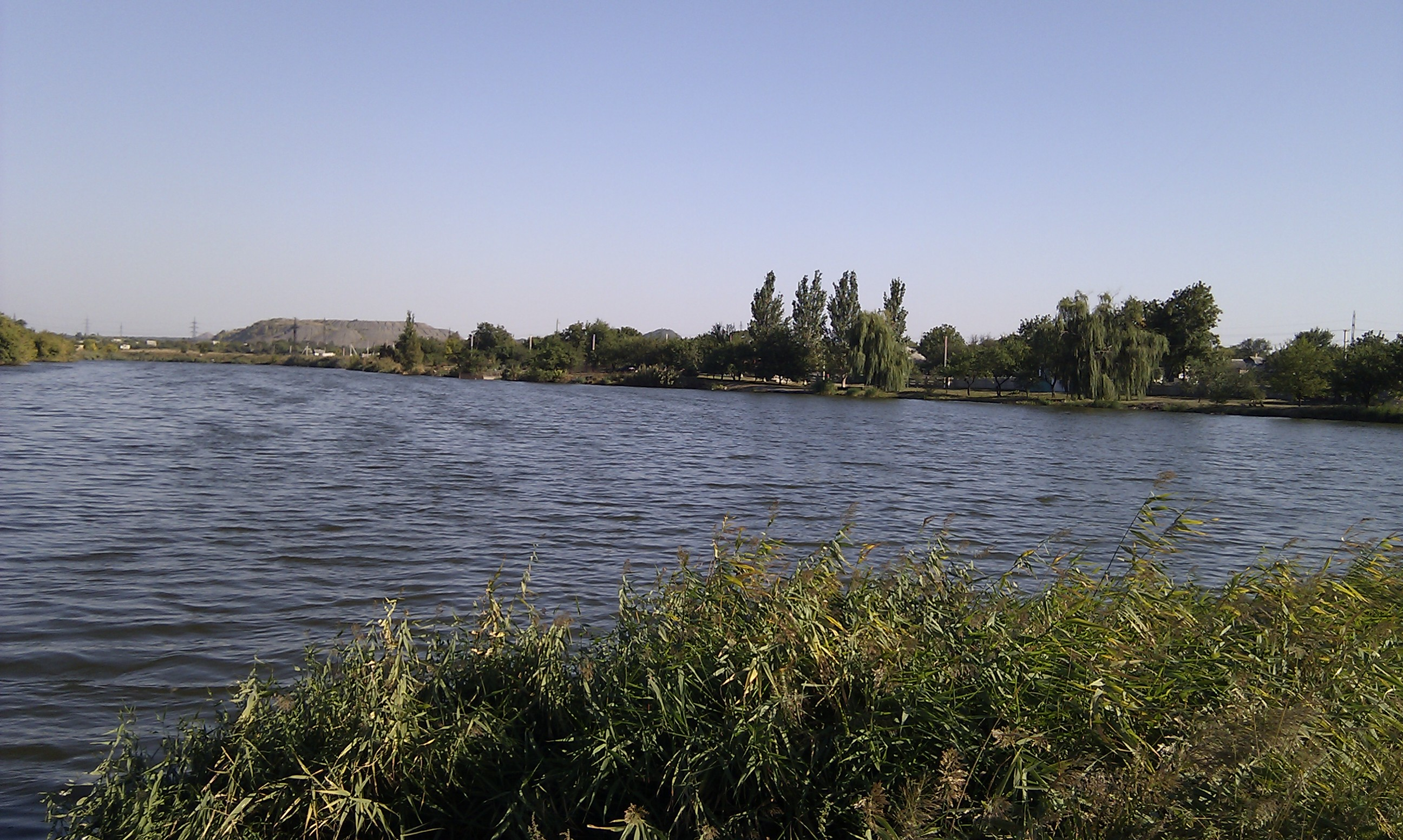
- Interactive map of Lozove
- Location of Lozove within Ukraine
- Coordinates: 48.005°N 37.643889°E
- Country: Ukraine
- Oblast: Donetsk Oblast
- District: Pokrovsk Raion
- Hromada: Ocheretyne settlement hromada
- Elevation: 182 m (597 ft)

Population (2001 census)
  - Total: 366
- Time zone: UTC+2 (EET)
  - Summer (DST): UTC+3 (EEST)
- Postal code: 83020
- Area code: +380 6236

Lozove (Ukrainian: Лозове; Russian: Лозовое) is a rural settlement in Pokrovsk Raion, Donetsk Oblast, eastern Ukraine, at 15 km (9.3 mi) W from the centre of Donetsk city.

The settlement was taken under control of pro-Russian forces during the War in Donbass, that started in 2014.

== Demographics ==
The settlement had 366 inhabitants in 2001. Native language as of the Ukrainian Census of 2001:

- Ukrainian — 62.84%
- Russian — 35.52%
- Bulgarian — 0.82%
- Armenian — 0.27%
