= Blahodatne, Pokrovsk Raion, Donetsk Oblast =

Urban locality in Donetsk Oblast, Ukraine

Blahodatne Благодатне
- Rural settlement
- Location of Blahodatne in Donetsk Oblast#Location of Blahodatne in Ukraine Blahodatne (Ukraine)
- Coordinates: 48°12′29″N 37°26′40″E
- Country: Ukraine
- Oblast: Donetsk Oblast
- Raion: Pokrovsk Raion
- Hromada: Ocheretyne settlement hromada
- Elevation: 188 m (617 ft)

Population (2022)
  - Total: 1,274
- Time zone: UTC+2
  - Summer (DST): UTC+3
- Postal code: 86023
- Area code: +380 6236

Blahodatne (Ukrainian: Благодатне), formerly known as Zhelanne (Ukrainian: Желанне; Russian: Желание), is a rural settlement in Ocheretyne settlement hromada, Pokrovsk Raion, Donetsk Oblast, eastern Ukraine. In 2022, the population was estimated to be 1,274, but had reduced to an estimated 100 by 2024 during the Russian invasion of Ukraine. In 2024 the Verkhovna Rada renamed the village as a part of the derussification campaign.

== History ==
On 14 August 2024, during the Pokrovsk offensive of the Russo-Ukrainian War, the village was captured by Russia.
