= Ocheretyne settlement hromada =

Ocheretyne settlement hromada Очеретинська селищна громада
- Hromada
- Interactive map of Ocheretyne settlement hromada
- Country: Ukraine
- Oblast: Donetsk Oblast
- Raion: Pokrovsk Raion

Area
  - Total: 726.0 km^{2} (280.3 sq mi)

Population (2020)
  - Total: 21,399
  - Density: 29.48/km^{2} (76.34/sq mi)
- Settlements: 40
- Rural settlements: 9
- Villages: 27
- Towns: 4

Ocheretyne settlement hromada (Ukrainian: Очеретинська селищна громада) is a hromada of Ukraine, located in Pokrovsk Raion, Donetsk Oblast. Its administrative center is the town of Ocheretyne.

It has an area of 726.0 square kilometres (280.3 mi^{2}) and had a population of 21,399 in 2020. In 2023, the population had decreased from the Russian invasion of Ukraine to 2,670.

The hromada includes 40 rural populated places: 13 rural settlements (Betmanove, Blahodatne, Voskhod, Kamianka, Lastochkyne, Lozove, Nevelske, Pisky, Pivnichne, Stepove, Ocheretyne, Verkhniotoretske, and Keramik), 27 villages:

- Arkhanhelske
- Avdiivske
- Berdychi
- Vasylivka
- Vesele
- Vodiane
- Mezhove
- Netailove
- Novobakhmutivka, former Novobakhmutivka Village Council
- Novobakhmutivka, former Soloviove Village Council
- Novokalynove
- Novopokrovske
- Novoselivka
- Novoselivka Druha
- Novoselivka Persha
- Oleksandropil
- Orlivka
- Panteleimonivka
- Semenivka
- Skuchne
- Sokil
- Soloviove
- Tonenke
- Troitske
- Umanske
- Yasnobrodivka
- Yasnohorivka

== See also ==
- List of hromadas of Ukraine
