= Soniachne, Pokrovsk Raion, Donetsk Oblast =

Soniachne Сонячне
- Village
- Interactive map of Soniachne
- Location of Soniachne within Ukraine Soniachne (Ukraine)
- Coordinates: 48°09′40″N 37°29′36″E
- Country: Ukraine
- Oblast: Donetsk Oblast
- Raion: Pokrovsk Raion
- Hromada: Ocheretyne settlement hromada
- Elevation: 174 m (571 ft)

Population (2001 census)
  - Total: 14
- Time zone: UTC+2 (EET)
  - Summer (DST): UTC+3 (EEST)
- Postal code: 86024
- Area code: +380 6236
- KATOTTH: UA14160190250060455

Soniachne (Ukrainian: Сонячне), formerly known as Skuchne (Ukrainian: Скучне; Russian: Скучное), is a village in Ocheretyne settlement hromada, Pokrovsk Raion, Donetsk Oblast, Ukraine. It is located 28.28 kilometres (17.57 mi) northwest by north (NWbN) from the centre of Donetsk city.

== Geography ==
The village lies on the right bank of the Vovcha river. The absolute height is 145 metres above sea level.

== History ==
=== Russian invasion of Ukraine ===
The settlement came under attack of Russian forces during the full-scale Russian invasion of Ukraine in August 2024, and was captured around 19 August.

In 2024 the Verkhovna Rada renamed the village as a part of the derussification campaign.

== Demographics ==
As of the 2001 Ukrainian census, the settlement had 14 inhabitants, whose native languages were 78.57% Ukrainian and 21.43% Russian.
