= Novopokrovske =

Village in Donetsk Oblast, Ukraine

Novopokrovske Новопокровське
- Village
- Interactive map of Novopokrovske
- Location of Novopokrovske within Ukraine Novopokrovske (Donetsk Oblast)
- Coordinates: 48.204167°N 37.569722°E
- Country: Ukraine
- Oblast Region: Donetsk Oblast
- Raion: Pokrovsk Raion
- Hromada: Ocheretyne settlement hromada
- Elevation: 192 m (630 ft)

Population (2001 census)
  - Total: 64
- Time zone: UTC+2 (EET)
  - Summer (DST): UTC+3 (EEST)
- Postal code: 86024
- Area code: +380 6236

Novopokrovske (Ukrainian: Новопокровське; Russian: Новопокровское) is a village in Ocheretyne settlement hromada, Pokrovsk Raion, Donetsk Oblast, Ukraine. It is located 26.97 kilometres (16.76 mi) northwest by west (NWbW) of the centre of Donetsk city.

== History ==
=== Russian invasion ===
The settlement came under attack by Russian forces during the Russian invasion of Ukraine in June 2024, and was captured between 12–13 June.

== Demographics ==
As of the 2001 Ukrainian census, the settlement had 64 inhabitants, whose native languages were 73.44% Ukrainian and 26.56% Russian.
