= Verkhnotoretske =

Verkhnotoretske Верхньоторецьке
- Rural settlement
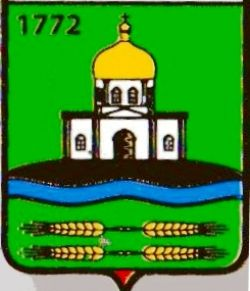
- Coat of arms
- Interactive map of Verkhnotoretske
- Location of Verkhnotoretske within Ukraine Verkhnotoretske (Ukraine)
- Coordinates: 48°12′41″N 37°53′35″E
- Country: Ukraine
- Oblast: Donetsk Oblast
- Raion: Pokrovsk Raion
- Hromada: Ocheretyne settlement hromada
- Founded: 1772

Area
  - Total: 1.825 km^{2} (0.705 sq mi)
- Elevation: 132 m (433 ft)

Population (2022)
  - Total: 2,819
  - Density: 1,545/km^{2} (4,001/sq mi)
- Time zone: UTC+2 (EET)
  - Summer (DST): UTC+3 (EEST)
- Postal code: 86040
- Area code: +380 6236

Verkhnotoretske (Ukrainian: Верхньоторецьке; Russian: Верхнеторецкое) is a rural settlement in Pokrovsk Raion, Donetsk Oblast, eastern Ukraine. It was formerly part of Yasynuvata Raion until the raion was abolished in 2020, and it is located 24.2 kilometres (15.0 mi) north-northwest from Donetsk city. Population: 2,819 (2022 estimate).

During the war in Donbas, that started in mid-April 2014, the separation line between the warring parties has been located in the vicinity of the settlement. The conflict has brought along both civilian and military casualties.
