= Yasnobrodivka =

Yasnobrodivka Яснобродівка
- Village
- Yasnobrodivka shown within Ukraine Yasnobrodivka shown within Donetsk
- Coordinates: 48°8′9″N 37°32′46″E
- Country: Ukraine
- Oblast: Donetsk Oblast
- Raion: Pokrovsk Raion
- Hromada: Ocheretyne settlement hromada
- Elevation: 164 m (538 ft)

Population (2001)
  - Total: 70
- Postal code: 86050
- Area code: +380 6236

Yasnobrodivka (Ukrainian: Яснобродівка Russian: Яснобродовка) is a village in Ocheretyne settlement hromada, Pokrovsk Raion, Donetsk Oblast, Ukraine. The population was 70 in the 2001 Ukrainian census.

== History ==
On 9 July 2024, the village was reportedly captured by the Russian army.
