= Novobakhmutivka, Novobakhmutivka Village Council =

Village in Ukraine

Novobakhmutivka Новобахмутівка
- Village
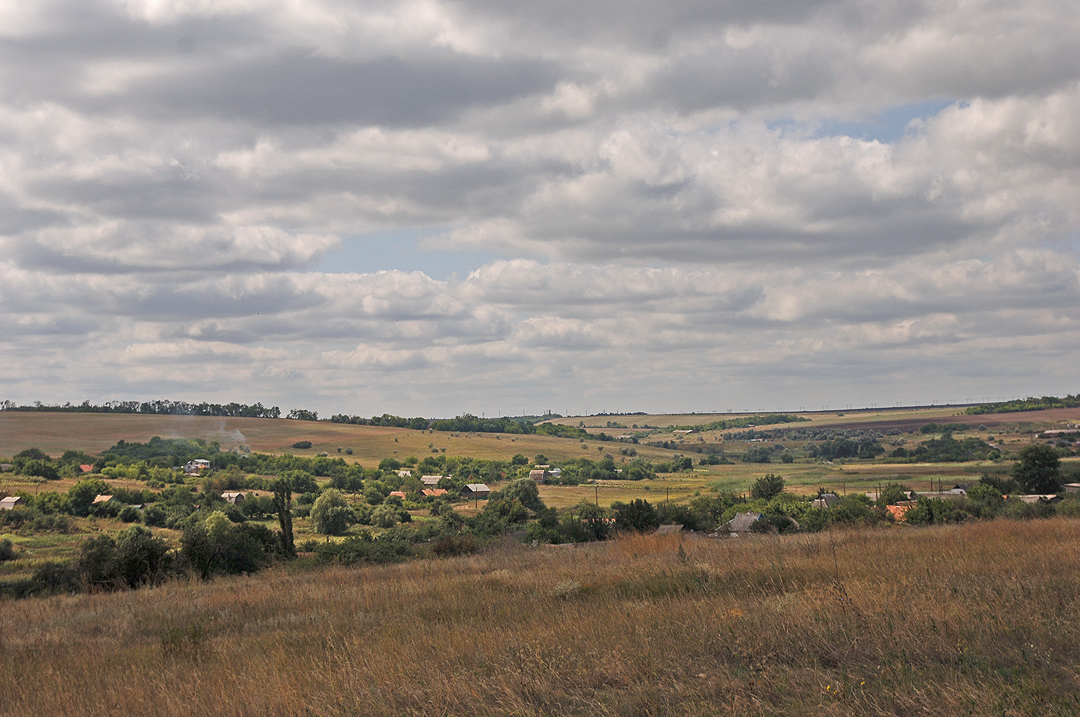
- Panorama of the village, August 2009
- Interactive map of Novobakhmutivka
- Location of Novobakhmutivka Novobakhmutivka (Ukraine)
- Coordinates: 48°14′56″N 37°46′55″E
- Country: Ukraine
- Oblast: Donetsk Oblast
- Raion: Pokrovsk Raion
- Hromada: Ocheretyne settlement hromada
- Elevation: 142 m (466 ft)

Population (2001 census)
  - Total: 857
- Time zone: UTC+2 (EET)
  - Summer (DST): UTC+3 (EEST)
- Postal code: 86198
- Area code: +380 6236

Novobakhmutivka (Ukrainian: Новобахмутівка) is a village in Ocheretyne settlement hromada of Pokrovsk Raion in Donetsk Oblast, Ukraine. The village was under the Novobakhmutivka Village Council prior to the formation of the hromada in 2020. As of 2001, the population was 857 people.

== Overview ==
The city of Yasynuvata is approximately 16 km away, accessible via a local road.

== Demographics ==
According to the 2001 Ukrainian census, the population of the village was 857 people, with 50.56% indicating Ukrainian as their native language and 49.33% indicating Russian.

== Notable people ==
The following people are from Novobakhmutivka :

- Boris Sergiyovych Val'kh – renowned zoologist, museologist, and environmentalist
- Hanna Andriyivna Repa – deputy of the Verkhovna Rada (Ukraine parliament) of the Ukrainian SSR of the 8th to 10th convocation
- Саєнко Іван Єгорович – literary critic
