= Novoselivka Druha =

Novoselivka Druha Новоселівка Друга
- Village
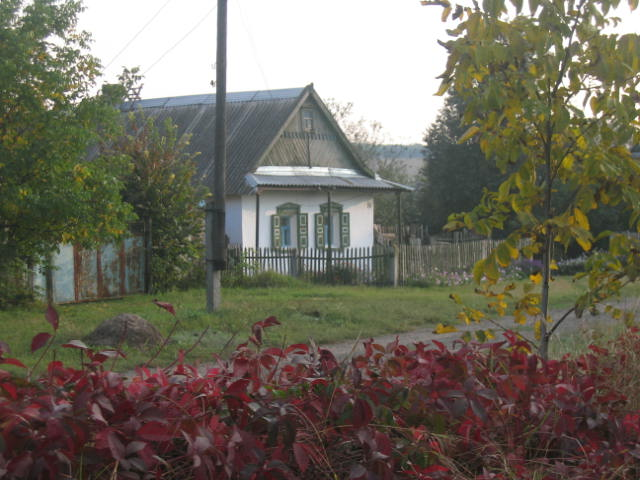
- Novoselivka Druha in 2008
- Interactive map of Novoselivka Druha
- Location within Donetsk Oblast Location within Ukraine
- Coordinates: 48.208889°N 37.7975°E
- Country: Ukraine
- Oblast: Donetsk Oblast
- Raion: Pokrovsk Raion
- Hromada: Ocheretyne settlement hromada
- Founded: 1893
- Elevation: 124 m (407 ft)

Population (2001 census)
  - Total: 131
- Time zone: UTC+2 (EET)
  - Summer (DST): UTC+3 (EEST)
- Postal code: 86042
- Area code: +380 6236
- KATOTTH: UA14160190180010485

Novoselivka Druha (Ukrainian: Новоселівка Друга; Russian: Новосёловка Вторая) is a village in Ocheretyne settlement hromada, Pokrovsk Raion, Donetsk Oblast, Ukraine. It is located 25.4 kilometres (15.8 mi) north from the centre of Donetsk city.

The War in Donbas, that started in mid-April 2014, brought along both civilian and military casualties. One Ukrainian serviceman was killed at the village on 24 January 2015, another soldier was wounded on 4 September 2017. On 4 July 2022, the village was captured by the Russian forces during the invasion of Ukraine at the Battle of Avdiivka.

== Demographics ==
In 2001 the settlement had 131 inhabitants. Native language as of the Ukrainian Census of 2001:

- Ukrainian – 28.24%
- Russian – 71.76%
