= Novoselivka Persha =

Settlement in Donetsk Oblast

Novoselivka Persha Новоселівка Перша
- Village
- Location of Novoselivka Persha within Ukraine Novoselivka Persha (Ukraine)
- Coordinates: 48.195556°N 37.531944°E
- Country: Ukraine
- Oblast Region: Donetsk Oblast
- Raion: Pokrovsk Raion
- Hromada: Ocheretyne settlement hromada
- Elevation: 161 m (528 ft)

Population (2001 census)
  - Total: 942
- Time zone: UTC+2 (EET)
  - Summer (DST): UTC+3 (EEST)
- Postal code: 86024
- Area code: +380 6236

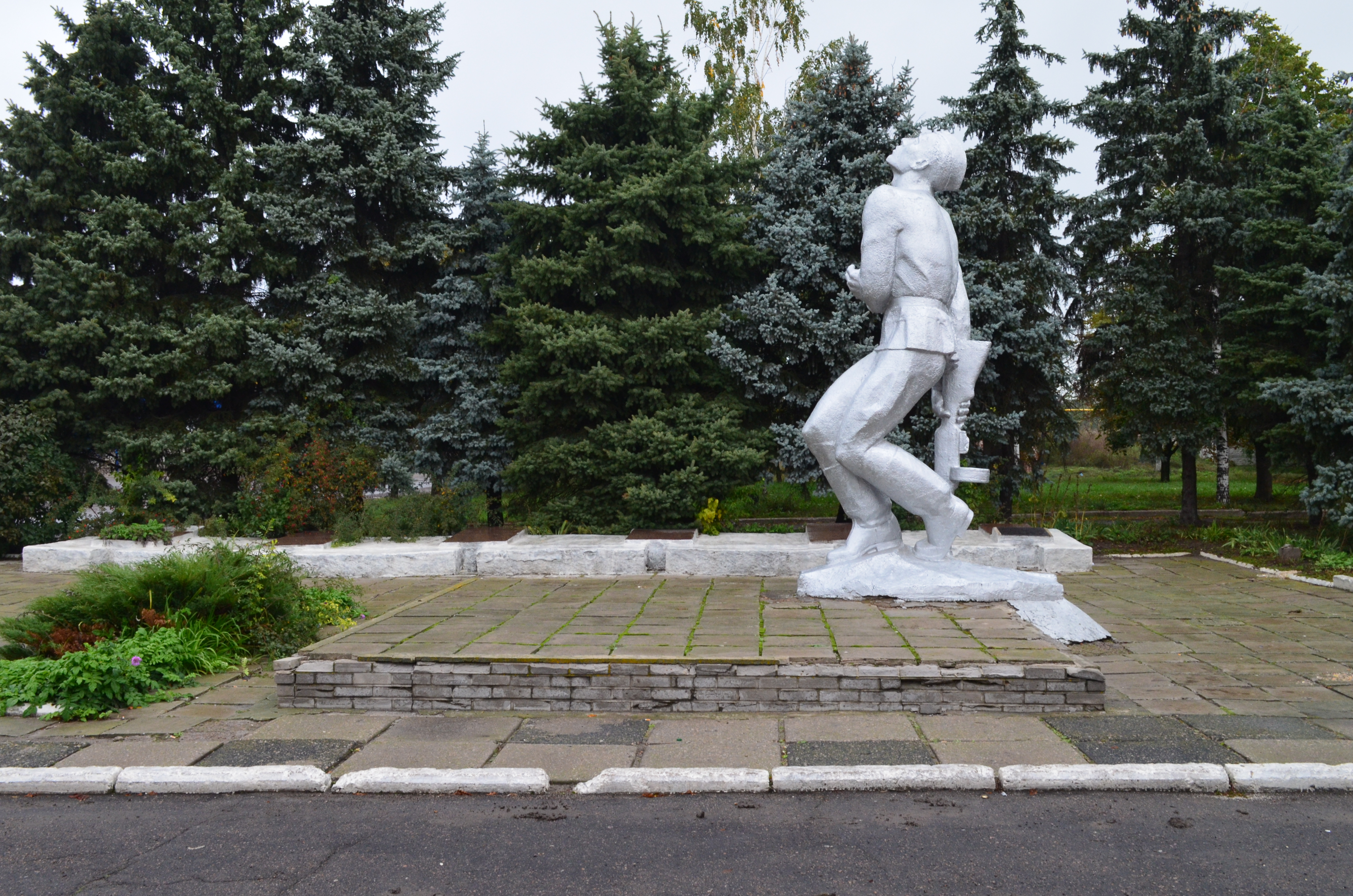
Mass grave of Soviet soldiers of the Southern Front, Yasynuvatsky district, Novoselivska-Persha rural district, Novoselivka Persha village, near the House of Culture.

Novoselivka Persha (Ukrainian: Новоселівка Перша; Russian: Новосёловка Первая) is a village in Ocheretyne settlement hromada, Pokrovsk Raion, Donetsk Oblast, Ukraine. It is located 28.02 kilometres (17.41 mi) northwest of the centre of Donetsk city.

== History ==
The village was founded in the middle of the 19th century.

=== Russo-Ukrainian War ===
==== War in Donbas ====
The settlement was fought over in the Donbas war, which brought both civilian and military casualties.

==== Russian invasion of Ukraine ====
Fighting between the warring parties continued during the Russian invasion of Ukraine, which began in 2022. Fighting came to the village in May 2024, following the battles of Ocheretyne and Avdiivka. The village came under increased Russian pressure in early June 2024.

In July 2024, Russian forces entered the settlement and began threatening Ukrainian presence, capturing most of it by 23 July. On 29 July, the village was completely captured by Russia.

== Demographics ==
As of the 2001 Ukrainian census, the settlement had 942 inhabitants, whose native languages were 76.58% Ukrainian, 23.32% Russian and 0.11% Moldovan.
