= Mezhove, Pokrovsk Raion, Donetsk Oblast =

Mezhove Межове
- Village
- Interactive map of Mezhove
- Location of Mezhove within Ukraine Mezhove (Ukraine)
- Coordinates: 48°11′06″N 37°29′38″E
- Country: Ukraine
- Oblast: Donetsk Oblast
- Raion: Pokrovsk Raion
- Hromada: Ocheretyne settlement hromada
- Elevation: 154 m (505 ft)

Population (2001 census)
  - Total: 36
- Time zone: UTC+2 (EET)
  - Summer (DST): UTC+3 (EEST)
- Postal code: 86024
- Area code: +380 6236

Mezhove (Ukrainian: Межове; Russian: Межевое) is a village in Ocheretyne settlement hromada, Pokrovsk Raion, Donetsk Oblast, Ukraine. It is located 29.4 kilometres (18.3 mi) northwest by north (NWbN) from the centre of Donetsk city.

== Geography ==
The village lies on the right bank of the Vovcha river. The absolute height is 154 metres above sea level.

== History ==
=== Russian invasion of Ukraine ===
The village was captured by Russian Forces during the full-scale Russian invasion of Ukraine in August 2024.

== Demographics ==
As of the 2001 Ukrainian census, the settlement had 36 inhabitants, whose native languages were 41.67% Ukrainian and 58.33% Russian.
