= Soloviove, Donetsk Oblast =

Village in Ukraine

Soloviove Соловйове
- Village
- Interactive map of Soloviove
- Location of Soloviove Soloviove (Ukraine)
- Coordinates: 48°13′29″N 37°35′51″E
- Country: Ukraine
- Oblast: Donetsk Oblast
- Raion: Pokrovsk Raion
- Hromada: Ocheretyne settlement hromada
- Elevation: 210 m (690 ft)

Population (2001)
  - Total: 223
- Time zone: UTC+2 (EET)
  - Summer (DST): UTC+3 (EEST)
- Postal code: 86020
- Area code: +380 6236

Soloviove (Ukrainian: Соловйове), also spelled Solovyove, is a village in the Ocheretyne settlement hromada of the Pokrovsk Raion, Donetsk Oblast, Ukraine. As of 2001, the population was 223 people.

== Overview ==
The district centre is approximately 30 km away, accessible via a local road.

== History ==
During the Russian invasion of Ukraine, Russian forces seized the village on 25 April 2024. According to the Ukrainian Military, before Soloviove was occupied, the Russian Military lost 20 pieces of armored equipment. These include T-72B3, T-80BV, T-90M Proryv tanks, BMP-1 and BMP-2 infantry fighting vehicles, BTR-82A and MT-LB armored personnel carriers.

== Demographics ==
According to 2001 census data, the population was 223 people, with 65.47% of the population indicating Ukrainian as their native language, 32.74% indicating Russian, 0.45% indicating Belarusian, and 0.45% indicating Armenian.
