= Novokalynove =

Village in Ukraine

Novokalynove Новокалинове
- Village
- Interactive map of Novokalynove
- Location of Novokalynove Novokalynove (Ukraine)
- Coordinates: 48°14′53″N 37°41′52″E
- Country: Ukraine
- Oblast: Donetsk Oblast
- District: Pokrovsk Raion
- Hromada: Ocheretyne settlement hromada
- Elevation: 163 m (535 ft)

Population (2001)
  - Total: 521
- Time zone: UTC+2 (EET)
  - Summer (DST): UTC+3 (EEST)
- Postal code: 86022
- Area code: +380 6236
- Climate: Dfa

Novokalynove (Ukrainian: Новокалинове) is a village in the Ocheretyne settlement hromada of the Pokrovsk Raion in Donetsk Oblast, Ukraine. As of 2001, the village had a population of 521 people.

== Overview ==
The village is approximately 28 km from the district centre, accessible via a local road.

Near the village is the Borci train station.

Novokalynove borders the village Kalynove in Kostiantynivka Raion, Donetsk Oblast.

== History ==
During the Russian invasion of Ukraine, the village was captured by Russian forces around late April 2024.

== Demographics ==
According to 2001 Ukrainian census, the village had a population of 521 people, with 78.5% indicating Ukrainian as their native language, 21.11% indicating Russian, and 0.19% indicating Moldovan.
