= Orlivka, Ocheretyne settlement hromada, Pokrovsk Raion, Donetsk Oblast =

Orlivka Орлівка
- Village
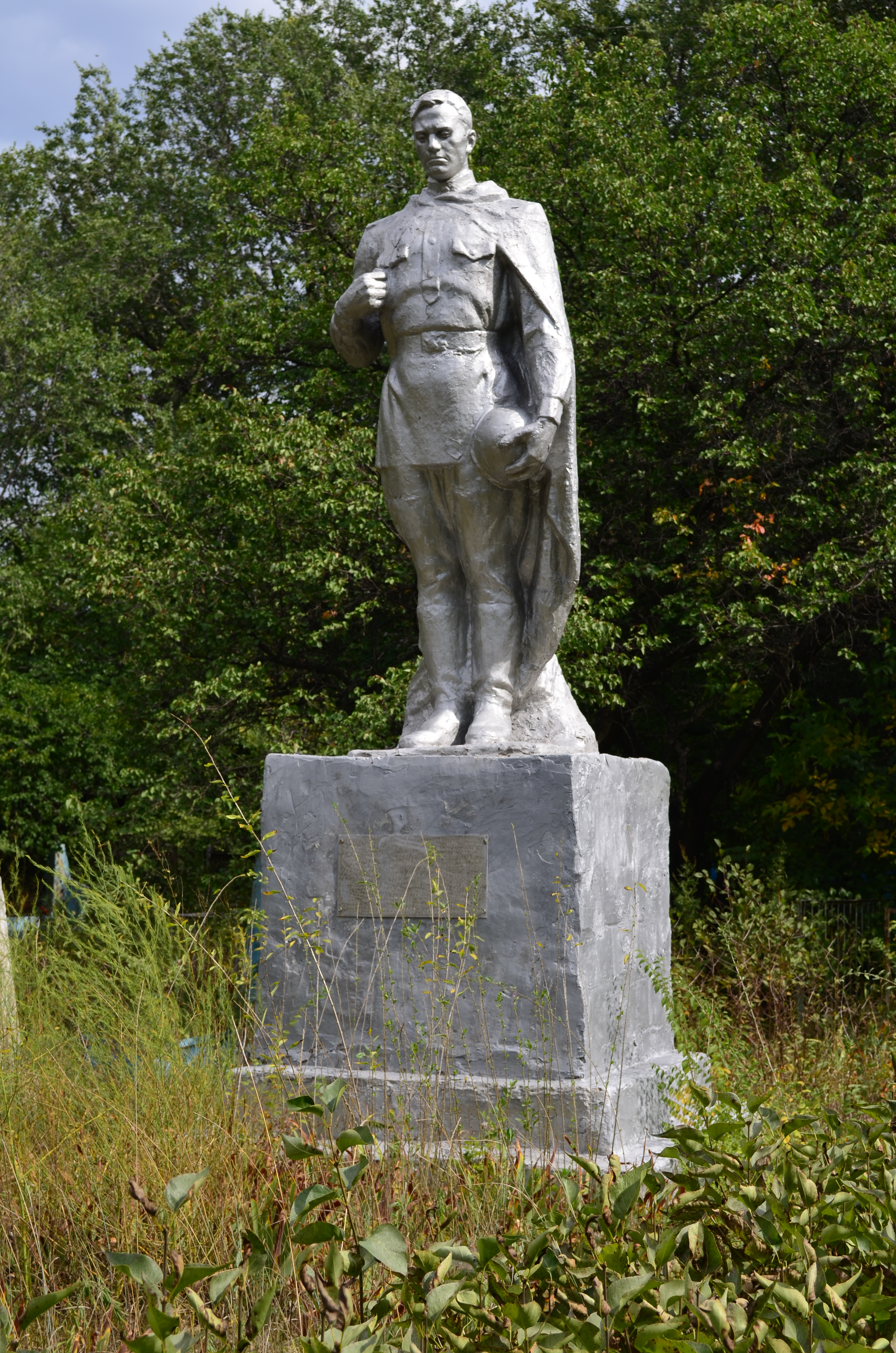
- Monument in Orlivka
- Interactive map of Orlivka
- Location within Donetsk Oblast Location within Ukraine
- Coordinates: 48°09′45″N 37°38′14″E
- Country: Ukraine
- Oblast: Donetsk Oblast
- Raion: Pokrovsk Raion
- Hromada: Ocheretyne settlement hromada
- Founded: 1847
- Elevation: 195 m (640 ft)

Population (2001 census)
  - Total: 874
- Time zone: UTC+2 (EET)
  - Summer (DST): UTC+3 (EEST)
- Postal code: 86050
- Area code: +380 6236
- KOATUU code: 14160190210082037

Orlivka (Ukrainian: Орлівка [orˈl⁽ʲ⁾iu̯kɐ]) is a village in Ocheretyne settlement hromada, Pokrovsk Raion, Donetsk Oblast, Ukraine.

== History ==
=== Russo-Ukrainian War ===
==== Russian invasion of Ukraine ====
During the Russian invasion of Ukraine, Orlivka has been the site of fighting since the end of the battle of Avdiivka in February 2024. On 19 March, Russia took over control of the village as the Ukrainian Armed Forces left the village.

== Demographics ==
As of the 2001 Ukrainian census, the settlement had 874 inhabitants. Their native languages were 25.71% Ukrainian, 74.14% Russian, 0.11% Belarusian and Moldovan (Romanian).
