= Novoselivka, Ocheretyne settlement hromada, Pokrovsk Raion, Donetsk Oblast =

Village in Donetsk Oblast, Ukraine

Novoselivka Новоселівка
- Village
- Interactive map of Novoselivka
- Location of Novoselivka in Donetsk Oblast Novoselivka (Ukraine)
- Coordinates: 48.272778°N 37.844167°E
- Country: Ukraine
- Oblast: Donetsk Oblast
- Raion: Pokrovsk Raion
- Elevation: 146 m (479 ft)

Population (2001 census)
  - Total: 541
- Time zone: UTC+2 (EET)
  - Summer (DST): UTC+3 (EEST)
- Postal code: 86031
- Area code: +380 6236

Novoselivka (Ukrainian: Новоселівка; Russian: Новосёловка) is a village in Pokrovsk Raion (district) in Donetsk Oblast of eastern Ukraine, at about 22.2 kilometres (13.8 mi) north by east of the centre of Donetsk city. It belongs to Ocheretyne settlement hromada, one of the hromadas of Ukraine.

The settlement came under attack by Russian forces during the Russian invasion of Ukraine in 2022.

== Demographics ==
The settlement had 541 inhabitants in 2001, language distribution as of the Ukrainian Census of the same year:

- Ukrainian: 73.75%
- Russian: 25.28%
- Belarusian: 0.18%
