= Kryvorizhzhia rural hromada =

Kryvorizhzhia rural hromada Криворізька сільська громада
- Hromada
- Interactive map of Kryvorizhzhia rural hromada
- Country: Ukraine
- Oblast: Donetsk Oblast
- Raion: Pokrovsk Raion

Area
  - Total: 276.5 km^{2} (106.8 sq mi)

Population (2020)
  - Total: 4,011
  - Density: 14.51/km^{2} (37.57/sq mi)
- Settlements: 22
- Villages: 22

Kryvorizhzhia rural hromada (Ukrainian: Криворізька селищна громада) is a hromada of Ukraine, located in Pokrovsk Raion, Donetsk Oblast. Its administrative center is the village of Kryvorizhzhia.

It has an area of 276.5 square kilometres (106.8 mi^{2}) and a population of 4,011, as of 2020.

The hromada contains 22 settlements, which are all villages:

- Dobropillia
- Hulive
- Kamianka
- Krasnopodillia
- Kryvorizhzhia
- Lyman
- Matiasheve
- Myrne
- Nadiia
- Novohryshyne
- Novofedorivka
- Novokryvorizhzhia
- Novomarivka
- Novooleksandrivka
- Petrivske
- Raksha
- Shylivka
- Vasylivka
- Yuriivske
- Zavydo-Borzenka
- Zavydo-Kudasheve
- Zelene

== See also ==
- List of hromadas of Ukraine
