= Troitske, Pokrovsk Raion, Donetsk Oblast =

Troitske Троїцьке
- Village
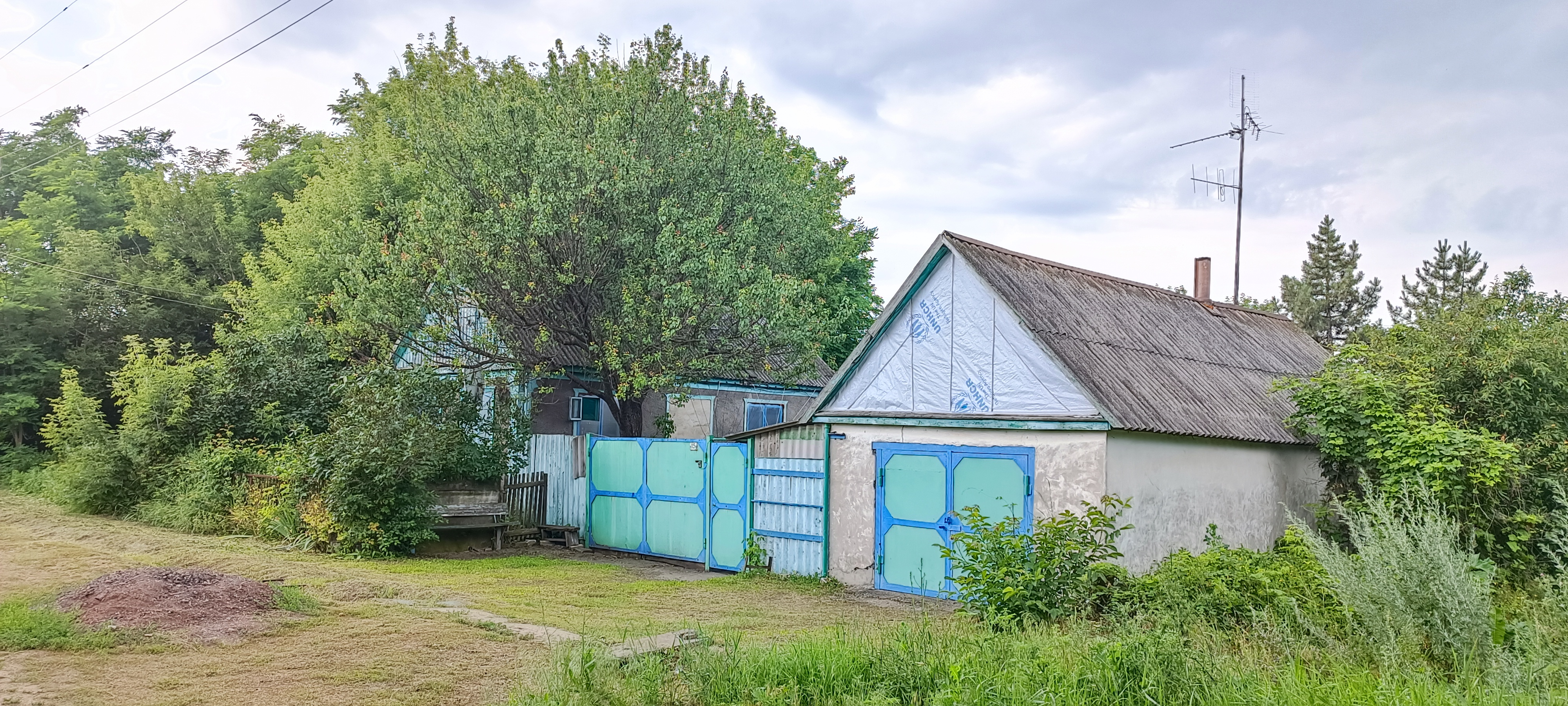
- Interactive map of Troitske
- Location of Troitske within Ukraine Troitske (Ukraine)
- Coordinates: 48°15′35″N 37°51′28″E
- Country: Ukraine
- Oblast: Donetsk Oblast
- Raion: Pokrovsk Raion
- Hromada: Ocheretyne settlement hromada
- Elevation: 113 m (371 ft)

Population (2001 census)
  - Total: 239
- Time zone: UTC+2 (EET)
  - Summer (DST): UTC+3 (EEST)
- Postal code: 86031
- Area code: +380 6236

Troitske (Ukrainian: Троїцьке; Russian: Троицкое) is a village in Pokrovsk Raion (district) in Donetsk Oblast of eastern Ukraine, at 31.1 km NNE from the centre of Donetsk city. On May 14, 2022, the Donetsk People's Republic militia's 1st mechanised battalion took control over the village from the Ukrainian Armed Forces.

== Demographics ==
In 2001 the settlement had 239 inhabitants. As of the Ukrainian Census of 2001, Ukrainian is the native language of 87.03% of the population and Russian the native language of 12.55% of the population.
