= Tonenke =

Tonenke Тоненьке
- Village
- Interactive map of Tonenke
- Location of Tonenke within Ukraine Tonenke (Ukraine)
- Coordinates: 48°8′25″N 37°38′17″E
- Country: Ukraine
- Oblast: Donetsk Oblast
- Raion: Pokrovsk Raion
- Hromada: Ocheretyne settlement hromada
- Elevation: 175 m (574 ft)

Population (2001 census)
  - Total: 320
- Time zone: UTC+2 (EET)
  - Summer (DST): UTC+3 (EEST)
- Postal code: 86050
- Area code: +380 6236

Tonenke (Ukrainian: Тоненьке, pronounced [toˈnɛnʲke]; Russian: Тоненькое, romanized: Tonen'koye) is a village in Pokrovsk Raion (district) in Donetsk Oblast of eastern Ukraine, at 23.5 kilometres (14.6 mi) northwest (NW) of the centre of Donetsk city.

== History ==
=== Russo-Ukrainian War ===
War in Donbas

The War in Donbas, that started in mid-April 2014, has brought along both civilian and military casualties. One civilian was killed by shelling on 12 November 2016. One Ukrainian serviceman was killed on 31 January 2017. Until 18 July 2020, Tonenke belonged to Yasynuvata Raion.

Russian invasion of Ukraine

Russia claimed to have captured Tonenke on 21 March 2024. This was confirmed by unofficial Ukrainian sources on 27 March.

== Demographics ==
Native language as of the Ukrainian Census of 2001:

- Ukrainian — 65.94%
- Russian — 33.44%
- Polish — 0.31%
