= Pokrovsk Raion =

Subdivision of Donetsk Oblast, Ukraine

Pokrovsk Raion Покровський район
- Raion
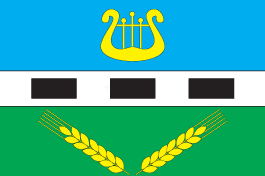
- Flag Coat of arms
- Interactive map of Pokrovsk Raion
- Coordinates: 48°15′34.8438″N 37°22′35.9832″E
- Country: Ukraine
- Oblast: Donetsk
- Admin. center: Pokrovsk
- Subdivisions: 14 hromadas

Government
  - Mayor: Ruslan Trebushkin

Area
  - Total: 4,020 km^{2} (1,550 sq mi)

Population (2022)
  - Total: 386,451
  - Density: 96.1/km^{2} (249/sq mi)
- Time zone: UTC+02:00 (EET)
  - Summer (DST): UTC+03:00 (EEST)
- Postal index: 853-XX
- Area code: 380

Pokrovsk Raion (Ukrainian: Покровський район, romanized: Pokrovskyi raion; Russian: Покровский район, romanized: Pokrovsky rayon) is a raion (district) within Donetsk Oblast in eastern Ukraine. Its administrative center is Pokrovsk. It has an area of 1,316 square kilometres (508 sq mi) and its population is approximately 386,451 (2022 estimate).

An architectural monument in the raion is the Petropavlovs'ka Church (1840 – village of Krasne), Church of the Birth of the Theotokos (Ukrainian: церква Різдва Богородиці) (1799 – urban-type settlement of Novoekonomichne), and the Voznesens'ka Church (1893 – village of Novotroyits'ke). The composer Sergei Prokofiev (1891–1953) was born in Sontsivka.

== Subdivisions ==
After the reform in July 2020, the raion consists of 14 hromadas:

- Avdiivka urban hromada
- Bilozerske urban hromada
- Hrodivka settlement hromada
- Dobropillia urban hromada
- Kryvorizhzhia rural hromada
- Kurakhove urban hromada
- Marinka urban hromada
- Myrnohrad urban hromada
- Novohrodivka urban hromada
- Ocheretyne settlement hromada
- Pokrovsk urban hromada
- Selydove urban hromada
- Shakhove rural hromada
- Udachne settlement hromada

== History ==
In May 2014, the raion requested a referendum for its absorption into the Dnipropetrovsk Oblast, citing the instability in the Donetsk Oblast and order and stability in Dnipropetrovsk. Dnipropetrovsk governor Ihor Kolomoisky said that the oblast was willing to do so, assuming it was popular opinion in the raion.

On 21 May 2016, Verkhovna Rada adopted decision to rename Krasnoarmiisk Raion to Pokrovsk Raion and Krasnoarmiisk to Pokrovsk according to the law prohibiting names of Communist origin.

On 18 July 2020, as part of the administrative reform of Ukraine, the number of raions of Donetsk Oblast was reduced to eight, of which only five were controlled by the government, and the area of Pokrovsk Raion was significantly expanded. The January 2020 estimate of the raion population was 29,449 (2020 est.)

== Demographics ==
44 different nationalities live in Pokrovsk Raion. They include: Ukrainians, Russians, Belarusians, Germans, Azerbaijanis, Crimean Tatars, Moldavians, Armenians, Greeks and others. As of the 2001 Ukrainian census:

	Population	Percentage, %
Ukrainian	32,592	86.8
Russian	4,250	11.3
Belarusian	259	0.7

== See also ==
- Administrative divisions of Donetsk Oblast
