= List of villages in Donetsk Oblast =

There are approximately 963 villages (Ukrainian: села, romanized: sela) (Note: Села is the plural Ukrainian word for village. The translation for the singular form "village" in Ukrainian is село (selo).) in Donetsk Oblast, Ukraine. Villages are one of the smallest and most basic type of populated place in Ukraine, with the designation reserved by the Verkhovna Rada, the country's parliament, for settlements with populations of less than 5,000 people.

== List ==
Villages in Donetsk Oblast
Name	Name (in Ukrainian) (Note: Links to the Ukrainian Wikipedia articles for each village)	Population (2001 census)	Administrative divisions		KATOTTH ID
Name	Name (in Ukrainian)	Population (2001 census)	Hromada	Raion	KATOTTH ID
Andriivka	Андріївка	74	Bakhmut urban hromada	Bakhmut Raion	UA14020010030085322
Berkhivka	Берхівка	120	Bakhmut urban hromada	Bakhmut Raion	UA14020010040033862
Vershyna	Вершина	24	Bakhmut urban hromada	Bakhmut Raion	UA14020010050042024
Vesela Dolyna	Весела Долина	273	Bakhmut urban hromada	Bakhmut Raion	UA14020010060090160
Vidrodzhennia	Відродження	278	Bakhmut urban hromada	Bakhmut Raion	UA14020010070034525
Zaitseve	Зайцеве	1,160	Bakhmut urban hromada	Bakhmut Raion	UA14020010080032808
Ivanhrad	Іванград	167	Bakhmut urban hromada	Bakhmut Raion	UA14020010090074287
Ivanivske	Іванівське	1,732	Bakhmut urban hromada	Bakhmut Raion	UA14020010100058978
Klishchiivka	Кліщіївка	512	Bakhmut urban hromada	Bakhmut Raion	UA14020010120064151
Klynove	Клинове	826	Bakhmut urban hromada	Bakhmut Raion	UA14020010110036574
Midna Ruda	Мідна Руда	9	Bakhmut urban hromada	Bakhmut Raion	UA14020010130026317
Nova Kamianka	Нова Кам'янка	14	Bakhmut urban hromada	Bakhmut Raion	UA14020010140044558
Pokrovske	Покровське	1,321	Bakhmut urban hromada	Bakhmut Raion	UA14020010150059879
Bohdanivka	Богданівка	97	Chasiv Yar urban hromada	Bakhmut Raion	UA14020130020016018
Hryhorivka	Григорівка	92	Chasiv Yar urban hromada	Bakhmut Raion	UA14020130030056885
Hryhorivka	Григорівка	90	Siversk urban hromada	Bakhmut Raion	UA14020070020050890
Dronivka	Дронівка	613	Siversk urban hromada	Bakhmut Raion	UA14020070030038541
Platonivka	Платонівка	42	Siversk urban hromada	Bakhmut Raion	UA14020070040057470
Riznykivka	Різниківка	578	Siversk urban hromada	Bakhmut Raion	UA14020070050060090
Sviato-Pokrovske	Свято-Покровське	539	Siversk urban hromada	Bakhmut Raion	UA14020070060097228
Serebrianka	Серебрянка	1,100	Siversk urban hromada	Bakhmut Raion	UA14020070070025691
Bakhmutske	Бахмутське	774	Soledar urban hromada	Bakhmut Raion	UA14020090020089360
Berestove	Берестове	1,269	Soledar urban hromada	Bakhmut Raion	UA14020090030024194
Bilohorivka	Білогорівка	127	Soledar urban hromada	Bakhmut Raion	UA14020090040035720
Blahodatne	Благодатне	137	Soledar urban hromada	Bakhmut Raion	UA14020090050095821
Bondarne	Бондарне	43	Soledar urban hromada	Bakhmut Raion	UA14020090060075345
Dibrova	Діброва	22	Soledar urban hromada	Bakhmut Raion	UA14020090120055760
Dubovo-Vasylivka	Дубово-Василівка	13	Soledar urban hromada	Bakhmut Raion	UA14020090130067996
Fedorivka	Федорівка	409	Soledar urban hromada	Bakhmut Raion	UA14020090300022940
Fedorivka Druha	Федорівка Друга	84	Soledar urban hromada	Bakhmut Raion	UA14020090310060118
Holubivka	Голубівка	40	Soledar urban hromada	Bakhmut Raion	UA14020090110062269
Khromivka	Хромівка	34	Soledar urban hromada	Bakhmut Raion	UA14020090320068253
Krasnopolivka	Краснополівка	33	Soledar urban hromada	Bakhmut Raion	UA14020090150024401
Lypivka	Липівка	6	Soledar urban hromada	Bakhmut Raion	UA14020090160027468
Lypove	Липове	56	Soledar urban hromada	Bakhmut Raion	UA14020090170030880
Minkivka	Міньківка	800	Soledar urban hromada	Bakhmut Raion	UA14020090190081260
Mykolaivka	Миколаївка	43	Soledar urban hromada	Bakhmut Raion	UA14020090180089222
Nykyforivka	Никифорівка	645	Soledar urban hromada	Bakhmut Raion	UA14020090200060810
Orikhovo-Vasylivka	Оріхово-Василівка	227	Soledar urban hromada	Bakhmut Raion	UA14020090210095170
Paraskoviivka	Парасковіївка	2,802	Soledar urban hromada	Bakhmut Raion	UA14020090230096003
Pazeno	Пазено	16	Soledar urban hromada	Bakhmut Raion	UA14020090220044513
Pryvillia	Привілля	136	Soledar urban hromada	Bakhmut Raion	UA14020090250019887
Pylypchatyne	Пилипчатине	70	Soledar urban hromada	Bakhmut Raion	UA14020090240010520
Rozdolivka	Роздолівка	735	Soledar urban hromada	Bakhmut Raion	UA14020090260072836
Sakko i Vantsetti	Сакко І Ванцетті	3	Soledar urban hromada	Bakhmut Raion	UA14020090270041471
Striapivka	Стряпівка	50	Soledar urban hromada	Bakhmut Raion	UA14020090280094715
Trypillia	Трипілля	194	Soledar urban hromada	Bakhmut Raion	UA14020090290069750
Vasiukivka	Васюківка	600	Soledar urban hromada	Bakhmut Raion	UA14020090080076780
Vasylivka	Василівка	142	Soledar urban hromada	Bakhmut Raion	UA14020090070016518
Vesele	Веселе	102	Soledar urban hromada	Bakhmut Raion	UA14020090090056193
Volodymyrivka	Володимирівка	1,120	Soledar urban hromada	Bakhmut Raion	UA14020090100090447
Yakovlivka	Яковлівка	1,326	Soledar urban hromada	Bakhmut Raion	UA14020090330079247
Zaliznianske	Залізнянське	2	Soledar urban hromada	Bakhmut Raion	UA14020090140045297
Dacha	Дача	33	Svitlodarsk urban hromada	Bakhmut Raion	UA14020050060050756
Vozdvyzhenka	Воздвиженка	333	Svitlodarsk urban hromada	Bakhmut Raion	UA14020050050046052
Kodema	Кодема	584	Svitlodarsk urban hromada	Bakhmut Raion	UA14020050070023182
Krynychne	Криничне	41	Svitlodarsk urban hromada	Bakhmut Raion	UA14020050080097323
Mykolaivka	Миколаївка	16	Svitlodarsk urban hromada	Bakhmut Raion	UA14020050100062404
Mykolaivka Druha	Миколаївка Друга	7	Svitlodarsk urban hromada	Bakhmut Raion	UA14020050110066801
Lozove	Лозове	48	Svitlodarsk urban hromada	Bakhmut Raion	UA14020050090071406
Myronivka	Миронівка	58	Svitlodarsk urban hromada	Bakhmut Raion	UA14020050120065338
Odradivka	Одрадівка	152	Svitlodarsk urban hromada	Bakhmut Raion	UA14020050130039070
Rozsadky	Розсадки	32	Svitlodarsk urban hromada	Bakhmut Raion	UA14020050140037916
Semyhiria	Семигір'я	346	Svitlodarsk urban hromada	Bakhmut Raion	UA14020050150038740
Leonidivka	Леонідівка	115	Toretsk urban hromada	Bakhmut Raion	UA14020110100011073
Yuriivka	Юріївка	32	Toretsk urban hromada	Bakhmut Raion	UA14020110110082805
Verkhnokamianske	Верхньокам'янське	959	Zvanivka rural hromada	Bakhmut Raion	UA14020030020040419
Zvanivka	Званівка	1,428	Zvanivka rural hromada	Bakhmut Raion	UA14020030010045953
Ivano-Darivka	Івано-Дар'ївка	29	Zvanivka rural hromada	Bakhmut Raion	UA14020030030030735
Kuzmynivka	Кузьминівка	29	Zvanivka rural hromada	Bakhmut Raion	UA14020030040049772
Novoselivka	Новоселівка	1	Zvanivka rural hromada	Bakhmut Raion	UA14020030050072966
Pereizne	Переїзне	846	Zvanivka rural hromada	Bakhmut Raion	UA14020030060018536
Artemivka	Артемівка	630	Amvrosiivka urban hromada	Donetsk Raion	UA14080010040024869
Biloiarivka	Білоярівка	1,492	Amvrosiivka urban hromada	Donetsk Raion	UA14080010050055312
Blahodatne	Благодатне	3,648	Amvrosiivka urban hromada	Donetsk Raion	UA14080010060071170
Hryhorivka	Григорівка	274	Amvrosiivka urban hromada	Donetsk Raion	UA14080010110072972
Kalynove	Калинове	223	Amvrosiivka urban hromada	Donetsk Raion	UA14080010130087123
Karpovo-Nadezhdynka	Карпово-Надеждинка	627	Amvrosiivka urban hromada	Donetsk Raion	UA14080010140019877
Kyselivka	Киселівка	52	Amvrosiivka urban hromada	Donetsk Raion	UA14080010150013913
Komyshuvakha	Комишуваха	37	Amvrosiivka urban hromada	Donetsk Raion	UA14080010160098475
Kosharne	Кошарне	73	Amvrosiivka urban hromada	Donetsk Raion	UA14080010170067714
Krasnyi Luch	Красний Луч	46	Amvrosiivka urban hromada	Donetsk Raion	UA14080010180039570
Mala Shyshivka	Мала Шишівка	142	Amvrosiivka urban hromada	Donetsk Raion	UA14080010190087209
Manych	Манич	76	Amvrosiivka urban hromada	Donetsk Raion	UA14080010200037583
Mokroielanchyk	Мокроєланчик	593	Amvrosiivka urban hromada	Donetsk Raion	UA14080010210011184
Novoivanivka	Новоіванівка	625	Amvrosiivka urban hromada	Donetsk Raion	UA14080010230092730
Novoielanchyk	Новоєланчик	84	Amvrosiivka urban hromada	Donetsk Raion	UA14080010220077342
Novoklynivka	Новоклинівка	227	Amvrosiivka urban hromada	Donetsk Raion	UA14080010240089728
Novoukrainske	Новоукраїнське	16	Amvrosiivka urban hromada	Donetsk Raion	UA14080010250040207
Oleksiivske	Олексіївське	438	Amvrosiivka urban hromada	Donetsk Raion	UA14080010260049009
Olhynske	Ольгинське	223	Amvrosiivka urban hromada	Donetsk Raion	UA14080010270027519
Pavlivske	Павлівське	62	Amvrosiivka urban hromada	Donetsk Raion	UA14080010280086048
Petropavlivka	Петропавлівка	247	Amvrosiivka urban hromada	Donetsk Raion	UA14080010290058148
Sadove	Садове	193	Amvrosiivka urban hromada	Donetsk Raion	UA14080010300051363
Svystuny	Свистуни	6	Amvrosiivka urban hromada	Donetsk Raion	UA14080010310042461
Semenivske	Семенівське	129	Amvrosiivka urban hromada	Donetsk Raion	UA14080010320038648
Siiatel	Сіятель	55	Amvrosiivka urban hromada	Donetsk Raion	UA14080010330081658
Uspenka	Успенка	1,483	Amvrosiivka urban hromada	Donetsk Raion	UA14080010340033451
Vasylivka	Василівка	878	Amvrosiivka urban hromada	Donetsk Raion	UA14080010070069293
Velyke Mishkove	Велике Мішкове	859	Amvrosiivka urban hromada	Donetsk Raion	UA14080010080064127
Verkhnoielanchyk	Верхньоєланчик	244	Amvrosiivka urban hromada	Donetsk Raion	UA14080010090019744
Vilkhivchyk	Вільхівчик	125	Amvrosiivka urban hromada	Donetsk Raion	UA14080010100037762
Yelyzaveto-Mykolaivka	Єлизавето-Миколаївка	769	Amvrosiivka urban hromada	Donetsk Raion	UA14080010120099296
Byriuky	Бирюки	695	Donetsk urban hromada	Donetsk Raion	UA14080030070087945
Verbova Balka	Вербова Балка	138	Donetsk urban hromada	Donetsk Raion	UA14080030080070237
Hryshky	Гришки	61	Donetsk urban hromada	Donetsk Raion	UA14080030090076165
Kyslyche	Кисличе	78	Donetsk urban hromada	Donetsk Raion	UA14080030100015379
Mykhailivka	Михайлівка	64	Donetsk urban hromada	Donetsk Raion	UA14080030110044385
Novodvirske	Новодвірське	61	Donetsk urban hromada	Donetsk Raion	UA14080030120090137
Pavlohradske	Павлоградське	359	Donetsk urban hromada	Donetsk Raion	UA14080030130052213
Temriuk	Темрюк	246	Donetsk urban hromada	Donetsk Raion	UA14080030140056756
Ahronomichne	Агрономічне	355	Ilovaisk urban hromada	Donetsk Raion	UA14080050030036560
Hryhorivka	Григорівка	156	Ilovaisk urban hromada	Donetsk Raion	UA14080050050089753
Verbivka	Вербівка	118	Ilovaisk urban hromada	Donetsk Raion	UA14080050040012504
Mnohopillia	Многопілля	308	Ilovaisk urban hromada	Donetsk Raion	UA14080050070090592
Zelene	Зелене	551	Ilovaisk urban hromada	Donetsk Raion	UA14080050060078611
Pokrovka	Покровка	465	Ilovaisk urban hromada	Donetsk Raion	UA14080050080040495
Poltavske	Полтавське	166	Ilovaisk urban hromada	Donetsk Raion	UA14080050090046624
Rusko-Orlivka	Русько-Орлівка	76	Ilovaisk urban hromada	Donetsk Raion	UA14080050100075563
Sadove	Садове	191	Ilovaisk urban hromada	Donetsk Raion	UA14080050110094629
Stepano-Krynka	Степано-Кринка	949	Ilovaisk urban hromada	Donetsk Raion	UA14080050120040022
Tretiaky	Третяки	258	Ilovaisk urban hromada	Donetsk Raion	UA14080050130070843
Chervonosilske	Червоносільське	140	Ilovaisk urban hromada	Donetsk Raion	UA14080050150026851
Fedorivka	Федорівка	233	Ilovaisk urban hromada	Donetsk Raion	UA14080050140036814
Dubivka	Дубівка	50	Khartsyzk urban hromada	Donetsk Raion	UA14080090110038683
Zolotarivka	Золотарівка	1,189	Khartsyzk urban hromada	Donetsk Raion	UA14080090120018609
Novomykolaivka	Новомиколаївка	42	Khartsyzk urban hromada	Donetsk Raion	UA14080090130073468
Novopelahiivka	Новопелагіївка	276	Khartsyzk urban hromada	Donetsk Raion	UA14080090140016716
Tsupky	Цупки	87	Khartsyzk urban hromada	Donetsk Raion	UA14080090160050123
Pivche	Півче	61	Khartsyzk urban hromada	Donetsk Raion	UA14080090150037709
Krasna Zoria	Красна Зоря	143	Makiivka urban hromada	Donetsk Raion	UA14080070200058117
Lypove	Липове	115	Makiivka urban hromada	Donetsk Raion	UA14080070210092390
Molocharka	Молочарка	43	Makiivka urban hromada	Donetsk Raion	UA14080070220044930
Novoselivka	Новоселівка	260	Makiivka urban hromada	Donetsk Raion	UA14080070230020085
Orikhove	Оріхове	371	Makiivka urban hromada	Donetsk Raion	UA14080070240043332
Shevchenko	Шевченко	87	Makiivka urban hromada	Donetsk Raion	UA14080070250073401
Verkhnia Krynka	Верхня Кринка	561	Makiivka urban hromada	Donetsk Raion	UA14080070190088250
Spartak	Спартак	1,956	Yasynuvata urban hromada	Donetsk Raion	UA14080110030096369
Vesele	Веселе	569	Yasynuvata urban hromada	Donetsk Raion	UA14080110020051699
Yakovlivka	Яковлівка	971	Yasynuvata urban hromada	Donetsk Raion	UA14080110040066771
Hrabove	Грабове	1,004	Chystiakove urban hromada	Horlivka Raion	UA14060150040053522
Rivne	Рівне	353	Chystiakove urban hromada	Horlivka Raion	UA14060150050085423
Debaltsivske	Дебальцівське	678	Debaltseve urban hromada	Horlivka Raion	UA14060050020031440
Kalynivka	Калинівка	112	Debaltseve urban hromada	Horlivka Raion	UA14060050030078925
Lohvynove	Логвинове	57	Debaltseve urban hromada	Horlivka Raion	UA14060050040077418
Novohryhorivka	Новогригорівка	475	Debaltseve urban hromada	Horlivka Raion	UA14060050060073091
Nyzhnie Lozove	Нижнє Лозове	11	Debaltseve urban hromada	Horlivka Raion	UA14060050050013996
Sanzharivka	Санжарівка	8	Debaltseve urban hromada	Horlivka Raion	UA14060050070017687
Mykhailivka	Михайлівка	625	Horlivka urban hromada	Horlivka Raion	UA14060030040024147
Riasne	Рясне	9	Horlivka urban hromada	Horlivka Raion	UA14060030050092010
Vesele	Веселе	23	Khrestivka urban hromada	Horlivka Raion	UA14060130020018501
Vidrodzhennia	Відродження	43	Khrestivka urban hromada	Horlivka Raion	UA14060130030013925
Komyshatka	Комишатка	500	Khrestivka urban hromada	Horlivka Raion	UA14060130040065611
Krasnyi Luch	Красний Луч	166	Khrestivka urban hromada	Horlivka Raion	UA14060130050057896
Kruhlyk	Круглик	21	Khrestivka urban hromada	Horlivka Raion	UA14060130060015845
Maloorlivka	Малоорлівка	1,215	Khrestivka urban hromada	Horlivka Raion	UA14060130070089524
Mykhailivka	Михайлівка	653	Khrestivka urban hromada	Horlivka Raion	UA14060130080055801
Nikishyne	Нікішине	878	Khrestivka urban hromada	Horlivka Raion	UA14060130090092206
Novoorlivka	Новоорлівка	322	Khrestivka urban hromada	Horlivka Raion	UA14060130100088048
Petropavlivka	Петропавлівка	949	Khrestivka urban hromada	Horlivka Raion	UA14060130120048808
Rozsypne	Розсипне	487	Khrestivka urban hromada	Horlivka Raion	UA14060130130030162
Stizhkove	Стіжкове	185	Khrestivka urban hromada	Horlivka Raion	UA14060130140081706
Striukove	Стрюкове	151	Khrestivka urban hromada	Horlivka Raion	UA14060130150045601
Tymofiivka	Тимофіївка	80	Khrestivka urban hromada	Horlivka Raion	UA14060130160085045
Shevchenko	Шевченко	64	Khrestivka urban hromada	Horlivka Raion	UA14060130170098799
Sulynivka	Сулинівка	962	Khrestivka urban hromada	Horlivka Raion	UA14060130110052016
Shaposhnykove	Шапошникове	15	Shakhtarsk urban hromada	Horlivka Raion	UA14060170080027524
Ternove	Тернове	419	Shakhtarsk urban hromada	Horlivka Raion	UA14060170070086050
Velyka Shyshivka	Велика Шишівка	714	Shakhtarsk urban hromada	Horlivka Raion	UA14060170060074706
Manuilivka	Мануйлівка	712	Snizhne urban hromada	Horlivka Raion	UA14060110170075044
Marynivka	Маринівка	626	Snizhne urban hromada	Horlivka Raion	UA14060110180026446
Perederiieve	Передерієве	7	Snizhne urban hromada	Horlivka Raion	UA14060110190060813
Petrivske	Петрівське	361	Snizhne urban hromada	Horlivka Raion	UA14060110200066687
Rozsypne	Розсипне	80	Snizhne urban hromada	Horlivka Raion	UA14060110210069605
Saurivka	Саурівка	89	Snizhne urban hromada	Horlivka Raion	UA14060110220029001
Stepanivka	Степанівка	1,371	Snizhne urban hromada	Horlivka Raion	UA14060110230075761
Tarany	Тарани	51	Snizhne urban hromada	Horlivka Raion	UA14060110240056651
Latysheve	Латишеве	298	Snizhne urban hromada	Horlivka Raion	UA14060110160085022
Verkhnii Kut	Верхній Кут	9	Snizhne urban hromada	Horlivka Raion	UA14060110120075326
Dibrivka	Дібрівка	377	Snizhne urban hromada	Horlivka Raion	UA14060110130081482
Dmytrivka	Дмитрівка	3,292	Snizhne urban hromada	Horlivka Raion	UA14060110140043778
Zrubne	Зрубне	105	Snizhne urban hromada	Horlivka Raion	UA14060110150065292
Chervona Zoria	Червона Зоря	61	Snizhne urban hromada	Horlivka Raion	UA14060110250079186
Chuhuno-Krepynka	Чугуно-Крепинка	86	Snizhne urban hromada	Horlivka Raion	UA14060110260095214
Vesela Dolyna	Весела Долина	5	Vuhlehirsk urban hromada	Horlivka Raion	UA14060010070017378
Avilovka	Авіловка	49	Yenakiieve urban hromada	Horlivka Raion	UA14060070060034445
Krynychky	Кринички	84	Yenakiieve urban hromada	Horlivka Raion	UA14060070080087399
Verkhnia Krynka	Верхня Кринка	119	Yenakiieve urban hromada	Horlivka Raion	UA14060070070054955
Novoselivka	Новоселівка	163	Yenakiieve urban hromada	Horlivka Raion	UA14060070090081074
Puteprovid	Путепровід	67	Yenakiieve urban hromada	Horlivka Raion	UA14060070100012693
Shaposhnykove	Шапошникове	27	Yenakiieve urban hromada	Horlivka Raion	UA14060070110036071
Shevchenko	Шевченко	160	Yenakiieve urban hromada	Horlivka Raion	UA14060070120077381
Rozivka	Розівка	1,469	Zhdanivka urban hromada	Horlivka Raion	UA14060090030037741
Shevchenko	Шевченко	490	Zhdanivka urban hromada	Horlivka Raion	UA14060090040089310
Bila Kamianka	Біла Кам'янка	83	Boikivske settlement hromada	Kalmiuske Raion	UA14100010020035617
Bilokrynychne	Білокриничне	99	Boikivske settlement hromada	Kalmiuske Raion	UA14100010030032328
Bohdanivka	Богданівка	577	Boikivske settlement hromada	Kalmiuske Raion	UA14100010040022246
Vershynivka	Вершинівка	37	Boikivske settlement hromada	Kalmiuske Raion	UA14100010050075553
Volia	Воля	102	Boikivske settlement hromada	Kalmiuske Raion	UA14100010060081694
Hrekovo-Oleksandrivka	Греково-Олександрівка	600	Boikivske settlement hromada	Kalmiuske Raion	UA14100010070025826
Hryhorivka	Григорівка	211	Boikivske settlement hromada	Kalmiuske Raion	UA14100010080064054
Hrintal	Грінталь	1,146	Boikivske settlement hromada	Kalmiuske Raion	UA14100010240048301
Dersove	Дерсове	377	Boikivske settlement hromada	Kalmiuske Raion	UA14100010090063273
Zaporozhets	Запорожець	297	Boikivske settlement hromada	Kalmiuske Raion	UA14100010100075568
Zernove	Зернове	206	Boikivske settlement hromada	Kalmiuske Raion	UA14100010120067471
Zelenyi Hai	Зелений Гай	118	Boikivske settlement hromada	Kalmiuske Raion	UA14100010110014687
Zori	Зорі	193	Boikivske settlement hromada	Kalmiuske Raion	UA14100010130070087
Ivanivka	Іванівка	165	Boikivske settlement hromada	Kalmiuske Raion	UA14100010140048225
Kamianuvate	Кам'янувате	515	Boikivske settlement hromada	Kalmiuske Raion	UA14100010300095728
Kaplany	Каплани	4	Boikivske settlement hromada	Kalmiuske Raion	UA14100010150083056
Konkove	Конькове	662	Boikivske settlement hromada	Kalmiuske Raion	UA14100010160058511
Kotliarevske	Котлярівське	36	Boikivske settlement hromada	Kalmiuske Raion	UA14100010170030970
Kuznetsovo-Mykhailivka	Кузнецово-Михайлівка	964	Boikivske settlement hromada	Kalmiuske Raion	UA14100010180034808
Lavrynove	Лавринове	132	Boikivske settlement hromada	Kalmiuske Raion	UA14100010190025393
Lukove	Лукове	515	Boikivske settlement hromada	Kalmiuske Raion	UA14100010200011859
Mykolaivka	Миколаївка	251	Boikivske settlement hromada	Kalmiuske Raion	UA14100010220097488
Mykhailivka	Михайлівка	606	Boikivske settlement hromada	Kalmiuske Raion	UA14100010230084234
Novooleksandrivka	Новоолександрівка	111	Boikivske settlement hromada	Kalmiuske Raion	UA14100010270098180
Oleksandrivske	Олександрівське	8	Boikivske settlement hromada	Kalmiuske Raion	UA14100010280078094
Petrivske	Петрівське	79	Boikivske settlement hromada	Kalmiuske Raion	UA14100010310011159
Rozivka	Розівка	318	Boikivske settlement hromada	Kalmiuske Raion	UA14100010320039879
Sadky	Садки	133	Boikivske settlement hromada	Kalmiuske Raion	UA14100010330084935
Samsonove	Самсонове	384	Boikivske settlement hromada	Kalmiuske Raion	UA14100010340046342
Svobodne	Свободне	776	Boikivske settlement hromada	Kalmiuske Raion	UA14100010350094197
Tavriiske	Таврійське	273	Boikivske settlement hromada	Kalmiuske Raion	UA14100010370095084
Ternivka	Тернівка	61	Boikivske settlement hromada	Kalmiuske Raion	UA14100010380077273
Shevchenko	Шевченко	200	Boikivske settlement hromada	Kalmiuske Raion	UA14100010420040007
Cherevkivske	Черевківське	77	Boikivske settlement hromada	Kalmiuske Raion	UA14100010390078793
Chyrylianske	Чирилянське	130	Boikivske settlement hromada	Kalmiuske Raion	UA14100010400019166
Chorne	Чорне	86	Boikivske settlement hromada	Kalmiuske Raion	UA14100010290072884
Chumak	Чумак	26	Boikivske settlement hromada	Kalmiuske Raion	UA14100010410023897
Maiorove	Майорове	245	Boikivske settlement hromada	Kalmiuske Raion	UA14100010210012821
Nova Marivka	Нова Мар'ївка	175	Boikivske settlement hromada	Kalmiuske Raion	UA14100010250029671
Novolaspa	Новоласпа	372	Boikivske settlement hromada	Kalmiuske Raion	UA14100010260021457
Starolaspa	Староласпа	857	Boikivske settlement hromada	Kalmiuske Raion	UA14100010360014983
Andriivka	Андріївка	670	Dokuchaievsk urban hromada	Kalmiuske Raion	UA14100030030019916
Dolia	Доля	344	Dokuchaievsk urban hromada	Kalmiuske Raion	UA14100030040082269
Luhanske	Луганське	1,489	Dokuchaievsk urban hromada	Kalmiuske Raion	UA14100030060091662
Liubivka	Любівка	537	Dokuchaievsk urban hromada	Kalmiuske Raion	UA14100030070091390
Syhnalne	Сигнальне	281	Dokuchaievsk urban hromada	Kalmiuske Raion	UA14100030080090849
Chervone	Червоне	95	Dokuchaievsk urban hromada	Kalmiuske Raion	UA14100030090069715
Kreminets	Кремінець	338	Dokuchaievsk urban hromada	Kalmiuske Raion	UA14100030050025070
Slavne	Славне	237	Dokuchaievsk urban hromada	Kalmiuske Raion	UA14160130180020228
Andriivka	Андріївка	445	Kalmiuske urban hromada	Kalmiuske Raion	UA14100050020021894
Berehove	Берегове	117	Kalmiuske urban hromada	Kalmiuske Raion	UA14100050030042686
Berestove	Берестове	47	Kalmiuske urban hromada	Kalmiuske Raion	UA14100050040055140
Vasylivka	Василівка	1,131	Kalmiuske urban hromada	Kalmiuske Raion	UA14100050050089159
Verkhokamianka	Верхокам'янка	97	Kalmiuske urban hromada	Kalmiuske Raion	UA14100050060077585
Vesele	Веселе	108	Kalmiuske urban hromada	Kalmiuske Raion	UA14100050070087106
Vyshneve	Вишневе	31	Kalmiuske urban hromada	Kalmiuske Raion	UA14100050080050671
Hlynka	Глинка	647	Kalmiuske urban hromada	Kalmiuske Raion	UA14100050090091495
Zelene	Зелене	66	Kalmiuske urban hromada	Kalmiuske Raion	UA14100050100019622
Kamiane	Кам'яне	131	Kalmiuske urban hromada	Kalmiuske Raion	UA14100050110086057
Kamianka	Кам'янка	297	Kalmiuske urban hromada	Kalmiuske Raion	UA14100050120019282
Krasnopillia	Краснопілля	605	Kalmiuske urban hromada	Kalmiuske Raion	UA14100050130085599
Kultura	Культура	94	Kalmiuske urban hromada	Kalmiuske Raion	UA14100050140079839
Kumachove	Кумачове	1,899	Kalmiuske urban hromada	Kalmiuske Raion	UA14100050150037301
Luzhky	Лужки	77	Kalmiuske urban hromada	Kalmiuske Raion	UA14100050160093132
Liubivka	Любівка	190	Kalmiuske urban hromada	Kalmiuske Raion	UA14100050170039870
Novozarivka	Новозар'ївка	1,683	Kalmiuske urban hromada	Kalmiuske Raion	UA14100050180032961
Novokaterynivka	Новокатеринівка	660	Kalmiuske urban hromada	Kalmiuske Raion	UA14100050190086312
Novomykhailivka	Новомихайлівка	50	Kalmiuske urban hromada	Kalmiuske Raion	UA14100050200068775
Pidhirne	Підгірне	323	Kalmiuske urban hromada	Kalmiuske Raion	UA14100050220024122
Prokhorivske	Прохорівське	217	Kalmiuske urban hromada	Kalmiuske Raion	UA14100050240066795
Pobieda	Побєда	726	Kalmiuske urban hromada	Kalmiuske Raion	UA14100050230029422
Rebrykove	Ребрикове	109	Kalmiuske urban hromada	Kalmiuske Raion	UA14100050250035655
Rozdolne	Роздольне	2,446	Kalmiuske urban hromada	Kalmiuske Raion	UA14100050260024364
Sontseve	Сонцеве	985	Kalmiuske urban hromada	Kalmiuske Raion	UA14100050280086993
Stakhivske	Стахівське	1,069	Kalmiuske urban hromada	Kalmiuske Raion	UA14100050210082632
Shyroke	Широке	33	Kalmiuske urban hromada	Kalmiuske Raion	UA14100050310014165
Shevchenko (Note: Located in Novokaterynivka Village Council)	Шевченко	188	Kalmiuske urban hromada	Kalmiuske Raion	UA14100050290055173
Shevchenko (Note: Located in Kumachove Village Council)	Шевченко	87	Kalmiuske urban hromada	Kalmiuske Raion	UA14100050300034617
Shmidta	Шмідта	154	Kalmiuske urban hromada	Kalmiuske Raion	UA14100050320072070
Svitlyi Luch	Світлий Луч	41	Kalmiuske urban hromada	Kalmiuske Raion	UA14100050270056715
Azov	Азов	208	Novoazovsk urban hromada	Kalmiuske Raion	UA14100070030042293
Bezimenne	Безіменне	2,645	Novoazovsk urban hromada	Kalmiuske Raion	UA14100070040071509
Bessarabka	Бессарабка	119	Novoazovsk urban hromada	Kalmiuske Raion	UA14100070050096297
Vedenske	Веденське	22	Novoazovsk urban hromada	Kalmiuske Raion	UA14100070070034007
Verkhnoshyrokivske	Верхньошироківське	279	Novoazovsk urban hromada	Kalmiuske Raion	UA14100070080016639
Vesele	Веселе	35	Novoazovsk urban hromada	Kalmiuske Raion	UA14100070090048440
Vitava	Вітава	68	Novoazovsk urban hromada	Kalmiuske Raion	UA14100070100041582
Huselnykove	Гусельникове	635	Novoazovsk urban hromada	Kalmiuske Raion	UA14100070110077135
Kachkarske	Качкарське	349	Novoazovsk urban hromada	Kalmiuske Raion	UA14100070120066996
Kozlivka	Козлівка	113	Novoazovsk urban hromada	Kalmiuske Raion	UA14100070160048432
Mytkovo-Kachkari	Митьково-Качкарі	418	Novoazovsk urban hromada	Kalmiuske Raion	UA14100070200020918
Klynkyne	Клинкине	258	Novoazovsk urban hromada	Kalmiuske Raion	UA14100070130083542
Kovske	Ковське	66	Novoazovsk urban hromada	Kalmiuske Raion	UA14100070140077636
Kozatske	Козацьке	977	Novoazovsk urban hromada	Kalmiuske Raion	UA14100070150053460
Kuznetsi	Кузнеці	26	Novoazovsk urban hromada	Kalmiuske Raion	UA14100070170036243
Kulykove	Куликове	74	Novoazovsk urban hromada	Kalmiuske Raion	UA14100070180015993
Markyne	Маркине	472	Novoazovsk urban hromada	Kalmiuske Raion	UA14100070190013423
Naberezhne	Набережне	237	Novoazovsk urban hromada	Kalmiuske Raion	UA14100070210090379
Oleksandrivske	Олександрівське	926	Novoazovsk urban hromada	Kalmiuske Raion	UA14100070220075888
Palanka	Паланка	177	Novoazovsk urban hromada	Kalmiuske Raion	UA14100070240086560
Patriotychne	Патріотичне	402	Novoazovsk urban hromada	Kalmiuske Raion	UA14100070230053742
Porokhnia	Порохня	59	Novoazovsk urban hromada	Kalmiuske Raion	UA14100070250025189
Roza	Роза	8	Novoazovsk urban hromada	Kalmiuske Raion	UA14100070270021305
Samiilove	Самійлове	568	Novoazovsk urban hromada	Kalmiuske Raion	UA14100070280039683
Samsonove	Самсонове	377	Novoazovsk urban hromada	Kalmiuske Raion	UA14100070290051156
Sosnivske	Соснівське	33	Novoazovsk urban hromada	Kalmiuske Raion	UA14100070320059583
Siedovo-Vasylivka	Сєдово-Василівка	317	Novoazovsk urban hromada	Kalmiuske Raion	UA14100070310015385
Ukrainske	Українське	43	Novoazovsk urban hromada	Kalmiuske Raion	UA14100070340020561
Kholodne	Холодне	131	Novoazovsk urban hromada	Kalmiuske Raion	UA14100070350037193
Khomutove	Хомутове	749	Novoazovsk urban hromada	Kalmiuske Raion	UA14100070360051545
Khreshchatytske	Хрещатицьке	1,235	Novoazovsk urban hromada	Kalmiuske Raion	UA14100070370050846
Shevchenko	Шевченко	233	Novoazovsk urban hromada	Kalmiuske Raion	UA14100070380024942
Shcherbak	Щербак	174	Novoazovsk urban hromada	Kalmiuske Raion	UA14100070390073093
Prymorske	Приморське	1,406	Novoazovsk urban hromada	Kalmiuske Raion	UA14100070260032560
Sakhanka	Саханка	1,086	Novoazovsk urban hromada	Kalmiuske Raion	UA14100070300011134
Uzhivka	Ужівка	135	Novoazovsk urban hromada	Kalmiuske Raion	UA14100070330022112
Frolivske	Фролівське	57	Novoazovsk urban hromada	Kalmiuske Raion	UA14100070060083003
Andriivka	Андріївка	6	Starobesheve settlement hromada	Kalmiuske Raion	UA14100090030075337
Voznesenka	Вознесенка	95	Starobesheve settlement hromada	Kalmiuske Raion	UA14100090040082819
Horbatenko	Горбатенко	67	Starobesheve settlement hromada	Kalmiuske Raion	UA14100090050023136
Zvytiazhne	Звитяжне	212	Starobesheve settlement hromada	Kalmiuske Raion	UA14100090130040123
Kamianka	Кам'янка	269	Starobesheve settlement hromada	Kalmiuske Raion	UA14100090060029982
Marianivka	Мар'янівка	1,728	Starobesheve settlement hromada	Kalmiuske Raion	UA14100090070022830
Novobesheve	Новобешеве	268	Starobesheve settlement hromada	Kalmiuske Raion	UA14100090080070728
Novoselivka	Новоселівка	546	Starobesheve settlement hromada	Kalmiuske Raion	UA14100090090087012
Obilne	Обільне	250	Starobesheve settlement hromada	Kalmiuske Raion	UA14100090100096697
Oleksandrivka	Олександрівка	25	Starobesheve settlement hromada	Kalmiuske Raion	UA14100090110055335
Osykove	Осикове	1,227	Starobesheve settlement hromada	Kalmiuske Raion	UA14100090120067680
Pishchane	Піщане	400	Starobesheve settlement hromada	Kalmiuske Raion	UA14100090140076686
Prydorozhnie	Придорожнє	596	Starobesheve settlement hromada	Kalmiuske Raion	UA14100090150074968
Sarabash	Сарабаш	1,008	Starobesheve settlement hromada	Kalmiuske Raion	UA14100090160082513
Svitle	Світле	169	Starobesheve settlement hromada	Kalmiuske Raion	UA14100090170077581
Styla	Стила	2,198	Starobesheve settlement hromada	Kalmiuske Raion	UA14100090180044000
Chumaky	Чумаки	80	Starobesheve settlement hromada	Kalmiuske Raion	UA14100090190042649
Andriivka	Андріївка	2001_POP_STATS	Andriivka rural hromada	Kramatorsk Raion	INSERT_KATO
Varvarivka	Варварівка	2001_POP_STATS	Andriivka rural hromada	Kramatorsk Raion	INSERT_KATO
Novoandriivka	Новоандріївка	2001_POP_STATS	Andriivka rural hromada	Kramatorsk Raion	INSERT_KATO
Rohanske	Роганське	2001_POP_STATS	Andriivka rural hromada	Kramatorsk Raion	INSERT_KATO
Serhiivka	Сергіївка	2001_POP_STATS	Andriivka rural hromada	Kramatorsk Raion	INSERT_KATO
Ivanivka	Іванівка	2001_POP_STATS	Cherkaske settlement hromada	Kramatorsk Raion	INSERT_KATO
Maidan	Майдан	2001_POP_STATS	Cherkaske settlement hromada	Kramatorsk Raion	INSERT_KATO
Maiachka	Маячка	2001_POP_STATS	Cherkaske settlement hromada	Kramatorsk Raion	INSERT_KATO
Novomykolaivka	Новомиколаївка	2001_POP_STATS	Cherkaske settlement hromada	Kramatorsk Raion	INSERT_KATO
Novoselivka	Новоселівка	2001_POP_STATS	Cherkaske settlement hromada	Kramatorsk Raion	INSERT_KATO
Oleksandrivka	Олександрівка	2001_POP_STATS	Cherkaske settlement hromada	Kramatorsk Raion	INSERT_KATO
Prylisne	Прилісне	2001_POP_STATS	Cherkaske settlement hromada	Kramatorsk Raion	INSERT_KATO
Pryvillia	Привілля	2001_POP_STATS	Cherkaske settlement hromada	Kramatorsk Raion	INSERT_KATO
Troitske	Троїцьке	2001_POP_STATS	Cherkaske settlement hromada	Kramatorsk Raion	INSERT_KATO
Shnurky	Шнурки	2001_POP_STATS	Cherkaske settlement hromada	Kramatorsk Raion	INSERT_KATO
Druzhkivske	Дружківське	2001_POP_STATS	Druzhkivka urban hromada	Kramatorsk Raion	INSERT_KATO
Kindrativka	Кіндратівка	2001_POP_STATS	Druzhkivka urban hromada	Kramatorsk Raion	INSERT_KATO
Krasnyi Kut	Красний Кут	2001_POP_STATS	Druzhkivka urban hromada	Kramatorsk Raion	INSERT_KATO
Kurtivka	Куртівка	2001_POP_STATS	Druzhkivka urban hromada	Kramatorsk Raion	INSERT_KATO
Mykolaipillia	Миколайпілля	2001_POP_STATS	Druzhkivka urban hromada	Kramatorsk Raion	INSERT_KATO
Novopavlivka	Новопавлівка	2001_POP_STATS	Druzhkivka urban hromada	Kramatorsk Raion	INSERT_KATO
Osykove	Осикове	2001_POP_STATS	Druzhkivka urban hromada	Kramatorsk Raion	INSERT_KATO
Pavlivka	Павлівка	2001_POP_STATS	Druzhkivka urban hromada	Kramatorsk Raion	INSERT_KATO
Petrivka	Петрівка	2001_POP_STATS	Druzhkivka urban hromada	Kramatorsk Raion	INSERT_KATO
Raiske	Райське	2001_POP_STATS	Druzhkivka urban hromada	Kramatorsk Raion	INSERT_KATO
Sofiivka	Софіївка	2001_POP_STATS	Druzhkivka urban hromada	Kramatorsk Raion	INSERT_KATO
Toretske	Торецьке	2001_POP_STATS	Druzhkivka urban hromada	Kramatorsk Raion	INSERT_KATO
Torske	Торське	2001_POP_STATS	Druzhkivka urban hromada	Kramatorsk Raion	INSERT_KATO
Berezivka	Березівка	2001_POP_STATS	Illinivka rural hromada	Kramatorsk Raion	INSERT_KATO
Hnativka	Гнатівка	2001_POP_STATS	Illinivka rural hromada	Kramatorsk Raion	INSERT_KATO
Illinivka	Іллінівка	2001_POP_STATS	Illinivka rural hromada	Kramatorsk Raion	INSERT_KATO
Kalynove	Калинове	2001_POP_STATS	Illinivka rural hromada	Kramatorsk Raion	INSERT_KATO
Katerynivka	Катеринівка	2001_POP_STATS	Illinivka rural hromada	Kramatorsk Raion	INSERT_KATO
Nova Poltavka	Нова Полтавка	2001_POP_STATS	Illinivka rural hromada	Kramatorsk Raion	INSERT_KATO
Novoolenivka	Новооленівка	2001_POP_STATS	Illinivka rural hromada	Kramatorsk Raion	INSERT_KATO
Oleksandro-Kalynove	Олександро-Калинове	2001_POP_STATS	Illinivka rural hromada	Kramatorsk Raion	INSERT_KATO
Oleksandropil	Олександропіль	2001_POP_STATS	Illinivka rural hromada	Kramatorsk Raion	INSERT_KATO
Pleshchiivka	Плещіївка	2001_POP_STATS	Illinivka rural hromada	Kramatorsk Raion	INSERT_KATO
Poltavka	Полтавка	2001_POP_STATS	Illinivka rural hromada	Kramatorsk Raion	INSERT_KATO
Popiv Yar	Попів Яр	2001_POP_STATS	Illinivka rural hromada	Kramatorsk Raion	INSERT_KATO
Romanivka	Романівка	2001_POP_STATS	Illinivka rural hromada	Kramatorsk Raion	INSERT_KATO
Rusyn Yar	Русин Яр	2001_POP_STATS	Illinivka rural hromada	Kramatorsk Raion	INSERT_KATO
Stara Mykolaivka	Стара Миколаївка	2001_POP_STATS	Illinivka rural hromada	Kramatorsk Raion	INSERT_KATO
Stepanivka	Степанівка	2001_POP_STATS	Illinivka rural hromada	Kramatorsk Raion	INSERT_KATO
Tarasivka	Тарасівка	2001_POP_STATS	Illinivka rural hromada	Kramatorsk Raion	INSERT_KATO
Vodiane Druhe	Водяне Друге	2001_POP_STATS	Illinivka rural hromada	Kramatorsk Raion	INSERT_KATO
Yablunivka	Яблунівка	2001_POP_STATS	Illinivka rural hromada	Kramatorsk Raion	INSERT_KATO
Zelene Pole	Зелене Поле	2001_POP_STATS	Illinivka rural hromada	Kramatorsk Raion	INSERT_KATO
Bila Hora	Біла Гора	2001_POP_STATS	Kostiantynivka urban hromada	Kramatorsk Raion	INSERT_KATO
Bilokuzmynivka	Білокузьминівка	2001_POP_STATS	Kostiantynivka urban hromada	Kramatorsk Raion	INSERT_KATO
Viroliubivka	Віролюбівка	2001_POP_STATS	Kostiantynivka urban hromada	Kramatorsk Raion	INSERT_KATO
Dyliivka	Диліївка	2001_POP_STATS	Kostiantynivka urban hromada	Kramatorsk Raion	INSERT_KATO
Ivanopillia	Іванопілля	2001_POP_STATS	Kostiantynivka urban hromada	Kramatorsk Raion	INSERT_KATO
Izhevka	Іжевка	2001_POP_STATS	Kostiantynivka urban hromada	Kramatorsk Raion	INSERT_KATO
Klynove	Клинове	2001_POP_STATS	Kostiantynivka urban hromada	Kramatorsk Raion	INSERT_KATO
Maiske	Майське	2001_POP_STATS	Kostiantynivka urban hromada	Kramatorsk Raion	INSERT_KATO
Markove	Маркове	2001_POP_STATS	Kostiantynivka urban hromada	Kramatorsk Raion	INSERT_KATO
Mykolaivka	Миколаївка	2001_POP_STATS	Kostiantynivka urban hromada	Kramatorsk Raion	INSERT_KATO
Nelipivka	Неліпівка	2001_POP_STATS	Kostiantynivka urban hromada	Kramatorsk Raion	INSERT_KATO
Novomarkove	Новомаркове	2001_POP_STATS	Kostiantynivka urban hromada	Kramatorsk Raion	INSERT_KATO
Oleksandro-Shultyne	Олександро-Шультине	2001_POP_STATS	Kostiantynivka urban hromada	Kramatorsk Raion	INSERT_KATO
Podilske	Подільське	2001_POP_STATS	Kostiantynivka urban hromada	Kramatorsk Raion	INSERT_KATO
Popasne	Попасне	2001_POP_STATS	Kostiantynivka urban hromada	Kramatorsk Raion	INSERT_KATO
Predtechyne	Предтечине	2001_POP_STATS	Kostiantynivka urban hromada	Kramatorsk Raion	INSERT_KATO
Stupochky	Ступочки	2001_POP_STATS	Kostiantynivka urban hromada	Kramatorsk Raion	INSERT_KATO
Fedorivka	Федорівка	2001_POP_STATS	Kostiantynivka urban hromada	Kramatorsk Raion	INSERT_KATO
Ashurkove	Ашуркове	2001_POP_STATS	Kramatorsk urban hromada	Kramatorsk Raion	INSERT_KATO
Vasylivska Pustosh	Василівська Пустош	2001_POP_STATS	Kramatorsk urban hromada	Kramatorsk Raion	INSERT_KATO
Dmytrivka	Дмитрівка	2001_POP_STATS	Kramatorsk urban hromada	Kramatorsk Raion	INSERT_KATO
Pryvillia	Привілля	2001_POP_STATS	Kramatorsk urban hromada	Kramatorsk Raion	INSERT_KATO
Semenivka	Семенівка	2001_POP_STATS	Kramatorsk urban hromada	Kramatorsk Raion	INSERT_KATO
Brusivka	Брусівка	2001_POP_STATS	Lyman urban hromada	Kramatorsk Raion	INSERT_KATO
Vovchyi Yar	Вовчий Яр	2001_POP_STATS	Lyman urban hromada	Kramatorsk Raion	INSERT_KATO
Derylove	Дерилове	2001_POP_STATS	Lyman urban hromada	Kramatorsk Raion	INSERT_KATO
Dibrova	Діброва	2001_POP_STATS	Lyman urban hromada	Kramatorsk Raion	INSERT_KATO
Zakitne	Закітне	2001_POP_STATS	Lyman urban hromada	Kramatorsk Raion	INSERT_KATO
Zelena Dolyna	Зелена Долина	2001_POP_STATS	Lyman urban hromada	Kramatorsk Raion	INSERT_KATO
Ivanivka	Іванівка	2001_POP_STATS	Lyman urban hromada	Kramatorsk Raion	INSERT_KATO
Kalenyky	Каленики	2001_POP_STATS	Lyman urban hromada	Kramatorsk Raion	INSERT_KATO
Karpivka	Карпівка	2001_POP_STATS	Lyman urban hromada	Kramatorsk Raion	INSERT_KATO
Katerynivka	Катеринівка	2001_POP_STATS	Lyman urban hromada	Kramatorsk Raion	INSERT_KATO
Kolodiazi	Колодязі	2001_POP_STATS	Lyman urban hromada	Kramatorsk Raion	INSERT_KATO
Korovii Yar	Коровій Яр	2001_POP_STATS	Lyman urban hromada	Kramatorsk Raion	INSERT_KATO
Kryva Luka	Крива Лука	2001_POP_STATS	Lyman urban hromada	Kramatorsk Raion	INSERT_KATO
Krymky	Кримки	2001_POP_STATS	Lyman urban hromada	Kramatorsk Raion	INSERT_KATO
Lypove	Липове	2001_POP_STATS	Lyman urban hromada	Kramatorsk Raion	INSERT_KATO
Lozove	Лозове	2001_POP_STATS	Lyman urban hromada	Kramatorsk Raion	INSERT_KATO
Novomykhailivka	Новомихайлівка	2001_POP_STATS	Lyman urban hromada	Kramatorsk Raion	INSERT_KATO
Novosadove	Новосадове	2001_POP_STATS	Lyman urban hromada	Kramatorsk Raion	INSERT_KATO
Ozerne	Озерне	2001_POP_STATS	Lyman urban hromada	Kramatorsk Raion	INSERT_KATO
Oleksandrivka	Олександрівка	2001_POP_STATS	Lyman urban hromada	Kramatorsk Raion	INSERT_KATO
Ridkodub	Рідкодуб	2001_POP_STATS	Lyman urban hromada	Kramatorsk Raion	INSERT_KATO
Rubtsi	Рубці	2001_POP_STATS	Lyman urban hromada	Kramatorsk Raion	INSERT_KATO
Serednie	Середнє	2001_POP_STATS	Lyman urban hromada	Kramatorsk Raion	INSERT_KATO
Staryi Karavan	Старий Караван	2001_POP_STATS	Lyman urban hromada	Kramatorsk Raion	INSERT_KATO
Terny	Терни	2001_POP_STATS	Lyman urban hromada	Kramatorsk Raion	INSERT_KATO
Torske	Торське	2001_POP_STATS	Lyman urban hromada	Kramatorsk Raion	INSERT_KATO
Shandryholove	Шандриголове	2001_POP_STATS	Lyman urban hromada	Kramatorsk Raion	INSERT_KATO
Shchurove	Щурове	2001_POP_STATS	Lyman urban hromada	Kramatorsk Raion	INSERT_KATO
Yampolivka	Ямполівка	2001_POP_STATS	Lyman urban hromada	Kramatorsk Raion	INSERT_KATO
Yatskivka	Яцьківка	2001_POP_STATS	Lyman urban hromada	Kramatorsk Raion	INSERT_KATO
Karpivka	Карпівка	2001_POP_STATS	Mykolaivka urban hromada	Kramatorsk Raion	INSERT_KATO
Seleznivka	Селезнівка	2001_POP_STATS	Mykolaivka urban hromada	Kramatorsk Raion	INSERT_KATO
Malynivka	Малинівка	2001_POP_STATS	Mykolaivka urban hromada	Kramatorsk Raion	INSERT_KATO
Vasiutynske	Васютинське	2001_POP_STATS	Mykolaivka urban hromada	Kramatorsk Raion	INSERT_KATO
Nykonorivka	Никонорівка	2001_POP_STATS	Mykolaivka urban hromada	Kramatorsk Raion	INSERT_KATO
Orikhuvatka	Оріхуватка	2001_POP_STATS	Mykolaivka urban hromada	Kramatorsk Raion	INSERT_KATO
Tykhonivka	Тихонівка	2001_POP_STATS	Mykolaivka urban hromada	Kramatorsk Raion	INSERT_KATO
Yurkivka	Юрківка	2001_POP_STATS	Mykolaivka urban hromada	Kramatorsk Raion	INSERT_KATO
Rai-Oleksandrivka	Рай-Олександрівка	2001_POP_STATS	Mykolaivka urban hromada	Kramatorsk Raion	INSERT_KATO
Pyskunivka	Пискунівка	2001_POP_STATS	Mykolaivka urban hromada	Kramatorsk Raion	INSERT_KATO
Starodubivka	Стародубівка	2001_POP_STATS	Mykolaivka urban hromada	Kramatorsk Raion	INSERT_KATO
Pershomariivka	Першомар'ївка	2001_POP_STATS	Mykolaivka urban hromada	Kramatorsk Raion	INSERT_KATO
Vesela Hora	Весела Гора	2001_POP_STATS	Novodonetske settlement hromada	Kramatorsk Raion	INSERT_KATO
Iverske	Іверське	2001_POP_STATS	Novodonetske settlement hromada	Kramatorsk Raion	INSERT_KATO
Katerynivka	Катеринівка	2001_POP_STATS	Novodonetske settlement hromada	Kramatorsk Raion	INSERT_KATO
Krynytsi	Криниці	2001_POP_STATS	Novodonetske settlement hromada	Kramatorsk Raion	INSERT_KATO
Kurytsyne	Курицине	2001_POP_STATS	Novodonetske settlement hromada	Kramatorsk Raion	INSERT_KATO
Kuroidivka	Куроїдівка	2001_POP_STATS	Novodonetske settlement hromada	Kramatorsk Raion	INSERT_KATO
Novoiverske	Новоіверське	2001_POP_STATS	Novodonetske settlement hromada	Kramatorsk Raion	INSERT_KATO
Novopavlivka	Новопавлівка	2001_POP_STATS	Novodonetske settlement hromada	Kramatorsk Raion	INSERT_KATO
Novopetrivka	Новопетрівка	2001_POP_STATS	Novodonetske settlement hromada	Kramatorsk Raion	INSERT_KATO
Novosamarske	Новосамарське	2001_POP_STATS	Novodonetske settlement hromada	Kramatorsk Raion	INSERT_KATO
Novoserhiivka	Новосергіївка	2001_POP_STATS	Novodonetske settlement hromada	Kramatorsk Raion	INSERT_KATO
Samiilivka	Самійлівка	2001_POP_STATS	Novodonetske settlement hromada	Kramatorsk Raion	INSERT_KATO
Spasko-Mykhailivka	Спасько-Михайлівка	2001_POP_STATS	Novodonetske settlement hromada	Kramatorsk Raion	INSERT_KATO
Stepanivka	Степанівка	2001_POP_STATS	Novodonetske settlement hromada	Kramatorsk Raion	INSERT_KATO
Fedorivka	Федорівка	2001_POP_STATS	Novodonetske settlement hromada	Kramatorsk Raion	INSERT_KATO
Shevchenko	Шевченко	2001_POP_STATS	Novodonetske settlement hromada	Kramatorsk Raion	INSERT_KATO
Shostakivka	Шостаківка	2001_POP_STATS	Novodonetske settlement hromada	Kramatorsk Raion	INSERT_KATO
Bezzabotivka	Беззаботівка	2001_POP_STATS	Oleksandrivka settlement hromada	Kramatorsk Raion	INSERT_KATO
Buzynivka	Бузинівка	2001_POP_STATS	Oleksandrivka settlement hromada	Kramatorsk Raion	INSERT_KATO
Varvarivka	Варварівка	2001_POP_STATS	Oleksandrivka settlement hromada	Kramatorsk Raion	INSERT_KATO
Vysokopillia	Високопілля	2001_POP_STATS	Oleksandrivka settlement hromada	Kramatorsk Raion	INSERT_KATO
Holubivka	Голубівка	2001_POP_STATS	Oleksandrivka settlement hromada	Kramatorsk Raion	INSERT_KATO
Hromova Balka	Громова Балка	2001_POP_STATS	Oleksandrivka settlement hromada	Kramatorsk Raion	INSERT_KATO
Dmytro-Dariivka	Дмитро-Дар'ївка	2001_POP_STATS	Oleksandrivka settlement hromada	Kramatorsk Raion	INSERT_KATO
Dmytrokolyne	Дмитроколине	2001_POP_STATS	Oleksandrivka settlement hromada	Kramatorsk Raion	INSERT_KATO
Yelyzavetivka	Єлизаветівка	2001_POP_STATS	Oleksandrivka settlement hromada	Kramatorsk Raion	INSERT_KATO
Zaparo-Mariivka	Запаро-Мар'ївка	2001_POP_STATS	Oleksandrivka settlement hromada	Kramatorsk Raion	INSERT_KATO
Zelene	Зелене	2001_POP_STATS	Oleksandrivka settlement hromada	Kramatorsk Raion	INSERT_KATO
Zelenyi Brid	Зелений Брід	2001_POP_STATS	Oleksandrivka settlement hromada	Kramatorsk Raion	INSERT_KATO
Znamenivka	Знаменівка	2001_POP_STATS	Oleksandrivka settlement hromada	Kramatorsk Raion	INSERT_KATO
Karpivka	Карпівка	2001_POP_STATS	Oleksandrivka settlement hromada	Kramatorsk Raion	INSERT_KATO
Levadne	Левадне	2001_POP_STATS	Oleksandrivka settlement hromada	Kramatorsk Raion	INSERT_KATO
Lvivka	Львівка	2001_POP_STATS	Oleksandrivka settlement hromada	Kramatorsk Raion	INSERT_KATO
Mariivka	Мар'ївка	2001_POP_STATS	Oleksandrivka settlement hromada	Kramatorsk Raion	INSERT_KATO
Mykilske	Микільське	2001_POP_STATS	Oleksandrivka settlement hromada	Kramatorsk Raion	INSERT_KATO
Myrna Dolyna	Мирна Долина	2001_POP_STATS	Oleksandrivka settlement hromada	Kramatorsk Raion	INSERT_KATO
Mykhailivka	Михайлівка	2001_POP_STATS	Oleksandrivka settlement hromada	Kramatorsk Raion	INSERT_KATO
Nekremenne	Некременне	2001_POP_STATS	Oleksandrivka settlement hromada	Kramatorsk Raion	INSERT_KATO
Novyi Kavkaz	Новий Кавказ	2001_POP_STATS	Oleksandrivka settlement hromada	Kramatorsk Raion	INSERT_KATO
Novoandriivka	Новоандріївка	2001_POP_STATS	Oleksandrivka settlement hromada	Kramatorsk Raion	INSERT_KATO
Novobakhmetieve	Новобахметьєве	2001_POP_STATS	Oleksandrivka settlement hromada	Kramatorsk Raion	INSERT_KATO
Novoznamenivka	Новознаменівка	2001_POP_STATS	Oleksandrivka settlement hromada	Kramatorsk Raion	INSERT_KATO
Novooleksandrivka	Новоолександрівка	2001_POP_STATS	Oleksandrivka settlement hromada	Kramatorsk Raion	INSERT_KATO
Novopoltavka	Новополтавка	2001_POP_STATS	Oleksandrivka settlement hromada	Kramatorsk Raion	INSERT_KATO
Novopryhozhe	Новопригоже	2001_POP_STATS	Oleksandrivka settlement hromada	Kramatorsk Raion	INSERT_KATO
Novostepanivka	Новостепанівка	2001_POP_STATS	Oleksandrivka settlement hromada	Kramatorsk Raion	INSERT_KATO
Ocheretyne	Очеретине	2001_POP_STATS	Oleksandrivka settlement hromada	Kramatorsk Raion	INSERT_KATO
Pasichne	Пасічне	2001_POP_STATS	Oleksandrivka settlement hromada	Kramatorsk Raion	INSERT_KATO
Petrivka Druha	Петрівка Друга	2001_POP_STATS	Oleksandrivka settlement hromada	Kramatorsk Raion	INSERT_KATO
Petrivka Persha	Петрівка Перша	2001_POP_STATS	Oleksandrivka settlement hromada	Kramatorsk Raion	INSERT_KATO
Rozdollia	Роздолля	2001_POP_STATS	Oleksandrivka settlement hromada	Kramatorsk Raion	INSERT_KATO
Sofiivka	Софіївка	2001_POP_STATS	Oleksandrivka settlement hromada	Kramatorsk Raion	INSERT_KATO
Sofiino-Lyman	Софіїно-Лиман	2001_POP_STATS	Oleksandrivka settlement hromada	Kramatorsk Raion	INSERT_KATO
Starovarvarivka	Староварварівка	2001_POP_STATS	Oleksandrivka settlement hromada	Kramatorsk Raion	INSERT_KATO
Shavrove	Шаврове	2001_POP_STATS	Oleksandrivka settlement hromada	Kramatorsk Raion	INSERT_KATO
Yakovlivka	Яковлівка	2001_POP_STATS	Oleksandrivka settlement hromada	Kramatorsk Raion	INSERT_KATO
Zoloti Prudy	Золоті Пруди	2001_POP_STATS	Oleksandrivka settlement hromada	Kramatorsk Raion	INSERT_KATO
Nadiia	Надія	2001_POP_STATS	Oleksandrivka settlement hromada	Kramatorsk Raion	INSERT_KATO
Adamivka	Адамівка	2001_POP_STATS	Sviatohirsk urban hromada	Kramatorsk Raion	INSERT_KATO
Bohorodychne	Богородичне	2001_POP_STATS	Sviatohirsk urban hromada	Kramatorsk Raion	INSERT_KATO
Hlyboka Makatykha	Глибока Макатиха	2001_POP_STATS	Sviatohirsk urban hromada	Kramatorsk Raion	INSERT_KATO
Dolyna	Долина	2001_POP_STATS	Sviatohirsk urban hromada	Kramatorsk Raion	INSERT_KATO
Krasnopillia	Краснопілля	2001_POP_STATS	Sviatohirsk urban hromada	Kramatorsk Raion	INSERT_KATO
Mazanivka	Мазанівка	2001_POP_STATS	Sviatohirsk urban hromada	Kramatorsk Raion	INSERT_KATO
Maiaky	Маяки	2001_POP_STATS	Sviatohirsk urban hromada	Kramatorsk Raion	INSERT_KATO
Mykilske	Микільське	2001_POP_STATS	Sviatohirsk urban hromada	Kramatorsk Raion	INSERT_KATO
Pryshyb	Пришиб	2001_POP_STATS	Sviatohirsk urban hromada	Kramatorsk Raion	INSERT_KATO
Sydorove	Сидорове	2001_POP_STATS	Sviatohirsk urban hromada	Kramatorsk Raion	INSERT_KATO
Tetianivka	Тетянівка	2001_POP_STATS	Sviatohirsk urban hromada	Kramatorsk Raion	INSERT_KATO
Khrestyshche	Хрестище	2001_POP_STATS	Sviatohirsk urban hromada	Kramatorsk Raion	INSERT_KATO
Torets	Торець	2001_POP_STATS	Sloviansk urban hromada	Kramatorsk Raion	INSERT_KATO
Kalchyk	Кальчик	2001_POP_STATS	Kalchyk rural hromada	Mariupol Raion	INSERT_KATO
Afiny	Афіни	2001_POP_STATS	Kalchyk rural hromada	Mariupol Raion	INSERT_KATO
Aslanove	Асланове	2001_POP_STATS	Kalchyk rural hromada	Mariupol Raion	INSERT_KATO
Vodiane	Водяне	2001_POP_STATS	Kalchyk rural hromada	Mariupol Raion	INSERT_KATO
Hranitne	Гранітне	2001_POP_STATS	Kalchyk rural hromada	Mariupol Raion	INSERT_KATO
Kasianivka	Касянівка	2001_POP_STATS	Kalchyk rural hromada	Mariupol Raion	INSERT_KATO
Katerynivka	Катеринівка	2001_POP_STATS	Kalchyk rural hromada	Mariupol Raion	INSERT_KATO
Kelerivka	Келерівка	2001_POP_STATS	Kalchyk rural hromada	Mariupol Raion	INSERT_KATO
Kyrylivka	Кирилівка	2001_POP_STATS	Kalchyk rural hromada	Mariupol Raion	INSERT_KATO
Kliuchove	Ключове	2001_POP_STATS	Kalchyk rural hromada	Mariupol Raion	INSERT_KATO
Kremenivka	Кременівка	2001_POP_STATS	Kalchyk rural hromada	Mariupol Raion	INSERT_KATO
Makedonivka	Македонівка	2001_POP_STATS	Kalchyk rural hromada	Mariupol Raion	INSERT_KATO
Maloianysol	Малоянисоль	2001_POP_STATS	Kalchyk rural hromada	Mariupol Raion	INSERT_KATO
Pryovrazhne	Приовражне	2001_POP_STATS	Kalchyk rural hromada	Mariupol Raion	INSERT_KATO
Truzhenka	Труженка	2001_POP_STATS	Kalchyk rural hromada	Mariupol Raion	INSERT_KATO
Khersones	Херсонес	2001_POP_STATS	Kalchyk rural hromada	Mariupol Raion	INSERT_KATO
Azovske	Азовське	2001_POP_STATS	Manhush settlement hromada	Mariupol Raion	INSERT_KATO
Babakh-Tarama	Бабах-Тарама	2001_POP_STATS	Manhush settlement hromada	Mariupol Raion	INSERT_KATO
Bilosaraiska Kosa	Білосарайська Коса	2001_POP_STATS	Manhush settlement hromada	Mariupol Raion	INSERT_KATO
Buriakova Balka	Бурякова Балка	2001_POP_STATS	Manhush settlement hromada	Mariupol Raion	INSERT_KATO
Hlyboke	Глибоке	2001_POP_STATS	Manhush settlement hromada	Mariupol Raion	INSERT_KATO
Demianivka	Дем'янівка	2001_POP_STATS	Manhush settlement hromada	Mariupol Raion	INSERT_KATO
Zakharivka	Захарівка	2001_POP_STATS	Manhush settlement hromada	Mariupol Raion	INSERT_KATO
Komyshuvate	Комишувате	2001_POP_STATS	Manhush settlement hromada	Mariupol Raion	INSERT_KATO
Melekine	Мелекіне	2001_POP_STATS	Manhush settlement hromada	Mariupol Raion	INSERT_KATO
Ohorodnie	Огороднє	2001_POP_STATS	Manhush settlement hromada	Mariupol Raion	INSERT_KATO
Portivske	Портівське	2001_POP_STATS	Manhush settlement hromada	Mariupol Raion	INSERT_KATO
Starodubivka	Стародубівка	2001_POP_STATS	Manhush settlement hromada	Mariupol Raion	INSERT_KATO
Ukrainka	Українка	2001_POP_STATS	Manhush settlement hromada	Mariupol Raion	INSERT_KATO
Urzuf	Урзуф	2001_POP_STATS	Manhush settlement hromada	Mariupol Raion	INSERT_KATO
Yuriivka	Юріївка	2001_POP_STATS	Manhush settlement hromada	Mariupol Raion	INSERT_KATO
Ahrobaza	Агробаза	2001_POP_STATS	Mariupol urban hromada	Mariupol Raion	INSERT_KATO
Berdianske	Бердянське	2001_POP_STATS	Mariupol urban hromada	Mariupol Raion	INSERT_KATO
Pokrovske	Покровське	2001_POP_STATS	Mariupol urban hromada	Mariupol Raion	INSERT_KATO
Pryazovske	Приазовське	2001_POP_STATS	Mariupol urban hromada	Mariupol Raion	INSERT_KATO
Prymiske	Приміське	2001_POP_STATS	Mariupol urban hromada	Mariupol Raion	INSERT_KATO
Chervone	Червоне	2001_POP_STATS	Mariupol urban hromada	Mariupol Raion	INSERT_KATO
Shevchenko	Шевченко	2001_POP_STATS	Mariupol urban hromada	Mariupol Raion	INSERT_KATO
Shyroka Balka	Широка Балка	2001_POP_STATS	Mariupol urban hromada	Mariupol Raion	INSERT_KATO
Domakha	Домаха	2001_POP_STATS	Nikolske settlement hromada	Mariupol Raion	INSERT_KATO
Sviato-Pokrovske	Свято-Покровське	2001_POP_STATS	Nikolske settlement hromada	Mariupol Raion	INSERT_KATO
Vesele	Веселе	2001_POP_STATS	Nikolske settlement hromada	Mariupol Raion	INSERT_KATO
Zelenyi Yar	Зелений Яр	2001_POP_STATS	Nikolske settlement hromada	Mariupol Raion	INSERT_KATO
Kalchynivka	Кальчинівка	2001_POP_STATS	Nikolske settlement hromada	Mariupol Raion	INSERT_KATO
Krynychne	Криничне	2001_POP_STATS	Nikolske settlement hromada	Mariupol Raion	INSERT_KATO
Ksenivka	Ксенівка	2001_POP_STATS	Nikolske settlement hromada	Mariupol Raion	INSERT_KATO
Luhove	Лугове	2001_POP_STATS	Nikolske settlement hromada	Mariupol Raion	INSERT_KATO
Malynivka	Малинівка	2001_POP_STATS	Nikolske settlement hromada	Mariupol Raion	INSERT_KATO
Nazarivka	Назарівка	2001_POP_STATS	Nikolske settlement hromada	Mariupol Raion	INSERT_KATO
Novohryhorivka	Новогригорівка	2001_POP_STATS	Nikolske settlement hromada	Mariupol Raion	INSERT_KATO
Yamburh	Ямбург	2001_POP_STATS	Nikolske settlement hromada	Mariupol Raion	INSERT_KATO
Novoromanivka	Новороманівка	2001_POP_STATS	Nikolske settlement hromada	Mariupol Raion	INSERT_KATO
Novoianysol	Новоянисоль	2001_POP_STATS	Nikolske settlement hromada	Mariupol Raion	INSERT_KATO
Pannivka	Паннівка	2001_POP_STATS	Nikolske settlement hromada	Mariupol Raion	INSERT_KATO
Stepove	Степове	2001_POP_STATS	Nikolske settlement hromada	Mariupol Raion	INSERT_KATO
Sadove	Садове	2001_POP_STATS	Nikolske settlement hromada	Mariupol Raion	INSERT_KATO
Berhtal	Бергталь	2001_POP_STATS	Nikolske settlement hromada	Mariupol Raion	INSERT_KATO
Serhiivka	Сергіївка	2001_POP_STATS	Nikolske settlement hromada	Mariupol Raion	INSERT_KATO
Suzhenka	Суженка	2001_POP_STATS	Nikolske settlement hromada	Mariupol Raion	INSERT_KATO
Temriuk	Темрюк	2001_POP_STATS	Nikolske settlement hromada	Mariupol Raion	INSERT_KATO
Topolyne	Тополине	2001_POP_STATS	Nikolske settlement hromada	Mariupol Raion	INSERT_KATO
Ukrainka	Українка	2001_POP_STATS	Nikolske settlement hromada	Mariupol Raion	INSERT_KATO
Fedorivka	Федорівка	2001_POP_STATS	Nikolske settlement hromada	Mariupol Raion	INSERT_KATO
Shevchenko	Шевченко	2001_POP_STATS	Nikolske settlement hromada	Mariupol Raion	INSERT_KATO
Berdianske	Бердянське	2001_POP_STATS	Sartana settlement hromada	Mariupol Raion	INSERT_KATO
Vodiane	Водяне	2001_POP_STATS	Sartana settlement hromada	Mariupol Raion	INSERT_KATO
Hnutove	Гнутове	2001_POP_STATS	Sartana settlement hromada	Mariupol Raion	INSERT_KATO
Zaichenko	Заїченко	2001_POP_STATS	Sartana settlement hromada	Mariupol Raion	INSERT_KATO
Lebedynske	Лебединське	2001_POP_STATS	Sartana settlement hromada	Mariupol Raion	INSERT_KATO
Orlovske	Орловське	2001_POP_STATS	Sartana settlement hromada	Mariupol Raion	INSERT_KATO
Pavlopil	Павлопіль	2001_POP_STATS	Sartana settlement hromada	Mariupol Raion	INSERT_KATO
Kalmiuske	Кальміуське	2001_POP_STATS	Sartana settlement hromada	Mariupol Raion	INSERT_KATO
Pikuzy	Пікузи	2001_POP_STATS	Sartana settlement hromada	Mariupol Raion	INSERT_KATO
Sopyne	Сопине	2001_POP_STATS	Sartana settlement hromada	Mariupol Raion	INSERT_KATO
Fedorivka	Федорівка	2001_POP_STATS	Sartana settlement hromada	Mariupol Raion	INSERT_KATO
Chermalyk	Чермалик	2001_POP_STATS	Sartana settlement hromada	Mariupol Raion	INSERT_KATO
Chernenko	Черненко	2001_POP_STATS	Sartana settlement hromada	Mariupol Raion	INSERT_KATO
Shyrokyne	Широкине	2001_POP_STATS	Sartana settlement hromada	Mariupol Raion	INSERT_KATO
Opytne	Опитне	2001_POP_STATS	Avdiivka urban hromada	Pokrovsk Raion	INSERT_KATO
Blahodat	Благодать	2001_POP_STATS	Bilozerske urban hromada	Pokrovsk Raion	INSERT_KATO
Vesele Pole	Веселе Поле	2001_POP_STATS	Bilozerske urban hromada	Pokrovsk Raion	INSERT_KATO
Vesna	Весна	2001_POP_STATS	Bilozerske urban hromada	Pokrovsk Raion	INSERT_KATO
Novovodiane	Нововодяне	2001_POP_STATS	Bilozerske urban hromada	Pokrovsk Raion	INSERT_KATO
Myrove	Мирове	2001_POP_STATS	Bilozerske urban hromada	Pokrovsk Raion	INSERT_KATO
Balahan	Балаган	2001_POP_STATS	Hrodivka settlement hromada	Pokrovsk Raion	INSERT_KATO
Baranivka	Баранівка	2001_POP_STATS	Hrodivka settlement hromada	Pokrovsk Raion	INSERT_KATO
Ivanivka	Іванівка	2001_POP_STATS	Hrodivka settlement hromada	Pokrovsk Raion	INSERT_KATO
Kozatske	Козацьке	2001_POP_STATS	Hrodivka settlement hromada	Pokrovsk Raion	INSERT_KATO
Krasnyi Yar	Красний Яр	2001_POP_STATS	Hrodivka settlement hromada	Pokrovsk Raion	INSERT_KATO
Krutyi Yar	Крутий Яр	2001_POP_STATS	Hrodivka settlement hromada	Pokrovsk Raion	INSERT_KATO
Lysychne	Лисичне	2001_POP_STATS	Hrodivka settlement hromada	Pokrovsk Raion	INSERT_KATO
Malynivka	Малинівка	2001_POP_STATS	Hrodivka settlement hromada	Pokrovsk Raion	INSERT_KATO
Mykolaivka (Note: Located in Novoekonomichne starosta okruh, a subdivision of Hrodivka settlement hromada)	Миколаївка	2001_POP_STATS	Hrodivka settlement hromada	Pokrovsk Raion	INSERT_KATO
Mykolaivka	Миколаївка	2001_POP_STATS	Hrodivka settlement hromada	Pokrovsk Raion	INSERT_KATO
Myrne	Мирне	2001_POP_STATS	Hrodivka settlement hromada	Pokrovsk Raion	INSERT_KATO
Myroliubivka	Миролюбівка	2001_POP_STATS	Hrodivka settlement hromada	Pokrovsk Raion	INSERT_KATO
Mykhailivka	Михайлівка	2001_POP_STATS	Hrodivka settlement hromada	Pokrovsk Raion	INSERT_KATO
Novooleksandrivka	Новоолександрівка	2001_POP_STATS	Hrodivka settlement hromada	Pokrovsk Raion	INSERT_KATO
Novotoretske	Новоторецьке	2001_POP_STATS	Hrodivka settlement hromada	Pokrovsk Raion	INSERT_KATO
Prohres	Прогрес	2001_POP_STATS	Hrodivka settlement hromada	Pokrovsk Raion	INSERT_KATO
Promin	Промінь	2001_POP_STATS	Hrodivka settlement hromada	Pokrovsk Raion	INSERT_KATO
Razine	Разіне	2001_POP_STATS	Hrodivka settlement hromada	Pokrovsk Raion	INSERT_KATO
Svyrydonivka	Свиридонівка	2001_POP_STATS	Hrodivka settlement hromada	Pokrovsk Raion	INSERT_KATO
Serhiivka	Сергіївка	2001_POP_STATS	Hrodivka settlement hromada	Pokrovsk Raion	INSERT_KATO
Tymofiivka	Тимофіївка	2001_POP_STATS	Hrodivka settlement hromada	Pokrovsk Raion	INSERT_KATO
Fedorivka	Федорівка	2001_POP_STATS	Hrodivka settlement hromada	Pokrovsk Raion	INSERT_KATO
Shevchenko Pershe	Шевченко Перше	2001_POP_STATS	Hrodivka settlement hromada	Pokrovsk Raion	INSERT_KATO
Vesele	Веселе	2001_POP_STATS	Hrodivka settlement hromada	Pokrovsk Raion	INSERT_KATO
Vovche	Вовче	2001_POP_STATS	Hrodivka settlement hromada	Pokrovsk Raion	INSERT_KATO
Vozdvyzhenka	Воздвиженка	2001_POP_STATS	Hrodivka settlement hromada	Pokrovsk Raion	INSERT_KATO
Yevhenivka	Євгенівка	2001_POP_STATS	Hrodivka settlement hromada	Pokrovsk Raion	INSERT_KATO
Yelyzavetivka	Єлизаветівка	2001_POP_STATS	Hrodivka settlement hromada	Pokrovsk Raion	INSERT_KATO
Zhuravka	Журавка	2001_POP_STATS	Hrodivka settlement hromada	Pokrovsk Raion	INSERT_KATO
Hannivka	Ганнівка	2001_POP_STATS	Dobropillia urban hromada	Pokrovsk Raion	INSERT_KATO
Kopani	Копані	2001_POP_STATS	Dobropillia urban hromada	Pokrovsk Raion	INSERT_KATO
Novoviktorivka	Нововікторівка	2001_POP_STATS	Dobropillia urban hromada	Pokrovsk Raion	INSERT_KATO
Novoukrainka	Новоукраїнка	2001_POP_STATS	Dobropillia urban hromada	Pokrovsk Raion	INSERT_KATO
Rubizhne	Рубіжне	2001_POP_STATS	Dobropillia urban hromada	Pokrovsk Raion	INSERT_KATO
Viktorivka	Вікторівка	2001_POP_STATS	Dobropillia urban hromada	Pokrovsk Raion	INSERT_KATO
Virivka	Вірівка	2001_POP_STATS	Dobropillia urban hromada	Pokrovsk Raion	INSERT_KATO
Stepy	Степи	2001_POP_STATS	Dobropillia urban hromada	Pokrovsk Raion	INSERT_KATO
Hulive	Гуліве	2001_POP_STATS	Kryvorizhzhia rural hromada	Pokrovsk Raion	INSERT_KATO
Dobropillia	Добропілля	2001_POP_STATS	Kryvorizhzhia rural hromada	Pokrovsk Raion	INSERT_KATO
Kamianka	Кам'янка	2001_POP_STATS	Kryvorizhzhia rural hromada	Pokrovsk Raion	INSERT_KATO
Krasnopodillia	Красноподілля	2001_POP_STATS	Kryvorizhzhia rural hromada	Pokrovsk Raion	INSERT_KATO
Kryvorizhzhia	Криворіжжя	2001_POP_STATS	Kryvorizhzhia rural hromada	Pokrovsk Raion	INSERT_KATO
Lyman	Лиман	2001_POP_STATS	Kryvorizhzhia rural hromada	Pokrovsk Raion	INSERT_KATO
Matiasheve	Матяшеве	2001_POP_STATS	Kryvorizhzhia rural hromada	Pokrovsk Raion	INSERT_KATO
Myrne	Мирне	2001_POP_STATS	Kryvorizhzhia rural hromada	Pokrovsk Raion	INSERT_KATO
Nadiia	Надія	2001_POP_STATS	Kryvorizhzhia rural hromada	Pokrovsk Raion	INSERT_KATO
Novohryshyne	Новогришине	2001_POP_STATS	Kryvorizhzhia rural hromada	Pokrovsk Raion	INSERT_KATO
Novokryvorizhzhia	Новокриворіжжя	2001_POP_STATS	Kryvorizhzhia rural hromada	Pokrovsk Raion	INSERT_KATO
Novomariivka	Новомар'ївка	2001_POP_STATS	Kryvorizhzhia rural hromada	Pokrovsk Raion	INSERT_KATO
Novooleksandrivka	Новоолександрівка	2001_POP_STATS	Kryvorizhzhia rural hromada	Pokrovsk Raion	INSERT_KATO
Novofedorivka	Новофедорівка	2001_POP_STATS	Kryvorizhzhia rural hromada	Pokrovsk Raion	INSERT_KATO
Petrivske	Петрівське	2001_POP_STATS	Kryvorizhzhia rural hromada	Pokrovsk Raion	INSERT_KATO
Raksha	Ракша	2001_POP_STATS	Kryvorizhzhia rural hromada	Pokrovsk Raion	INSERT_KATO
Shylivka	Шилівка	2001_POP_STATS	Kryvorizhzhia rural hromada	Pokrovsk Raion	INSERT_KATO
Yuriivske	Юріївське	2001_POP_STATS	Kryvorizhzhia rural hromada	Pokrovsk Raion	INSERT_KATO
Vasylivka	Василівка	2001_POP_STATS	Kryvorizhzhia rural hromada	Pokrovsk Raion	INSERT_KATO
Zavydo-Borzenka	Завидо-Борзенка	2001_POP_STATS	Kryvorizhzhia rural hromada	Pokrovsk Raion	INSERT_KATO
Zavydo-Kudasheve	Завидо-Кудашеве	2001_POP_STATS	Kryvorizhzhia rural hromada	Pokrovsk Raion	INSERT_KATO
Zelene	Зелене	2001_POP_STATS	Kryvorizhzhia rural hromada	Pokrovsk Raion	INSERT_KATO
Berestky	Берестки	2001_POP_STATS	Kurakhove urban hromada	Pokrovsk Raion	INSERT_KATO
Hannivka	Ганнівка	2001_POP_STATS	Kurakhove urban hromada	Pokrovsk Raion	INSERT_KATO
Hihant	Гігант	2001_POP_STATS	Kurakhove urban hromada	Pokrovsk Raion	INSERT_KATO
Dalnie	Дальнє	2001_POP_STATS	Kurakhove urban hromada	Pokrovsk Raion	INSERT_KATO
Dachne	Дачне	2001_POP_STATS	Kurakhove urban hromada	Pokrovsk Raion	INSERT_KATO
Izmailivka	Ізмайлівка	2001_POP_STATS	Kurakhove urban hromada	Pokrovsk Raion	INSERT_KATO
Kostiantynopolske	Костянтинопольське	2001_POP_STATS	Kurakhove urban hromada	Pokrovsk Raion	INSERT_KATO
Kreminna Balka	Кремінна Балка	2001_POP_STATS	Kurakhove urban hromada	Pokrovsk Raion	INSERT_KATO
Novodmytrivka	Новодмитрівка	2001_POP_STATS	Kurakhove urban hromada	Pokrovsk Raion	INSERT_KATO
Novoselydivka	Новоселидівка	2001_POP_STATS	Kurakhove urban hromada	Pokrovsk Raion	INSERT_KATO
Sontsivka	Сонцівка	2001_POP_STATS	Kurakhove urban hromada	Pokrovsk Raion	INSERT_KATO
Stepanivka	Степанівка	2001_POP_STATS	Kurakhove urban hromada	Pokrovsk Raion	INSERT_KATO
Sukhi Yaly	Сухі Яли	2001_POP_STATS	Kurakhove urban hromada	Pokrovsk Raion	INSERT_KATO
Trudove	Трудове	2001_POP_STATS	Kurakhove urban hromada	Pokrovsk Raion	INSERT_KATO
Uspenivka	Успенівка	2001_POP_STATS	Kurakhove urban hromada	Pokrovsk Raion	INSERT_KATO
Yantarne	Янтарне	2001_POP_STATS	Kurakhove urban hromada	Pokrovsk Raion	INSERT_KATO
Veselyi Hai	Веселий Гай	2001_POP_STATS	Kurakhove urban hromada	Pokrovsk Raion	INSERT_KATO
Vovchenka	Вовченка	2001_POP_STATS	Kurakhove urban hromada	Pokrovsk Raion	INSERT_KATO
Voznesenka	Вознесенка	2001_POP_STATS	Kurakhove urban hromada	Pokrovsk Raion	INSERT_KATO
Zelenivka	Зеленівка	2001_POP_STATS	Kurakhove urban hromada	Pokrovsk Raion	INSERT_KATO
Zoria	Зоря	2001_POP_STATS	Kurakhove urban hromada	Pokrovsk Raion	INSERT_KATO
Antonivka	Антонівка	2001_POP_STATS	Marinka urban hromada	Pokrovsk Raion	INSERT_KATO
Bazhane Pershe	Бажане Перше	2001_POP_STATS	Marinka urban hromada	Pokrovsk Raion	INSERT_KATO
Bazhane Druhe	Бажане Друге	2001_POP_STATS	Marinka urban hromada	Pokrovsk Raion	INSERT_KATO
Heorhiivka	Георгіївка	2001_POP_STATS	Marinka urban hromada	Pokrovsk Raion	INSERT_KATO
Illinka	Іллінка	2001_POP_STATS	Marinka urban hromada	Pokrovsk Raion	INSERT_KATO
Katerynivka	Катеринівка	2001_POP_STATS	Marinka urban hromada	Pokrovsk Raion	INSERT_KATO
Kostiantynivka	Костянтинівка	2001_POP_STATS	Marinka urban hromada	Pokrovsk Raion	INSERT_KATO
Maksymilianivka	Максимільянівка	2001_POP_STATS	Marinka urban hromada	Pokrovsk Raion	INSERT_KATO
Novomykhailivka	Новомихайлівка	2001_POP_STATS	Marinka urban hromada	Pokrovsk Raion	INSERT_KATO
Oleksandropil	Олександропіль	2001_POP_STATS	Marinka urban hromada	Pokrovsk Raion	INSERT_KATO
Paraskoviivka	Парасковіївка	2001_POP_STATS	Marinka urban hromada	Pokrovsk Raion	INSERT_KATO
Romanivka	Романівка	2001_POP_STATS	Marinka urban hromada	Pokrovsk Raion	INSERT_KATO
Yelyzavetivka	Єлизаветівка	2001_POP_STATS	Marinka urban hromada	Pokrovsk Raion	INSERT_KATO
Zoriane	Зоряне	2001_POP_STATS	Marinka urban hromada	Pokrovsk Raion	INSERT_KATO
Peremoha	Перемога	2001_POP_STATS	Marinka urban hromada	Pokrovsk Raion	INSERT_KATO
Krasnyi Lyman	Красний Лиман	2001_POP_STATS	Myrnohrad urban hromada	Pokrovsk Raion	INSERT_KATO
Rivne	Рівне	2001_POP_STATS	Myrnohrad urban hromada	Pokrovsk Raion	INSERT_KATO
Svitle	Світле	2001_POP_STATS	Myrnohrad urban hromada	Pokrovsk Raion	INSERT_KATO
Sukhetske	Сухецьке	2001_POP_STATS	Myrnohrad urban hromada	Pokrovsk Raion	INSERT_KATO
Halytsynivka	Галицинівка	2001_POP_STATS	Novohrodivka urban hromada	Pokrovsk Raion	INSERT_KATO
Dolynivka	Долинівка	2001_POP_STATS	Novohrodivka urban hromada	Pokrovsk Raion	INSERT_KATO
Zavitne	Завітне	2001_POP_STATS	Novohrodivka urban hromada	Pokrovsk Raion	INSERT_KATO
Kalynove	Калинове	2001_POP_STATS	Novohrodivka urban hromada	Pokrovsk Raion	INSERT_KATO
Karlivka	Карлівка	2001_POP_STATS	Novohrodivka urban hromada	Pokrovsk Raion	INSERT_KATO
Lisivka	Лісівка	2001_POP_STATS	Novohrodivka urban hromada	Pokrovsk Raion	INSERT_KATO
Memryk	Мемрик	2001_POP_STATS	Novohrodivka urban hromada	Pokrovsk Raion	INSERT_KATO
Mykolaivka	Миколаївка	2001_POP_STATS	Novohrodivka urban hromada	Pokrovsk Raion	INSERT_KATO
Mykhailivka	Михайлівка	2001_POP_STATS	Novohrodivka urban hromada	Pokrovsk Raion	INSERT_KATO
Orlivka	Орлівка	2001_POP_STATS	Novohrodivka urban hromada	Pokrovsk Raion	INSERT_KATO
Bazhane	Бажане	2001_POP_STATS	Novohrodivka urban hromada	Pokrovsk Raion	INSERT_KATO
Marynivka	Маринівка	2001_POP_STATS	Novohrodivka urban hromada	Pokrovsk Raion	INSERT_KATO
Arkhanhelske	Архангельське	2001_POP_STATS	Ocheretyne settlement hromada	Pokrovsk Raion	INSERT_KATO
Avdiivske	Авдіївське	2001_POP_STATS	Ocheretyne settlement hromada	Pokrovsk Raion	INSERT_KATO
Berdychi	Бердичі	2001_POP_STATS	Ocheretyne settlement hromada	Pokrovsk Raion	INSERT_KATO
Mezhove	Межове	2001_POP_STATS	Ocheretyne settlement hromada	Pokrovsk Raion	INSERT_KATO
Netailove	Нетайлове	2001_POP_STATS	Ocheretyne settlement hromada	Pokrovsk Raion	INSERT_KATO
Novobakhmutivka (Note: Located in Novobakhmutivka Village Council)	Новобахмутівка	2001_POP_STATS	Ocheretyne settlement hromada	Pokrovsk Raion	INSERT_KATO
Novobakhmutivka (Note: Located in Soloviove Village Council)	Новобахмутівка	2001_POP_STATS	Ocheretyne settlement hromada	Pokrovsk Raion	INSERT_KATO
Novokalynove	Новокалинове	2001_POP_STATS	Ocheretyne settlement hromada	Pokrovsk Raion	INSERT_KATO
Novopokrovske	Новопокровське	2001_POP_STATS	Ocheretyne settlement hromada	Pokrovsk Raion	INSERT_KATO
Novoselivka	Новоселівка	2001_POP_STATS	Ocheretyne settlement hromada	Pokrovsk Raion	INSERT_KATO
Novoselivka Druha	Новоселівка Друга	2001_POP_STATS	Ocheretyne settlement hromada	Pokrovsk Raion	INSERT_KATO
Novoselivka Persha	Новоселівка Перша	2001_POP_STATS	Ocheretyne settlement hromada	Pokrovsk Raion	INSERT_KATO
Oleksandropil	Олександропіль	2001_POP_STATS	Ocheretyne settlement hromada	Pokrovsk Raion	INSERT_KATO
Orlivka	Орлівка	2001_POP_STATS	Ocheretyne settlement hromada	Pokrovsk Raion	INSERT_KATO
Panteleimonivka	Пантелеймонівка	2001_POP_STATS	Ocheretyne settlement hromada	Pokrovsk Raion	INSERT_KATO
Semenivka	Семенівка	2001_POP_STATS	Ocheretyne settlement hromada	Pokrovsk Raion	INSERT_KATO
Sokil	Сокіл	2001_POP_STATS	Ocheretyne settlement hromada	Pokrovsk Raion	INSERT_KATO
Soloviove	Соловйове	2001_POP_STATS	Ocheretyne settlement hromada	Pokrovsk Raion	INSERT_KATO
Tonenke	Тоненьке	2001_POP_STATS	Ocheretyne settlement hromada	Pokrovsk Raion	INSERT_KATO
Troitske	Троїцьке	2001_POP_STATS	Ocheretyne settlement hromada	Pokrovsk Raion	INSERT_KATO
Umanske	Уманське	2001_POP_STATS	Ocheretyne settlement hromada	Pokrovsk Raion	INSERT_KATO
Yasnobrodivka	Яснобродівка	2001_POP_STATS	Ocheretyne settlement hromada	Pokrovsk Raion	INSERT_KATO
Yasnohorivka	Ясногорівка	2001_POP_STATS	Ocheretyne settlement hromada	Pokrovsk Raion	INSERT_KATO
Vasylivka	Василівка	2001_POP_STATS	Ocheretyne settlement hromada	Pokrovsk Raion	INSERT_KATO
Vesele	Веселе	2001_POP_STATS	Ocheretyne settlement hromada	Pokrovsk Raion	INSERT_KATO
Vodiane	Водяне	2001_POP_STATS	Ocheretyne settlement hromada	Pokrovsk Raion	INSERT_KATO
Soniachne	Сонячне	2001_POP_STATS	Ocheretyne settlement hromada	Pokrovsk Raion	INSERT_KATO
Vidrodzhennia	Відродження	2001_POP_STATS	Pokrovsk urban hromada	Pokrovsk Raion	INSERT_KATO
Bohdanivka	Богданівка	2001_POP_STATS	Pokrovsk urban hromada	Pokrovsk Raion	INSERT_KATO
Dachenske	Даченське	2001_POP_STATS	Pokrovsk urban hromada	Pokrovsk Raion	INSERT_KATO
Hnativka	Гнатівка	2001_POP_STATS	Pokrovsk urban hromada	Pokrovsk Raion	INSERT_KATO
Horikhove	Горіхове	2001_POP_STATS	Pokrovsk urban hromada	Pokrovsk Raion	INSERT_KATO
Hryshyne	Гришине	2001_POP_STATS	Pokrovsk urban hromada	Pokrovsk Raion	INSERT_KATO
Lysivka	Лисівка	2001_POP_STATS	Pokrovsk urban hromada	Pokrovsk Raion	INSERT_KATO
Novoandriivka	Новоандріївка	2001_POP_STATS	Pokrovsk urban hromada	Pokrovsk Raion	INSERT_KATO
Novoielyzavetivka	Новоєлизаветівка	2001_POP_STATS	Pokrovsk urban hromada	Pokrovsk Raion	INSERT_KATO
Novooleksandrivka	Новоолександрівка	2001_POP_STATS	Pokrovsk urban hromada	Pokrovsk Raion	INSERT_KATO
Novoolenivka	Новооленівка	2001_POP_STATS	Pokrovsk urban hromada	Pokrovsk Raion	INSERT_KATO
Novopavlivka	Новопавлівка	2001_POP_STATS	Pokrovsk urban hromada	Pokrovsk Raion	INSERT_KATO
Novotroitske	Новотроїцьке	2001_POP_STATS	Pokrovsk urban hromada	Pokrovsk Raion	INSERT_KATO
Novoukrainka	Новоукраїнка	2001_POP_STATS	Pokrovsk urban hromada	Pokrovsk Raion	INSERT_KATO
Novovasylivka	Нововасилівка	2001_POP_STATS	Pokrovsk urban hromada	Pokrovsk Raion	INSERT_KATO
Pishchane	Піщане	2001_POP_STATS	Pokrovsk urban hromada	Pokrovsk Raion	INSERT_KATO
Preobrazhenka	Преображенка	2001_POP_STATS	Pokrovsk urban hromada	Pokrovsk Raion	INSERT_KATO
Rih	Ріг	2001_POP_STATS	Pokrovsk urban hromada	Pokrovsk Raion	INSERT_KATO
Solone	Солоне	2001_POP_STATS	Pokrovsk urban hromada	Pokrovsk Raion	INSERT_KATO
Sribne	Срібне	2001_POP_STATS	Pokrovsk urban hromada	Pokrovsk Raion	INSERT_KATO
Sukhyi Yar	Сухий Яр	2001_POP_STATS	Pokrovsk urban hromada	Pokrovsk Raion	INSERT_KATO
Troianda	Троянда	2001_POP_STATS	Pokrovsk urban hromada	Pokrovsk Raion	INSERT_KATO
Troitske	Троїцьке	2001_POP_STATS	Pokrovsk urban hromada	Pokrovsk Raion	INSERT_KATO
Ukrainka	Українка	2001_POP_STATS	Pokrovsk urban hromada	Pokrovsk Raion	INSERT_KATO
Uspenivka	Успенівка	2001_POP_STATS	Pokrovsk urban hromada	Pokrovsk Raion	INSERT_KATO
Vovkove	Вовкове	2001_POP_STATS	Pokrovsk urban hromada	Pokrovsk Raion	INSERT_KATO
Yasenove	Ясенове	2001_POP_STATS	Pokrovsk urban hromada	Pokrovsk Raion	INSERT_KATO
Zaporizhzhia	Запоріжжя	2001_POP_STATS	Pokrovsk urban hromada	Pokrovsk Raion	INSERT_KATO
Zelene	Зелене	2001_POP_STATS	Pokrovsk urban hromada	Pokrovsk Raion	INSERT_KATO
Zhovte	Жовте	2001_POP_STATS	Pokrovsk urban hromada	Pokrovsk Raion	INSERT_KATO
Zvirove	Звірове	2001_POP_STATS	Pokrovsk urban hromada	Pokrovsk Raion	INSERT_KATO
Hryhorivka	Григорівка	2001_POP_STATS	Selydove urban hromada	Pokrovsk Raion	INSERT_KATO
Novooleksiivka	Новоолексіївка	2001_POP_STATS	Selydove urban hromada	Pokrovsk Raion	INSERT_KATO
Petrivka	Петрівка	2001_POP_STATS	Selydove urban hromada	Pokrovsk Raion	INSERT_KATO
Pustynka	Пустинка	2001_POP_STATS	Selydove urban hromada	Pokrovsk Raion	INSERT_KATO
Yuriivka	Юріївка	2001_POP_STATS	Selydove urban hromada	Pokrovsk Raion	INSERT_KATO
Boikivka	Бойківка	2001_POP_STATS	Shakhove rural hromada	Pokrovsk Raion	INSERT_KATO
Vesele	Веселе	2001_POP_STATS	Shakhove rural hromada	Pokrovsk Raion	INSERT_KATO
Vilne	Вільне	2001_POP_STATS	Shakhove rural hromada	Pokrovsk Raion	INSERT_KATO
Volodymyrivka	Володимирівка	2001_POP_STATS	Shakhove rural hromada	Pokrovsk Raion	INSERT_KATO
Hruzke	Грузьке	2001_POP_STATS	Shakhove rural hromada	Pokrovsk Raion	INSERT_KATO
Zolotyi Kolodiaz	Золотий Колодязь	2001_POP_STATS	Shakhove rural hromada	Pokrovsk Raion	INSERT_KATO
Ivanivka	Іванівка	2001_POP_STATS	Shakhove rural hromada	Pokrovsk Raion	INSERT_KATO
Koptieve	Коптєве	2001_POP_STATS	Shakhove rural hromada	Pokrovsk Raion	INSERT_KATO
Kucheriv Yar	Кучерів Яр	2001_POP_STATS	Shakhove rural hromada	Pokrovsk Raion	INSERT_KATO
Lidyne	Лідине	2001_POP_STATS	Shakhove rural hromada	Pokrovsk Raion	INSERT_KATO
Nove Shakhove	Нове Шахове	2001_POP_STATS	Shakhove rural hromada	Pokrovsk Raion	INSERT_KATO
Novotoretske	Новоторецьке	2001_POP_STATS	Shakhove rural hromada	Pokrovsk Raion	INSERT_KATO
Novotroitske	Новотроїцьке	2001_POP_STATS	Shakhove rural hromada	Pokrovsk Raion	INSERT_KATO
Pankivka	Панківка	2001_POP_STATS	Shakhove rural hromada	Pokrovsk Raion	INSERT_KATO
Petrivka	Петрівка	2001_POP_STATS	Shakhove rural hromada	Pokrovsk Raion	INSERT_KATO
Toretske	Торецьке	2001_POP_STATS	Shakhove rural hromada	Pokrovsk Raion	INSERT_KATO
Shakhove	Шахове	2001_POP_STATS	Shakhove rural hromada	Pokrovsk Raion	INSERT_KATO
Marivka	Мар'ївка	2001_POP_STATS	Shakhove rural hromada	Pokrovsk Raion	INSERT_KATO
Zatyshok	Затишок	2001_POP_STATS	Shakhove rural hromada	Pokrovsk Raion	INSERT_KATO
Zapovidne	Заповідне	2001_POP_STATS	Shakhove rural hromada	Pokrovsk Raion	INSERT_KATO
Kalynivka	Калинівка	2001_POP_STATS	Udachne settlement hromada	Pokrovsk Raion	INSERT_KATO
Molodetske	Молодецьке	2001_POP_STATS	Udachne settlement hromada	Pokrovsk Raion	INSERT_KATO
Muravka	Муравка	2001_POP_STATS	Udachne settlement hromada	Pokrovsk Raion	INSERT_KATO
Novomykolaivka	Новомиколаївка	2001_POP_STATS	Udachne settlement hromada	Pokrovsk Raion	INSERT_KATO
Novoserhiivka	Новосергіївка	2001_POP_STATS	Udachne settlement hromada	Pokrovsk Raion	INSERT_KATO
Serhiivka	Сергіївка	2001_POP_STATS	Udachne settlement hromada	Pokrovsk Raion	INSERT_KATO
Kalynove	Калинове	2001_POP_STATS	Khlibodarivka rural hromada	Volnovakha Raion	INSERT_KATO
Peredove	Передове	2001_POP_STATS	Khlibodarivka rural hromada	Volnovakha Raion	INSERT_KATO
Anadol	Анадоль	2001_POP_STATS	Khlibodarivka rural hromada	Volnovakha Raion	INSERT_KATO
Holubytske	Голубицьке	2001_POP_STATS	Khlibodarivka rural hromada	Volnovakha Raion	INSERT_KATO
Dianivka	Діанівка	2001_POP_STATS	Khlibodarivka rural hromada	Volnovakha Raion	INSERT_KATO
Khlibodarivka	Хлібодарівка	2001_POP_STATS	Khlibodarivka rural hromada	Volnovakha Raion	INSERT_KATO
Kropyvnytske	Кропивницьке	2001_POP_STATS	Khlibodarivka rural hromada	Volnovakha Raion	INSERT_KATO
Lazarivka	Лазарівка	2001_POP_STATS	Khlibodarivka rural hromada	Volnovakha Raion	INSERT_KATO
Lidyne	Лідине	2001_POP_STATS	Khlibodarivka rural hromada	Volnovakha Raion	INSERT_KATO
Malynivka	Малинівка	2001_POP_STATS	Khlibodarivka rural hromada	Volnovakha Raion	INSERT_KATO
Novomykolaivka	Новомиколаївка	2001_POP_STATS	Khlibodarivka rural hromada	Volnovakha Raion	INSERT_KATO
Novooleksiivka	Новоолексіївка	2001_POP_STATS	Khlibodarivka rural hromada	Volnovakha Raion	INSERT_KATO
Petrivka	Петрівка	2001_POP_STATS	Khlibodarivka rural hromada	Volnovakha Raion	INSERT_KATO
Polkove	Полкове	2001_POP_STATS	Khlibodarivka rural hromada	Volnovakha Raion	INSERT_KATO
Pryvilne	Привільне	2001_POP_STATS	Khlibodarivka rural hromada	Volnovakha Raion	INSERT_KATO
Rivnopil	Рівнопіль	2001_POP_STATS	Khlibodarivka rural hromada	Volnovakha Raion	INSERT_KATO
Soniachne	Сонячне	2001_POP_STATS	Khlibodarivka rural hromada	Volnovakha Raion	INSERT_KATO
Stepne	Степне	2001_POP_STATS	Khlibodarivka rural hromada	Volnovakha Raion	INSERT_KATO
Stritenka	Стрітенка	2001_POP_STATS	Khlibodarivka rural hromada	Volnovakha Raion	INSERT_KATO
Shevchenko	Шевченко	2001_POP_STATS	Khlibodarivka rural hromada	Volnovakha Raion	INSERT_KATO
Vesele	Веселе	2001_POP_STATS	Khlibodarivka rural hromada	Volnovakha Raion	INSERT_KATO
Vilne	Вільне	2001_POP_STATS	Khlibodarivka rural hromada	Volnovakha Raion	INSERT_KATO
Zatyshne	Затишне	2001_POP_STATS	Khlibodarivka rural hromada	Volnovakha Raion	INSERT_KATO
Zachativka	Зачатівка	2001_POP_STATS	Khlibodarivka rural hromada	Volnovakha Raion	INSERT_KATO
Zlatoustivka	Златоустівка	2001_POP_STATS	Khlibodarivka rural hromada	Volnovakha Raion	INSERT_KATO
Znamenivka	Знаменівка	2001_POP_STATS	Khlibodarivka rural hromada	Volnovakha Raion	INSERT_KATO
Komar	Комар	2001_POP_STATS	Komar rural hromada	Volnovakha Raion	INSERT_KATO
Andriivka-Klevtsove	Андріївка-Клевцове	2001_POP_STATS	Komar rural hromada	Volnovakha Raion	INSERT_KATO
Vesele	Веселе	2001_POP_STATS	Komar rural hromada	Volnovakha Raion	INSERT_KATO
Vilne Pole	Вільне Поле	2001_POP_STATS	Komar rural hromada	Volnovakha Raion	INSERT_KATO
Voskresenka	Воскресенка	2001_POP_STATS	Komar rural hromada	Volnovakha Raion	INSERT_KATO
Hrushivske	Грушівське	2001_POP_STATS	Komar rural hromada	Volnovakha Raion	INSERT_KATO
Dniproenerhiia	Дніпроенергія	2001_POP_STATS	Komar rural hromada	Volnovakha Raion	INSERT_KATO
Zaporizhzhia	Запоріжжя	2001_POP_STATS	Komar rural hromada	Volnovakha Raion	INSERT_KATO
Zirka	Зірка	2001_POP_STATS	Komar rural hromada	Volnovakha Raion	INSERT_KATO
Myrne	Мирне	2001_POP_STATS	Komar rural hromada	Volnovakha Raion	INSERT_KATO
Novoocheretuvate	Новоочеретувате	2001_POP_STATS	Komar rural hromada	Volnovakha Raion	INSERT_KATO
Novokhatske	Новохатське	2001_POP_STATS	Komar rural hromada	Volnovakha Raion	INSERT_KATO
Oleksandrohrad	Олександроград	2001_POP_STATS	Komar rural hromada	Volnovakha Raion	INSERT_KATO
Piddubne	Піддубне	2001_POP_STATS	Komar rural hromada	Volnovakha Raion	INSERT_KATO
Pryvilne	Привільне	2001_POP_STATS	Komar rural hromada	Volnovakha Raion	INSERT_KATO
Skudne	Скудне	2001_POP_STATS	Komar rural hromada	Volnovakha Raion	INSERT_KATO
Tovste	Товсте	2001_POP_STATS	Komar rural hromada	Volnovakha Raion	INSERT_KATO
Fedorivka	Федорівка	2001_POP_STATS	Komar rural hromada	Volnovakha Raion	INSERT_KATO
Yalta	Ялта	2001_POP_STATS	Komar rural hromada	Volnovakha Raion	INSERT_KATO
Hranitne	Гранітне	2001_POP_STATS	Myrne settlement hromada	Volnovakha Raion	INSERT_KATO
Kamianka	Кам'янка	2001_POP_STATS	Myrne settlement hromada	Volnovakha Raion	INSERT_KATO
Novohryhorivka	Новогригорівка	2001_POP_STATS	Myrne settlement hromada	Volnovakha Raion	INSERT_KATO
Novoselivka	Новоселівка	2001_POP_STATS	Myrne settlement hromada	Volnovakha Raion	INSERT_KATO
Novoselivka Druha	Новоселівка Друга	2001_POP_STATS	Myrne settlement hromada	Volnovakha Raion	INSERT_KATO
Starohnativka	Старогнатівка	2001_POP_STATS	Myrne settlement hromada	Volnovakha Raion	INSERT_KATO
Staromarivka	Старомар'ївка	2001_POP_STATS	Myrne settlement hromada	Volnovakha Raion	INSERT_KATO
Stepanivka	Степанівка	2001_POP_STATS	Myrne settlement hromada	Volnovakha Raion	INSERT_KATO
Zaporizke	Запорізьке	2001_POP_STATS	Myrne settlement hromada	Volnovakha Raion	INSERT_KATO
Bohdanivka	Богданівка	2001_POP_STATS	Olhynka settlement hromada	Volnovakha Raion	INSERT_KATO
Lisne	Лісне	2001_POP_STATS	Olhynka settlement hromada	Volnovakha Raion	INSERT_KATO
Mykolaivka	Миколаївка	2001_POP_STATS	Olhynka settlement hromada	Volnovakha Raion	INSERT_KATO
Novohnativka	Новогнатівка	2001_POP_STATS	Olhynka settlement hromada	Volnovakha Raion	INSERT_KATO
Pilne	Пільне	2001_POP_STATS	Olhynka settlement hromada	Volnovakha Raion	INSERT_KATO
Viktorivka	Вікторівка	2001_POP_STATS	Olhynka settlement hromada	Volnovakha Raion	INSERT_KATO
Nova Karakuba	Нова Каракуба	2001_POP_STATS	Staromlynivka rural hromada	Volnovakha Raion	INSERT_KATO
Staromlynivka	Старомлинівка	2001_POP_STATS	Staromlynivka rural hromada	Volnovakha Raion	INSERT_KATO
Volodyne	Володине	2001_POP_STATS	Staromlynivka rural hromada	Volnovakha Raion	INSERT_KATO
Heorhiivka	Георгіївка	2001_POP_STATS	Staromlynivka rural hromada	Volnovakha Raion	INSERT_KATO
Yevhenivka	Євгенівка	2001_POP_STATS	Staromlynivka rural hromada	Volnovakha Raion	INSERT_KATO
Zavitne Bazhannia	Завітне Бажання	2001_POP_STATS	Staromlynivka rural hromada	Volnovakha Raion	INSERT_KATO
Malyi Kermenchyk	Малий Керменчик	2001_POP_STATS	Staromlynivka rural hromada	Volnovakha Raion	INSERT_KATO
Novomaiorske	Новомайорське	2001_POP_STATS	Staromlynivka rural hromada	Volnovakha Raion	INSERT_KATO
Novopetrykivka	Новопетриківка	2001_POP_STATS	Staromlynivka rural hromada	Volnovakha Raion	INSERT_KATO
Orlynske	Орлинське	2001_POP_STATS	Staromlynivka rural hromada	Volnovakha Raion	INSERT_KATO
Yalinske	Ялинське	2001_POP_STATS	Staromlynivka rural hromada	Volnovakha Raion	INSERT_KATO
Andriivka	Андріївка	2001_POP_STATS	Velyka Novosilka settlement hromada	Volnovakha Raion	INSERT_KATO
Bahatyr	Багатир	2001_POP_STATS	Velyka Novosilka settlement hromada	Volnovakha Raion	INSERT_KATO
Kostiantynopil	Костянтинопіль	2001_POP_STATS	Velyka Novosilka settlement hromada	Volnovakha Raion	INSERT_KATO
Makarivka	Макарівка	2001_POP_STATS	Velyka Novosilka settlement hromada	Volnovakha Raion	INSERT_KATO
Neskuchne	Нескучне	2001_POP_STATS	Velyka Novosilka settlement hromada	Volnovakha Raion	INSERT_KATO
Novopil	Новопіль	2001_POP_STATS	Velyka Novosilka settlement hromada	Volnovakha Raion	INSERT_KATO
Novosilka	Новосілка	2001_POP_STATS	Velyka Novosilka settlement hromada	Volnovakha Raion	INSERT_KATO
Novoukrainka	Новоукраїнка	2001_POP_STATS	Velyka Novosilka settlement hromada	Volnovakha Raion	INSERT_KATO
Novyi Komar	Новий Комар	2001_POP_STATS	Velyka Novosilka settlement hromada	Volnovakha Raion	INSERT_KATO
Oleksiivka	Олексіївка	2001_POP_STATS	Velyka Novosilka settlement hromada	Volnovakha Raion	INSERT_KATO
Petropavlivka	Петропавлівка	2001_POP_STATS	Velyka Novosilka settlement hromada	Volnovakha Raion	INSERT_KATO
Rivnopil	Рівнопіль	2001_POP_STATS	Velyka Novosilka settlement hromada	Volnovakha Raion	INSERT_KATO
Shakhtarske	Шахтарське	2001_POP_STATS	Velyka Novosilka settlement hromada	Volnovakha Raion	INSERT_KATO
Shevchenko	Шевченко	2001_POP_STATS	Velyka Novosilka settlement hromada	Volnovakha Raion	INSERT_KATO
Slovianka	Слов'янка	2001_POP_STATS	Velyka Novosilka settlement hromada	Volnovakha Raion	INSERT_KATO
Staromaiorske	Старомайорське	2001_POP_STATS	Velyka Novosilka settlement hromada	Volnovakha Raion	INSERT_KATO
Storozheve	Сторожеве	2001_POP_STATS	Velyka Novosilka settlement hromada	Volnovakha Raion	INSERT_KATO
Ulakly	Улакли	2001_POP_STATS	Velyka Novosilka settlement hromada	Volnovakha Raion	INSERT_KATO
Vremivka	Времівка	2001_POP_STATS	Velyka Novosilka settlement hromada	Volnovakha Raion	INSERT_KATO
Zelene Pole	Зелене Поле	2001_POP_STATS	Velyka Novosilka settlement hromada	Volnovakha Raion	INSERT_KATO
Zelenyi Kut	Зелений Кут	2001_POP_STATS	Velyka Novosilka settlement hromada	Volnovakha Raion	INSERT_KATO
Blahovishchenka	Благовіщенка	2001_POP_STATS	Volnovakha urban hromada	Volnovakha Raion	INSERT_KATO
Blyzhnie	Ближнє	2001_POP_STATS	Volnovakha urban hromada	Volnovakha Raion	INSERT_KATO
Buhas	Бугас	2001_POP_STATS	Volnovakha urban hromada	Volnovakha Raion	INSERT_KATO
Dmytrivka	Дмитрівка	2001_POP_STATS	Volnovakha urban hromada	Volnovakha Raion	INSERT_KATO
Ivanivka	Іванівка	2001_POP_STATS	Volnovakha urban hromada	Volnovakha Raion	INSERT_KATO
Kyrylivka	Кирилівка	2001_POP_STATS	Volnovakha urban hromada	Volnovakha Raion	INSERT_KATO
Malohnativka	Малогнатівка	2001_POP_STATS	Volnovakha urban hromada	Volnovakha Raion	INSERT_KATO
Novoandriivka	Новоандріївка	2001_POP_STATS	Volnovakha urban hromada	Volnovakha Raion	INSERT_KATO
Novoapostolivka	Новоапостолівка	2001_POP_STATS	Volnovakha urban hromada	Volnovakha Raion	INSERT_KATO
Novohryhorivka	Новогригорівка	2001_POP_STATS	Volnovakha urban hromada	Volnovakha Raion	INSERT_KATO
Novopavlivka	Новопавлівка	2001_POP_STATS	Volnovakha urban hromada	Volnovakha Raion	INSERT_KATO
Novotatarivka	Новотатарівка	2001_POP_STATS	Volnovakha urban hromada	Volnovakha Raion	INSERT_KATO
Prokhorivka	Прохорівка	2001_POP_STATS	Volnovakha urban hromada	Volnovakha Raion	INSERT_KATO
Rybynske	Рибинське	2001_POP_STATS	Volnovakha urban hromada	Volnovakha Raion	INSERT_KATO
Svobodne	Свободне	2001_POP_STATS	Volnovakha urban hromada	Volnovakha Raion	INSERT_KATO
Tarasivka	Тарасівка	2001_POP_STATS	Volnovakha urban hromada	Volnovakha Raion	INSERT_KATO
Trudivske	Трудівське	2001_POP_STATS	Volnovakha urban hromada	Volnovakha Raion	INSERT_KATO
Trudove	Трудове	2001_POP_STATS	Volnovakha urban hromada	Volnovakha Raion	INSERT_KATO
Valerianivka	Валер'янівка	2001_POP_STATS	Volnovakha urban hromada	Volnovakha Raion	INSERT_KATO
Vasylivka	Василівка	2001_POP_STATS	Volnovakha urban hromada	Volnovakha Raion	INSERT_KATO
Zelenyi Hai	Зелений Гай	2001_POP_STATS	Volnovakha urban hromada	Volnovakha Raion	INSERT_KATO
Davydovske	Давидовське	2001_POP_STATS	Vuhledar urban hromada	Volnovakha Raion	INSERT_KATO
Berezove	Березове	2001_POP_STATS	Vuhledar urban hromada	Volnovakha Raion	INSERT_KATO
Bohoiavlenka	Богоявленка	2001_POP_STATS	Vuhledar urban hromada	Volnovakha Raion	INSERT_KATO
Maksymivka	Максимівка	2001_POP_STATS	Vuhledar urban hromada	Volnovakha Raion	INSERT_KATO
Mykilske	Микільське	2001_POP_STATS	Vuhledar urban hromada	Volnovakha Raion	INSERT_KATO
Novoukrainka	Новоукраїнка	2001_POP_STATS	Vuhledar urban hromada	Volnovakha Raion	INSERT_KATO
Pavlivka	Павлівка	2001_POP_STATS	Vuhledar urban hromada	Volnovakha Raion	INSERT_KATO
Prechystivka	Пречистівка	2001_POP_STATS	Vuhledar urban hromada	Volnovakha Raion	INSERT_KATO
Shevchenko	Шевченко	2001_POP_STATS	Vuhledar urban hromada	Volnovakha Raion	INSERT_KATO
Solodke	Солодке	2001_POP_STATS	Vuhledar urban hromada	Volnovakha Raion	INSERT_KATO
Stepne	Степне	2001_POP_STATS	Vuhledar urban hromada	Volnovakha Raion	INSERT_KATO
Taramchuk	Тарамчук	2001_POP_STATS	Vuhledar urban hromada	Volnovakha Raion	INSERT_KATO
Vodiane	Водяне	2001_POP_STATS	Vuhledar urban hromada	Volnovakha Raion	INSERT_KATO
Yehorivka	Єгорівка	2001_POP_STATS	Vuhledar urban hromada	Volnovakha Raion	INSERT_KATO

== See also ==
- List of cities in Donetsk Oblast
