= Kodema =

Village in Donetsk Oblast, Ukraine

Kodema Кодема
- Village
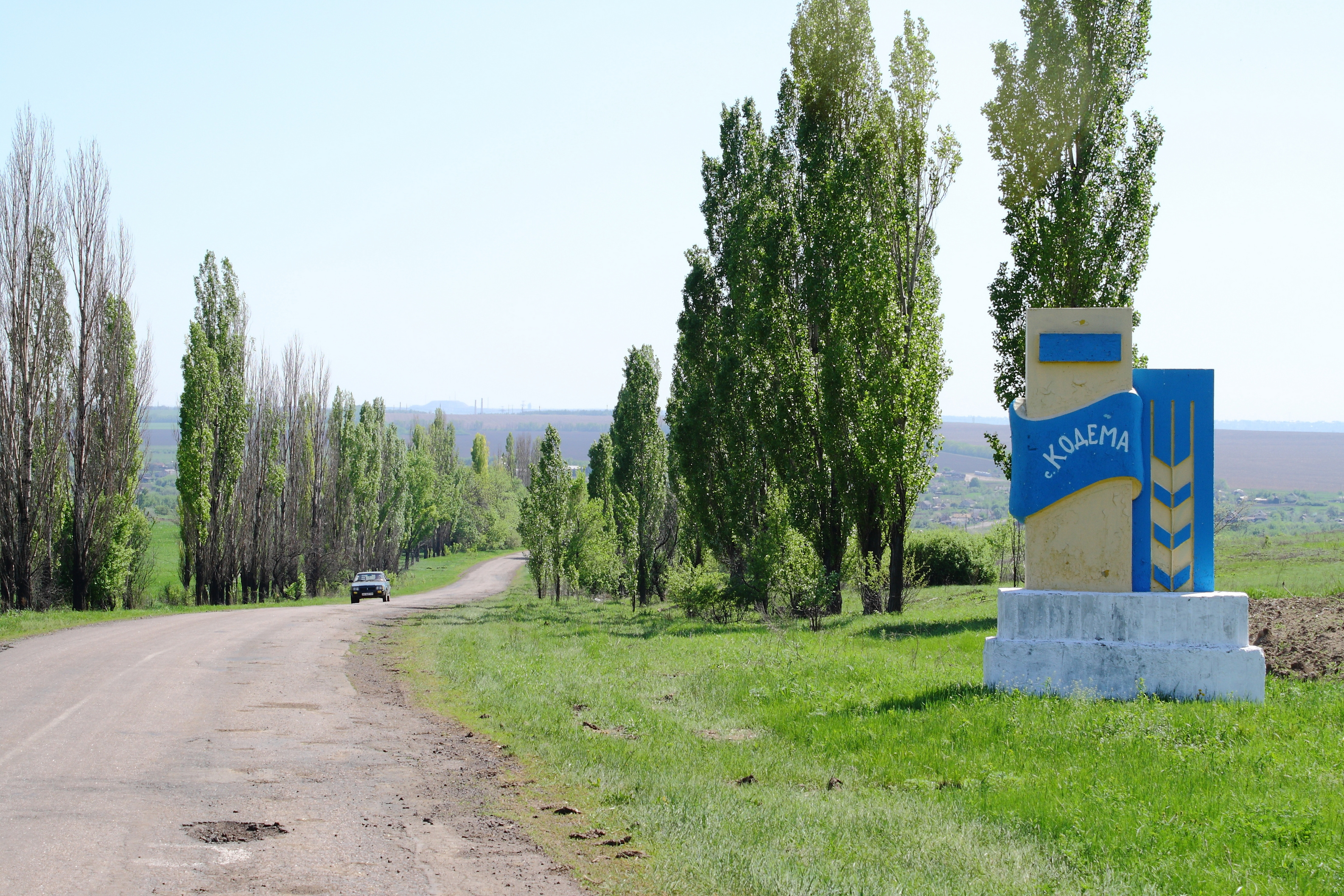

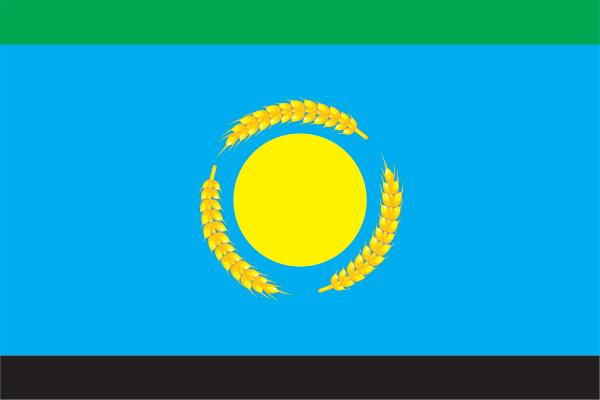
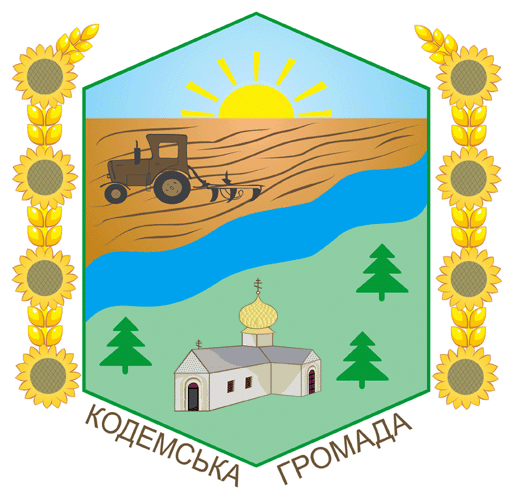
- Flag Coat of arms

- Location of Kodema within Ukraine Kodema (Ukraine)
- Coordinates: 48.474444°N 38.090833°E
- Country: Ukraine
- Oblast: Donetsk Oblast
- Raion: Bakhmut Raion
- Hromada: Svitlodarsk urban hromada
- Founded: 17th century

Area
  - Total: 2.96 km^{2} (1.14 sq mi)
- Elevation: 136 m (446 ft)

Population (2001 census)
  - Total: 590
  - Density: 200/km^{2} (520/sq mi)
- Time zone: UTC+2 (EET)
  - Summer (DST): UTC+3 (EEST)
- Postal code: 84572
- Area code: +380 5547

Kodema (Ukrainian: Кодема; Russian: Кодема) is a village in Bakhmut Raion (district) in Donetsk Oblast of eastern Ukraine, at about 61.0 kilometres (37.9 mi) northeast by north from the centre of Donetsk city.

== History ==
Kodema was founded in the 17th century. From the Soviet period, it was the center of a village council that also contained the villages Dacha, Mykolaivka Druha, Mykolaivka Persha, and Odradivka.

The village came under attack by Russian forces in 2022, during the Russian invasion of Ukraine.

== Demographics ==
As of the 2001 Ukrainian census, Kodema had a population of 590 people.
