= Mykolaivka Druha =

Mykolaivka Druha (Ukrainian: Миколаївка Друга) is a common toponym (place name) in Ukraine:

== Villages ==
- Mykolaivka Druha, Donetsk Oblast, a village in Donetsk Oblast
- Mykolaivka Druha, Lozova Raion, Kharkiv Oblast, a village in Lozova Raion, Kharkiv Oblast
- Mykolaivka Druha, Kupiansk Raion, Kharkiv Oblast, a village in Kupiansk Raion, Kharkiv Oblast
- Mykolaivka Druha, Zaporizhzhia Oblast, a village in Zaporizhzhia Oblast

== Rural settlements ==
- Mykolaivka Druha, former name of the rural settlement Mykolaivka in Mykolaivka settlement hromada, Berezivka Raion, Odesa Oblast

== See also ==
- Mykolaivka
