= Krynychne =

Krynychne (Ukrainian: Криничне) may refer to several places in Ukraine:

== Crimea ==
- Krynychne, Crimea, village in Bilohirsk Raion

== Donetsk Oblast ==
- Krynychne, Bakhmut Raion, Donetsk Oblast, village in Bakhmut Raion
- Krynychne, Mariupol Raion, Donetsk Oblast, village in Mariupol Raion

== Kharkiv Oblast ==
- Krynychne, Kharkiv Oblast, village in Izium Raion

== Kirovohrad Oblast ==
- Krynychne, Kirovohrad Oblast, village in Kropyvnytskyi Raion

== Luhansk Oblast ==
- Krynychne, Alchevsk Raion, Luhansk Oblast, rural settlement in Alchevsk Raion
- Krynychne, Dovzhansk Raion, Luhansk Oblast, also known as Biriukove, urban-type settlement in Dovzhansk Raion
- Krynychne, Starobilsk Raion, Luhansk Oblast, village in Starobilsk Raion

== Odesa Oblast ==
- Krynychne, Odesa Oblast, village in Bolhrad Raion

== Poltava Oblast ==
- Krynychne, Poltava Oblast, village in Poltava Raion

== Sumy Oblast ==
- Krynychne, Sumy Oblast, village in Okhtyrka Raion

== Volyn Oblast ==
- Krynychne, Volyn Oblast, village in Kamin-Kashyrskyi Raion

== Zaporizhzhia Oblast ==
- Krynychne, Polohy Raion, Zaporizhzhia Oblast, village in Polohy Raion
- Krynychne, Zaporizhzhia Raion, Zaporizhzhia Oblast, village in Zaporizhzhia Raion
