= Oleksandrivka settlement hromada (Kramatorsk Raion) =

Oleksandrivka settlement hromada Олександрівська селищна громада
- Hromada
- Interactive map of Oleksandrivka settlement hromada
- Country: Ukraine
- Oblast: Donetsk
- Raion: Kramatorsk

Area
  - Total: 732.8 km^{2} (282.9 sq mi)

Population (2020)
  - Total: 12,320
  - Density: 16.81/km^{2} (43.54/sq mi)
- Settlements: 42
- Villages: 41
- Towns: 1

Oleksandrivka settlement hromada (Ukrainian: Олександрівська селищна громада) is a hromada of Ukraine, located in Kramatorsk Raion, Donetsk Oblast. Its administrative center is the town of Oleksandrivka.

It has an area of 732.8 square kilometres (282.9 mi^{2}) and a population of 12,320, as of 2020.

The hromada includes 42 settlements: 1 town (Oleksandrivka) and 41 villages:

- Bezzabotivka
- Buzynivka
- Varvarivka
- Vysokopillia
- Holubivka
- Hromova Balka
- Dmytro-Daryivka
- Dmytrokoline
- Elizavetivka
- Zaparo-Marivka
- Zelene
- Zeleny Brid
- Znamenivka
- Zoloti Stavky
- Karpivka
- Levadne
- Lvivka
- Maryivka
- Mykilske
- Myrna Dolyna
- Mykhailivka
- Nadezhdivka
- Nekremenne
- Novy Kavkaz
- Novoandriivka
- Novobakhmetiyeve
- Novoznamenivka
- Novooleksandrivka
- Novopoltavka
- Novoprihozhe
- Novostepanivka
- Ocheretyne
- Pasichne
- Petrivka Druha
- Petrivka Persha
- Rozdollia
- Sofiivka
- Sofiyino-Lyman
- Starovarvarivka
- Shavr Ove
- Yakovlivka

== See also ==
- List of hromadas of Ukraine
