= Roty, Donetsk Oblast =

Roty Роти
- Rural settlement
- Location within Donetsk Oblast Location within Ukraine
- Coordinates: 48°31′5″N 38°13′50″E
- Country: Ukraine
- Oblast: Donetsk Oblast
- Raion: Bakhmut Raion
- Hromada: Svitlodarsk urban hromada
- Elevation: 214 m (702 ft)

Population
  - Total: 65
- Postal code: 84562
- Area code: +380-6274

Roty (Ukrainian: Роти) is a rural settlement in Bakhmut Raion, Donetsk Oblast, eastern Ukraine. Administratively, it is part of Svitlodarsk urban hromada, one of the hromadas of Ukraine.

== History ==
On 2 August 2022, during the Russian invasion of Ukraine, Russian forces launched unsuccessful military offensives against the settlement.

== See also ==
- List of villages in Donetsk Oblast
