= Semyhiria =

Semyhiria Семигір'я
- Village
- Location within Donetsk Oblast Location within Ukraine
- Coordinates: 48°28′13″N 38°8′12″E
- Country: Ukraine
- Oblast: Donetsk Oblast
- Raion: Bakhmut Raion
- Hromada: Svitlodarsk urban hromada
- Elevation: 173 m (568 ft)

Population
  - Total: 273
- Postal code: 84573
- Area code: +380-6274

Semyhiria (Ukrainian: Семигір'я) is a village located in Bakhmut Raion of Donetsk Oblast, eastern Ukraine. Administratively, it is part of Svitlodarsk urban hromada, one of the hromadas of Ukraine.

== History ==
On 24 July 2022, during the Russian invasion of Ukraine, Russian forces conducted military offensives towards the village.

== See also ==
- List of villages in Donetsk Oblast
