= Myronivka, Donetsk Oblast =

Myronivka Миронівка
- Village
- Location within Donetsk Oblast Location within Ukraine
- Coordinates: 48°29′8″N 38°15′30″E
- Country: Ukraine
- Oblast: Donetsk Oblast
- Raion: Bakhmut Raion
- Hromada: Svitlodarsk urban hromada
- Elevation: 155 m (509 ft)

Population
  - Total: 46
- Postal code: 84580
- Area code: +380-6274

Myronivka (Ukrainian: Миронівка) is a village located in Bakhmut Raion of Donetsk Oblast, eastern Ukraine. Administratively, it is part of Svitlodarsk urban hromada, one of the hromadas of Ukraine.

== History ==
On 28 June 2022, during the Russian invasion of Ukraine, the village was attacked by Russian forces.

== See also ==
- List of villages in Donetsk Oblast
