= Vozdvyzhenka, Donetsk Oblast =

Vozdvyzhenka Воздвиженка
- Village
- Location within Donetsk Oblast Location within Ukraine
- Coordinates: 48°29′52″N 38°17′24″E
- Country: Ukraine
- Oblast: Donetsk Oblast
- Raion: Bakhmut Raion
- Hromada: Svitlodarsk urban hromada
- Elevation: 143 m (469 ft)

Population
  - Total: 263
- Postal code: 84580
- Area code: +380-6274

Vozdvyzhenka (Ukrainian: Воздвиженка) is a village located in Bakhmut Raion of Donetsk Oblast, eastern Ukraine. Administratively, it is part of Svitlodarsk urban hromada, one of the hromadas of Ukraine.

== History ==
On 28 April 2024, during the Russian invasion of Ukraine, the village was shelled by Russian forces.

== See also ==
- List of villages in Donetsk Oblast
