= Mykolaivka =

Mykolaivka (Ukrainian: Миколаївка) is one of the most common toponyms (place names) in Ukraine. The name is a diminutive derivative of Mykolaiv.

== City ==
- Mykolaivka, Donetsk Oblast, a city in Donetsk Oblast

== Urban-type settlements ==
- Mykolaivka, Simferopol Raion, an urban-type settlement in Simferopol Raion, Crimea
- Mykolaivka, Obukhivka settlement hromada, Dnipro Raion, Dnipropetrovsk Oblast, an urban-type settlement in Dnipro Raion, Dnipropetrovsk Oblast
- Mykolaivka, Karpivka rural hromada, Kryvyi Rih Raion, Dnipropetrovsk Oblast, a rural locality in Kryvyi Rih Raion, Dnipropetrovsk Oblast
- Mykolaivka, Donetsk Raion, Donetsk Oblast, an urban-type settlement in Donetsk Oblast
- Mykolaivka, Odesa Oblast, an urban-type settlement in Odesa Oblast, formerly Mykolaivka Druha
- Mykolaivka, Sumy Raion, Sumy Oblast, an urban-type settlement in Sumy Oblast, formerly Zhovtneve
- The former name of Novovorontsovka

== Villages ==
- Mykolaivka, Soledar urban hromada, Bakhmut Raion, Donetsk Oblast
- Mykolaivka, Svitlodarsk urban hromada, Bakhmut Raion, Donetsk Oblast
- Mykolaivka, Novohrodivka urban hromada, Pokrovsk Raion, Donetsk Oblast
- Mykolaivka, Luhansk Oblast
- Mykolaivka, Kharkiv Raion, Kharkiv Oblast, a village in Kharkiv Oblast, formerly Melyhivka
- Mykolaivka, Beryslav Raion, Kherson Oblast, a village in Kherson Oblast, on the north bank of the Dnipro river
- Mykolaivka, Kherson Raion, Kherson Oblast, a village in Kherson Oblast, 15 km east of the Dnipro river
- Mykolaivka, Bucha Raion, Kyiv Oblast, a village in Kyiv Oblast
- Mykolaivka, Vyshhorod Raion, Kyiv Oblast, a village in Kyiv Oblast
- Mykolaivka, Mykolaiv Oblast, a village in Mykolaiv Oblast
- Mykolaivka, Vinnytsia Oblast, a village in Vinnytsia Oblast, 50 km north of Vinnytsia

== Combined derivatives ==
- Mykolaivka Druha, Odesa Oblast
- Stara Mykolaivka, Kostiantynivka Raion, a Ukrainian toponym

== See also ==
- Mykolaiv (disambiguation)
