= Rozsadky =

Rozsadky Розсадки
- Village
- Location within Donetsk Oblast Location within Ukraine
- Coordinates: 48°25′49″N 38°21′1″E
- Country: Ukraine
- Oblast: Donetsk Oblast
- Raion: Bakhmut Raion
- Hromada: Svitlodarsk urban hromada
- Elevation: 218 m (715 ft)

Population
  - Total: 25
- Postal code: 84580
- Area code: +380-6274

Rozsadky (Ukrainian: Розсадки) is a village located in Bakhmut Raion of Donetsk Oblast, eastern Ukraine. Administratively, it is part of Svitlodarsk urban hromada, one of the hromadas of Ukraine.

== History ==
On 24 November 2018, during the War in Donbas, Ukrainian troops retook the village from separatist forces.

== See also ==
- List of villages in Donetsk Oblast
