= Odradivka, Donetsk Oblast =

Odradivka Одрадівка
- Village
- Location within Donetsk Oblast Location within Ukraine
- Coordinates: 48°30′11″N 38°01′11″E
- Country: Ukraine
- Oblast: Donetsk Oblast
- Raion: Bakhmut Raion
- Hromada: Svitlodarsk urban hromada
- Elevation: 162 m (531 ft)

Population
  - Total: 120
- Postal code: 84572
- Area code: +380-6274

Odradivka (Ukrainian: Одрадівка) is a village located in Bakhmut Raion of Donetsk Oblast, eastern Ukraine. Administratively, it is part of Svitlodarsk urban hromada, one of the hromadas of Ukraine.

== History ==
On 14 October 2022, during the Russian invasion of Ukraine, Russian attacks against the village were repelled by Ukrainian forces.

== See also ==
- List of villages in Donetsk Oblast
