= Lozove, Bakhmut Raion, Donetsk Oblast =

Lozove Лозове
- Village
- Interactive map of Lozove
- Location of Lozove within Ukraine Lozove (Ukraine)
- Coordinates: 48.378889°N 38.243889°E
- Country: Ukraine
- Oblast: Donetsk Oblast
- Raion: Bakhmut Raion
- Hromada: Svitlodarsk urban hromada

Area
  - Total: 1.416 km^{2} (0.547 sq mi)
- Elevation: 182 m (597 ft)

Population (2001 census)
  - Total: 48
  - Density: 34/km^{2} (88/sq mi)
- Time zone: UTC+2 (EET)
  - Summer (DST): UTC+3 (EEST)
- Postal code: 84580
- Area code: +380 6274

Lozove (Ukrainian: Лозове; Russian: Лозовое) is a village in the Bakhmut Raion of the Donetsk Oblast of eastern Ukraine.

== History ==
=== War in Donbas ===
The War in Donbas, that started in mid-April 2014, has brought along both civilian and military casualties.
