= Krynychne, Crimea =

Krynychne Криничне
- Village
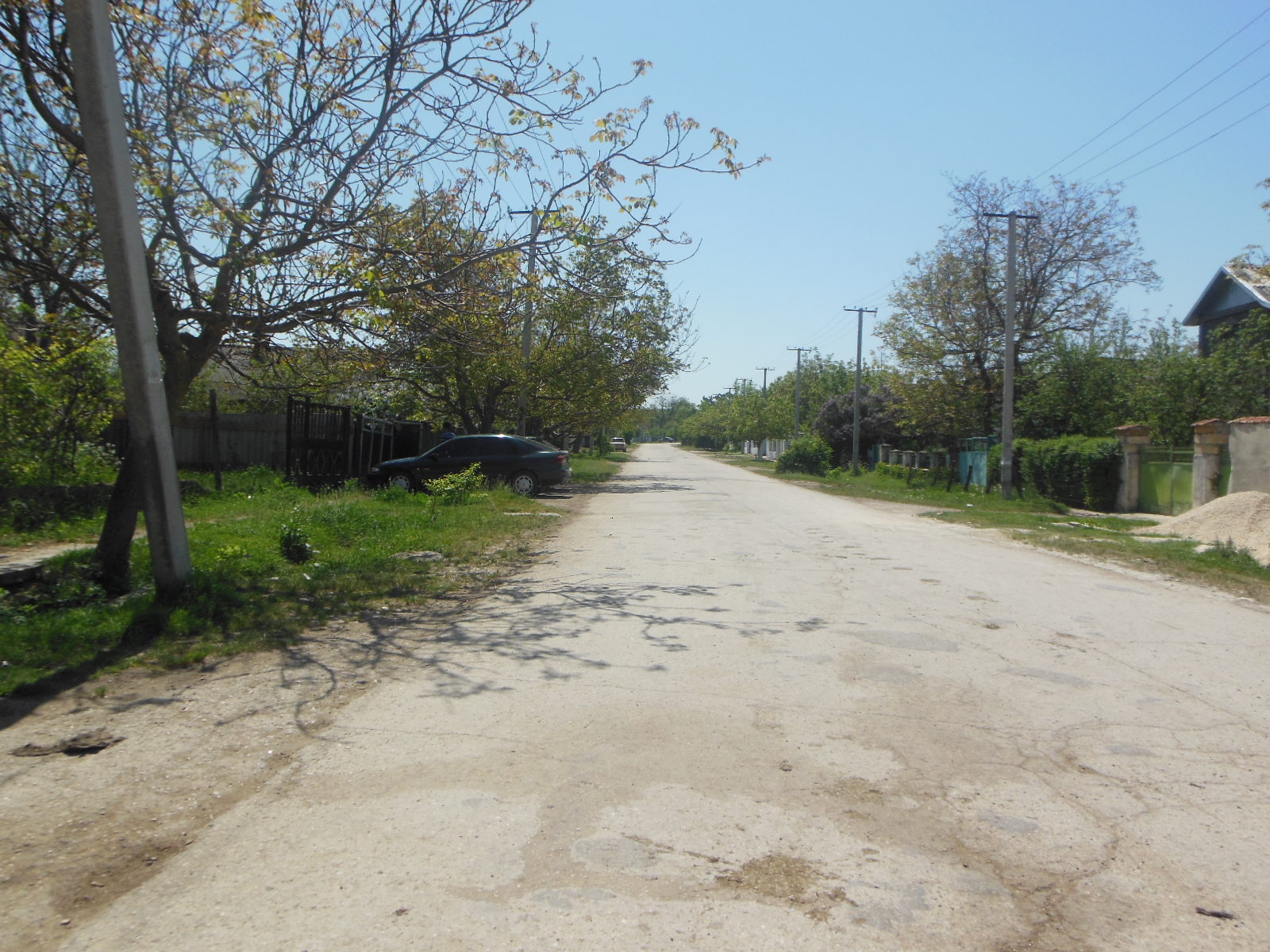

- Location of Krynychne in Crimea
- Coordinates: 45°01′28″N 34°36′45″E
- Country: Disputed; Russia, Ukraine
- Republic: Crimea
- Raion: Bilohirsk
- Elevation: 231 m (758 ft)

Population (2014)
  - Total: 898
- Time zone: UTC+4 (MSK)
- Postal code: 97643
- Area code: +380 6559

Krynychne (Ukrainian: Криничне; Russian: Криничное; Crimean Tatar: Kriniçnoye) is a village in the Bilohirsk Raion of Crimea. Population: 431 (2014 Census).
