= Krynychne, Bakhmut Raion, Donetsk Oblast =

Krynychne Криничне
- Village
- Location within Donetsk Oblast Location within Ukraine
- Coordinates: 48°30′34″N 38°16′20″E
- Country: Ukraine
- Oblast: Donetsk Oblast
- Raion: Bakhmut Raion
- Hromada: Svitlodarsk urban hromada
- Elevation: 182 m (597 ft)

Population
  - Total: 33
- Postal code: 84580
- Area code: +380-6274

Krynychne (Ukrainian: Криничне) is a village located in Bakhmut Raion of Donetsk Oblast, eastern Ukraine. Administratively, it is part of Svitlodarsk urban hromada, one of the hromadas of Ukraine.

== History ==
On 7 June 2022, during the Russian invasion of Ukraine, Russian forces launched unsuccessful offensives towards the village.

== See also ==
- List of villages in Donetsk Oblast
