= Svitlodarsk urban hromada =

Svitlodarsk urban hromada Світлодарська міська громада
- Hromada
- Interactive map of Svitlodarsk urban hromada
- Country: Ukraine
- Oblast: Donetsk Oblast
- Raion: Bakhmut Raion

Area
  - Total: 297.7 km^{2} (114.9 sq mi)

Population (2020)
  - Total: 29,167
  - Density: 97.97/km^{2} (253.8/sq mi)
- Settlements: 19
- Cities: 1
- Rural settlements: 7
- Villages: 11

Svitlodarsk urban hromada (Ukrainian: Світлодарська міська громада) is a hromada of Ukraine, located in Bakhmut Raion, Donetsk Oblast. Its administrative center is the city Svitlodarsk.

It has an area of 297.7 square kilometres (114.9 mi^{2}) and a population of 29,167, as of 2020. On 8 September 2020, the hromada was divided into four local electoral districts.

The hromada contains 19 settlements: 1 city (Svitlodarsk), 11 villages:

- Vozdvyzhenka
- Dacha
- Kodema
- Krynychne
- Mykolaivka
- Mykolaivka Druha
- Lozove
- Myronivka
- Odradivka
- Rozsadky
- Semyhiria

And 7 rural settlements: Luhanske, Myronivskyi, Hladosove, Dolomitne, Novoluhanske, Roty, and Travneve.

== See also ==
- List of hromadas of Ukraine
