= Vovkove, Donetsk Oblast =

Village in Donetsk Oblast, Ukraine

Vovkove Вовкове
- Village
- Location within Donetsk Oblast Location within Ukraine
- Coordinates: 48°13′47″N 37°04′40″E
- Country: Ukraine
- Oblast: Donetsk Oblast
- Raion: Pokrovsk Raion

Population (2001)
  - Total: 23
  - Estimate (2020): ▼16
- Time zone: UTC+2 (EET)
  - Summer (DST): UTC+3 (EEST)

Vovkove (Ukrainian: Вовкове) is a village in Pokrovsk Raion of Donetsk Oblast in Ukraine. The settlement has been under Russian occupation since January 2025.

== History ==
During the Russo-Ukrainian War and the Russian invasion of Ukraine, the settlement came in proximity of fighting in light of a renewed offensive towards Pokrovsk in late 2024. On 3 January 2025, DeepStateMap.Live reported the settlement to be captured by Russian forces.

== Demographics ==
Native language as of the Ukrainian Census of 2001:

- Ukrainian 69.57%
- Russian 30.43%
