= Dacha, Donetsk Oblast =

Dacha Дача
- Village
- Location within Donetsk Oblast Location within Ukraine
- Coordinates: 48°26′32″N 38°2′34″E
- Country: Ukraine
- Oblast: Donetsk Oblast
- Raion: Bakhmut Raion
- Hromada: Svitlodarsk urban hromada
- Elevation: 137 m (449 ft)

Population
  - Total: 14
- Postal code: 84572
- Area code: +380-6274

Dacha (Ukrainian: Дача) is a village located in Bakhmut Raion of Donetsk Oblast, eastern Ukraine. Administratively, it is part of Svitlodarsk urban hromada, one of the hromadas of Ukraine.

== History ==
On 17 January 2018, during the War in Donbas, the Rinat Akhmetov Humanitarian Center reported that it provided humanitarian support to the village. Russian forces captured the village on 19 August 2022 during the Russian invasion of Ukraine.

== See also ==
- List of villages in Donetsk Oblast
