= Novooleksandrivka, Kramatorsk Raion, Donetsk Oblast =

Novooleksandrivka Новоолександрівка
- Village
- Location of Novooleksandrivka within Ukraine
- Coordinates: 48°45′59″N 36°50′59″E
- Country: Ukraine
- Oblast: Donetsk Oblast
- District: Oleksandrivka Raion
- Elevation: 173 m (568 ft)

Population (2001 census)
  - Total: 413
- Time zone: UTC+2 (EET)
  - Summer (DST): UTC+3 (EEST)
- Postal code: 84010
- Area code: +380 6269

Novooleksandrivka (Ukrainian: Новоолександрівка; Russian: Новоалександровка) is a village in Oleksandrivka Raion (district) in Donetsk Oblast of eastern Ukraine. The village borders in NW with Kharkiv Oblast.
