= Mykolaivka Druha, Donetsk Oblast =

Mykolaivka Druha Миколаївка Друга
- Village
- Location within Donetsk Oblast Location within Ukraine
- Coordinates: 48°28′15″N 38°0′47″E
- Country: Ukraine
- Oblast: Donetsk Oblast
- Raion: Bakhmut Raion
- Hromada: Svitlodarsk urban hromada
- Elevation: 192 m (630 ft)

Population
  - Total: 6
- Postal code: 84572
- Area code: +380-6274

Mykolaivka Druha (Ukrainian: Миколаївка Друга) is a village located in Bakhmut Raion of Donetsk Oblast, eastern Ukraine. Administratively, it is part of Svitlodarsk urban hromada, one of the hromadas of Ukraine.

== History ==
On 20 September 2022, during the Russian invasion of Ukraine, Ukrainian forces reportedly repelled Russian attacks towards the village.

== See also ==
- List of villages in Donetsk Oblast
