= Mykolaivka, Svitlodarsk urban hromada, Bakhmut Raion, Donetsk Oblast =

Mykolaivka Миколаївка
- Village
- Location within Donetsk Oblast Location within Ukraine
- Coordinates: 48°29′9″N 38°1′57″E
- Country: Ukraine
- Oblast: Donetsk Oblast
- Raion: Bakhmut Raion
- Hromada: Svitlodarsk urban hromada

Population
  - Total: 13
- Postal code: 84572
- Area code: +380-6274

Mykolaivka (Ukrainian: Миколаївка) is a village located in Bakhmut Raion of Donetsk Oblast, eastern Ukraine. Administratively, it is part of Svitlodarsk urban hromada, one of the hromadas of Ukraine.

== History ==
On 11 September 2022, during the Russian invasion of Ukraine, Russian Wagner forces captured two wounded Ukrainian soldiers of the Aidar Battalion near the village and summarily executed one of them.

== See also ==
- List of villages in Donetsk Oblast
