= Karpivka, Oleksandrivka settlement hromada, Kramatorsk Raion, Donetsk Oblast =

Village in Donetsk Oblast, Ukraine

Karpivka Карпівка
- Village
- Interactive map of Karpivka
- Karpivka in Donetsk Oblast Karpivka (Ukraine)
- Coordinates: 48°47′39″N 36°44′00″E
- Country: Ukraine
- Oblast: Donetsk Oblast
- Raion: Kramatorsk Raion
- Hromada: Oleksandrivka settlement hromada

Area
  - Total: 0.579 km^{2} (0.224 sq mi)
- Elevation: 178 m (584 ft)

Population (2001 census)
  - Total: 119
  - Density: 206/km^{2} (532/sq mi)
- Time zone: UTC+2 (EET)
  - Summer (DST): UTC+3 (EEST)
- Postal code: 84010
- Area code: +380 6269

Karpivka (Ukrainian: Карпівка; Russian: Карповка) is a village in Kramatorsk Raion (district) in Donetsk Oblast of eastern Ukraine. It belongs to Oleksandrivka settlement hromada, one of the hromadas of Ukraine.

Until 18 July 2020, Karpivka belonged to Oleksandrivka Raion. The raion was abolished in July 2020 as part of the administrative reform of Ukraine, which reduced the number of raions of Donetsk Oblast to eight, of which only five were controlled by the government. The area of Oleksandrivka Raion was merged into Kramatorsk Raion.

== Demographics ==
As of the 2001 Ukrainian census, the town had a population of 119. The native languages in the settlement were as follows:

Native languages in Shandrygolove
	percent
Ukrainian	88.24%
Russian	11.76%
