= Battle of Kostiantynivka =

2025–2026 battle in the Russo-Ukrainian war

- Part of the eastern front of the Russo-Ukrainian war (2022–present)
Date	25 October 2025 – present (1 year, 3 weeks and 2 days)
Location	Kostiantynivka, Donetsk Oblast, Ukraine 48°32′N 37°43′E
Status	Ongoing

Belligerents
Russia	Ukraine

Units involved
Russian Armed Forces: 70th Motorized Rifle Division; 4th Motorized Rifle Brigade; 72nd Motorized Rifle Brigade; Center for Advanced Unmanned Technologies "Rubicon"	Armed Forces of Ukraine: 24th Mechanized Brigade; 28th Mechanized Brigade; 93rd Mechanized Brigade; 129th Mechanized Brigade

The Battle of Kostiantynivka is an ongoing military engagement in the Russo-Ukrainian war between the Russian Armed Forces and the Armed Forces of Ukraine for control over the Ukrainian city of Kostiantynivka.

== Background ==
After the Russian capture of Toretsk in August 2025, its troops continued launching assaults to the northwest in the direction of Kostiantynivka. By 23 August, Russian forces captured the village of Kleban-Byk, located in between the cities of Toretsk and Kostiantynivka.

== Battle ==
=== Early infiltrations and fight for the southeast (October – December 2025) ===
The first Russian infiltration attempts into Kostiantynivka occurred at the end of October 2025. Russian assault groups began entering the city from the southeast. The Ukrainian 28th Mechanized Brigade managed to thwart one of these attempts. An estimated 4,800 residents remained in the city by early November. On 21 November, Russian forces seized the village of Ivanopillia located to the south of Kostiantynivka. Furthermore, its troops were able to advance in the southeastern parts of the city.

In early December, the Russian army made further advances into southeastern Kostiantynivka along Mahistralna Street. Meanwhile, the remaining residents struggled to survive in their damaged homes. The Ukrainian Ministry of Internal Affairs released footage which showed the destruction of the city. At the same time, Russian units reached Kustanaiska Street in southeastern Kostiantynivka. Russian chief of the General Staff, Valery Gerasimov, claimed on 18 December that Russia controls 50 percent of Kostiantynivka. While the Institute for the Study of War (ISW) estimated that Russia controls about 5 percent of the city. At the end of December, Russian forces captured a trench system in eastern Kostiantynivka, thus reaching the T-0504 Bakhmut – Pokrovsk highway. Moreover, its troops started advancing along Ostrovskoho Street towards the railway station. Further south, Ukrainian forces repelled Russian attacks from Ivanopillia in the direction of southern Kostiantynivka.

=== Entrance into the eastern and western outskirts (January – May 2026) ===
Military situation in and around Kostiantynivka, as of 5 January 2026

At the beginning of 2026, Russian forces began launching assaults from Yablunivka to southwestern Kostiantynivka, through the H-20 Donetsk – Kramatorsk highway. Soldiers of the Ukrainian 24th Mechanized Brigade installed anti-drone nets above several roads around the city to protect their resupply. Analysts noted that the seizure of Kostiantynivka is part of Russia’s 2026 war priority. Russian units infiltrated toward the village of Illinivka located to the west of Kostiantynivka by 17 January. In addition, its forces attempted to gain a foothold in the most western districts of the city. South of Kostiantynivka, Russian forces claimed to have captured Berestok. In the subsequent weeks, the Russian army intensified their efforts to strike Ukrainian logistics towards the city. The ISW assessed on 16 February that Ukrainian forces no longer maintain positions to the south of Berestok. This resulted in full Russian control over the Kleban-Byk Reservoir. Russian forces struck the dam near the settlement of Osykove causing flooding in the area. This made the road connecting Oleksiievo-Druzhkivka and Kostiantynivka impassible, further complicating Ukrainian logistics towards the city.

Meanwhile in downtown Kostiantynivka, Ukrainian troops captured a Russian soldier near the railway station, indicating Ukrainian control over the central station. Ukrainian forces successfully repelled Russian assaults on the city throughout March 2026. Geolocations of video footage shows that Russian and Ukrainian positions inside Kostiantynivka are interspersed, making the exact frontline hard to determine. Russian units managed to reach the zinc plant in central Kostiantynivka following an infiltration operation. An estimated 2,500 residents still lived in the city by April 2026. Ukrainian commander Oleksandr Syrskyi noted that Russia was increasing its assaults on the city by the end of the month. In early May, Russian infiltration groups were operating in Illinivka and along Heroiv Pratsi Street in western Kostiantynivka. The Ukrainian army pushed Russian troops back near Illinivka by 20 May. In the meantime, humanitarian teams continued evacuating the remaining residents while being under constant enemy drone presence. As the city is located in the middle of the kill zone, many of Kostiantynivka's buildings are damaged and unrecognizable. The New York Times drew the comparison that Kostiantynivka will meet the same fate as other eastern Ukrainian cities, such as Bakhmut and Pokrovsk.

=== Battle for central Kostiantynivka (June 2026 – present) ===
At the start of June, Russian forces penetrated deeper into Kostiantynivka igniting heavy urban fighting. The Russian army began pushing from both the western and eastern direction toward the city center. On 10 June, the ISW reported that Russian forces made tactical gains in eastern Kostiantynivka by entering the village of Novodmytrivka. The commander of the Ukrainian 28th Mechanized Brigade told Hromadske that Ukrainian forces are in a semi-encirclement as a result of these advances in the east. A Ukrainian military observer warned that Russia may capture the city by the end of summer 2026. Two days later, local Ukrainian commanders stated to Hromadske that up to 250 Russian troops were present inside the city, therefore surpassing the phase of infiltration. At the same time, the Russian 4th Motorized Rifle Brigade released geolocated footage of several flag displays by their units throughout the western and central parts of Kostiantynivka. The ISW additionally assessed that Russian forces had consolidated their positions in southern Kostiantynivka up to the T-0504 highway.

One week later, Russian units reached the Kryvyi Torets river with the seizure of the Metallurgical Plant in central Kostiantynivka. Ukrainian soldiers told the BBC that the entire city effectively turned into 'a grey zone'. They added that the Russian army advanced into Kostiantynivka from the south and started operating in the northern outskirts. Military analysts began assessing that the city is on the verge of falling into Russian hands.

On 3 July, the Russian Defence Ministry announced the full capture of Kostiantynivka. Russian general Valery Gerasimov told the announcement to Russian president Vladimir Putin during a visit of a command post. The following day, Ukraine rejected the Russian claims and denied that Russia is in complete control of Kostiantynivka. Ukrainian president Volodymyr Zelenskyy added that the report is "just another Russian lie to create a news story". Zelenskyy additionally challenged Putin to meet him in Kostiantynivka and called for finding diplomatic solutions to end the war. In response, Russia proposed a temporary ceasefire in Kostiantynivka to handover the bodies of fallen Ukrainian service members. Russia alleged that this local ceasefire was rejected by Ukraine.

In the following weeks, both sides continued to claim to be in control of Kostiantynivka. According to Meduza, neither Russia nor Ukraine is correct, stating that both forces hold positions inside the city center. Ukrainian military observer Kostyantyn Mashovets reported that Russian forces advanced north of the railway station, while fighting continued for the Metalurh Park and Metalurh Stadium in central Kostiantynivka. On 8 July, the ISW reported that a Ukrainian Brigade commander reported that Russian forces had conducted 10 to 15 mechanized assaults in the last three months, but did not advance. He claimed that Russian company commanders were still instructing their soldiers to advance, despite losing 300 to 400 soldiers "without accomplishing any objectives". He also claimed that Russian forces had lost 1,200 soldiers fighting for Rusyn Yar, but failed to capture the settlement. On 18 July, the Ukrainian 425th Skelya Regiment claimed to have cleared Kostiantynivka from Russian troops, publishing a video showing its soldiers waving a Ukrainian flag inside one of the buildings in the city center. The next day, Russia announced that it had captured the Ukrainian soldiers. Skelya confirmed that the soldiers are its service members by 20 July. The attack was later labelled as a flag-raising operation.

As of 22 July, the control over Kostiantynivka remains contested per the ISW, while up to 145 Russian troops remained present in the city as stated by the Ukrainian military. At the end of July, Russian forces advanced on the right bank of the Kryvyi Torets river toward northern Kostiantynivka, with the first Russian infiltration groups reaching the southern outskirts of the neighboring town of Oleksiievo-Druzhkivka. Three Ukrainian soldiers told Hromadske that the situation in Kostiantynivka is worsening and that logistics into the city have become "nearly impossible".

== Casualties ==
On 23 August 2026, President Zelenskyy claimed that Russian forces had suffered 267,000 casualties along the entire front since the beginning of the year, including 155,000 killed, and that 70 to 80 percent of all Russian losses occurred in the Kostyantynivka direction.

== Analysis ==
=== Strategic value ===
Kostiantynivka is a part of Ukraine's fortress belt. This is a network of the four cities of Sloviansk, Kramatorsk, Druzhkivka and Kostiantynivka itself, functioning as the main defensive line of the Ukrainian army in the Donbas region. Analysts describe Kostiantynivka as a "backbone for Ukraine's defense" and a gateway for Russia to seize the remainder of the Donetsk region.

=== Tactics ===
DeepStateMap noted that the Russian army used similar tactics as in their Pokrovsk offensive, exerting intense pressure from multiple sides while simultaneously sending small groups of infantry into the city. The Institute of the Study of War (ISW) assessed on 15 June that it has indications that some of the Russian flag-raising videos may be AI-generated to exaggerate tactical successes in Kostiantynivka. According to The Kyiv Independent, the deployment of Rubicon to the Kostiantynivka area was causing "a drastic worsening of Ukrainian front line logistics," mirroring the situation of Ukrainian supply lines during the Pokrovsk offensive.

== See also ==
- Battle of Bakhmut
- Battle of Chasiv Yar
- Battle of Popasna
