= Raiske =

Raiske (Ukrainian: Райське) may refer to several places in Ukraine:

- Raiske (rural settlement), Donetsk Oblast
- Raiske (village), Donetsk Oblast
- Raiske, Kherson Oblast
- Raiske, Zaporizhzhia Oblast
