= Romanivka, Kramatorsk Raion, Donetsk Oblast =

Rural locality in Donetsk Oblast, Ukraine

Romanivka Романівка
- Village
- Interactive map of Romanivka
- Location of Romanivka within Ukraine Romanivka (Donetsk Oblast)
- Coordinates: 48°21′56″N 37°43′18″E
- Country: Ukraine
- Oblast: Donetsk Oblast
- Raion: Kramatorsk Raion
- Hromada: Illinivka rural hromada
- Founded: 1889
- Elevation: 166 m (545 ft)

Population (2001 census)
  - Total: 150
- Time zone: UTC+2 (EET)
  - Summer (DST): UTC+3 (EEST)
- Postal code: 85158
- Area code: +380 6272
- KATOTTH: UA14120050150090714

Romanivka (Ukrainian: Романівка; Russian: Романовка) is a village in Illinivka rural hromada, Kramatorsk Raion, Donetsk Oblast, eastern Ukraine. It is located 39.46 kilometres (24.52 mi) northwest by north (NWbN) from the centre of Donetsk city, 10.37 kilometres (6.44 mi) west-southwest (WSW) of Toretsk.

== Geography ==
The village lies on Sukhyi Yar river, a left tributary of the Kryvyi Torets river. The absolute height is 188 metres above sea level.

== History ==
The settlement was founded in 1889 under the Russian Empire.

On November 7 1917, in accordance with the Third Universal of the Ukrainian Central Rada, it became part of the Ukrainian People's Republic.

=== Russian invasion of Ukraine ===
The village was captured by Russian forces on 27 May 2025, during the full-scale Russian invasion of Ukraine.

== Demographics ==
As of the 2001 Ukrainian census, the settlement had 150 inhabitants, whose native languages were 80.65% Ukrainian, 15.48% Russian and 3.23% Belarusian.

== See also ==
- List of villages in Donetsk Oblast
