= Krasnyi Kut =

Krasnyi Kut (Ukrainian: Красний Кут) may refer to the following places in Ukraine:

- Krasnyi Kut, Donetsk Oblast, village in Kramatorsk Raion
- Krasnyi Kut, Luhansk Oblast, urban-type settlement in Antratsyt Raion
