= Oleksandro-Kalynove =

Rural locality in Donetsk Oblast, Ukraine

Oleksandro-Kalynove Олександро-Калинове
- Village
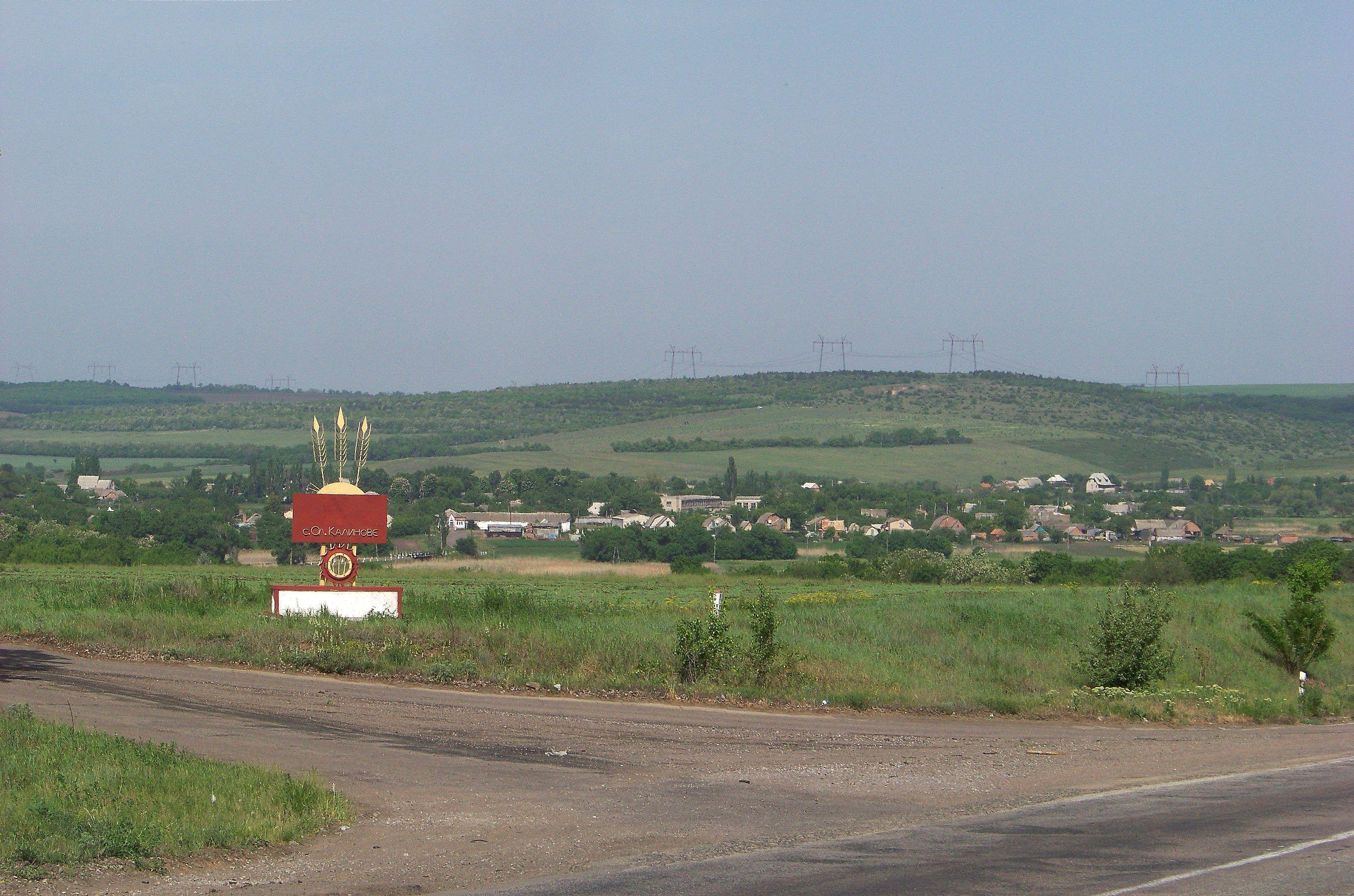
- Landscape of the village of Oleksandro-Kalinove
- Interactive map of Oleksandro-Kalynove
- Location of Piddubne within Ukraine Oleksandro-Kalynove (Donetsk Oblast)
- Coordinates: 48°24′46″N 37°40′24″E
- Country: Ukraine
- Oblast: Donetsk Oblast
- Raion: Kramatorsk Raion
- Hromada: Illinivka rural hromada
- Founded: 1757
- Elevation: 115 m (377 ft)

Population (2001 census)
  - Total: 864
- Time zone: UTC+2 (EET)
  - Summer (DST): UTC+3 (EEST)
- Postal code: 85142
- Area code: +380 6272
- KATOTTH: UA14120050100023805

Oleksandro-Kalynove (Ukrainian: Олександро-Калинове; Russian: Александро-Калиново) is a village in Illinivka rural hromada, Kramatorsk Raion, Donetsk Oblast, eastern Ukraine. It is located 44.92 km (27.91 mi) northwest by north (NWbN) from the centre of Donetsk city, 13.53 km (8.41 mi) west by north (WbN) from Toretsk.

== Geography ==
The settlement is located on both banks of the Kalynivka River and the Kleban-Byk River, left tributary of Kryvyi Torets. The Kleban-Byk Reservoir and the Kleban-Byk Regional Landscape Park are located nearby.

The absolute height is 115 metres above sea level.

== History ==
Date of foundation — 1711.

=== Russian invasion of Ukraine ===
The village came under attack and was later occupied by Russian forces in July 2025, during the full-scale Russian invasion of Ukraine.

== Demographics ==
As of the 2001 Ukrainian census, the settlement had 864 inhabitants, whose native languages were 89.35% Ukrainian and 10.65% Russian.

== See also ==
- List of villages in Donetsk Oblast
