= Druzhkivka urban hromada =

Druzhkivka urban hromada Дружківська міська громада
- Hromada
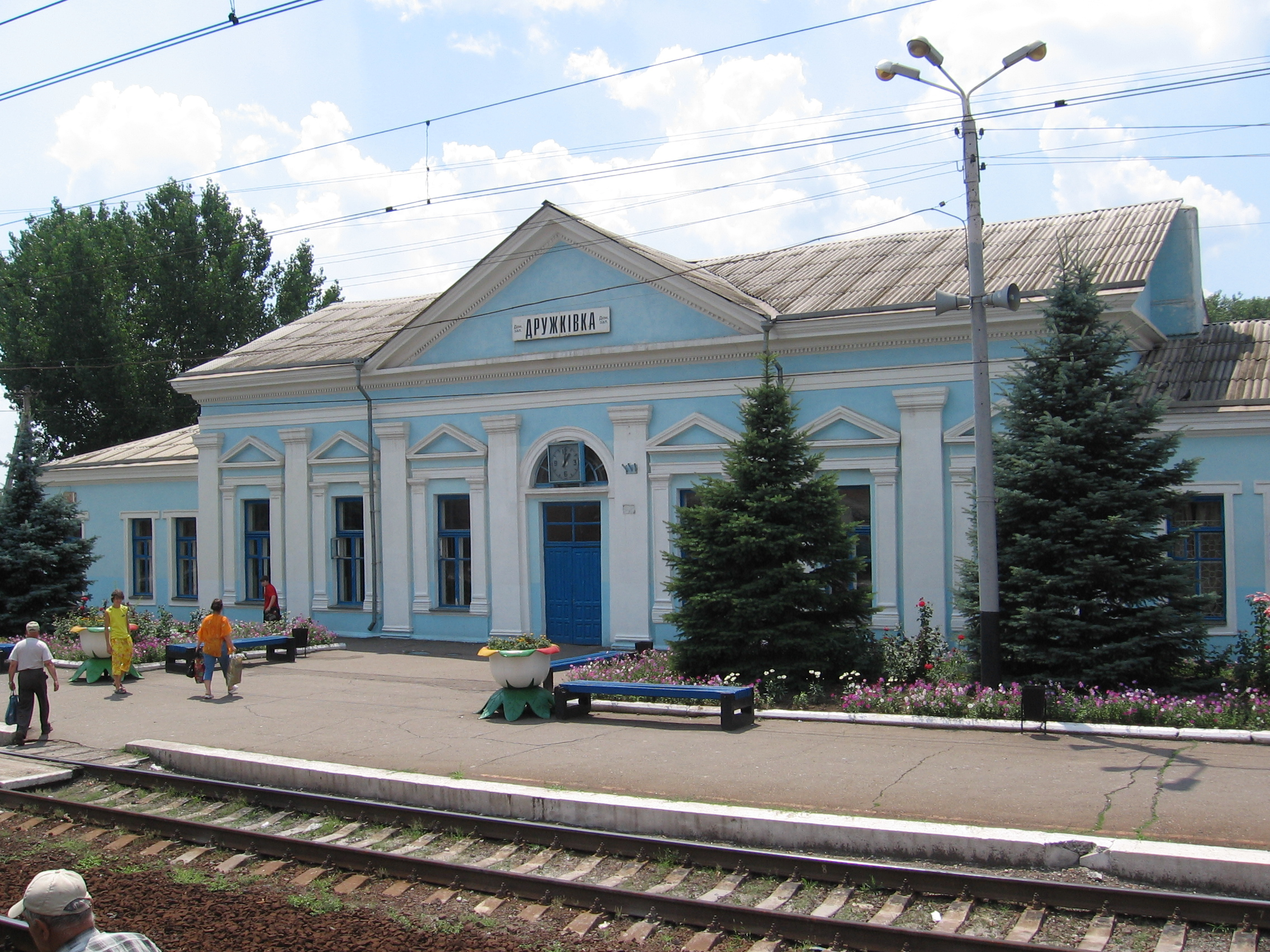
- Railway station in Druzhkivka
- Interactive map of Druzhkivka urban hromada
- Country: Ukraine
- Oblast: Donetsk Oblast
- Raion: Kramatorsk Raion

Area
  - Total: 289.3 km^{2} (111.7 sq mi)

Population (2020)
  - Total: 66,823
  - Density: 231.0/km^{2} (598.2/sq mi)
- Settlements: 20
- Cities: 1
- Rural settlements: 6
- Villages: 13

Druzhkivka urban hromada (Ukrainian: Дружківська міська громада) is a hromada of Ukraine, located in Kramatorsk Raion, Donetsk Oblast. Its administrative center is the city Druzhkivka.

It has an area of 289.3 square kilometres (111.7 mi^{2}) and a population of 66,823, as of 2020.

The hromada contains 20 settlements: 1 city (Druzhkivka), 4 rural settlements:

- Novohryhorivka
- Novomykolaivka
- Oleksiievo-Druzhkivka
- Pryiut
- Raiske
- Staroraiske

And 13 villages:

- Druzhkivske
- Kindrativka
- Krasnyi Kut
- Kurtivka
- Mykolaipillia
- Novopavlivka
- Osykove
- Pavlivka
- Petrivka
- Raiske
- Sofiivka
- Toretske
- Torske

== See also ==
- List of hromadas of Ukraine
