= Center for Advanced Unmanned Technologies "Rubicon" =

Russian military formation

- Центр перспективных беспилотных технологий «Рубикон»
- Emblem of the unit
- Active: 2 August 2024 – present
- Country: Russia
- Type: Drone warfare
- Size: ~5,000
- Part of: Unmanned Systems Forces
- Garrison/HQ: Patriot Park, Kubinka, Moscow Oblast
- Engagements: Russo-Ukrainian war (2022–present): Kursk campaign; 2025 Sumy offensive; Pokrovsk offensive; Novopavlivka offensive; Battle of Kostiantynivka

Insignia
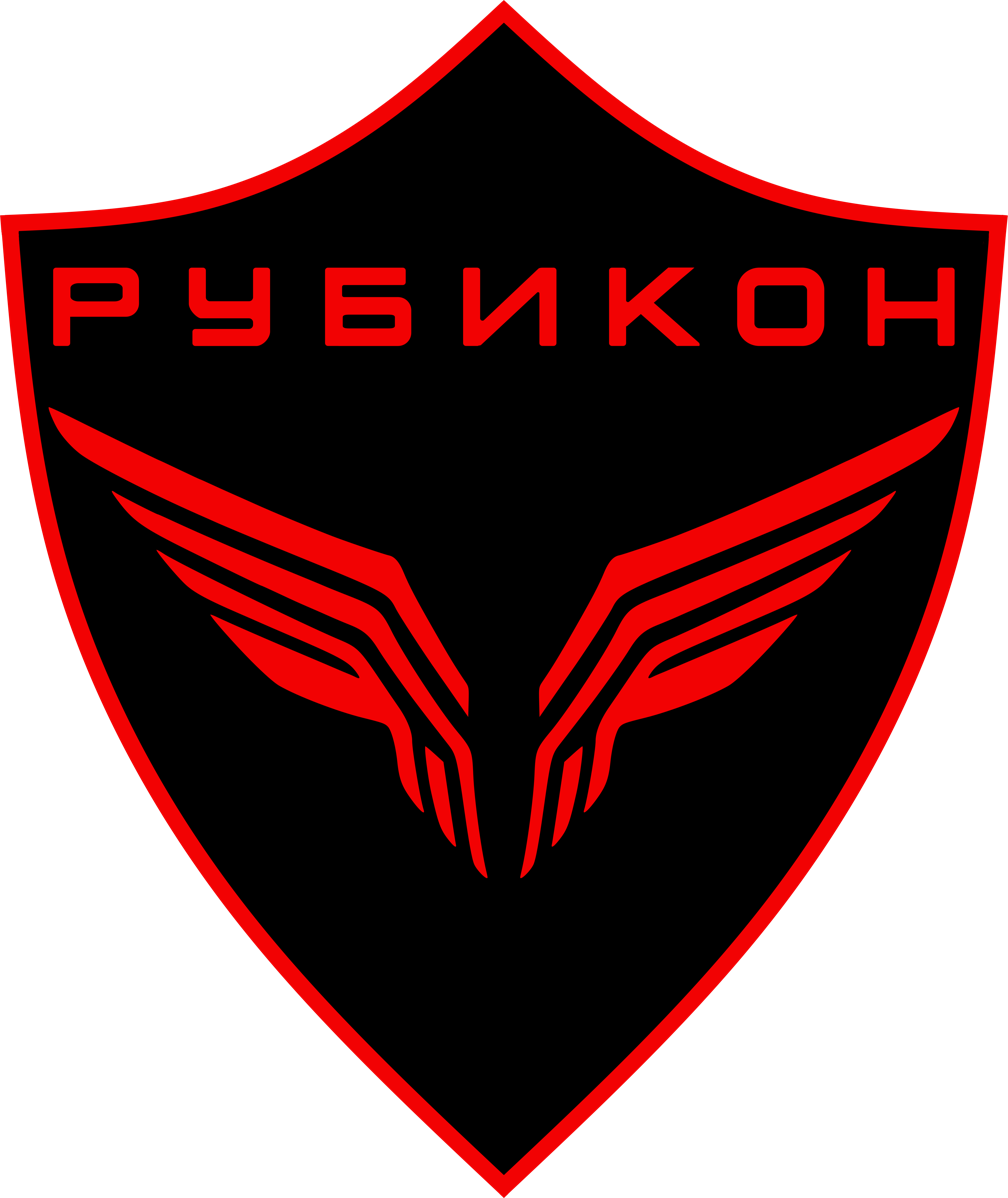
- Patch

The Center for Advanced Unmanned Technologies "Rubicon" (Russian: Центр перспективных беспилотных технологий «Рубикон») is a Russian military unit formed in August 2024 on the orders of Defence Minister Andrey Belousov. It is specialised in drone warfare and has been engaged in the Russo-Ukrainian war, fighting in different sections of the front. The unit has been widely described as one of the most effective drone warfare units in Russia.

== History ==
Center for Advanced Unmanned Technologies "Rubicon" was established in August 2024, following the directive of Defence Minister Andrey Belousov. The primary objective of the centre was to train highly skilled instructors in the realm of unmanned aviation, with the aim of transferring their expertise to personnel in active formations and military units. Additionally, the centre aims to prepare unmanned aerial vehicle operators for combat operations, both individually and as part of teams.

The centre also develops and tests advanced drone systems and their implementation and conducts research into the field of artificial intelligence and explores how it can be utilized in robotic systems.

The existence of Rubicon first became known in October 2024, when Belousov visited the center.

The General Staff of the Ukrainian Armed Forces have reported several strikes targeting the unit since August 2025, when it reported the destruction of a Rubicon command post in Donetsk. In November 2025, the Kyiv Post said that the Ukrainian Main Directorate of Intelligence had uncovered and destroyed a building used as a headquarters by the unit in Avdiivka. Another Rubicon command post near the village of Vysoke in the Zaporizhzhia region was also reported to have been struck in February 2026. In May 2026, the Ukrainian General Staff said a Rubicon headquarters in Staroblisk had been struck, while Russia said that the strike had instead killed civilians.

In February 2026, the Ukrainian Defense Ministry's intelligence-backed project ″I Want to Live″ published an interview with a Russian serviceman who said he had served in the Rubicon unit before voluntarily crossing into Ukrainian territory and surrendering. In the interview, he described the structure and internal practices of Rubicon, and said he decided to flee after seeing the reaction within the unit after a drone strike allegedly hit incorrect coordinates and killed a civilian girl in Kupiansk.

== Organization ==
According to the Foreign Policy Research Institute, as of spring 2025, the unit comprised seven squads of 130–150 personnel each. These squads are specialized; some focus on operating FPV or Molniya drones, while others concentrate on intercepting Ukrainian reconnaissance or heavy bomber drones. The squads are deployed to various sectors to reinforce local forces and train their UAV detachments. As of November 2025, the unit size was estimated at around 5,000 servicemen.

According to a 17 September 2025 report by Radio Liberty, the unit is headquartered within the exhibition halls of Patriot Park in Moscow Oblast. It is commanded by Guards Colonel Sergei Budnikov, the former Chief of Staff of the 9th Guards Artillery Brigade. Recruits are selected in Moscow before being assigned to their respective squads for training.

== Operations ==
The unit was first deployed to Kursk Oblast, where it played a significant role in disrupting Ukrainian supply routes, aiding Russian forces in pushing the AFU out of the area. Since January 2025, the unit has been active in the Belgorod, Kupiansk, Pokrovsk, Kharkiv, Vuhledar, and South Donetsk directions. From May 2025, the unit has been operating mostly in Donetsk Oblast, supporting the Russian offensive. Rubicon provided support for Russian units infiltrating Pokrovsk.

Ukrainian troops interviewed by NYT emphasize that Rubicon drone unit has dramatically shifted the battlefield, relentlessly striking supply lines and vehicles up to 15 kilometers behind the front—a tactical edge Kyiv struggles to counter. "The game changed when they came here," said one American volunteer, as Ukrainian forces face escalating losses and disrupted operations under Rubicon's precision attacks.

The unit reportedly focuses on targeting Ukrainian drone operators and logistics rather than frontline infantry. According to the FPRI, the unit has strong signals intelligence capabilities, which allows it to locate and strike Ukrainian drones and their operators, reportedly destroying up to 70% of UAV positions in some areas.

According to The Kyiv Independent, the deployment of Rubicon to the Kostiantynivka area was causing "a drastic worsening of Ukrainian front line logistics," mirroring the situation of Ukrainian supply lines during the Pokrovsk offensive.

== Equipment ==
Rubicon unit reportedly uses following equipment:

- Lancet and Kub loitering munitions by Zala
- Regular and fiber optic FPV drones (most notably VT-40 and KVN)
- Recon drones (Orlan, SuperCam, Voron)
- Unmanned surface vehicles (Shkval)

== Gallery ==
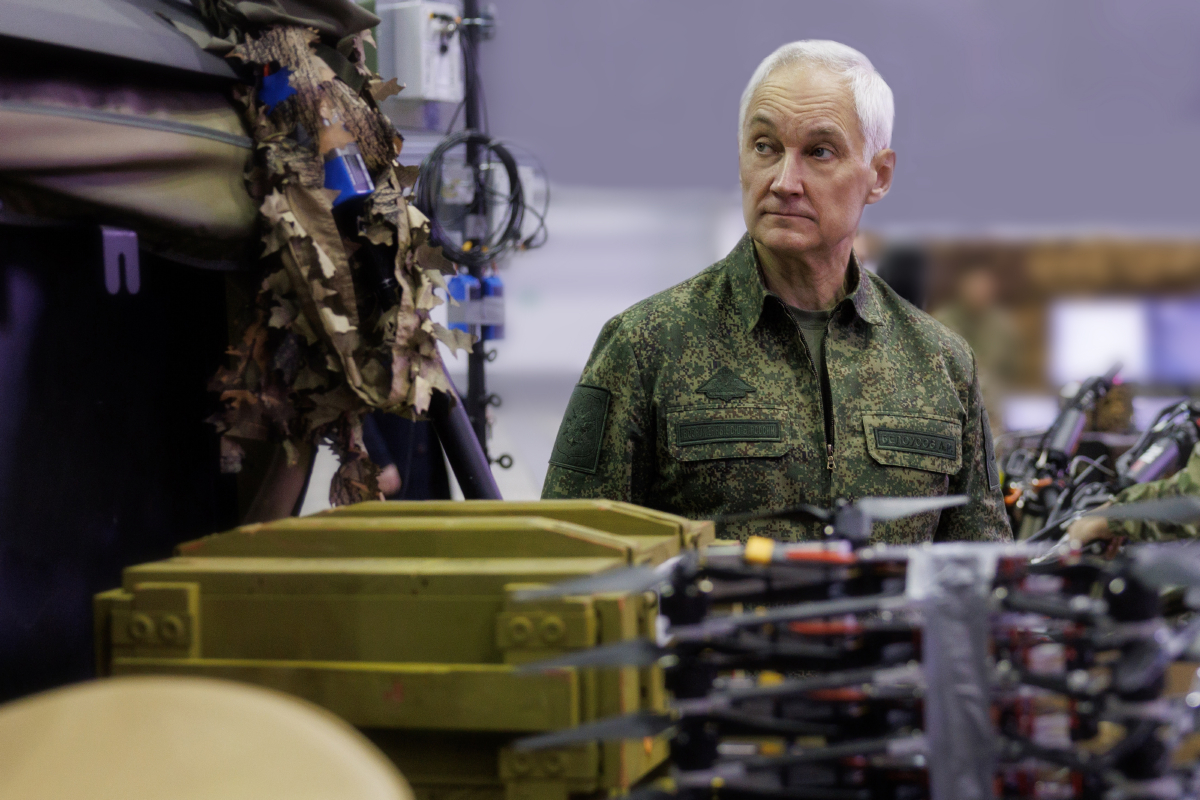
Andrey Belousov inspecting the unit

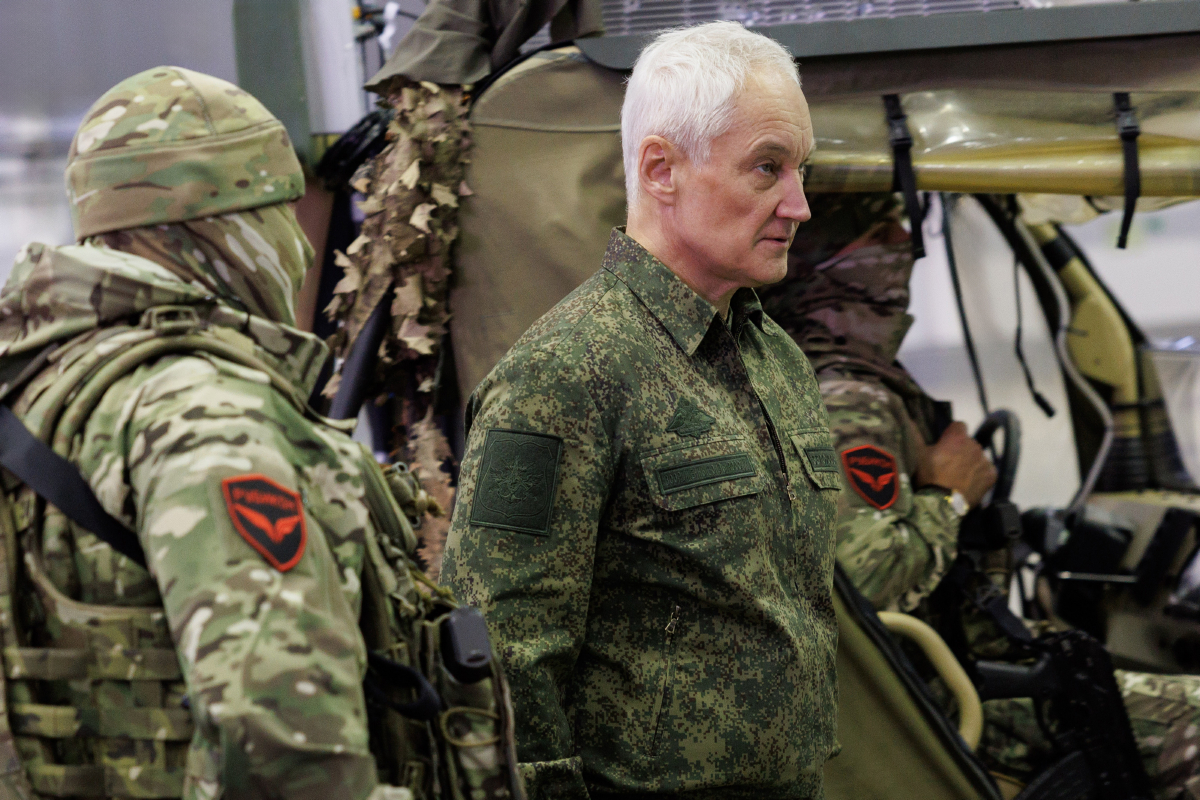
Andrey Belousov inspecting the unit
