= Druzhkivka =

City in Donetsk Oblast, Ukraine

Druzhkivka Дружківка
- City
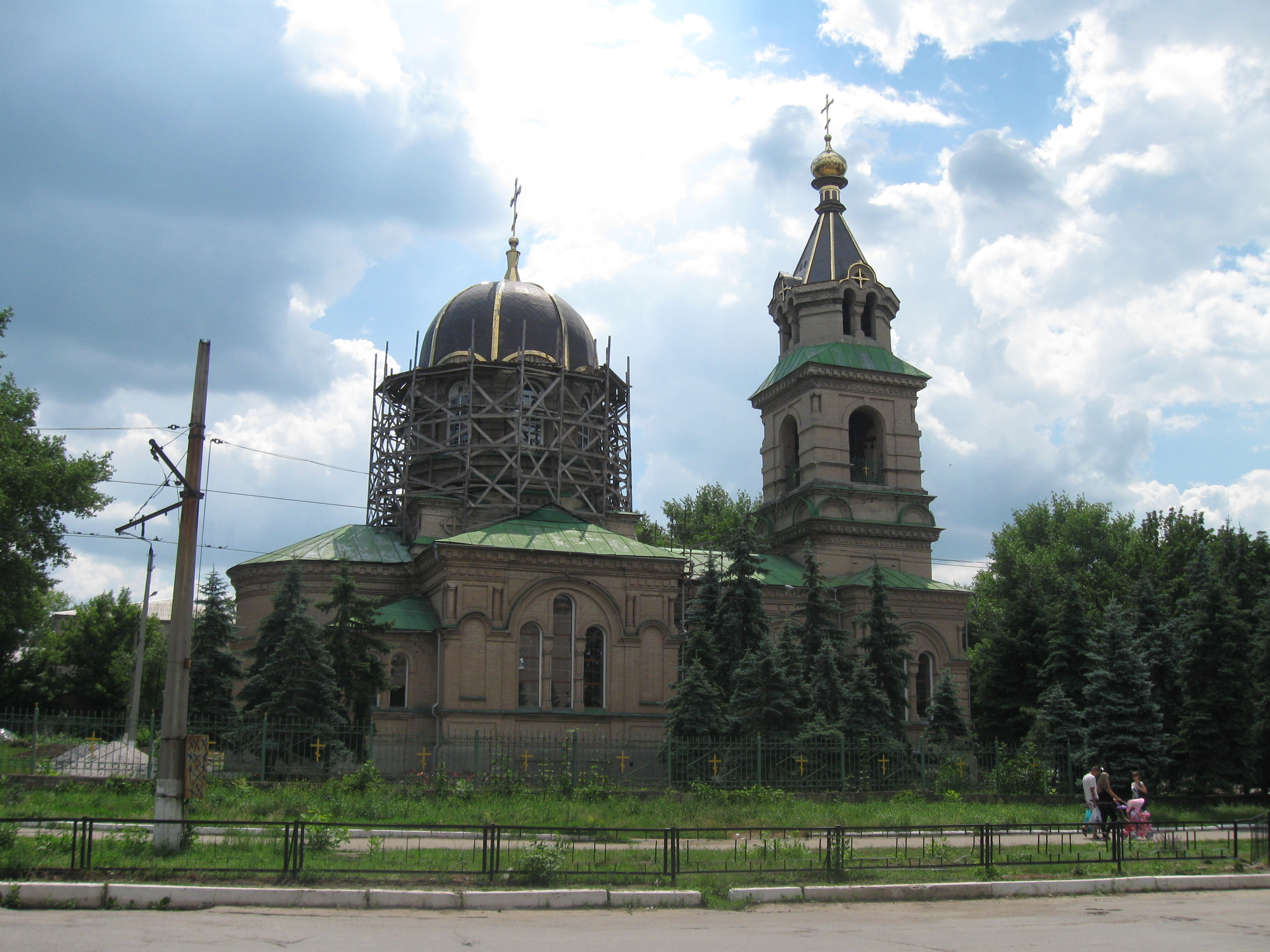
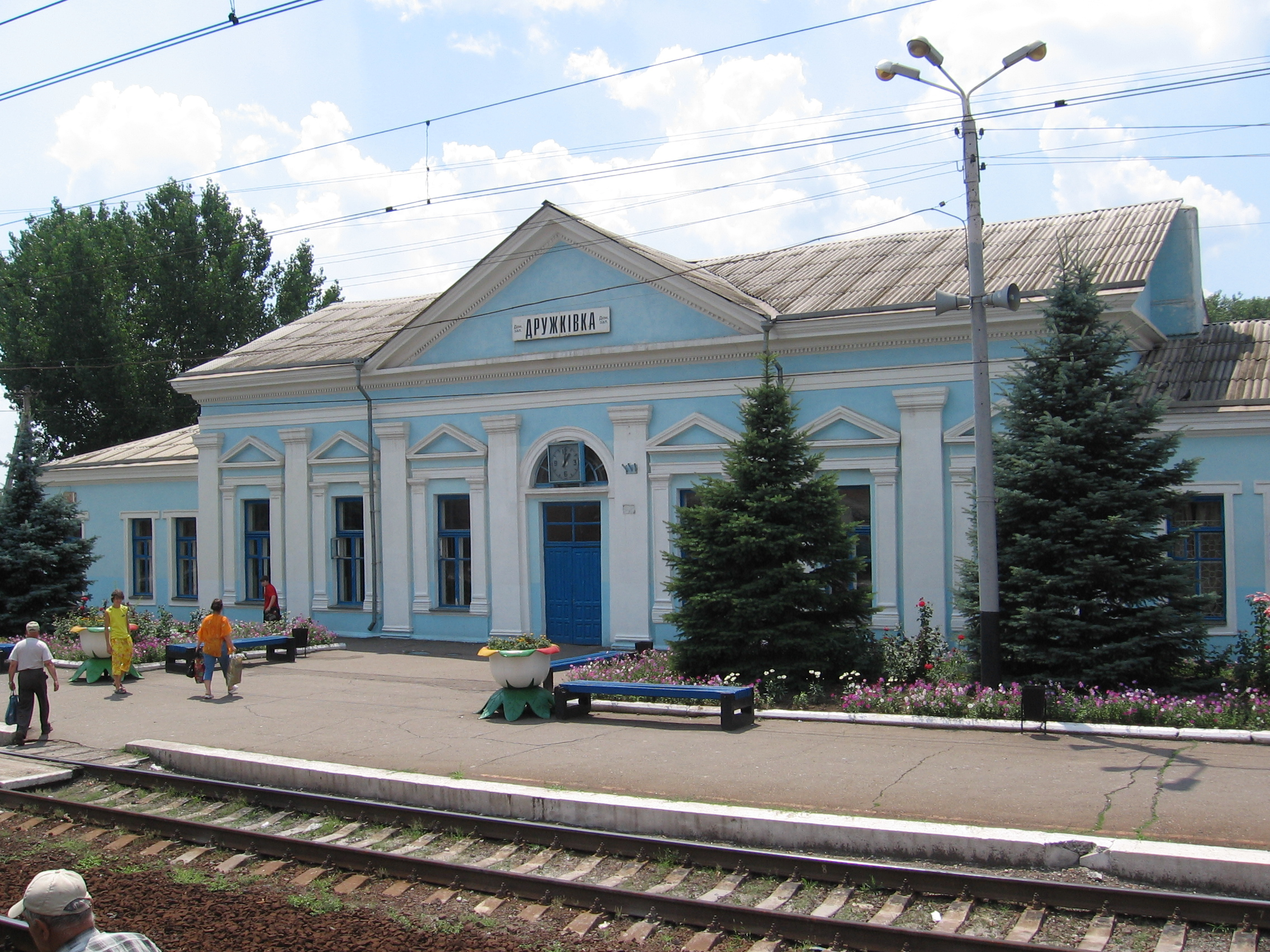
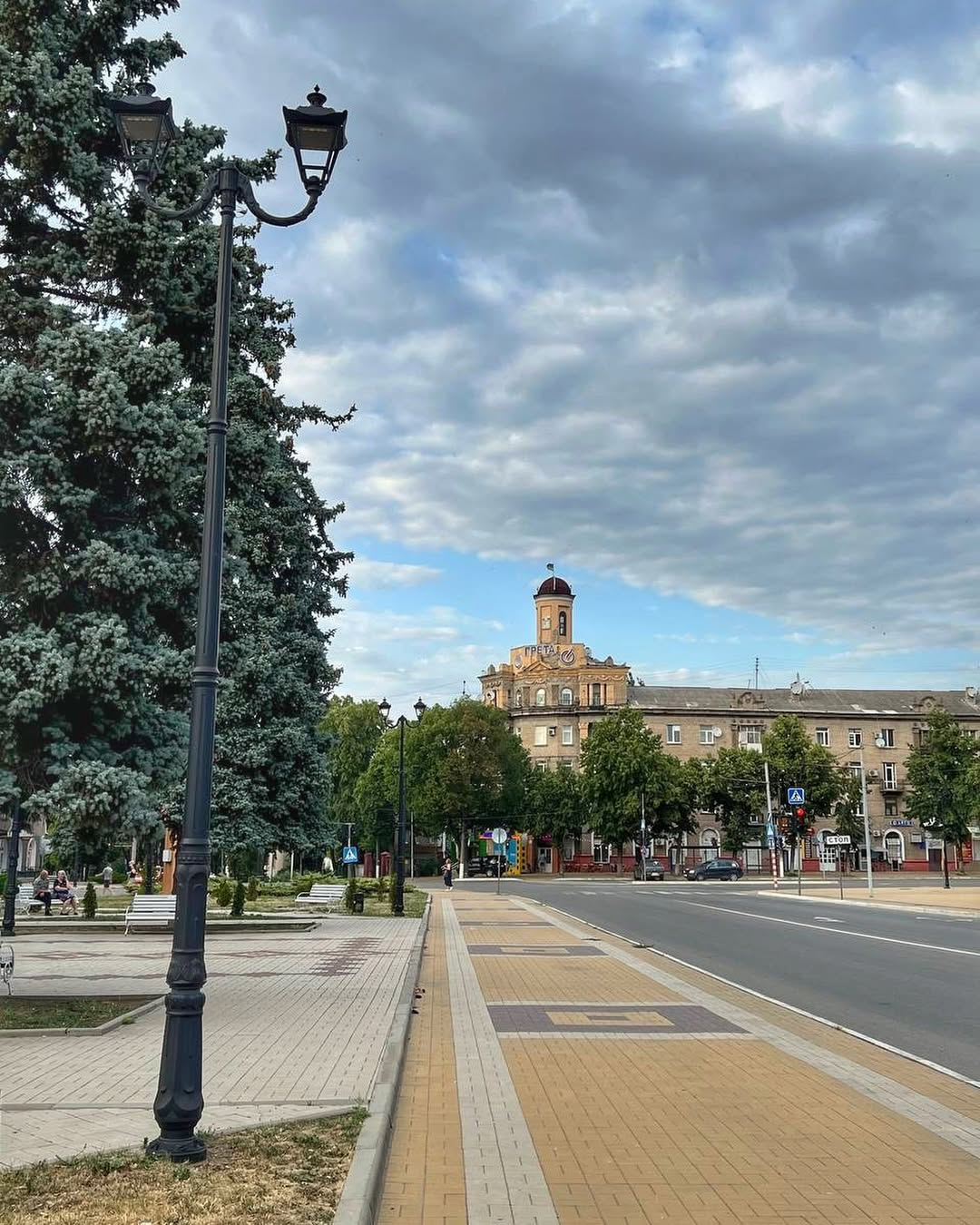
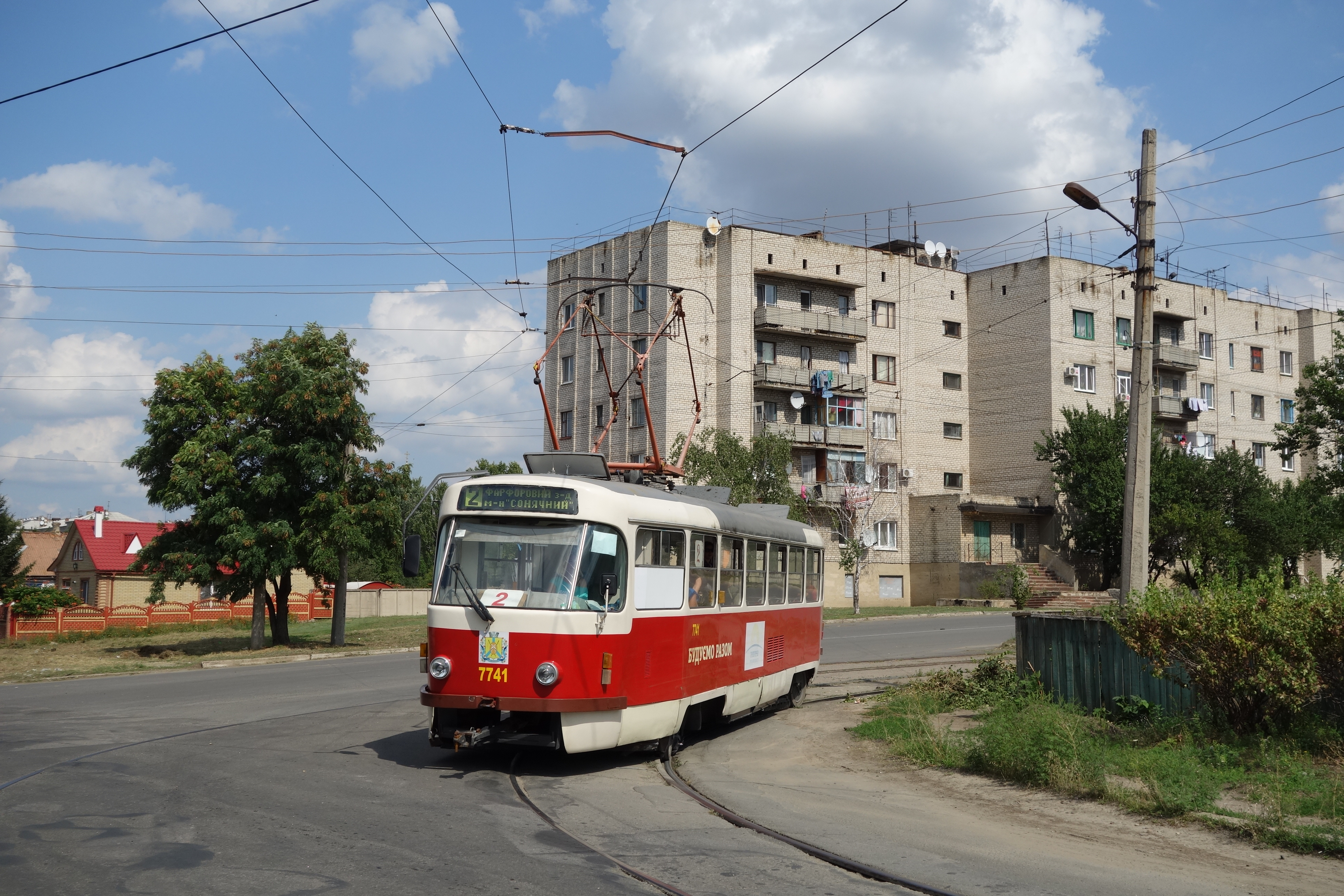
- St. Nicholas Church Railway station Main square Tatra T3 tram

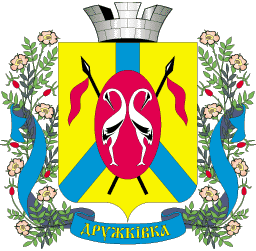
- Flag Seal
- Interactive map of Druzhkivka
- Location within Donetsk Oblast Location within Ukraine
- Coordinates: 48°37′17″N 37°31′40″E
- Country: Ukraine
- Oblast: Donetsk Oblast
- Raion: Kramatorsk Raion
- Hromada: Druzhkivka urban hromada
- First mentioned: 1781
- City rights: 1938

Government

Area
  - Total: 36.03 km^{2} (13.91 sq mi)
- Elevation: 77 m (253 ft)

Population (2022)
  - Total: 53,977
  - Density: 1,498/km^{2} (3,880/sq mi)
- Postal code: 84200—84290
- Area code: +380-6267
- Website: https://dru.city/

Druzhkivka (Ukrainian: Дружківка, pronounced [drʊʒˈkiu̯kɐ]; Russian: Дружковка, romanized: Druzhkovka) is a city in Donetsk Oblast, Ukraine. It was previously a city of regional significance before the status was abolished. It serves as the administrative center of Druzhkivka urban hromada and is part of Kramatorsk Raion. Population of the city was 53,977 (2022 estimate). As of July 2026, the city's population was over 4,000.

In 2014, Druzhkivka was temporarily captured during the War in Donbas by pro-Russian separatists.

== Geography ==
The city is located at the confluence of the Kryvyi Torets and Kazennyi Torets rivers (the Seversky Donets basin), the distance to the city Donetsk is 80 km. There is a railway station. The distance to Druzhkivka from Donetsk is about 66 km (75 km by road, 72 km by rail). The distance to Kyiv is about 543 km (739 km by road, 656 km by rail).

== History ==
=== Early history ===
The first mention of Druzhkivka dates back to 1781 ("Information on the lands of the Yekaterinoslav Governorate"). Historical records indicate that a settlement named Druzhkivka was established in this area by 1781. From the late 19th through the 20th century, Druzhkivka grew into a mid-size industrial city with several large factories producing mining equipment and machinery, hardware, kitchen stoves, china tableware and bricks, as well as several clay-extracting quarries in the city's vicinity.

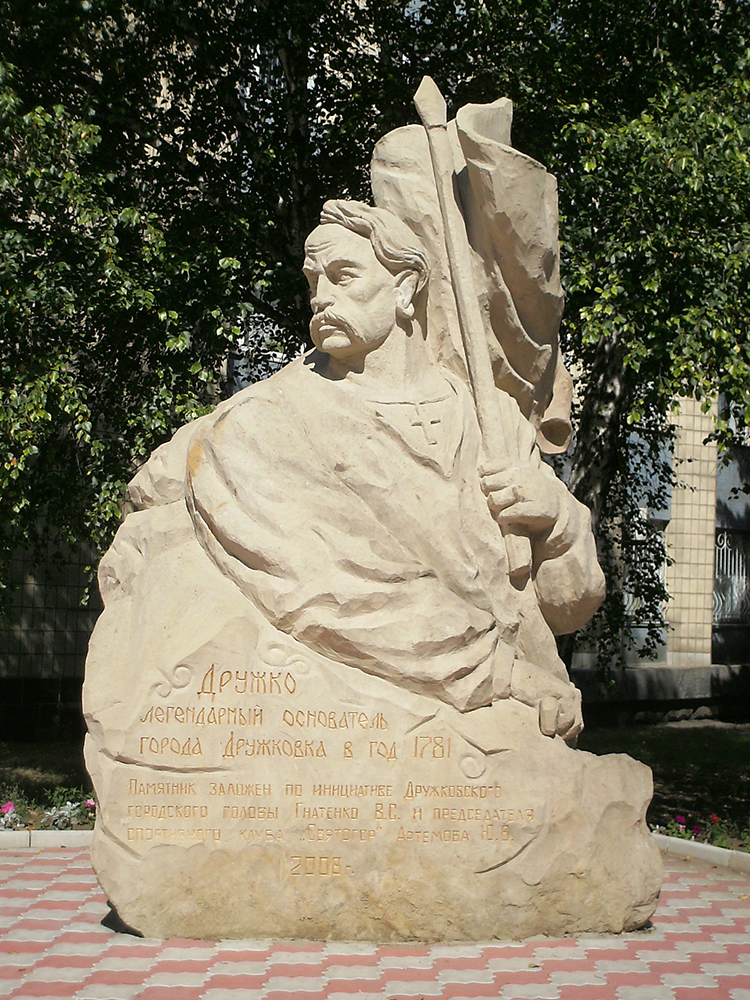
Cossack Druzhko monument

In 1870, during the construction of the Kursk–Kharkiv–Azov Railway, Druzhkivka station was built 6 km north of the Parshakovka settlement, giving rise to a workers' settlement (which later included the settlement).

=== 20th century ===
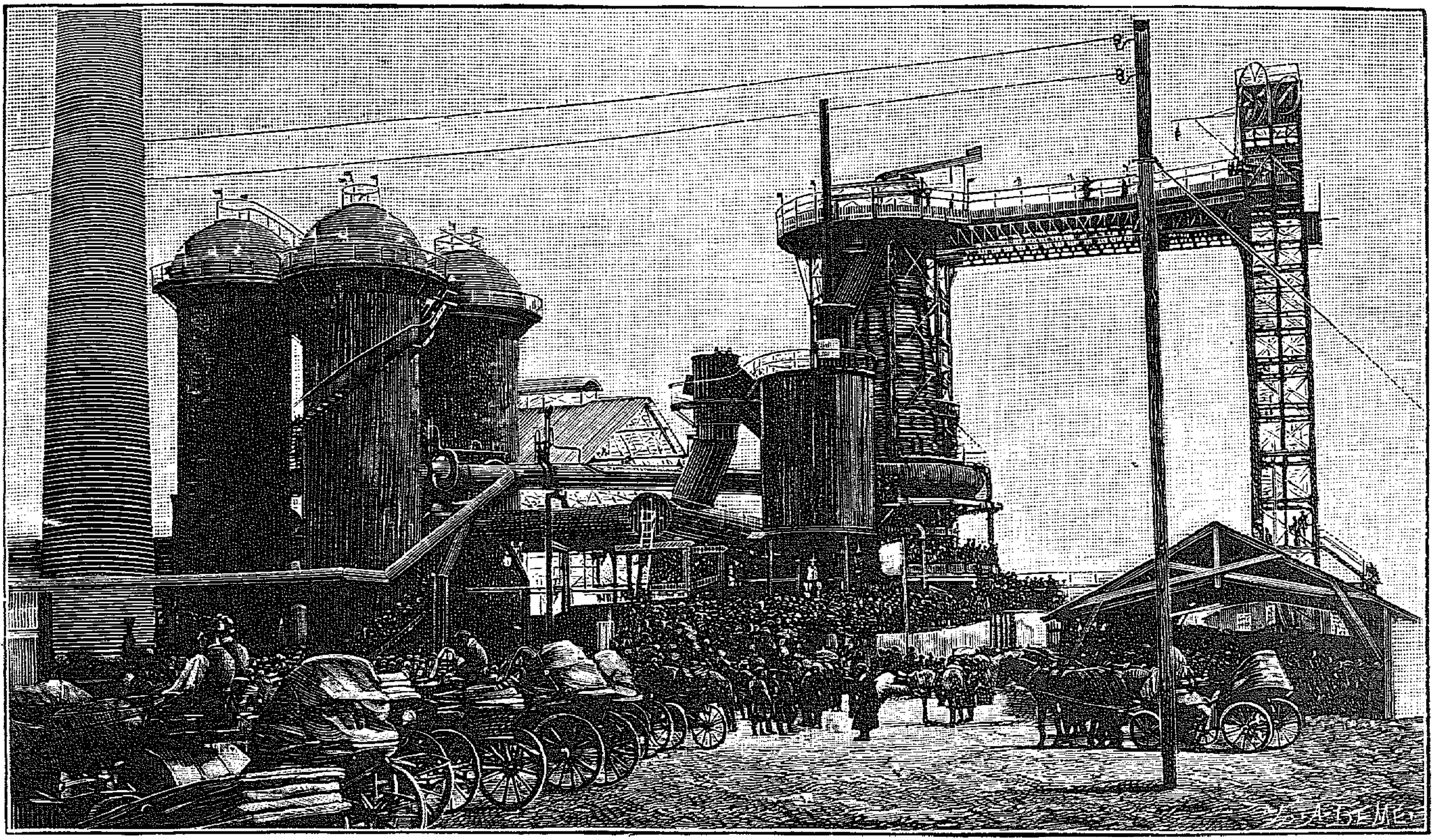
Opening of the Druzhkivka Metallurgical Plant in 1894

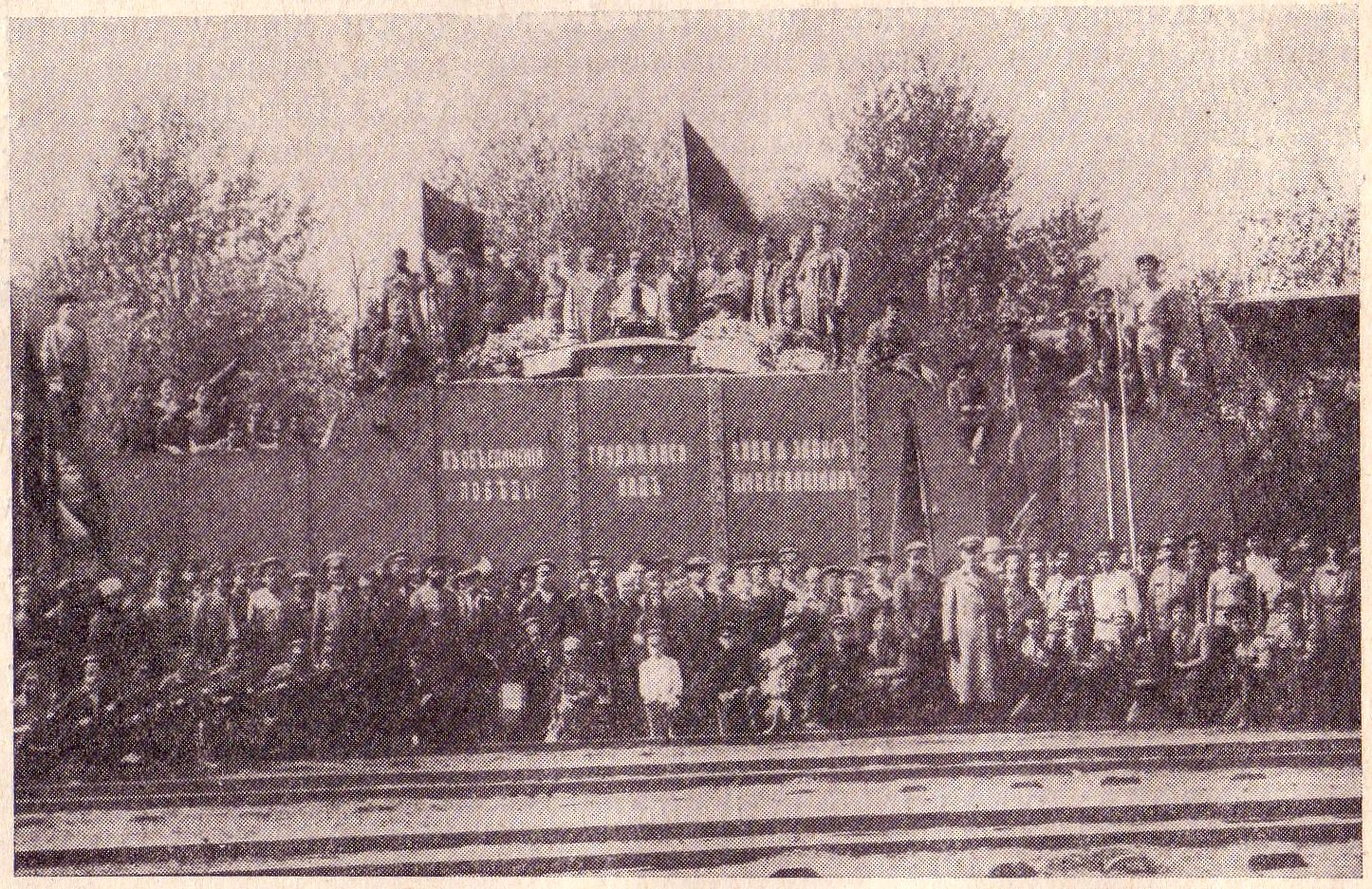
Railway station in 1919

By the beginning of the 20th century, the village of Druzhkivka in the Bakhmut uezd of the Yekaterinoslav Governorate had several factories: an iron foundry and a steel foundry (the main product was rails, built by the French), a steel foundry and a mechanical plant (equipment for railways: carriages, springs, built by the Belgians), as well as a sugar factory (built in 1873). At that time, the village had a population of about 6,000 people. In 1893, the Donetsk Society of Railway and Steel Production, founded by the French, began building the Toretsk Metallurgical Plant. In 1896, Kuprin toured the Donetsk Basin with a correspondent's certificate. In May, he spent several days in the village. Druzhkivka, Yekaterinoslav province, getting acquainted with the local rail rolling plant and studying the working conditions of the workers there.

By 1913, Druzhkivka's population had reached 13,500. At the beginning of the 20th century, many peasants from the Oryol and Kursk provinces resettled here. Residents were served by two hospitals and four elementary schools. The village of Yakovlevsky had two churches and a Catholic church. After the February Revolution of 1917, the village was granted city status. The number of city council members was set at 32.

During the first five-year plans, the largest hardware plant in the USSR (1929), a power plant, and new workshops at the metallurgical plant were built. On 27 October 1938, the settlement of Druzhkivka received city status. By 1939, 32,000 people lived there, and the housing stock had tripled compared to 1913. There was a hospital and four first-aid stations, eight comprehensive schools, a workers' faculty, an evening department of a mechanical engineering technical school, a cinema, two clubs, and a stadium.

=== World War II ===
During World War II, Druzhkivka was occupied by the German army from 22 October 1941, to 6 February 1943, and again from 9 February to 6 September 1943. During their occupation, the SS killed many local Jews. A witness from the village described the SS hanging Jews along the railway.

The killing of the Jewish population was carried out by operational teams of the Ordnungspolizei (OrPo) and the Sicherheitsdienst (SD), which followed the forward units of the Wehrmacht. In the Druzhkivka area, Sonderkommando 4b and Einsatzgruppe 6 operated. The German occupation authorities issued orders for the Jews to undertake forced labour and made it compulsory for them to wear identifying armbands featuring the Star of David. The earliest documented killings of Jews in Druzhkivka date back to December 1941. Local auxiliary police compiled the lists of people and then helped to arrange shootings.

By February 1942, a total of 148 Jews remained in Druzhkivka, mostly women, children and the elderly. Nearly all of them were shot dead by Germans within the period February 1942 to May 1943. The number and names of those killed, the sites and dates of the shootings, the perpetrators of the crimes and the stories of hiding and rescue have not been fully established to this day. Long after the Soviet liberation of Druzhkivka on 6 September 1943, the repercussions of Nazi terror and violence haunted the surviving victims. It was liberated by units of the 279th Rifle Division under the command of Colonel F.V. Chervyakov.

=== After World War II ===
After the Great Patriotic War, a building materials plant (1954), a gas equipment plant (1958), a porcelain factory (1971), and a mine administration (1958) were built, and a road bridge was constructed across the Kryvyi Torets River. In 1981, a memorial sign commemorating the city's 200th anniversary was erected on Lenin Street near the City Executive Committee.

During the 2014 pro-Russian conflict in Ukraine the town was captured in mid-April 2014 by pro-Russian separatists. The city was eventually recaptured by Ukrainian forces on 7 July 2014, along with Bakhmut.

On 4 February 2026 at least seven civilians were killed in a Russian artillery strike on Druzhkivka, in which Ukrainian officials said that Russia used cluster munitions.

== Economy ==
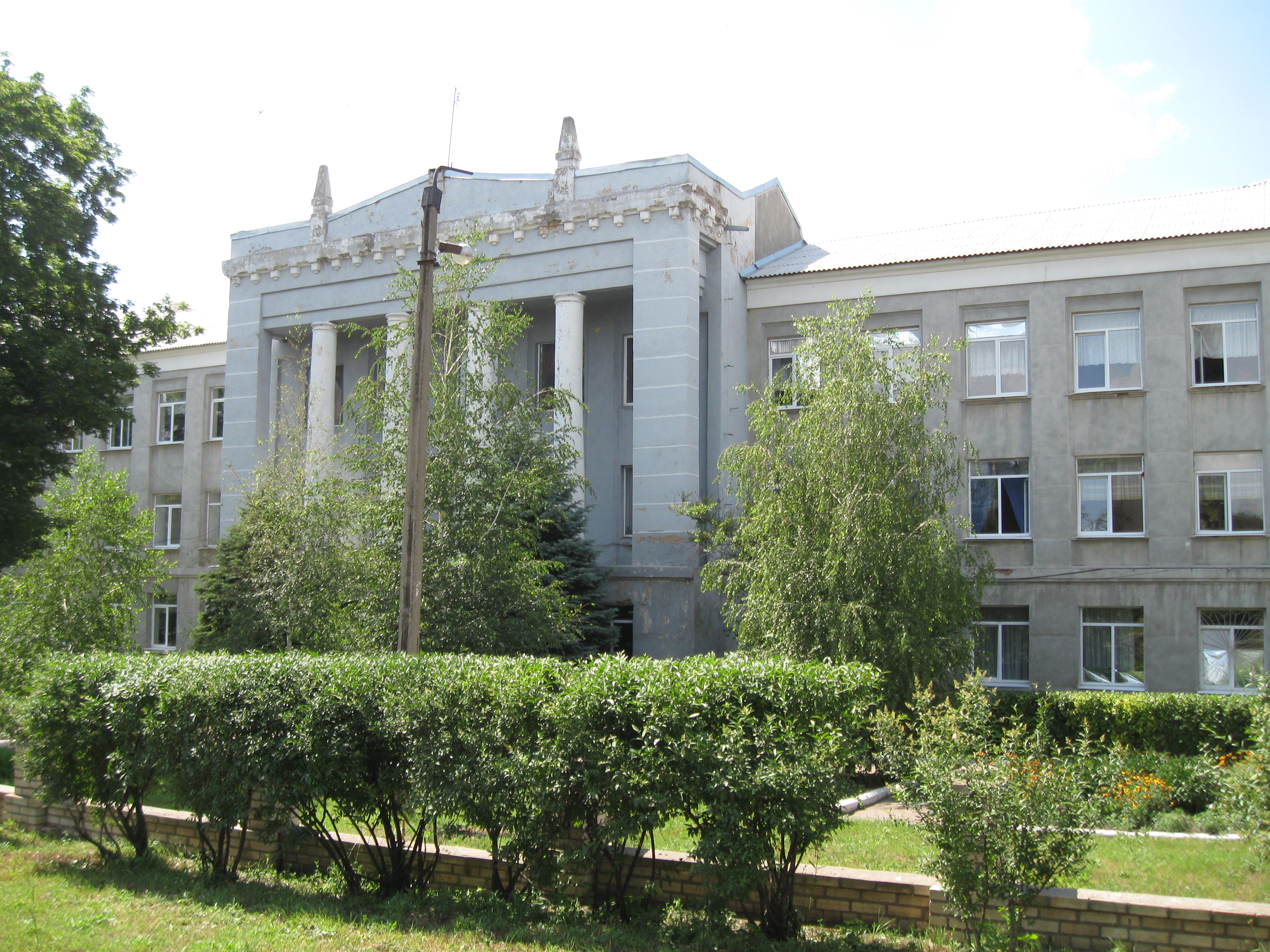
Druzhkivka Mechanical Engineering College

Over 60% of the population works in industry. The city's main enterprises are:

- Druzhkivka Machine-Building Plant
- Druzhkivka Hardware Plant (metal products) is the largest enterprise in the entire CIS producing mechanical engineering and railway fasteners. The company has mastered the production of new high-strength bolts for building structures (including bridges), as well as metal structures used in heavy engineering.
- Druzhkivka Gas Equipment Plant (PJSC Greta) produces various models of gas stoves and household electric stoves.
- Druzhkivka Porcelain Factory
- Druzhkivka Mine Administration
- Druzhkivka Computer Equipment Repair Plant
- Druzhkivka Food Flavoring Factory
- Druzhkivka Bakery

In 2010, industrial sales totaled 2 billion 640 million Ukrainian hryvnias (UAH). The machine-building plant accounted for the largest share (approximately 54%) of total sales. The hardware plant accounted for almost 14%, Vesko 14%, Greta 11%, and the mine administration and Kondratyevsky Refractory Plant each accounted for 6%.

=== Finance ===
In 2008, the city budget was UAH 48 million, including: UAH 32 million for education, UAH 26.4 million for healthcare, UAH 35.7 million for social protection, UAH 3.07 million for culture, UAH 2.37 million for housing and utilities, and UAH 8.56 million for administration. The main source of budget revenue is personal income tax, which accounts for over 80% of the budget.

In 2020, the budget was UAH 402.7 million, the main source being tax revenues, which account for 58.7% of the budget (76.48% of which is personal income tax).

== Transportation ==
=== Tram ===
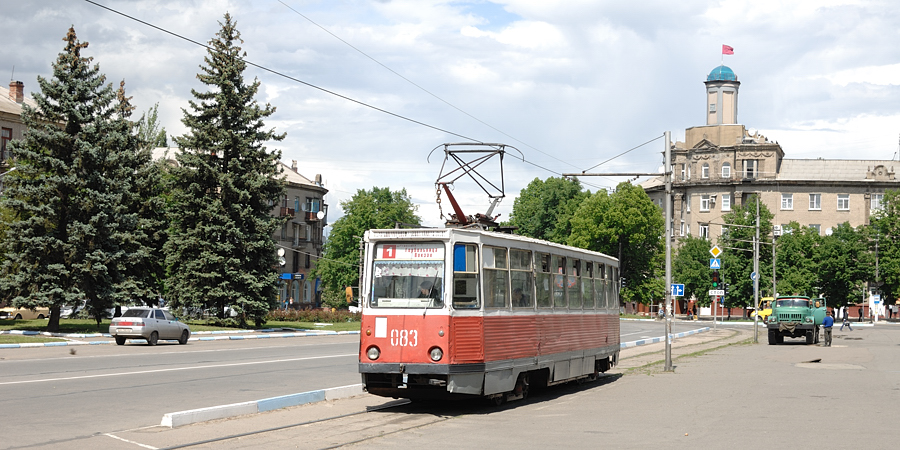
Tatra T3 of the Druzhkivka tramway system

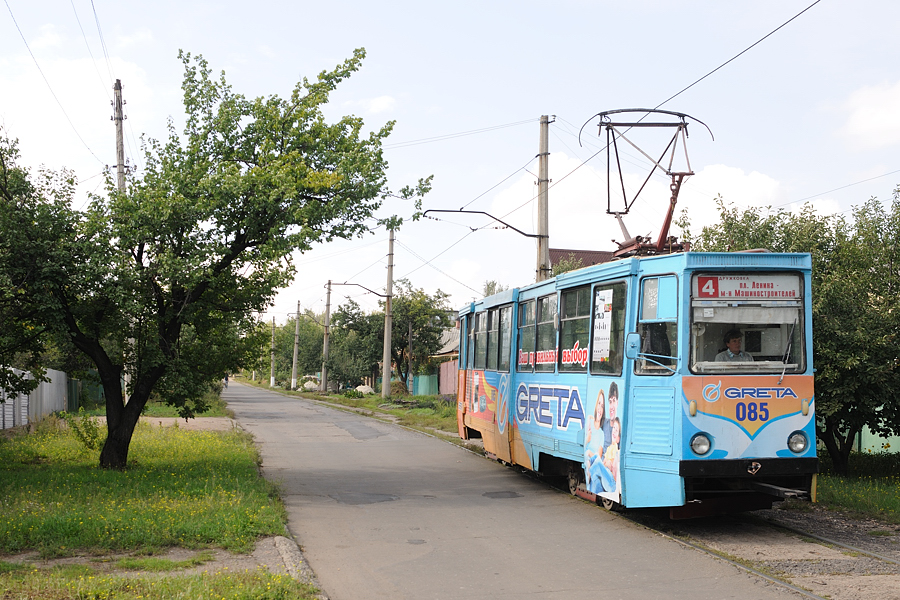
KTM-5M3 tram

In Druzhkivka, tram services are operated by KP Druzhkivka AutoElektroTrans, which is partially funded by the Druzhkivka City Council, the city's tram fleet has been actively modernized. Over the course of three years, nine Tatra T3SU and Tatra T3SUCS cars, imported from the Czech Republic and Kharkiv, were transferred to the municipal enterprise. All cars underwent a major overhaul in Kharkiv before arriving in the city. As of 1 January 2019, 4–8 trams are in service daily. There are 3 regular routes (1, 2, and 4), as well as a night route operating on all city routes. On 1 November 2025, due to regular shelling, electricity shortages, the security situation, and the evacuation of the population, the city authorities decided to permanently suspend tram traffic.

=== Buses ===
==== City and Suburban ====
There are 21 city buses running in Druzhkovka, 14 suburban buses, and 3 intercity buses (not including routes passing through the city along the highway, but still entering it) (non-inbound) bus routes. The fare on public city bus routes is 6 hryvnias per trip as of 9 June 2021.

==== Intercity ====
There are routes to Druzhkivka from Kramatorsk, Kostiantynivka, Sloviansk, and Dobropillia. The Druzhkivka carrier operates only the route to Kostiantynivka.

==== Bus Station ====
The Druzhkivka bus station was renovated in 2007. It is of absolutely no significance. There are no routes from the city to the bus station, and long-distance buses stop near "MAN". National highway H-20 passes through Druzhkivka, where the bus station is located.

=== Railroad ===
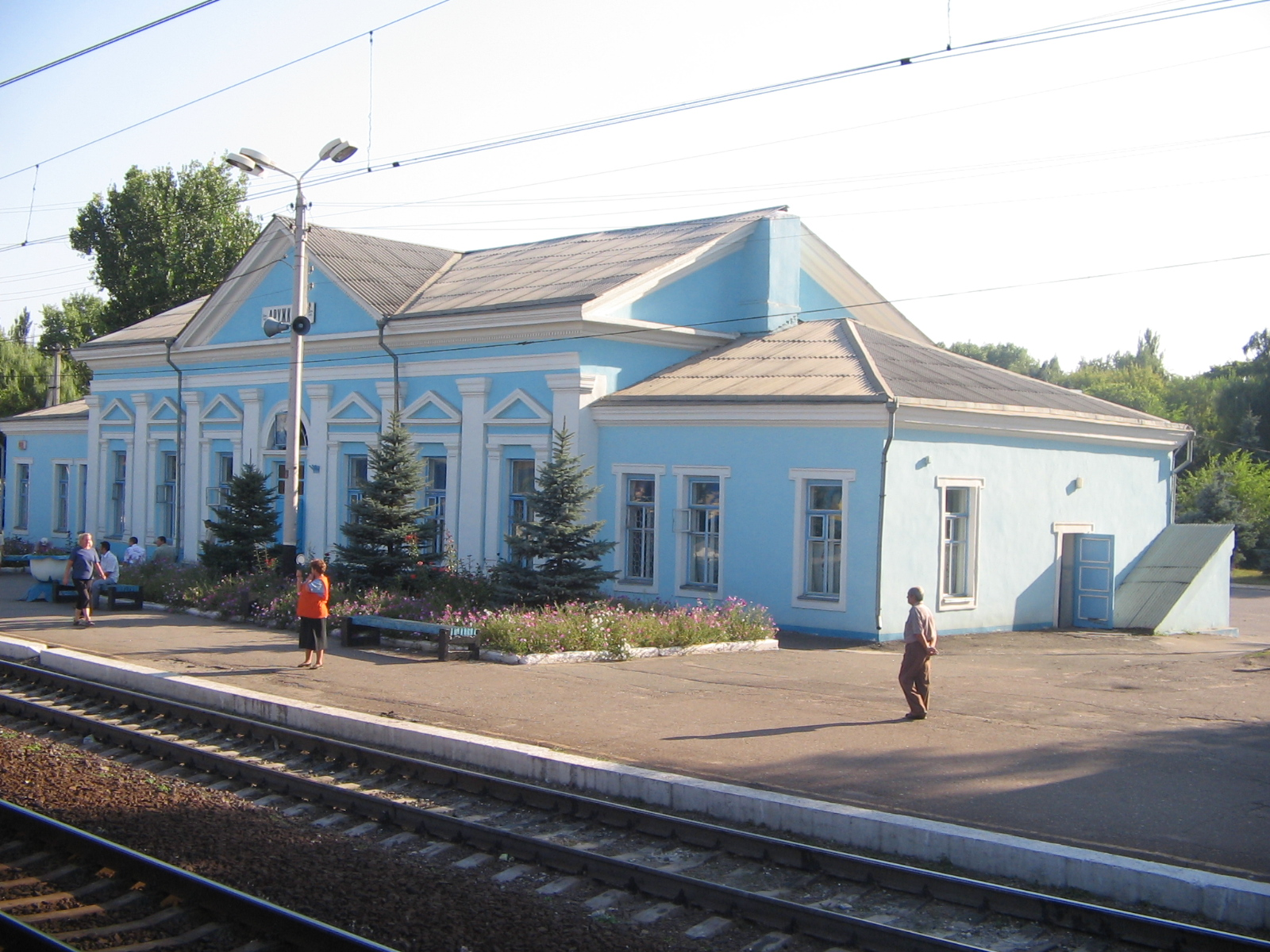
Druzhkivka railway station

There are two train stations in Druzhkivka: Druzhkivka and 1057 km. The Druzhkivka railway station was built in 1870. Its train destinations are Sloviansk, Lozova, Kharkiv, Poltava, Sumy, Konotop, Kyiv, Korosten, Koziatyn, Zhmerynka, and Khmelnytskyi.

== Social sphere ==
=== Education ===
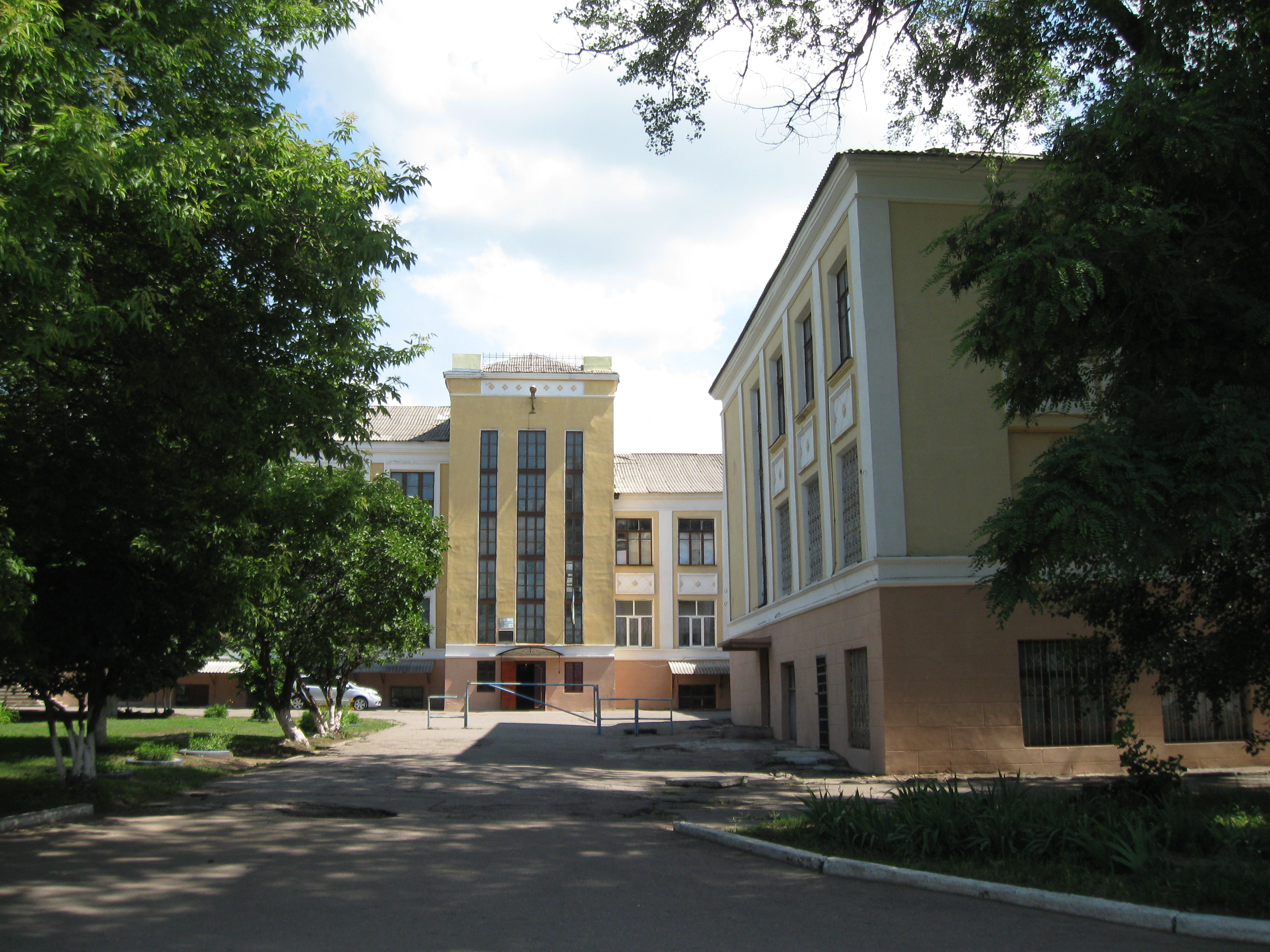
School No. 6

- 14 schools: 12 comprehensive schools (School No. 1, School No. 3, School No. 4, School No. 6, School No. 7, School No. 8, School No. 9, School No. 10, School No. 11, School No. 12, School No. 14, and School No. 17), the Intellect Gymnasium, and Druzhkovka Vocational Lyceum No. 36 (since 1940, Soborna St., 8)
- Druzhkovka Technical School of the Dagestan State Medical Academy, Soborna, 32. Currently a structural division of the Donbas State Machine-Building Academy.
- Housing and Communal Services College of the Donbas National Academy of Civil Engineering and Architecture, st. Lomonosova, 1
- Children's and Youth Creativity Center
- Young Technicians' Station of the Hardware Plant

=== Media ===
Newspapers: "Druzhkovsky Rabochy", "Druzhkovka on the Palms+", "Druzhkovsky Mashinostroitel", "Nasha Druzhkovka", "Druzhkovka City".

From 1994 to 2004, the city's first independent newspaper, OKNO, was published. In 1997, the newspaper was recognized as the best regional publication in Ukraine at the All-Ukrainian Journalism Festival in Kyiv.

=== Culture ===
- City Palace of Culture "Etiud", 6 Lenin Street
- Libraries
  - Lesya Ukrainka Central City Library, 112 Engels Street
  - Central Children's Library, 13 Soborna Street
  - Chekhov Branch Library No. 1, 33 Soborna Street
  - Children's Branch Library No. 2, 51 Kosmonavtiv Street
  - Branch Library No. 3, Surove Village, Rozova, 72
  - Branch Library No. 4, Oleksiivo-Druzhkivka settlement, Ilyicha Street, 85
  - Branch Library No. 5, Novo-Hryhoriivka settlement, Rozdilna Street, 9
  - Branch Library No. 6, Raiske settlement, Doroshenko Street, 6
  - Branch Library No. 7, Iziumska Street, 91
- Kosmos Cinema (currently closed), Soborna Street, 23
- Art School, Rybyna, 1

=== Sports ===
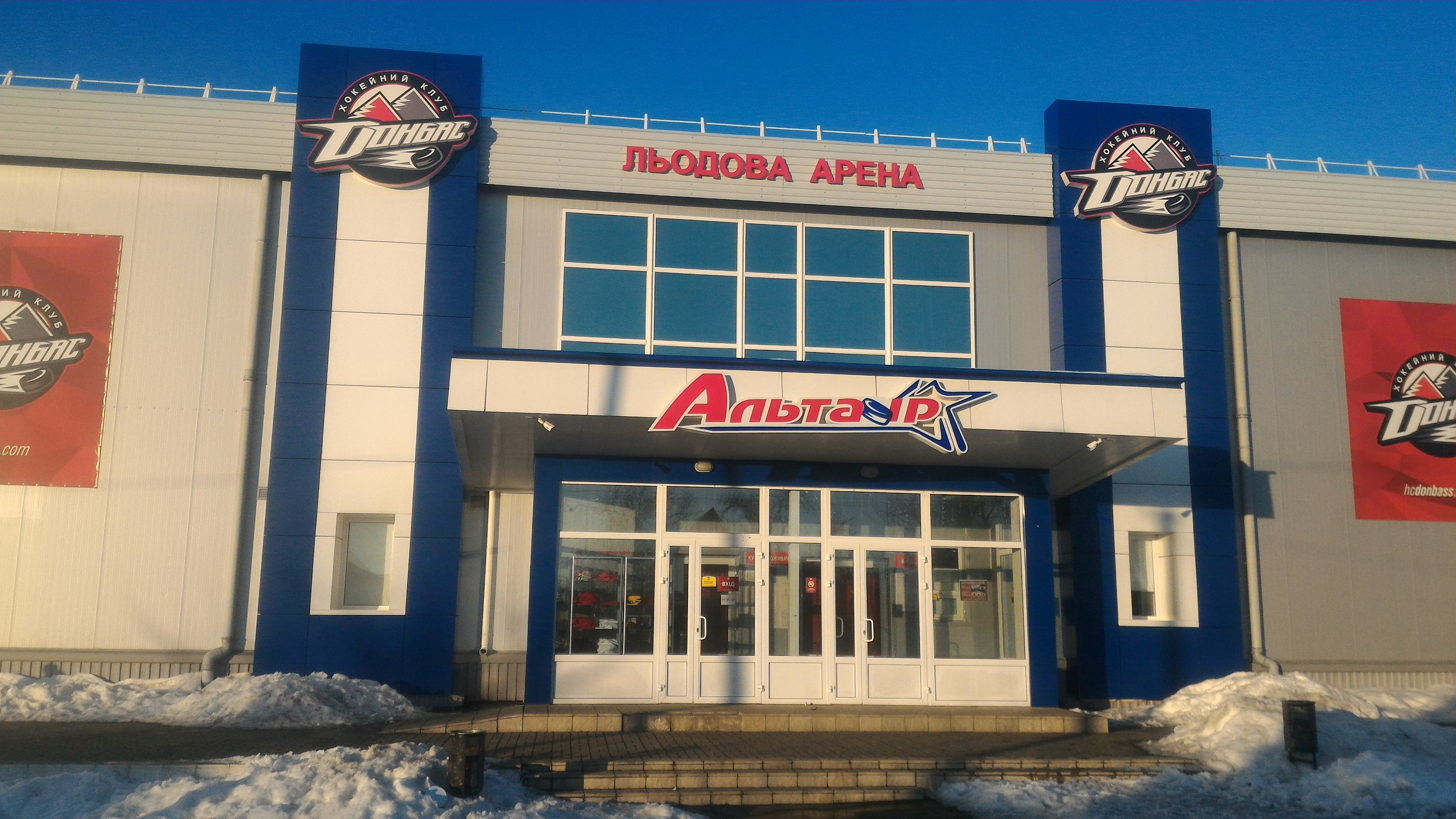
Altair Ice Arena

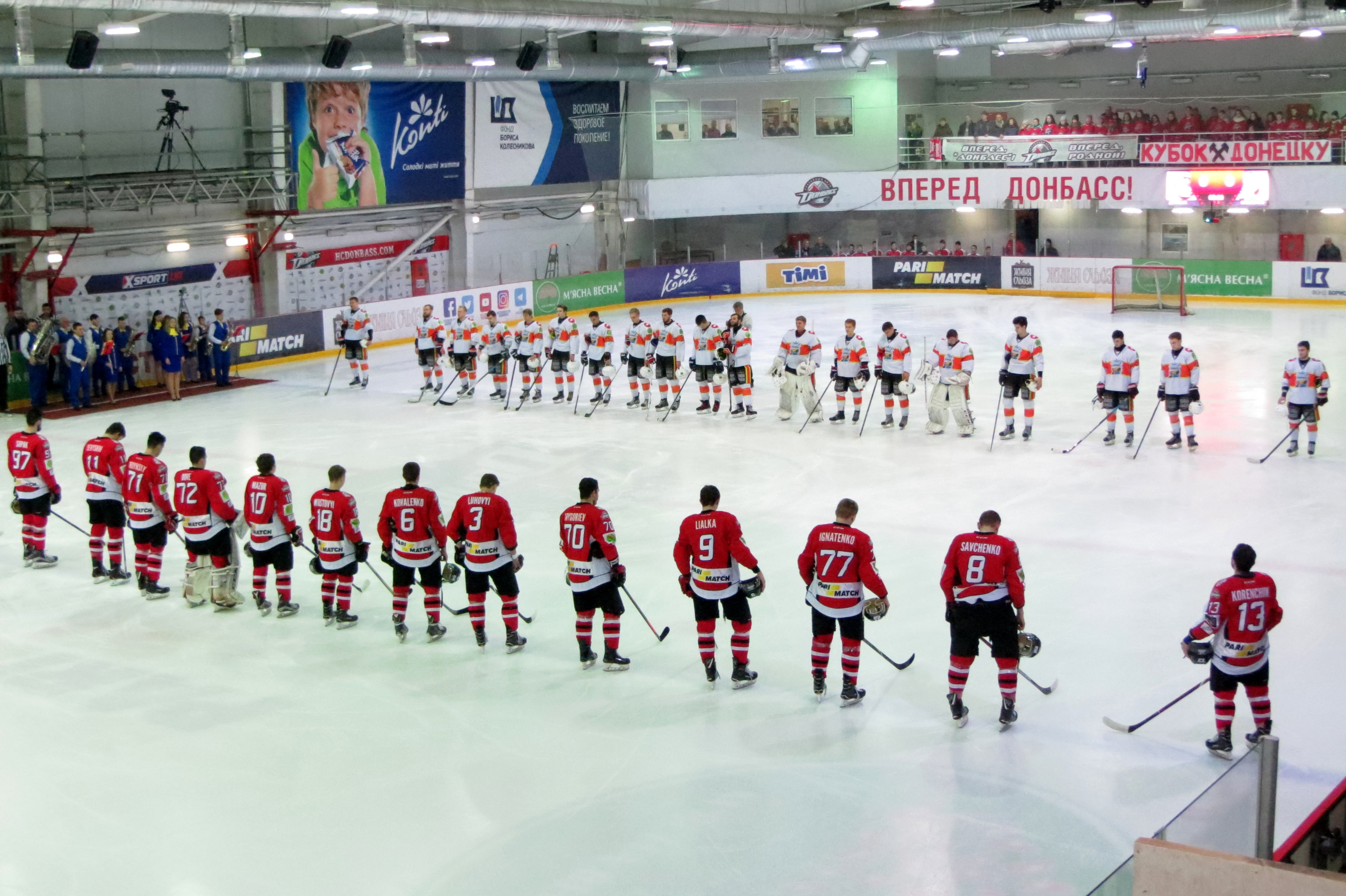
Ice hockey team HC Donbass before match

- Children's and Youth Creativity Center
- Sports Palace
- Mashynobudivnyk Stadium
- Indoor Ice Arena "Altair", main stadium of the HC Donbass
- Swimming pool in the Children's and Youth Creativity Center
- From 1999 to 2002, the football club Mashynobudivnyk Druzhkoika competed in the Ukrainian Second League

=== Healthcare ===
- 3 city hospitals
- Dental clinic
- Ambulance station
- Outpatient clinics in Alekseyevo-Druzhkovka and Raiskoye
- Drug addiction clinic
- Orphanage

== City districts ==
=== High-rise buildings ===
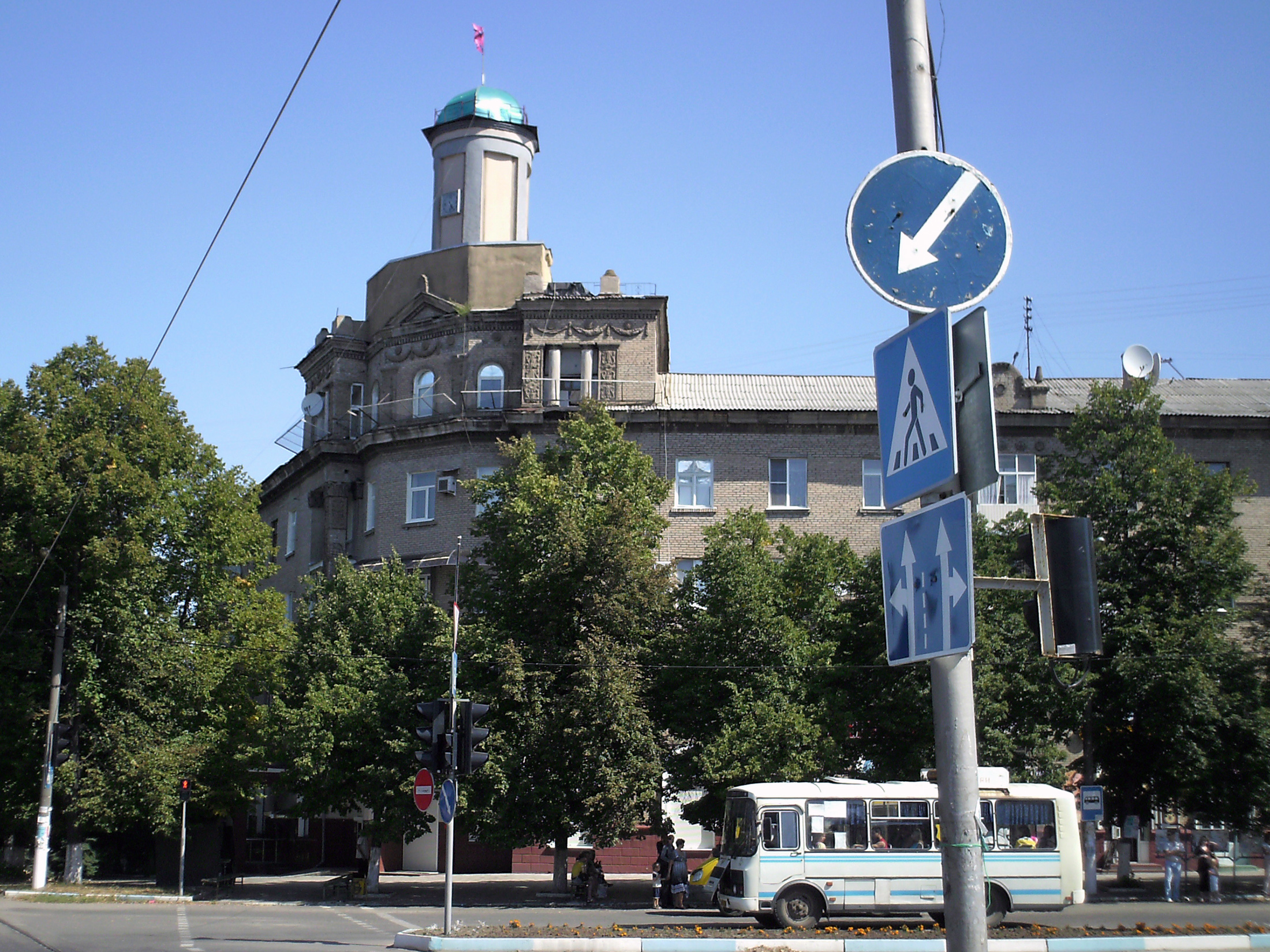
Residential building on 11 Soborna Street

- Microdistrict No. 13 (City Center)
- Sobachovka (VZhSK)
- "Blocks"
- Soniachnyi microdistrict (9-microdistrict) — located in the southeastern part of the city, bordering the field in the north, the Industrialnyi and Pionerskyi microdistricts in the west, and the Southern microdistrict and the village of Dvistiplany in the south. The final stop of tram No. 2 is located here.
- Industrialnyi microdistrict (8-microdistrict) — located in the southeastern part of the city, in the north it borders with Druzhkivka Machine-Building Plant, in the west with the village of Havrylivka, in the east with the Soniachnyi microdistrict, in the south with the Pionersky and Pivdenny microdistricts.
- Pivdennyi microdistrict (7-microdistrict) — the southernmost microdistrict of the city, in the north it borders with the Industrialny microdistrict, in the west — with the Pionerskyi microdistrict, in the east — with the Soniachnyi microdistrict, in the south — with the steppe.
- Pionerskyi microdistrict (10-microdistrict) — located in the southern part of the city; in the north and west it borders the village of Havrylivka, in the east — with Industrialnyi and Soniachnyi, in the south with the microdistrict Pivdennyi. A tram depot is located here.

=== Private development ===
- Railway station area
- Havrylivka
  - Pivnichna Havrylivka
    - Pivnichna Havrylivka (Eastern)
    - Pivnichna Havrylivka (Western)
  - Pivdenna Gavrilivka
- Yakovlivka
- Dvistiplany (Mashinostudivnyky)
- Donsky
- Kirpychny
- NZhSK
- Molokovo
- Nakhalovka
- Karlivka
- Suvore
- Toretsky

=== Main streets ===
Bohdan Khmelnytsky Street, Oleksa Tykhy Street, Soborna Street, Skhidna Street, Mashynosbudivnykiv Street, Oleh Koshevsky Street, Svobody Street, Kozatska Street, Mykola Mikhnovsky Street, Druzhby Street, Pedagogical Street, Lisova Street, Deputatska Street, Kosmonavtiv Street, Novosadova Street, Dzherelna Street, Engels Street, Soniachna Street, Kurchatova Street.

== Demographics ==
According to the 2001 census, the city's population was 64,641, of whom 28.36% identified Ukrainian as their native language, 70.27%— Russian, 0.46%— Armenian and Greek, 0.10%— Belarusian, 0.03% — Romanian, 0.01% — German, Gagauz and Romani, as well as Bulgarian, Polish, Jewish and Greek. Population of Druzhkivka as of 1 June 2017 — 67,772 people.

=== Historical population ===
Year	Inhabitants
1885	941
1897	1179
1908	1,646
1923	3,432
1927	5,747
1939	31,781
1956	39,300
1959	43,124
1964	50,000
1970	53,338
1979	64,310
1987	70,000
1989	73,723
1992	74,200
1994	73,700
1998	69,600
2002	64,557
2003	64,036
2004	63,481
2005	63,226
2006	62,766
2007	62,348
2008	61,893
2009	61,530
2010	61,002
2011	60,581
2012	60,255
2013	59,863
2014	59,596
2015	59,400
2016	58,953
2017	58,397
2018	57,517
2019	56,842
2020	55,984
2021	55,088
2022	53,977

=== Ethnic Composition ===
Ethnic composition of the population according to the 2001 census.

	Population	Percentage, %
Ukrainians	48,302	64.4
Russians	24,122	32.2
Armenians	612	0.8
Belarusians	490	0.7
Tatars	216	0.3

=== Language Composition ===
Native languages of the population according to the 2001 census.

Language	Number of speakers	Percentage
Russian	45,424	70.27%
Ukrainian	18,331	28.36%
Armenian	295	0.46%
Belarusian	63	0.10%
Romanian	18	0.03%
German	9	0.01%
Other/Did not specify	501	0.77%
Total	64,641	100%

== Attractions ==
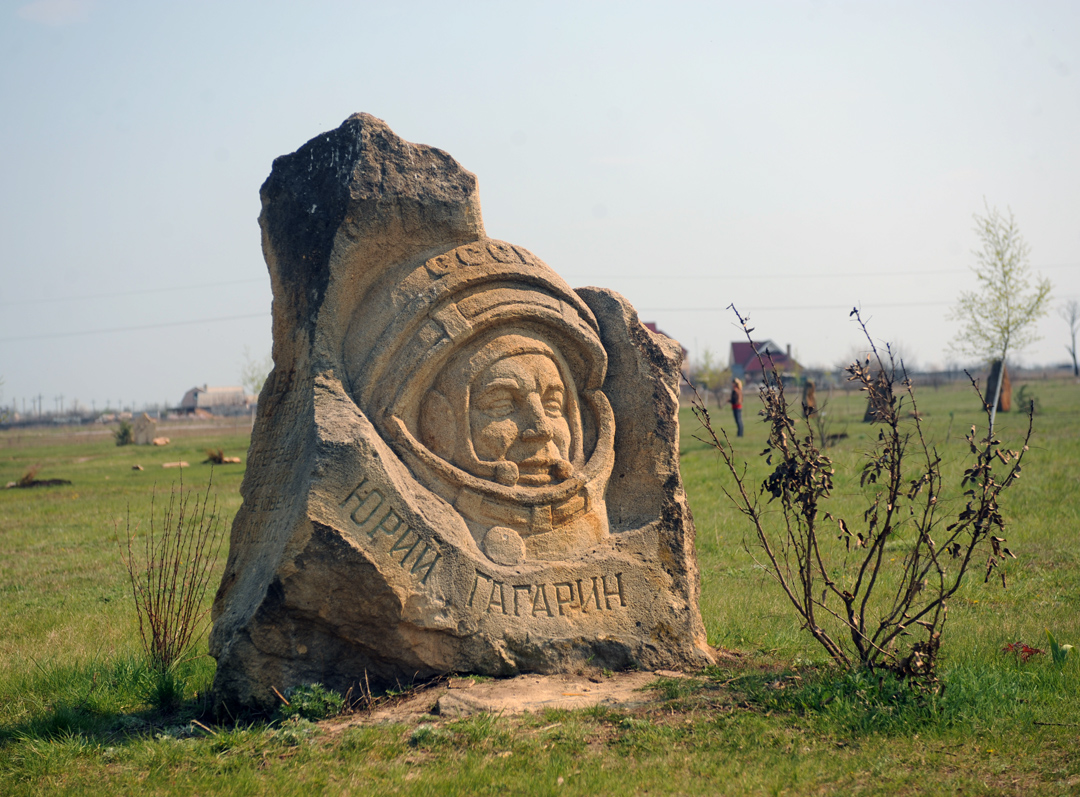
Monument to Yuri Gagarin in Sviatohir Park

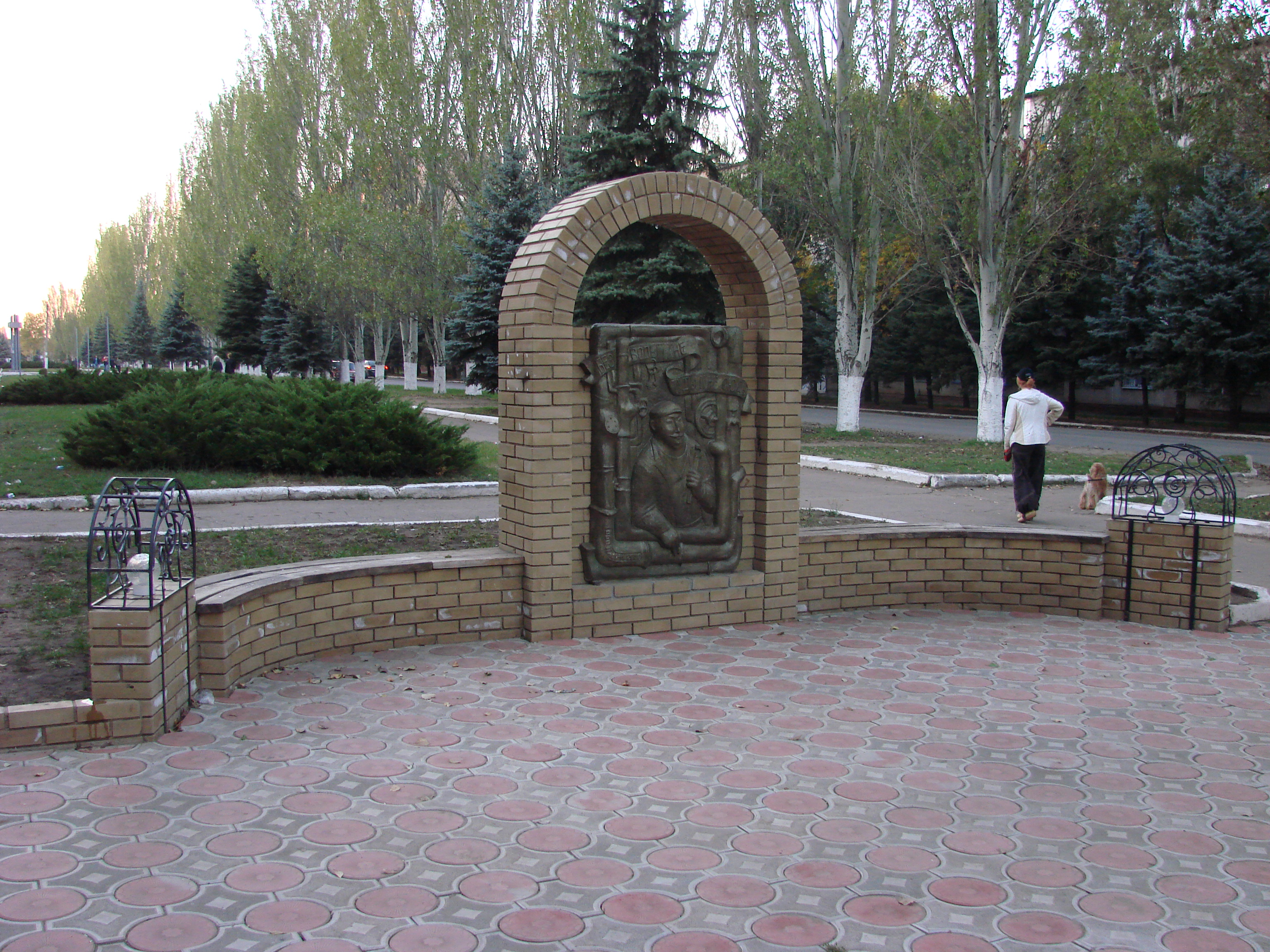
Plumber monument

- Monument to the Cossack Druzhko in the city's main square
- The Svyatogor Stone Sculpture Park, created with the participation of Yuri Artemov
- Druzhkovka Park of Culture and Recreation
- Model of the Tsar Cannon on Kozatska Street
- Mound of Glory
- Druzhkovska Central City Hospital. Located in the 19th-century buildings where the owner of the DMZ and his workers lived
- French Cemetery. The graves and tombstones of the pre-revolutionary founders of the Druzhkovka Machine-Building Plant have been preserved there.
- Petrified Tree Reserve. Located near the village of Oleksiievo-Druzhkivka (0.5 km from the nearest houses). This former quarry, at the bottom of which lie fragments of petrified trees—araucarias over 200 million years old—lie, and the quarry walls are rocky outcrops, that is, sandstone outcrops, sometimes with intricate and beautiful shapes. The quarry is approximately 10–20 meters deep. There are only two such reserves in the world (the other is in the United States).

== Notable people ==
- Weinstein Mykhailo Isakovych, Ukrainian artist.
- Gorbatov Pavlo Anatoliyovych, Ukrainian scientist, Doctor of Technical Sciences (1992), Professor (1993), laureate of the State Prize of Ukraine (1990), Excellent Education of Ukraine (2005).
- Hryhorenko Volodymyr Borysovych, politician, Druzhkivka city mayor (since 2020).
- Kashpor Olga Mykhailovych, Ukrainian journalist.
- Kolesnyk Olena Oleksandrivna, Ukrainian scientist in the field of medicine, oncologist.
- Kost Lutsenko, famous figure of the Ukrainian diaspora in the USA.
- Nosulya Mykola Vasilyovich, participant of the Second World War
- Romanov Boris Mykolaovich, graphic artist-designer, member of the National Union of Artists of Ukraine.
- Saburov Maksym Zakharovich, Soviet party and state figure.
- Skoblikov Oleksandr Pavlovich, Ukrainian sculptor, corresponding member of the Academy of Arts of Ukraine, member of the National Union of Artists of Ukraine. Honored Artist of the Ukrainian SSR, People's Artist of the Ukrainian SSR.
- Sylantyev Kostyantyn Vasilyovich, Ukrainian Soviet singer (bass), Honored Artist of the RSFSR, People's Artist of the Ukrainian SSR.
- Oleksa Tykhy, Ukrainian dissident, patriot and human rights activist, teacher, linguist, founding member of the Ukrainian Helsinki Group.
- Tkachenko Oleksandr Opanasovych, Ukrainian sculptor, artist. He worked and lived in Yalta (Crimea). He was a famous master on the South Coast. He worked with clay, created small architectural forms, most of which were in Yalta.
- Fialko Oleh Borysovich, Ukrainian film director, screenwriter.

== Partner cities ==
- (United States) Ridgefield, USA
- Zhmerynka, Ukraine
