= Illinivka rural hromada =

Illinivka rural hromada Іллінівська сільська громада
- Hromada
- Interactive map of Illinivka rural hromada
- Country: Ukraine
- Oblast: Donetsk Oblast
- Raion: Kramatorsk Raion

Area
  - Total: 523.3 km^{2} (202.0 sq mi)

Population (2020)
  - Total: 8,897
  - Density: 17.00/km^{2} (44.03/sq mi)
- Settlements: 25
- Rural settlements: 5
- Villages: 20

Illinivka rural hromada (Ukrainian: Іллінівська сільська громада) is a hromada of Ukraine, located in Kramatorsk Raion, Donetsk Oblast. Its administrative center is the village of Illinivka.

It has an area of 523.3 square kilometres (202.0 mi^{2}) and a population of 8897, as of 2020.

== Composition ==
The hromada contains 25 settlements: 5 rural settlements (Berestok, Dovha Balka, Kleban-Byk, Rozkishne, Zoria), and 20 villages:

- Berezivka
- Hnativka
- Illinivka
- Kalynove
- Katerynivka
- Nova Poltavka
- Novoolenivka
- Oleksandro-Kalynove
- Oleksandropil
- Pleshchiivka
- Poltavka
- Popiv Yar
- Romanivka
- Rusyn Yar
- Stara Mykolaivka
- Stepanivka
- Tarasivka
- Vodiane Druhe
- Yablunivka
- Zelene Pole

== See also ==
- List of hromadas of Ukraine
