= Kleban-Byk Reservoir =

Reservoir in Donetsk Oblast, Ukraine

Coordinates: 48°26′35″N 37°43′44″E

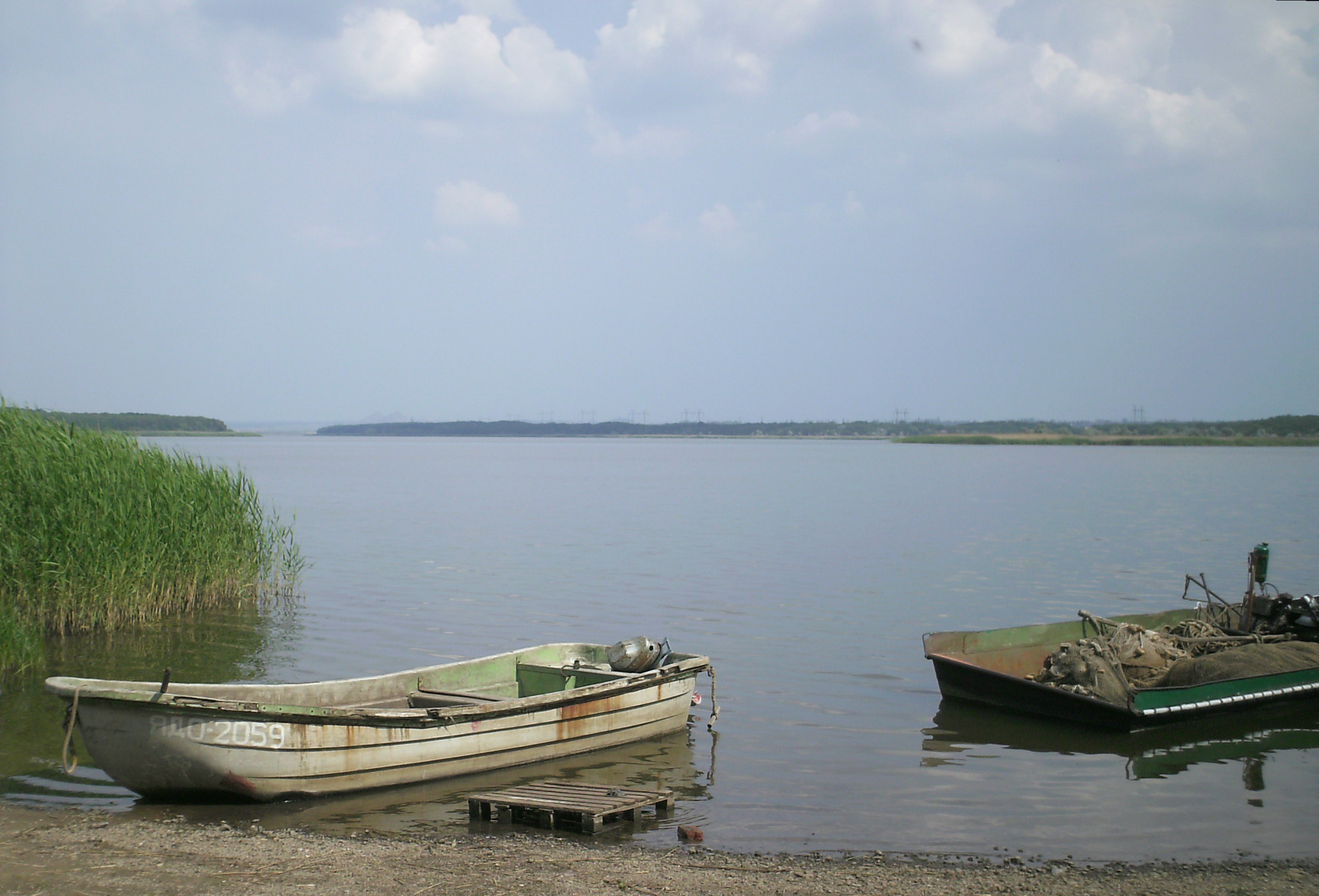
The Kleban-Byk Reservoir in 2008.

The Kleban-Byk Reservoir is an artificial lake in Donetsk Oblast. The reservoir is located to the northwest of Toretsk. It feeds into the Kleban-byk river, a tributary of the Kazennyi Torets river. The nearest settlement is Kleban-Byk.

== History ==
On 4 August 2025, head of the Donetsk People's Republic, Denis Pushilin, claimed that Russian forces had taken control of both banks of the reservoir.
