= Oleksiievo-Druzhkivka =

Urban locality in Donetsk Oblast, Ukraine

Oleksiievo-Druzhkivka Олексієво-Дружківка
- Rural settlement
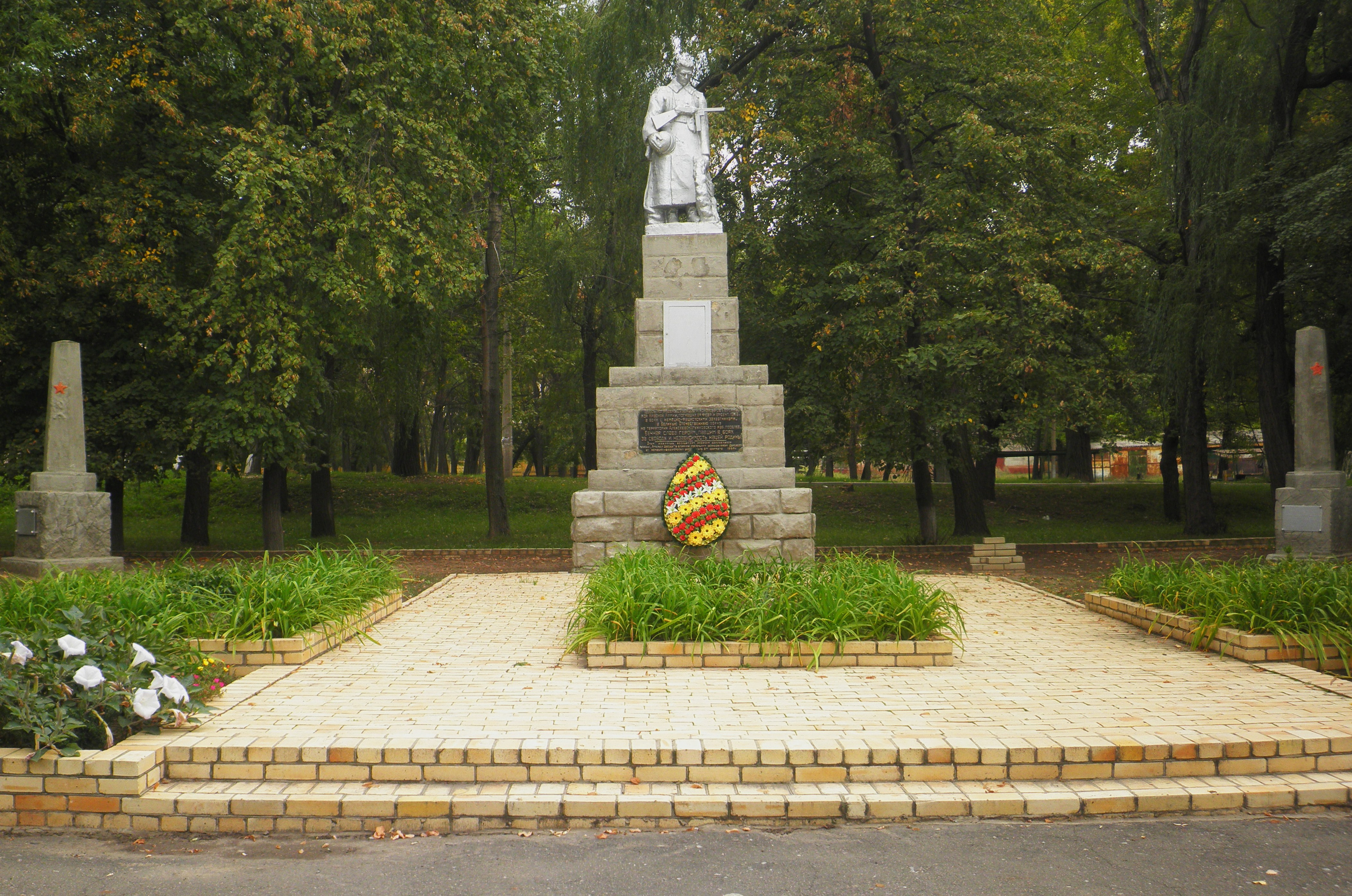
- Monument to the fallen Red Army soldiers.
- Interactive map of Oleksiievo-Druzhkivka
- Location of Oleksiievo-Druzhkivka in Donetsk Oblast Oleksiievo-Druzhkivka (Donetsk Oblast)
- Coordinates: 48°34′50″N 37°36′53″E
- Country: Ukraine
- Oblast: Donetsk Oblast
- Raion: Kramatorsk Raion
- Hromada: Druzhkivka urban hromada

Area
  - Total: 5.51 km^{2} (2.13 sq mi)
- Elevation: 84 m (276 ft)

Population (2022)
  - Total: 6,924
  - Density: 1,260/km^{2} (3,250/sq mi)
- Time zone: UTC+2
  - Summer (DST): UTC+3
- Postal code: 84293, 84294
- Area code: +380 6267

Oleksiievo-Druzhkivka (Ukrainian: Олексієво-Дружківка, Russian: Алексеево-Дружковка) is a rural settlement in Kramatorsk Raion, Donetsk Oblast, eastern Ukraine. Population: 6,924 (2022 estimate). The Druzhkivsky Stone Forest is nearby.

== Geography ==
Located on the Kryvyi Torets river. Situated along the railway, there is a Kindrativka station on the Donetsk Railway. National Highway H-20 passes through the village.

== History ==
It was formed as a result of the merger of the villages of Alekseyevka and Druzhkovka in 1938. In 1968, the population of Alekseevo-Druzhkovka was 8 thousand residents.

Until 18 July 2020, Oleksiievo-Druzhkivka was located in Druzhkivka Municipality. The municipality was abolished that day as part of the administrative reform of Ukraine, the number of raions of Donetsk Oblast was reduced to eight, of which only five were controlled by the government. Druzhkivka Municipality was merged into Kramatorsk Raion.

=== Russo-Ukrainian War ===
On October 16, 2026, Russian forces claimed full control of the settlement.

== Enterprises ==
- Kondratievsky Refractory Plant
- Druzhkivska Food Flavoring Factory

== Demographics ==
As of the 2001 Ukrainian census, the town had a population of 7,959, which decreased to 6,924 in 2022. The native languages in the settlement were as follows:

Native languages in Oleksiievo-Druzhkivka
	percent
Ukrainian	76.4%
Russian	23.2%
Belarusian	0.2%
others	0.2%

== Attractions ==
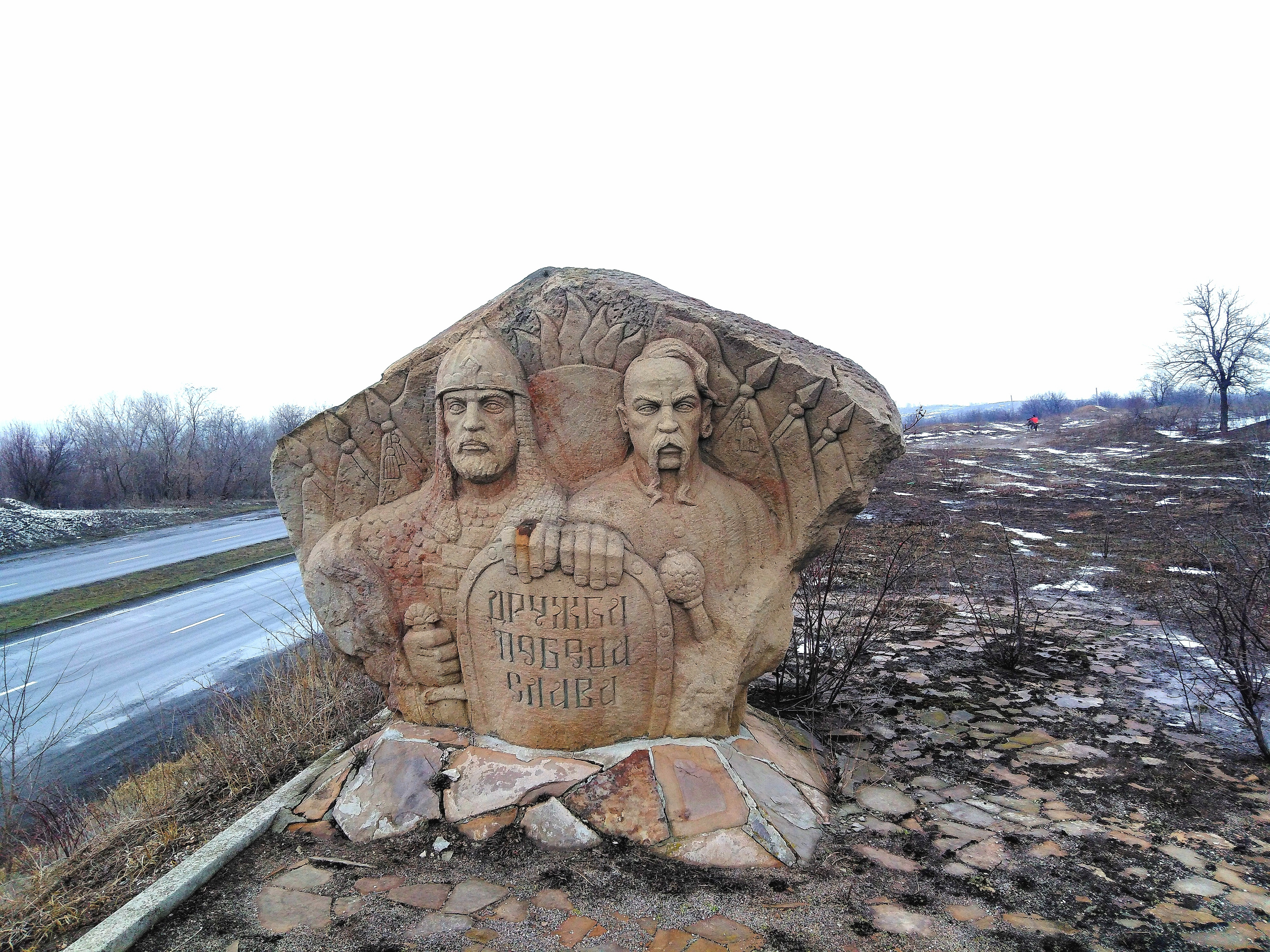
Monument to the Cossacks of Druzhkivka.

Half a kilometer from the village is a quarry 10-20 meters deep, with limestone outcrops. The quarry is home to the Druzhkivka Petrified Trees, a geological natural monument of national significance.

Monuments of the village:

- Monument at the mass grave of Soviet soldiers (1959);
- Monument to fallen fellow countrymen (1966, by L. V. Zolotchenko and B. I. Vasin);
- Monument to N. V. Nosula (1967, by Izboldin).

== Notable people ==
In the late village of Aleksevka, which formed Oleksiievo-Druzhkivka, Nikolai Vasilyevich Nosulya, Hero of the Soviet Union, was born.
