= Raiske (village), Donetsk Oblast =

Village in Donetsk Oblast, Ukraine

Raiske Райське
- Village
- Interactive map of Raiske
- Location of Raiske in Donetsk Oblast Raiske (Donetsk Oblast)
- Coordinates: 48°33′44″N 37°28′49″E
- Country: Ukraine
- Oblast: Donetsk Oblast
- Raion: Kramatorsk Raion
- Hromada: Druzhkivka urban hromada
- Elevation: 78 m (256 ft)

Population (2019)
  - Total: 83
- Time zone: UTC+2
  - Summer (DST): UTC+3
- Postal code: 85170
- Area code: +380 6272

Raiske (Ukrainian: Райське) is a village in Kramatorsk Raion of Donetsk Oblast, Ukraine.

Until 18 July 2020, Raiske was located in Kostiantynivka Raion. The raion was abolished that day as part of the administrative reform of Ukraine, the number of raions of Donetsk Oblast was reduced to eight, of which only five were controlled by the government. Kostiantynivka Raion was merged into Kramatorsk Raion.

== Demographics ==
According to the 2001 Ukrainian census, the village had a population of 83 people, of which 80.72% reported Ukrainian as their native language and 19.28% reported Russian as their native language.
