= Raiske (rural settlement), Kramatorsk Raion, Donetsk Oblast =

Urban locality in Donetsk Oblast, Ukraine

Raiske Райське
- Rural settlement
- Location of Rayske in Donetsk Oblast Raiske (Donetsk Oblast)
- Coordinates: 48°34′41″N 37°26′52″E
- Country: Ukraine
- Oblast: Donetsk Oblast
- Raion: Kramatorsk Raion
- Hromada: Druzhkivka urban hromada
- Elevation: 79 m (259 ft)

Population (2022)
  - Total: 757
  - Estimate (2025): 693
- Time zone: UTC+2
  - Summer (DST): UTC+3
- Postal code: 84291
- Area code: +380 6267

Raiske (Ukrainian: Райське) is a rural settlement in Kramatorsk Raion, Donetsk Oblast, eastern Ukraine. Population: 757 (2022 estimate).

Until 18 July 2020, Raiske was located in Druzhkivka Municipality. The municipality was abolished that day as part of the administrative reform of Ukraine, the number of raions of Donetsk Oblast was reduced to eight, of which only five were controlled by the government. Druzhkivka Municipality was merged into Kramatorsk Raion.
