= Krasnyi Kut, Donetsk Oblast =

Village in Donetsk Oblast, Ukraine

Krasnyi Kut Красний Кут
- Village
- Interactive map of Krasnyi Kut
- Location of Krasnyi Kut within Donetsk Oblast#Location of Krasnyi Kut within Ukraine Krasnyi Kut (Ukraine)
- Coordinates: 48°33′31″N 37°24′23″E
- Country: Ukraine
- Oblast: Donetsk Oblast
- District: Kramatorsk Raion
- Elevation: 80 m (260 ft)

Population (2001)
  - Total: 71
- Time zone: UTC+2 (EET)
  - Summer (DST): UTC+3 (EEST)
- Postal code: 94654
- Area code: +380 6431

Krasnyi Kut (Ukrainian: Красний Кут) is a village in Kramatorsk Raion (district) in Donetsk Oblast of eastern Ukraine.

== Demographics ==
Native language distribution as of the Ukrainian Census of 2001:

- Ukrainian: 77.46%
- Russian: 22.54%
