= Kazennyi Torets =

River in Donetsk Oblast, Ukraine

Kazennyi Torets Казенний Торець
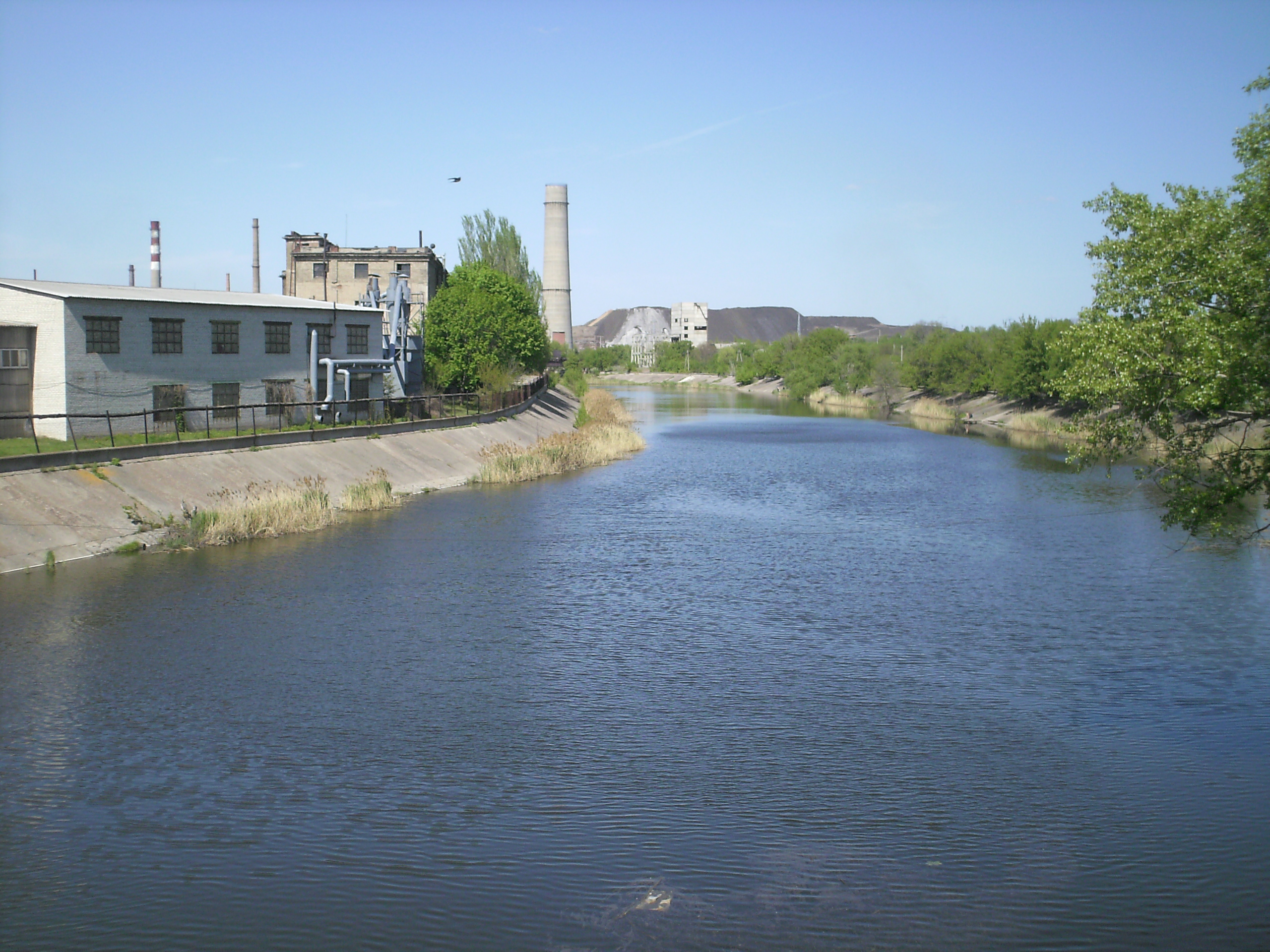
- The river near Kramatorsk

Location
- Country: Ukraine

Physical characteristics
- Source
  - location: Lozuvatske, Donetsk Oblast, Ukraine
  - coordinates: 48°16′12″N 37°30′37″E
- Mouth
  - location: Siverskyi Donets
  - coordinates: 48°53′40″N 37°45′35″E
- Length: 129 km (80 mi)
- Basin size: 5,410 km^{2} (2,090 sq mi)

Basin features
- Progression: Donets→ Don→ Sea of Azov
- River system: Don Basin

The Kazennyi Torets (Ukrainian: Казенний Торець; Russian: Казённый Торец) is a river in eastern Ukraine. The river travels in the Kramatorsk and Pokrovsk raions (districts) in the Donetsk Oblast, and is a right tributary of the Siverskyi Donets.

== Characteristics ==
The river has a total length of 88 kilometres (55 mi), and a basin size of 1,590 square kilometres (610 sq mi). The river begins in the village of Lozuvatske, near the city of Pokrovsk.

The river flows through the cities of Druzhkivka, Kramatorsk, and Sloviansk before flowing into the Siverskyi Donets in the town of Raihorodok.
