= Kryvyi Torets =

River in Donetsk Oblast, Ukraine

Kryvyi Torets Кривий Торець
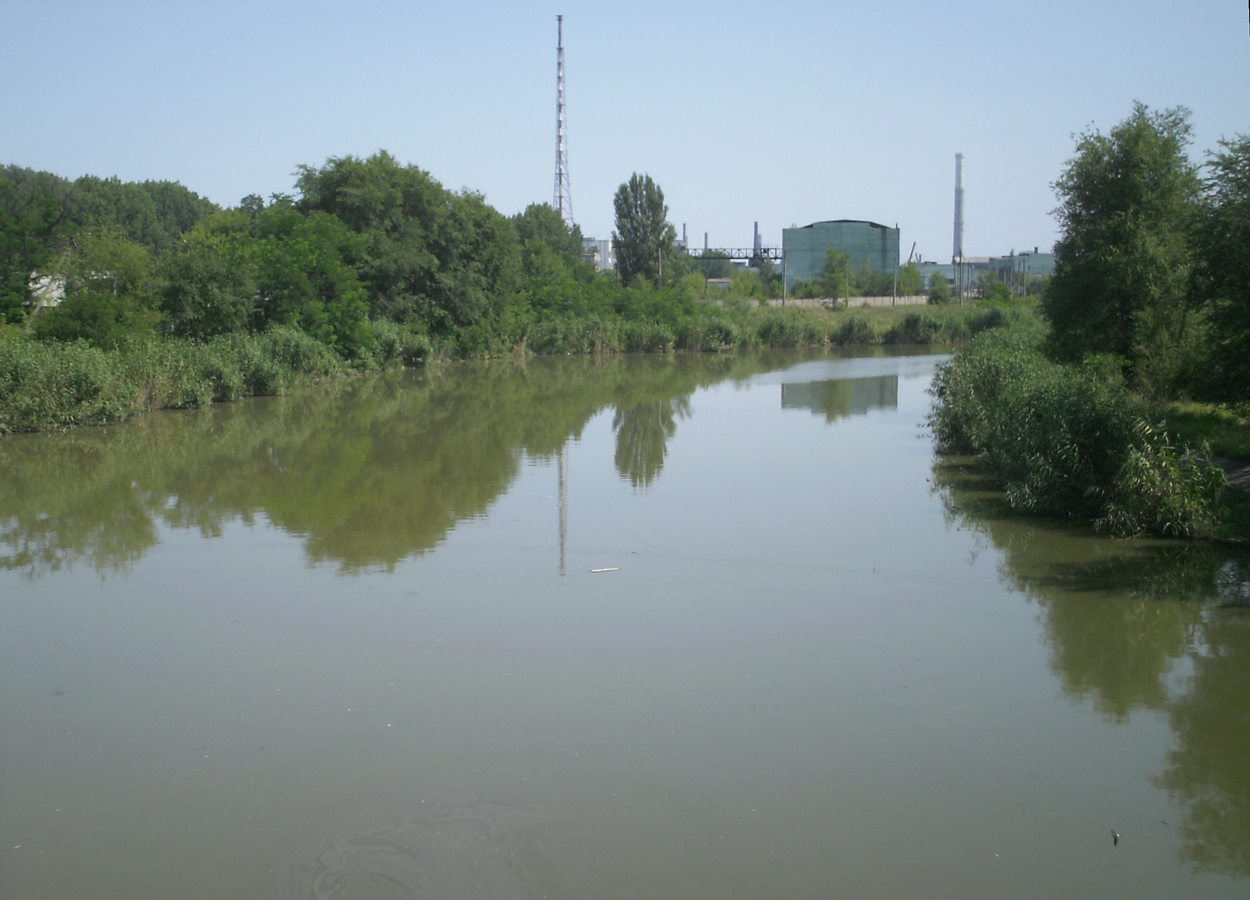
- The river near Kostiantynivka

Location
- Country: Ukraine

Physical characteristics
- Source
  - location: Riasne, Donetsk Oblast, Ukraine
  - coordinates: 48°09′55″N 38°01′34″E
- Mouth
  - location: Kazennyi Torets
  - coordinates: 48°38′37″N 37°31′39″E
- Length: 88 km (55 mi)
- Basin size: 1,590 km^{2} (610 sq mi)

Basin features
- Progression: Donets→ Don→ Sea of Azov
- River system: Don Basin

The Kryvyi Torets (Ukrainian: Кривий Торець; Russian: Кривой Торец) is a river in eastern Ukraine. The river travels in the Pokrovsk, Horlivka, and Kramatorsk Districts in the Donetsk Oblast, and is a right tributary of the Kazennyi Torets.

== Characteristics ==
The river has a total length of 88 kilometres (55 mi), and a basin size of 1,590 square kilometres (610 sq mi). The river begins in the village of Riasne, near the city of Makiivka.

The river flows through the cities of Niu-York, Toretsk, and Kostiantynivka before flowing into the Kazennyi Torets in the city of Druzhkivka.

== Ecology ==
The water in the river is highly polluted. According to data collected in 2005, the iron content in a section near Kostiantynivka exceeded regulation by more than threefold, and sulfate by almost two. In addition, there is a burial site for radioactive substances near an industrial landfill around the city.
