= Mykolaivka, Soledar urban hromada, Bakhmut Raion, Donetsk Oblast =

Mykolaivka Миколаївка
- Village
- Location within Donetsk Oblast Location within Ukraine
- Coordinates: 48°44′40″N 38°3′6″E
- Country: Ukraine
- Oblast: Donetsk Oblast
- Raion: Bakhmut Raion
- Hromada: Soledar urban hromada
- Elevation: 68 m (223 ft)

Population (2001)
  - Total: 43
- Postal code: 84540
- Area code: +380-6274

Mykolaivka (Ukrainian: Миколаївка) is a village located in Bakhmut Raion of Donetsk Oblast, Ukraine. It is located approximately 15 kilometres (9.3 mi) north of Bakhmut.

== History ==
On 2 February 2023, during the Russian invasion of Ukraine, Wagner Group leader Yevgeny Prigozhin claimed that his troops captured the village as well as Sakko i Vantsetti, a hamlet to the north of the village.

== Demographics ==
As of the 2001 Ukrainian Census there were 43 people living in the settlement, 30 (69.77%) were Ukrainian speakers, 13 (30.32%) were Russian speakers.

== See also ==
- List of villages in Donetsk Oblast
