= 10th Mountain Assault Brigade =

Ukrainian Ground Forces unit

- 10-та окрема гірсько-штурмова бригада
- Shoulder Sleeve Insignia
- Active: October 1, 2015 – present
- Country: Ukraine
- Branch: Ukrainian Ground Forces
- Type: Assault Infantry
- Part of: Operational Command West
- Garrison/HQ: Kolomyia, Ivano-Frankivsk Oblast
- Motto: With a shield or on a shield!
- Engagements: Russo-Ukrainian War: 2023 Ukrainian counteroffensive

The 10th Mountain Assault Brigade "Edelweiss" (Ukrainian: 10-та окрема гірсько-штурмова бригада "Едельвейс") is a unit of the Ukrainian Ground Forces. Based in Kolomyia and part of Operational Command West, the brigade has fought in the war in Donbas, and the 2022 Russian invasion of Ukraine. During these conflicts, the brigade defended Marinka, Popasna, Mariupol and Bakhmut.

== History ==
The 10th Mountain Assault Brigade was formed on 1 October 2015, in Kolomyia, as part of the Operational Command West. Its formation was driven by the need to protect Northern Bukovina from potential Romanian territorial claims and to prepare for any future conflict with Russia. The brigade was composed of experienced soldiers and volunteers, including the 24th Separate Assault Battalion "Aidar". Its first commander, Colonel Vasyl Zubanych, was a Hero of Ukraine and a former battalion commander in the 128th Mechanized Brigade. To attract new recruits, the brigade offered a 25% pay increase to volunteers who joined the brigade on a contract basis. In January 2016, the Ukrainian Ministry of Defence reported that the brigade was ready to begin its combat training. The brigade was stationed at Bila Tserkva and later relocated to Kolomyia once new barracks were completed. In February 2016, the Ukrainian Ground Forces decided to form a new Bukovina mountain battalion in Chernivtsi, and the 8th Separate Motorized Infantry Battalion and the 46th Separate Special-Purpose Battalion "Donbas-Ukraine" were added to the brigade's roster.

Starting on 25 May 2016, the brigade was deployed to the ATO zone. The brigade was deployed to defend the areas around Marinka and Krasnohorivka. On 24 August 2016, the Independence Day of Ukraine, the brigade was presented with its battle flag by President Petro Poroshenko, recognizing their bravery and dedication in defending their country. During its first tour in the Donbas war, the brigade lost 22 which were killed in action before the end of the deployment. After completing its tour in the Donbas, the brigade returned to Kolomyia in November 2016.

The 24th Assault and 46th Separate Special Purpose Battalions were withdrawn from the brigade due to the desire to station them closer to their homes, as 80% of their personnel were from eastern Ukraine. The brigade underwent further reorganization after its first deployment to the war in Donbas from May to November 2016. In December 2016, the 108th and 109th Separate Mountain Assault Battalions were established to replace the previously withdrawn 24th Assault and 46th Separate Special Purpose Battalions. The brigade resumed its mountain training, including a climb to Veliky Verkh and to the summit of Hoverla, the tallest peak in Ukraine, to honor the Ukrainian casualties of the Battle of Debaltseve. In September 2017, the brigade was deployed again to the Donbas to defend positions around Popasna, with a soldier being killed in action on 23 September during fighting at Novooleksandrivka.

=== Russian invasion of Ukraine ===
==== Operations in the Kyiv Oblast (2022) ====
The brigade was reported to have taken part in the defense of the country in battles around Mariupol in February 2022.

In mid-March 2022, units of the brigade's 109th Battalion captured the village of Kukhari in Kyiv Oblast, preventing a potential Russian breakthrough towards Kyiv. On 11 March 2022, 19 members of the brigade's 108th Battalion were killed by a Russian airstrike on their position in the village of Liudvynivka, Kyiv Oblast.

==== Operations on the Siversk front (2022–present) ====
The 10th Brigade was first deployed positions on the Siversk front in the Donetsk Oblast in September 2022, and would go on to hold the defense in this area for more than two years.

By November 2022, the 10th Brigade was taking part in combat in the Donetsk Oblast, and the next month, it was reported that the brigade was involved in combat around Bakhmut. On 14 February 2023, the brigade was granted the Edelweiss honorific by President Volodymyr Zelenskyy in honor of its mountain troops traditions. In March 2023, the 10th Brigade announced that its fighters had shot down a Russian fighter jet near the village of Berestove near Bakhmut using a Polish Piorun anti-aircraft missile.

As of September 2024, the brigade's 108th Battalion and its motorized battalion were operating on the Siversk front. During December 2024, elements of the brigade's 8th Battalion took part in an operation to recapture the village of Novomlynsk in the Kharkiv region. During December 2024, the brigade's 109th Battalion defended the village of Vyimka in the Donetsk Oblast. As of January 2025, the brigade's 108th Battalion was also operating on the Siversk front.

On December 27, 2025, Ukrainska Pravda reported that the brigade commander, Colonel Volodymyr Potieshkin, was removed from his post following the fall of Siversk. According to the publication, the brigade command falsified reports about holding positions that were in fact empty.

== Structure ==
As of 2023, the brigade's structure is as follows:

- 10th Mountain Assault Brigade, Kolomyia, Ivano-Frankivsk Oblast
  - Brigade Headquarters and HQ Company
  - 8th Mountain Assault Infantry Battalion
  - 108th Mountain Assault Infantry Battalion
  - 109th Mountain Assault Infantry Battalion
  - Tank Battalion
  - 10th Mountain Artillery Regiment
    - Regimental HQ and Target Acquisition Battery
    - Observer Battery
    - 1st Mountain Artillery Battalion (Towed)
    - 2nd Mountain Artillery Battalion (Self-Propelled)
  - Anti-Aircraft Missile Defense Artillery Battalion
  - Reconnaissance battalion
  - Mountain Combat Engineer Battalion
  - Logistic Battalion
  - Maintenance Battalion
  - Signal Company
  - Radar Company
  - Medical Company
  - CBRN Protection Company
  - MP Platoon
  - Brigade Band

== See also ==
- Andrii Skibin
