= Pryvillia (disambiguation) =

Pryvillia (Ukrainian: Привілля) may refer to the following places in Ukraine:

== City ==
- Pryvillia, a city in Luhansk Oblast

== Villages ==
- Pryvillia, Kamianske Raion, Dnipropetrovsk Oblast
- Pryvillia, Synelnykove Raion, Dnipropetrovsk Oblast
- Pryvillia, Bakhmut Raion, Donetsk Oblast
- Pryvillia, Kramatorsk urban hromada, Kramatorsk Raion, Donetsk Oblast
- Pryvillia, Cherkaske settlement hromada, Kramatorsk Raion, Donetsk Oblast
- Pryvillia, Kirovohrad Oblast
- Pryvillia, Svatove Raion, Luhansk Oblast
- Pryvillia, Mykolaiv Oblast
- Pryvillia, Odesa Oblast
- Pryvillia, Sumy Oblast
- Pryvillia, Blyzniuky settlement hromada, Lozova Raion, Kharkiv Oblast
- Pryvillia, Lozova urban hromada, Lozova Raion, Kharkiv Oblast
- Pryvillia, Kherson Oblast

== See also ==
- Pryvitne
