= Spirne =

Rural settlement in Donetsk Oblast, Ukraine

Spirne Спі́рне
- Rural settlement
- Location of Spirne within Donetsk Oblast Spirne (Ukraine)
- Coordinates: 48.807°N 38.246°E
- Country: Ukraine (de jure) Russia (de facto)
- Oblast: Donetsk
- Raion: Bakhmut Raion
- Hromada: Soledar urban hromada
- Elevation: 174 m (571 ft)

Population (2001)
  - Total: 79
- Time zone: UTC+2
  - Summer (DST): UTC+3 (EEST)
- Postal code: 84541
- Area code: +380 6274

Spirne (Ukrainian: Спі́рне; Russian: Спорное; lit. "disputed") is a rural settlement in Bakhmut Raion, Donetsk Oblast, Ukraine. It belongs to the Soledar urban hromada, one of the hromadas of Ukraine.

A gas compression station and farm are located in the settlement, and the Mount Vesuvius Nature Reserve is located nearby.

== History ==
=== Russo-Ukrainian War ===
==== Russian invasion of Ukraine ====
In July 2022, during and after the Battle of Siversk, the settlement was a site of heavy fighting between Russia and Ukraine. It was contested by Russia between August and September 2022, but was not captured by Russia during that period. It was again contested between late December 2023 and late June – early July 2024. Russian forces reached the eastern outskirts of the settlement on December 27, 2023. The Russian Ministry of Defense claimed their forces to have seized the village on June 30, and this was confirmed by the Institute for the Study of War on 19 July through the capture of the village to the northwest, Ivano-Daryivka, on 17 July.

On June 21, 2025, during the Battle of Siversk, the village of Spirne was completely controlled by Russian forces.

== Demographics ==
As of the 2001 Ukrainian census, the settlement had 79 inhabitants, whose native languages were 70.00% Ukrainian and 30.00% Russian.
