= Pereizne =

Pereizne Переїзне
- Village
- Location within Donetsk Oblast Location within Ukraine
- Coordinates: 48°46′57″N 38°4′42″E
- Country: Ukraine
- Oblast: Donetsk Oblast
- Raion: Bakhmut Raion
- Hromada: Zvanivka rural hromada
- Elevation: 69 m (226 ft)

Population
  - Total: 668
- Postal code: 84528
- Area code: +380-6274

Pereizne (Ukrainian: Переїзне) is a village located in Bakhmut Raion of Donetsk Oblast, eastern Ukraine. Administratively, it is part of Zvanivka rural hromada, one of the hromadas of Ukraine.

== History ==
On 29 January 2023, during the Russian invasion of Ukraine, the village reportedly came under Russian shelling. On 29 February 2024, a person was killed in the village by Russian shelling. On 23 September 2025, Russian forces took the town.

== See also ==
- List of villages in Donetsk Oblast
