= Nahirne, Donetsk Oblast =

Nahirne Нагірне
- Rural settlement
- Location within Donetsk Oblast Location within Ukraine
- Coordinates: 48°44′23″N 38°14′27″E
- Country: Ukraine
- Oblast: Donetsk Oblast
- Raion: Bakhmut Raion
- Hromada: Soledar urban hromada
- Elevation: 193 m (633 ft)

Population
  - Total: 14
- Postal code: 84541
- Area code: +380-6274

Nahirne (Ukrainian: Нагірне) is a rural settlement in Bakhmut Raion, Donetsk Oblast, Ukraine. It is located 20 kilometres (12 mi) northeast of Bakhmut.

== History ==
On 28 July 2022, during the Russian invasion of Ukraine, the Ukrainian military reported that Russian forces conducted unsuccessful reconnaissance operations towards the settlement due to its location on the T1302 road.
