= Fedorivka, Bakhmut Raion, Donetsk Oblast =

Fedorivka Федорівка
- Village
- Location within Donetsk Oblast Location within Ukraine
- Coordinates: 48°46′07″N 38°3′00″E
- Country: Ukraine
- Oblast: Donetsk Oblast
- Raion: Bakhmut Raion
- Hromada: Soledar urban hromada
- Elevation: 66 m (217 ft)

Population (April 2023)
  - Total: 26
- Postal code: 84530
- Area code: +380-6274

Fedorivka (Ukrainian: Федорівка) is a village located in Bakhmut Raion of Donetsk Oblast, Ukraine. It is located 15 kilometres (9.3 mi) northeast of Bakhmut.

== History ==
On 7 March 2023, during the Russian invasion of Ukraine, it was reported that the Ukrainian military repelled advances towards the village by Russian forces.

== See also ==
- List of villages in Donetsk Oblast
