= Pylypchatyne =

Pylypchatyne Пилипчатине
- Village
- Location within Donetsk Oblast Location within Ukraine
- Coordinates: 48°36′46″N 38°15′33″E
- Country: Ukraine
- Oblast: Donetsk Oblast
- Raion: Bakhmut Raion
- Hromada: Soledar urban hromada
- Elevation: 131 m (430 ft)

Population
  - Total: 70
- Postal code: 84560
- Area code: +380-6274

Pylypchatyne (Ukrainian: Пилипчатине) is a village located in Bakhmut Raion of Donetsk Oblast, eastern Ukraine. Administratively, it is part of Soledar urban hromada, one of the hromadas of Ukraine.

== History ==
In 2022, during the Russian invasion of Ukraine, dozens of cottages in the village were destroyed by Russian shelling.

== See also ==
- List of villages in Donetsk Oblast
