= Sakko i Vantsetti =

Village in Donetsk Oblast, Ukraine

Sakko i Vantsetti Сакко і Ванцетті
- Village
- Location of Sakko I Vantsetti Sakko i Vantsetti (Ukraine)
- Coordinates: 48°44′46″N 38°01′54″E
- Country: Ukraine
- Oblast: Donetsk Oblast
- Raion: Bakhmut Raion
- Hromada: Soledar urban hromada
- Founded: 1923/1924
- Elevation: 77 m (253 ft)

Population (2001 census)
  - Total: 3
- Time zone: UTC+2 (EET)
  - Summer (DST): UTC+3 (EEST)
- Postal code: 84530
- Area code: +380 6274

Sakko i Vantsetti (Ukrainian: Сакко і Ванцетті; Russian: Сакко и Ванцетти, transl. Sacco and Vanzetti) is a village in Bakhmut Raion (district) in Donetsk Oblast, eastern Ukraine. It is part of Soledar urban hromada, one of the hromadas of Ukraine.

== History ==
Sakko i Vantsetti was originally created as a commune in the Soviet Union in 1923–1924. It was closely connected to nearby Vasiukivka. It was named after the Italian anarchists Nicola Sacco and Bartolomeo Vanzetti, who were controversially convicted in 1921 of murdering a paymaster and a security guard at a shoe factory in the United States, executed in 1927 and rehabilitated in 1977 by Massachusetts Governor Michael Dukakis. Soviet propaganda celebrated Sacco and Vanzetti as unjustly accused proletarians and revolutionaries.

Amid the Russian invasion of Ukraine, on February 1, 2023, Yevgeny Prigozhin claimed his Wagner Group paramilitary fighters had captured Sakko i Vantsetti, posting a photograph purporting to show four of his soldiers posing in front of what they called "the only surviving house" in the village. By the middle of May 2023, Russian forces were claimed to have retreated from the village following local Ukrainian counterattacks, but recaptured it in June.

== Demographics ==
The 1989 Census in the Ukrainian SSR of the Soviet Union recorded a total population of 19 in Sakko i Vantsetti, 12 men and 7 women. The population declined by the time of the first independent Ukrainian Census of 2001, which recorded 3 inhabitants in the village, 100% (3) of them reported Ukrainian as their native language.
