= Dibrova, Bakhmut Raion, Donetsk Oblast =

Dibrova Діброва
- Village
- Location within Donetsk Oblast Location within Ukraine
- Coordinates: 48°45′52″N 37°49′58″E
- Country: Ukraine
- Oblast: Donetsk Oblast
- Raion: Bakhmut Raion
- Hromada: Soledar urban hromada
- Elevation: 87 m (285 ft)

Population
  - Total: 22
- Postal code: 84531
- Area code: +380-6274

Dibrova (Ukrainian: Діброва) is a village located in Bakhmut Raion of Donetsk Oblast, eastern Ukraine. Administratively, it is part of Soledar urban hromada, one of the hromadas of Ukraine.

== History ==
On 13 May 2024, during the Russian invasion of Ukraine, a Russian attack killed a resident of the village.

== See also ==
- List of villages in Donetsk Oblast
