= Vesele, Bakhmut Raion, Donetsk Oblast =

Vesele Веселе
- Village
- Location within Donetsk Oblast Location within Ukraine
- Coordinates: 48°44′46″N 38°9′7″E
- Country: Ukraine
- Oblast: Donetsk Oblast
- Raion: Bakhmut Raion
- Hromada: Soledar urban hromada
- Elevation: 95 m (312 ft)

Population (2001)
  - Total: 102
  - Estimate (2022): 0
- Postal code: 84542
- Area code: +380-6274

Vesele (Ukrainian: Веселе) is a village located in Bakhmut Raion of Donetsk Oblast, Ukraine. It is located 20 kilometres (12 mi) northeast of Bakhmut.

== History ==
=== Russo-Ukrainian War ===
==== Russian invasion of Ukraine ====
On 8 September 2023, during the Russian invasion of Ukraine, the Russian Ministry of Defense claimed that the Ukrainian military engaged in operations near the village. On 18 January 2024, the Russian defence ministry claimed Russian troops captured Vesele after a local offensive. The ministry's claims could not be independently verified at the time.

== See also ==
- List of villages in Donetsk Oblast
