= Trypillia (disambiguation) =

Trypillia or Trypillya (Ukrainian: Трипілля) may refer to the following:

== Places ==
- Trypillia, a village in Kyiv Oblast, Ukraine
- Trypillia, Donetsk Oblast, a village in Donetsk Oblast, Ukraine
- Trypillya-Dniprovske railway station, a railway station in Ukrainka, Kyiv Oblast, Ukraine

== Culture ==
- Cucuteni–Trypillia culture, a Neolithic–Chalcolithic archaeological culture of Southeast Europe
- Three-field system, referred to in Ukraine as Trypillia, a regime of crop rotation
- The Trypillia Tragedy, a 1926 Soviet drama film by Alexander Anoschenko-Anoda
- Trypilske kolo, an eco-cultural and world music festival in Rzhyshchiv, Kyiv Oblast, Ukraine

== Other ==
- Trypilska thermal power plant, also called Trypillia, a former thermal power station in Kyiv Oblast, Ukraine
- Trypillia (coin), a commemorative bimetallic coin issued by the National Bank of Ukraine

== See also ==
- Trypia
