= Pazeno =

Pazeno Пазено
- Village
- Location within Donetsk Oblast Location within Ukraine
- Coordinates: 48°46′2″N 37°58′30″E
- Country: Ukraine
- Oblast: Donetsk Oblast
- Raion: Bakhmut Raion
- Hromada: Soledar urban hromada
- Elevation: 166 m (545 ft)

Population
  - Total: 16
- Postal code: 84530
- Area code: +380-6274

Pazeno (Ukrainian: Пазено) is a village located in Bakhmut Raion of Donetsk Oblast, eastern Ukraine. Administratively, it is part of Soledar urban hromada, one of the hromadas of Ukraine.

== History ==
On 14 February 2024, during the Russian invasion of Ukraine, the village came under Russian shelling. On 23 November 2025, the village came under full control of the Russian forces.

== See also ==
- List of villages in Donetsk Oblast
