= Verkhnokamianske =

Village in Donetsk Oblast, Ukraine

Verkhnokamianske Верхньокам'янське
- Village
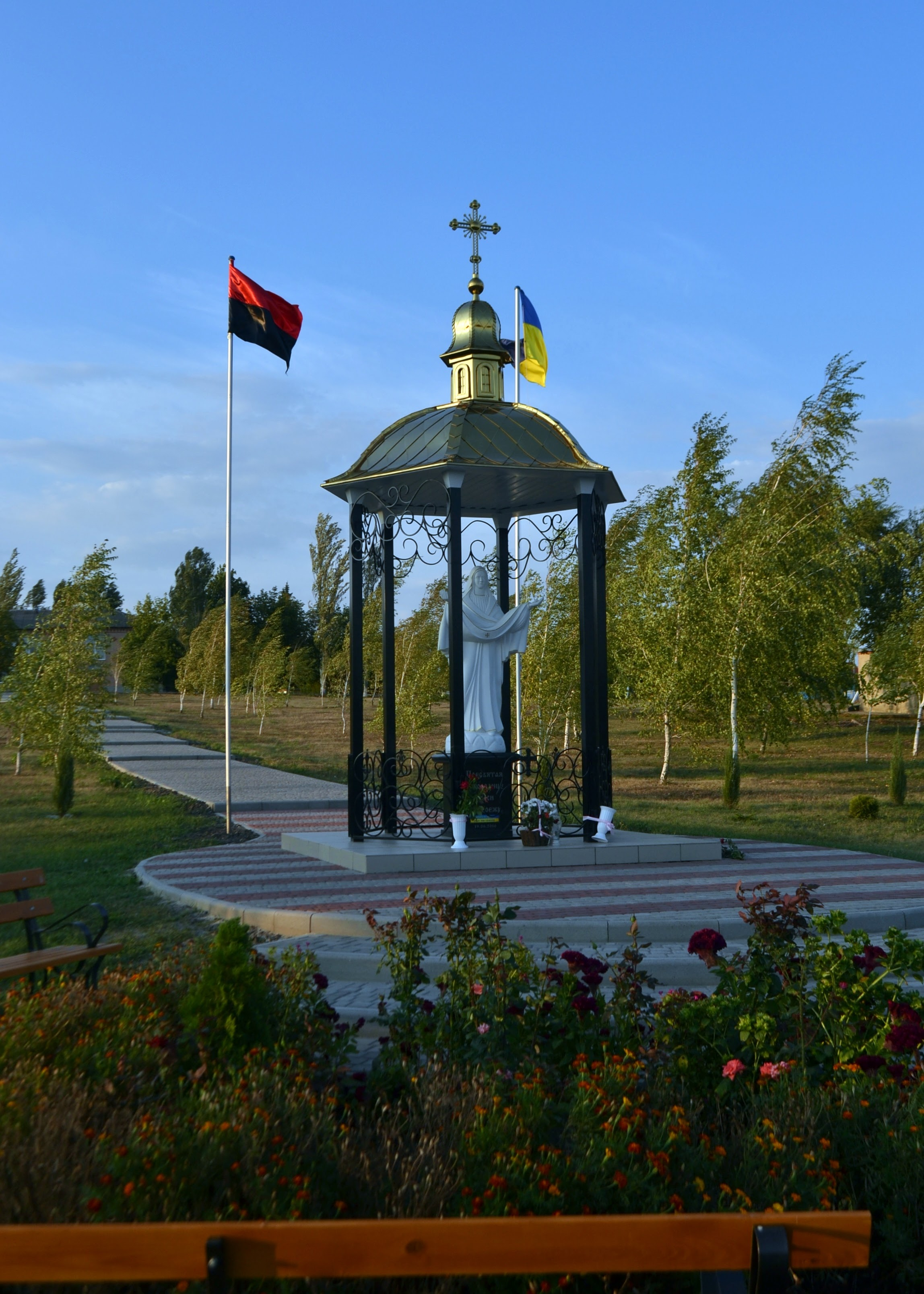

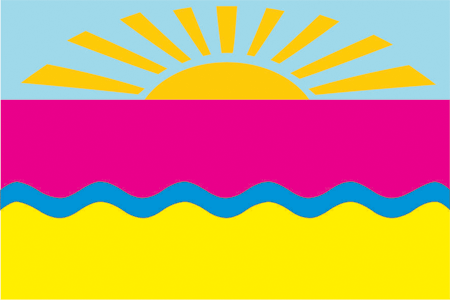
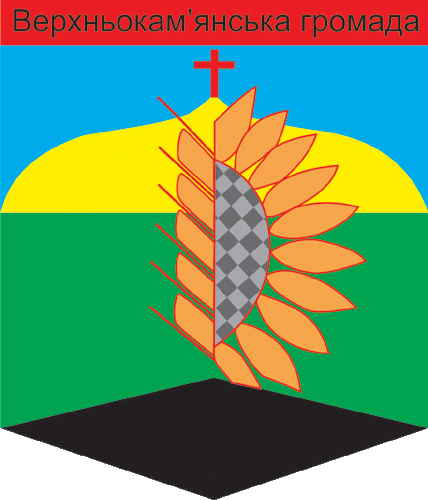
- Flag Coat of arms

- Location within Donetsk Oblast Location within Ukraine
- Coordinates: 48°51′37″N 38°11′48″E
- Country: Ukraine
- Oblast: Donetsk Oblast
- Raion: Bakhmut Raion
- Hromada: Zvanivka rural hromada

Population (2001)
  - Total: 960

Verkhnokamianske (Ukrainian: Верхньокам'янське) is a village (selo) in Ukraine, in Bakhmut Raion, Donetsk Oblast. It had a population of 960 at the 2001 Ukrainian census.

== Geography ==
The Kamianka River, a tributary of the Bakhmutka river, flows through the village.

== History ==
=== 20th century ===
As a result of the Holodomor, a manmade famine in Soviet Ukraine from 1932 to 1933, 18 residents of the village died.

After World War II, Verkhnokamianske was one of the destinations for Boykos deported from regions that were transferred to Poland from the Soviet Union in 1951.

=== 21st century ===
In 2014, during the opening stages of the Russo-Ukrainian War, Verkhnokamianske was seized by forces of the separatist, pro-Russian Donetsk People's Republic, led by Russian army veteran and former FSB officer Igor Girkin. On July 24, the village was announced to have been recaptured by Ukrainian security forces.

During the 2022 Russian invasion of Ukraine, Verkhnokamianske saw fighting again. On 7 August 2022, the General Staff of the Ukrainian Armed Forces claimed that Russian forces conducted assaults to try to improve its position near Verkhnokamianske, but "was unsuccessful and retreated." By late 2022, the population of the village had decreased to around 20. On 5 February 2023, Ukrainian forces reportedly repelled Russian assaults on the village. By 30 July 2025, the village was captured by Russian forces.

== Demographics ==
In 2001, it had 960 inhabitants, of whom 918 spoke Ukrainian and 42 spoke Russian.

== Culture ==
The Ukrainian Greek Catholic Church operates a Church of the Nativity of the Most Holy Theotokos in the village.
