= Zaliznianske =

Zaliznianske Залізнянське
- Village
- Location within Donetsk Oblast Location within Ukraine
- Coordinates: 48°42′04″N 37°56′47″E
- Country: Ukraine
- Oblast: Donetsk Oblast
- Raion: Bakhmut Raion
- Hromada: Soledar urban hromada

Area
  - Total: 79.6 km^{2} (30.7 sq mi)
- Elevation: 145 m (476 ft)

Population (2022)
  - Total: 0
- Postal code: 84536
- Area code: +380-6274

Zaliznianske (Ukrainian: Залізнянське; Russian: Зализнянское, romanized: Zaliznyanskoye) is a village located in Bakhmut Raion of Donetsk Oblast, Ukraine. It is located 13 kilometres (8.1 mi) north of Bakhmut. According to the 2001 Ukrainian census, 2 people lived in the village, both of whom spoke Ukrainian.

== History ==
Yevgeny Prigozhin, head of the Wagner Group, claimed his forces had captured the village for Russia in March 2023 during the Russian invasion of Ukraine. On 16 July 2023, report that Ukrainian forces had liberated the village during the broader 2023 Ukrainian counteroffensive was unconfirmed.

== See also ==
- List of villages in Donetsk Oblast
