= Chasiv Yar =

City in Donetsk Oblast, Ukraine

Chasiv Yar Часів Яр
- City
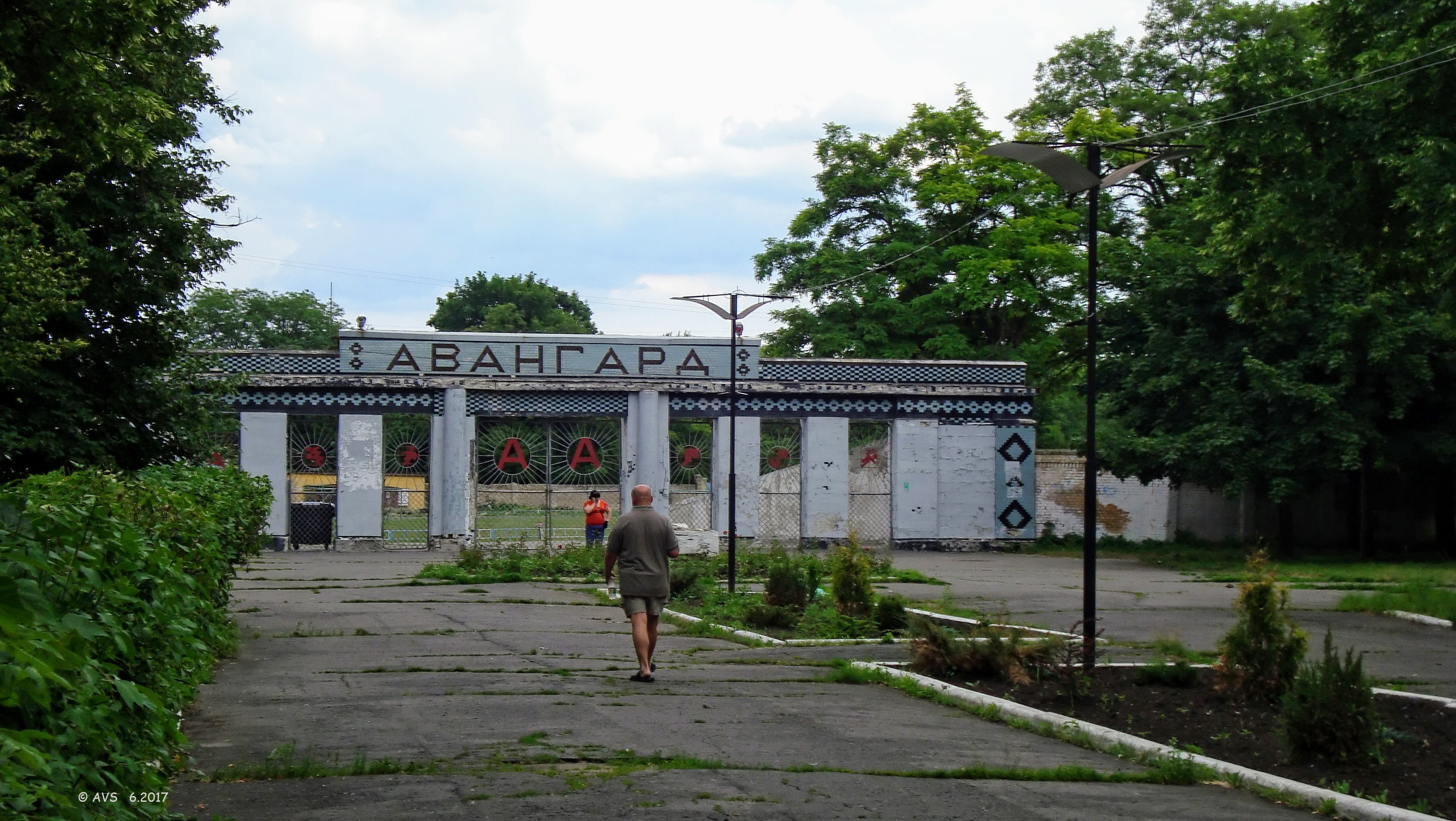
- Avanhard Stadium, 2017

- Flag Coat of arms
- Interactive map of Chasiv Yar
- Location within Donetsk Oblast Location within Ukraine
- Coordinates: 48°35′18.39″N 37°50′9.18″E
- Country: Ukraine
- Oblast: Donetsk Oblast
- Raion: Bakhmut Raion
- Hromada: Chasiv Yar urban hromada
- Boroughs: Microdistricts/Microraions: Desyata Microraion Kanal Microraion Novyi Microraion Pivnichnyi Microraion Shevchenko Microraion Zhovtnevyi Microraion

Government
  - Type: Martial law
  - Body: Chasiv Yar CMA
  - Chasiv Yar Military Administration: Serhiy Chaus

Area
  - Total: 18 km^{2} (6.9 sq mi)
- Elevation: 227 m (745 ft)

Population (2022)
  - Total: 12,250
  - Estimate (2025): 400
- Website: chasovrada.gov.ua

Chasiv Yar (Ukrainian: Часів Яр, pronounced [ˈtʃɑs⁽ʲ⁾iu̯ ˈjɑr]) is a city in Bakhmut Raion, Donetsk Oblast, Ukraine. Largely in ruins since the mid-2020s as a result of the Russo-Ukraine War, the January 2022 pre-war population of 12,250 had decreased to approximately 600 by May 2024 due to evacuations from Russian shelling and fighting within the city, according to RBC News.

It is located 10 kilometres (6.2 mi) west of Bakhmut and was the administrative center of Chasiv Yar urban hromada before the war.

The Siverskyi Donets – Donbas Canal runs through the east of Chasiv Yar. Just a small part of the city – the Kanal microdistrict – is east of the canal.

== History ==
=== Early development ===
Chasiv Yar as a notable settlement can be traced back to 1876 when a Russian noble established a refractory site to process local clay that is abundant in the area. Originally known as Hruzke or Pleshcheieve, the settlement grew alongside the clay industry. These industries played a pivotal role in the economic growth of the region, attracting settlers and laborers to the area.

=== 20th century ===
Chasiv Yar achieved Soviet city status in 1938 following the 1937 Soviet Census, marking a significant milestone in its development. During the Second World War, from October 1941 to September 1943, the city was occupied by Axis troops. Later, the restoration of the city began. Clay production was modernized after the war and new plants were built for the manufacture of electronics, metals and the traditional clay products (refractory materials). Four secondary schools, two seven-year schools, an FZO school, two Palaces of Culture, 14 libraries, four clubs and two stadiums were in Chasiv Yar by 1957 during the Soviet period.

In January 1989, at the time of the 1989 Soviet census, the population of Chasiv Yar was 19,804 people. A large factor in the local economy was the extraction of refractory clays and the production of refractory products.

In January 2020 the population was 12,500 people.

=== Russo-Ukrainian War ===
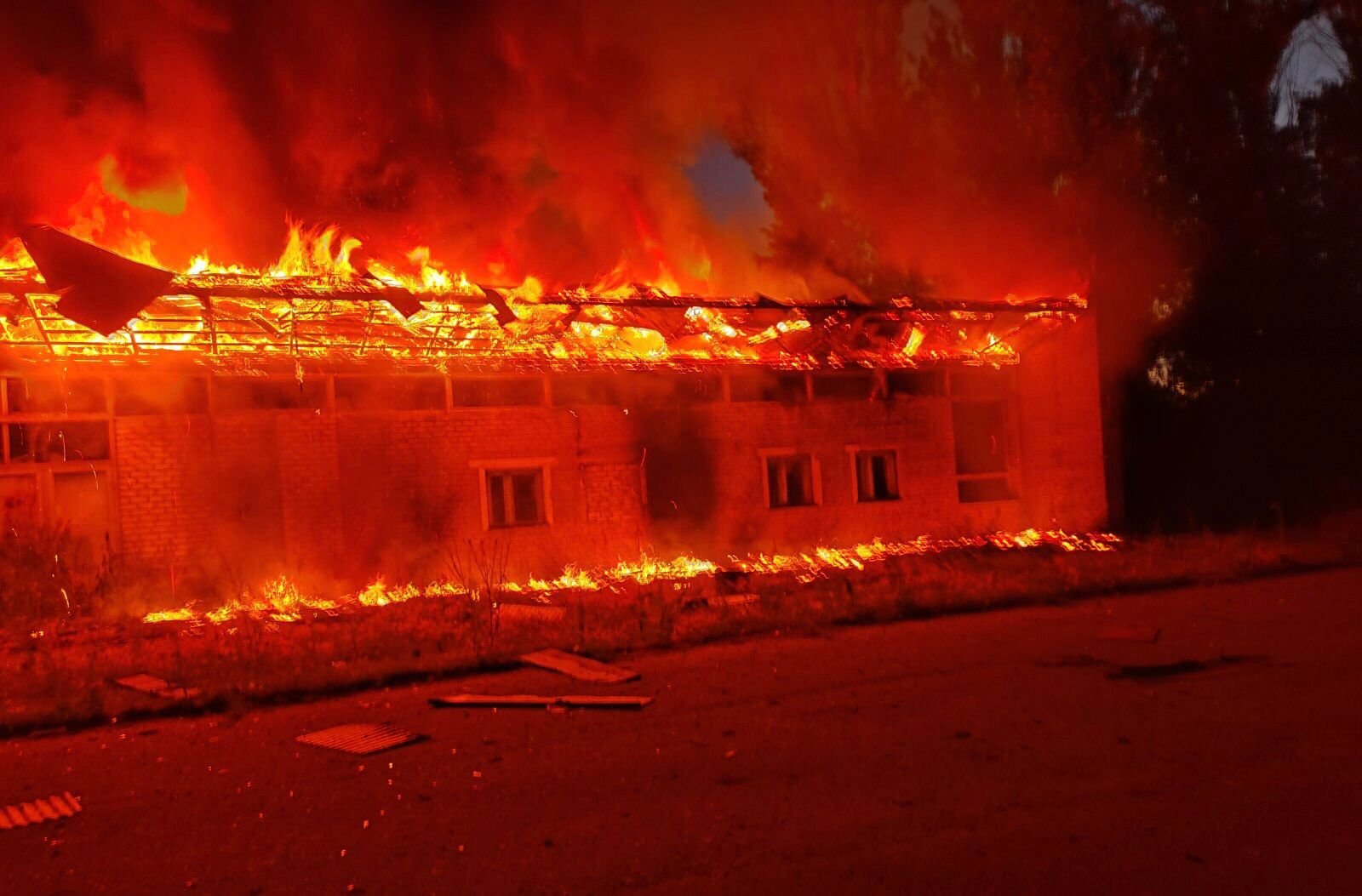
The Chasiv Yar railway station burning in 2022 after Russian rocket strikes

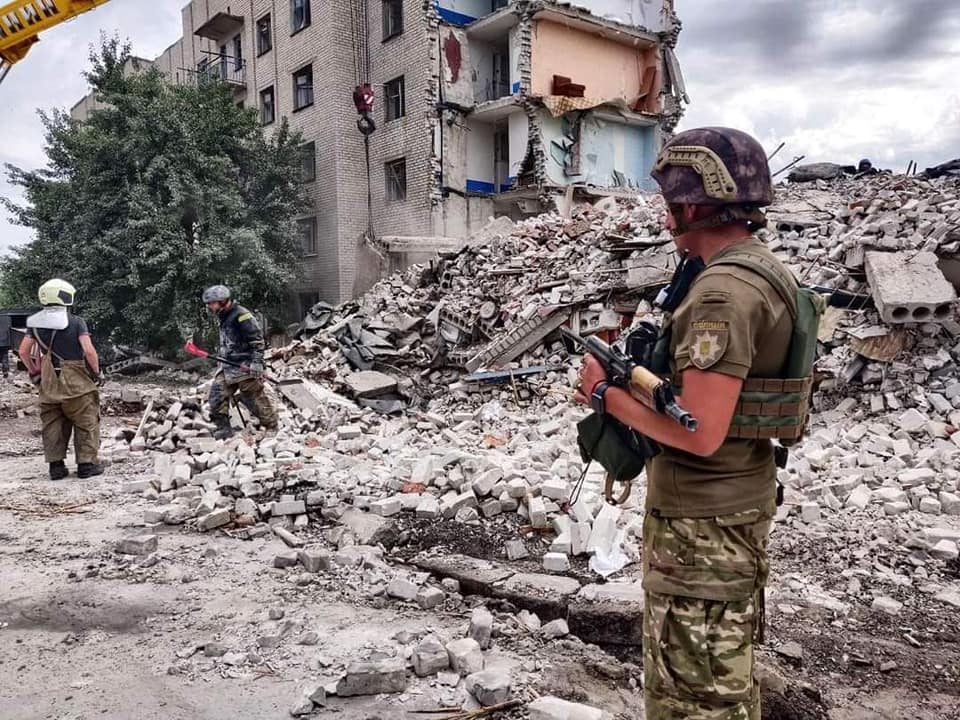
Ukrainian policemen inspecting a collapsed residential building after Russian rocket strikes in July 2022.

Shortly before the Russian invasion of Ukraine, the city's civilian mayor fled. In his place, Ukrainian military officials established martial law under the Chasiv Yar Military Civilian Administration led by the 42-year-old Serhiy Chaus. Although unelected, locals refer to him unofficially as the mayor. Chaus urged citizens to evacuate the city, but was sympathetic to those who stayed, saying "they don't want to leave the town where they were born".

On 9 July 2022, Russian rocket strikes on the city destroyed a railway station and partially ruined a residential building. That same day, a missile strike on a residential area killed at least 48 people.

Following the loss of Soledar on 16 January 2023 and the fall of Klishchiivka on 20 January Chasiv Yar became a pivotal center for Ukrainian defenses on the Donetsk front, as it became the only route for Ukrainian troops and supplies into and out of the besieged city of Bakhmut.

The city acted as a regrouping position, where Ukrainian troops rotated into and out of Bakhmut, giving them time to rest and resupply. Of the pre-war population of 15,000, by March 2023 only about 1,500 residents remained in the city. The remaining citizens mostly live in the basements of burnt out buildings. There are no shops anymore, and the population is reliant on outside humanitarian aid to stay alive. Most of the aid sent to the city has come from the UN's OCHA, with a large supply convoy reaching the city on 10 March 2023.

On 14 March 2023, two projectiles with white phosphorus munitions were fired on a road at the southern edge of the city. On 25 March the city was shelled resulting in a death of one civilian. By early April 2023, only a few hundred civilians remained in the city.

On 7 May 2023, Russia made an unsuccessful ground assault on Ukrainian positions in the settlement. Subsequent attacks on 8, 9 and 10 May were also repelled. On 9 May, Arman Soldin, a French war correspondent for Agence France-Presse was killed by a Russian rocket strike in Chasiv Yar, becoming the 15th journalist to have been killed by Russian forces.

After Russian forces captured all significant areas of Bakhmut, Chasiv Yar became a fortified forward artillery base, supporting Ukrainian forces in their flanking attacks, and shelling Russian forces within Bakhmut proper. As of August 2023, there were slightly over 1,000 civilians living in the remains of Chasiv Yar, who became less reliant on humanitarian aid as spring and summer allowed them to maintain gardens for produce. The Governor of Donetsk Oblast, Pavlo Kyrylenko, reported that the city was hit by a Russian cluster munition strike on 23 July.

On 10 September, a car containing four foreign aid workers for Road to Relief, a Spain-based NGO that supports civilians in the Donbas, was shelled by Russian forces. Road to Relief's Needs Assessment team's job was to visit the front line and determine where to allocate resources. The organization's director, the Spaniard Emma Igual, and Canadian Anthony Ignat were killed, while Swedish volunteer Johan Thyr and German volunteer Ruben Mawick were evacuated to a hospital where their condition stabilized.

==== Battle of Chasiv Yar ====
Ruins of the city in August 2024

Russian forces first began their offensives towards Chasiv Yar on 26 December 2023 After the fall of Bakhmut on May 20, 2023. Russia resumed ground offensives towards Chasiv Yar starting on 3 January 2024, according to the newly promoted Commander-in-Chief of the Armed Forces of Ukraine, Oleksandr Syrskyi. Syrskyi reported that Russian forces performed a major offensive north of the city, near the village of Bohdanivka. Of the city's remaining 800, mostly elderly residents, almost all stated they would evacuate with Ukrainian forces if the settlement were lost to Russian forces.

The battle would officially begin with the first direct Russian assault on Chasiv Yar on 4 April 2024. As of 24 May 2024 Russian forces had reached within 1.5 kilometers of Chasiv Yar. It was noted that the Ukrainian forces were fiercely entrenched. A Dutch international legion volunteer was killed in the city on 20 May 2024.

On 3 July 2024, ISW noted that both Russian and Ukrainian sources claim that the Kanal microdistrict of Chasiv Yar was captured by the Russian Armed Forces. Geolocated footage confirmed by the ISW indicated this information is correct, resulting in the Kanal Microdistrict of Chasiv Yar being marked as under Russian control. The Russian Ministry of Defense claimed the same day that their forces had fully captured the Novyi microdistrict as well. In mid-January 2025, the refractory plant was captured by Russian forces. The Moscow Times reported on 29 January, citing five European and Ukrainian military sources, that Chasiv Yar had come under Russian control, with Ukrainian forces being pushed to the outskirts of the city. As of early February, 90% of Chasiv Yar was occupied by Russian forces. Ukraine Armed Forces controlled part of Chasiv Yar, according to various Ukrainian military and government sources.

By the end of July, Russia claims to have taken full control of the city. Russian news agency TASS reported that Ukraine withdrew its forces to build defense at Kostiantynivka.

== Economy ==
Prior to 2022 and the destruction of the war that followed, Chasiv Yar's economy was built around the mining of refractory clays and production of refractory products. The Chasiv Yar Refractory Plant was located in the settlement.

=== Transport ===
There was one railway station in the city, which was destroyed on 9 July 2022 during the Russian invasion of Ukraine.

== Demographics ==
Historical population
Year	Pop.	±% p.a.
1989	19,804	—
1923	789	−5.00%
1926	1,064	+10.48%
1939	24,213	+27.17%
1959	23,330	−0.19%
1970	23,818	+0.19%
1979	21,825	−0.97%
1989	19,804	−0.97%
1992	19,700	−0.18%
1998	18,100	−1.40%
2001	16,612	−2.82%
2003	16,272	−1.03%
2004	15,848	−2.61%
2005	15,556	−1.84%
2006	15,367	−1.21%
2007	15,125	−1.57%
2008	14,917	−1.38%
2009	14,731	−1.25%
2010	14,541	−1.29%
2011	14,360	−1.24%
2012	14,225	−0.94%
2013	13,999	−1.59%
2014	13,817	−1.30%
2015	13,721	−0.69%
2016	13,522	−1.45%
2017	13,302	−1.63%
2018	13,113	−1.42%
2019	12,928	−1.41%
2020	12,756	−1.33%
2021	12,557	−1.56%
2022	12,250	−2.44%
2023	1,000	−91.84%
2024	496	−50.40%

Ethnic makeup of Chasiv Yar as of 2001:

Ethnic groups in Chasiv Yar
	percent
Ukrainians	73.13%
Russians	24.47%
Belarusians	0.50%
Armenians	0.23%
Tatars	0.23%

Native language as of the 2001 Ukrainian census:

Native languages in Chasiv Yar
	percent
Ukrainian	52.4%
Russian	46.6%
Armenian	0.2%
Belarusian	0.1%
Romanian	0.1%
Romani	0.1%

== Notable people ==
- Joseph Kobzon (1937–2018), Soviet crooner who has been called "the official voice of the Soviet Union", was born in Chasiv Yar
- Viktor Hahin (1934–2016), writer and local historian
- Anatoly Shamshur (1924–1943), Red Army sergeant and Hero of the Soviet Union
