= Yakovlivka, Bakhmut Raion, Donetsk Oblast =

Yakovlivka Яковлівка
- Village
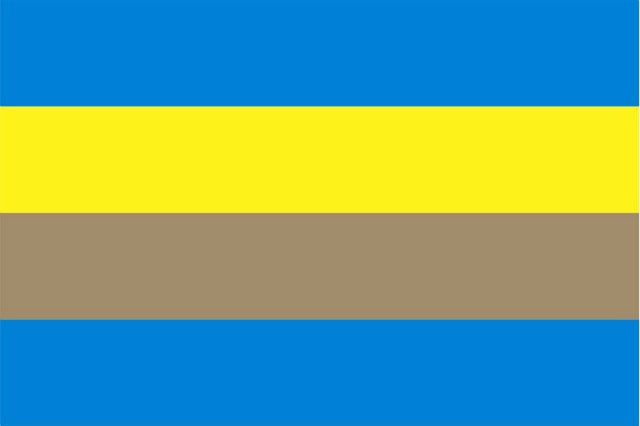
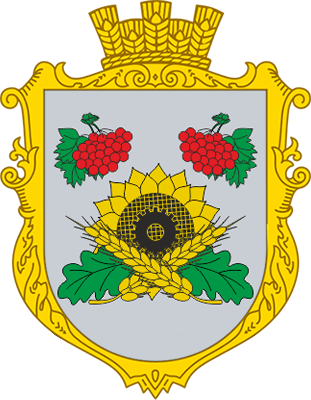
- Flag Coat of arms

- Location within Donetsk Oblast Location within Ukraine
- Coordinates: 48°42′53″N 38°8′43″E
- Country: Ukraine
- Oblast: Donetsk Oblast
- Raion: Bakhmut Raion
- Hromada: Soledar urban hromada
- Elevation: 138 m (453 ft)

Population
  - Total: 1,330
- Postal code: 84542
- Area code: +380-6274

Yakovlivka (Ukrainian: Яковлівка) is a village located in Bakhmut Raion of Donetsk Oblast, Ukraine. It is located 14 kilometres (8.7 mi) northeast of Bakhmut.

== History ==
30 homes were destroyed and three people killed by airstrikes in Yakovlika in the 2022 Russian invasion of Ukraine.

The village was reportedly captured by PMC Wagner mercenaries on December 16, 2022.

On 6 September 2023, during the Russian invasion of Ukraine, it was reported that the Ukrainian military was engaging in operations near the village.

== See also ==
- List of villages in Donetsk Oblast
