= Blahodatne, Bakhmut Raion, Donetsk Oblast =

Blahodatne Благодатне
- Village
- Location within Donetsk Oblast Location within Ukraine
- Coordinates: 48°41′33″N 38°00′48″E
- Country: Ukraine
- Oblast: Donetsk Oblast
- Raion: Bakhmut Raion
- Hromada: Soledar urban hromada
- Elevation: 78 m (256 ft)

Population
  - Total: 137
- Postal code: 84536
- Area code: +380-6274

Blahodatne (Ukrainian: Благодатне; Russian: Благодатное, romanized: Blagodatnoye) is a village located in Bakhmut Raion of Donetsk Oblast, Ukraine. It is located 5 kilometres (3.1 mi) north of Bakhmut.

== History ==
On 31 January 2023, during the Russian invasion of Ukraine, Russia claimed to have fully taken control of the village.

== See also ==
- List of villages in Donetsk Oblast
