= Lypivka, Bakhmut Raion, Donetsk Oblast =

Lypivka Липівка
- Village
- Location within Donetsk Oblast Location within Ukraine
- Coordinates: 48°46′54″N 37°52′5″E
- Country: Ukraine
- Oblast: Donetsk Oblast
- Raion: Bakhmut Raion
- Hromada: Soledar urban hromada
- Elevation: 176 m (577 ft)

Population
  - Total: 6
- Postal code: 84531
- Area code: +380-6274

Lypivka (Ukrainian: Липівка) is a village located in Bakhmut Raion of Donetsk Oblast, eastern Ukraine. Administratively, it is part of Soledar urban hromada, one of the hromadas of Ukraine.

== History ==
On 30 August 2023, during the Russian invasion of Ukraine, the village came under Russian shelling.

== See also ==
- List of villages in Donetsk Oblast
