= Nykyforivka, Donetsk Oblast =

Nykyforivka Никифорівка
- Village
- Location within Donetsk Oblast Location within Ukraine
- Coordinates: 48°46′10″N 37°53′47″E
- Country: Ukraine
- Oblast: Donetsk Oblast
- Raion: Bakhmut Raion
- Hromada: Soledar urban hromada
- Elevation: 114 m (374 ft)

Population
  - Total: 645
- Postal code: 84531
- Area code: +380-6274

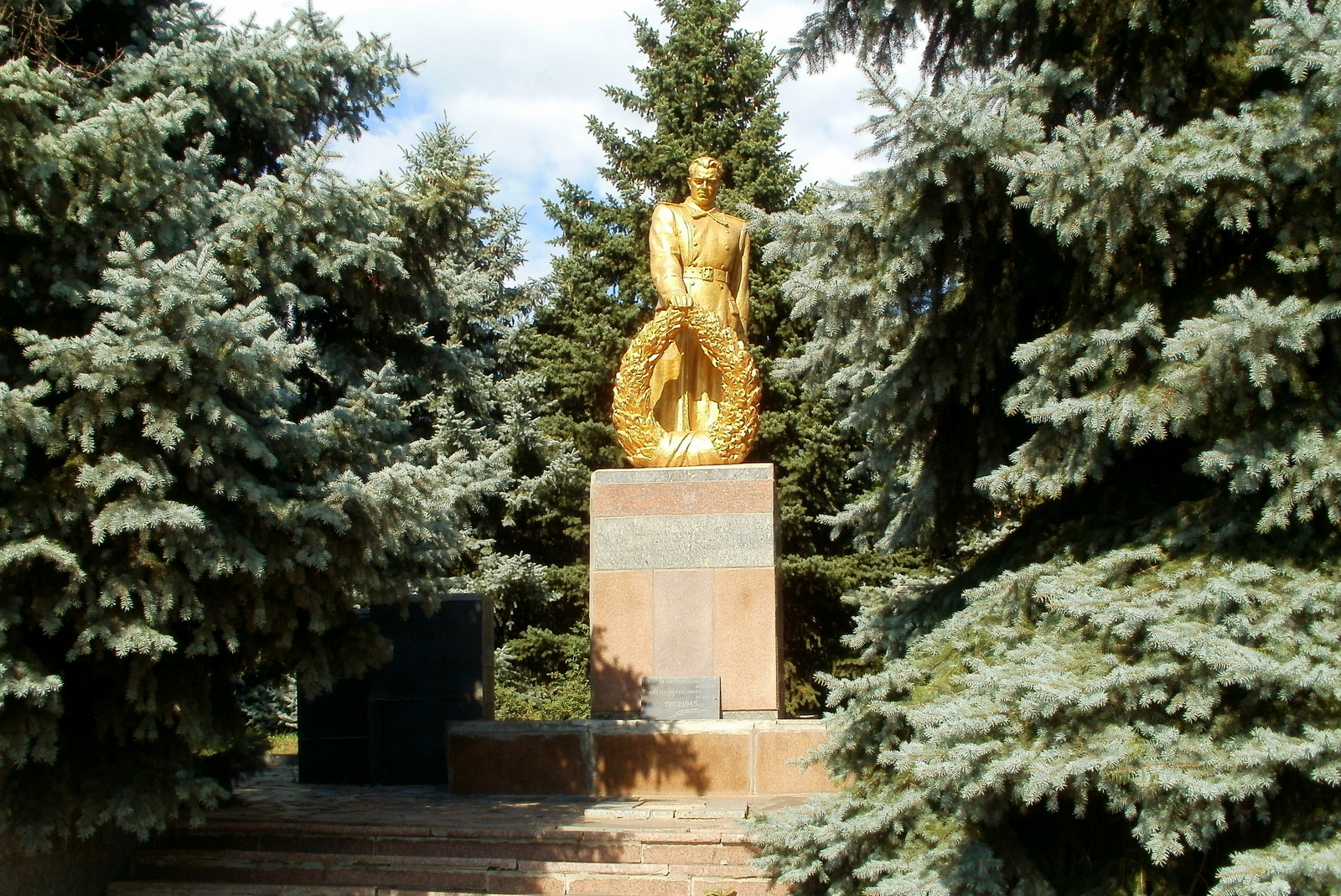
Monument for Soviet soldiers of and victims of fascism in Nikiforovka.

Nykyforivka (Ukrainian: Никифорівка) is a village located in Bakhmut Raion of Donetsk Oblast, eastern Ukraine. Administratively, it is part of Soledar urban hromada, one of the hromadas of Ukraine.

== History ==
On 2 March 2023, during the Russian invasion of Ukraine, Russian and Ukrainian forces fought in the village.

== See also ==
- List of villages in Donetsk Oblast
