= Novoselivka, Bakhmut Raion, Donetsk Oblast =

Novoselivka Новоселівка
- Village
- Location within Donetsk Oblast Location within Ukraine
- Coordinates: 48°46′57″N 38°4′42″E
- Country: Ukraine
- Oblast: Donetsk Oblast
- Raion: Bakhmut Raion
- Hromada: Zvanivka rural hromada
- Elevation: 121 m (397 ft)

Population
  - Total: 1
- Postal code: 84525
- Area code: +380-6274

Novoselivka (Ukrainian: Новоселівка) is a village located in Bakhmut Raion of Donetsk Oblast, eastern Ukraine. Administratively, it is part of Zvanivka rural hromada, one of the hromadas of Ukraine.

== History ==
During the Russian invasion of Ukraine, all children in the village were evacuated. By the end of August 2025, the village was fully captured by Russian forces.

== See also ==
- List of villages in Donetsk Oblast
