= Vasylivka, Bakhmut Raion, Donetsk Oblast =

Vasylivka Василівка
- Village
- Location within Donetsk Oblast Location within Ukraine
- Coordinates: 48°43′34″N 38°15′28″E
- Country: Ukraine
- Oblast: Donetsk Oblast
- Raion: Bakhmut Raion
- Hromada: Soledar urban hromada
- Elevation: 160 m (520 ft)

Population
  - Total: 142
- Postal code: 84542
- Area code: +380-6274

Vasylivka (Ukrainian: Василівка) is a village located in Bakhmut Raion of Donetsk Oblast, Ukraine.

== History ==
On 22 May 2022, during the Russian invasion of Ukraine, the Ukrainian military reported that fighting was ongoing in the vicinity of the village as Russian forces advanced from nearby Popasna.

== See also ==
- List of villages in Donetsk Oblast
