= Kuzmynivka, Donetsk Oblast =

Kuzmynivka Кузьминівка
- Village
- Location within Donetsk Oblast Location within Ukraine
- Coordinates: 48°47′47″N 38°4′1″E
- Country: Ukraine
- Oblast: Donetsk Oblast
- Raion: Bakhmut Raion
- Hromada: Zvanivka rural hromada
- Elevation: 78 m (256 ft)

Population
  - Total: 23
- Postal code: 84528
- Area code: +380-6274

Kuzmynivka (Ukrainian: Кузьминівка) is a village located in Bakhmut Raion of Donetsk Oblast, eastern Ukraine. Administratively, it is part of Zvanivka rural hromada, one of the hromadas of Ukraine.

== History ==
On 14 February 2024, during the Russian invasion of Ukraine, the village came under Russian airstrikes. By the end of September 2025, the village was fully captured by Russian forces.

== See also ==
- List of villages in Donetsk Oblast
