= Hryhorivka, Chasiv Yar urban hromada, Bakhmut Raion, Donetsk Oblast =

Hryhorivka Григорівка
- Village
- Interactive map of Hryhorivka
- Location within Donetsk Oblast Location within Ukraine
- Coordinates: 48°38′20″N 37°51′11″E
- Country: Ukraine
- Oblast: Donetsk Oblast
- Raion: Bakhmut Raion
- Hromada: Chasiv Yar urban hromada
- Elevation: 162 m (531 ft)

Population (2001 census)
  - Total: 92
- Postal code: 84550
- Area code: +380-6274
- KATOTTH: UA14020130030056885

Hryhorivka (Ukrainian: Григорівка) is a village located in Bakhmut Raion of Donetsk Oblast, Ukraine. It is located approximately 6 kilometres (3.7 mi) northwest of Bakhmut.

== History ==
=== Russian invasion of Ukraine ===
On 21 May 2023, during the Russian invasion of Ukraine, the Ukrainian military reported that Russian forces engaged in unsuccessful attacks towards the village. These attacks continued in the summer and autumn of 2023.

The attacks continued in the summer of 2024, with Russia claiming to have seized the village on 10 September.

== Demographics ==
As of the 2001 Ukrainian census, the settlement had 92 inhabitants, whose native languages were 91.30% Ukrainian and 7.61% Russian.

== See also ==
- List of villages in Donetsk Oblast
