= Pidhorodne, Donetsk Oblast =

Pidhorodne Підгородне
- Rural settlement
- Location within Donetsk Oblast Location within Ukraine
- Coordinates: 48°38′08″N 38°1′25″E
- Country: Ukraine
- Oblast: Donetsk Oblast
- Raion: Bakhmut Raion
- Hromada: Soledar urban hromada
- Elevation: 106 m (348 ft)

Population
  - Total: 163
- Postal code: 84546
- Area code: +380-6274

Pidhorodne (Ukrainian: Підгородне) is a rural settlement located in Bakhmut Raion of Donetsk Oblast, Ukraine. It is located 5 kilometres (3.1 mi) northeast of Bakhmut.

== History ==
From 27 to 28 November 2022, during the Russian invasion of Ukraine, Russian forces reportedly captured the settlement and neighboring villages.

== See also ==
- List of villages in Donetsk Oblast
