= Minkivka =

Minkivka Міньківка
- Village
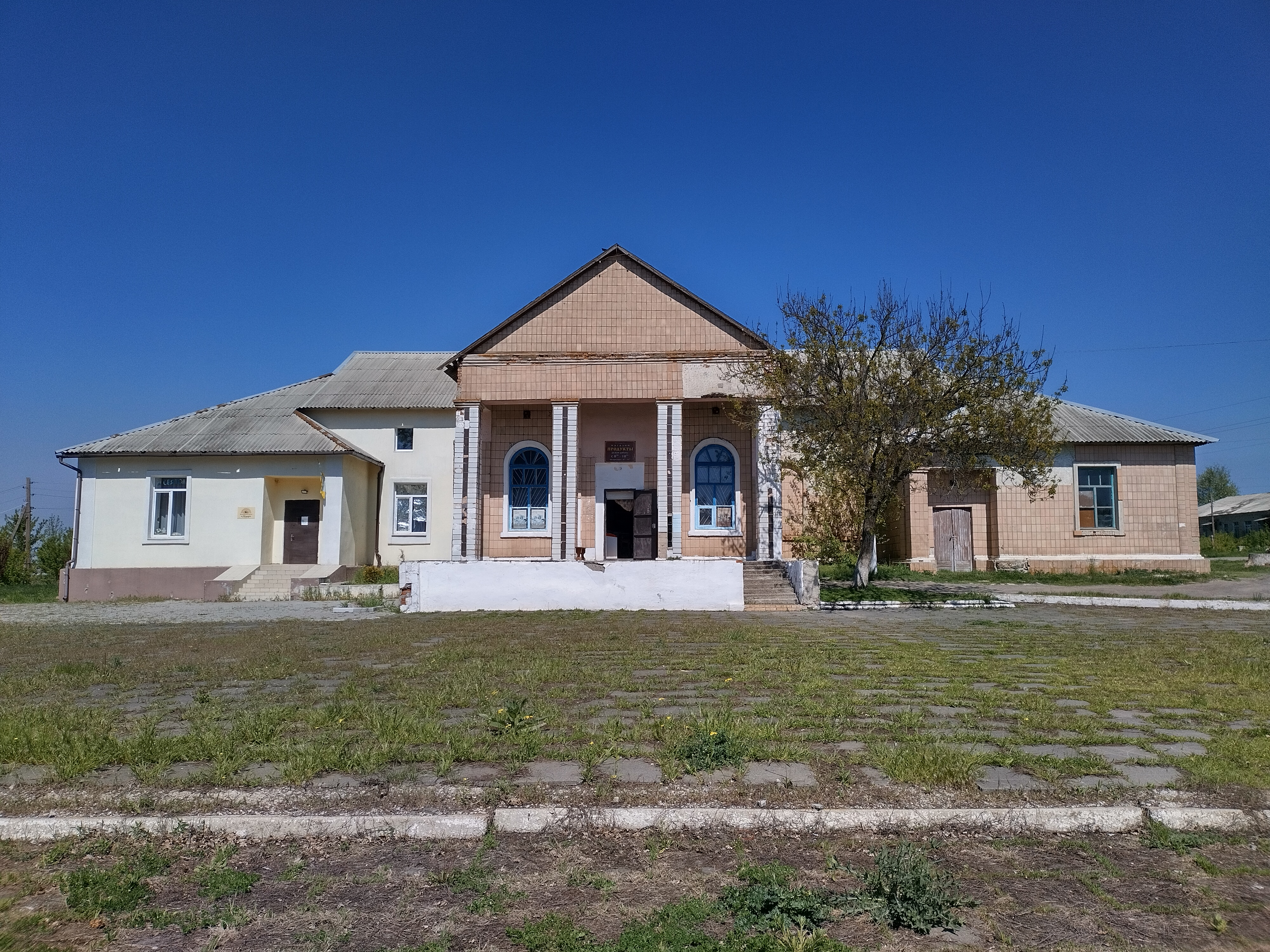
- The House of Culture in Minkivka

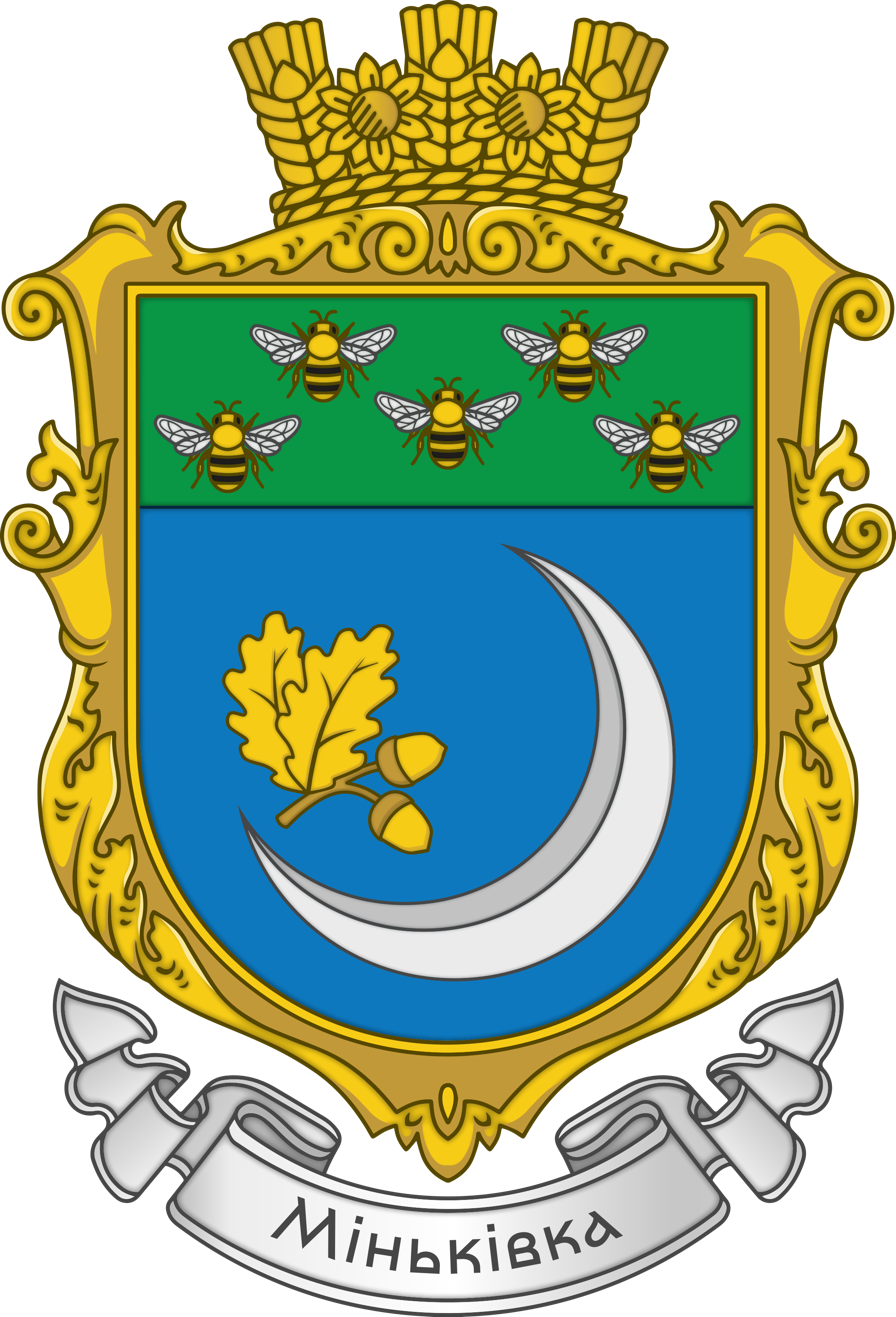
- Coat of arms

- Location within Donetsk Oblast Location within Ukraine
- Coordinates: 48°42′10″N 37°50′53″E
- Country: Ukraine
- Oblast: Donetsk Oblast
- Raion: Bakhmut Raion
- Hromada: Soledar urban hromada
- Elevation: 171 m (561 ft)

Population
  - Total: 800
- Postal code: 84532
- Area code: +380-6274

Minkivka (Ukrainian: Міньківка) is a village located in Bakhmut Raion of Donetsk Oblast, Ukraine. It is located 15 kilometres (9.3 mi) northwest of Bakhmut, on the M03 highway.

== History ==
On 5 January 2015, there was a fatal vehicle accident involving local Ukrainian military units near Minkivka, in which a bus of soldiers collided with a military truck. Vyacheslav Abroskin, head of the Donetsk Oblast branch of the Ministry of Internal Affairs reported that the cause of the crash was weather conditions: namely ice and poor visibility. 12 soldiers died and 22 were injured. Abroskin said an investigation was taking place.

On 14 March 2023, during the battle of Bakhmut of the Russian invasion of Ukraine, Minkivka was the last settlement under Ukrainian control on the M03 highway. On 26 August 2023, the Russian Ministry of Defense claimed that the Ukrainian military engaged in unsuccessful operations near the village.

During the 2026 counteroffensive, Minkivka was recaptured by the Ukrainian Armed Forces. However, the settlement was recaptured by Russia as of late April 2026.

== See also ==
- List of villages in Donetsk Oblast
