= Fedorivka Druha =

Fedorivka Druha Федорівка Друга
- Village
- Location within Donetsk Oblast Location within Ukraine
- Coordinates: 48°45′48″N 37°51′3″E
- Country: Ukraine
- Oblast: Donetsk Oblast
- Raion: Bakhmut Raion
- Hromada: Soledar urban hromada
- Elevation: 146 m (479 ft)

Population
  - Total: 84
- Postal code: 84531
- Area code: +380-6274

Fedorivka Druha (Ukrainian: Федорівка Друга) is a village located in Bakhmut Raion of Donetsk Oblast, eastern Ukraine. Administratively, it is part of Soledar urban hromada, one of the hromadas of Ukraine.

== History ==
On 5 September 2023, during the Russian invasion of Ukraine, the village came under Russian shelling.

== See also ==
- List of villages in Donetsk Oblast
