= Bilohorivka, Donetsk Oblast =

Bilohorivka Білогорівка
- Village
- Interactive map of Bilohorivka
- Location of Bilohorivka within Ukraine Bilohorivka (Ukraine)
- Coordinates: 48.733056°N 38.215556°E
- Country: Ukraine
- Oblast: Donetsk Oblast
- Raion: Bakhmut Raion
- Hromada: Soledar urban hromada
- Elevation: 132 m (433 ft)

Population (2001 census)
  - Total: 134
- Time zone: UTC+2 (EET)
  - Summer (DST): UTC+3 (EEST)
- Postal code: 84542
- Area code: +380 6274

Bilohorivka (Ukrainian: Білогорівка; Russian: Белогоровка) is a village in Bakhmut Raion, Donetsk Oblast, eastern Ukraine. It is located approximately 82 kilometres (51 mi) north-north-east from the centre of Donetsk and 46 kilometres (29 mi) east from Kramatorsk.

The village came under attack by Russian forces during the Russian invasion of Ukraine in 2022. Since November 2022, it has been occupied.

== History ==
As of 27 June 2022, according to the Ukrainian-based DeepStateMap.Live, the eastern end of Bilohorivka (east of the main highway) was occupied by Russian forces.

On 30 November 2022, the Russian Armed Forces re-captured the village.
