= Striapivka =

Striapivka Стряпівка
- Village
- Location within Donetsk Oblast Location within Ukraine
- Coordinates: 48°40′17″N 38°9′20″E
- Country: Ukraine
- Oblast: Donetsk Oblast
- Raion: Bakhmut Raion
- Hromada: Soledar urban hromada
- Elevation: 94 m (308 ft)

Population
  - Total: 50
- Postal code: 84560
- Area code: +380-6274

Striapivka (Ukrainian: Стряпівка) is a village located in Bakhmut Raion of Donetsk Oblast, Ukraine. It is located southeast of Bakhmut.

== History ==
On 28 July 2022, during the Russian invasion of Ukraine, it was reported that Russian forces attempted to take control of the village. Russian sources claimed that the village was captured on 9 August.

== See also ==
- List of villages in Donetsk Oblast
