= Rozdolivka, Donetsk Oblast =

Rozdolivka Роздолівка
- Village
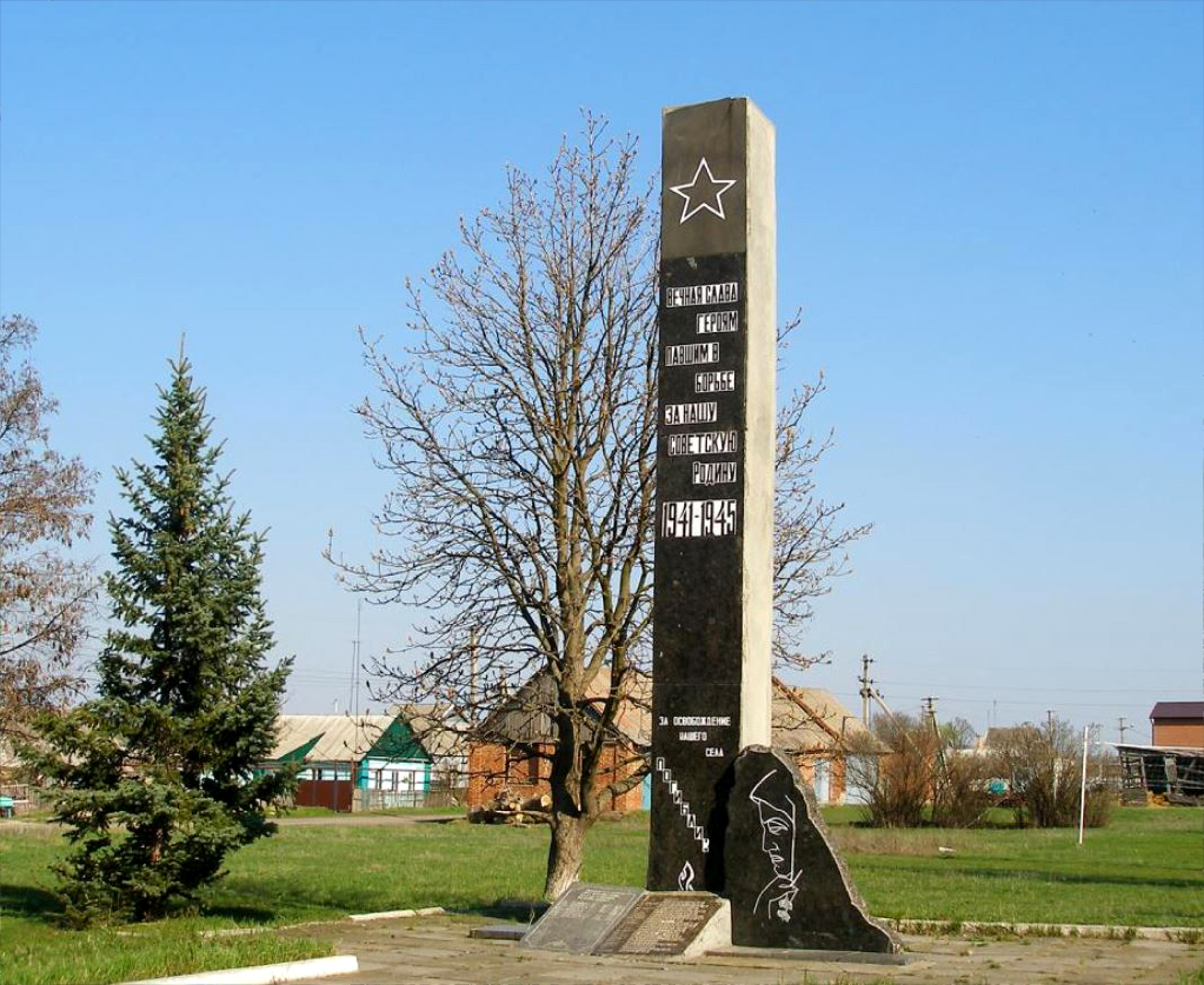
- WWII Memorial in Rozdolivka

- Location within Donetsk Oblast Location within Ukraine
- Coordinates: 48°45′18″N 38°5′11″E
- Country: Ukraine
- Oblast: Donetsk Oblast
- Raion: Bakhmut Raion
- Hromada: Soledar urban hromada
- Elevation: 76 m (249 ft)

Population
  - Total: 740
- Postal code: 84540
- Area code: +380-6274

Rozdolivka (Ukrainian: Роздолівка) is a village located in Bakhmut Raion of Donetsk Oblast, Ukraine. It is located 19 kilometres (12 mi) northeast of Bakhmut.

== History ==
On 11 July 2023, during the Russian invasion of Ukraine, a Russian source reported that the Ukrainian military engaged in operations near the village.

On June 28, 2024, the Russian Ministry of Defence claimed that it took military control of the village.

== See also ==
- List of villages in Donetsk Oblast
