= Zvanivka =

Village in Donetsk Oblast, Ukraine

Zvanivka Званівка
- Village
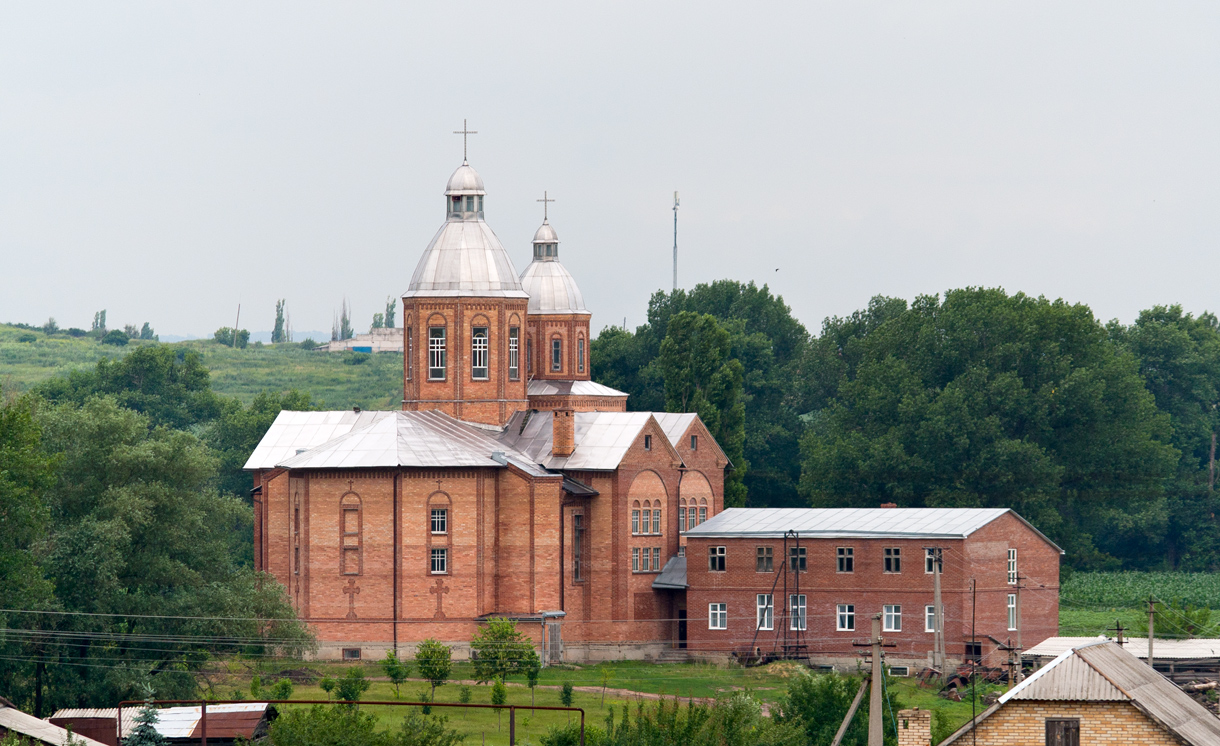
- The Catholic monastery in Zvanivka

- Location within Donetsk Oblast Location within Ukraine
- Coordinates: 48°48′42″N 38°5′8″E
- Country: Ukraine
- Oblast: Donetsk Oblast
- Raion: Bakhmut Raion
- Hromada: Zvanivka rural hromada
- Elevation: 71 m (233 ft)

Population
  - Total: 1,345

Zvanivka (Ukrainian: Званівка) is a village in eastern Ukraine, located in Bakhmut Raion, Donetsk Oblast. Zvanivka hosts the administration of the Zvanivka rural hromada, one of the hromadas of Ukraine.

== Climate ==
Zvanivka has a cold and temperate climate, and receives significant rainfall.

Climate data for Zvanivka
Month	Jan	Feb	Mar	Apr	May	Jun	Jul	Aug	Sep	Oct	Nov	Dec	Year
Mean maximum °C	−1.6	−0.1	6.2	14.7	21.4	25.5	27.9	27.7	20.9	12.8	5.3	0.7	27.9
Daily mean °C	−4.1	−3.2	2.1	9.9	16.5	20.7	23.2	22.6	16.3	9.0	2.7	−1.5	9.5
Mean minimum °C	−6.8	−6.4	−2.1	4.5	10.6	15.2	17.7	17.1	11.7	5.3	0.1	−3.7	−6.8
Average precipitation mm	50	39	46	50	54	62	54	37	49	44	44	50	579
Daily mean °F	24.6	26.2	35.8	49.8	61.7	69.3	73.8	72.7	61.3	48.2	36.9	29.3	49.1
Average precipitation inches	2.0	1.5	1.8	2.0	2.1	2.4	2.1	1.5	1.9	1.7	1.7	2.0	22.7

== Archeology ==
In 1969, an ancient settlement from the Mousterian culture from the Paleolithic Age was discovered at the site of Zvanivka.

== History ==
In 1859, Zvanivka was noted as being a manor village with a population of 136 people and an Orthodox church.

=== Soviet era ===
As a result of the Holodomor, 108 residents of Zvanivka died.

In 1951, Boykos were resettled in Zvanivka — these were formerly residents of the villages of Liskowate and Moczary, the territories of which were transferred to Poland as part of the 1951 Polish-Soviet territorial exchange.

=== 21st century ===
In 2023, during the Russian invasion of Ukraine, Zvanivka came under Russian shelling.

== Demographics ==
Historical population
Year	Pop.	±% p.a.
1859	136	—
1970	1,084	+1.89%
2001	1,430	+0.90%
2017	1,345	−0.38%

A significant amount of the population are families of displaced Lemkos and Boykos.

=== Census data ===
As of the 2001 Ukrainian census, Zvanivka had a population of 1,430 inhabitants, which is almost entirely ethnically Ukrainian. The linguistic composition of the population was as follows:

Native languages in Zvanivka
	percent
Ukrainian	93.8%
Russian	5.8%
Armenian	0.3%
Belarusian	0.1%
others	0.0%

== Religion ==
A monastery of the Order of Saint Basil the Great of the Ukrainian Greek Catholic Church operates in the village. The monastery was founded on July 27, 1998.

In 2018 and 2019, Zvanivka hosted a regional festival of nativity scenes and Christmas carols.
