= Holubivka, Bakhmut Raion, Donetsk Oblast =

Holubivka Голубівка
- Village
- Location within Donetsk Oblast Location within Ukraine
- Coordinates: 48°43′0″N 37°50′59″E
- Country: Ukraine
- Oblast: Donetsk Oblast
- Raion: Bakhmut Raion
- Hromada: Soledar urban hromada
- Elevation: 153 m (502 ft)

Population (2020)
  - Total: 25
- Postal code: 84532
- Area code: +380-6274

Holubivka (Ukrainian: Голубівка) is a village located in Bakhmut Raion of Donetsk Oblast, eastern Ukraine. Administratively, it is part of Soledar urban hromada, one of the hromadas of Ukraine.

== History ==
In 2023, during the Russian invasion of Ukraine, Ukrainian authorities evacuated all remaining children residing in the village.

== See also ==
- List of villages in Donetsk Oblast
