= Bakhmutske =

Village in Donetsk Oblast, Ukraine

Bakhmutske Бахмутське
- Village
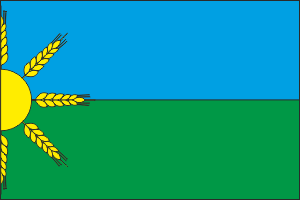
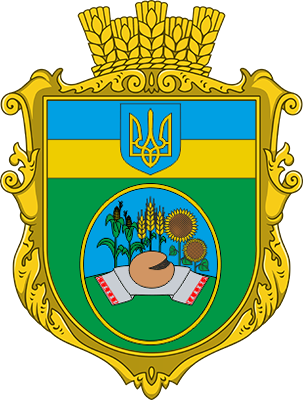
- Flag Coat of arms
- Interactive map of Bakhmutske
- Location of Bakhmutske within Ukraine Bakhmutske (Ukraine)
- Coordinates: 48.660278°N 38.099722°E
- Country: Ukraine
- Oblast: Donetsk Oblast
- Raion: Bakhmut Raion
- Hromada: Soledar urban hromada

Area
  - Total: 2.932 km^{2} (1.132 sq mi)
- Elevation: 94 m (308 ft)

Population (2001 census)
  - Total: 784
  - Density: 267/km^{2} (693/sq mi)
- Time zone: UTC+2 (EET)
  - Summer (DST): UTC+3 (EEST)
- Postal code: 84546
- Area code: +380 6274
- KATOTTH: UA14020090020089360

Bakhmutske (Ukrainian: Бахмутське; Russian: Бахмутское, romanized: Bakhmutskoye) is a village in Bakhmut Raion (district) in Donetsk Oblast, eastern Ukraine, located about 83.3 kilometres (51.8 mi) north-northeast from the centre of the city of Donetsk. It belongs to Soledar urban hromada, one of the hromadas of Ukraine. It has been occupied by Russia since December 2022.

The village came under attack by Russian forces in 2022, during the Russian invasion of Ukraine. Ukrainian forces were reportedly pushed out of much of the village during a local Russian offensive against Soledar on 26 December. Bakhmutske was effectively captured by Russian forces on 27 December.
