= Krasnopolivka =

Krasnopolivka Краснополівка
- Village
- Location within Donetsk Oblast Location within Ukraine
- Coordinates: 48°43′53″N 38°2′50″E
- Country: Ukraine
- Oblast: Donetsk Oblast
- Raion: Bakhmut Raion
- Hromada: Soledar urban hromada
- Elevation: 79 m (259 ft)

Population
  - Total: 33
- Postal code: 84540
- Area code: +380-6274

Krasnopolivka (Ukrainian: Краснополівка) is a village located in Bakhmut Raion of Donetsk Oblast, Ukraine. It is located 12 kilometres (7.5 mi) northeast of Bakhmut.

== History ==
On 19 June 2023, during the Russian invasion of Ukraine, a Russian source reported that the Ukrainian military advanced towards the village.

== See also ==
- List of villages in Donetsk Oblast
