= Khromivka =

Khromivka Хромівка
- Village
- Location within Donetsk Oblast Location within Ukraine
- Coordinates: 48°44′46″N 37°56′30″E
- Country: Ukraine
- Oblast: Donetsk Oblast
- Raion: Bakhmut Raion
- Hromada: Soledar urban hromada
- Elevation: 95 m (312 ft)

Population
  - Total: 34
- Postal code: 84530
- Area code: +380-6274

Khromivka (Ukrainian: Хромівка) is a village located in Bakhmut Raion of Donetsk Oblast, eastern Ukraine. Administratively, it is part of Soledar urban hromada, one of the hromadas of Ukraine.

== History ==
In 2023, during the Russian invasion of Ukraine, there was tense fighting close to the village.

== See also ==
- List of villages in Donetsk Oblast
