= Vasiukivka, Donetsk Oblast =

Vasiukivka Васюківка
- Village
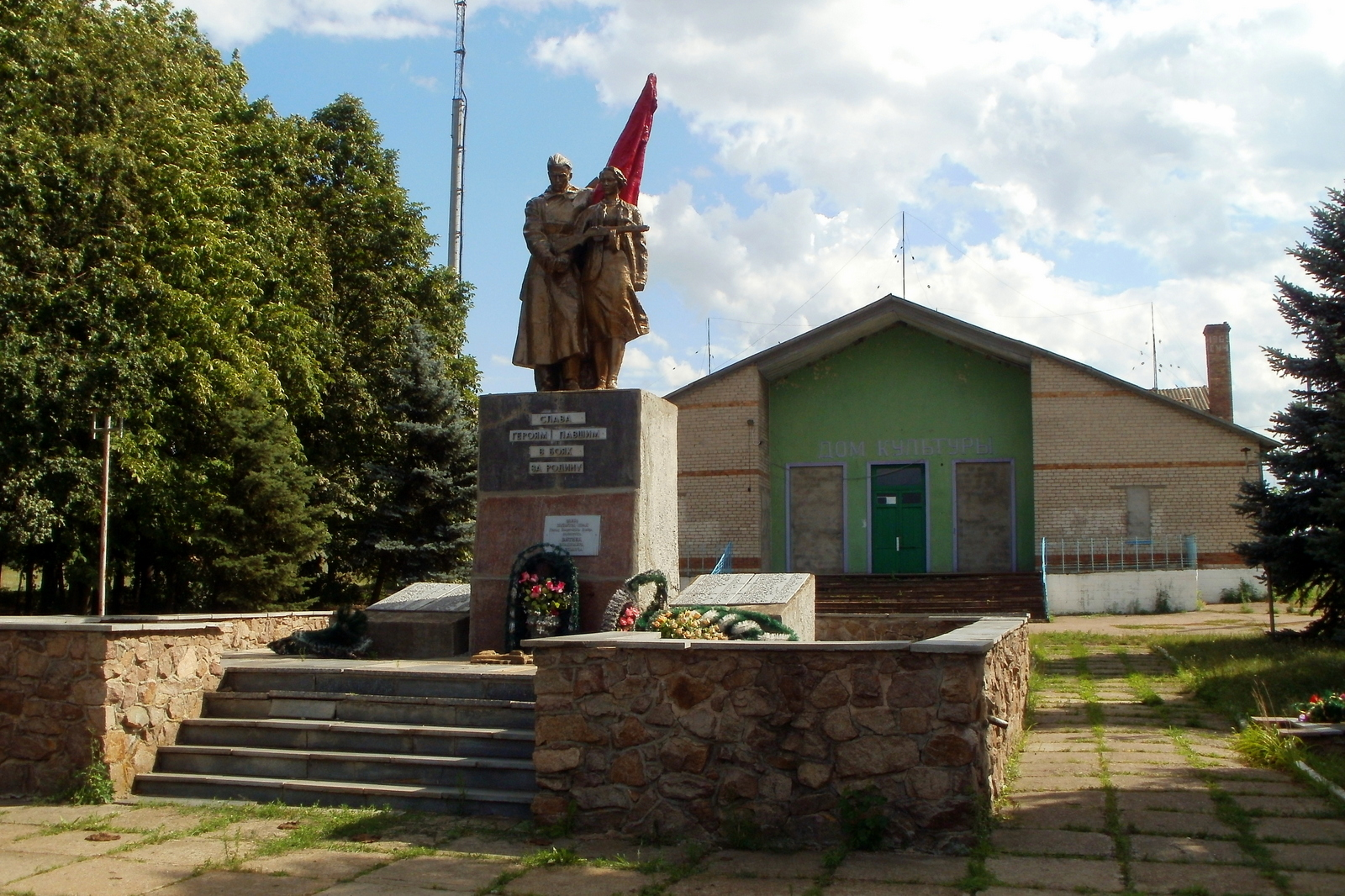
- World War II Monument in the village.

- Location within Donetsk Oblast Location within Ukraine
- Coordinates: 48°44′34″N 37°59′20″E
- Country: Ukraine
- Oblast: Donetsk Oblast
- Raion: Bakhmut Raion
- Hromada: Soledar urban hromada
- Elevation: 79 m (259 ft)

Population (2001)
  - Total: 601
- Postal code: 84530
- Area code: +380-6274

Vasiukivka (Ukrainian: Васюківка) is a village located in Bakhmut Raion of Donetsk Oblast, Ukraine. It is located north of Bakhmut.

== History ==
On 4 March 2023, during the Russian invasion of Ukraine, the Ukrainian military reported that there were hostilities in the village as Russian forces attempted to capture Bakhmut. On 27 November 2025, the village came under full control of the Russian forces.

== See also ==
- List of villages in Donetsk Oblast
