= Zvanivka rural hromada =

Zvanivka rural hromada Званівська селищна громада
- Hromada
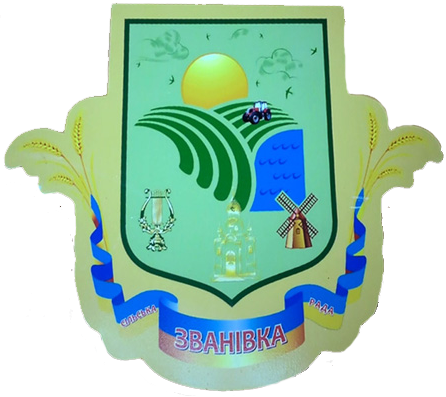
- Coat of arms
- Interactive map of Zvanivka rural hromada
- Country: Ukraine
- Oblast: Donetsk
- Raion: Bakhmut

Government
  - Head: Sofia Mykolayivna Maksymenko

Area
  - Total: 115.5 km^{2} (44.6 sq mi)

Population (2020)
  - Total: 2,418
  - Density: 20.94/km^{2} (54.22/sq mi)
- Settlements: 6
- Villages: 6

Zvanivka rural hromada (Ukrainian: Званівська селищна громада) is a hromada of Ukraine, located in Bakhmut Raion, Donetsk Oblast. Its administrative center is the village of Zvanivka.

It has an area of 115.5 square kilometres (44.6 mi^{2}) and a population of 2,418, as of 2020.

The hromada contains 6 settlements, which are all villages:

- Verkhniokamianske
- Zvanivka
- Ivano-Daryivka
- Kuzmynivka
- Novoselivka
- Pereizne

== Demographics ==
As of the 2001 Ukrainian census, the subdivision had a population of 3,303 inhabitants. The linguistic composition was as follows:

Native languages (2001)
	percent
Ukrainian	92.9%
Russian	6.7%
Armenian	0.2%
Belarusian	0.1%
others	0.1%

== See also ==
- List of hromadas of Ukraine
