= Andrii Skibin =

Ukrainian soldier in aerial reconnaissance

- Андрій Скібін
- Born: Andrii Serhiiovych Skibin
- Military career
- Allegiance: Ukraine
- Branch: Armed Forces of Ukraine
- Rank: Junior lieutenant
- Nickname: Skyba (Скиба)
- Unit: 10th Mountain Assault Brigade
- Conflicts: Russo-Ukrainian War
- Awards: Order for Courage

Andrii Serhiiovych Skibin (Ukrainian: Андрій Сергійович Скібін) is a junior lieutenant of the 10th Mountain Assault Brigade of the Armed Forces of Ukraine. His significant contributions to aerial reconnaissance during the Russo-Ukrainian war were highlighted by President Volodymyr Zelenskyy in his TV address to the nation.

== Biography ==
Skinin has been in the Armed Forces of Ukraine since 2018. On 1 April 2019, he signed a contract with the 10th mountain assault brigade, where he commands an unmanned aerial vehicle unit of the reconnaissance platoon of the 108th mountain assault battalion.

During the Russia's invasion of Ukraine, aerial reconnaissance officer Andrii Skibin used drones to stop multiple enemy assaults, eliminated about 500 Russian occupants, and blew up a car with the commander of an enemy brigade, Denys Ivanov ("Tashkent").

On 10 August 2023, President of Ukraine Volodymyr Zelenskyi mentioned Junior Lieutenant Andrii Skibin and his contributions in a televised address to the nation.

== Awards ==
- Order for Courage, 3rd class (23 November 2022)

== Military ranks ==
- Junior lieutenant
- Junior sergeant
