= Vasyl Zubanych =

Ukrainian brigadier general (born 1983)

Vasyl Ivanovych Zubanych
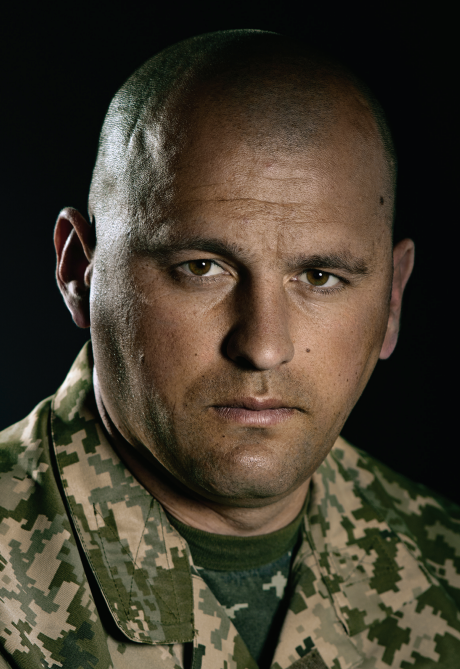
- Native name: Василь Іванович Зубанич
- Born: 9 February 1983 (age 43); Holyatyn, Zakarpattia Oblast, Ukrainian SSR, Soviet Union
- Allegiance: Ukraine
- Branch: Ukrainian Ground Forces
- Service years: 2000–present
- Rank: Brigadier general
- Commands: 10th Mountain Brigade
- Conflicts: Russo-Ukrainian War; War in Donbas; Battle of Debaltseve
- Awards: Medal For Military Service to Ukraine

Vasyl Ivanovych Zubanych (Ukrainian: Василь Іванович Зубанич; born 9 February 1983) is a brigadier general in the Ukrainian Ground Forces and a Hero of Ukraine. Zubanych was awarded the title Hero of Ukraine for his leadership of 15th Separate Mountain Battalion of the 128th Mountain Brigade in the fighting for Luhansk International Airport and the Battle of Debaltseve. In late 2015, he became the commander of the 10th Mountain Brigade.

== Early life ==
Zubanych was born on 9 February 1983 in the village of Holyatyn in Zakarpattia Oblast.

== Military service ==
Zubanych joined the Ukrainian Ground Forces in 2000 and graduated from the Odesa Institute of Land Forces. He was initially posted to the 24th Mechanized Brigade.

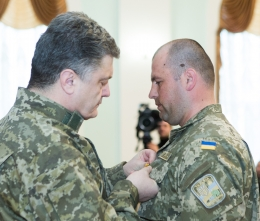
Zubanych (right) receives the Gold Star of a Hero of Ukraine from Poroshenko

Zubanych became a company commander in the 15th Separate Mountain Battalion of the 128th Mechanized Brigade. On 6 December 2012, Zubanych was awarded the Medal For Military Service to Ukraine. He later became battalion chief of staff. He became commander of the battalion on 31 December 2013. From May 2014, he fought in the War in Donbass. Zubanych fought in battles in Novoannovku, Nyzhne Teple, Luhansk village, Makarove, and Shchastia. He served at mobile checkpoints, escorting supplies and convoys. Zubanych's positions were repeatedly shelled and attacked by separatists. While leading an assault group at the Luhansk Airport to cover the retreat of Ukrainian troops from an encirclement, Zubanych was wounded by shrapnel and also shot but continued to lead the unit and refused hospitalization. In November 2014, he fought in the Battle of Debaltseve. His battalion held Chornukhyne, Nikishynomu, Ridkodubi, Kamyantsi, and other points in the Debaltseve salient despite significant losses. The battalion was constantly under fire from BM-27 Uragans, BM-21 Grads, artillery, and mortars. On 23 March 2015, Zubanych was awarded the title Hero of Ukraine for his leadership.

In September 2015, Zubanych became the commander of the newly formed 10th Mountain Brigade in Kolomyia. The Luhansk People's Republic accused Zubanych of war crimes in January 2016.

== Personal life ==
Zubanych is married.

== Awards ==
- Hero of Ukraine with the Order of the Golden Star (March 23, 2015)
- Medal For Military Service to Ukraine (December 6, 2012)
