= Bohdanivka, Bakhmut Raion, Donetsk Oblast =

Bohdanivka Богданівка
- Village
- Location within Donetsk Oblast Location within Ukraine
- Coordinates: 48°37′04″N 37°53′44″E
- Country: Ukraine
- Oblast: Donetsk Oblast
- Raion: Bakhmut Raion
- Hromada: Chasiv Yar urban hromada
- Elevation: 129 m (423 ft)

Population (2014)
  - Total: ▼77
- Postal code: 84550
- Area code: +380-6274

Bohdanivka (Ukrainian: Богданівка, Russian: Богдановка, romanized: Bogdanovka), is a village located in Bakhmut Raion of Donetsk Oblast, Ukraine. It is located 5 kilometres (3.1 mi) northwest of Bakhmut.

== History ==
=== Russo-Ukrainian War ===
On 17 May 2023, during the Russo-Ukrainian war, it was reported that the Ukrainian military was engaging in operations near the village.

Starting in late January 2024, Russian forces had made Bohdanivka the focus of their "Bakhmut axis" launching a major offensive on the settlement. These attacks consisted of small groups with FPV drones as reconnaissance, with no use of heavy weapons, such as tanks, armored personnel carriers or artillery.

After months of clashes, DeepStateMap.Live reported that Russian forces captured Bohdanivka by 13 April 2024. The Russian Ministry of Defence formally announced control of the village on 21 April 2024.

== Demographics ==
Native languages according to the 2001 Ukrainian census:

Native languages in Bohdanivka
	percent
Ukrainian	71.1%
Russian	28.9%

== See also ==
- List of villages in Donetsk Oblast
