= Soledar urban hromada =

Soledar urban hromada Соледарська міська громада
- Hromada
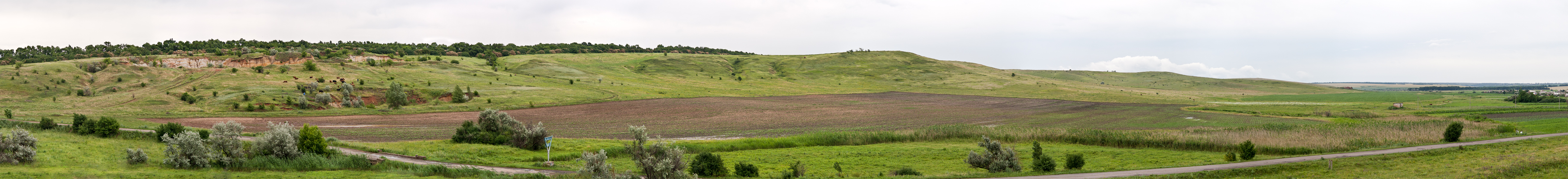
- Countryside of Soledar Hromada
- Interactive map of Soledar urban hromada
- Country: Ukraine
- Oblast: Donetsk
- Raion: Bakhmut

Area
  - Total: 558.29 km^{2} (215.56 sq mi)

Population (2018)
  - Total: 20,581
  - Density: 36.864/km^{2} (95.478/sq mi)
- Settlements: 37
- Cities: 1
- Rural settlements: 4
- Villages: 32

Soledar urban hromada (Ukrainian: Соледарська міська громада, romanized: Soledarska miska hromada) is a hromada of Ukraine, located in Bakhmut Raion, Donetsk Oblast. Its administrative center is the city Soledar.

It has an area of 558.29 square kilometres (215.56 mi^{2}) and a population of 20,581, as of 2018.

It was formed on 15 September 2016 by merging local city and village councils in Bakhmut Raion.

The hromada includes 37 settlements: 1 city (Soledar), 32 villages:

- Bakhmutske
- Berestove
- Bilohorivka
- Blahodatne
- Bondarne, Bakhmut Raion
- Vasylivka
- Vasiukivka
- Vesele
- Volodymyrivka
- Holubivka
- Dibrova, Bakhmut Raion
- Dubovo-Vasylivka
- Zaliznianske
- Krasnopolivka
- Lypivka, Bakhmut Raion, Donetsk Oblast
- Lypove
- Mykolaivka
- Minkivka
- Nykyforivka, Donetsk Oblast
- Orikhovo-Vasylivka
- Pazeno
- Paraskoviivka
- Pylypchatyne
- Pryvillia
- Rozdolivka
- Sakko i Vantsetti
- Striapivka
- Trypillia
- Fedorivka
- Fedorivka Druha
- Khromivka
- Yakovlivka

And 4 rural-type settlements: Vyimka, Nahirne, Pidhorodne, and Spirne.

== See also ==
- List of hromadas of Ukraine
