= Vyimka =

Vyimka Виїмка
- Rural settlement
- Location within Donetsk Oblast Location within Ukraine
- Coordinates: 48°48′18″N 38°9′8″E
- Country: Ukraine
- Oblast: Donetsk Oblast
- Raion: Bakhmut Raion
- Hromada: Soledar urban hromada
- Elevation: 91 m (299 ft)

Population (2001)
  - Total: 21
- Postal code: 84541
- Area code: +380-6274

Vyimka (Ukrainian: Виїмка) is a rural settlement in Bakhmut Raion, Donetsk Oblast, Ukraine. It is located 22 kilometres (14 mi) northeast of Bakhmut.

== History ==
On 20 February 2023, during the Russian invasion of Ukraine, it was reported that the Ukrainian military repelled advances towards the settlement by Russian forces.
