= Ivano-Darivka =

Ivano-Darivka Івано-Дар'ївка
- Village
- Location within Donetsk Oblast Location within Ukraine
- Coordinates: 48°48′53″N 38°12′3″E
- Country: Ukraine
- Oblast: Donetsk Oblast
- Raion: Bakhmut Raion
- Hromada: Zvanivka rural hromada
- Elevation: 118 m (387 ft)

Population
  - Total: 23
- Postal code: 84525
- Area code: +380-6274

Ivano-Darivka (Ukrainian: Івано-Дар'ївка) is a village located in Zvanivka rural hromada, Bakhmut Raion of Donetsk Oblast, eastern Ukraine.

== History ==
=== Russo-Ukrainian War ===
==== Russian invasion of Ukraine ====
In August 2023, during the Russian invasion of Ukraine, Russian forces conducted a military offensive towards the village. The village was captured around 17 July 2024. On 28 August 2024, multiple sources indicated Ukrainian advances in the village, with some sources showing the village in a contested gray zone, with neither Russian nor Ukrainian forces having full control of the village. On 30 July 2025, the village was recaptured by Russian forces.

== See also ==
- List of villages in Donetsk Oblast
