= Berestove, Bakhmut Raion, Donetsk Oblast =

Village in Donetsk Oblast, Ukraine

Berestove Берестове
- Village
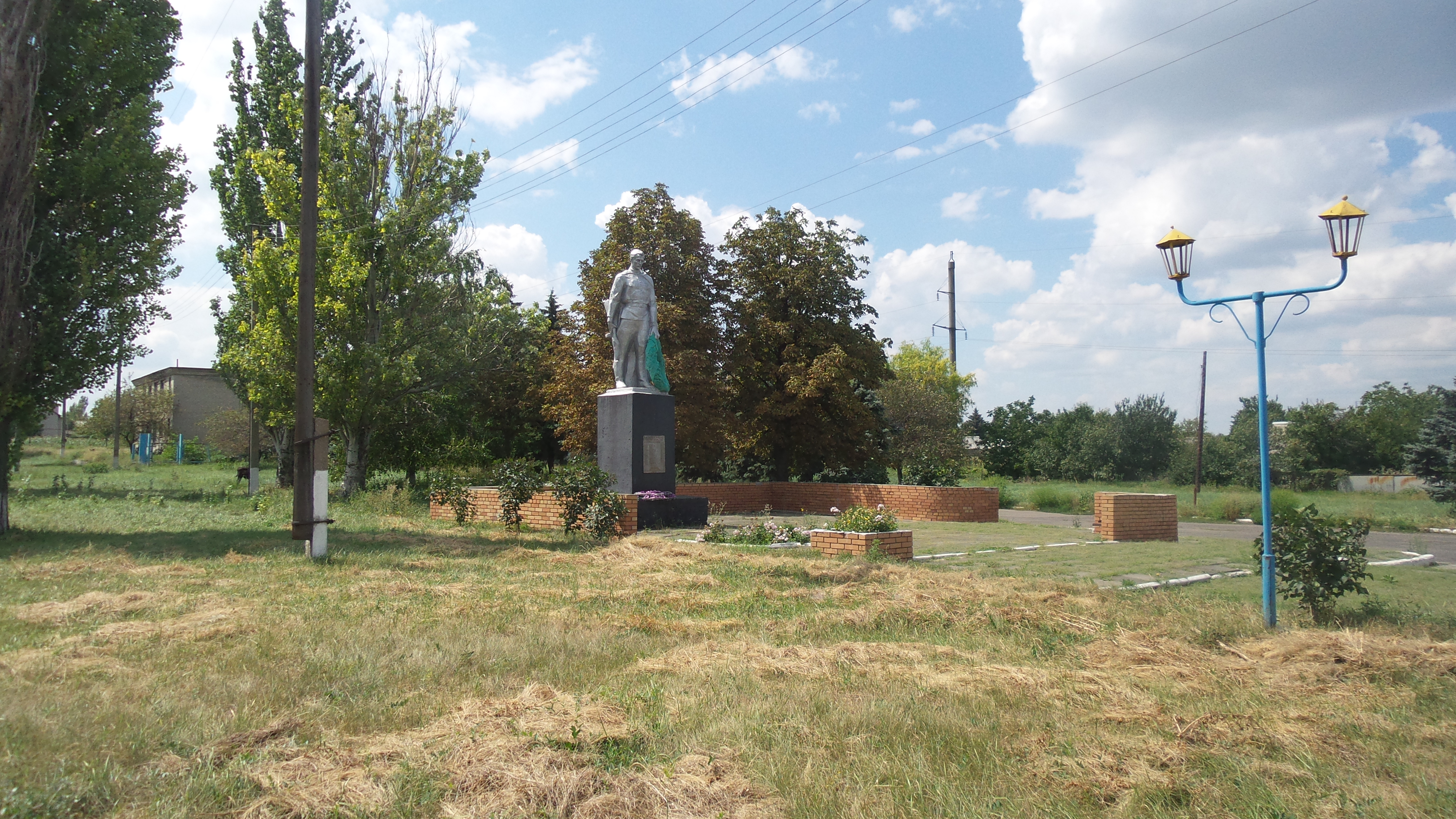

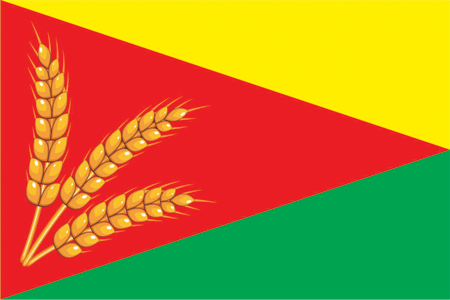
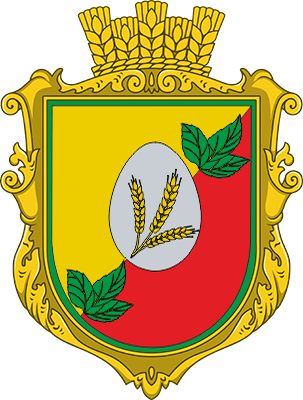
- Flag Coat of arms
- Interactive map of Berestove
- Location of Berestove within Ukraine Berestove (Ukraine)
- Coordinates: 48.763333°N 38.252778°E
- Country: Ukraine
- Oblast: Donetsk Oblast
- Raion: Bakhmut Raion
- Hromada: Soledar urban hromada
- Founded Status: 1887

Area
  - Total: 0.936 km^{2} (0.361 sq mi)
- Elevation: 188 m (617 ft)

Population (2001 census)
  - Total: 1,278
  - Density: 1,370/km^{2} (3,540/sq mi)
- Time zone: UTC+2 (EET)
  - Summer (DST): UTC+3 (EEST)
- Postal code: 84541
- Area code: +380 6274

Berestove (Ukrainian: Берестове; Russian: Берестовое, romanized: Berestovoye; German: Birkenfeld or Neu-Nikolaifeld) is a village in Bakhmut Raion (district) in Donetsk Oblast of eastern Ukraine, about 95.5 kilometres (59.3 mi) east-northeast from the centre of Donetsk city. It belongs to Soledar urban hromada, one of the hromadas of Ukraine.

== History ==
The village was taken under control by Russian forces on 25 July 2022, during the Russian invasion of Ukraine. The village was "essentially leveled" by Russian artillery during the fighting.
