= Chasiv Yar urban hromada =

Chasiv Yar urban hromada Часовоярська міська громада
- Hromada
- Interactive map of Chasiv Yar urban hromada
- Country: Ukraine
- Oblast: Donetsk Oblast
- Raion: Bakhmut Raion

Area
  - Total: 63.6 km^{2} (24.6 sq mi)

Population (2020)
  - Total: 13,411
  - Density: 211/km^{2} (546/sq mi)
- Settlements: 4
- Cities: 1
- Rural settlements: 1
- Villages: 2

Chasiv Yar urban hromada (Ukrainian: Часовоярська міська громада) is a hromada of Ukraine, located in Bakhmut Raion, Donetsk Oblast. It is administratively centered in the city Chasiv Yar.

It has an area of 63.6 square kilometres (24.6 mi^{2}), and a population of 13,411. As of 2020, 12,756 people lived in urban areas while 655 resided in rural areas.

It was created in 2020 per an order by the Ukrainian government via the merging of local councils in Bakhmut Raion.

The hromada contains 4 settlements: 1 city (Chasiv Yar), 1 rural settlement (Kalynivka), and 2 villages (Bohdanivka and Hryhorivka).

== See also ==
- List of hromadas of Ukraine
