= Pryvillia, Bakhmut Raion, Donetsk Oblast =

Pryvillia Привілля
- Village
- Location within Donetsk Oblast Location within Ukraine
- Coordinates: 48°43′27″N 37°52′08″E
- Country: Ukraine
- Oblast: Donetsk Oblast
- Raion: Bakhmut Raion
- Hromada: Soledar urban hromada
- Elevation: 130 m (430 ft)

Population
  - Total: 136
- Postal code: 84532
- Area code: +380-6274

Privillia (Ukrainian: Привілля) is a village located in Bakhmut Raion of Donetsk Oblast, Ukraine. It is located 10 kilometres (6.2 mi) northwest of Bakhmut.

== History ==
On 1 July 2023, during the Russian invasion of Ukraine, it was reported that the Ukrainian military engaged in operations near the village.

== See also ==
- List of villages in Donetsk Oblast
