= Pryvillia, Odesa Oblast =

Pryvillia Привілля
- Village
- Location of Pryvillia Pryvillia (Ukraine)
- Coordinates: 47°3′16″N 29°46′22″E
- Country: Ukraine
- Oblast: Odesa Oblast
- Raion: Rozdilna Raion
- Hromada: Velykoploske rural hromada
- Elevation: 159 m (522 ft)

Population (2001)
  - Total: 23
- Time zone: UTC+2 (EET)
  - Summer (DST): UTC+3 (EEST)
- Postal code: 67141
- Area code: +380 4859

Pryvillia (Ukrainian: Привілля) is a village in Rozdilna Raion, Odesa Oblast, Ukraine. It belongs to Velykoploske rural hromada, one of the hromadas of Ukraine.

== History ==
Until 18 July 2020, Pryvillia was located in Velyka Mykhailivka Raion. The raion was abolished in July 2020 as part of the administrative reform of Ukraine, which reduced the number of raions of Odesa Oblast to seven. The area of Velyka Mykhailivka Raion was merged into Rozdilna Raion.

== Demographics ==
According to the 1989 Soviet census, the population of Pryvillia was 36 people, of whom 15 were men and 21 women.

According to the 2001 Ukrainian census, 23 people lived in the village.

=== Languages ===
According to the 2001 census, the primary languages of the inhabitants of Pryvillia were:

Language	Percentage
Russian	78.26 %
Ukrainian	21.74 %
