= Bakhmut Raion =

Subdivision of Donetsk Oblast, Ukraine

Bakhmut Raion Бахмутський район
- Raion
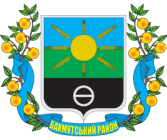
- Flag Coat of arms

- Interactive map of Bakhmut Raion
- Coordinates: 48°51′17.1858″N 38°6′15.4584″E
- Country: Ukraine
- Oblast: Donetsk Oblast
- Established: 1923
- Current form: July 2020
- Admin. center: Bakhmut
- Subdivisions: 7 hromadas

Area
  - Total: 1,747.6 km^{2} (674.8 sq mi)

Population (2022)
  - Total: 220,275
  - Density: 126.04/km^{2} (326.45/sq mi)
- Time zone: UTC+02:00 (EET)
  - Summer (DST): UTC+03:00 (EEST)
- Postal index: N/A
- Area code: 380
- Website: Verkhovna Rada website

Bakhmut Raion (Ukrainian: Бахмутський район, romanized: Bakhmutskyi raion), known as Artemivsk Raion (Ukrainian: Артемівський район) between 1924 and 2016, is a raion (district) within the northeastern part of Donetsk Oblast in eastern Ukraine. Its administrative center is Bakhmut. Its area is 1,687 square kilometres (651 sq mi), and its population is approximately 220,275 (2022 estimate).

== History ==
Bakhmut Raion was first created in 1923. It was renamed Artemivsk Raion in 1924 after its administrative center was renamed Artemivsk, named in honor of the Soviet figure Fyodor Sergeyev ("Comrade Artyom"). In 1926, Artemivsk Raion had a Jewish community of 17,622, making up 2.3% of the population. In 1932, Artemivsk became a city of oblast significance, meaning that while it still served as the administrative center of the raion, it was no longer part of it, instead being subordinated directly to the government of Donetsk Oblast. On 10 September 1959, Yama Raion was abolished, and its territory merged into Artemivsk Raion.

Due to the capture of parts of other raions by the separatist Donetsk People's Republic in 2014 during the war in Donbas, some small parts of other raions were transferred to Artemivsk Raion for administrative purposes. On 4 February 2016, the Verkhovna Rada renamed Artemivsk Raion back to Bakhmut Raion under decommunization reforms.

In November 2017, the village Hladosove in Horlivka Municipality was recaptured by Ukrainian forces. Since it was now effectively severed by the war's frontline from the rest of Horlivka Municipality, Hladosove was transferred to Bakhmut Raion for administrative purposes on 28 May 2019, increasing the size of the raion by 71.7 hectares.

On 18 July 2020, as part of the administrative reform of Ukraine, the number of raions of Donetsk Oblast was reduced to eight, of which only five were controlled by the government, and the area of Bakhmut Raion was significantly expanded. The separatist-controlled city Vuhlehirsk was transferred from Bakhmut Raion to Horlivka Raion. The January 2020 estimate of the raion population was 105,040 (2020 est.).

Since the beginning of the Russian invasion of Ukraine in February 2022, the region has been subjected to some the heaviest fighting of the war, which includes the battle of Soledar, the battle of Bakhmut, the battle of Toretsk and the battle of Chasiv Yar. As of June 2026, all of it is occupied by Russia, including Bakhmut, Soledar, Toretsk, Chasiv Yar, Siversk and Svitlodarsk.

== Subdivisions ==
After the reform in July 2020, the raion consists of 7 hromadas:

- Bakhmut urban hromada
- Chasiv Yar urban hromada
- Siversk urban hromada
- Soledar urban hromada
- Svitlodarsk urban hromada
- Toretsk urban hromada
- Zvanivka rural hromada

== Demographics ==
Population history
Year	Pop.	±% p.a.
1970	63,400	—
2000	55,600	−0.44%
2016	109,652	+4.34%
2020	105,040	−1.07%
2022	220,275	+44.81%

As of the 2001 Ukrainian census, the self-reported ethnic makeup of the raion was:

- Ukrainians: 78.7%
- Russians: 18.4%
- Belarusians: 0.7%
- Turks: 0.6%
- Armenians: 0.2%

== See also ==
- Administrative divisions of Donetsk Oblast
