= 90th Airmobile Battalion (Ukraine) =

Unit of the Ukrainian 81st Airmobile Brigade

- 90-й окремий аеромобільний батальйон
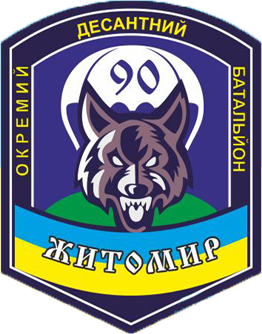
- Battalion Insignia
- Active: 2014-present
- Country: Ukraine
- Branch: Ukrainian Air Assault Forces
- Type: Battalion
- Role: Aerial Assault
- Part of: 81st Aeromobile Brigade
- Garrison/HQ: Kostiantynivka
- Nickname(s): Senior Lieutenant Ivan Zubkov Battalion; Battalion of Cyborgs
- Engagements: Russo-Ukrainian War: War in Donbas; Russian invasion of Ukraine
- Decorations: For Courage and Bravery

Commanders
- Current commander: Tsiba Vladyslav Vladyslavovich

The 90th Separate Airmobile Battalion "Senior Lieutenant Ivan Zubkov" is a battalion of the Ukrainian Air Assault Forces and is subordinated to the 81st Airmobile Brigade. It was established in 2014 on the basis of 95th Air Assault Brigade. It has seen combat in multiple battles during the War in Donbass and Russian invasion of Ukraine. It is also called the battalion of Cyborgs for its heroic defense of the Donetsk Airport. It is made up exclusively of volunteers.

== History ==
The battalion was officially established on 16 September 2014 on the basis of the personnel from 95th Air Assault Brigade, as a part of the 81st Airmobile Brigade with Major Kuzminykh Oleg Volodymyrovych taking the command of the battalion. It was trained at the 190th Training Center of the Air Assault Forces in Zhytomyr Oblast.

In late 2014, it was deployed at the Donetsk Airport replacing the 79th Air Assault Brigade and 95th Air Assault Brigade which were exhausted and needed rotation, and started its first combat operations during the Second Battle of Donetsk Airport. The battalion's first casualty was Andriy Tereshchenko who was killed in action at the Donetsk Airport on 2 December 2014. On 8 December 2014, three personnel of the battalion (Mykola Viktorovych Petruchenko, Serhii Mykolayovych Chop and Andriy Olegovich Remenyuk) were killed near Donetsk when separatists attacked their positions in Pisky. Since mid-December, the separatist outposts would inspect the battalion's vehicles so they transported grenades and cartridges in tires and in double bottoms, the battalion was supposed to be replaced before the new year but was redeployed to fight during the Second Battle of Donetsk Airport in mid January 2015. On 16 January, the battalion's positions were attacked by separatists using chemical weapons but caused no casualties. The battalion saw heavy combat on 19 January 2015, with five personnel (Vasyl Leonidovych Grigoriev, Havrilyuk Andriy Petrovych, Oleh Petrovych Musienko, Oleksiy Anatoliyovych Panchenko, and Yevhen Viktorovych Yatsina) in the battles, in and around the new terminal of the Donetsk Airport. The next day saw even more intensive combat with sixteen personnel of the battalion (Alekseychuk Vladyslav Volodymyrovych, Hasyuk Vitaly Arkadiyovych, Dmytro Yuriyovych Franyshyn, Gububa Volodymyr Mykolayovych, Oleg Chernysh Chernysh, Chupylka Anatoly Mykhailovych, Oleksandr Volodymyrovych Pitel, Prysiazhniuk Ruslan Anatoliyovych, Leonid Volodymyrovych Shevchuk, Buyluk Anatoliy Andriyovych, Ivan Ivanovych Zubkov, Serhii Mykolayovych Zulinsky, Yuriy Leonidovych Osaulko, Oleksandr Ivanovych Kondratyuk, Ivan Mykolayovych Marchenko and Oleksiy Volodymyrovych Marchenko) being killed in action throughout the airport while attempting to lift the environment to evacuate the wounded and in combat operations throughout the Donetsk Airport and surrounding areas. In addition three MTLBs, a truck, a military ambulance and an APC of the battalion were also destroyed by separatists on 20 January. Moreover, 15 personnel of the battalion including its commander Lt Col Kuzminykh Oleg Volodymyrovych were captured by separatists on January 20 and later released on 22 May. The fighting continued the next day with three more personnel (Ihor Viktorovych Bilyk, Branovytskyi Ihor Yevhenovich and Konoshenko Ruslan Serhiyovych) being killed in action. In total, during the Second Battle of Donetsk Airport, the battalion suffered 26 KIA and 60 wounded while the separatists suffered hundreds of casualties. Although the airport fell to separatists, but the defenders due to their heroic actions were named as Cyborgs. Even after the battle for the airport was over, the battalion continued to occupy all routes to it from Opytne, Vodiane and Ocheretyne with heavy fighting taking place along the Minsk II, with separatists attempting a large scale assault on battalion's positions on 20 March 2015 from the direction of airport but the separatists had to retreat after facing heavy losses.

Then the battalion continued fighting in Donetsk Oblast with a soldier (Andriy Stepanovych Horbenko) being killed in Opytne on 19 February, another soldier (Yaroslav Ivanovich Krevogubets) being killed outside the airport on 22 February 2015 and three more personnel (Oleksandr Ivanovych Batenko, Oleg Volodymyrovych Bykov and Hnatyuk Volodymyr Volodymyrovych) being killed in Vodiane, Opytne and Avdiivka on 26 February 2015. On 20 March 2015, the battalion successfully stopped an infiltration attempt by separatists in Opytne but a soldier (Maksym Volodymyrovych Rydzanich) was killed and two more were wounded in the engagement. It also saw action in Kostiantynivka with a soldier (Yatsun Oleksandr Vasyliovych) being killed by separatist shelling on 19 April 2015. On 30 December 2015, the battalion received the honorary name of the Hero of Ukraine, Senior Lieutenant Ivan Zubkov who was amongst personnel of the unit being killed in action during the Second Battle of Donetsk Airport directing artillery strikes till his last breath.

The battalion saw actions in Horlivka after the Battle of Horlivka during which on 10 January 2016, a soldier of the battalion (Avramchuk Viktor Viktorovych) was killed by separatist attack on the battalion's positions in Zaytseve. It also saw action near Avdiivka and its positions were shelled on 25 March with a soldier (Oleg Oleksandrovich Dovbnya) being killed and throughout April, it saw operational success, destroying separatist mortars and two separatist reconnaissance squads, with its personnel seeing combat behind the separatist lines as well as repelling separatist attacks on the battalion's positions during which a soldier (Kabushka Myroslav Oleksiyovych) was killed on 14 April, another (Oleksandr Anatoliyovych Balkovy) on 23 April and a third soldier (Cyklauri Revazo Shotayevich) on 29 April. On 23 May 2016, two soldiers of the battalion (Oleksandr Stepanovych Biryukov and Andriy Yaroslavovych Smilnytskyi) were killed in combat operations in Avdiivka and another soldier (Efremov Dmytro Serhiyovych) was killed in Avdiivka on 25 May.

The battalion performed demining operations in Kurakhovo and Marinka starting in March 2017 during which a soldier (Chipenko Rostyslav Anatoliyovych) was killed on 8 May 2017 as a result of mine explosion while saving the lives of four other personnel.

After the Russian invasion of Ukraine, the battalion saw intensive combat. The battalion participated in the Battle of Izium defending Kamyanka since March 2022 with fierce fighting taking place during which two soldiers (Stroganov Dmytro Dmytrovych and Ruslan Yuriyovych Pavlov) was killed in action on 16 March 2022. On 17 May 2022, the battalion's positions in Donetsk Oblast were shelled by Russian forces resulting in the death of one personnel (Serhii Volodymyrovych Kulyk) near Bohorodychne. On 20 May 2022, the battalion engaged Russian forces in Bohorodychne during which a soldier (Krymskyi Ivan Stepanovych) was killed in action. The battalion's fire support company also bore heavy casualties throughout June 2022 with a soldier (Volodymyr Karpluk) being killed on June 17, another (Oleg Hryban) on June 19, two more personnel (Andriy Kholodov and Serhii Olegovich Sokolovsky) on June 29. Two more personnel were killed in November one (Kordyukov Volodymyr) on November 6 and another (Vasyl Dmytrovych Dubrovnyi) on November 7, 2022. On 17 November 2022, the battalion was awarded the honorary award "For Courage and Bravery".

The battalion saw combat throughout Luhansk Oblast in 2023 with a soldier (Andrii Volodymyrovych Artkleber) being killed on January 17 and another (Viktor Hryhorovych Sheludko) on 2 May 2023 near Bilohorivka.

The battalion again saw action near Bilohorivka in Luhansk Oblast in 2024 with a soldier (Serhiy Prysakar) being killed on 11 June 2024.

== Commanders ==
- Lieutenant Colonel Kuzminykh Oleg Volodymyrovych (2014–2015)
- Colonel Oleksandr Viktorovych Lykhman (2015–2018)
- Lieutenant Colonel Vadim Anatoliyovych Mukhin (2018–2019)
- Lieutenant Colonel Ruslan Volodymyrovych Maryshev (2019–2022)
- Tsiba Vladyslav Vladyslavovich (2022-)

== Structure ==
- 1st Air Assault Company
- 2nd Air Assault Company
- 3rd Air Assault Company
- Fire Support Company
- FPV Strike Group “90/81 Apachi”
- Mortar battery
- Howitzer battery
- Support Platoons

== Sources ==
- Книга пам'яті полеглих за Україну (The Memory Book for the fallen soldiers of the 81st Brigade)
