= 122nd Airmobile Battalion (Ukraine) =

- 122-й окремий аеромобільний батальйон
- Battalion Insignia
- Active: April 1, 2015 – August 23, 2025
- Country: Ukraine
- Branch: Ukrainian Air Assault Forces
- Type: Battalion
- Role: Aerial Assault
- Part of: 81st Aeromobile Brigade
- Garrison/HQ: Donetsk Oblast
- Nickname: Battalion of Cyborgs
- Motto: Hell Hardened
- Engagements: Russo-Ukrainian War: War in Donbas; Russian invasion of Ukraine
- Decorations: For Courage and Bravery

Commanders
- Current commander: Lunyov Oleksandr Ihorovych

Insignia
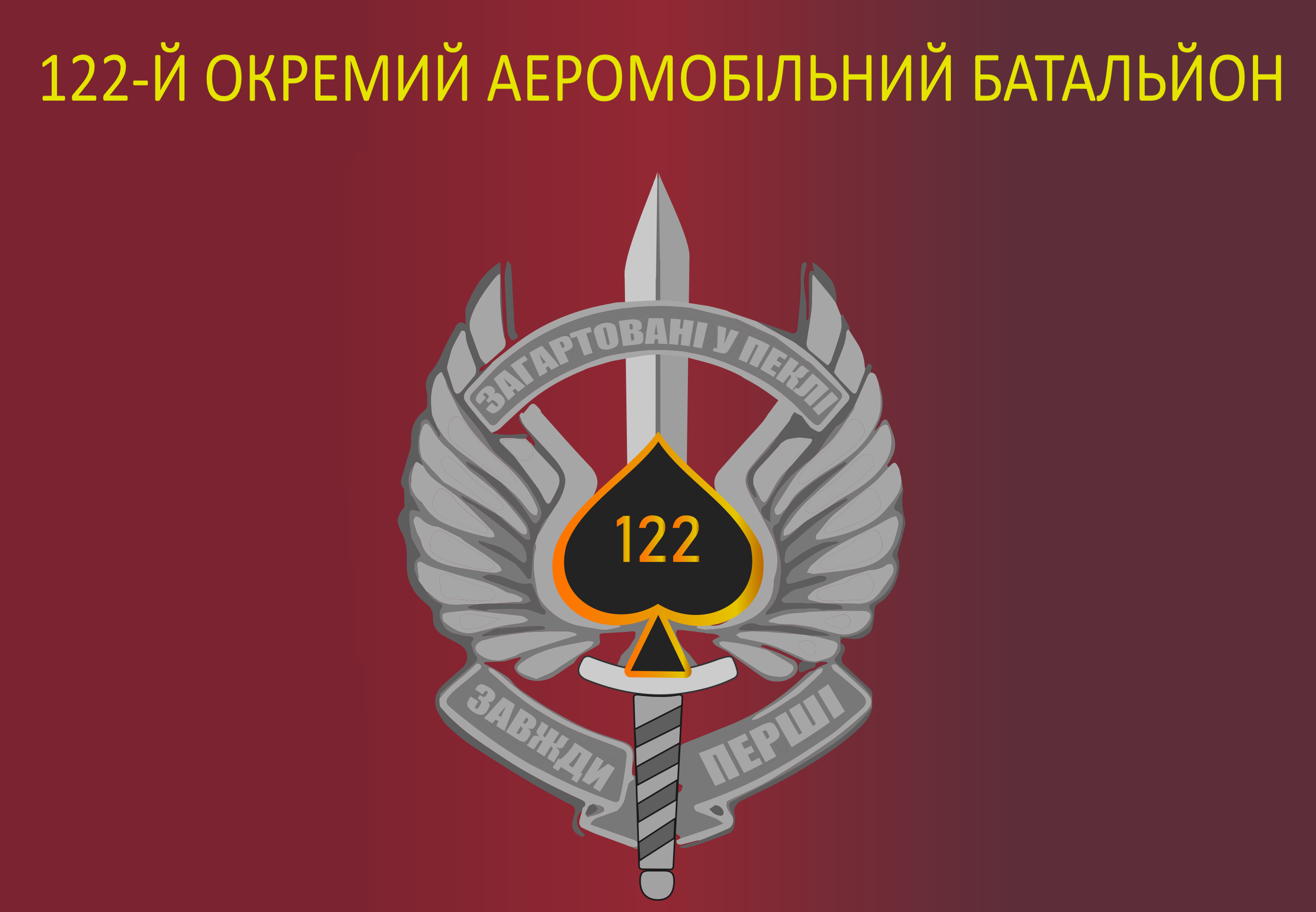
- Flag (2014-2025)

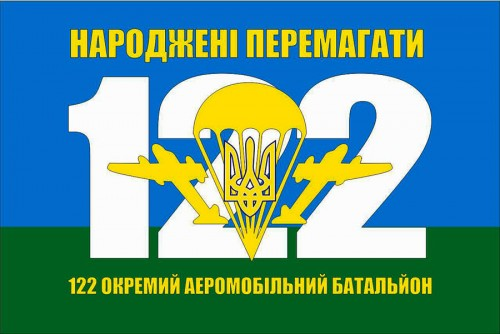
- Flag (Until 2014)

The 122nd Separate Airmobile Battalion was a battalion of the Ukrainian Air Assault Forces and is subordinated to the 81st Airmobile Brigade. It was established in 2014 based on the 3rd Airborne Battalion of the 80th Air Assault Brigade. It has seen combat in multiple battles during the war in Donbas and Russian invasion of Ukraine. It's also amongst the battalions of Cyborgs for its defense of the Donetsk Airport.

== History ==
The battalion was established as a part of the 81st Airmobile Brigade in 2014 based on the 3rd Airborne Battalion of the 80th Air Assault Brigade and was immediately deployed to Donetsk Airport and took part in the Second Battle of Donetsk Airport from December 2014 till the end of the battle. A soldier (Kushnir Yury Ivanovich) was killed on 18 January. On 19 January 2015, a soldier of the battalion (Buzenko Volodymyr Petrovych) was killed in combat in the terminal of the Donetsk Airport. A soldier of the battalion (Valentin Leonidovych Opanasenko) and the battalion's assistant commander (Andriy Mykolayovych Karpyuk) were killed on 20 January 2015 as a result of the collapse of a terminal of Donetsk Airport due to separatist shelling.

In early 2015, the battalion saw combat near Avdiivka, and on 3 April 2015, a soldier of the battalion (Andriy Mykolayovych Karpyuk) along with two other soldiers of the 81st Brigade was killed and two more wounded with one succumbing to his injuries two days later.

In early 2016, the battalion saw action during the battle for Niu York with a soldier of the battalion (Valentin Mykolayovych Churikov) being killed on 7 April 2016 as a result of shelling and another soldier (Serhii Volodymyrovych Isaev) being killed on 25 April 2016 as a result of a mine explosion.

Throughout 2016, the battalion also saw heavy combat in Avdiivka with a soldier of the battalion (Andriy Mykolayovych Popov) being killed on 26 June 2016 and another soldier (Taras Mykolayovych Novoselov) being killed the next day. On 6 July 2016, the battalion's positions in Avdiivka were shelled by separatists killing two soldiers of the battalion (Oleg Lysevych Stepanovych and Sergeyev Volodymyr Ihorovych) and wounding three others. The battalion's positions were again shelled on the night of 13 July 2016 near Avdiivka using mortar and artillery killing a soldier of the battalion (Mamchiy Stanislav Yuriyovych). On 24 July 2016, three paratroopers of the battalion engaged a separatist squad near Avdiivka, although the paratroopers were outnumbered but still the paratroopers inflicted heavy casualties on the separatists but amongst the three, two (Arsienko Ruslan Leonidovych and Golub Oleh Volodymyrovych) were killed and the third unknown paratrooper was wounded. On 17 August 2016, the battalion's positions in Avdiivka were again shelled by separatists using mortars killing a soldier of the battalion (Serhii Petrovych Kovalchuk) of the battalion. On 16 September 2016, while performing a combat demining mission in Avdiivka during which a soldier of the battalion (Tryvolenko Vladyslav Volodymyrovych) was killed as a result of mine explosion while saving the lives of other personnel. The battalion engaged separatists in Chermalyk in 2019 with a soldier of the battalion (Fursov Yevhen Oleksandrovych) being killed on 23 February 2019 as a result of a direct ATGM hit.

On 14 February 2021, an explosion went off in Novoluhanske killing three soldiers including one soldier of the battalion (Myronenko Dmytro Olegovich), the cause of the explosion wasn't determined.

On 17 November 2022, the battalion was awarded the honorary award "For Courage and Bravery" for its actions during the Russo-Ukrainian war.

On 6 February 2024, during the Russian invasion of Ukraine, a soldier of the battalion (Ivan Ivanovych Honcharenko) was killed in action while defending his position in Bilohorivka, Luhansk Oblast and was posthumously awarded the "Hero of Ukraine", the highest military award for Ukrainian personnel.

The battalion was disbanded in August 2025. From its remnants, a new formation—the 3rd Airmobile Battalion of the 81st Airmobile Brigade was created.

== Commanders ==
- Lieutenant Colonel Valery Kurko (2014–2015)
- Lt. Col. Gurin Serhii Gennadiyovych (2015–2017)
- Lunyov Oleksandr Ihorovych (2017-)

== Structure ==
- 1st Air Assault Company
- 2nd Air Assault Company
- 3rd Air Assault Company
- Fire Support Company
- FPV Drone Unit "Krabs Team"
- Mortar battery
- Howitzer battery
- Support Platoons
