= 81st Airmobile Brigade =

Brigade of the Ukrainian Air Assault Forces

- 81-ша окрема аеромобільна бригада
- Shoulder Sleeve Insignia
- Founded: 7 October 2014
- Country: Ukraine
- Allegiance: Armed Forces of Ukraine
- Branch: Ukrainian Air Assault Forces
- Role: Air assault forces
- Part of: 7th Rapid Response Corps
- Garrison/HQ: Kramatorsk, Donetsk Oblast
- Motto: Born to win
- Engagements: War in Donbas; Russian invasion of Ukraine: Battle of Sumy
- Decorations: For Courage and Bravery
- Website: https://www.facebook.com/81oaembr

Insignia
- Flag

The 81st Airmobile Brigade "Slobozhanske" (Ukrainian: 81-ша окрема аеромобільна Слобожанська бригада; 81 ОАеМБр) is a brigade of the Ukrainian Air Assault Forces. The brigade fought in the war in Donbas and in the 2022 Russian invasion of Ukraine.

== History ==
=== War in Donbas (2014–2022) ===
The 81st Airmobile Brigade was formed on 7 October 2014 from elements of the 25th Airborne Brigade, the 80th Air Assault Brigade and the 95th Air Assault Brigade, and was initially headquartered in Kramatorsk.

The brigade took part in the battle of the Donetsk airport for eighty days between November 2014 and January 2015, and its soldiers were reportedly the last Ukrainian forces to retreat from the airport. Units of the 81st Brigade were also among the Ukrainian forces encircled at Debaltseve. A company tactical group of the brigade's 122nd Airmobile Battalion held the front line in the industrial zone of Avdiivka from mid-March 2015 until the end of July.

In May 2015, the volunteer OUN Battalion became part of the brigade.

On 9 June 2015, brigade Lieutenant Ivan Zubkov was awarded the title Hero of Ukraine posthumously for calling in artillery fire on himself during the battle at Donetsk Airport. The brigade's 90th Airmobile Battalion was named for Zubkov on 30 December of that year.

Units of the 81st Brigade including the 90th Battalion held positions at Vodiane and Sieverne between August 2015 and March 2016.

In January 2016, units of the brigade took part in combat at Zaitseve and later held the defense of Novhorodske. Starting in December 2016, units of the 81st took part in combat at Svitlodarsk.

Units of the brigade were assigned to Ukraine's southern operational-tactical group to conduct operations at Chaplynka in Kherson Oblast on the border with Crimea.

Between July 2019 and March 2020, units of the brigade's 90th and 122nd Battalions were assigned to the 46th Airmobile Brigade.

=== Russia–Ukraine war (2022–present) ===
==== Operations in the Sumy Oblast ====
Units of the brigade's 5th Battalion Tactical Group took part in combat with Russian forces in the city of Sumy on 24 February, the first day of the Russian invasion of Ukraine.

==== Operations in the Kharkiv and Donetsk Oblasts ====
By the end of February, the brigade's 90th Airmobile Battalion had taken up the defense of the city of Izium, which it held for about a month. Afterwards, some units took up the defense of Oleksandrivka. On 30 April 2022, units of the brigade were withdrawn from the front line through Sviatohirsk.

In July 2022, units of the brigade took part in combat near Sloviansk and Sviatohirsk in the Donetsk Oblast; the 90th Battalion reportedly held the village of Dolyna. The 81st Brigade continued to operate in the Donetsk Oblast the next month.

==== Operations in the Luhansk Oblast ====
The brigade's 122nd Battalion took part in combat with Russian forces at Bilovodsk and Svatove in the Luhansk Oblast and later took up the defense of Sievierodonetsk, Rubizhne, and Lysychansk.

In May 2022, units of the brigade took part in combat in the Luhansk Oblast, including at Sievierodonetsk. The brigade's 122nd Battalion has been credited with maintaining the defense of Sievierodonetsk, Rubizhne, and Lysychansk for eighty days, which reportedly restrained the Russian advance and gave other Ukrainian units time to prepare for offensive operations.

==== 2022 counteroffensive ====
On 11 September 2022, amid an ongoing Ukrainian counteroffensive, elements of the brigade raised the Ukrainian flag over the village of Bohorodychne, after having fought for it for more than three months.

Over the course of the counteroffensive, after retaking Bohorodychne, units of the brigade were responsible for recapturing the settlements of Sviatohirsk and Yarova on 15 September. Units of the 81st Brigade would go on to recapture Sosnove and Oleksandrivka.

On 24 September, Russian military bloggers reported that units of the brigade had retaken half of the village of Novoselivka. By the 28th, it was reported that Novoselivka had been fully recaptured by elements of the 81st Brigade and the National Guard of Ukraine. The brigade has also been credited with the recapture of Shandryholove.

By the evening of 1 October 2022, the 81st Brigade had established control over the city of Lyman. Units of the 81st Brigade entered the city from the direction of Drobysheve. The brigade was involved in combat near the city later in the month. It has been reported that units of the 81st took control of the village of Bilohorivka in the Luhansk Oblast in October 2022.

During May 2023, units of the 81st Brigade were holding the front line in the Donetsk Oblast on the Lyman front. On 20 November 2023, the brigade was awarded the honorary title "Slobozhanske" by decree of President Volodymyr Zelenskyy.

==== Operations in Bilohorivka (2024–present) ====
Units of the 81st Brigade were reportedly operating near Bilohorivka in the Luhansk Oblast during January 2024, February 2024, March 2024, May 2024, June 2024, and August 2024.

As of January 2025, units of the brigade's 1st Battalion were operating in the area of Bilohorivka. Units of the 81st Brigade remained on the Siversk front in March, June, and July 2025.

== Structure ==
As of 2024 the brigade's structure is as follows:

- 81st Airmobile Brigade, Kramatorsk
  - Headquarters & Headquarters Company
  - 1st Airmobile Battalion (formed in 2022)
    - UAV Unit "SowaFm"
  - 2nd Airmobile Battalion (formed in 2022)
  - 3rd Airmobile Battalion (formed in 2025)
  - 90th Airmobile Battalion (Kostiantynivka) (created in September 2014 on the basis of the 95th Air Assault Brigade and made up exclusively of volunteers). Deputy Commander Dmytro Chapalika.
    - FPV Strike Group "90/81 Apachi"
  - ~~122nd Airmobile Battalion (Druzhkivka) (formed in the fall of 2014 on the basis of the 3rd battalion of the 80th Air Assault Brigade).~~ (disestablished in 2025)
    - ~~FPV Drone Unit "Krabs Team"~~
  - 5th Battalion Tactical Group (Poltava)
  - Tank Company
  - Reconnaissance Company
  - Sniper Company
  - Aerial Reconnaissance Unit "Black Raven Group"
  - Artillery Group (brigade artillery group equipped with 2S1 self-propelled artillery vehicles).
  - Anti-Aircraft Artillery Division
  - Support units (this includes all rear elements such as engineers, communication, medics, and material support unit).
