= 5th Battalion Tactical Group =

- 5-та батальйонна тактична група
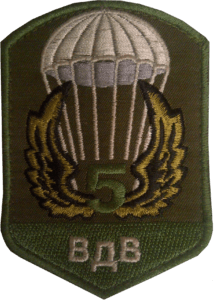
- Battalion Tactical Group Insignia
- Active: 2015-present
- Country: Ukraine
- Branch: Ukrainian Air Assault Forces
- Type: Battalion tactical group
- Role: Combined arms warfare
- Part of: 81st Aeromobile Brigade
- Garrison/HQ: Talakivka
- Engagements: Russo-Ukrainian War: War in Donbas; Russian invasion of Ukraine

Commanders
- Current commander: Col. Ishkulov Emil Shamilovich

Insignia
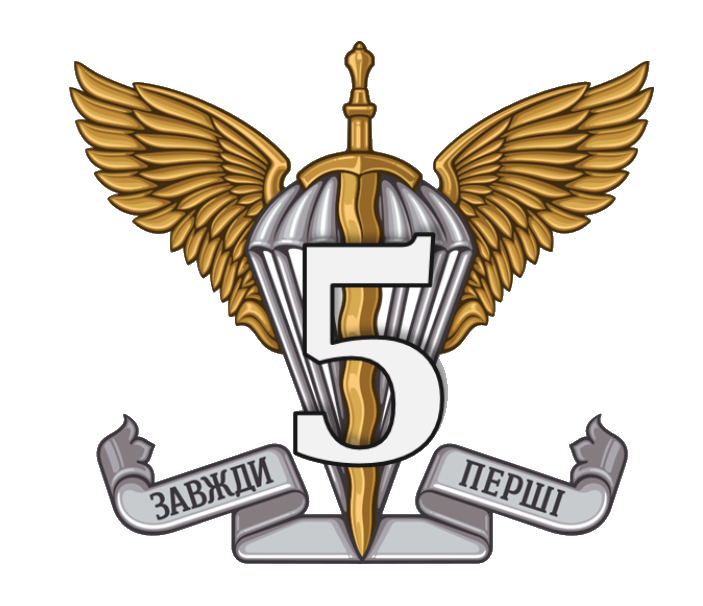
- Armband Badge

5th Battalion Tactical Group is a Battalion tactical group of the Ukrainian Air Assault Forces and is subordinated to 81st Aeromobile Brigade of the Air Assault Forces. It was established in 2015 as a combined arms warfare unit and since then, has taken part in multiple engagements. It is garrisoned at Talakivka in Poltava Oblast.

== History ==
On December 31, 2014, the directive for establishment of the battalion at Kremenchuk was signed and it was supposed to be headquartered at the base of 107th Rocket Artillery Regiment, but due to space unavailability the plan was ultimately changed in favor of establishing a new base at Zhytomyr.

Its establishment started at the 37th combined military training ground near Zhytomyr in March 2015 and the unit received personnel, equipment and weapons, and additional training was carried out till June 2015. Many volunteers, including the famous writer, Oleg Anatoliyovych Chuyko also volunteered as a part of the battalion and Oleg Anatoliyovych Chuyko became the battalion's first commander.

On June 12, 2015, after complete preparation it was deployed to ATO zone especially at the city of Mykolaivka in Donetsk Oblast. It became a part of the 81st Aeromobile Brigade on 16 June 2015.

In January 2019, the battalion was deployed from Mykolaivka to Terentiivka.

In March 2022, the battalion was deployed to Zaporizhzhia Oblast where since then, it has been actively taking part in the Battle of Huliaipole.

== Commanders ==
- Oleg Anatoliyovych Chuyko (2015)
- Gerasimenko Ihor Leonidovych (2016–2021)
- Ishkulov Emil Shamilovich (2022-)
