= Ivan Zubkov =

Ukrainian Airmobile Forces senior lieutenant (1973–2015)

- Born: 1 November 1973; Derazhnia, Khmelnytskyi Oblast, Ukrainian SSR, USSR
- Died: 20 January 2015 (aged 41); Donetsk, Ukraine
- Military career
- Allegiance: Ukraine
- Branch: Ukrainian Airmobile Forces
- Service years: 1995–1998; 2014–2015
- Rank: Senior lieutenant
- Unit: 81st Airmobile Brigade
- Conflicts: Russo-Ukrainian War; War in Donbas; Battle of Donetsk Airport †
- Awards: Order of the Gold Star (posthumously)

Ivan Ivanovych Zubkov (Ukrainian: Іван Іванович Зубков; 1 November 1973 – 20 January 2015) was a Ukrainian Airmobile Forces senior lieutenant and a posthumous Hero of Ukraine. He fought in the war in Donbas as a fire support officer and was killed during the Second Battle of Donetsk Airport. Zubkov was posthumously awarded the title Hero of Ukraine and the Order of the Gold Star on 9 June 2015.

== Early life ==
Zubkov was born on 1 November 1973 in Derazhnia, the son of Antonina and Ivan Zubkov. Between 1987 and 1991 he studied at the city's Secondary School No. 3. He went on to attend the Kyiv Military Naval School, graduating in 1995 and choosing to serve with Ukraine instead of Russia. Zubkov served with the 19th Rocket Division of the 43rd Rocket Army in Khmelnytskyi until he left the Ukrainian Armed Forces in 1998 and became a manager at a meat factory. He later founded his own transport business. Zubkov married Irina and had two daughters: Valentina (born 2002) and Sofia (born 2013). During the winter of 2013 to 2014, he participated in the Euromaidan protests against the government of Viktor Yanukovych.

== War in Donbas ==
He joined the Ukrainian Airmobile Forces in late summer 2014, after the war in Donbas began. Zubkov became a deputy fire support company commander in the new 90th Separate Airborne Battalion of the 81st Airmobile Brigade. He fought in the Second Battle of Donetsk Airport from late December 2014. On 18 January 2015, Zubkov participated in the Ukrainian assault to relieve troops trapped in the airport. He led the defense against counterattacks and called in artillery on himself. On 19 January he was wounded, but remained in the new terminal with his men. He helped evacuate wounded soldiers. On the next day, Zubkov was killed while covering his unit's retreat when separatists collapsed the second floor onto them. He was buried in Derazhnia on April 30, after his body was found in the rubble.

In 2015, Zubkov was awarded the Ukrainian Orthodox Church of the Kyivan Patriarchate's Medal for Sacrifice and Love for Ukraine. Zubkov was posthumously awarded the title Hero of Ukraine and the Order of the Gold Star on 9 June 2015 for his "exceptional courage, heroism and sacrifice, in the defense of national sovereignty and territorial integrity of the Ukrainian state, and loyalty to the military oath."

== Legacy ==
On 20 August, Zubkov was made an honorary citizen of Letychiv, where his parents had moved. Secondary School No. 3 in Derazhnia, where he studied, was named for Zubkov. A memorial plaque was also added to the school building. On 30 December 2015, the 81st Airmobile Brigade's 90th Separate Airmobile Battalion, in which Zubkov had served, was renamed in honor of him.

== See also ==
- List of heroes of Ukraine
- List of people from Ukraine
