= Cyborgs (Donetsk airport) =

Ukrainian volunteer militia who fought at Donetsk Airport

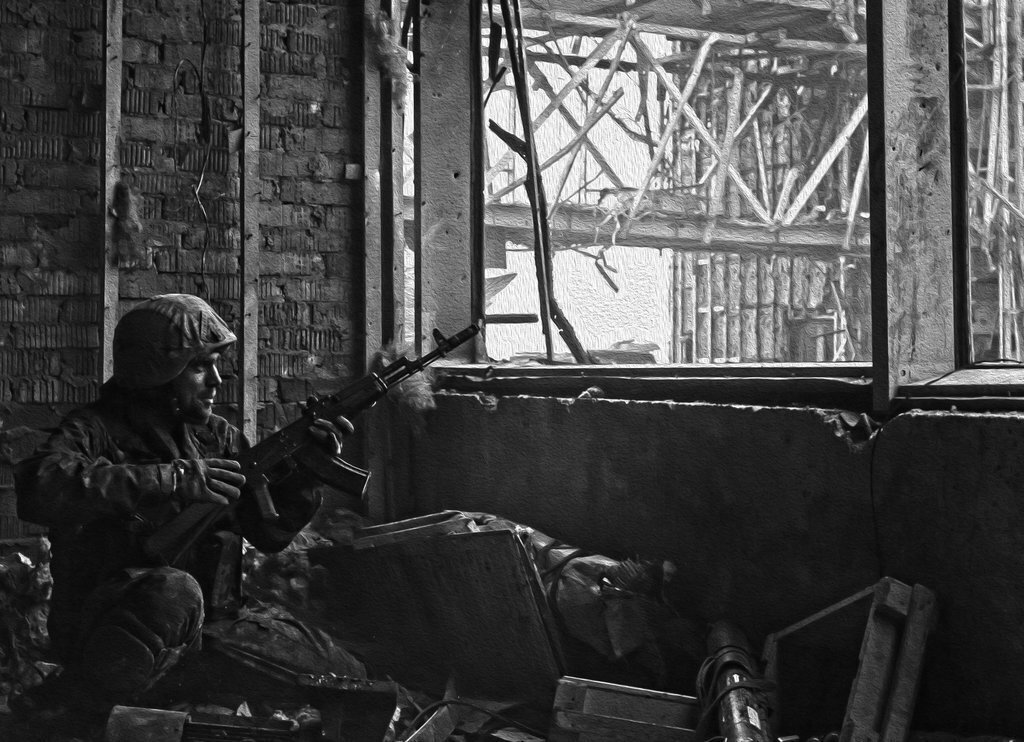
A Ukrainian soldier inside Donetsk Airport during fighting in 2014

The Cyborgs (Ukrainian: Кіборги, romanized: Kiborhy) are Ukrainian servicemen who volunteered to defend Donetsk International Airport during the war in eastern Ukraine (26 May 2014 – 22 January 2015).

== The origin of the name ==
The science fiction term cyborg denotes a being that contains mechanical or electronic components to replace or complement its organs. The term in the context of the Russo-Ukrainian war may have originated from a 2014 Facebook post. A user recounted the words of a report that referred to Ukrainian defenders as cyborgs when explaining why Donetsk airport had remained uncaptured for three months.

In 2014 this meaning was included in the Ukrainian online dictionary Myslovo, and President Petro Poroshenko New Year's address included the word.

== Involved units ==
Insignia of the 79th and 80th Separate Airborne Assault Brigades

The Ukrainian units that fought in the proximity of the airport and in the nearby village of Pisky included:

- 3rd Separate Special Purpose Regiment
- 79th Air Assault Brigade
- 80th Air Assault Brigade
- 81st Airmobile Brigade
- 95th Air Assault Brigade
- 93rd Mechanized Brigade
- 57th Motorized Brigade
- 90th Airmobile Battalion
- 74th Separate Reconnaissance Battalion
- Dnipro-1 regiment
- Volunteer Ukrainian Corps

The number of servicemen involved in operations at the airport is difficult to establish, but it was established that 100 soldiers were killed (including 4 missing with at least one suspected to have defected). Between 290-305 were wounded during the fighting.

== Events ==
=== 2014 ===
During the 2014 Russian annexation of Crimea, servicemen of the Armed Forces of Ukraine were involved in the protection of Donetsk Airport: from the 3rd separate special purpose regiment and the 95th separate airmobile brigade. The first attempt to seize the airport by supporters of the so-called Donetsk People's Republic happened on 17 April 2014.

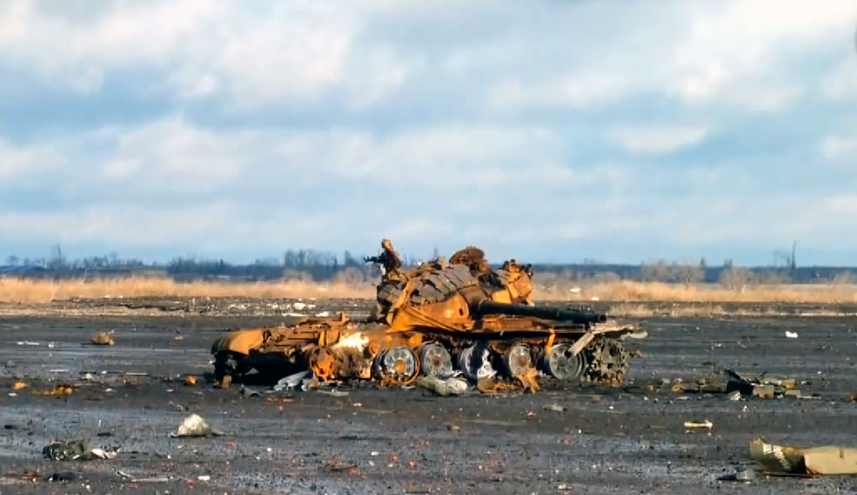
Burned tank, 24 December 2014

As of 26 November, the 81st separate mechanized brigade was included in the combat forces in the area of the Anti-Terrorist Operation. On 1 December, part of the 1st company-tactical group of the 90th battalion of the 81st was transferred as a garrison from Pisky to the airport.

As a result of regular peace talks, an agreement was reached on a complete ceasefire in the anti-terrorist operation zone starting at 10:00 on 9 December 2014. According to these agreements, the DIAP was to rotate through the "green corridor" - a checkpoint for militia. Ukrainian soldiers were restricted to carrying only firearms and a limited amount of ammunition. Militia have the right to search the checkpoint of servicemen of the Armed Forces of Ukraine.

=== 2015 ===
The "green corridor", which Ukrainian soldiers called the "corridor of shame", lasted a little over a month. In January 2015, hostilities resumed.

At 14:56 there was a second explosion in the new terminal from the detonation of three tons of TNT - as a result, three floors of the terminal ceased to exist. Inside, less than half of the 55 defenders who remained, survived. The last 16 people surrendered on 21 January. The critically wounded were sent to the hospital, and the rest were tortured.

On 22 January 17, prisoners were forced to walk the streets of Donetsk in the so-called "Parade". The Ukrainian Prosecutor General's Office classifies such acts as a violation of the 1949 Geneva Convention relative to the Treatment of Prisoners of War.

Over the next few days, several dozen militants on the outskirts of the resort were killed by Ukrainian intelligence. On 27 January, the Armed Forces recaptured part of the airport to retrieve the bodies of seven dead soldiers.

The last five "cyborgs" were given to the Ukrainian side on 22 February 2015, as part of an exchange of 139 Ukrainian soldiers for 52 captured militants.

In March 2015, on the territory of the new terminal, Ukrainian prisoners under the escort of armed militia cleared the debris and retrieved the bodies of their dead comrades. The remains were taken to the Donetsk morgue, and later transferred to the city of Dnipro.

== Awards ==
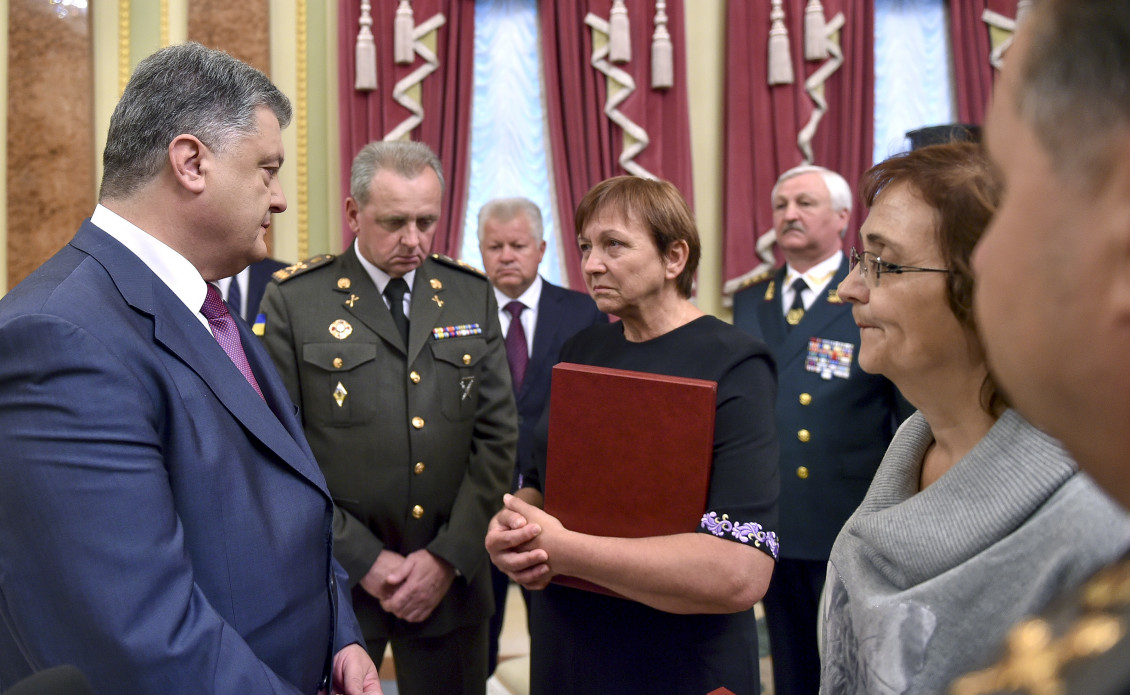
President Poroshenko presents the Golden Star Orders of the Hero of Ukraine to the mothers of Igor Branovytsky and Serhiy Kolodiy. 5 September 2016

For the defense of the airport received the honorary title of Hero of Ukraine:

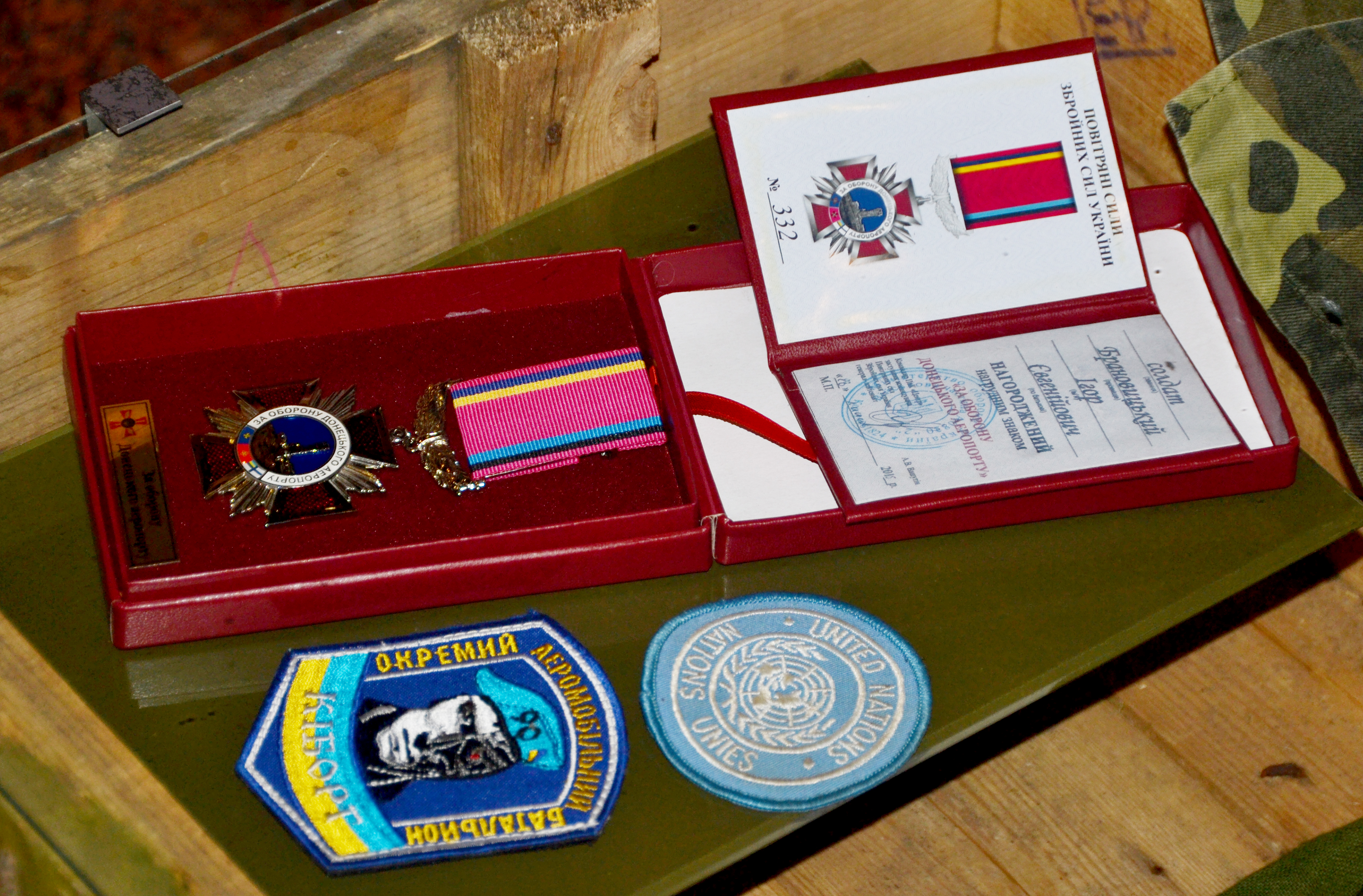
The Cyborgs badge of Branovytsky Igor Yevhenovych

- Soldier Branovytsky Igor Yevhenovych (23 August 2016, posthumously)
- Junior Sergeant Igor Zinich (14 October 2015, posthumously)
- Senior Lieutenant Zubkov Ivan Ivanovich (10 June 2015, posthumously)
- Captain Kolodiy Serhiy Volodymyrovych (23 August 2016, posthumously)
- Major Mezhevikin Yevhen Mykolayovych (14 October 2015)
- Volunteer Tabala Serhiy Oleksandrovych (21 November 2016, posthumously)

On 27 January 2015, Poroshenko awarded the tankers who on 22 January ensured the exit of Ukrainian units from the encirclement at the airport. In particular, Lieutenant Yevhen Honchar was awarded the Order of Bohdan Khmelnytsky III degree, Sergeant Konstantin Baltarga, Soldier Volodymyr Sukhanin and Gunner Soldier Dmytro Trynoha the Order For Courage III degree.

19 October 2014 Oleksandr Turchynov, Chairman of The Verkhovna Rada of Ukraine, awarded nine Ukrainian soldiers defending the Donetsk Airport with commemorative engraved "Named Pistols".

The non-governmental award, the badge "For the Defense of Donetsk Airport", has been awarded by the NGO "Brothers of Ukraine" since 2015.

== The value of the feat ==
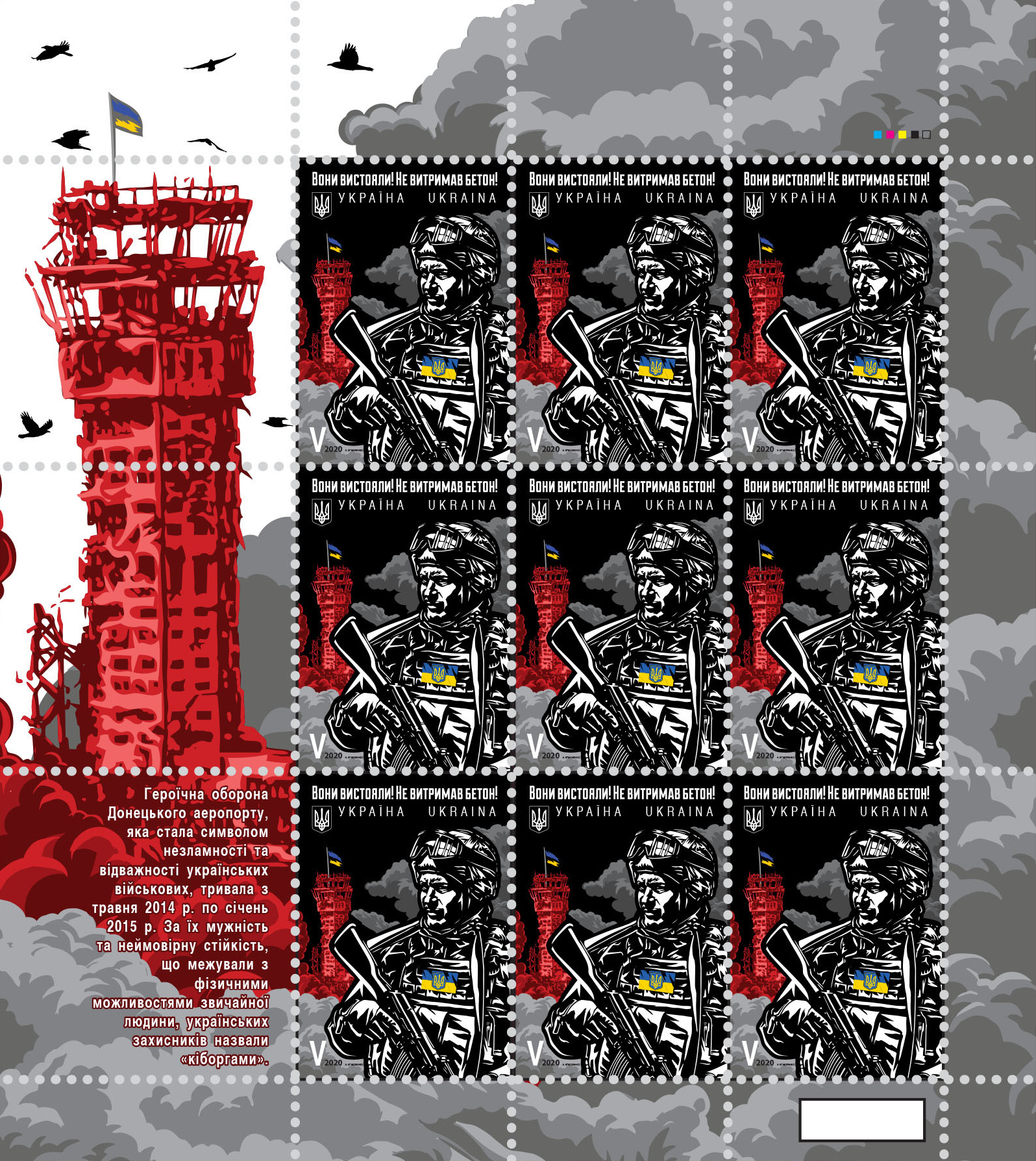
Block of postage stamps

The defense of Donetsk airport lasted 242 days - only a week less than the siege of Sevastopol (2 November 1941 – 3 July 1942), and much longer than the defense of Brest Fortress (22 June – 20 July 1941) during the German-Soviet war.

The airport was of special importance for the logistics of the Armed Forces of Ukraine. After the enemy retained control of about 150 kilometers of the state border in May, the maintenance of airports was no longer a deterrent to Russian aggression. However, this territory could become a springboard for the attack of Ukrainian troops on Donetsk.

According to the results of the Minsk Protocol, the warring parties were to create a 30-kilometer demarcation zone between pro-Russian troops and Ukrainian troops. In this regard, the field commanders of the militants decided to win a demonstrative political victory. They launched a frontal attack to declare that the Ukrainians had not left on their own and that the airport had been stormed by the time the 30-kilometer zone was created and Ukrainian troops were withdrawn.

Despite the retreat of the last defenders directly from the territory of the Donetsk airport, positions of the Ukrainian forces pass in close proximity to it, and therefore fighting of various intensity proceeded there for a long time.

According to Major General Oleg Mikats, the Ukrainian forces' hold of the airfield restrained the enemy's forces. The biggest battle of Debaltseve began after the fall of the DIAP, and if the Ukrainian military was not there, the Armed Forces could lose not only Debaltseve.

The losses of militants during the entire campaign amounted to at least 800 people killed and 1,500-2,000 wounded.

== Honoring ==
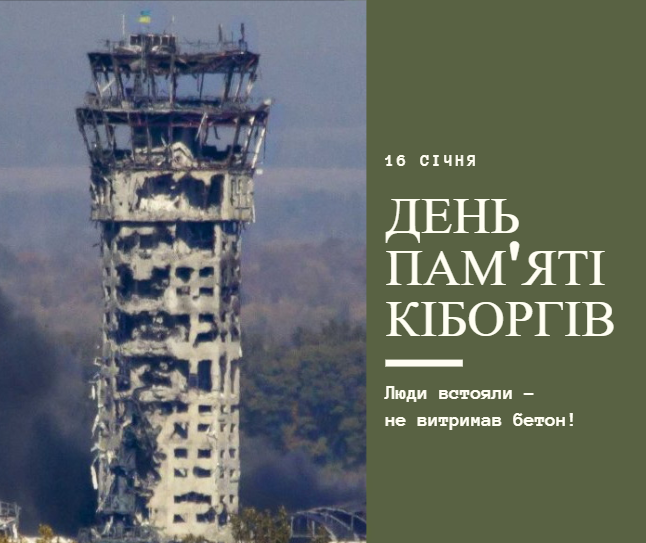
16 January Cyborg Remembrance Day (shattered airport control tower depicted)

On 16 January, Ukrainians honor the memory of the defenders of Donetsk airport. This is a semi-official day of remembrance, established on the initiative of the cyborgs themselves. Funeral and commemorative events are held on this day, including with the participation of senior government officials. However, there are no available explanations as to why such a date was chosen.

20 January is also called Remembrance Day.

Ukrposhta issued a postage stamp in honor of the "cyborgs" (22 January 2020, cat. No. 1806, face value V).Commemorative coin of the NBU with a face value of ₴10 from the series "Armed Forces of Ukraine". The coin was put into circulation on 30 January 2018.

In honor of Igor Branovytsky a youth space "Natriy" was created in Kyiv, and the street was named.

== "Cyborgs" in culture and art ==
- Full-length documentary "The Ukrainians" by Leonid Kanter and Ivan Yasny (2015)
- Full-length feature film "Cyborgs: Heroes Never Die" by Akhtem Seitablayev (2017)
- Poem "Donetsk Airport" by Vladimir Tymchuk
- Collection of interviews and photos "AD 242. History of courage, brotherhood and self-sacrifice" (compiler Irina Shtogrin)
- Novel "Airport" by Sergey Loiko
- "Cyborgs" photo gallery by Sergey Loiko decorated the first column of the "Los Angeles Times" on 28 October 2014
- Numerous photo, art and book exhibitions
- Charity calendars with photos of the military
- The image of the airport control tower, from which the defenders made observations, completely shattered by tank shots, and the slogan "Cyborgs withstood, concrete could not withstand" became the property of mass culture.
