= Bohorodychne =

Bohorodychne Богородичне
- Village
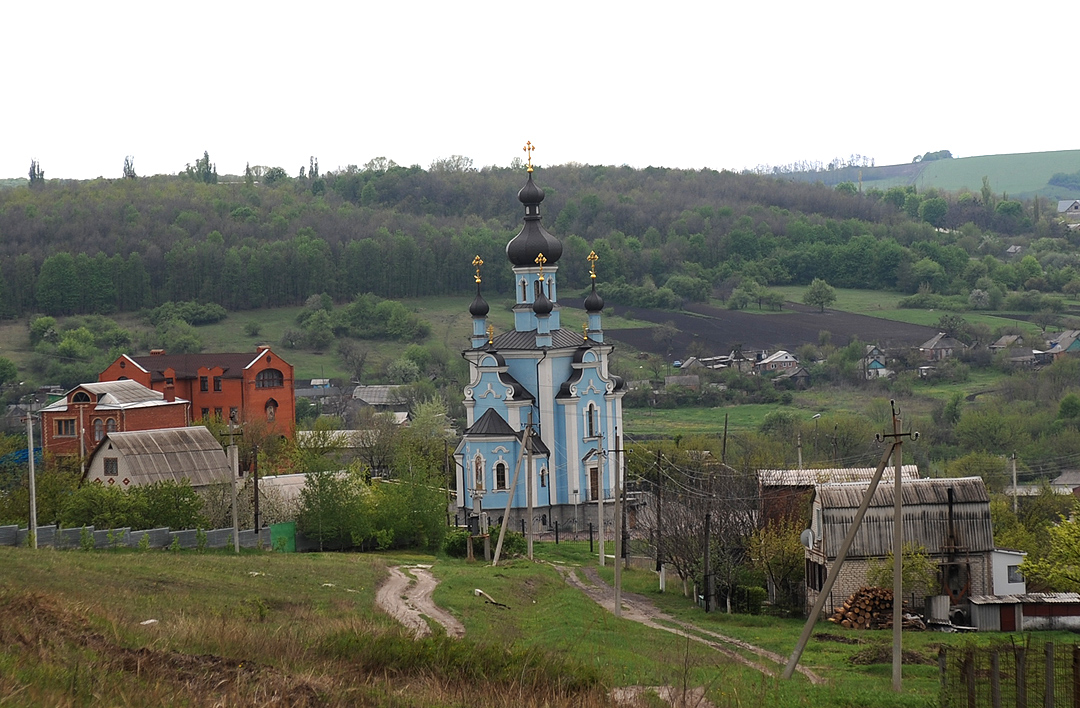
- Interactive map of Bohorodychne
- Location of Bohorodychne within Ukraine Bohorodychne (Ukraine)
- Coordinates: 49.016111°N 37.508333°E
- Country: Ukraine
- Oblast: Donetsk Oblast
- District: Kramatorsk Raion
- Founded: 1713

Area
  - Total: 2.4 km^{2} (0.93 sq mi)
- Elevation: 74 m (243 ft)

Population (2001 census)
  - Total: 794
  - Density: 330/km^{2} (860/sq mi)
- Time zone: UTC+2 (EET)
  - Summer (DST): UTC+3 (EEST)
- Postal code: 84136
- Area code: +380 626

Bohorodychne (Ukrainian: Богородичне; Russian: Богородичное, romanized: Bogordichnoye) is a village in Kramatorsk Raion (district) in Donetsk Oblast of south-eastern Ukraine, at about 120 kilometres (75 mi) north-northwest from the centre of Donetsk city, on the right bank of the Siverskyi Donets river.

== History ==
It was founded in the 17th century as a settlement near the Sviatohirsk Lavra. From December 3, 1917, it was part of the Ukrainian People's Republic and from 1920, part of the USSR. During World War II, the village was occupied by German troops from October 28, 1941 to September 5, 1943.

=== Russian invasion of Ukraine ===
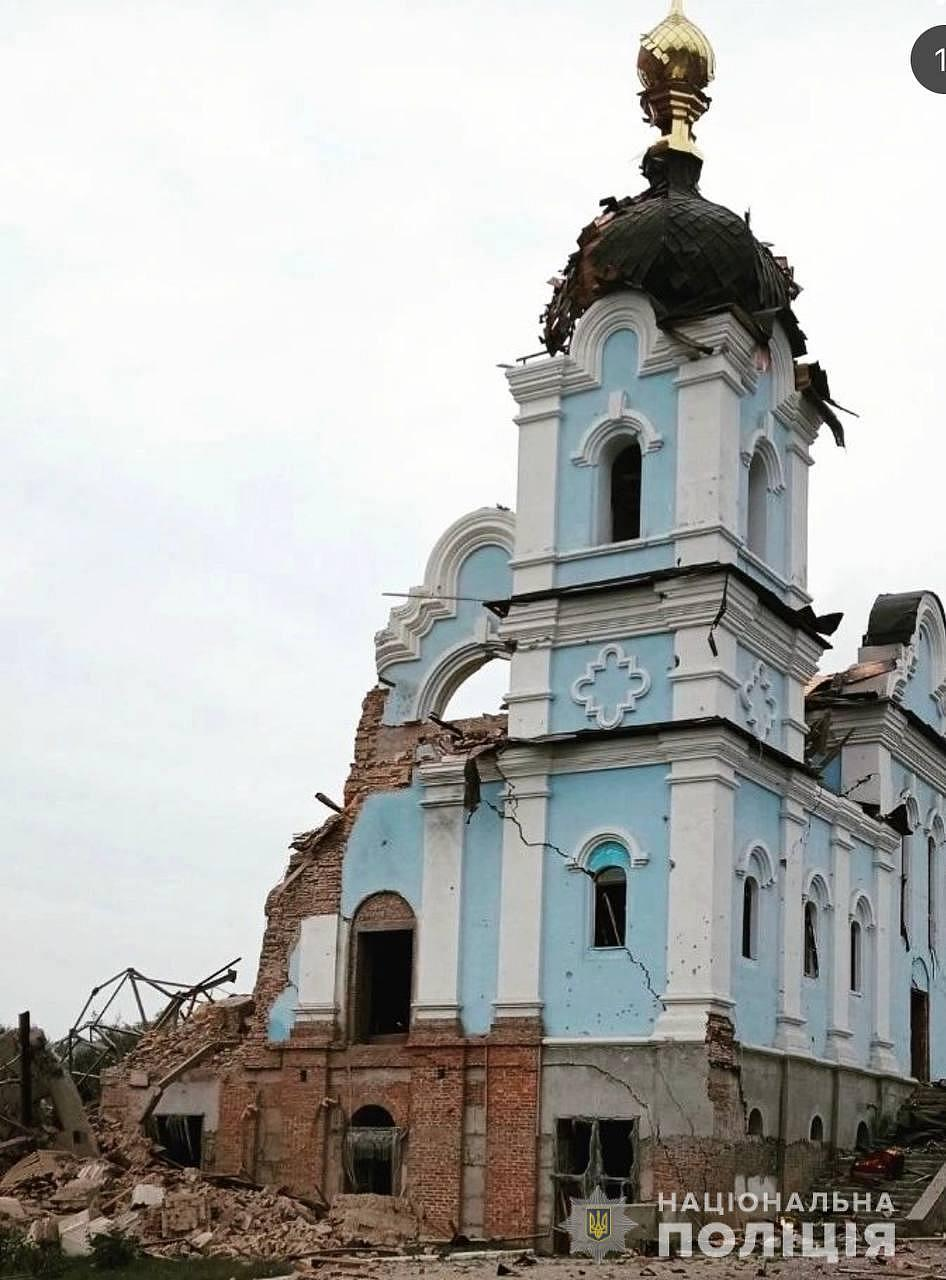
Local church destroyed by the shelling from the Russian Armed Forces

During the Russian invasion of Ukraine, the village came under attack by Russian forces in June 2022 and they occupied it on 17 August. On September 11, 2022, during the Kharkiv counteroffensive, the Armed Forces of Ukraine liberated the village, after fighting for the settlement for more than three months. The Ukrainian flag was raised over Bohorodychne by the fighters of the 81st Airmobile Brigade. Fleeing Russian troops left behind a devastation of destroyed settlement, with almost no surviving buildings, burnt military equipment, and a church completely destroyed. Tortured bodies of Ukrainian soldiers, were found decapitated, as well as dead local residents with their hands tied, in cellars, at the bottom of the pool. During the clearing of the village, the Ukrainian military discovered two local residents, 93-year-old Nina and her 60-year-old son Mykola, who managed to survive.

Before the Ukrainian recapturing of the village and the nearby city Sviatohirsk on 11 September 2022, it was believed the village had changed hands between Ukrainian and Russian forces more than 14 times.

A year later by September 2023, most of the burned equipment was removed and some streets have been completely demined. The village remains with no gas or water and no electricity. 35 people who have decided to return to their homes are being helped by volunteers.

== Architecture and scenery ==
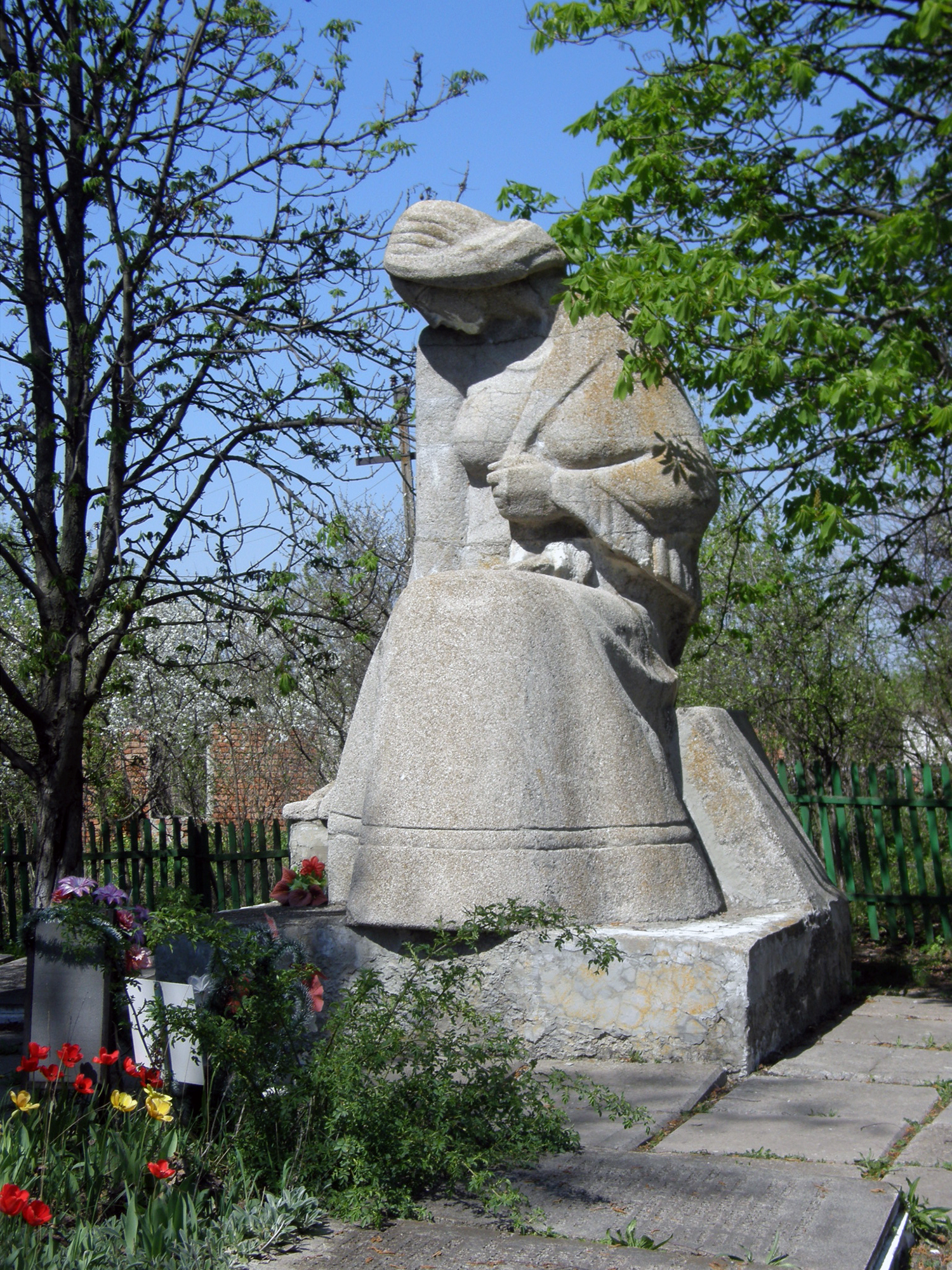
Mother of Sorrows

The village is located near the Holy Mountains, which is known as the "Switzerland of Donetsk". The forest-covered hills on the right bank of the Donets River and the pine forests on the left bank create a unique climate for the village. There is a trail about 4 kilometers long near the village, along which seeing the scenery of the Holy Mountains. In 1981, the "Mother of Sorrows" monument, designed and built by Leonid Bryn, was erected in the village. The monument is 4.5 meters high and made of granite fragments and reinforced concrete.

== Demographics ==
As of the 2001 Ukrainian census, Bohorodychne had a population of 794 inhabitants. The native languages in the settlement were as follows:

Native languages in Bohorodychne
	percent
Ukrainian	84.8%
Russian	13.4%
Armenian	0.6%
Belarusian	0.1%
others	0.1%
