= Vodiane, Pokrovsk Raion, Donetsk Oblast =

Vodiane Водяне
- Village
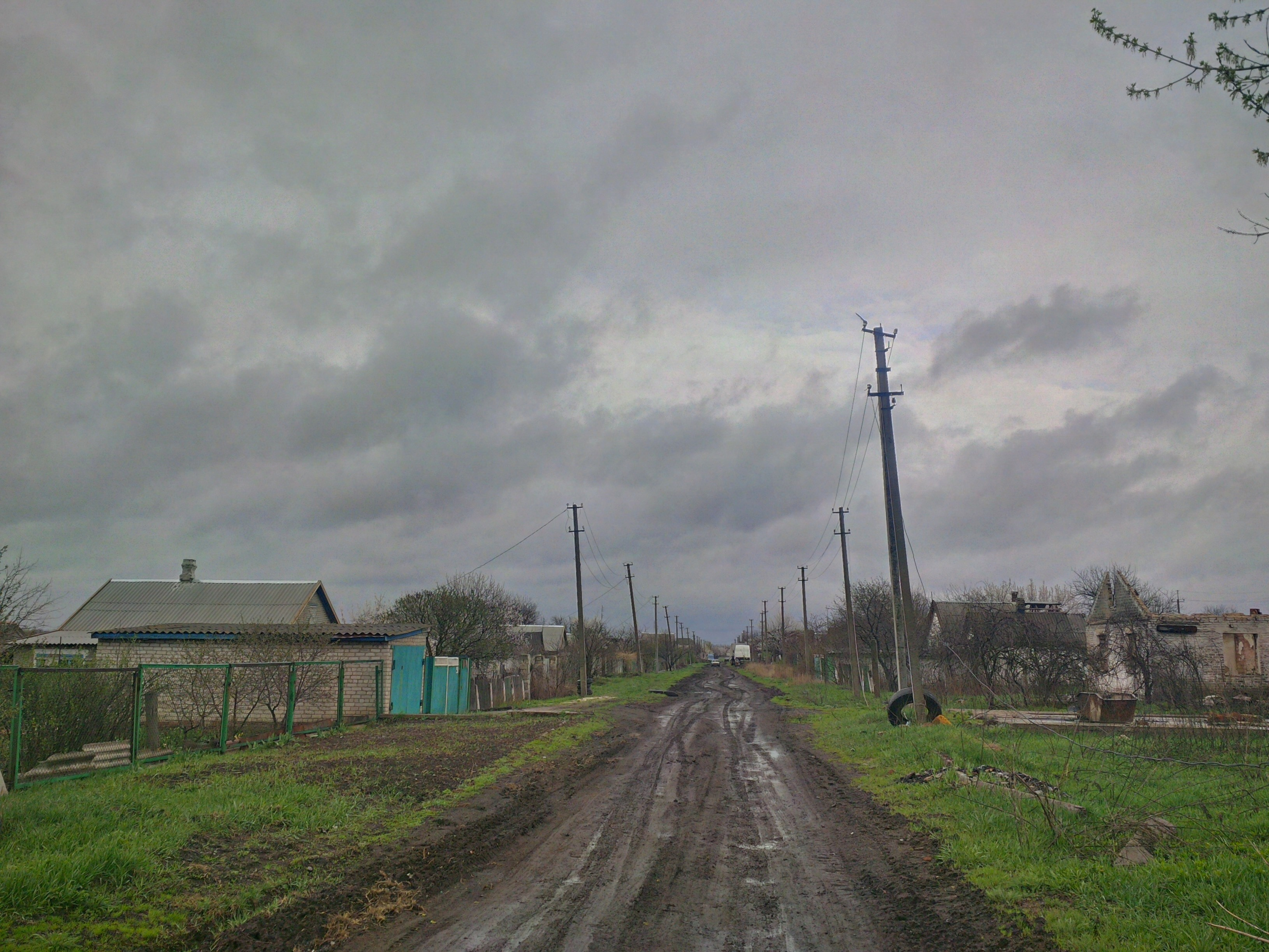

- Location of Vodiane within Ukraine Vodiane (Ukraine)
- Coordinates: 48°05′46″N 37°39′58″E
- Country: Ukraine
- Oblast: Donetsk Oblast
- Raion: Pokrovsk Raion

Area
  - Total: 5.96 km^{2} (2.30 sq mi)
- Elevation: 177 m (581 ft)

Population
  - Total: 0

Vodiane or Vodyane (Ukrainian: Водяне) is a village in Pokrovsk Raion, Donetsk Oblast, Ukraine. In 2001, the population was 319 and the elevation is 177m. Up until 2020, the village was part of Yasynuvata Raion, until it was merged into Pokrovsk Raion.

== History ==
=== War in Donbas ===
Starting in 2014, during the war in Donbas, there were hostilities in the vicinity of the village. Chapter 21 of Olena Bilozerska's book "Diary of an Illegal Soldier" is devoted to the battle for Vodiane on 19 July 2014.

=== Russian invasion of Ukraine ===
During the 2022 Russian invasion of Ukraine, Vodiane's status remained contested as skirmishes and battles commenced in the village's surrounding areas, particularly in the zone west of Avdiivka. By 3 April 2024, most of the village had been captured by Russian forces, with only the extreme western portion near Pervomaiske being still contested.

On 5 April 2024, the Russian Ministry of Defence stated that Russian forces had captured Vodiane, amid ongoing clashes near Pervomaiske. The claim could not be independently verified at the time.

== Population ==
According to the 2001 census, the population of the village was 319 people, of whom 19.75% indicated Ukrainian as their mother tongue and 80.25% as Russian.
