= Donetsk International Airport =

Airport near Donetsk, Ukraine

Donetsk Sergei Prokofiev International Airport Міжнародний аеропорт «Донецьк»

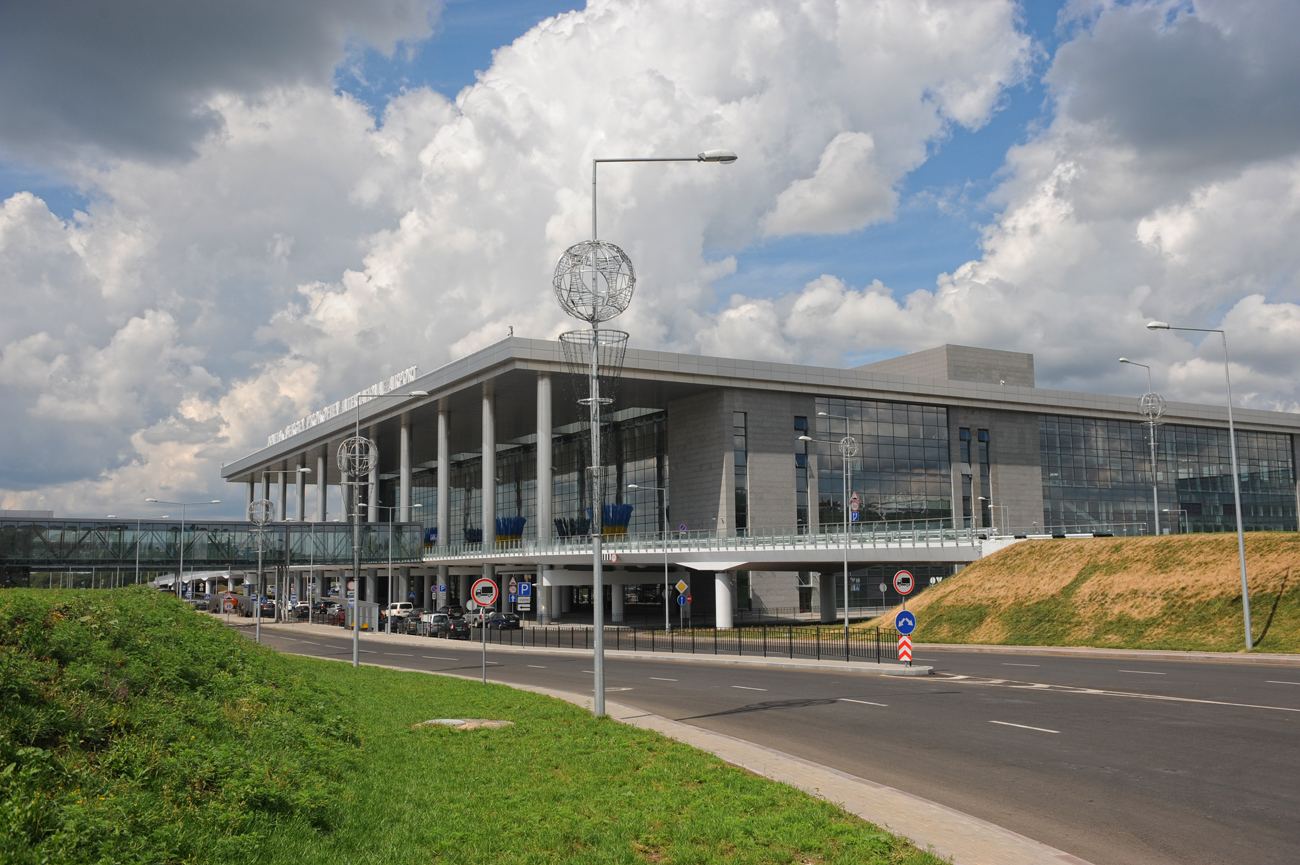
- The airport's terminal prior to the war in Donbas
- IATA: DOK; ICAO: UKCC

Summary
- Airport type: Public (currently used for military launches)
- Owner: Ukraine (de jure); Russia (de facto)
- Serves: Donetsk, Ukraine
- Elevation AMSL: 238 m (781 ft)
- Coordinates: 48°04′30″N 37°43′32″E
- Website: https://dok.aero/

Maps
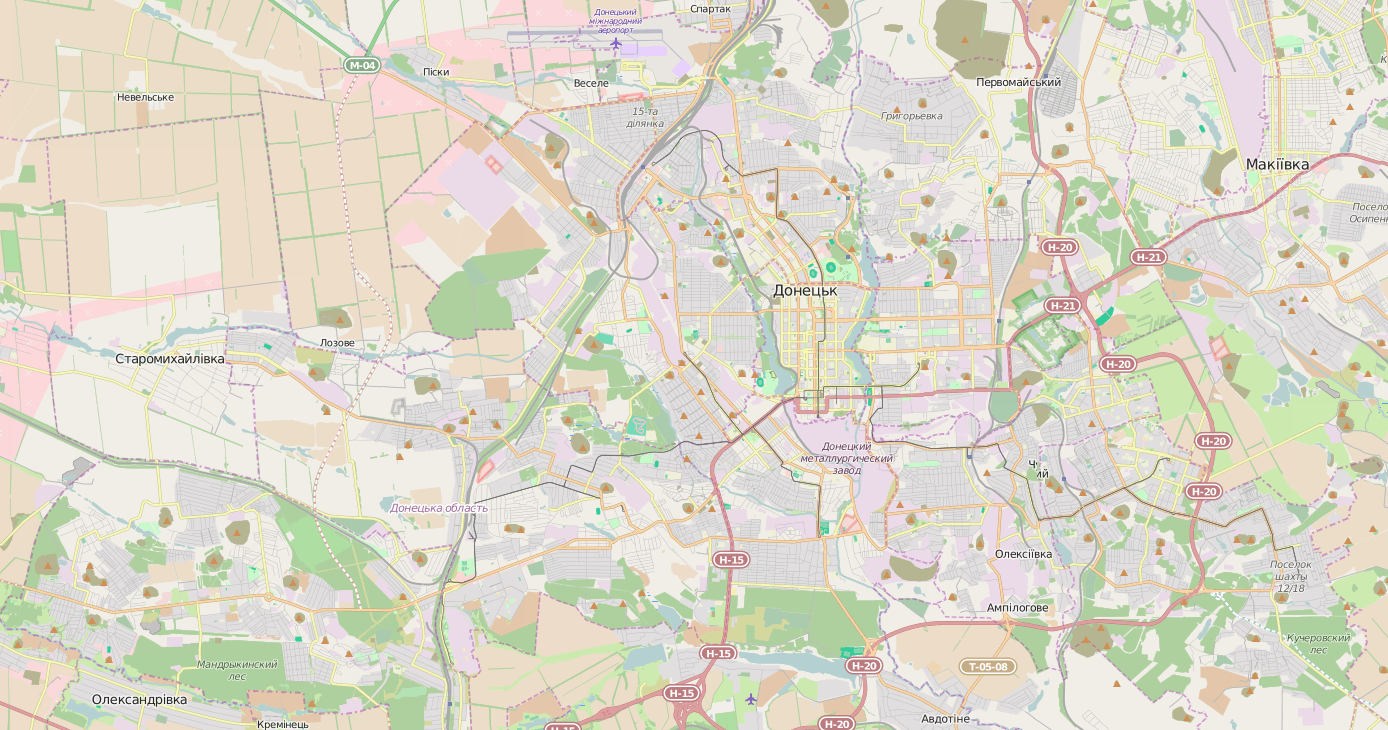
- Location in Ukraine UKCC (Donetsk Oblast) UKCC (Ukraine)
- Interactive map of Donetsk Sergei Prokofiev International Airport

Runways
Direction	Length		Surface
Direction	m	ft	Surface
08/26	4,000	13,123	Concrete

Statistics (2014)
- Passengers: ▼346,700
- Source: Ukrainian AIP at EUROCONTROL

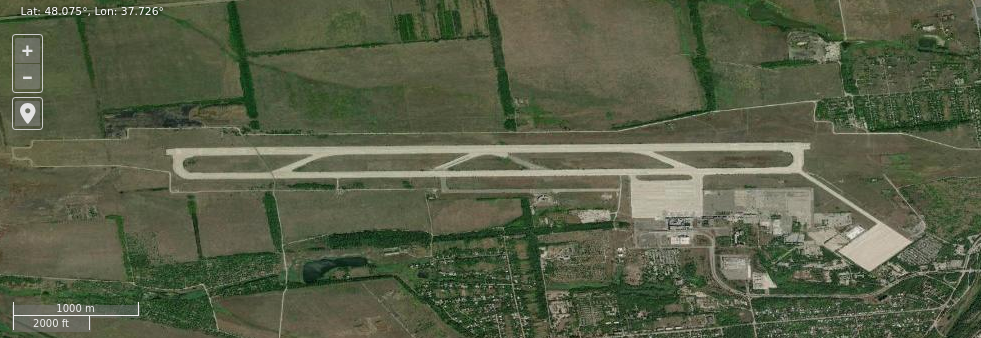
Satellite imagery of Donetsk International Airport

Donetsk Sergei Prokofiev International Airport (Note: Ukrainian: Міжнародний аеропорт «Донецьк» імені Сергія Прокоф'єва, romanized: Mizhnarodnyi aeroport "Donetsk" imeni Serhiia Prokofieva; Russian: Международный аэропорт «Донецк» имени Сергея Прокофьева, romanized: Mezhdunarodnyy aeroport "Donetsk" imeni Sergeya Prokofyeva, lit. 'International Airport "Donetsk" named after Sergei Prokofiev') (IATA: DOK, ICAO: UKCC) is a former airport located 10 km (6.2 mi) northwest of Donetsk, Ukraine, that was destroyed in 2014 during the war in Donbas. It was built in the 1940s, rebuilt in 1973, and then again from 2011 to 2012 for Euro 2012. In 2013, during its last full year of operation, it handled more than a million passengers. As of December 2025, the airport has been restored for military use.

The airport is named after twentieth-century composer Sergei Prokofiev, who was a native of the region. The former airport, after being destroyed during the 1st and 2nd Battles of Donetsk Airport, has been controlled by the Russian military since 2022.

== History ==
=== Soviet era ===
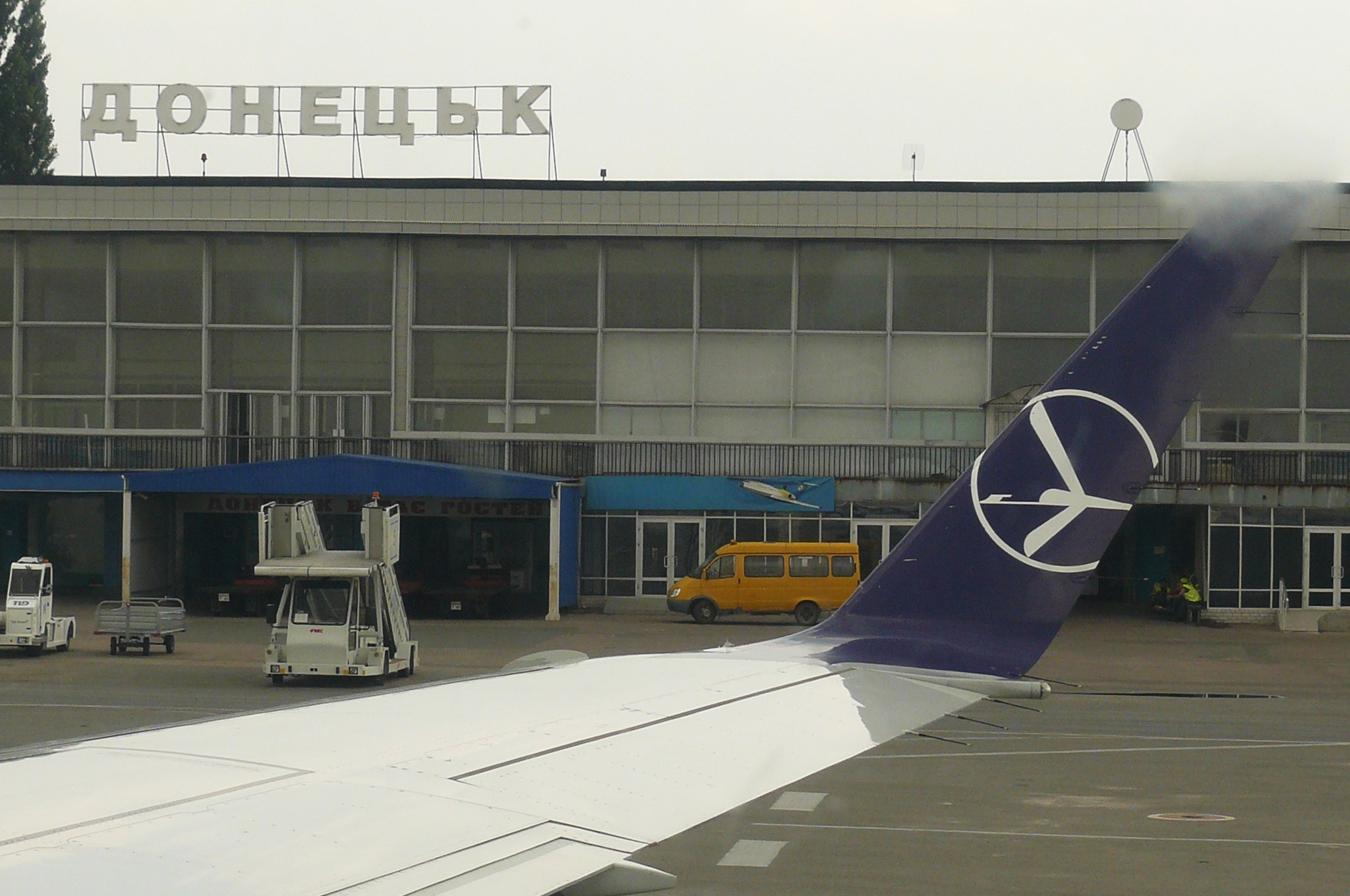
Old terminal building

The airport originates from a resolution of the Stalino City Council dated July 27, 1931, which instructed the land department and the municipal services department to find territory for the construction of a civil aviation airfield in the city of Stalino (the name of Donetsk from 1924 to 1961). In 1933, the Stalino airport was founded. In the same year, the first Aeroflot flight was organized on the route Stalino - Starobilsk. These aircraft were used for aerochemical work in the fields, sanitary transportation, and a small volume of passenger and cargo-mail transportation.

On June 23, 1941, the Council of People's Commissars approved the “Regulations on the Main Directorate of the Civil Air Fleet (Civil Air Fleet) for Wartime.” All Civil Air Fleet personnel were drafted into the Red Army. The flight technical personnel became part of the 87th Guards Separate Stalinist Civil Aviation Regiment. After the liberation of Donbas, in 1944, he began work on air transportation of passengers, cargo, and aerial chemical works.

Since 1947, the 268th Fighter Aviation Red Banner Air Defense Regiment was based at the airfield on Bell P-39 Airacobra (until 1950), Yak-15 and Yak-17 (1950-1951), MiG-15 (1951-1955), MiG aircraft -17 (1955-1962). The regiment was part of the air defense formations and carried out tasks for the air defense of Donbas. On May 21, 1962, the regiment was disbanded.

In 1952, a squadron of Li-2 heavy aircraft was organized at the airport.

In January 1957, a new air terminal designed by architect V. Solovyov, with a capacity of 100 passengers/hour, opened its doors to passengers. The rapid development of the airline occurred in the late 1960s and early 1970s, when the operation of the An-24, An-10, IL-18 aircraft began. The crews of the PANH flight squad, having perfectly mastered the use of An-2 aircraft for aerial chemical work in the Donetsk Oblast, were annually sent to help the agricultural regions of Central Asia, GDR and others, where they provided great assistance to agriculture. In 1974, the Donetsk airport reconstructed the runway, as well as radio technical means of takeoff and landing, and in 1975 a new building air terminal with a capacity of 700 passengers per hour was commissioned (designed by the architect Volodymyr Spuskaniuk).

=== Development from 2012 until 2014 ===
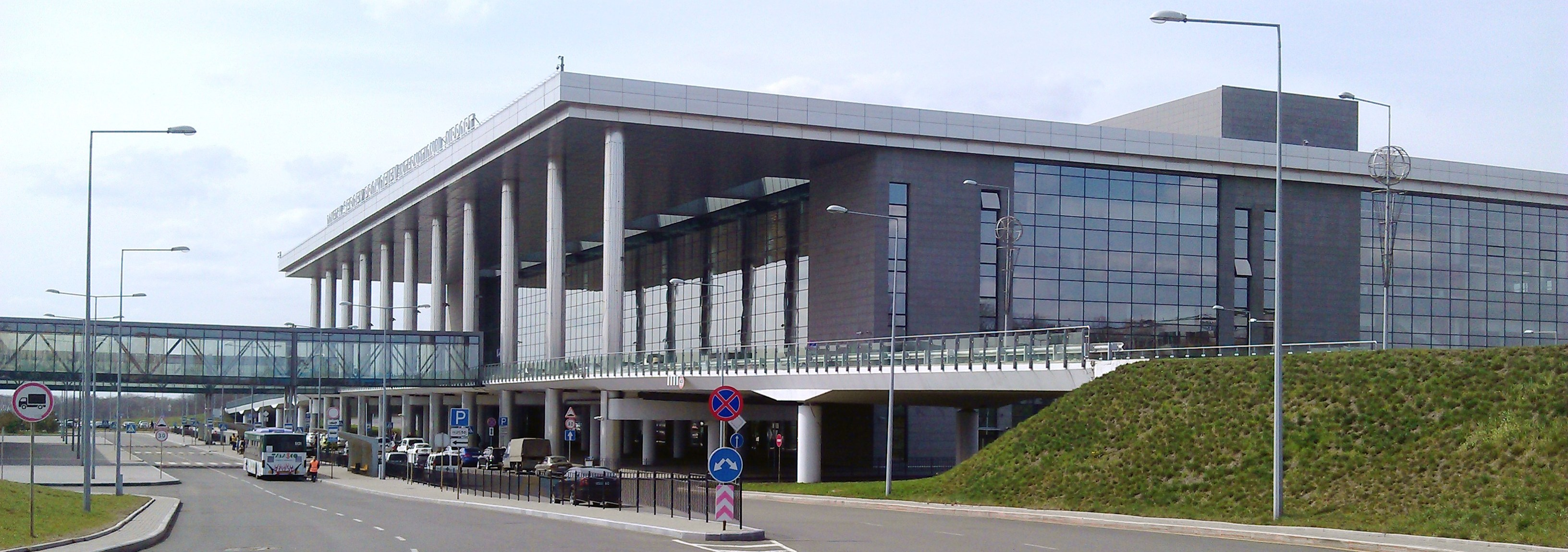
The main terminal before the war in Donbas

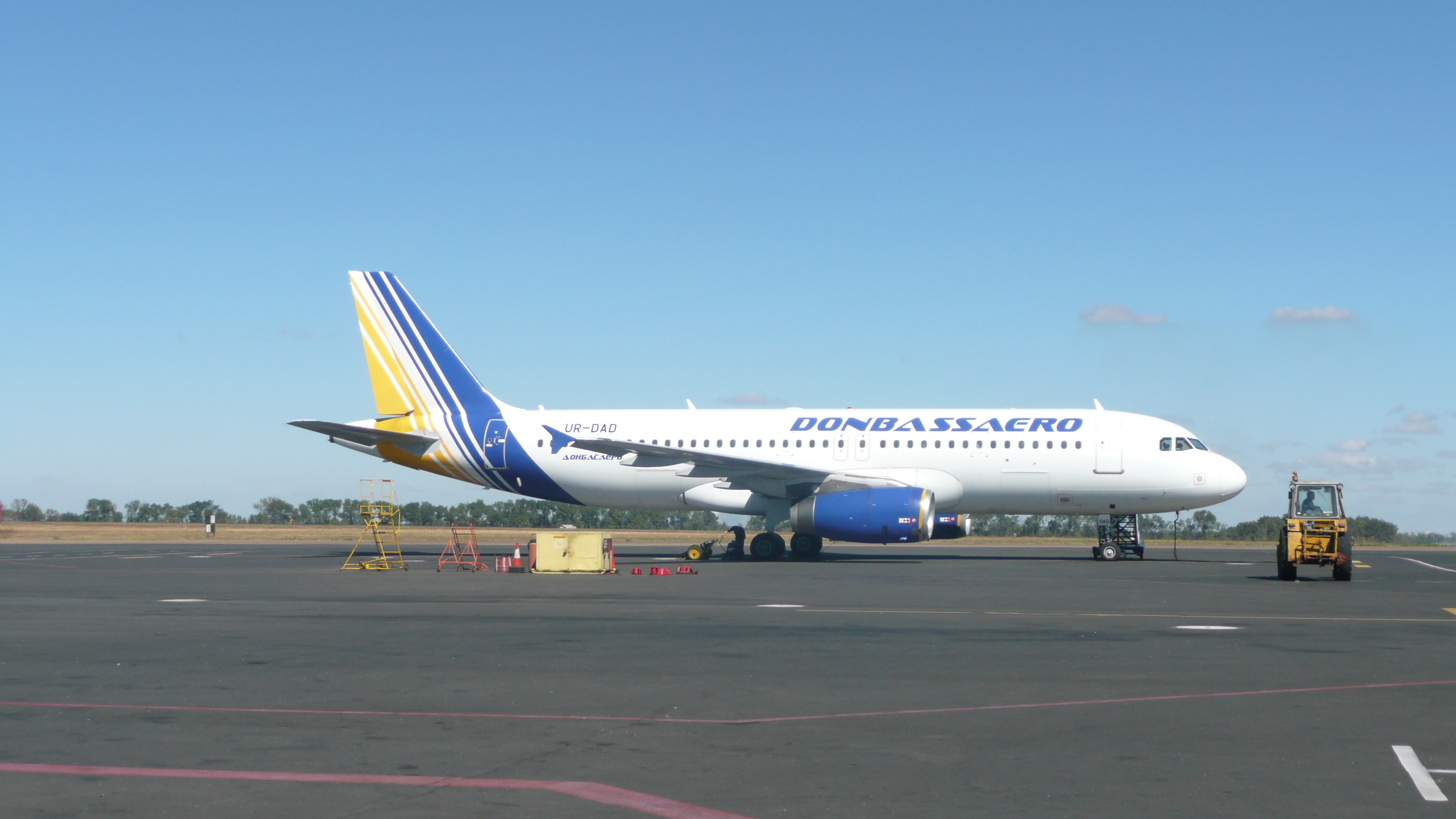
Donbassaero Airbus A320-200 at Donetsk International Airport

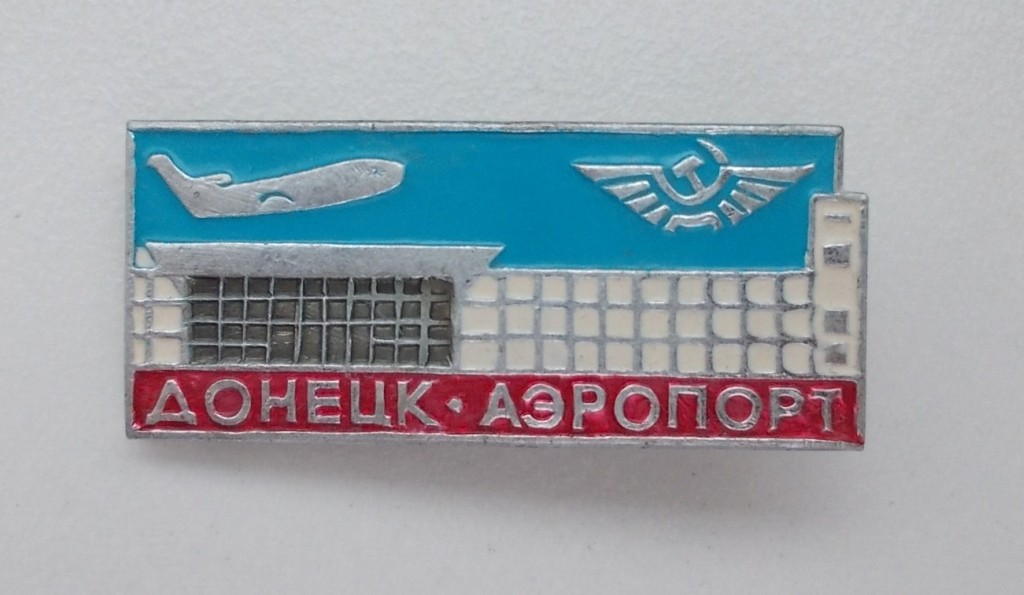
An older Donetsk Airport employee pin

Following a large infrastructure-building program in the Donetsk area for Euro 2012, in 2011 the Ukrainian construction company "Altcom" constructed a new airport terminal, developed by experts from Croatia. The Ukrainian state budget allocated $758m for the renovation project, while private investments and the local budget of Donetsk Oblast made up the remaining funds. During Euro 2012, the new terminal received international flights, with soccer fans flown in from many European capitals, including London, and was regarded as a symbol of Ukraine's progress. From August 1, 2012, it served both domestic and international flights.

The former airline Donbassaero had its head office located at the airport. It filed for bankruptcy and ceased operations in January 2013.

=== 2014–15 conflict ===
On May 26, 2014, fighters from the Donetsk People's Republic, with technical assistance from Russian mercenaries, seized the airport soon after Petro Poroshenko won the 2014 Ukrainian presidential election. In response, Ukrainian forces launched air attacks to regain control of it from the belligerents. Two civilians and 38 combatants were reported dead, and the Ukrainian military regained control of the airport. Service at the airport has not resumed since the battle.

On October 1, 2014, the belligerents attempted to retake the airport. A spokesman for what the Ukrainian government calls its anti-terrorist operation said Ukrainian forces repelled four attacks on the airport that evening. A T-64 tank was destroyed and seven Donetsk fighters were killed, Vladyslav Seleznyov told Kanal 5 TV. A reporter for Associated Press in Donetsk said on October 1 that there were indications that the government had lost control of the airport. DNR leader Alexander Zakharchenko said it was "95%" under his forces’ control. Ukrainian officials insisted the airport was still under government control as of October 2014.

Zakharchenko claimed that the rebels had taken complete control of the airport on January 17, 2015, after a series of battles with pro-government forces over the complex. One day later, it was reported that government forces claimed to have retaken almost all parts of the airport lost to the belligerents in recent weeks, after a mass operation during the night. On January 21, Ukrainian forces admitted losing control of the airport to the Donetsk People's Republic rebels.

Over the course of battles for the airport, the airport complex suffered extensive damage from constant bombardments and change of hand between pro-government and DPR forces. The main terminal buildings, with their sturdy concrete construction, served as garrisons and shelters for soldiers defending the airport grounds, and as a result the buildings were subjected to attacks and suffered extensive structural failures, most notably the collapse of the massive roof over the new terminal building's mezzanine. Similarly, the control tower was contested by opposing forces as a strategic lookout point, but eventually collapsed in January 2015 during the final leg of the Second Battle of Donetsk Airport.

Since the fighting, the ruins of the airport have been cleared of rubble, leaving behind the concrete shells of the new terminal building and adjoining parking garage.

=== Restoration ===
Satellite imagery has shown that Russian forces began to restore the airport in July 2025. Trenches that ran over the runway have been covered, and construction work is underway at the abandoned carparks, possibly in preparation for installing fuel tanks. Additionally, construction work can be seen at the destroyed hypermarket next to the airport, although it is unclear if this is military related or just for restoration purposes.

According to the OSINT group Cyberboroshno, Russia is constructing infrastructure at the site to support the deployment of Shahed-type drones, including models with jet engines, as well as Gerbera drones, which are primarily used as decoys during airstrikes. Vadym Hlushko, the group's founder, warned that Shaheds taking off from Donetsk airport could potentially be armed with artillery shells, enabling them to drop these munitions during flight before carrying out their final kamikaze strike.

In August, satellite photos revealed multi launch pads for Geran-2 drones, showing the airport is now fully functional and used for drone launches.

== Airlines and destinations ==
All civilian airline operations including Lufthansa, LOT Polish Airlines, Air Berlin, Aeroflot and flydubai were suspended due to armed conflict in May 2014, and the airport's facilities were subsequently completely destroyed.

== Statistics ==
Year	Passengers	Change on previous year
2009	488,100	Steady
2010	612,200	▲25.4%
2011	829,300	▲35.5%
2012	1,000,000	▲20.6%
2013	1,110,400	▲11.0%
2014	346,700 (closed due to the war in Donbas)	▼68.8%
2015	Steady	▼100.0%

== Accidents and incidents ==
- On January 19, 1949, a Aeroflot Ilyushin Il-12 (registration CCCP-L1381) had crashed shortly after takeoff after the right propeller oversped, in which the left engine lost power. The aircraft began losing altitude and hit the pole of a powerline and crashed into a house at ul. Krupskaya d. 105.
- On February 24, 1968, a Soviet Government Ilyushin Il-18V (registration CCCP-75560) had overrun the runway as it was departing Donetsk Airport, the airplane was damaged beyond repair and subsequently written off.
- On August 29, 1993, a Magnitogorsk Avia Antonov An-26 Cargo plane (registration RA-26549) had Landed heavily (5.8g force) to the left of the runway and struck a substation building after arriving from Khmelnytskyi Airport.
- On November 3, 1996, a group of contract killers dressed in security forces fatigues opened indiscriminate fire at the plane of prominent local businessman Yevhen Shcherban as he disembarked on the apron after a flight from Moscow. Shcherban and his wife were killed, together with an airport ground technician and the plane's flight engineer.
- On February 13, 2013, South Airlines Flight 8971 crashed when the plane overshot the runway as it attempted an emergency landing, resulting in 5 fatalities.
- On May 26, 2014, during the First Battle of Donetsk Airport, a Yakovlev Yak-40 (registration UR-MMK) owned by Constanta Airline was destroyed as a result of gunfire exchanges between the Donetsk People's Republic and the National Guard of Ukraine.
- In October 2014, during the Second Battle of Donetsk Airport, a Dassault Falcon 50 (registration UR-CCC) owned by CABI Airlines was parked in a hangar at Donetsk Airport, a photo taken in early October 2014 shows the airplane intact inside the hangar. Video footage published on October 17 showed the airplane destroyed. The precise date is unknown.

== See also ==
- Luhansk International Airport
- List of airports in Ukraine
- List of the busiest airports in Ukraine
