= Mykhailo Zabrodskyi =

Ukrainian military commander and politician

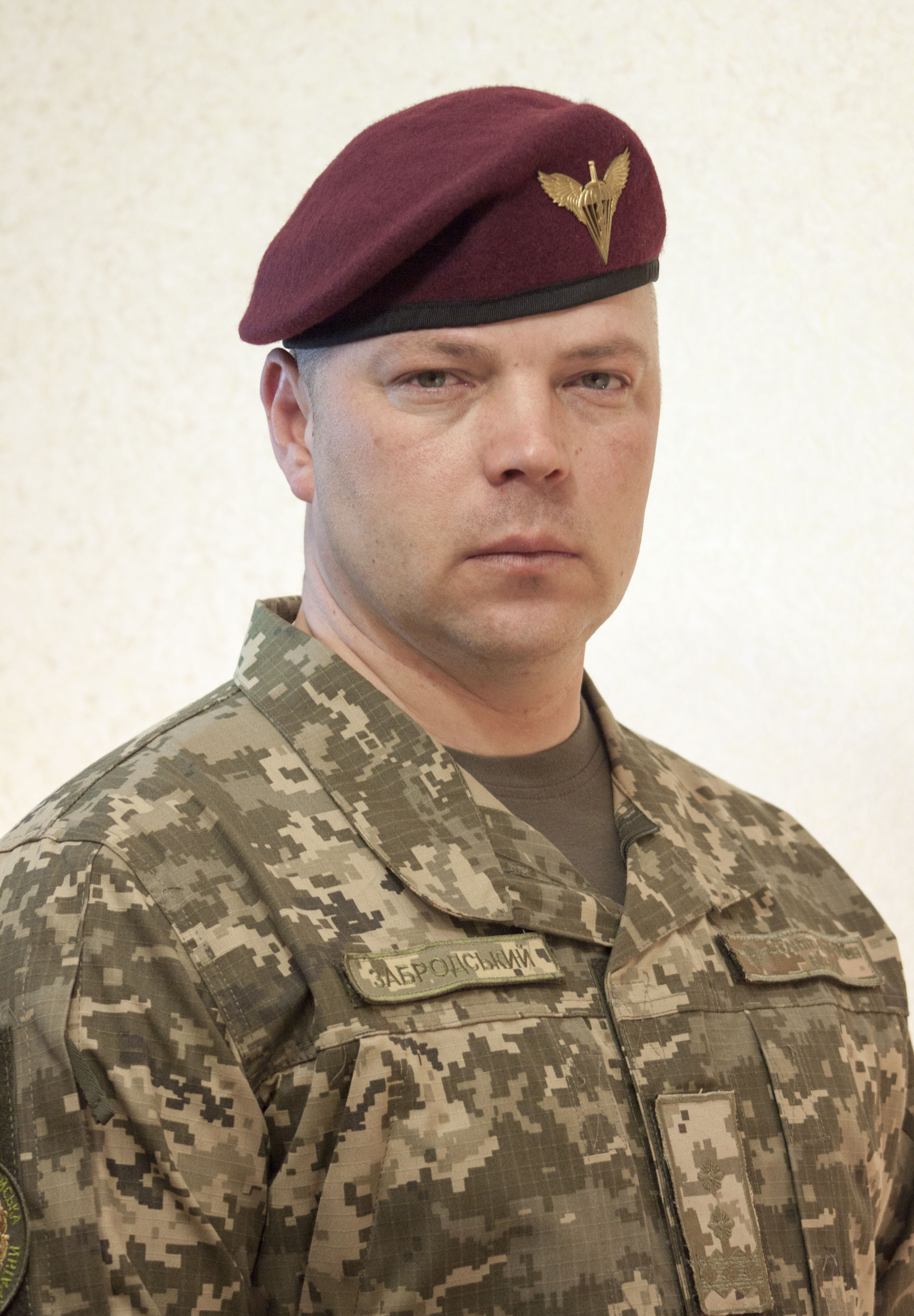
- Zabrodskyi in 2018

People's Deputy of Ukraine
- In office 29 August 2019 – 20 March 2023

Personal details
- Born: 24 January 1973 (age 53) Dnipropetrovsk, Ukrainian SSR, Soviet Union
- Education: A.F. Mozhaysky Military-Space Academy; United States Army Command and General Staff College
- Awards: Hero of Ukraine; Order of Bohdan Khmelnytsky 3d class Order of Danylo Halytsky

Military service
- Allegiance: Soviet Union (former); Russia (former); Ukraine
- Branch/service: Ukrainian Airmobile Forces
- Years of service: c. 1994–2000; c. 2000–2019
- Rank: Lieutenant general
- Commands: Deputy Commander-in-Chief of the Armed Forces of Ukraine; 95th Airmobile Brigade; Ukrainian Air Assault Forces (formerly Ukrainian Airmobile Forces)
- Battles/wars: Ukrainian contingent in Kosovo; Russo-Ukrainian War; War in Donbas; Siege of Sloviansk; Raid of the 79th Brigade; Battle of Marinka; Russian invasion of Ukraine

Mykhailo Vitaliyovych Zabrodskyi (Ukrainian: Михайло Віталійович Забродський; born 24 January 1973) is a Ukrainian politician and retired military officer. A member of the European Solidarity party, he was elected to the Verkhovna Rada (Ukraine's national parliament) in 2019, but renounced his mandate in March 2023.

Zabrodskyi is a former commander of the Ukrainian Airmobile Forces, a lieutenant general, and a Hero of Ukraine. He commanded the 95th Airmobile Brigade during the War in Donbas, during which it conducted a 470-kilometer operation 170 kilometers into Russian and separatist-held territory.

== Early life ==
Zabrodskyi was born on 24 January 1973 in Dnipropetrovsk, the son of a military officer. In 1989 graduated from high school.

== Early military career ==
From 1989 to 1994 he received military education in St. Petersburg - A.F. Mozhaysky Military-Space Academy, after which he served for five years in military service under a contract in Russia. After returning to Ukraine he began serving in the 95th Separate Airmobile Brigade as a platoon commander.

In 2005–2006, he was a student at the United States Army Command and General Staff College. His impressions of the education he received were positive:

I learned English at the U.S. Lackland Air Force Base, Texas. This is where the Defense Language Institute is, an institute owned by the U.S. Department of Defense. After that, it was the command staff of Fort Leavenworth College in Kansas. Everything that was taught – absolutely everything – became very useful. All further accomplishments of military tasks were made possible by the education obtained.

In the 2014 summer, the 95th Brigade, commanded by Zabrodsky, carried out a raid in the enemy's rear. Within two weeks, performing combat missions, Zabrodskyi's crew passed 470 km from Sloviansk to Mariupol, then along the Russian-Ukrainian border, and through Luhansk returned to Sloviansk. According to American military expert Philip A. Karber, this was the longest raid of armed formation in recent history.

According to Zabrodsky, the difference between Russian and American combat tactics is vast:

In the army of the post-Soviet model, in the center is always a combat task and everything revolves around it: people, equipment, circumstances, resources. The military model philosophy is that the task must be accomplished at all costs. The Western approach puts the person in the center and everything revolves around the individual: the task, weapons, resources. This approach works much more effectively.

On August 24, 2014, he commanded a combined parade battalion of ATO participants at Parade on Independence Day.

On 1 August 2015, he was promoted to major general. Zabrodskyi was Commander of the Landing and Assault Troops from 2015 to 2019.

In 2017 Zabrodskyi was First Deputy Head of the Anti-Terrorist Center at the Security Service of Ukraine (SBU) and Head of the Antiterrorist Operation in Donetsk Oblast and Luhansk Oblast.

On 9 November 2017, Ukrainian President Petro Poroshenko announced on his Facebook page that Zabrodskyi was appointed to lead the antiterrorist forces (ATO). At the same time, during the course of one of the largest rotations in the Anti-terrorist Operation Zone (ATO Zone), several brigades of the Air Assault Forces, including the 25th Airborne and 79th Airborne Assault, entered the collision line.

After being elected into parliament, Zabrodskyi was succeeded as commander of the Airborne Assault Troops in August 2019 by Major General Yevhen Moisiuk.

== Political career ==
On 29 September 2015 Zabrodskyi was registered as the first candidate (leading the list) for a seat in the Zhytomyr Oblast Council, affiliated with the Petro Poroshenko Bloc "Solidarity". He was elected to a five-year term as a deputy to the Seventh Convocation of the council on 25 October that year, and serves as a member of the standing committee on regulation, deputy activity, local government, legality, law enforcement, and anti-corruption activities.

In the July 2019 Ukrainian parliamentary election Zabrodskyi was placed fourth on the party list of European Solidarity (the party formerly named Petro Poroshenko Bloc "Solidarity"), and was elected to the Verkhovna Rada.

During his tenure as MVR he was the First Deputy Chairman of the parliament's National Security, Defense, and Intelligence Committee, and a member of the group for inter-parliamentary relations with the Italian Republic.

Zabrodskyi renounced his parliamentary mandate in March 2023. On 17 March 2023 Zabrodskyi's request to vote for the termination of his mandate was registered in parliament. On 20 March 2023 parliament deprived him of his mandate. According to former (European Solidarity) parliamentary faction colleague Oleksiy Honcharenko Zabrodskyi would be returning to military service.

== Later military career ==
In March 2023 Zabrodskyi was appointed Deputy to Commander-in-Chief of the Armed Forces Valerii Zaluzhny.

In February 2024, Zabrodskyi was dismissed as the Deputy Commander-in-Chief of the Armed Forces of Ukraine.

== Personal life ==
Zabrodskyi speaks English fluently.

== Awards ==
- Hero of Ukraine with the Order of the Golden Star (August 23, 2014)
- Order of Bohdan Khmelnytsky 3d class (October 21, 2014)
- Order of Danylo Halytsky (February 22, 2010)

== See also ==
- Viktor Nikoliuk, Ukrainian military officer
