= Great Raid =

Great Raid may refer to:

- Great Raid of 1322
- Great Raid of 1840
- Great Raid of 2014
- Morgan's Raid
- Raid at Cabanatuan
  - The Great Raid (film), a film about the Raid at Cabanatuan
