= 45th Air Assault Brigade =

Former Ukrainian airborne forces unit

45th Air Assault Brigade 2nd formation (2016-2020) 45th Airmobile Brigade 1st formation (1993-2003)
- Ukrainian: 45-та окрема десантно-штурмова бригада
- Second formation (current) sleeve patch
- Active: 1993–2003 (1st formation); 2016–2020 (2nd formation)
- Disbanded: 2020
- Country: Ukraine
- Branch: Ukrainian Air Assault Forces
- Garrison/HQ: Bolhrad
- Engagements: War in Donbas

Insignia
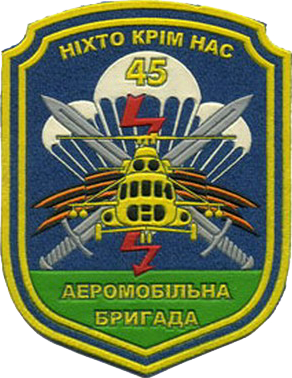
- First Formation Sleeve Patch

The 45th Air Assault Brigade was a brigade of the Ukrainian Air Assault Forces, formed twice. The brigade was first formed in 1993 from elements of the 299th Guards Airborne Regiment of the 98th Guards Airborne Division. Part of the 1st Airmobile Division, the brigade was disbanded. The brigade was reformed from an airmobile battalion in 2016. The brigade was disbanded again in 2020.

== History ==
=== First formation ===
The brigade was first formed in 1993 from elements of the 299th Guards Airborne Regiment of the 98th Guards Airborne Division. It became part of the 1st Airmobile Division at Bolhrad. The division was disbanded in 2003. The brigade became the 16th Mechanized Brigade (Military Unit Number 1533) and was then disbanded in 2006.

=== Second formation ===
In 2013, the 88th Separate Airmobile Battalion was formed as part of the 79th Airmobile Brigade. The battalion fought in the War in Donbas. On 19 October 2016, the battalion became the 45th Air Assault Brigade at Bolhrad. The brigade was entirely manned by contract servicemen and was equipped with BTR-3DA armored personnel carriers. Much of the brigade was mixed units formed from other airmobile brigades. The brigade was disbanded in 2020 due to demobilization of most of its staff.

== Structure ==
As of 2017 the brigade's structure was as follows:

- 45th Air Assault Brigade, Bolhrad
  - Headquarters & Headquarters Company
  - 1st Air Assault Battalion (BTR-3DA)
  - 2nd Air Assault Battalion (BTR-3DA)
  - 3rd Air Assault Battalion (BTR-3DA)
  - Brigade Artillery Group
    - Headquarters & Target Acquisition Battery
    - Self-propelled Artillery Battalion (2S1 Gvozdika)
    - Howitzer Artillery Battalion (2A18 D-30)
    - Rocket Artillery Battalion (BM-21 Grad)
  - Anti-Aircraft Missile Artillery Battalion
  - Tank Company
  - Reconnaissance Company
  - Engineer Company
  - Landing Support Company
  - Maintenance Company
  - Logistic Company
  - Signal Company
  - CBRN-defense Company
  - Medical Company
  - Sniper Platoon
