= 7th Rapid Response Corps =

Ukrainian Ground Forces formation

- 7-й корпус швидкого реагування
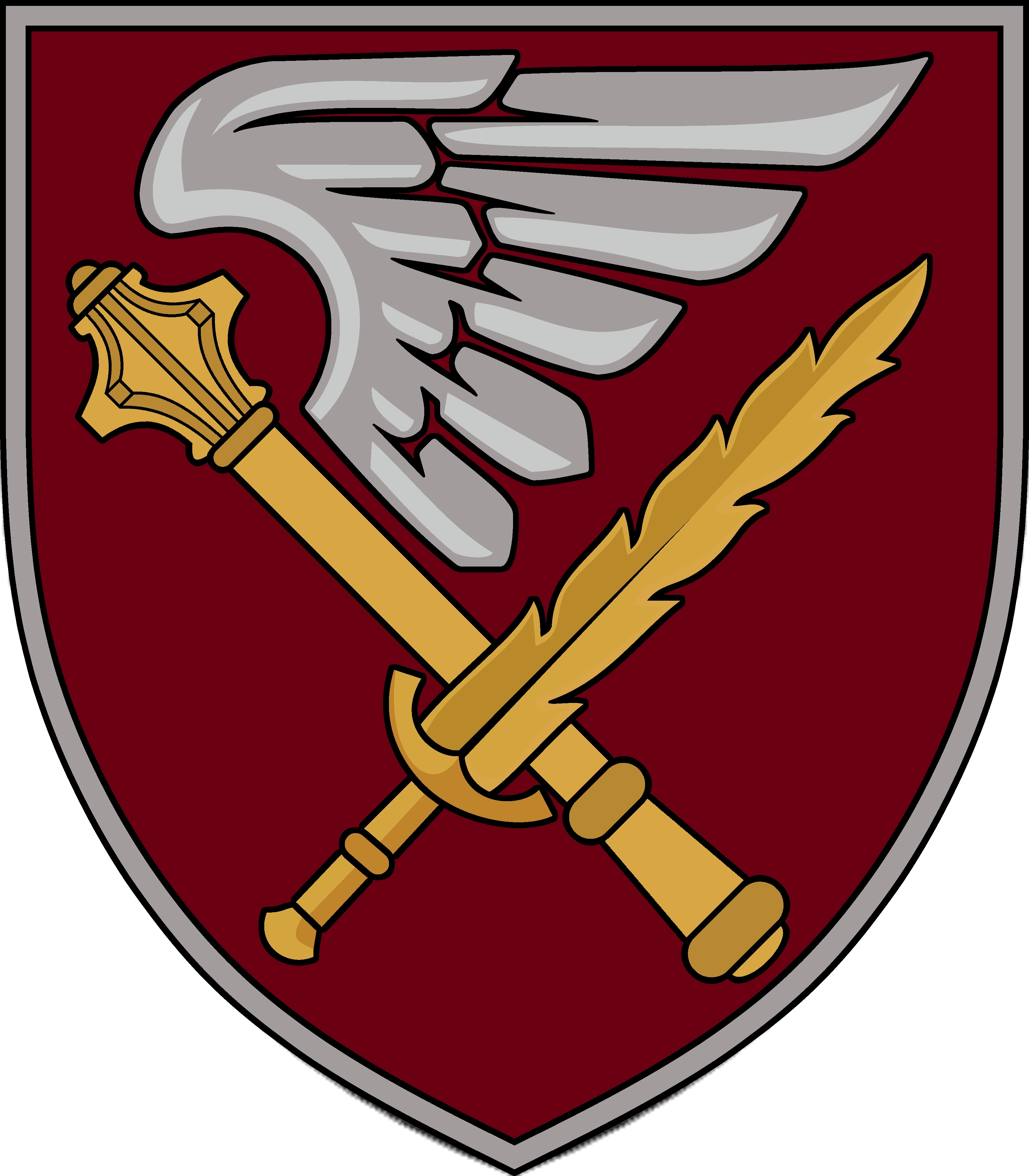
- Active: 17 July 2023 – present
- Country: Ukraine
- Allegiance: Armed Forces of Ukraine
- Branch: Ukrainian Air Assault Forces
- Size: Corps
- Part of: Command of Air Assault Troops
- Motto: Always One Step Ahead
- Engagements: Russo-Ukrainian War: Russo-Ukrainian war (2022–present); Pokrovsk offensive
- Website: 7k.mil.gov.ua

Commanders
- Current commander: Brig. Gen. Yevhen Lasiychuk

The 7th Rapid Response Corps of the Air Assault Forces of Ukraine (Ukrainian: 7-й корпус швидкого реагування), also known as 7th Air Assault Corps, is a combined arms corps of the Ukrainian Air Assault Forces.

== History ==
=== Formation and background ===
The 7th Rapid Response Corps of the Air Assault Forces was created by a directive of 17 July 2023, becoming the first corps-level formation in the history of the Air Assault Forces of the Armed Forces of Ukraine. The first unit order and the announcement of the establishment of the 7th Corps' command were timed to 8 November 2023 — the feast day of Archangel Michael, patron saint of Ukrainian paratroopers. The creation of this corps represents a strategic enhancement in Ukraine's military structure, aligning it more closely with NATO-style corps units.

The units that joined the corps already had a rich combat history, including participation in United Nations peacekeeping missions in the 1990s–2000s, combat experience in eastern Ukraine since 2014 (including the defenders of Donetsk International Airport, known as the "Cyborgs"), and combat since the start of the full-scale war in 2022.

On 5 February 2025, during the start of the corps reform of the Armed Forces of Ukraine, it became known that there was an intention to split the 7th Rapid Response Corps of the Air Assault Forces into two combat-capable corps. On 23 April 2025 it became known that part of the 7th Corps' brigades had moved into the newly created 8th Air Assault Corps, a transfer finalized in June 2025.

=== Defense of the Pokrovsk agglomeration ===
Units of the 7th Corps were reported to have been active on the Pokrovsk front. From January to June 2025 the corps was engaged in organizing the defense of the Novopavlivka sector and part of the Pokrovsk sector, preventing Russian forces from breaking through to the administrative border of Donetsk and Dnipropetrovsk oblasts. In February 2025, despite the enemy's numerical superiority, the 25th Sicheslav Brigade halted the enemy's advance toward the Pokrovsk agglomeration.

In the summer of 2025 the 7th AAF Corps took over the sector of responsibility in the Pokrovsk direction, directly defending the agglomeration comprising the cities of Pokrovsk and Myrnohrad (while part of the corps' brigades continued carrying out tasks in other sectors of the front).

That same July 2025, the corps came under the command of Hero of Ukraine Colonel (from 7 November of that year, Brigadier General) Yevhen Lasiichuk, previously commander of the 25th Separate Airborne Brigade. Immediately after his appointment he defined the corps' strategic priority: "The corps must operate through technology, through the use of innovative measures, methods and ways of conducting combat operations, and new tactical approaches."

Subsequently, the Pokrovsk–Myrnohrad agglomeration, where units within the 7th AAF Corps' sector of responsibility and neighboring units held the defense, remained one of the hottest sectors of the front by number of assaults. In August 2025, President Volodymyr Zelenskyy reported that Russia had concentrated its largest grouping — over 100,000 personnel — in the Pokrovsk direction.

On 15 August 2025, the 7th Corps' press service reported that, together with adjacent units, corps forces had cleared Pokrovsk of occupying groups and isolated saboteurs of the Russian armed formations. Throughout 2025–2026, units within the corps' sector of responsibility continued intense meeting engagements as Russian forces made mass use of small-group assault tactics, at times using light vehicles. In total, by the end of spring 2026 Ukrainian defenders had destroyed more than 20,000 enemy troops in this sector.

=== New units of the corps ===
On 21 August 2025, the Air Assault Forces Command announced that a new military unit had been created within the 7th Rapid Response Corps of the Air Assault Forces — the 147th Separate Artillery Brigade. The brigade, equipped with both domestic (Bohdana-B, Bohdana-BH) and Western artillery systems (M777, CAESAR, HIMARS from 2026), as well as drones (including mid-range strike drones), has repeatedly ranked first in combat-effectiveness ratings among the Armed Forces' artillery brigades.

The 147th Separate Artillery Brigade also developed the "Prometheus" artillery command-and-control system, which allows the online coordination of artillery crews' combat work, management of artillery employment, and tracking of ammunition expenditure.

In December 2025, the 78th Separate Air Assault Regiment was expanded into a brigade. Also in December 2025, the 132nd Separate Reconnaissance Battalion, formed in 2018, joined the 7th Rapid Response Corps of the Air Assault Forces; the unit had already distinguished itself during the de-occupation operations in Kyiv and Kharkiv oblasts, as well as in combat in the Kursk region.

Over the winter of 2025–2026, the 7th AAF Corps established its own 237th Separate Unmanned Systems Battalion.

=== "Tech Airborne" and the introduction of innovations ===
The corps positions itself as a "Tech Airborne" unit that uses cutting-edge technology to minimize risk to personnel and preserve paratroopers' lives. These innovations include unmanned systems, ground robotic platforms, R&D centers, mobile laboratories, innovative training systems, and modern strike capabilities.

In March 2026, the 7th AAF Corps became the first among Ukraine's Defense Forces to conduct combat trials of exoskeletons in logistics and at artillery combat positions.

On 23 April 2026, the 7th Corps announced the creation of its own Center for Innovation and Technology. Its stated task is to bring together the technological potential of all units and synchronize the roll-out of developments across the entire corps at once.

The 7th AAF Corps was among the first in the Armed Forces of Ukraine to introduce a khorunzhyi (color-bearer/warrant-officer) service and an institute of veteran-support advisers within its units. The khorunzhyi service carries out educational and outreach work, preserves history and culture, provides moral and psychological support, and runs lectures and cultural programs.

In late May 2026, the 7th AAF Corps announced the launch of "Marun Hub," a nationwide network of civilian–military spaces, opening the first such venue in Dnipro. The name references the paratroopers' maroon berets but is spelled as "Marun" instead of "Maroon".

== Structure ==
As of 2025 the corps structure is as follows:

- 7th Rapid Response Corps
  - Corps Headquarters
    - 87th Command & Support Battalion
  - 25th Airborne Brigade
  - 77th Airmobile Brigade
  - 78th Airborne Assault Brigade
  - 79th Air Assault Brigade
  - 81st Airmobile Brigade
  - 132nd Reconnaissance Battalion
  - 147th Artillery Brigade
  - 231st Logistics Battalion
  - 237th Unmanned Systems Battalion

== See also ==
- 8th Air Assault Corps
- 9th Army Corps
- 30th Marine Corps
