= 13th Airmobile Battalion (Ukraine) =

Ukrainian Air Assault Forces unit

- 13-й окремий десантно-штурмовий батальйон
- Sleeve patch of the Battalion
- Active: 1994–present
- Country: Ukraine
- Branch: Ukrainian Airmobile Forces
- Type: Airmobile Battalion
- Role: Take part in peacekeeping operations
- Part of: 95th Airmobile Brigade
- Garrison/HQ: А1910 Zhytomyr Zhytomyr Oblast, Ukraine
- Engagements: Operation Iraqi Freedom; War in Donbas; Siege of Sloviansk; Great Raid of 2014; Second Battle of Donetsk Airport; Battle of Debaltseve

Commanders
- Current commander: Major Oleksandr Porhun

The 13th Separate Airmobile Battalion is a formation of the Ukrainian Airmobile Forces. The Battalion is composed of fully professional soldiers. The main purpose of the Battalion is to take part in peacekeeping operations.

== History ==
The battalion was created as part of the 95th Training Center of the Airborne Forces as the 13th Separate Parachute Battalion. After 2000, it was transferred to the military townlet of Korbutivka and is renamed the 13th Separate Airmobile Battalion.

In 1994, the 13th Separate Airborne Battalion was allocated from Ukraine to participate in the international partnership "Process of planning and assessment of forces". According to the plan for achieving partnership goals, the forces and means of the Ground Forces of Ukraine allocated to participate in the III stage of the force planning and assessment process for the 13th Separate Airborne Battalion were allocated several priority goals: language training, preparation for participation in peacekeeping, study of staff of NATO procedures, achieving the necessary level of interoperability in commanding, organizing, and conducting rear support.

The personnel of the battalion served in Iraq and Kosovo (international peace support force (PMU/KFOR) – 179).

=== Great Raid of 2014 ===
The 13th Battalion, together with other units of the 95th Brigade, participated in the longest raid in modern military history through enemy rear lines. During 21 days of fighting, the paratroopers, who actually broke the way for other troops, traveled 160 kilometers through the territories captured by the militants, destroying powerful enemy fortifications on the way.

One of the most heroic episodes of the legendary raid is the Battle in Shakhtarsk Raion, where the infantrymen and artillerymen came together with the paratroopers, which made it possible to knock out the enemy and gain a foothold on the heights. After the unexpected start of massive artillery shelling from the territory of Russia and the resulting drastic change in the situation, the forces of the 13th battalion managed to lead a pontoon crossing across the Kalmius River. Before that, the paratroopers did not perform the work of sapper units in any training. They mastered their new military profession under enemy fire, and then for three days they were actually a commandant battalion that ensured order among those willing to cross the river as quickly as possible.

On the approach to Lysychansk, troops of the 13th Airmobile Battalion captured two roadblocks equipped according to all the requirements of military science. After that, they took control of the oil refinery, preventing its destruction.

=== Second Battle of Donetsk Airport ===
In January 2015, the 13th Battalion was at the point of permanent deployment in Zhytomyr, restoring combat capability. On Saturday, January 17, the "Collection" team arrived.

Two tactical groups were formed from the battalion. The fighters of the first group were immediately sent to strengthen the defense of Pisky, a village located next to Donetsk International Airport.

The second tactical group of paratroopers arrived near Donetsk in the settlement of Lastochkyne on January 23. The task of this group was to storm and seize a mine located between Avdiivka and Spartak. The mine was tactically important. Snipers and artillery correctors of the enemy worked from its buildings and territories. At 8 a.m., fighters of the 13th Battalion, together with the 1st Battalion of the 95th Brigade, went on the assault. An hour and a half later, the mine was occupied. The paratroopers held the object for ten days, later they were replaced by fighters of the 11th Separate Motorized Infantry Battalion.

The next task of the 13th battalion was to take the settlement of Spartak. They attacked in two encompassing directions, the assault lasted for several hours, but it was not possible to capture the settlement. After an unsuccessful assault attempt, the paratroopers were taken to a concentration area.

=== Battle of Debaltseve ===
When the column of the 13th Battalion was already on the march to the rear, an order came to send it to another problematic place – near Debaltseve. Right on the road, the convoy turned around and followed a new route and arrived in the Luhansk region on February 12.

The paratroopers had to ensure the exit from the semi-encirclement of the units defending Debaltseve by occupying two heights that allowed them to control the Debaltseve–Artemivsk route and the units' withdrawal route.

At night, reconnaissance patrols worked in the area of the heights, and in the morning they went to the specified boundaries. In unequipped terrain, fighters hid from shelling in the folds of the terrain, dug trenches somewhere. The militants constantly covered one height with artillery and "hail", and the other, which was closer to them, was shelled from tanks.

The paratroopers held the "Corridor of Life" for two days. Columns leaving Debaltseve came under enemy fire. During the day, Ukrainian convoys were attacked by several T-72s and BMP-2s. Several times the paratroopers directed their artillery at the enemy tanks and opened fire from anti-tank missile systems, but this did not give an effective result – the tanks were maneuvering on the ground, which did not give them the opportunity to aim at them. At night, reconnaissance paratroopers identified two new Russian T-90 tanks. Having chosen a convenient moment, the Ukrainians once took aim with an anti-tank missile one of them, but the active armor on the enemy tank was activated, and the missile flew away from the armored car without causing any damage to it. All the artillery could do was to force the enemy to change positions frequently.

In the area controlled by the 13th Airmobile Battalion, the enemy's infantry was pinned down and could not operate effectively, several Russian units were defeated. The militants did not manage to cut the road along which the Ukrainian units advanced – the exit corridor was secured. The ATO command managed to implement the plan to withdraw Ukrainian units from under the semi-encircled Debaltseve.

On February 22, 2015, the paratroopers of the 13th Separate Airmobile Battalion returned to the point of permanent deployment after completing the task. During the period of departure, from January 17 to February 22, six soldiers did not return. Another 25 remained in hospitals.

== Structure ==
- Staff company
- 3 airmobile companies
- Mortar battery
- Anti-tank missiles platoon
- AAD missiles platoon
- Heavy machine guns platoon
- Lorry trucks platoon
- Supply platoon

== Commanders ==
- Major Oleksandr Volodymyrovych Porhun
- as of May 2019, the chief of staff is Captain Andriy Petrovych Burchak.

== Losses ==
Among the fallen:

- Senior soldier Huts Serhii Serhiyovych, Vuhledar, September 4, 2014.
- Sergeant Mykola Oleksandrovych Nazarchuk, January 29, 2015, DAP.
- Soldier Pavlo Logachov, approximately March 29, 2016.
- Junior Sergeant Oleg Stepanovich Bokoch, May 12, 2018.
- Soldier Ihor Tychyna, New York, January 1, 2022.

== Traditions ==
On December 2, 2019, by the Decree of the President of Ukraine, the 13th Separate Amphibious Assault Battalion was named after the Hero of Ukraine, Colonel Taras Senyuk. On December 6, battalion commander Major Svyatoslav Zaits received the ribbon with the honorary title from the President of Ukraine.

On November 17, 2022, the 13th Separate Airborne Assault Battalion named after the Hero of Ukraine, Colonel Taras Senyuk, of the 95th Separate Airborne Assault Brigade, was awarded the honorary award "For Courage and Courage" by the decree of the President of Ukraine Volodymyr Zelenskyy.

== Deployments ==
Soldiers of the battalion have served in Iraq and Kosovo.

- Kosovo: International Kosovo Force (PMU/KFOR) – 179
