= 1st Airmobile Division =

- 1-ша аеромобільна дивізія
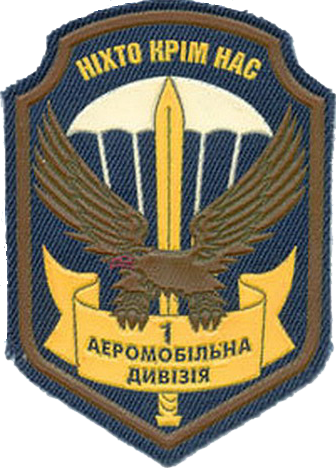
- Sleeve patch for the 1st Airmobile Division
- Active: January 1, 1993 – 2003
- Country: Ukraine
- Allegiance: Ukraine
- Branch: Ukrainian Airmobile Forces
- Type: Brigade
- Role: Airmobile
- Part of: Southern Operational Command
- Garrison/HQ: А0220 Bolhrad Ukraine
- Motto: Nobody but us
- Engagements: peacekeeping missions (Yugoslavia, Iraq)

Commanders
- Notable commanders: Col.Artur Horbenko 2002–2003 (last)

The 1st Airmobile Division (Ukrainian: 1-ша аеромобільна дивізія, romanized: 1-sha aeromobilna dyviziya) was a formation of the Ukrainian Airmobile Forces from January 1, 1993, until it was disbanded in 2003. The formation was located in Bolhrad.

== History ==
The formation of the 1st Airmobile Division was begun by an order of the Ministry of Defence on 5 May 1993 at Bolhrad from elements of the 98th Guards Airborne Division. Elements of the 217th Guards Airborne Regiment were used to form the 25th Airborne Brigade. Elements of the 299th Guards Airborne Regiment were used to form the 45th Airmobile Brigade. On 5 June 1993, soldiers of the division took an oath of allegiance to Ukraine. The formation of the division was completed on 1 December 1993. Between May and July 2002 the 25th Airborne Brigade moved to the village of Hvardiiske, Novomoskovsk Raion. The division disbanded in 2003 as part of the Ukrainian military reform.

== Structure 2001 ==
The Structure of the division on January 1, 2001:

- 25th Airborne Brigade – Bolhrad
- 45th Airmobile Brigade – Bolhrad
- 27th Mechanized Brigade – Bilhorod-Dnistrovskyi
- 91st Artillery Regiment – Veseliy Kut
- 5th Separate Anti-Tank Battalion – Bolhrad
- 615th Separate Anti-Aircraft Battalion – Bolhrad
- 32nd Separate Signal Battalion – Bolhrad
- 95th Separate Combat Engineer Battalion – Bolhrad
- 857th Separate Combat Service Support Battalion – Bolhrad
- 356th Separate Support Battalion – Bolhrad
- 160th Separate Maintenance Battalion – Bolhrad

== Commanders ==
- Major General Oleh Babich (1993–1998)
- Major General – Shamil Kuliev – (2001)
- Colonel Artur Horbenko (2002–2003)
