= 147th Artillery Brigade =

Ukrainian Ground Forces unit

- 147-ма окрема артилерійська бригада
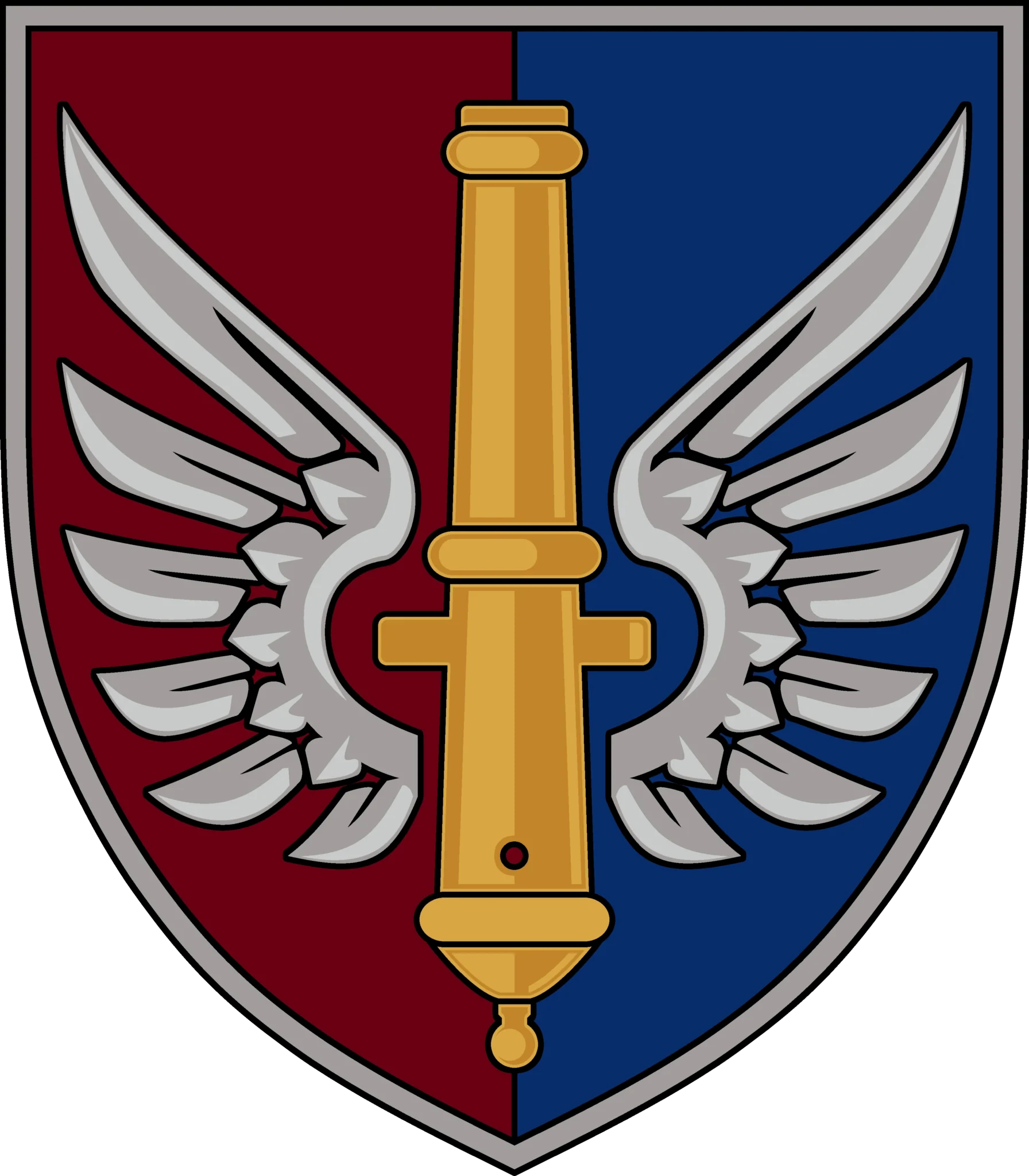
- Insignia of the brigade
- Active: July 16, 2025 – present
- Country: Ukraine
- Branch: Ukrainian Air Assault Forces
- Type: Rocket and Artillery Forces
- Role: Artillery
- Size: 1,500 - 10,000
- Garrison/HQ: Kamianske, Dnipropetrovsk Oblast
- Motto: Flame Of The Unconquered
- Engagements: Russo-Ukrainian War
- Website: 147dshv.mil.gov.ua

Commanders
- Current commander: Col. Victor Dovhal

The 147th Separate Artillery Brigade (MUN А5060, Ukrainian: 147-ма окрема артилерійська бригада) is a brigade of the Ukrainian Air Assault Forces.

== History ==
147th Separate Artillery Brigade is a military unit of the Ukrainian Air Assault Forces, and currently under the command of 7th Rapid Response Corps. The unit is based in Kamianske, Dnipropetrovsk Oblast.

== Structure ==
As of 2025, the brigade's structure was as following:

- 147th Separate Artillery Brigade
  - Headquarters & Headquarters Company
  - 1st Artillery Battalion
  - 2nd Artillery Battalion
  - 3rd Artillery Battalion
  - 4th Artillery Battalion
  - Artillery Reconnaissance Battalion
  - Engineer Company
  - Maintenance Company
  - Logistic Company
  - Signal Company
  - Radar Company
  - Medical Company
  - CBRN Protection Company
