= 135th Headquarters Battalion (Ukraine) =

135th Separate Headquarters Battalion
- 135-й окремий батальйон управління
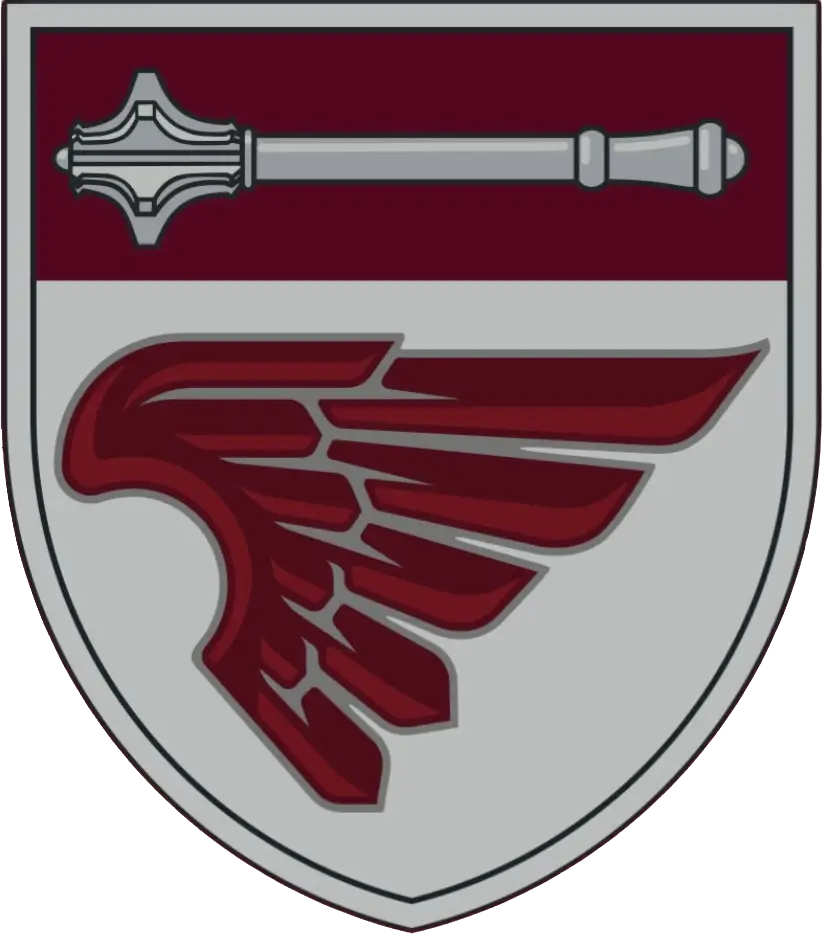
- Battalion Insignia
- Active: 2015-present
- Country: Ukraine
- Branch: Ukrainian Air Assault Forces
- Type: Battalion
- Role: Garrison Protection
- Size: ~100 personnel
- Part of: Ukrainian Air Assault Forces
- Garrison/HQ: Zhytomyr
- Mottos: "Mobility, protection, reliability"
- Engagements: Russo-Ukrainian War: War in Donbass; Russian Invasion of Ukraine; Peacekeeping operations: Kosovo Force; UNSIM; UNAMI; UNAMIL

Commanders
- Current commander: Vadym Kinzerskyi

Insignia
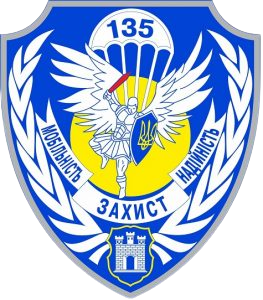
- Former Insignia

135th Separate Headquarters Battalion is a battalion of the Ukrainian Air Assault Forces established in 2015 on the basis of the 3rd Separate Field Communication Nodes and is tasked with protection and guarding of the military installations of the Air Assault Forces. In addition to the Russo-Ukrainian war, the battalion has seen action in multiple peacekeeping operations.

== History ==
The unit was officially established on March 29, 2015, by the reformation of the 3rd Separate Field Communication Nodes into the 135th Separate Command and Control Battalion of the Ukrainian Air Assault Forces. with its establishment process being completed on May 29, 2015. It was deployed in July 2015 to take part in the War in Donbass on the territory of ATO zone to protect and safeguard the headquarters of other units and military installations. Before the start of the full-scale Russian invasion of Ukraine, the battalion's strength was 94 servicemen deployed throughout the front, moreover nine personnel were deployed for peacekeeping operations in Kosovo, Sierra Leone, Iraq, and Liberia.

In 2019, the unit was recognized as the best battalion of the Ukrainian Air Assault Forces.

== Structure ==
- Automobile and Vehicle Company
- Engineering Unit
- Sapper Platoon

== Commanders ==
- Lieutenant Colonel Vadym Kinzerskyi
