= 78th Airborne Assault Brigade =

78th Airborne Assault Brigade 78th Special Forces Regiment (2022-24)
- 78-а окрема десантно-штурмова бригада «Герць»
- Active: 2022 – present
- Country: Ukraine
- Allegiance: Armed Forces of Ukraine
- Branch: Ukrainian Air Assault Forces
- Role: Air Assault
- Size: Brigade
- Part of: 7th Air Assault Corps
- Nickname: Hertz brigade
- Engagements: Russo-Ukrainian War: Full scale invasion; 2023 Ukrainian counteroffensive
- Decorations: For Courage and Bravery
- Website: 78dshv.mil.gov.ua

Commanders
- Current commander: Lt. Col. Vladislav Tsiba

Insignia
- Flag

- Combat Patch

Two brigade soldiers during training

The 78th Separate Airborne Assault Brigade Hertz (MUN A7788) is a Brigade of the Ukrainian Air Assault Forces established in 2022 during the Russo-Ukrainian war and has seen intensive combat actions, especially in Kyiv, Zaporizhzhia and Donetsk Oblasts. It is under the command of the 7th Air Assault Corps.

== History ==
The unit was established in 2022 after the 2022 Russian Invasion of Ukraine under the command of the GUR, and took part in the Defense of Kyiv. Then during the Battle of Enerhodar, the unit participated in an amphibious assault to liberate the Zaporizhzhia Nuclear Power Plant but was unsuccessful in achieving its objectives.

The regiment's personnel then underwent a five-week long military training course. The regiment saw combat during the Battle of Bakhmut during which a soldier of the regiment (Denys Pryshchep) was killed by a mine explosion. The regiment took part in the 2023 Ukrainian counteroffensive starting from June 2023. During the counteroffensive it saw combat in the village of Mala Tokmachka with a soldier of the regiment (Oleksandr Petrovych Kapizh) being killed in action on 20 June 2023, the commander of ATGM unit (Samanyuk Yury Yuriyovych) being killed on 25 June 2023 and another soldier (Oleksandr Serhiyevich Bortnik) being killed on 2 July 2023, the fighting continued with two more soldiers (Prokopenko Vadym Sergeyevich and Dmytro Vitalyovich Lysenko) being killed on 8 July 2023. Then, it took part in the battle for Robotyne as a part of the counteroffensive with two soldiers of the regiment (Yaroslav Vyacheslavovych Mamuliev and Andrii Anatoliyovych Lyuts) being killed in combat on 26 July 2023. Then it took part in the offensive towards Verbove with four soldiers of the regiment being killed in action (Ihor Shevchuk on 11 October 2023, Serhii Dmytrovych Pavlichenko on 18 November 2023, Ihor Olegovich on 7 December 2023 and Ivanov Volodymyr Petrovych on 11 December 2023). Anton Drobovych also joined the regiment in 2023.

With the resumption of hostilities in Robotyne, a soldier of the regiment (Kasiyan Vasyl Vasyliovych) was killed in action on 20 January 2024. Then, the regiment was deployed to Donetsk Oblast and saw heavy combat, two soldiers of the regiment (Oleksandr Kozharko and Ivan Volodymyrovych Shadursky) were killed on 14 March 2024. The regiment took part in engagements near Tonenke and on March 20, 2024, while performing a combat mission an officer of the regiment, a public figure and the commander of AKS Assault Company (Oleksandr Serdyukov Serdyukov) was killed in action while saving his comrades. Them it also saw combat action in Netailove with a soldier (Roman Anatoliyovych Kolisnichenko) being killed in action on 6 April 2024. On 17 April 2024, another soldier (Oleksandr Kuharchuk) was killed in Donetsk Oblast. The unit also participated in engagements near Kurakhove with two soldiers (Oleksandr Kuharchuk and Dmytro Viktorovych Bozhko) being killed on April 17, 2024. Another soldier (Livach Rostislav) was killed in Donetsk Oblast on 6 June 2024. The unit was also engaged in the Battle of Bakhmut and on 11 June 2024, a female soldier of the regiment (Ryazantseva Oleksandra Yuriivna) was killed near Bakhmut.

On 7 November 2025 the Regiment received the honorary award For Courage and Bravery from president Volodymyr Zelenskyy.

Then in December of the same year the regiment was expanded to a brigade, becoming the 78th Airborne Assault Brigade.

== Structure ==
The regiment is composed of the following subunits.

- 1st Airborne Assault Battalion
- 2nd Airborne Assault Battalion
- Fire Support Company
  - ATGM Platoon
- Avanguard Assault Squadron

== Commanders ==
- Vyacheslav Ponamarenko (2022-)

== Equipment ==
- H10 Poseidon UAVs
- DAF motor vehicles
- DAF Trucks
- Foden Trucks
