= Yevhen Moisiuk =

Ukrainian general (born 1979)

- Євген Мойсюк
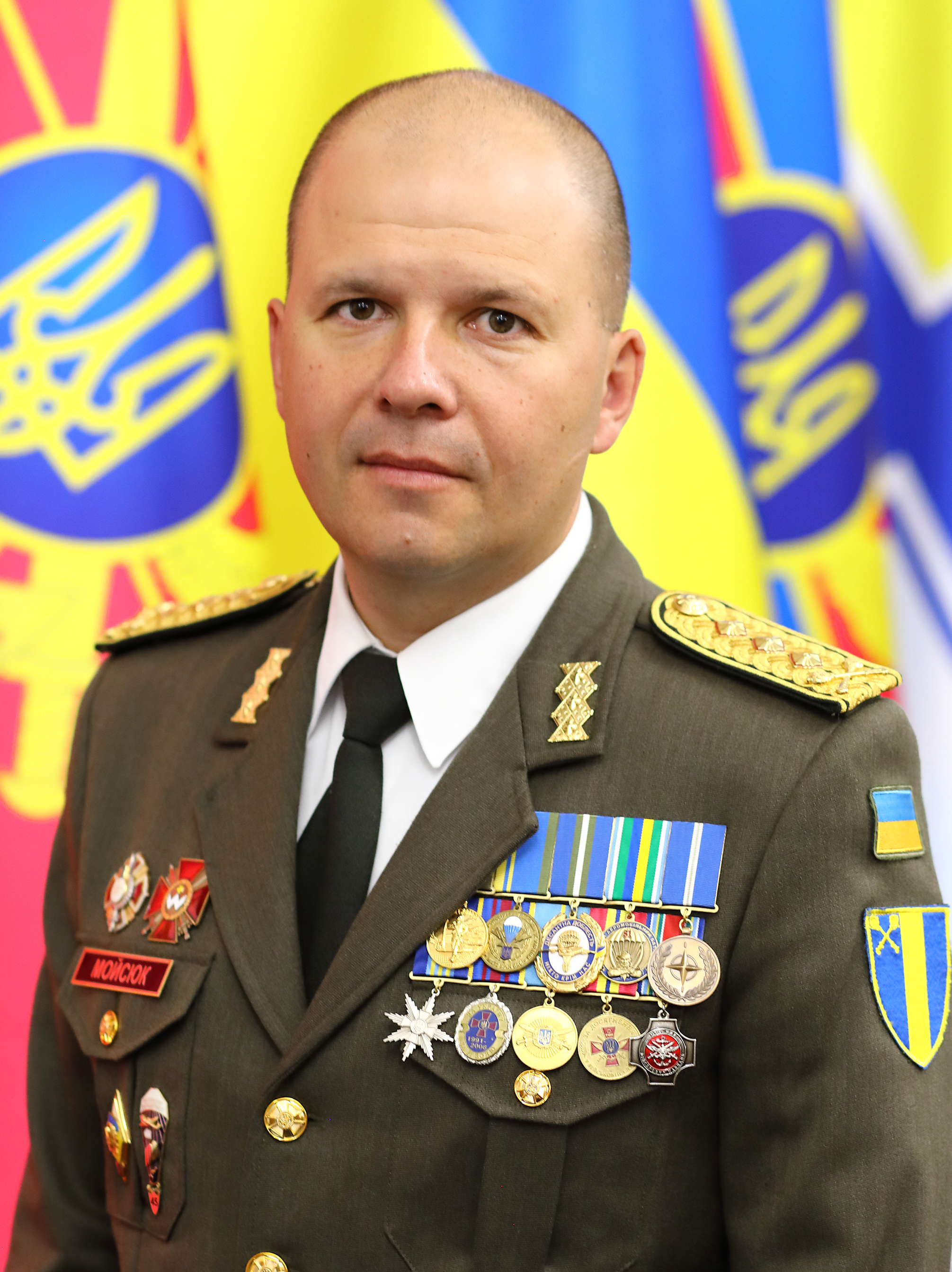
- Official portrait, 2021

Deputy Minister of Defence of Ukraine
- Incumbent
- Assumed office 7 February 2025
- President: Volodymyr Zelenskyy
- Prime Minister: Denys Shmyhal

Personal details
- Born: 7 October 1979 (age 46) Chernovtsy, Ukrainian SSR, Soviet Union
- Education: Ivan Chernyakhovsky National Defense University of Ukraine, Odesa Military Academy
- Awards: Cross of Military Merit (Ukraine); Order of Bohdan Khmelnytsky 2d class Order of Bohdan Khmelnytsky 3d class Order of Danylo Halytsky

Military service
- Allegiance: Ukraine
- Branch/service: Ukrainian Air Assault Forces
- Years of service: 2000–present
- Rank: Lieutenant general
- Commands: Deputy Minister of Defence of Ukraine; Deputy Commander-in-Chief of the Armed Forces of Ukraine; Commander of the Ukrainian Air Assault Forces; Deputy Commander of the Ukrainian Air Assault Forces; Commander of the 81st Airmobile Brigade; 25th Airborne Brigade (Ukraine)
- Battles/wars: Kosovo Force; Iraq War; Operation Iraqi Freedom; Russo-Ukrainian War; War in Donbas; Russian invasion of Ukraine

Yevhen Heorhiyovych Moisiuk (Ukrainian: Євген Георгійович Мойсюк; (Note: Sometimes transliterated as Moysyuk in English.) born 7 October 1979) is a Ukrainian three-star general, serving as the deputy minister of defense of Ukraine since 7 February 2025.

He served as the deputy commander-in-chief of the Armed Forces of Ukraine from 29 July 2021 to 11 February 2024.

== Early life and education ==
Moisiuk was born in the city of Chernovtsy, Ukrainian SSR on 7 October 1979. He graduated from the airmobile faculty of the Odessa Military Academy in 2000.

== Career ==
From 2000 to 2004, Moisiuk commanded a platoon and later a company in the 25th Airborne Brigade. From 2004 to 2005, he served as part of the Ukrainian contingent in Iraq. From 2008 to 2009, he served as part of Kosovo Force.

In 2009, he entered the Ivan Chernyakhovsky National Defense University of Ukraine from which he graduated in 2011.

=== Russo-Ukrainian War ===
At the outbreak of the Russo-Ukrainian War, in March 2014, he commanded a detachment of the 25th Airborne Brigade, which advanced to the Russian-Ukrainian border. On 16 March, a column of the detachment in the Volnovasky district, near the village of Anatolia, reportedly fired upon pro-Russian activists who were obstructing the movement of the convoy to the border, without any conclusive outcome. The column was forced to spend the night in field conditions. The camp of the detachment was set up in a field, on the slope of a stream, in snowy weather. The next day, after negotiations with pro-Russian activists with the participation of local officials, the convoy was permitted to continue its movement in the direction of the Karan railway station.

From 3 December 2014, he commanded the defense of Donetsk Airport until the premises of the building were fully destroyed. He then commanded the withdrawal of Ukrainian forces to Pisky.

On 21 September 2019, he was appointed the commander of the Ukrainian Air Assault Forces. On 21 July 2021, he was dismissed from the post.

However, on 29 July 2021, he was appointed as the Deputy Commander-in-Chief of the Armed Forces of Ukraine. On 11 February 2024, he was dismissed the position.

On 13 February 2024, he was appointed the special commissioner for implementation of security guarantees. On 7 February 2025, he was dismissed from the position.

On 7 February 2025, he was appointed as the deputy minister of defense of Ukraine.

== Military ranks ==
- Major general (5 December 2018)
- Lieutenant general (5 December 2019)

== Awards ==
- Order of Bohdan Khmelnytsky 3d class (14 August 2014)
- Order of Bohdan Khmelnytsky 2d class (10 October 2015)
- Order of Danylo Halytsky (2 December 2021)
- Cross of Military Merit (6 May 2022)
