= Ukrainian Air Assault Forces =

Branch of the Ukrainian military

- Десантно-штурмові війська України
- Emblem of the Ukrainian Air Assault Forces
- Founded: 1992; 34 years ago
- Country: Ukraine
- Type: Rapid reaction force Airborne forces
- Size: 35,000 (2024)
- Part of: Armed Forces of Ukraine
- Headquarters: Zhytomyr
- Patron: Saint Michael
- Mottos: Завжди перші! (Always first!)
- Color of beret: Maroon
- Anniversaries: Air Assault Forces Day (8 November)
- Engagements: Kosovo Force (KFOR); Iraq War; Ukrainian involvement in the Iraq War; Russo-Ukraine War; Annexation of Crimea by the Russian Federation; War in Donbas; Russian invasion of Ukraine

Commanders
- Current commander: Brigadier General Oleh Apostol

Insignia
- Flag

- Garrison color

- Shoulder sleeve insignia

- Beret insignia

The Air Assault Forces of Ukraine (abbr. AAFU; Ukrainian: Десантно-штурмові війська України, romanized: Desantno-shturmovi viiska Ukrainy, pronounced [deˌsɑntnoʃtʊrmoˈwi wijˈsʲkɑ ʊkrɐˈjinɪ], abbr. ДШВ, DShV), known until 2017 as the Ukrainian Airmobile Forces, (Note: Ukrainian: Високомобільні десантні війська України, romanized: Vysokomobilni desantni viiska Ukrainy, lit. 'High-mobility airborne forces of Ukraine'; abbreviated as VDV (ВДВ).) are the air assault infantry and airborne forces with armoured cavalry capabilities of Armed Forces of Ukraine.

After the Dissolution of the Soviet Union in 1991, several Ukraine-based units from the Soviet Airborne Forces (VDV) were absorbed into the newly created Ukrainian Ground Forces (SVZSU), where they remained until 2016, when they separated to become one of five military branches of the Armed Forces of Ukraine.

The Air Assault Forces are in constant combat readiness. They are the high-mobility branch of the military, responsible for air assault and airborne operations, combined arms, counterinsurgency in the terrains they are trained on, drone warfare, maneuver warfare, military education and training related to air assault and airborne warfare, and peacekeeping. Before the Russo-Ukrainian War they were also the main forces sent by Ukraine to peacekeeping missions around the world. They are considered the elite of Ukraine's armed forces.

== History ==
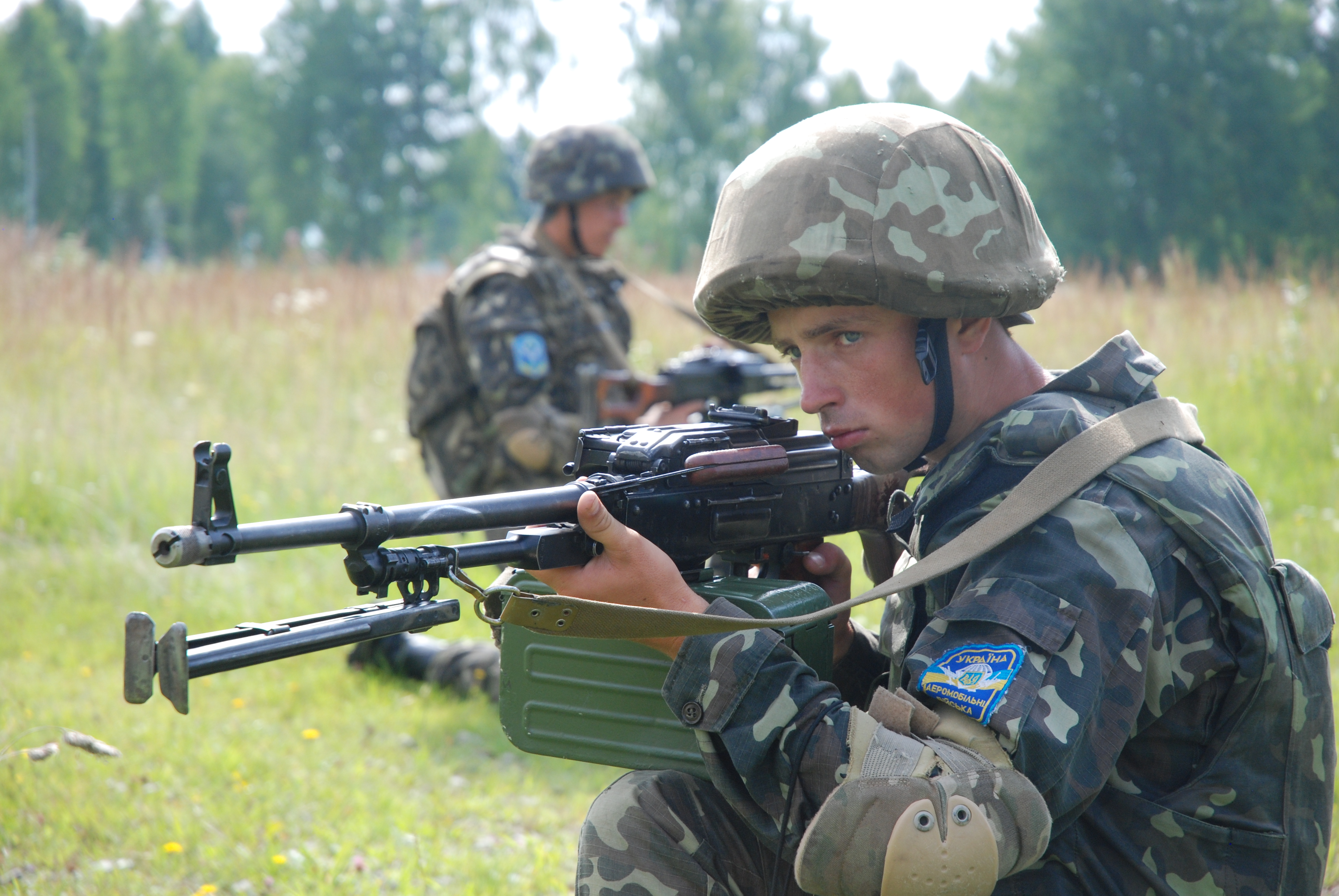
A VDV soldier in 2011

The Ukrainian Airmobile Forces were created in 1992 as part of the Ukrainian Ground Forces, from units of the Soviet Airborne Forces (VDV) stationed on Ukrainian territory after the dissolution of the Soviet Union on 25 December 1991. Part of the Soviet 98th Guards Airborne Division became the basis for the Ukrainian 1st Airmobile Division, which became known as the most capable division in the Ukrainian Ground Forces during the 1990s.

In the 15 years after their creation, Ukrainian paratroopers have served in peacekeeping missions to the Balkans, in Iraq, Kuwait, Lebanon, Sierra Leone, Liberia, Ethiopia, Georgia and DR Congo. In 2007, the 13th Separate Airmobile Battalion served as part of Polish–Ukrainian Peace Force Battalion, a peacekeeping unit with Kosovo Force.

=== War in Donbas and beyond ===
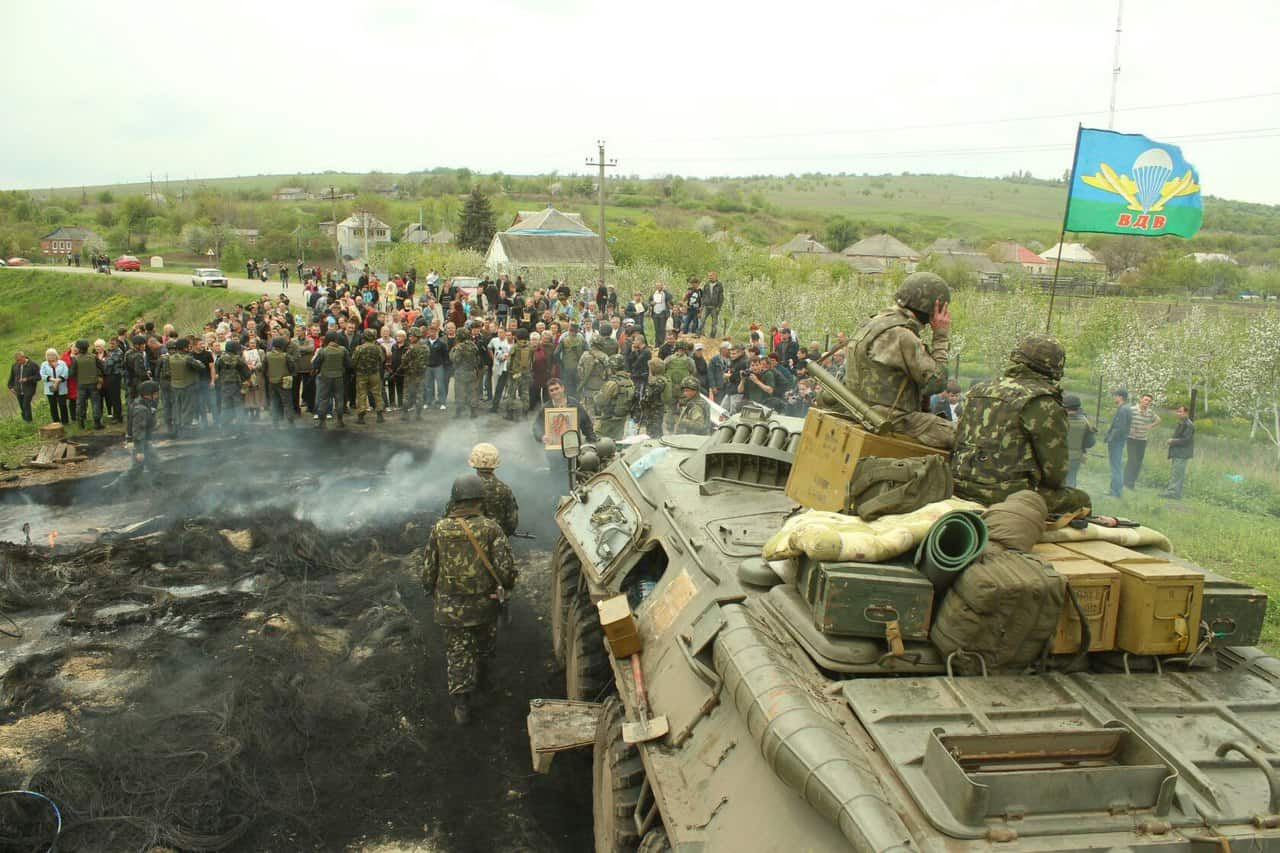
A column of the 95th Separate Airmobile Brigade heading towards Sloviansk are blocked by pro-Russian civilians during the War in Donbas, July 2014

In August 2014 the 95th Air Assault Brigade conducted a raid behind the separatist lines. The 95th Brigade, which had been reinforced with armor assets and attachments, launched a surprise attack on separatist lines, broke through into their rear areas, fought for 450 kilometers, and destroyed or captured numerous Russian tanks and artillery pieces before returning to Ukrainian lines and established a corridor in which the Ukrainian army units and civilians trapped at the border could retreat. It was one of the longest armored raids in military history.

In 2016, the Ukrainian Airmobile Forces became an independent branch of the Armed Forces. Previously, they were part of Ukrainian Ground Forces.

On 21 November 2017 (Ukraine's Paratroopers' Day) President Petro Poroshenko stated that 469 Ukrainian paratroopers had been killed in the (ongoing) Russo-Ukrainian War. On 21 November 2018 he adjusted this to 487 killed.

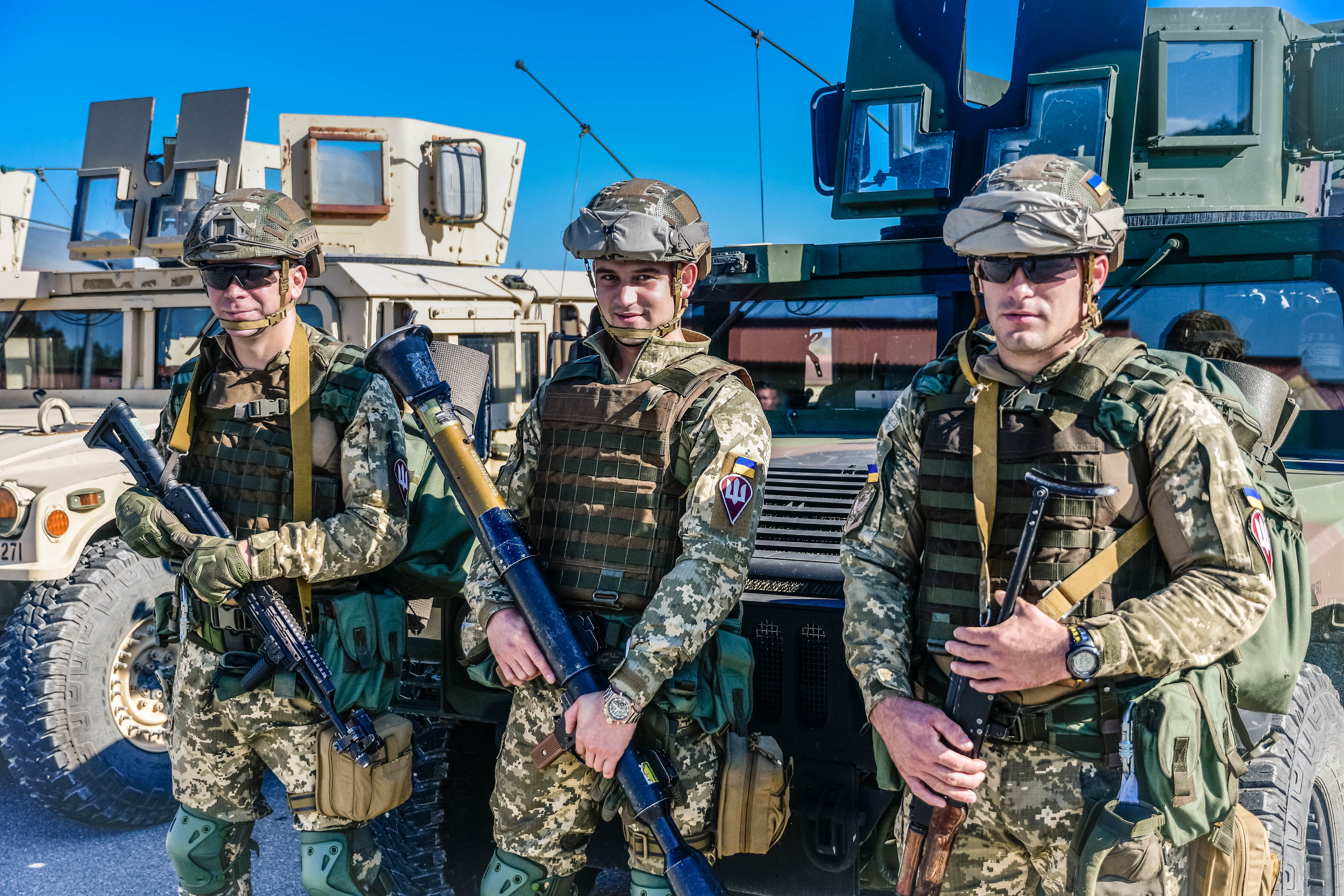
Air Assault soldiers with modernized equipment in 2018

=== 2017 reforms ===
Air Assault Forces Day was celebrated on 2 August in Ukraine, as it was in the Soviet Union, until 2017, when it changed to 21 November 2017. President Poroshenko said "It is logical to celebrate your professional holiday on November 21. The usual August 2 is the date of the first jump of paratroopers in the Moscow Military District. How is it about us? Moscow is not Kyiv. Ukraine is not Russia." He added that "The start of the new Paratroop Day is part of the Ukrainianization of the historical and political calendar – the replacement of the Soviet-Russian imposed upon us."

On 21 November 2017 the Air Assault Forces received its new insignia – the dome of a parachute "as a symbol of airborne units around the world" and the wings of Archangel Michael and "the flaming sword with which he hits the enemies". The color of the Ukrainian paratroopers was changed to maroon, and from 2017 the UkrAAF wear the maroon berets common to many Western airborne units.

On 23 May 2018, President Poroshenko signed legislation that renamed the Airmobile Forces as the Air Assault Forces.

On 6 November 2025 President Volodymyr Zelenskyy moved Ukraine's Air Assault Forces Day to 8 November because according to the Revised Julian calendar the feast day of its patron Saint Michael is celebrated on 8 November.

==== Russian invasion ====
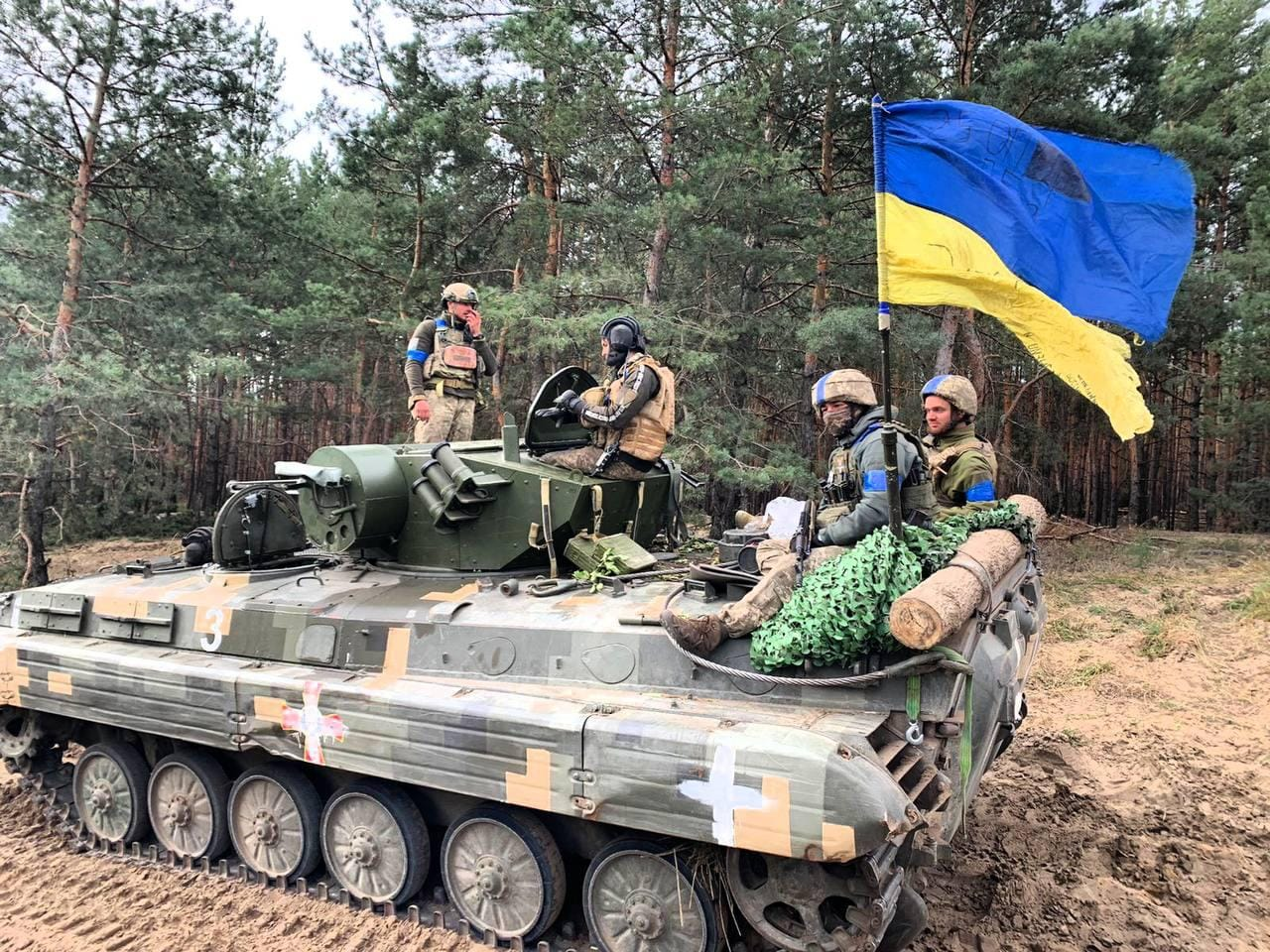
25th Airborne Brigade soldiers on top of a BMP-1TS in Eastern Ukraine, September 2022

Beginning Thursday, 24 February 2022, the day Russia launched its full-scale invasion of Ukraine, the UkrAAF have been participants of some of the land combat actions of the current conflict, fighting alongside their brethen from the Ground Forces, Territorial Defense and the National Guard.

===== Losses =====
As of February 20, 2024, the air assault forces suffered a total of 3,104 soldiers killed in action, according to publicly available information. This increased to at least 6,526 KIA as of July, 2025, with the 95th Air Assault Brigade suffering the most KIAs (with 1,319 killed).

== Organization ==
In 2014, the staffing of an airmobile brigade was brought up to 1,200 servicemen. Each brigade was given at least one artillery battalion from the 25th and 55th artillery brigades and a tank battalion. Currently, the total staffing of the brigades ranges from 1,000 to 2,200 personnel, depending on the deployment. Most of the brigades operate in 1-2 battalion tactical groups, in each of which, in addition to infantry battalions, there are up to two field artillery battalions and at least one tank company equipped with BTRs and BMP IFVs.

=== Organization 2001 ===
In 2001 the Airmobile Force consisted of:

Unit	Base #	Location	Status
Headquarters 1st Airmobile Division	А0220	Bolhrad	Inactive since 2003
25th Airborne Brigade	А1126	Hvardiiske (Dnipropetrovsk Oblast)	
45th Airmobile Brigade	А1533	Bolhrad	
27th Mechanized Brigade	А0664	Bilhorod-Dnistrovskyi	
91st Artillery Regiment	А0242	Veselyi Kut	
95th Airmobile Brigade	А0281	Zhytomyr	
79th Airmobile Regiment	А0224	Mykolaiv	
80th Airmobile Regiment	А0284	Lviv	

1st Airmobile Division
Separate Brigade
Separate Regiments

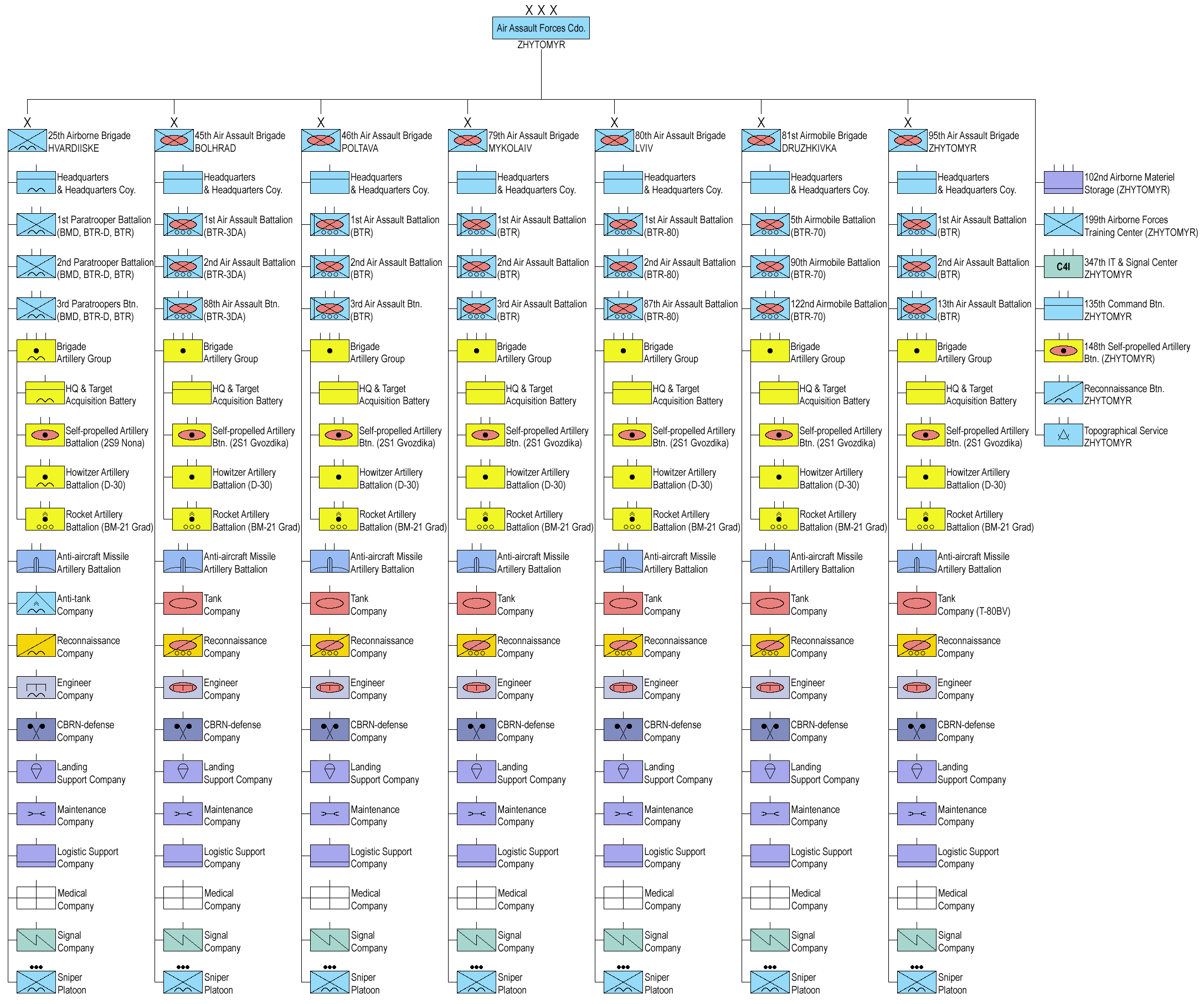
Ukrainian Air Assault Forces organization 2017

=== Current structure ===
Air Assault Forces brigades 2023
Airborne Air Assault Airmobile Jaeger

Composition of Air Assault Forces of the Armed Forces of Ukraine
Air Assault Forces General Command	A3771	Zhytomyr, Zhytomyr Oblast	Commander Maj. Gen. Oleh Apostol
135th Headquarters Battalion	A3771	Zhytomyr, Zhytomyr Oblast	Commander Lt. Col. Vadym Kinzerskyi
VII Air Assault Corps			
VIII Air Assault Corps			
87th Headquarters Battalion			
25th Airborne Brigade	A1126	Zarichne, Dnipropetrovsk Oblast	Commander Colonel Yuriy Sodol
46th Airmobile Brigade	A4350	Poltava, Poltava Oblast	Commander Col. Valeriy Skred
71st Jaeger Brigade	A4030	Kremenchuk, Poltava Oblast	
77th Airmobile Brigade "Naddnipryanska"	A4355	Kryvyi Rih, Dnipropetrovsk Oblast	
78th Assault Regiment "Herts"	A7788		Commander Col. Vyacheslav Ponamarenko
79th Air Assault Brigade: 1st Air Assault Company "Belarus"; 3rd Assault Battalion "Phoenix"	A0224: n/a; n/a	Mykolaiv, Mykolaiv Oblast: n/a; n/a	Commander Col. Oleksandr Lutsenko: Commander "Phoenix"; Commander Maj. Roman Kasyanchuk
80th Air Assault Brigade	A0284	Lviv, Lviv Oblast	Commander Col. Emil Ishkulov
81st Airmobile Brigade: 5th Battalion Tactical Group; 90th Airmobile Battalion; 122nd Airmobile Battalion	A2120: A1493; A0641; A4165	Kramatorsk, Donetsk Oblast: Terentiivka, Poltava Oblast; Kostiantynivka, Donetsk Oblast; Druzhkivka, Donetsk Oblast	Col. Oleksandr Lykhman: Commander Lt. Col Oleg Chuyko; Commander Maj. Vladyslav Tsiba; Commander Maj. Oleksandr Lunyov
82nd Air Assault Brigade	A2582	Chernivtsi, Chernivtsi Oblast	Commander Lt. Col. Pavlo Rozlach
95th Air Assault Brigade: 13th Airmobile Battalion	A0281: A1910	Zhytomyr, Zhytomyr Oblast: Zhytomyr, Zhytomyr Oblast	Commander Col. Oleg Apostol: Commander Maj. Oleksandr Porhun
132nd Reconnaissance Battalion	А2298	Ozerne, Zhytomyr Oblast	Commander Maj. Yuriy Hupalyuk
148th Artillery Brigade	A3316	Zhytomyr, Zhytomyr Oblast	Commander Col. Maksym Lanovy
421st Battalion of Unmanned Systems			in formation
Training units
199th Training and Education Center: 37th Combined Military Training Ground; Airborne Training School (as part of 37th)	A2900: A0339	Zhytomyr, Zhytomyr Oblast: Perlyavka, Zhytomyr Oblast	
Support units
Commander's Office of Amphibious Support			
33rd Engineering Battalion	A4733		
71st Center for Moral and Psychological Support			Commander Lt. Col. Serhii Shevchuk
102nd Storage Warehouse for Airborne Equipment	А3749	Zhytomyr, Zhytomyr Oblast	
124th Topographic Unit	A1977	Zhytomyr, Zhytomyr Oblast	
170th Logistic Battalion	A4633	Korostyshiv, Zhytomyr Oblast	
232nd Unified Support Base	A0310	Vinnytsia, Vinnytsia Oblast	
25th Garrison of Airborne Assault Troops Officers			
12th Center for the Protection of State Secrets	A4223		
347th Information and Telecommunications Node	A0876	Zhytomyr, Zhytomyr Oblast	

== Commanders ==
The flag of Ukraine's Commander-in-Chief of the Air Assault Forces

Name	Rank	Period of command
Vitaly Raevsky	Major general	1992–1998
Ivan Yakubets	Colonel	1998–2005
Serhiy Lysovyi	Colonel	2005–2012
Oleksandr Shvets	Colonel	2012–2015
Mykhailo Zabrodskyi	Lieutenant general	March 2015 – August 2019
Yevhen Moisiuk	Major general	August 2019 – 9 August 2021
Maksym Myrhorodskyy	Major general	9 August 2021 – 11 February 2024
Ihor Skybiuk	Major general	11 February 2024 – 3 June 2025
Oleh Apostol	Brigadier general	3 June 2025

== Armament ==
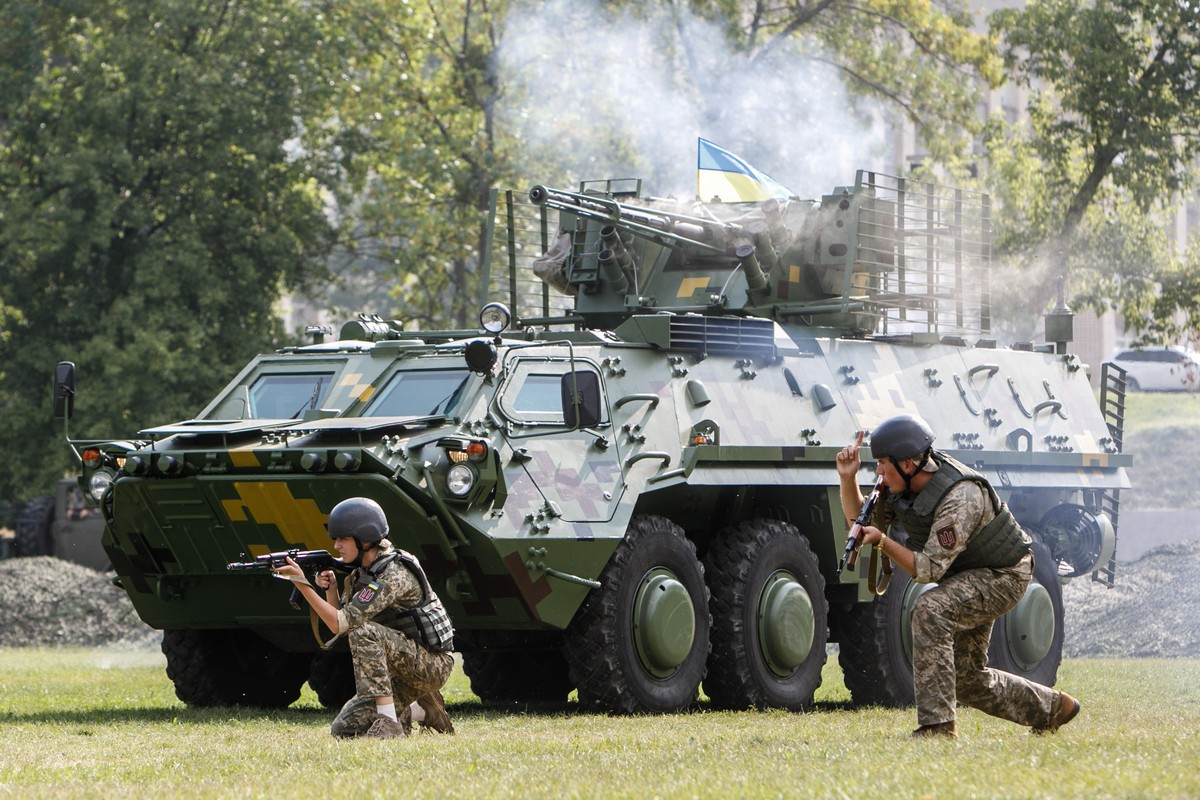
A BTR-4

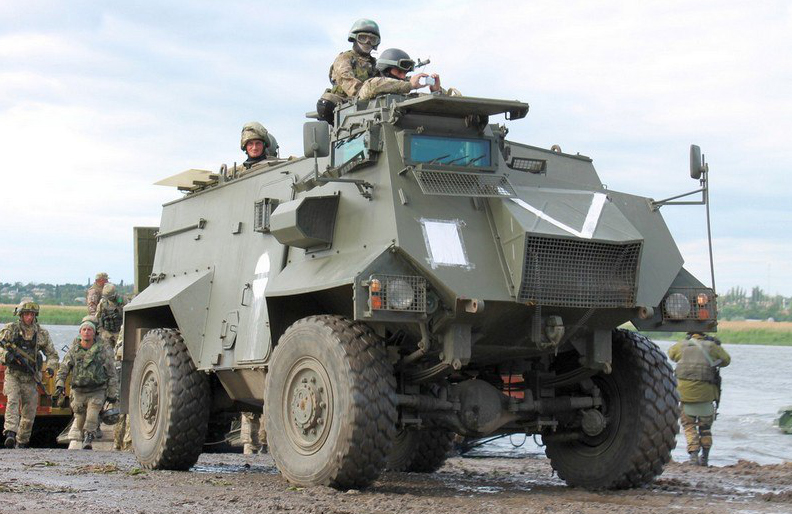
A AT-105 Saxon

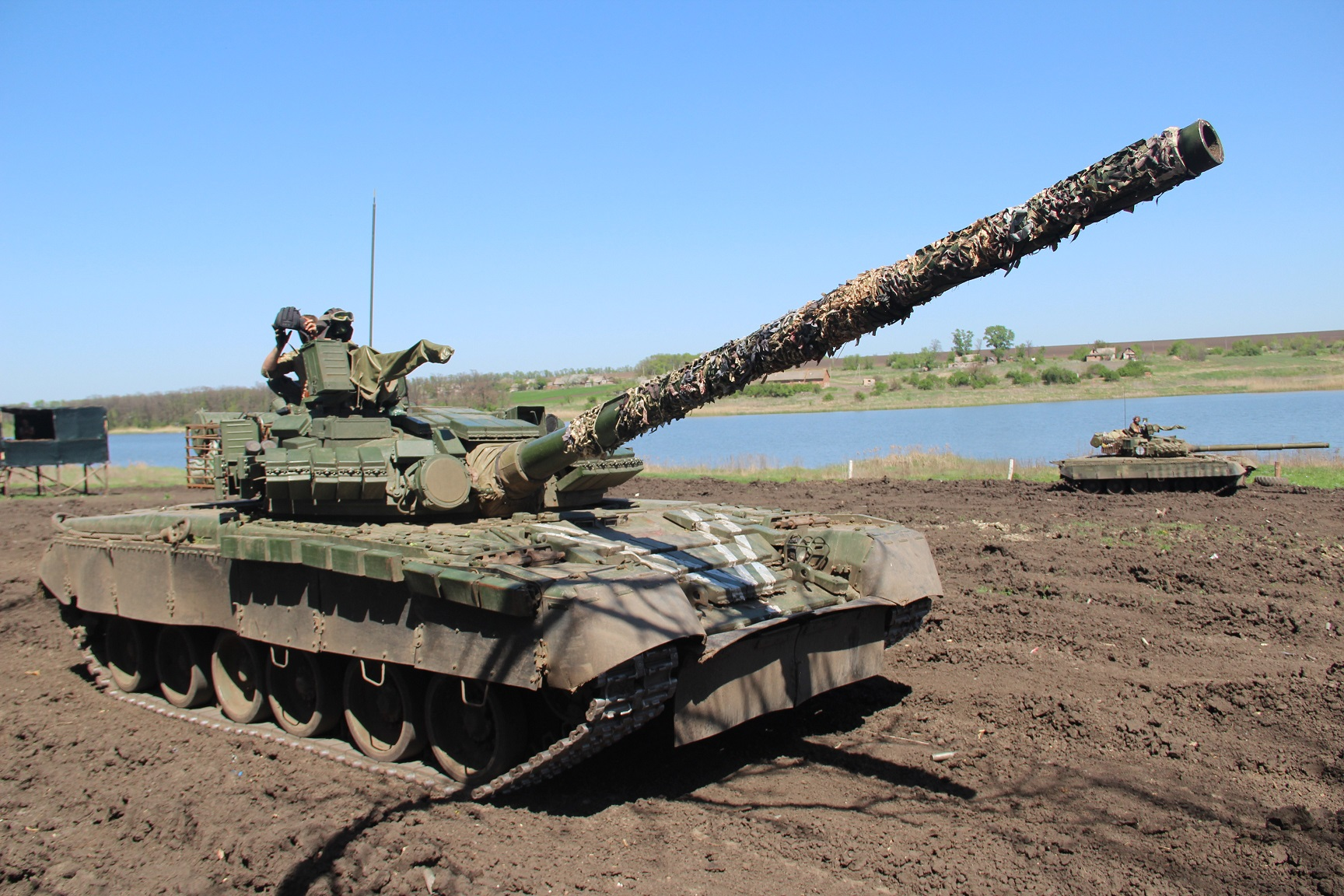
A T-80BV of the 95th Air Assault Brigade

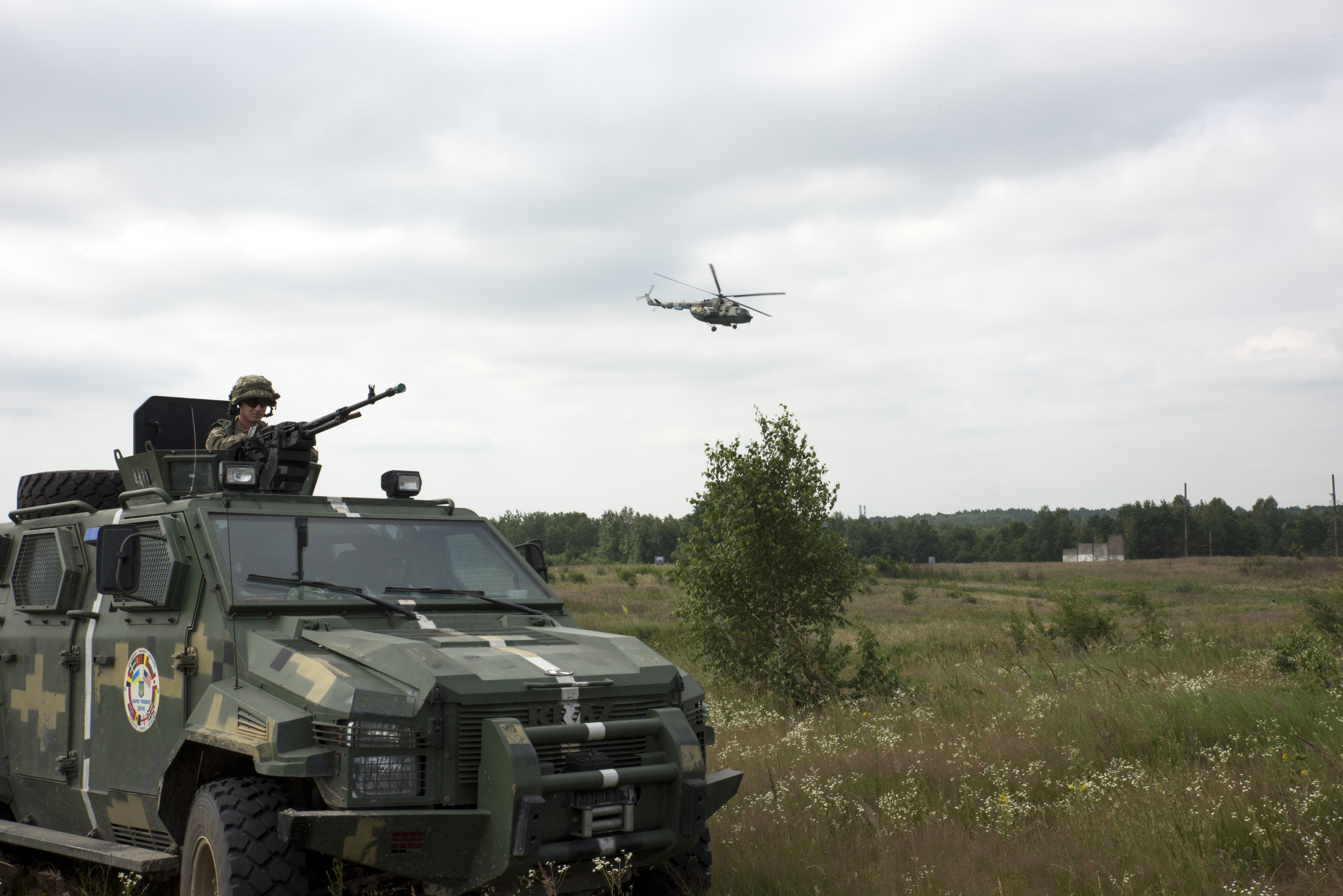
A Ukrainian soldier with a KrAZ Spartan prepares to engage the opposition force during an air assault at Exercise Rapid Trident 16, July 2016

=== Personal firearms ===
- PM, semi-automatic pistol (9×18mm)
- Fort-14
- AKS-74, (Note: S stands for skladnoy (Russian: складной, lit. 'folding'). Issued only for parachute-landing purposes) para assault rifle (AK-74 with folding skeleton buttstock) (5.45×39mm)
- AKS-74U, short-barreled para assault rifle carbine with folding skeleton buttstock(5.45×39mm)
- AKMS, para assault rifle with a downward-folding metal stock similar to that of the German MP40 (7.62×39mm)
- AK-TK – AK-74 modernization
- Fort-221 – TAR-21 licensed copy
- RPKS-74, the light weight para machinegun (5.45×39mm)
- PKM, general purpose machine gun (7.62×54mmR)
- Dragunov SVDS sniper rifle (7.62×54mmR)
- GP-25 and GP-30, the under-barrel 40 mm grenade launchers for fragmentation and gas grenades which are attached to AKS-74 of some paratroopers to increase firepower for combating enemy foot troops
- AGS-17 "Plamya" (Flame), automatic grenade launcher – may be replaced in the future by a much lighter UAG-40.

=== Armored vehicles ===
- T-80 - principal main battle tank
- Challenger 2 main battle tank
- BMD-1
- BMD-2
- BMD-3
- BTR-MDM
- BTR-D
- BTR-80
- BTR-70
- BTR-3
- BTR-4
- Stryker
- MT-LB
- GT-MU
- KrAZ "Spartan"
- HMMWV M1114 UAH
- AT105 Saxon
- Dozor-B
- Véhicule de l'Avant Blindé
- Bushmaster Protected Mobility Vehicle

=== Artillery ===
- M777 howitzer
- 2S9 "Nona-S" configuration of 2S9 Nona, 120 mm self-propelled mortar
- 2S23 Nona-SVK
- 2S1 Gvozdika
- 2S3 Akatsiya
- BM-21 Grad
- ZU-23-2, an aged but effective and powerful design of a double barrel 23 mm anti-aircraft gun, commonly used against infantry and even APCs and IFVs, it is either mounted on any amphibious hulls, usually based on PT-76 light tank, or can be towed by jeep or truck as it has wheels.

=== Vehicles ===
- KrAZ-6322
- GAZ-66
- Joint Light Tactical Vehicle

== Gallery ==
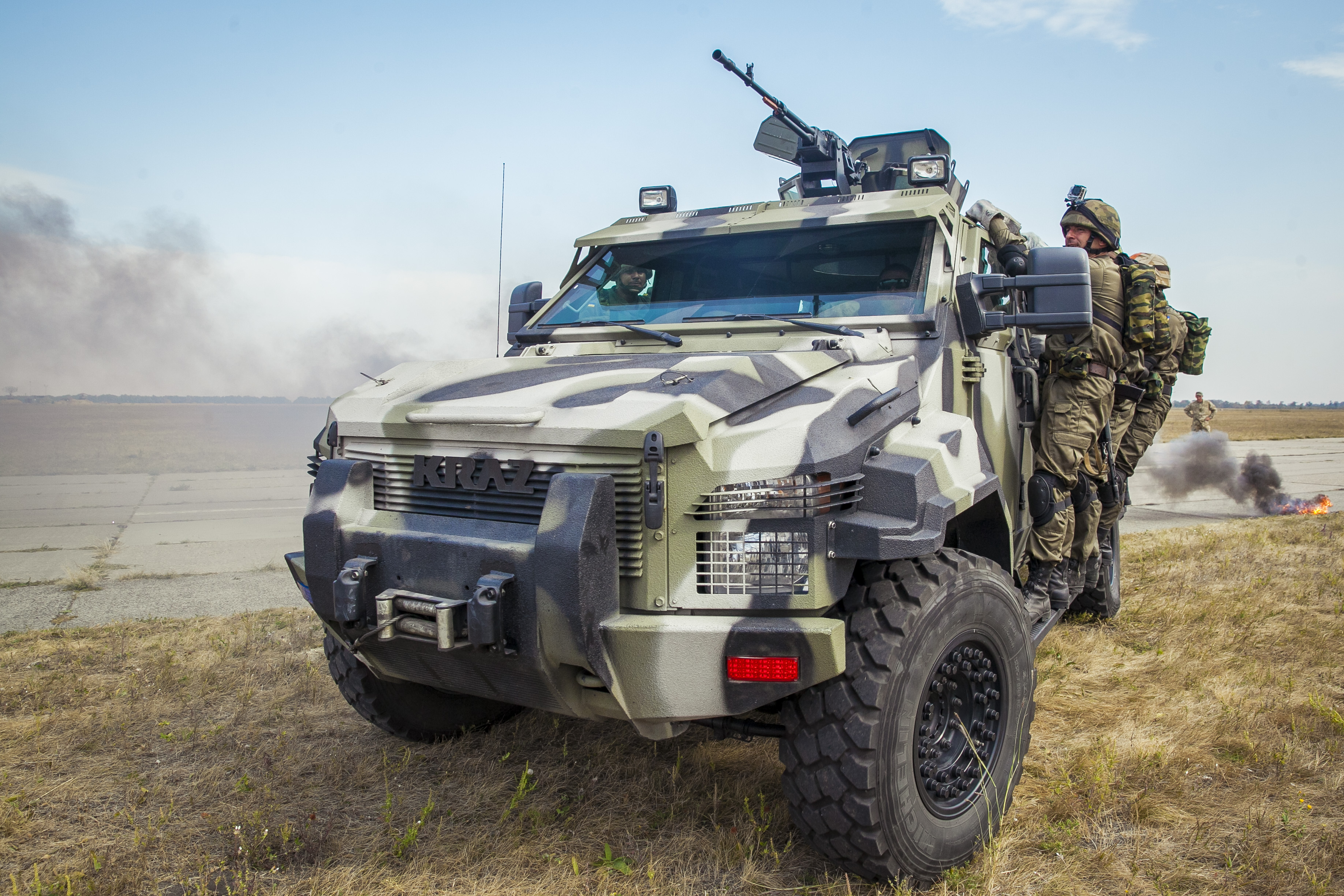
A KRAZ Spartan

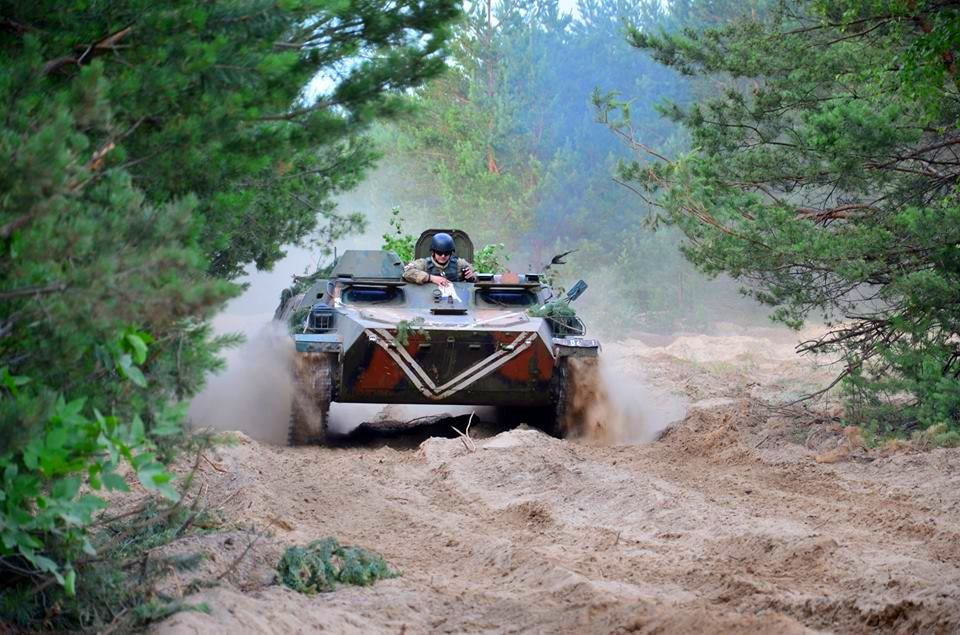
A MTLB

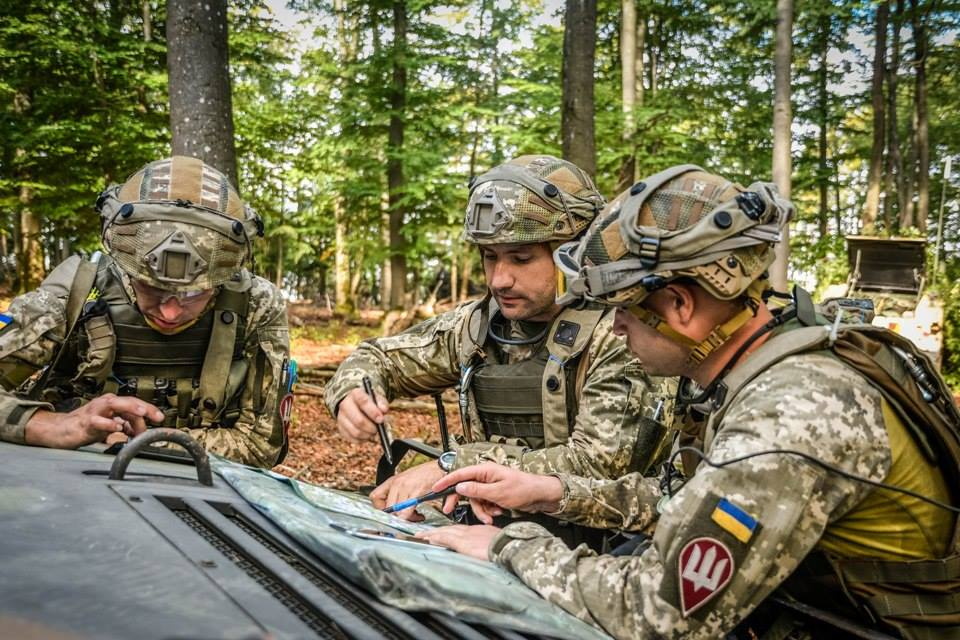
Soldiers prepare for movement during Saber Junction-2018.

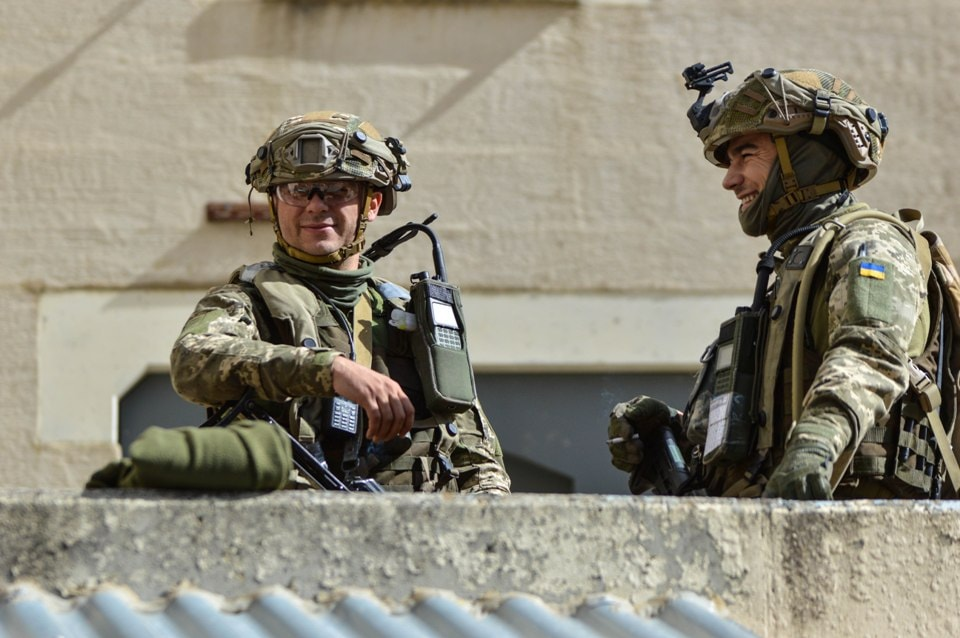
Soldiers during Saber Junction-2018

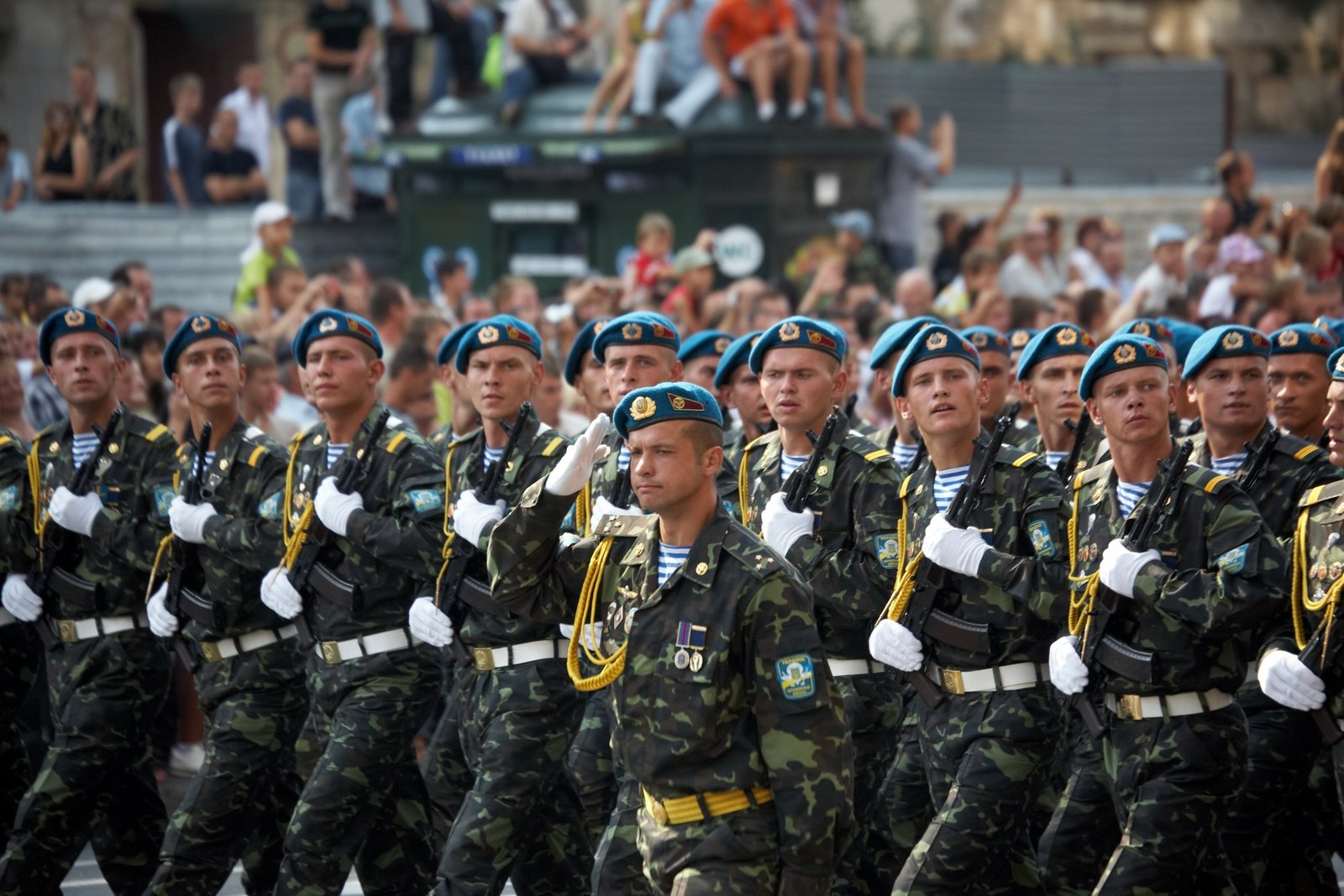
VDV troops in a military parade in 2014, when they still wore sky-blue berets and telnyashka shirts like their Russian counterparts

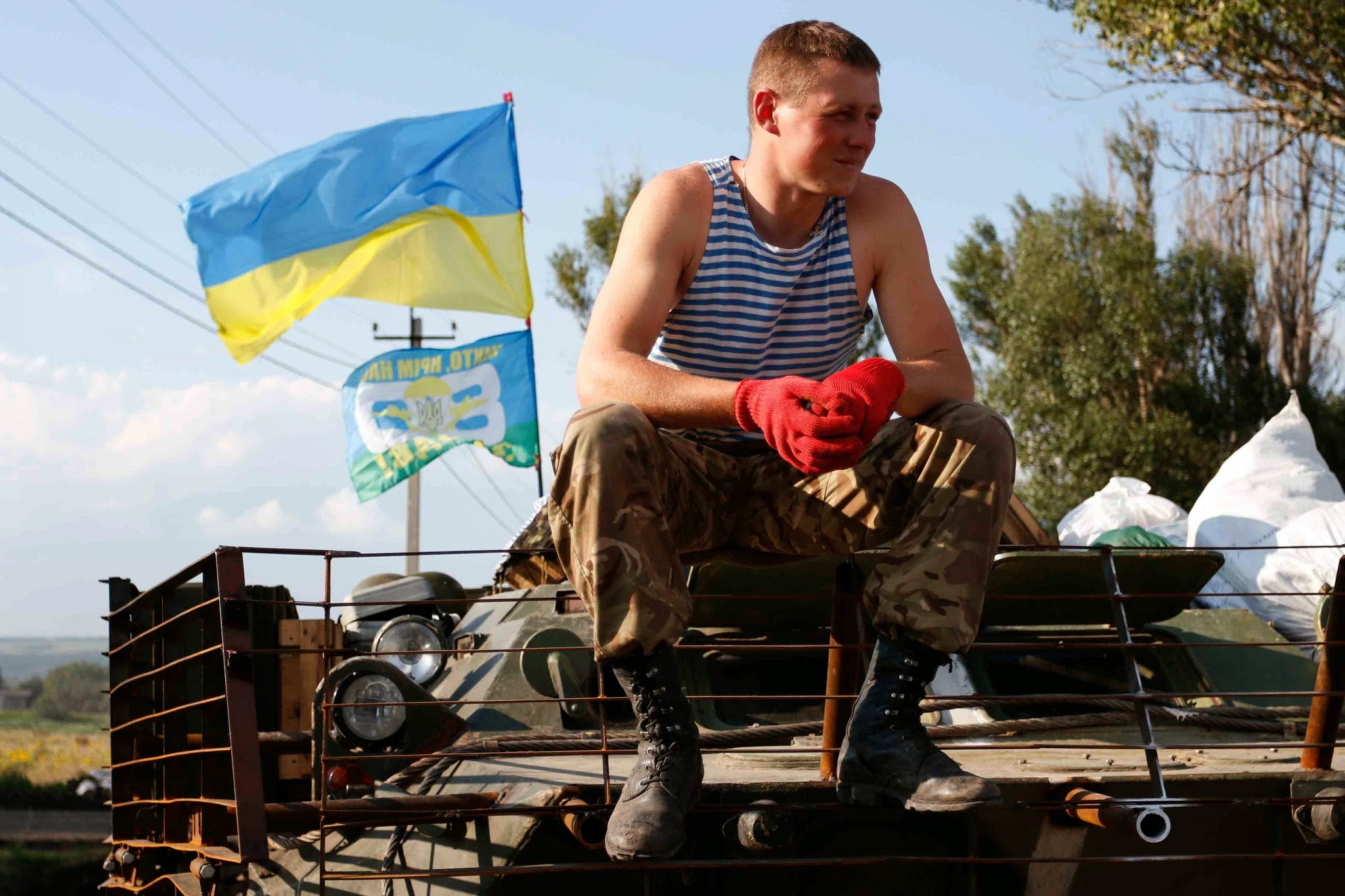
VDV soldier in 2014 during the War in Donbas

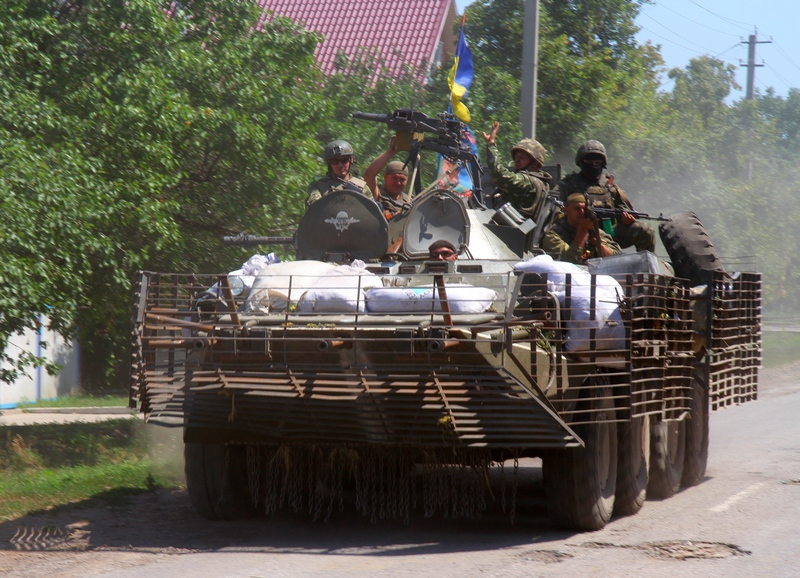
VDV BTR-80 during the War in Donbas

Flag of the Airmobile forces until 2017

Shoulder sleeve insignia until 2017

Former emblem

== See also ==
- Special forces of Ukraine
- Russian Airborne Forces
