= Raid of the 95th Brigade =

Event in the War in Donbas

- Part of the War in Donbas
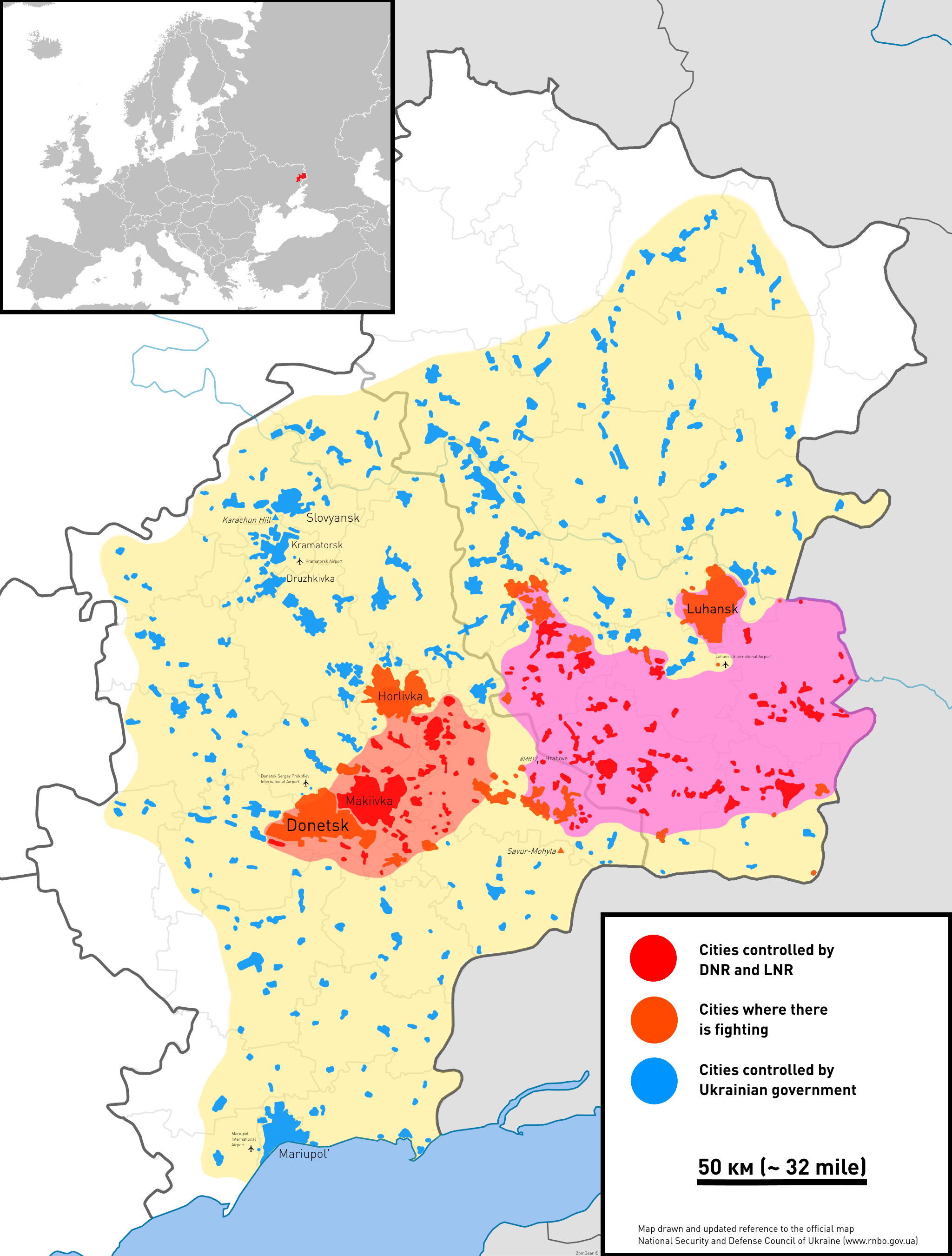
- Military situation as of 5 August 2014
Date	19 July — 10 August 2014 (3 weeks and 1 day)
Location	Luhansk Oblast, Donetsk Oblast, Donbas, Ukraine
Result	Ukrainian victory

Belligerents
Ukraine	Russia; Luhansk People's Republic; Donetsk People's Republic

Commanders and leaders
(Ukraine) Mykhailo Zabrodsky	Unknown

Units involved
95th Airmobile Brigade Reinforcements: 25th Airborne Brigade; 30th Mechanized Brigade; 51st Mechanized Brigade	(Russia) Russian Armed Forces; Separatists

Casualties and losses
13 paratroopers killed 74 wounded 60% of equipment lost	3 checkpoints destroyed Unknown killed and wounded

From July 19 to August 10, 2014, during the war in Donbas, units of the 95th Airmobile Brigade, reinforced with assets from the 25th Airborne and 30th and 51st Mechanized Brigades, conducted a raid, during which they advanced from Kramatorsk, fighting Russian and separatist forces in Artemivsk, Debaltseve, Savur-Mohyla, Krasnyi Luch and Luhansk, returning back to Kramatorsk. During the raid, the 95th Brigade paratroopers entered into armed clashes with the Russian Army.

== Planning ==
In June 2014, Ukraine's leadership developed a strategic plan that foresaw the Ukrainian military blocking both the Russia–Ukraine border as well as the surroundings of major cities in Donetsk and Luhansk oblasts. In July, the units blocking the border came into the southeast vicinity of Luhansk Oblast and in the east of Donetsk Oblast. ATO command had developed a plan for the release of units at the border. According to the plan, the units of the 95th Air Assault Brigade, 30th Mechanized Brigade, 51st Mechanized Brigade, 25th Airborne were to occupy Savur-Mohyla, Stepanivka, and Marynivka, to establish control over ferries on the Mius River, and to relieve the units of the 24th, 72nd Mechanized, and 79th Air Assault Brigades.

The main strike of the operation consisted of 400 paratroopers of the 95th Air Assault Brigade and multiple tanks of the 30th Mechanized Brigade. All who took part in the operation were volunteers.

== Battles ==
=== Battle for Lysychansk ===
The first battles in the raid began for the recapture of Lysychansk, located in the northwest of Luhansk Oblast. According to the operation's plan, the 95th Airmobile Brigade units were to conduct raids and go to the southern outskirts of the city and from there start eliminating enemy units while the 24th Brigade advanced from the north. In tandem with 95th brigade's northward push, forces from the Donbas Battalion of the National Guard of Ukraine assisted in removing Russian units on the way to the city center.

Two days before the assault of Lysychansk, scouts were sent to identify the reference points of militants. On the reconnaissance mission, the scouts discovered a block post, which wasn't previously known.

On July 19, units of the 95th brigade went on the offensive, destroying the block post and advancing on a strategically important height. The initial attempt to seize the height was unsuccessful; however, during a new battle which lasted a few hours, the height was abandoned by pro-Russian forces.

Following the strategic height's capture by the 95th brigade, paratroopers took control of a nearby oil refinery that risked destruction from pro-Russian forces. The full battle lasted from midday until the evening on July 19. Amongst Ukrainian forces, five paratroopers were reported killed while an additional 40 were injured. The advance of Ukrainian forces resulted in celebrations amongst locals, with one soldier who fought with the 95th brigade later relating:

That was the greatest joy for all the time of my service. When local saw that armoured personnel carriers with Ukrainian symbols, they ran to salute us. On the way the local people unfolded blue-yellow flags and dressed up vyshyvankas. They were standing along the road clapping, singing the Ukrainian hymn and shouting "Glory to Ukraine!", "Thank you for coming!". — Vasyl Bodnar, soldier of the 95th brigade.

=== Shakhtarsk, Torez and Snizhne ===
On 30 July 2014 forces of the 95th Brigade followed the 1st Battallion of the 25th Airborne Brigade, which entered Shakhtarsk and opened the way for the unit's advance towards Torez and Snizhne.

=== Breakout from Izvaryne ===
Thanks to the actions of the 95th Brigade, on 8 August forces of the 79th Air Assault Brigade were able to escape encirclement in the area of Izvaryne and return into Ukrainian-controlled territory.

== Results ==
According to Ukrainian government reports, the paratroopers ultimately successfully carried out a 470-kilometer raid on the rear of the separatists while also destroying three hostile checkpoints. However, the most important achievement was the creation of an evacuation corridor allowing units trapped at the border to retreat. As a result of the raid, 3,000 Ukrainian forces and more than 250 pieces of equipment were able to be evacuated safely.

== Significance ==
The raid is noteworthy because of its length and the fact that it was the first time Ukrainian and Russian forces clashed in the war in Donbas. According to Dr. Phillip Karber, president of the Potomac Institute for Policy Studies and military expert, it was one of the longest armored raids in military history.

The raid also significantly boosted the morale of Ukrainian forces, especially the Air Assault forces who had spearheaded much of the campaign. The 95th Air Assault Brigade was particularly praised by Dr. Karber for their skill and conduct during the raid.

== See also ==
- Outline of the Russo-Ukrainian War
- Ukrainian Air Assault Forces
