= 132nd Air Assault Reconnaissance Battalion (Ukraine) =

132nd Separate Reconnaissance Battalion
- 132-й окремий розвідувальний батальйон
- Battalion Insignia
- Active: 2018-present
- Country: Ukraine
- Branch: Ukrainian Air Assault Forces
- Type: Air assault infantry
- Role: Air assault ISTAR; Reconnaissance; Target acquisition
- Part of: Ukrainian Air Assault Forces
- Garrison/HQ: Zhytomyr
- Engagements: Russo-Ukrainian War: War in Donbas; 2022 Russian Invasion of Ukraine; 2024 Kursk offensive
- Decorations: For Courage and Bravery

Commanders
- Current commander: Chuprinyuk Dmytro Serhiyovych

Insignia
- Flag

132nd Separate Reconnaissance Battalion is a separate reconnaissance battalion subordinated directly to the Ukrainian Air Assault Forces (AAFU) and is tasked with conducting reconnaissance and target acquisition operations with small unit tactics for the Ukrainian Air Assault Forces.

It was established in 2018 and has taken part in multiple combat operations throughout the Russo-Ukrainian war.

== History ==
UAV operator of the Battalion with a recon drone

The battalion was established on October 29, 2018, for the purpose of conducting reconnaissance and target acquisition operations for the Ukrainian Air Assault Forces.

The battalion's personnel took part in Exercise Cambrian Patrol Servicemen of the battalion along with 127 other teams from 27 countries, the competition is considered one amongst the most difficult in Europe, but the battalion managed to secure a second place.

The battalion has seen intensive combat during the Russo-Ukrainian war. It took part in the Battle for Ovruch with a battalion's sniper (Dmytro Oleksiyovych Karbovsky) being killed in action on 20 March 2022. It also saw combat in Zhytomyr Oblast with a female soldier of the battalion (Polishchuk Victoria Olehivna) being killed on 21 March 2022. A soldier of the battalion (Artem Pastovenskyi) was killed on 22 Match 2022.

On 12 April 2022, a soldier of the battalion (Vdovichenko Vadim Viktorovych) was killed while operating in Kharkiv Oblast.

The battalion saw heavy combat during the battle of Izium, in May 2022, two soldiers of the battalion (Andriy Meheda and Ivan Zaytec) being killed on 2 May 2022 while on a reconnaissance mission near the city of Izium. On 19 May 2022, another soldier (Oleg Mazur) was killed in an engagement with Russian forces in Izium. A soldier (Maxim Sizov) was killed on 3 July 2022 after being wounded the day prior by a Russian grenade attack.

On 17 November 2022, the 132nd Separate Reconnaissance Battalion was awarded the honorary award "For Courage and Bravery" by the President of Ukraine.

The battalion saw action during the 2023 Ukrainian counteroffensive with a soldier (Ilya Dotsenko) being killed as a result of a Russian airstrike in Zaporizhzhia. On 7 November 2023, the battalion received new "Atom Military" electric bikes for combat use.

The battalion is taking part in the 2024 Kursk offensive with another soldier (Yuriy Andriyovych Pyvovarov) being killed on 31 August 2024 while performing a combat reconnaissance and target acquisition mission in Sheptukhivka. On 7 September 2024, another soldier (Serhiy Oliychuk) was killed in Donetsk Oblast.

== Commanders ==
- Major Horpynych Artem Volodymyrovych (2018–2020)
- Major Matiiv Vasyl Vasyliovych (2020–2022)
- Lieutenant Colonel Gupalyuk Yury Ihorovych (2022–2023)
- Major Chuprinyuk Dmytro Serhiyovych (2023-)

== Structure ==
- 132nd Air Assault Reconnaissance Battalion
  - Management and Headquarters
    - 1st Reconnaissance Company
    - 2nd Reconnaissance Company
    - 3rd Reconnaissance Company
    - 4th Reconnaissance Company
    - Anti-aircraft missile Platoon
    - Communications platoon
    - Logistics Company
    - Technical Intelligence Company
    - Unmanned Aerial Vehicle (UAV) Company
