= Zarichne, Dnipropetrovsk Oblast =

Rural locality in Dnipropetrovsk Oblast, Ukraine

Zarichne Зарічне
- Rural settlement
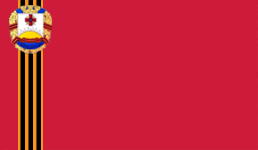
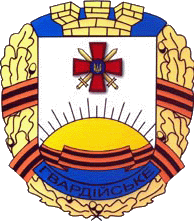
- Flag Coat of arms
- Interactive map of Zarichne
- Location within Ukraine Location within Dnipropetrovsk Oblast
- Coordinates: 48°44′05″N 35°19′45″E
- Country: Ukraine
- Oblast: Dnipropetrovsk Oblast
- Raion: Samar Raion
- Hromada: Cherkaske settlement hromada
- Established: 1957
- Founder: 42nd Tank Division

Population (2001)
  - Total: 5,199
- Time zone: UTC+2 (EET)
  - Summer (DST): UTC+3 (EEST)

Zarichne (Ukrainian: Зарічне), formerly known as Hvardiiske (Ukrainian: Гвардійське), is a rural settlement in Dnipropetrovsk Oblast, Ukraine. It is part of Samar Raion. Zarichne is located on the left bank of the Samara River, about 5.5 kilometres (3.4 mi) upstream from Cherkaske. It belongs to Cherkaske settlement hromada, one of the hromadas of Ukraine. Population: 6,024 (2022 estimate) According to the 2001 census, population was 5,199.

Zarichne is better known for housing the 25th Airborne Brigade (Ukraine) (since summer of 2002) and originally was established in 1957 as a military base for the 42nd Guards Tank Division. The town was named for the Guards designation of the unit.

Until 26 January 2024, Hvardiiske was designated urban-type settlement. On this day, a new law entered into force which abolished this status, and Hvardiiske became a rural settlement.

On 19 September 2024, the Verkhovna Rada voted to rename Hvardiiske to Zarichne.
