= 25th Airborne Brigade =

Ukrainian military unit

25th Airborne "Sicheslav" Brigade
- 25-та окрема повітрянодесантна «Січеславська» бригада
- Brigade insignia
- Active: 5 June 1993 – present
- Country: Ukraine
- Branch: Ukrainian Air Assault Forces
- Role: Air Assault Forces
- Part of: 7th Rapid Response Corps
- Garrison/HQ: Zarichne, Dnipropetrovsk Oblast
- Mottos: No One But Us (Ukrainian: Ніхто, крім нас!)
- Engagements: Russo-Ukrainian war; War in Donbas; Russian invasion of Ukraine; Pokrovsk offensive
- Decorations: For Courage and Bravery
- Website: Official Facebook page

Commanders
- Current commander: Colonel Ilya Petrina

Insignia
- Flag

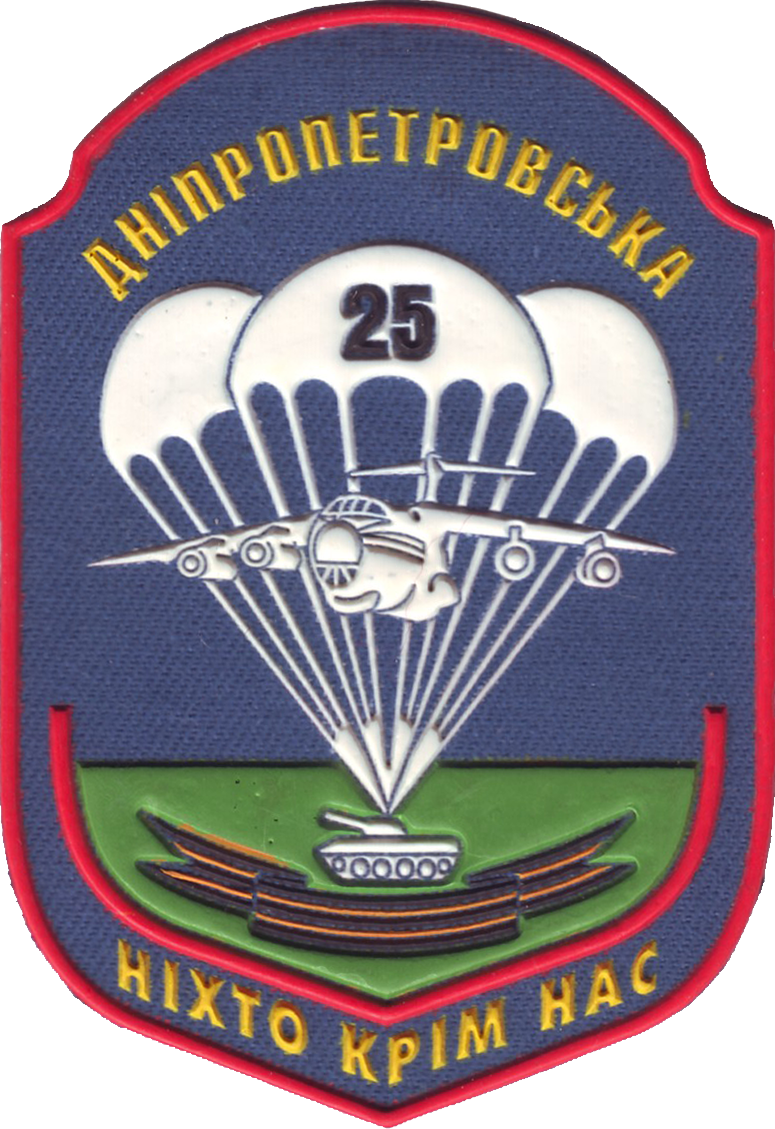
- Former insignia

The 25th Airborne Brigade "Sicheslav" (Ukrainian: 25-та окрема повітрянодесантна "Січеславська" бригада; 25 ОПДБр, MUN А1126) is an airborne formation of the Ukrainian Air Assault Forces.

The brigade is the only airborne unit of Ukrainian Air Assault Forces which possesses BMD-1 and BMD-2 airborne infantry fighting vehicles, and is the only unit which can be deployed anywhere by parachute, together with armored vehicles, from Il-76MD aircraft.

== History ==
Between 25 June and 11 August 1969, the 217th Guards Airborne Regiment (Base #11389 [Military Unit No.11389?]) of the 98th Guards Airborne Division of the Soviet Airborne Forces was located in Bolhrad, Odesa Oblast, now in modern Ukraine.

After the dissolution of the USSR, the 98th Guards Airborne Division was split between Ukraine and the Russian Federation. In the spring of 1993, the 217th Guards Airborne Regiment was relocated to Ivanovo, Russia, together with the regiment's war flag, the Order of Kutuzov, and 55% of its supplies.

== Current unit ==
The Ukrainian airmobile brigade was formed in Bolhrad in May 1993, following an order by the Ukrainian Minister of Defence. It was created from the elements of the Soviet 217th Guards Airborne Regiment. On 1 December 1993, the brigade was established as one of the units of the 1st Airmobile Division. From October 1995 until December 1999, 800 paratroopers from the brigade served as part of the 240th Special Battalion in the countries of former Yugoslavia, later serving as peacekeepers in Kosovo.

Between May and June 2002, the brigade was relocated to Hvardiyske, Dnipropetrovsk Oblast. It was given the honorable designation "Dnipropetrovsk" for their battle achievements and high level of professionalism. On 16 July 2002, it was awarded its new war flag by the then Ukrainian President, Leonid Kuchma. The brigade was transferred from the 1st Airmobile Division to the 6th Army Corps on 8 November 2002.

During the 30th Independence Day of Ukraine, President Volodymyr Zelenskyy renamed the unit the 25th Airborne Brigade "Sicheslav".

== Combat operations ==
=== Russian annexation of Crimea and the war in Donbas ===
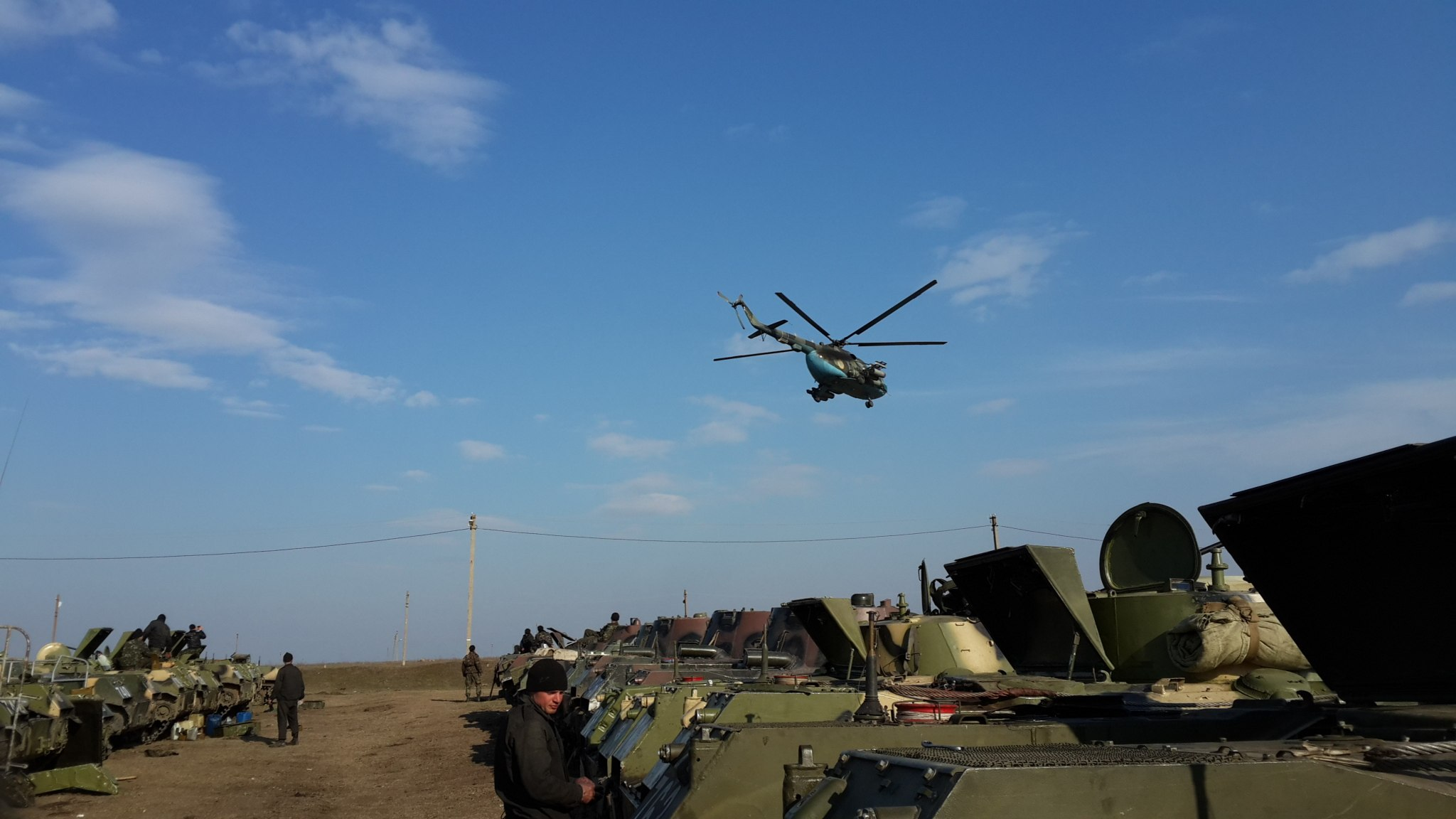
25th Airborne Brigade armored vehicles, spring 2014

On 13 June 2014, an IL-76 transport plane was shot down near Luhansk, Ukraine, killing 40 25th Airborne Brigade troops. According to a statement released by the Ukrainian Defense Ministry, "On the night of June 13–14, firing from an anti-aircraft gun and a large-caliber machine gun, anti-regime forces cynically and treacherously shot down a Ukraine armed forces transport plane IL-76 which was bringing personnel for rotation."

A company of the brigade was deployed to Crimea during its annexation by Russia in 2014. It became one of the few, if not the only, Ukrainian units to leave Crimea as a unit, still bearing their arms.

Acting President Oleksandr Turchynov announced his intention to disband the brigade, a decision that was later reversed. Since the start of the Russo-Ukrainian war, the brigade has taken an active role in the fighting in eastern Ukraine.

=== Russian invasion of Ukraine ===
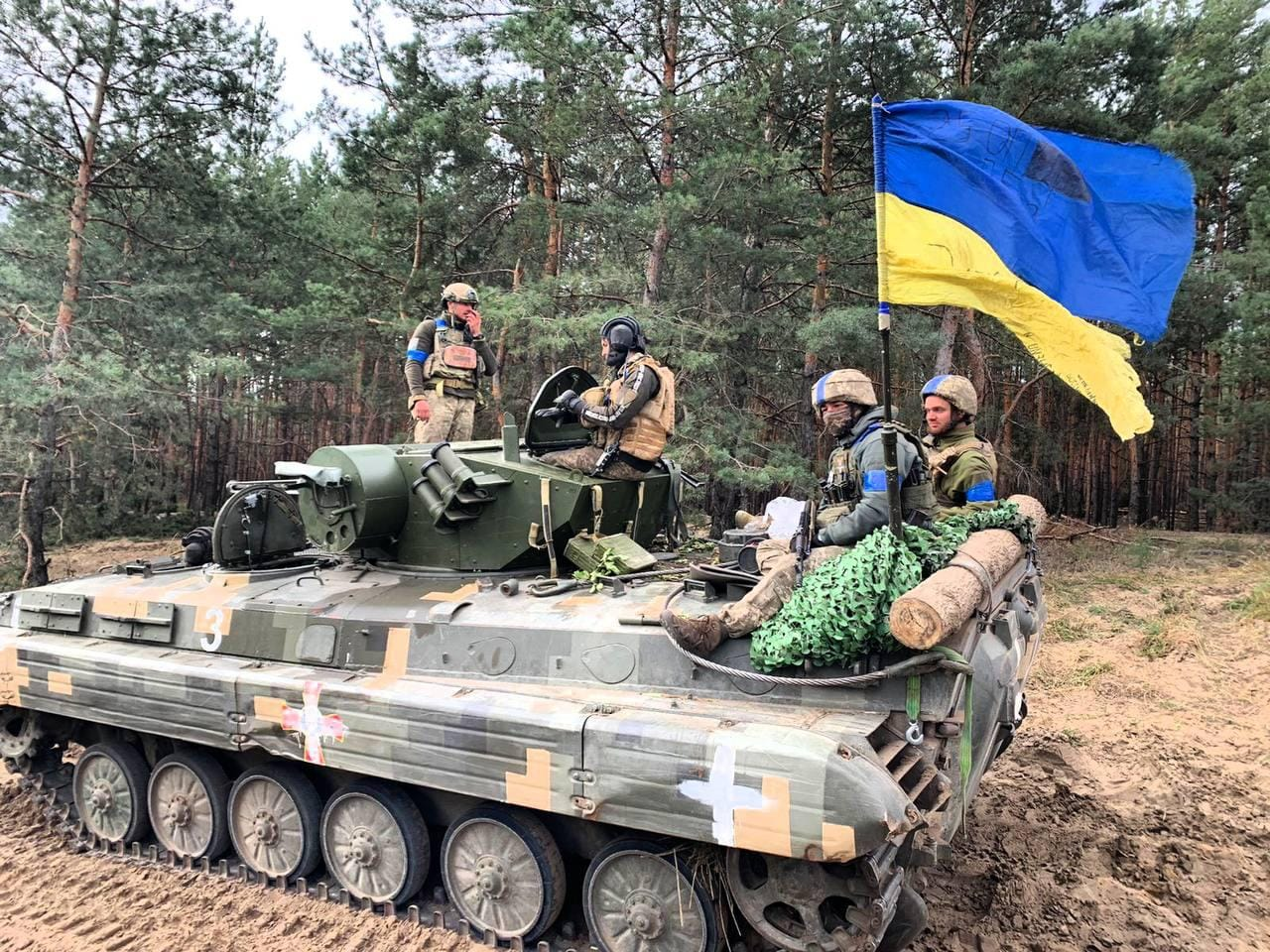
25th Airborne Brigade soldiers on top of a BMP-1TS in Eastern Ukraine, September 2022

The brigade participated in the 2022 full-scale Russian invasion of Ukraine. On 15 March 2022, a video was released showing a Russian tank being destroyed by the brigade. On 18 March 2022, the brigade released more photographs of destroyed Russian T-72s.

The 25th Brigade participated in the 2022 counteroffensive in the Kharkiv Oblast. Units of the brigade received orders to advance up to 40 miles (64 km) into Russian-held territory at high speed.

Elements of the brigade began advancing at 3:30 a.m. on 6 September, advancing 11 miles (18 km) and reaching Volokhiv Yar. Units of the 25th continued moving southeast, towards the city of Izium, for several days with little resistance. The initial battle plans called for these units to halt their advance outside of Izium, but due to an unexpected Russian withdrawal, they took the city on 10 September.

After taking Izium, units of the 25th Brigade were ordered to capture the city of Lyman in Donetsk Oblast. Part of the brigade's advance passed through the village of Korovii Yar, and units of the brigade entered Lyman from the direction of Drobysheve. After Lyman, elements of the brigade crossed into the Luhansk Oblast. As of November 2022, it was reported that the 25th Brigade was still taking part in combat in the Luhansk Oblast.

On 16 October 2023, Ukrainian Colonel General Oleksandr Syrskyi said that the 25th Airborne Brigade had shot down a Mi-8. In March 2024, Syrskyi publicly praised the 25th Brigade for its efforts in repelling Russian attacks on the villages of Berdychi and Orlivka.

The Brigade has spent most time in the defense of the Pokrovsk direction. They were equipped with a variety of vehicles including German-made Leopard 1A5 tanks, Marder Infantry fighting vehicels, Giatsint-S 152mm self-propelled gun, and vehicles provided by private fundraisers. In September 2024 25th Airborne Brigade would utilize the Ukrainian built Ratel S UAV to clear tunnels in near Novohrodivka. In December 2024 Russian assaults in the Pokrovsk direction increased dramatically. On 29 December, alone, 48 attacks were launched in a single day with thirty being repelled the same day. The 25th Brigade received special recognition for their role in Defending against the assault. President Volodymyr Zelenskyy commended the brigade for helping to contribute to Russia's record losses in the offensive.

In February 2025 the 25th Airborne Brigade liberated the village of Kotlyne near Pokrovsk in the Donetsk Oblast. The strategically important village fell under Russian control in January. During the engagement, the 25th Brigade also captured nine Russian soldiers by having them surrender to a UAV drone equipped with a loud speaker. According to Brigade officials paratroopers helped to clear the village.

== Structure ==
As of 2024, the brigade's structure is as follows:

- 25th Airborne Brigade, Zarichne
  - Headquarters & Headquarters Company
  - 1st Airborne Battalion
  - 2nd Airborne Battalion
  - 3rd Airborne Battalion
  - Sniper Platoon
  - Aerial Reconnaissance Unit "Alastor"
  - Artillery Group
    - Self-Propelled Artillery Division (2S9 Nona)
    - Howitzer Artillery Division (D-30)
    - Rocket Artillery Division (BM-21 Grad)
    - Anti-Tank Guided Missile Battery (9K111 Fagot)
  - Anti-Aircraft Missile and Artillery Division
  - Communication Company
  - Reconnaissance Landing Company
  - Tank Company (Air Transportable) (T-80BV)
  - Engineer and Sapper Company
  - Chemical, Biological, Radiological and Nuclear Defense Company
  - Logistics Company
  - Maintenance Company
  - Landing Support Company
  - Material Support Company
  - Medical Company
  - Proving Grounds
  - Brigade Band

== Past commanders ==
- Colonel Ivan Volodymyrovych Aleshchenko 1993 - 1996
- Colonel Oleksandr Mykolaiovych Zashchytnikov 1996 - 1998
- Lieutenant Colonel Yuriy Anatoliovych Garbus 1998 - 1999
- Colonel Andriy Ivanovych Maksymenko 1999 - 2001
- Colonel Ihor Vasyliovych Luniov 2001 - 2003
- Colonel Ihor Yaroslavovych Stelmah 2003 - 2004
- Lieutenant Colonel Volodymyr Vasyliovych Kolchik 2004 - 2006
- Colonel Oleh Volodymyrovych Svystak 2006 - 2007
- Colonel Yuriy Ivanovych Sodol' 2007–2015
- Colonel Oleg Zenchenko 2021-2022 † in Donetsk, 17 March 2022.

== Honours ==
On 23 August 2021, in accordance with the Decree of the President of Ukraine No. 414/2021, the brigade was assigned the honorary name "Sycheslavska". The Decree of the President of Ukraine of 16 July 2002 No. 654 "On assigning the honorary name "Dnipropetrovsk" to 25 Airborne Brigade of the Ground Forces of the Armed Forces of Ukraine" retired its previous name from official use. On 14 October 2021, during Zelenskyy's visit to Zaporizhzhia on the island of Khortytsia, brigade commander Colonel Yevhen Kurash was presented with the brigade's new Regimental Colour. On 28 June 2022, the brigade was awarded the honorary citation "For Courage and Bravery".
