= Sukhi Yaly =

River in Ukraine

Location
- Country: Ukraine
- Oblast: Donetsk Oblast
- Cities: Volnovakha, Velyka Novosilka

Physical characteristics
- Source
  - location: near Syhnalne
  - coordinates: 47°51′01″N 37°38′52″E
- Mouth: Vovcha
  - location: near Kostiantynopil
  - coordinates: 48°00′35″N 37°03′13″E
- Length: 49 km (30 mi)
- Basin size: 697 km^{2} (269 sq mi)

Basin features
- Progression: Vovcha→ Samara→ Dnieper→ Dnieper–Bug estuary→ Black Sea

The Sukhi Yaly (Ukrainian: Сухі Яли; Russian: Сухие Ялы) is a river in western Donetsk Oblast, Ukraine. From its headwaters near the town of Syhnalne, it flows roughly northwest to its confluence with the Vovcha river. The Vovcha then flows into the Dnipro river, making Sukhi Yaly part of the Dnipro basin system.

== History ==
Since 2024, during the Russo-Ukrainian War, the Russian military has been advancing along the river.

== Geography ==
From source to mouth, the river flows through the following settlements: Novomykhailivka, Paraskoviivka, Kostiantynivka, Antonivka, Katerynivka, Illinka, Yelyzavetivka, Romanivka, Hannivka, Veselyi Hai, Uspenivka, Kostiantinopolske, Yantarne, Sukhi Yaly, Zelenivka, Ulakly, and Kostiantynopil.
