= Battle of Marinka (2022–2023) =

2022 and 2023 battle in the Russo-Ukrainian war

- Part of the eastern front of the Russian invasion of Ukraine
Date	18 April 2022 (Note: The exact start date of fighting in the city is unknown.) – 25 December 2023 (Note: The exact day of the city's capture is disputed, as Russian Defense Minister Sergei Shoigu announced the city had been captured on 25 December, while a Ukrainian military spokesperson initially denied the claim. Meanwhile, Ukraine's commander-in-chief Valerii Zaluzhnyi admitted to the city's capture on 26 December, one day later.) (1 year, 8 months and 1 week)
Location	Marinka, Donetsk Oblast, Ukraine
Result	Russian victory

Belligerents
Russia: Donetsk People's Republic (Note: Until the Republic's annexation on 30 September 2022)	Ukraine

Units involved
(Russia) 42nd Guards Motor Rifle Division (Russia) 150th Motor Rifle Division (Russia) 68th Army Corps (Russia) Storm-Z (Russia) Wagner Group (Donetsk People's Republic) 5th Separate Motor Rifle Brigade	(Ukraine) 79th Air Assault Brigade (since August–September 2022) (Ukraine) 2nd Company, 74th Reconnaissance Battalion (part) (Ukraine) Right Sector Ukrainian Volunteer Corps

During the Russo-Ukrainian war, a battle took place between Russian forces and Ukrainian forces for control over the city of Marinka.

The battle was notable for its length and the extent of destruction of the city's infrastructure. By November 2022, much of the city was destroyed, with no civilians remaining and few buildings left standing from the fighting. By December 2023, Russia had captured almost all of Marinka.

On 25 December 2023, Russia said that its forces had fully captured the city, but the Ukrainian military initially denied the claim. Ukraine's commander-in-chief Valerii Zaluzhnyi confirmed the loss of Marinka the next day.

== Background ==
Marinka had been a frontline city held by Ukraine since the beginning of the Russo-Ukrainian War in 2014 and was an important part of the Ukrainian defensive line. Russian Defense Minister Sergei Shoigu had said that since 2014, Ukrainian forces turned Marinka into a "powerful fortified area, which is connected by underground passages. [...] Each street has its own well-fortified and fairly well-protected structures from all attacks, both from the air and artillery, long-term firing points, complex underground communication systems."

On 3 June 2015, Marinka was the site of a short battle between Ukrainian and Donetsk People's Republic (DPR) forces, which ended with Ukraine remaining in control of the city and expelling the separatist fighters. Ukrainian commander Valentin Manko said at the time that if the separatists had made a breakthrough in Marinka, "Ukrainian forces could find themselves in yet another encirclement" akin to the one that occurred at the battle of Debaltseve.

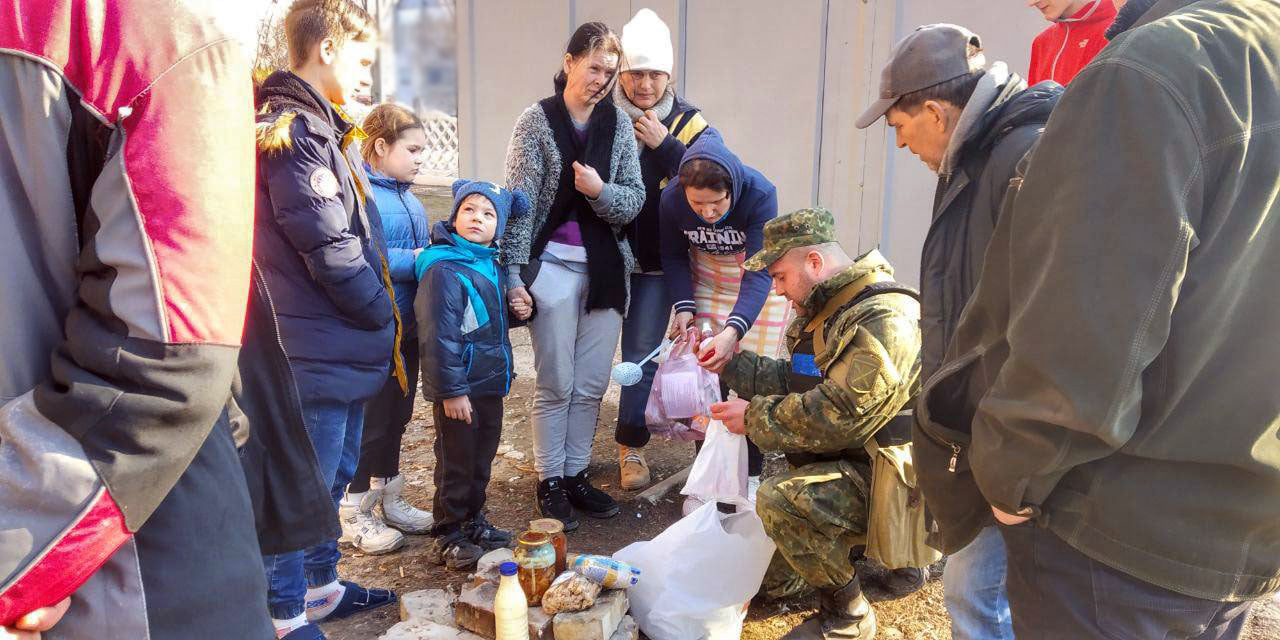
Ukrainian police delivering humanitarian aid to Marinka on 25 March 2022

On 17 February 2022, shelling in Marinka injured a 65-year-old woman. Civilians recounted that shelling on this day had begun around 9:30 am, and ended at 2:30 pm, saying they had heard "at least 20" separate explosions. Shelling intensified in the days leading up to the Russian invasion of Ukraine, killing two Ukrainian soldiers and injuring four more. OSCE recorded a slew of projectiles towards Marinka on 19 February. OSCE monitored 123 explosions south, southwest, and west of Donetsk city in the direction of Marinka on 25 February 2022, just after the full-scale invasion by Russian forces began.

The Russian defence ministry claimed on 17 March that DPR troops had advanced and captured Marinka, Slavne, and Solodke.

Between 30 and 31 March 2022, Ukrainian emergency services extinguished "dozens of fires" that had started in the city because of white phosphorus munitions from Russian forces. On 17 April, one person was killed after Russian forces shelled the city.

== Battle ==
=== Initial Russian assaults ===
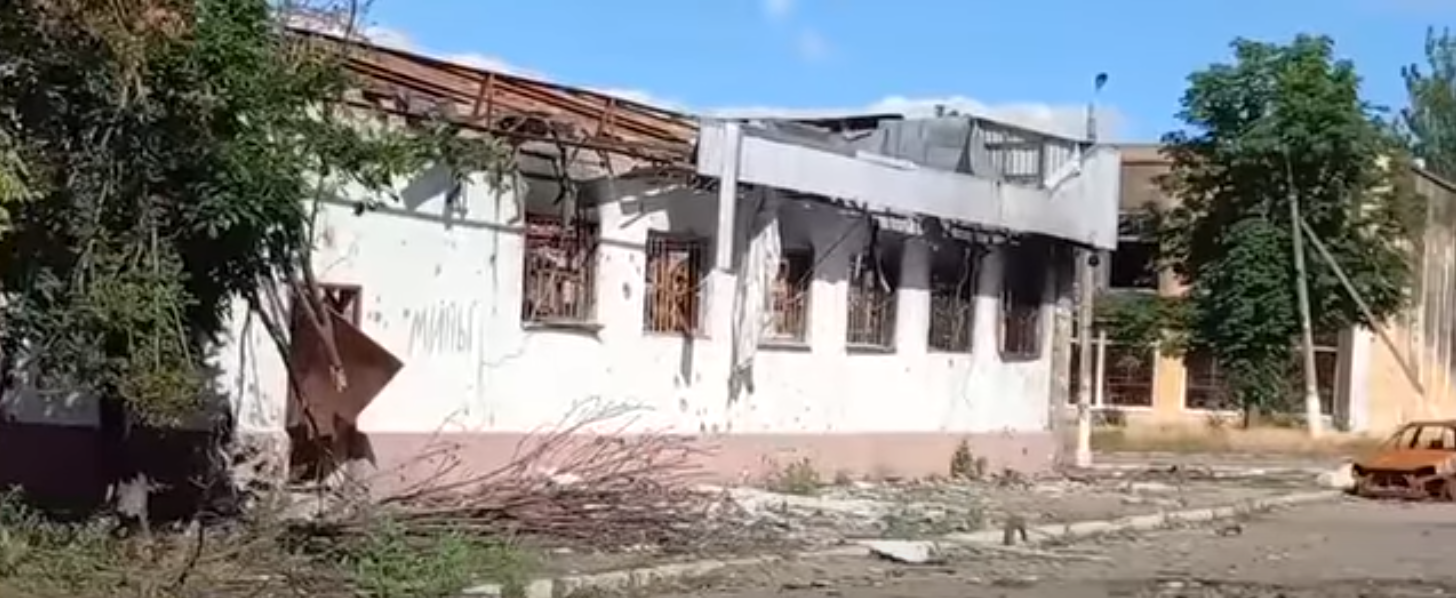
A damaged building in Marinka, June 2022

On 19 April, Ukrainian forces regained control of Marinka after a failed Russian assault the day prior. "Powerful shelling" was reported on the city the same day. Ukrainian forces repelled Russian attacks on the city on 23 April.

The Institute for the Study of War (ISW) reported on 20 May that Russian and DPR forces had refocused their efforts towards Marinka, having allocated additional forces following the end of the siege of Mariupol. Throughout May 2022, fighting took place in the form of "crushing artillery battles aided by drones and snipers", but Russia failed to break through Ukrainian lines.

Fighting intensified from mid-July through early August, with a failed Russian attack on Marinka on 11 July. Two more assaults occurred on 30 July and 1 August, with little success. On 5 August, DPR and Wagner forces claimed to control half of Marinka. Russian forces assaulted Marinka again on 25 August, although made no gains. Throughout August, Russian forces made incremental gains in Marinka. The ISW reported that the frontline in Marinka largely stagnated throughout September. In October, geolocated footage showed Russian troops had advanced around the C051101 highway north of Marinka.

=== Winter 2022–summer 2023 assaults ===
Donetsk Oblast governor Pavlo Kyrylenko stated on 22 December 2022 that Marinka and the surrounding areas were "unlivable," and that there was "not a single surviving house." In January 2023, interviewed Ukrainian soldiers stated that fighting in Marinka was "hellish," and that with virtually no buildings left standing, they were fighting out of basements, rubble, and behind freestanding walls. On 30 January, Ukraine's 79th Brigade claimed it had repelled an infantry assault by a company of Russian troops towards Marinka. According to the Ukrainian General Staff, clashes intensified on 2 February with thirteen battles lasting two hours in Marinka. On 21 February, further Russian assaults on Marinka were reportedly repelled. Analysis by the British Ministry of Defence said that the effects of the Russian winter offensive were inconclusive in Marinka, with only minimal gains made despite "expending significant resources."

On 15 April, Ukrainian general Oleksandr Tarnavskyi released video of six captured Russian soldiers near Marinka. On 24 May, Ukraine's General Staff said Marinka remained one of the epicentres of ongoing clashes during the war.

In June 2023, Ukrainian soldiers on the front in Marinka claimed that Russian soldiers outnumbered Ukrainians 4:1 in manpower, and 6:1 in artillery. Most battles took place at close range, and in basements. Later in June, Russian troops were seen using unmanned VBIEDs using older armoured vehicles to conduct attacks on Ukrainian troops in Marinka. It was reported on 13 July that Ukrainian forces had captured a Russian-held position in the "Zverinets" fortifications southwest of Marinka. Around this time, Russian forces intensified attacks on the settlement. Hanna Maliar, the then-deputy defence minister of Ukraine, stated that the Russians were on the offensive in Marinka in September 2023.

=== Final assaults ===
In October 2023, Ukrainian military officials said that Russian forces were launching renewed attacks across the eastern front, as well as transferring new units and equipment to the Marinka axis. On 7 October, Ukraine's General Staff reported repelling 12 Russian assaults in Marinka while pro-Russian sources reported Russian advances in the city amid clashes near the western outskirts, according to the ISW. On 8 October, Ukrainian military spokesperson Colonel Oleksandr Shtupun said that he believed Russian assaults on Marinka were intended to prevent the transfer of Ukrainian reserves to the Zaporizhia front. Ukrainian military observer Konstyantyn Mashovets reported on 12 October that Russia was concentrating forces of the 68th Army Corps on the Marinka axis.

Daily Russian assaults and positional battles continued into November 2023, with the Ukrainian General Staff claiming to have repelled 20 assaults in the Marinka sector on 3 November. On 9–10 November, Shtupun said Russian forces were concentrating their assaults on Marinka and Novomykhailivka—a fortified village located along Marinka's southern flank—and claimed Storm-Z penal units were participating in the assaults. Russian sources reported ongoing clashes on Marinka's western edge with both the Russian Ministry of Defence and Ukrainian officials reporting increased clashes near Heorhiivka, located immediately west of Marinka. On 22 November, Ukraine's 79th Air Assault Brigade claimed Russian troops had deployed over 300 kamikaze drones and stormed Ukrainian positions in Marinka over 150 times within the past week.

On 1 December, the ISW assessed that Russian forces controlled at least 74 per cent of Marinka according to currently available geolocated combat footage, but that it was possible they realistically controlled more than that amount. Pro-Russian sources claimed Russian forces controlled 90–95 per cent of the city and had pushed Ukrainian forces to the western edges, meanwhile the Ukrainian General Staff reported repelling more front line assaults. On 5 December, the British defence ministry assessed that Russian forces controlled most of the city, with Ukrainian forces still controlling "pockets of territory in the western edge" of the city. On 12 December, geolocated video emerged online of Russian units of the 2nd Rifle Battalion and 163rd Tank Regiment raising a Russian flag at the end of the western side of Kashtanova Street, indicating recent advances south of the Osykova River, which straddled Marinka's northern flank.

On 15 December, pro-Russian sources claimed Russian troops advanced 450 meters westwards north of the Osykova and that Ukraine only controlled two per cent of the settlement. They also claimed that Russian forces were intensifying assaults along Marinka's southern flank, towards Pobieda and Novomykhailivka, meanwhile Ukraine's General Staff reported repelling all assaults on Novomykhailivka and Marinka. On 22 December, Russian military blog Rybar claimed that the "Zverinets" fortification, which Ukrainian troops reportedly recaptured on 13 July, was recaptured by Russian forces amid ongoing ground assaults towards Pobieda and Novomykhailivka.

On 25 December, the Russian Ministry of Defence announced that its forces had fully captured Marinka, however Shtupun denied the claim, insisting that Ukrainian troops remained within the city's administrative borders, without offering further detail. Geolocated footage showed Russian forces had advanced in the last remaining pockets of resistance in the northern sections of the city. The next day, 26 December, Ukrainian commander-in-chief General Valerii Zaluzhny stated Ukrainian forces had retreated to the city's outskirts, "and in some places already beyond the boundaries of the settlement," establishing a new defensive line outside of the city. General Zaluzhny added that Marinka "no longer exists" after being destroyed "street by street" during the battle and that although holding territory was vital, "the lives of our fighters are more important to us," indicating the cost of maintaining positions within the city had become too high.

== Aftermath ==
By early January 2024, Ukrainian military analysts concurred that Ukrainian troops had fallen back to defensive positions outside of Marinka's city limits. However, the Ukrainian military had not officially commented on the capture of Marinka beyond daily battlefield reports. The New York Times reported that Ukrainian officials typically did not directly acknowledge the loss of a city or town, instead referring to their forces as "operating in the vicinity" of a captured settlement.

On 3 January 2024, Ukraine's General Staff stated its troops were fighting "in the vicinities" of Novomykhailivka and Heorhiivka, both villages located south and west of Marinka, respectively. The Institute for the Study of War assessed that by 8 January, Russian forces had "marginally advanced" south of Novomykhailivka and were simultaneously attacking towards Heorhiivka, with the goal of capturing Kurakhove.

== Humanitarian impact and battlefield conditions ==
Marinka was largely reduced to ruins during the battle. Russian forces used the tactic of bombarding the city into rubble using artillery, missile, and airstrikes prior to sending in ground units to wage urban combat, a reportedly advantageous tactic the Russians also deployed during the battles of Sievierodonetsk and Lysychansk. Urban fighting in Marinka was fierce, with Ukrainian and Russian troops fighting street-to-street and destroying houses and apartment buildings to deprive the enemy of cover and fighting positions in tough conditions.

By May 2022, Marinka's city square was completely destroyed, the gilded dome of the local church was partially melted, and the Marinka cultural centre was destroyed. The primary school of the city, Marinka school No.1, and the nearby youth centre, were destroyed sometime before 15 April 2022, with only one wall left standing. The police chief, Artem Schus, stated that every building in the city was damaged.

On 3 November 2022, Ukraine claimed to have evacuated the civilian population of Marinka, totalling around 9,400 people pre-war. Evacuation efforts were done by Ukrainian paramedic group White Angels. This was corroborated by Schus, who claimed living in the city was impossible. In a March 2023 statement, Schus stated the city was "completely destroyed."

On 23 December 2023, Ukrainian Brigadier General Oleksandr Tarnavskyi accused the Russians of "practically" wiping Marinka "off the ground".

While declaring the capture of Marinka on 25 December 2023, Russian defence minister Sergei Shoigu remarked on the city's defences, saying each street was "fairly well protected from all attacks from both the air and field artillery structures, long-term firing points and a complex system of underground communications" as Ukrainian troops had nine years to fortify the settlement. He also stated the capture would reduce Ukrainian shelling of Donetsk city.

On 26 December 2023, Ukrainian commander-in-chief Valerii Zaluzhnyi compared the battle for Marinka to the battle of Bakhmut, saying "Streets, neighborhoods and our fighters are being destroyed, and after that we have what we have."

== Analysis ==
Russian president Vladimir Putin commented that the capture of Marinka provided Russian forces "the opportunity to reach a wider operational area."

The Institute for the Study of War assessed on 26 December 2023 that Russia's "likely" capture of Marinka represented a limited tactical gain but not a significant operational advance, unless Russian forces improved their "ability to conduct rapid mechanized forward movement". The ISW further assessed that Marinka "does not offer Russian forces a secure operational foothold from which to launch further offensive operations" due to the extent of infrastructure damage. It also predicted that Russia's proceeding rate of advance and casualty rates would be similar to what they experienced in Marinka due to new Ukrainian fortifications established outside of the city. Jack Watling, a research fellow at the Royal United Services Institute, a London-based think tank, likewise argued that controlling Marinka was not "particularly significant" strategically, as the sheer amount of destruction from the battle did not allow it to be a critical logistics hub for either army.

Military analyst and retired Ukrainian army colonel Serhiy Hrabsky observed that Russia's capture of Marinka created "potentially significant" operational and strategic concerns for Ukraine. Hrabsky predicted the loss of Marinka would "significantly deteriorate" Ukraine's control of Novomykhailivka—located south of Marinka—and allowed Russian forces to increasingly threaten the northern flank of Vuhledar. However, the battle for Marinka "significantly exhausted the Russian attacking potential," Hrabsky insisted.

The New York Times reported on 4 January 2024 that despite Marinka being in ruins and having limited strategic value, the capture of the city was Russia's most significant territorial advance since capturing Bakhmut in May 2023. According to the Times, the city's capture allowed the Russians to shift focus towards capturing Kurakhove, Vuhledar and Pokrovsk as part of the larger objective of capturing the entire Donbas. Furthermore, the loss of Marinka was also a symbolic loss for Ukraine's military, which had not recaptured any large population centres throughout 2023 as its summer counteroffensive stalled by the end of the year.

== See also ==
- List of military engagements during the Russo-Ukrainian war (2022–present)
- Battle of Avdiivka (2023–2024)
- Battle of Pisky
