= 79th Air Assault Brigade =

Ukrainian Air Assault Forces unit

79th Air Assault Brigade (2016–present) 79th Airmobile Brigade (2007–2016) 79th Airmobile Regiment (1993–2007) 40th Airmobile Brigade (1990–1993) 40th Air Assault Brigade (1979–1993)
- Ukrainian: 79-та окрема десантно-штурмова Таврійська бригада
- 79th Air Assault Brigade shoulder sleeve patch
- Active: 1979–present
- Country: Soviet Union (1979–1991); Ukraine (1992–present)
- Allegiance: Armed Forces of Ukraine
- Branch: Ukrainian Air Assault Forces
- Role: Air Assault
- Size: Brigade
- Part of: 7th Rapid Response Corps
- Garrison/HQ: Soliany Mykolaiv Oblast; MUN А0224
- Mottos: "In Unity is Power" "В єднанні - сила!"
- Engagements: Russo–Ukrainian War; War in Donbas; Russian invasion of Ukraine; Southern front; Battle of Mykolaiv; Eastern front; Battle of Sievierodonetsk; Battle of Kurakhove; Pokrovsk offensive
- Decorations: For Courage and Bravery

Commanders
- Current commander: Colonel Oleksandr Lutsenko

The 79th Air Assault Brigade "Tavria" (Ukrainian: 79-та окрема десантно-штурмова Таврійська бригада; 79 ОДШБр) (MUN A0224) is a formation of the Ukrainian Air Assault Forces. The paratrooper brigade is based in Mykolaiv.

Soldiers from the brigade have served as peacekeepers in Yugoslavia, Iraq, Kosovo, and Sierra Leone.

Starting in 2014, the brigade took part in the war in Donbas. The brigade fought in the Second Battle of Donetsk Airport, where it and other Ukrainian military units became known as the "cyborgs" due to their stubborn defense of the Donetsk Airport.

== History ==
The brigade's history began as 40th Air Assault Brigade in the fall of 1979, formed from elements of the 97th Guards Airborne Regiment of the 7th Guards Airborne Division. Later it was reorganized into the 40th Airborne Brigade between 6 December 1989 and 1 August 1990 (1 June 1990 according to Holm). That redesignation marked the transfer of the brigade from the Odessa Military District to the Soviet Airborne Troops.

In February 1992 following the collapse of the Soviet Union, the brigade went over to Ukrainian control, against the wishes of its commander V. N. Loginov and without Moscow's knowledge. The brigade's soldiers had become frustrated over lapses in food and pay due to Russo-Ukrainian disputes over Soviet military unit upkeep, and decided that shifting to Ukrainian command would end those issues. In September 1993 the brigade was renamed 40th Separate Airmobile Brigade.

The 40th Brigade was reorganized and reduced into the 79th Airmobile Regiment.

On July 1, 2007, the brigade was formed by combining the 79th Airmobile Regiment with 11th Army Aviation Regiment.

In 2014, the brigade took part in the fighting of the war in Donbas. 54 persons called up for mobilization (and thus serving in the brigade) deserted.

=== Russian annexation of Crimea and war in Donbas ===
Pro-Russian protesters blocked the unit's base in Voznesensk on 1 March 2014 and a platoon of soldiers was sent to reinforce and secure the military equipment located at the facility from looting. The protest was resolved without violent clashes. Other than Spetsnaz forces of Ukraine, the unit was one of the first to be mobilized during the annexation of Crimea by the Russian Federation and the war in Donbas by being deployed to the Crimean-Kherson border in order to prevent Russian forces from a possible advance into mainland Kherson Oblast on 13 March 2014. On March 26 Ukrainian forces secured the Russian Mars-75 naval navigation station located in Kherson Oblast.

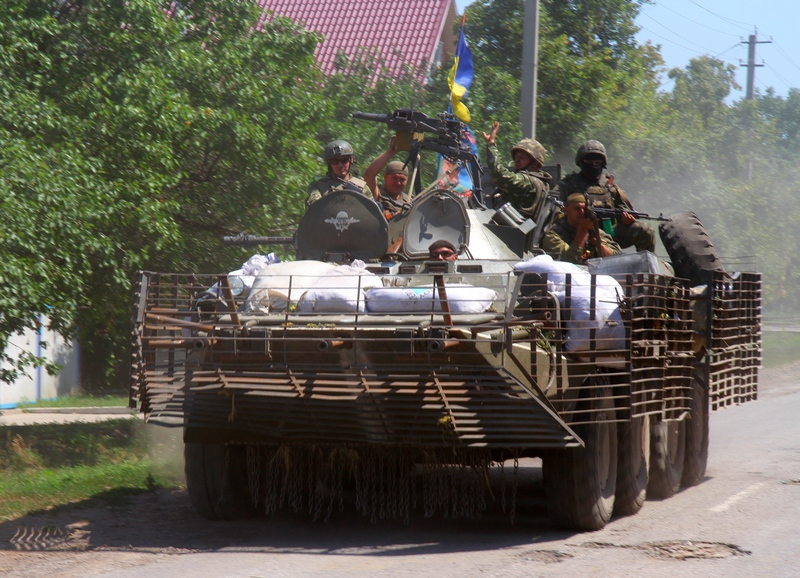
79th Airmobile Brigade soldiers during the War in Donbas, July 2014

The unit was deployed to Donbas in May 2014 and fought in a battle in Shakhtarsk Raion where it held the objective of securing both the Russian border and the strategic Savur-Mohyla hill. The unit, along with the 72nd Mechanized Brigade became trapped in southern Luhansk Oblast as pro-Russian forces cut their supply lines from the bulk of Ukrainian force in July. Ukrainian forces attempted to keep the units resupplied delivering 15 tons of supplies through enemy lines to the unit. The 79th Airmobile Brigade was able to break through enemy lines on 7 August 2014 along with much of their equipment, however it was reported that the unit was severely short on ammunition and would likely not be able to continue holding its positions if it did not break through the encirclement. Due to spending a month surrounded by enemy forces the unit was sent back to its home station in order to regroup.

The unit was redeployed after a month of R&R to hold the southern Donetsk Oblast in the Mariupol and Donetsk regions. In September the unit joined the 3rd Separate Spetsnaz Regiment along with National Guard units in the defense of Donetsk Airport. Due to their stubborn resistance during the defense of Donetsk Airport they were referred to as "cyborgs".

In 2016, after the brigade received a company of T-80 tanks, the 79th Airmobile Brigade became 79th Air Assault Brigade.

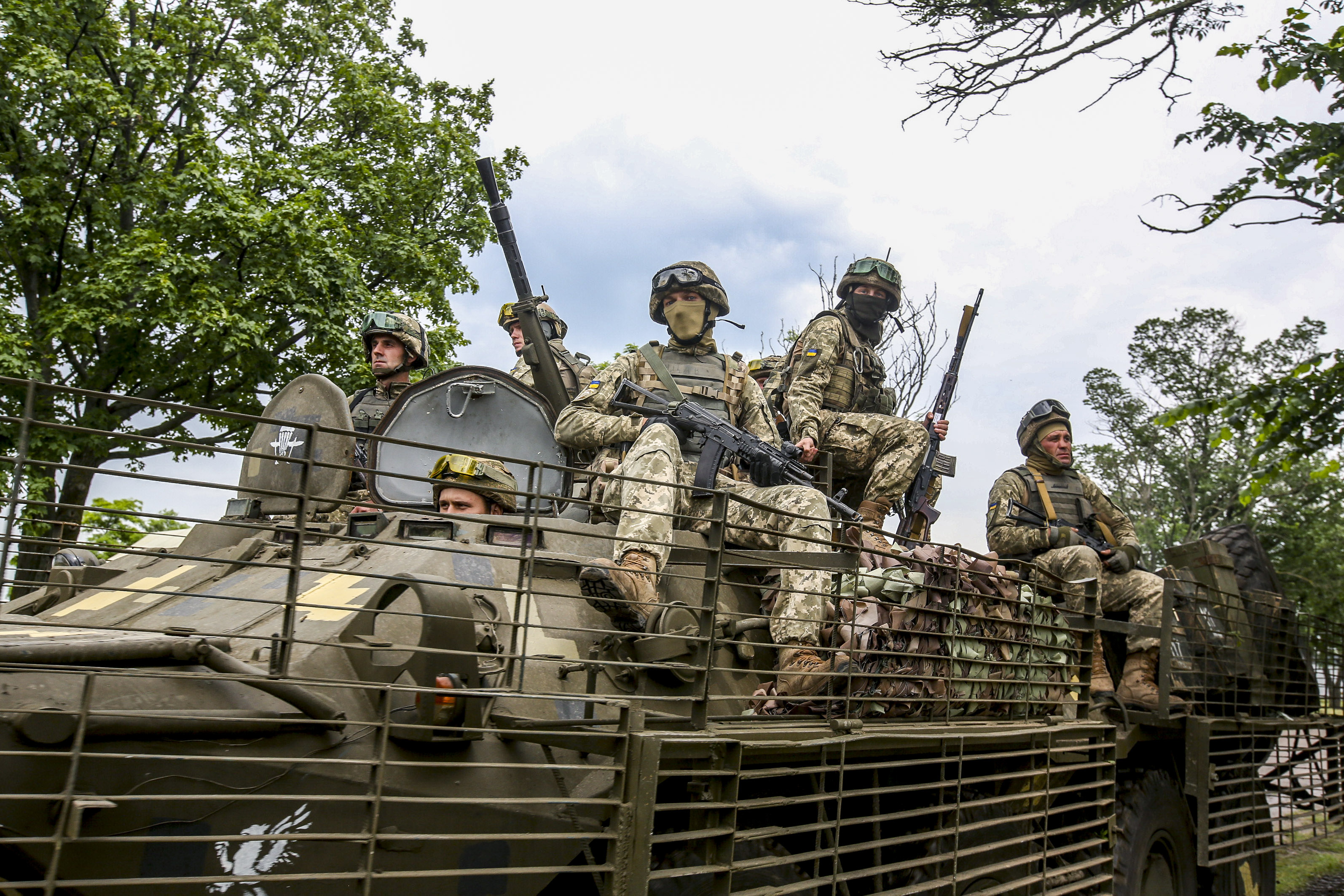
Soldiers of the 79th Air Assault Brigade on BTR-80 after modernization programs, June 2016

=== Russian invasion of Ukraine ===
The main units of the 79th Brigade were in the Donbas at the onset of the Russian invasion of Ukraine; only 120 of the brigade's men were stationed at the unit's military base in Mykolaiv when the fighting reached that city. The majority of the 79th Brigade was positioned at Stanytsia Luhanska and Shchastia in the Luhansk Oblast at the time. It would later take up the defense of Trokhizbenka, Raihorodka, Bakhmutivka, Novoaidar, and Sievierodonetsk; the brigade was forced to retreat towards Sievierodonetsk in order to avoid encirclement.

On 7–9 March 2022, the brigade's base in Mykolaiv was struck by Russian Hurricane missiles. Dozens of Ukrainian servicemen died in the bombing.

In late May 2022, it was reported that units of the brigade were defending the Holy Mountains National Nature Park south of the city of Lyman, attempting to prevent Russian forces from crossing the Siverskyi Donets River. In July 2022, it was reported that units of the brigade had taken part in combat on the Sloviansk front, near Sviatohirsk, alongside Ukraine's 81st Brigade.

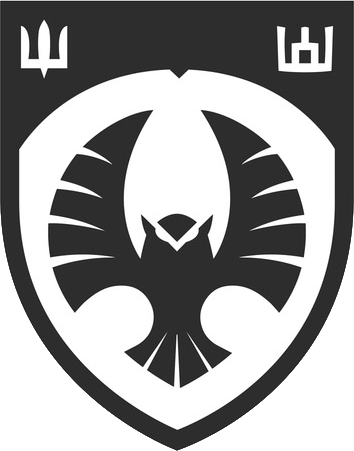
Emblem of the 1st Separate Air Assault Company "Belarus"

In June 2023, Valery Sakhashchyk, effective defence minister of the Belarusian United Transitional Cabinet (a government-in-exile opposed to the de facto government of Alexander Lukashenko) informed about the creation of the 1st Separate Air Assault Company "Belarus", which is part of the 79th Air Assault Brigade. The Belarusian assault company is located in the Donetsk direction and is the reserve of the commander of one of the separate assault brigades.

==== Operations in southern Donetsk Oblast (2024–present) ====
Ukrainian commander-in-chief Oleksandr Syrskyi publicly praised the 79th Brigade in March 2024 for its efforts in repelling Russian attacks on the village of Novomykhailivka. As of July 2024, the brigade was continuing to defend near Novomykhailivka.

On both 24 and 29 July 2024, the brigade repelled two Russian assaults in Donetsk Oblast, with 200 troops and 57 armored vehicles for each assault. They claimed to have destroyed several dozen armored vehicles and to have killed over a hundred Russian soldiers and "leaving more of them wounded". In mid-August 2024, the brigade claimed to have destroyed another Russian column near Novomykhailivka, with the assistance of the 471st Infantry Battalion.

On 1 October 2024, the brigade repelled another Russian assault near Kurakhove, destroying 19 units of equipment, including four tanks and two AFVs. 23 Russians were claimed to have been killed, with another 23 wounded. On 17 October it was reported that the brigade was defending the village of Kostiantynivka.

In early November 2024, David Axe claimed that the 79th Brigade, which he described as "battered", was "barely holding on" to its defensive line in the village of Illinka 6 miles (9.7 km) south of the city of Kurakhovo, and speculated that if Illinka fell, Kurakhovo would likely fall as well.

Elements fought in the Pokrovsk - Myrnohrad area.

== Structure ==
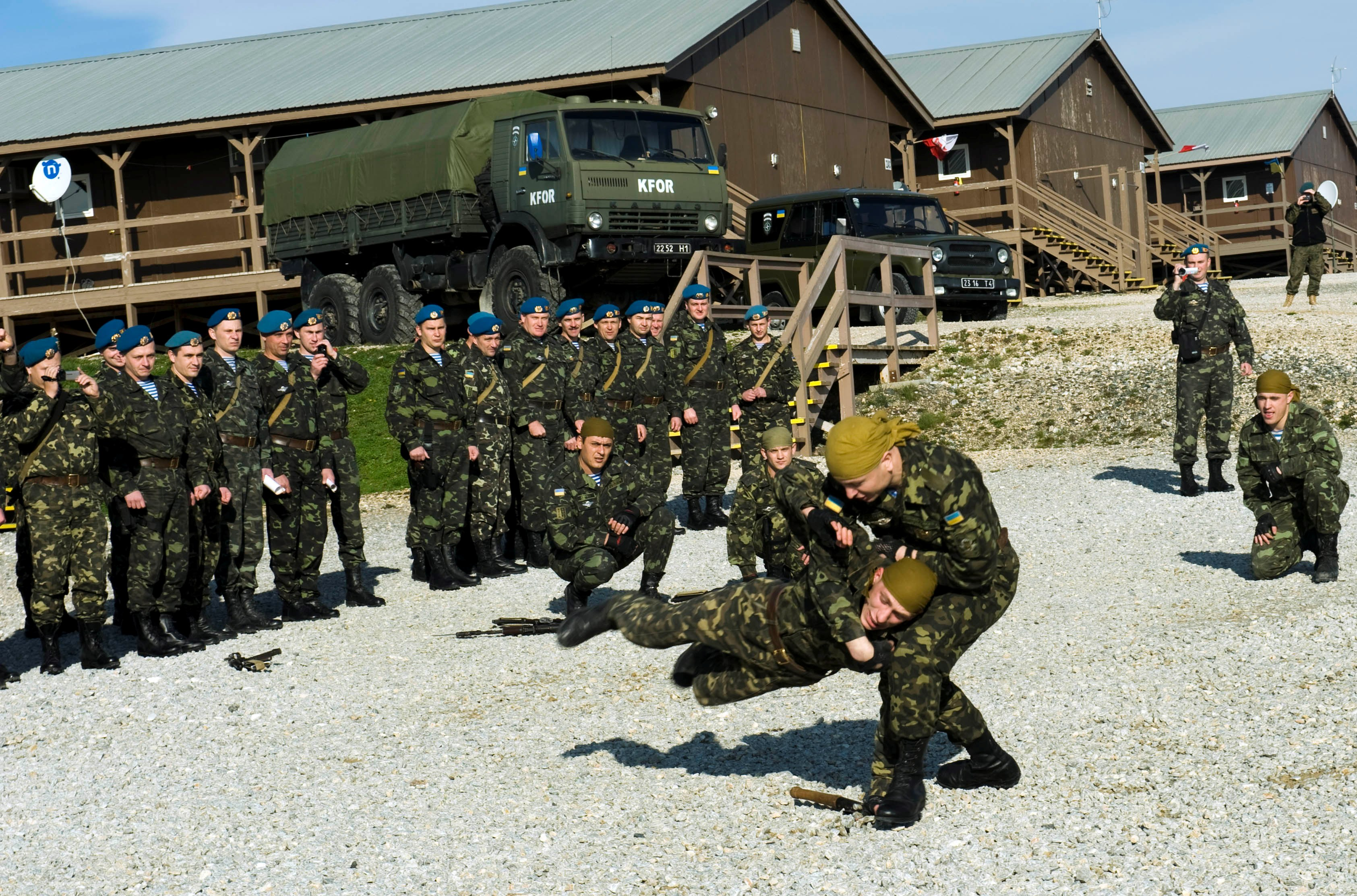
Soldiers of the 79th Airmobile Brigade (during the KFOR mission)

Until summer of 2007 the formation was a regiment. In 2008 the brigade was being manned by contract soldiers.

=== Until 2007 ===
- 1st Battalion
- 2nd Battalion

=== Current structure ===
As of 2024, the brigade's structure is as follows:

- 79th Air Assault Brigade, Mykolaiv
  - Headquarters Company
  - 1st Air Assault Battalion
  - 2nd Air Assault Battalion
  - 3rd Air Assault Battalion "Phoenix". (Created on August 12, 2014 by Yurii Biriukov)
  - 1st Air Assault Company "Belarus". Formed by Belarusian volunteers.
  - Tank Company
  - 79th Artillery Regiment
    - Headquarters & Target Acquisition Battery
    - Self-propelled Artillery Battalion (2S1 Gvozdika)
    - Howitzer Artillery Battalion (2A18 D-30)
    - Rocket Artillery Battalion (BM-21 Grad)
  - Attack Drone Company "Perun Group"
  - Anti-Aircraft Battery
  - Reconnaissance Company
  - Engineering and Sapper Company
  - Chemical, Biological, Radiological and Nuclear Defense Company
  - Material Support Company
  - Amphibious Support Company
  - Maintenance Company
  - Medical Company
  - Communication Company
  - Proving Grounds

== Past commanders ==
- Lieutenant Colonel Oleksii Atroshchenko — 1992—1993
- Colonel Petro Zeleniak — 1993—1996
- Colonel Shamil Kuliiev — 1996—1998
- Colonel Anatolii Bakhtin — 1998—1999
- Colonel Vitalii Pasiura — 1999—2002
- Colonel Kostiantyn Maslienikov — 2002–2005
- Colonel Volodymyr Khoruzhyi — 2005—2007
- Colonel Kostiantyn Maslienikov — 2007—2011
- Colonel Yurii Kliat — 2011—2012
- Colonel Oleksii Shandar — 2012—2016
- Colonel Valerii Kurach — 2016—2019
- Colonel Oleksandr Lutsenko — 2019—2022
- Colonel Sviatoslav Zaits — 2022—2024
- Colonel Yevhen Shmataliuk — 2023—2024
- Colonel Eduard Kolodii — from 2024

== Sources ==
- Feskov, V.I.; Golikov, V.I.; Kalashnikov, K.A.; Slugin, S.A. (2013). Вооруженные силы СССР после Второй Мировой войны: от Красной Армии к Советской [The Armed Forces of the USSR after World War II: From the Red Army to the Soviet] (in Russian). Vol. 1 Land Forces. Tomsk: Tomsk University Press. ISBN 9785895035306.
- (in Russian) Unofficial website of VDV
- 40th independent Landing-Assault Brigade - 40th Independent Landing-Assault Brigade
- UNIAN: News of Ukraine this year - the last days in Ukraine
