= Bazhane Pershe =

Bazhane Pershe Бажане Перше
- Village
- Interactive map of Bazhane Pershe
- Location of Bazhane Pershe within Ukraine Bazhane Pershe (Donetsk Oblast)
- Coordinates: 48°04′31″N 37°25′23″E
- Country: Ukraine
- Oblast: Donetsk Oblast
- Raion: Pokrovsk Raion
- Hromada: Marinka urban hromada
- Elevation: 126 m (413 ft)

Population (2001 census)
  - Total: 192
- Time zone: UTC+2 (EET)
  - Summer (DST): UTC+3 (EEST)
- Postal code: 85621
- Area code: +380 6278
- KATOTTH: UA14160130070038805

Bazhane Pershe (Ukrainian: Бажане Перше), formerly known as Zhelanne Pershe (until 10 April 2024), is a village in Marinka urban hromada, Pokrovsk Raion, Donetsk Oblast, eastern Ukraine. It is located 28.96 kilometres (17.99 mi) west by north (WbN) from the centre of Donetsk city.

== Geography ==
The village lies on the left bank of the Vovcha river. The absolute height is 126 metres above sea level.

== History ==
=== Russian invasion of Ukraine ===
The village was captured by Russian Forces in October 2024, during the full-scale Russian invasion of Ukraine.

== Demographics ==
As of the 2001 Ukrainian census, the settlement had 192 inhabitants, whose native languages were 84.90% Ukrainian and 15.10% Russian.
