= 1st Separate Air Assault Company "Belarus" =

1st separate air assault company "Belarus"
- Belarusian: 1-я асобная дэсантна-штурмавая рота «Беларусь» Ukrainian: 1-ша окрема десантно-штурмова рота «Білорусь»
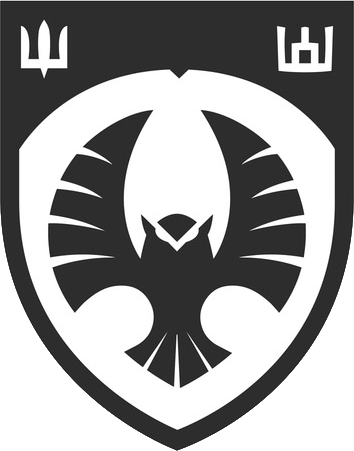
- Active: Spring 2023 – Summer 2024
- Country: Ukraine
- Allegiance: 79th Air Assault Brigade
- Size: Foreign volunteer Company
- Engagements: 2022 Russian Invasion of Ukraine: Battle of Marinka; 2023 Ukrainian counteroffensive
- Website: Official Telegram channel

The 1st Separate Air Assault Company "Belarus" (Belarusian: 1-я асобная дэсантна-штурмавая рота «Беларусь», 1 ОДШР) was an assault company formed of Belarusian volunteers within the 79th Air Assault Brigade of the Ukrainian Air Assault Forces. The unit took part in the Battle of Marinka and consists of around 30 fighters.

The creation of the company was announced for the first time by Valery Sakhashchyk, the effective defence minister of the Belarusian United Transitional Cabinet of Sviatlana Tsikhanouskaya, in June 2023.

In an interview with the online publication "My Country is Belarus", a volunteer with the call sign "Rukh" reported that the unit ceased to exist in the summer of 2024.

== History ==
According to Sakhashchyk, the unit consisted of military professionals, primarily people with combat experience and officer ranks. The company included former fighters of the Kastuś Kalinoŭski Regiment, the Pahonia Regiment and the 2nd International Legion.

The company developed in three directions — attack aircraft, heavy weapons and drones. The position of the first commander of the company was taken by a Belarusian officer with the call sign "Phoenix", who was seriously wounded at the end of spring. The subsequently appointed commander was a former member of a Belarusian special force.

The company was supported by a number of private sponsors and the organization Prague Support Team.

== Awards ==
On September 8, 2023, the Rada of the Belarusian Democratic Republic in exile awarded six people from the 1st separate air assault company with the Military Virtue Medal. The ceremony took place on September 27. Valery Sakhashchyk presented the awards to the fighters.

In October 2023, a fighter of the 1st separate air assault company "Belarus" with the call sign "Ryzhy" was awarded the badge "For Courage and Bravery".

== Reaction of the Belarusian authorities ==
On September 12, 2023, the court of the Central District of Minsk designated the Telegram channel of the 1st separate air assault company "Belarus" as "extremist material".
