= Yakov Maskalevsky =

Ukrainian rebel otaman

Otaman Yakov Maskalevsky
- Яків Маскалевський
- Born: Katerynivka, Bakhmutsky, Katerynlosav, Russian Empire
- Died: 1922; Ukrainian Soviet Socialist Republic
- Military career
- Allegiance: Russian Empire (1914-1917); Makhnovshchina (1918-1922)
- Service: Imperial Russian Army (1914-1917); Revolutionary Insurgent Army of Ukraine (1918-1922)
- Service years: 1914–1922
- Rank: Ensign
- Nickname: Golden Tooth
- Conflicts: World War I Ukrainian War of Independence

Yakov "Golden Tooth" Maskalevsky was a Ukrainian rebel ataman and a member of the Makhnovist movement.

== Biography ==
Yakov was born in the village of Katerynivka. He was enlisted during World War I and he eventually became a full cavalier of St. George and promoted to the rank of praporshchik. After the end of the war in 1918, he worked as a miner, where he began to participate in the revolutionary actions of anarchist groups. He organized a detachment of 600-700 sabers and 30-40 tachanka, which fought against both the Red Army and White Army. Moskalevsky was nicknamed the "Golden Tooth" by the White Guards.

While Nestor Makhno briefly joined the Red Army, Maskalevsky continued to fight against the Bolsheviks, he dispersed their organizations and distributed land to the peasants. With his detachment, the otaman participated in battles near Huliaipole and Oleksandrivsk, and was noted for bravery by Makhno himself. In 1920-1921, the detachment began to disintegrate, the fighters despaired of victory and began to disperse to their homes, for most of them wives and old parents were waiting.

On 22 March 1921 a Golden Tooth detachment of 150 people with 3 machine guns went to Yeysk on the ice of the Sea of Azov, and part remained in the Mariupol district and awaited the arrival of Viktor Belash. With the arrival of the latter, the rebels joined him.

On 13 July 1921 a Golden Tooth detachment knocked the 2nd company of the 90th battalion of the Cheka out of the village of Maryevka. Being defeated, the Bolsheviks retreated to the Voznesensky mine. On the same day, Yakov's detachment of 300 sabers with 10 machine guns joined Makhno. Leaving a detachment of 150 sabers and 100 bayonets in Maryevka, Yakov went to Novo-Mikhailovka, which he also occupied. Then, together with Makhno, he moved in a southeastern direction to the Taganrog district, Donetsk province.

Until 1922, Maskalevsky had 250-300 rebels in his detachment. At the end of 1922 the otaman was captured and, while trying to escape from prison, was killed.

== Bibliography ==
- Belash, A. V.; Belash, V. F. (1993). Дороги Нестора Махно. Kyiv: RVTs "Proza". ISBN 978-5-7707-3814-8.
- Danilov, V.; Shanin, T. (2006). Нестор Махно. Крестьянское движение на Украине. 1918—1921. Документы и материалы. Moscow: ROSSPEN. p. 1000.
