= 3rd Air Assault Battalion =

- 3-й десантно-штурмовий батальйон «Фенікс»
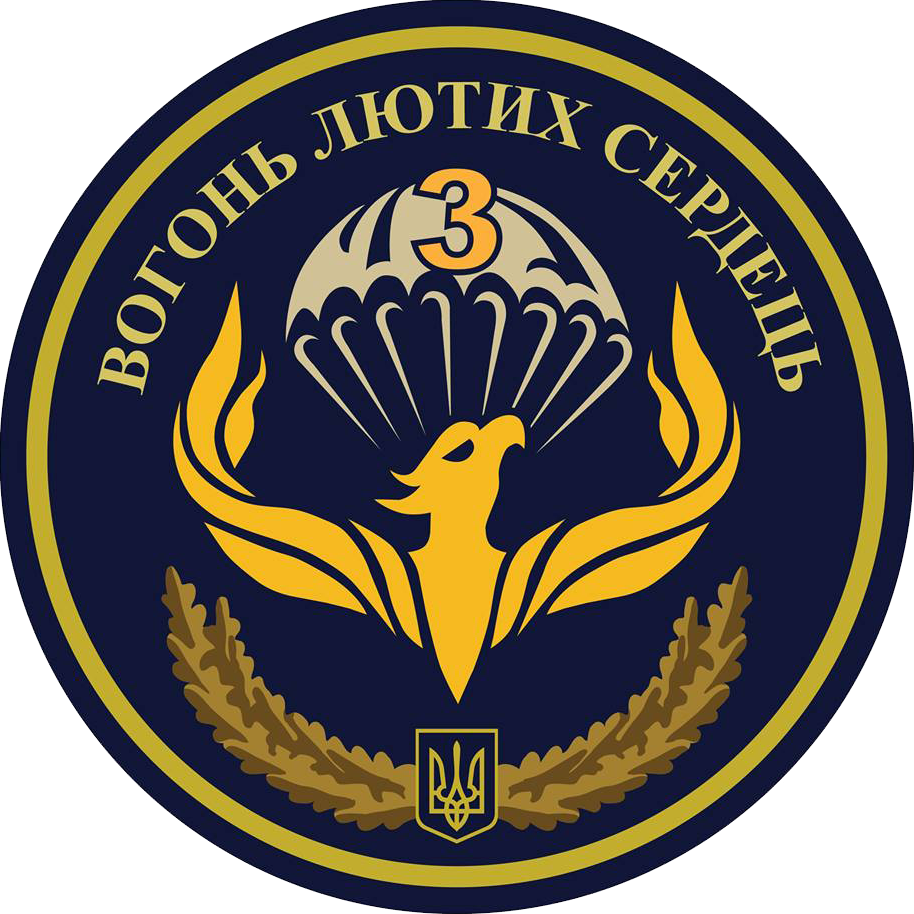
- Battalion Insignia
- Active: 2014-present
- Country: Ukraine
- Branch: Ukrainian Air Assault Forces
- Type: Battalion
- Role: Aerial Assault
- Size: 546 personnel
- Part of: 79th Air Assault Brigade
- Garrison/HQ: Mykolaiv
- Nickname: Phoenix Battalion
- Motto: Fire of fierce hearts
- Engagements: Russo-Ukrainian War: War in Donbass; 2022 Russian Invasion of Ukraine

Commanders
- Current commander: Major Roman Kasianchuk

3rd Separate Air Assault Battalion "Phoenix" is a battalion of the Ukrainian Air Assault Forces and is subordinated to the 79th Air Assault Brigade. It was established in 2014 as a volunteer formation. It has seen combat in multiple battles during the War in Donbass and the Russo-Ukrainian war including the Shyrokyne standoff, during which it faced significant casualties.

== History ==
The battalion's establishment started on 14 August 2014 with the recruitment of volunteer personnel and its equipment was brought from donations by organisations, corporations and civilians of Mykolaiv in addition to ten BTR-80 being transferred to the battalion from the Separate Presidential Brigade.

In November 2014, the battalion was transferred to the ATO zone in Mariupol, participating in battles near Hranitne and Shyrokyne, directing artillery strikes that destroyed a large scale separatist warehouse in Hranitne containing significant amounts of equipment. as well as providing assistance to the local civilians, organization of a first aid station and a heating system. Its responsibility area also included the coast of Sea of Azov and Port of Mariupol. In November 2014 the first platoon of the battalion defeated a large column of separatists and the next day a large concentration of separatists disrupting the separatist attack on Mariupol, the first and second platoons also destroyed four BM-21 Grad missile launchers that fired on the outskirts of Mariupol on 24 January 2015. The battalion also saw intensive combat during the Shyrokyne standoff, before the onset of full on hostilities, on 4 February 2015, the battalion conducted a search and strike operation near Shyrokyne with a group of soldiers entering Shyrokyne but they were ambushed fired upon by ATGMs and small arms, a grenade launcher struck their vehicle killing two soldiers of the battalion (Bohdan Vasyliovych Havelia and Oleksandr Mykhailovych Zaichenko) and multiple personnel were wounded. The battalion was also simultaneously operating in Pisky where a soldier (Mykhailo Mykhailovych Hubrichenko) was killed dur to Mortar fire by separatists on the battalion's positions. On 21 February 2015, Shyrokyne was under attack by separatists using mortars and even tanks, the reconnaissance unit of the battalion was ambushed and a soldier (Yevsyukov Oleksandr Evgenovich) was killed, an operation was carried out the next day to relieve the encircled unit during which another soldier (Vakoliuk Volodymyr Pavlovych) was killed in action.

In April 2016, it was deployed to Marinka with its positions being shelled with heavy weapons on 16 April 2016 during which the battalion lost a lot of equipment and two soldiers were wounded.

On 13 December 2018, while operating in the territory of Joint Forces Operation, a soldier of the battalion (Viktor Kuropiatnyk) was killed by separatist sniper fire.

== Structure ==
The current structure of the battalion is as follows:

- 1st Amphibious Assault Company
- 2nd Amphibious Assault Company
- 3rd Amphibious Assault Company
- Mortar battery
- Howitzer battery
- Fire Support Company
- Anti-aircraft Artillery Platoon
- Anti-aircraft missile Platoon
- Reconnaissance platoon
- Sniper platoon
- Communications department
- UAV department
- Engineering and Technical Platoon
- Headquarter Platoon
- Medical center

== Commanders ==
- Major Semen Koleyinyk
- Lieutenant Colonel Serhii Pochtarenko
- Major Roman Kasianchuk

== Equipment ==
- BTR-70s
- BTR-80s
- Kalashnikov rifles
- PK machine guns
- NSV machine guns
- AGS-30
- D-30 122 mm howitzer 2A18s
- Infantry fighting vehicles
- Reconnaissance Vehicles

== Sources ==
- На базі 79-ї бригади формується новий батальйон «Фенікс» із 529 бійців
- Легендарні частини нашої Армії: 79-а Миколаївська десантна бригада
- Добровольці-десантники — батальйон «Фенікс»
- Комбата легендарного «Феніксу» звинувачують в тому, що в бою не загинув жоден боєць
