= Bazhane Druhe =

Bazhane Druhe Бажане Друге
- Village
- Interactive map of Bazhane Druhe
- Location of Bazhane Druhe within Ukraine Bazhane Druhe (Donetsk Oblast)
- Coordinates: 48°03′26″N 37°25′10″E
- Country: Ukraine
- Oblast: Donetsk Oblast
- Raion: Pokrovsk Raion
- Hromada: Marinka urban hromada
- Elevation: 126 m (413 ft)

Population (2001 census)
  - Total: 240
- Time zone: UTC+2 (EET)
  - Summer (DST): UTC+3 (EEST)
- Postal code: 85621
- Area code: +380 6278
- KATOTTH: UA14160130060059202

Bazhane Druhe (Ukrainian: Бажане Друге), known until 26 September 2024 as Zhelanne Druhe (Желанне Друге), is a village in Marinka urban hromada, Pokrovsk Raion, Donetsk Oblast, eastern Ukraine. It is located 28.69 kilometres (17.83 mi) west by north (WbN) from the centre of Donetsk city.

== Geography ==
The village lies on the left bank of the Vovcha river. The absolute height is 126 metres above sea level.

== History ==
=== Russian invasion of Ukraine ===
The village was captured by Russian forces in October 2024, during the full-scale Russian invasion of Ukraine.

== Demographics ==
In 2001 the settlement had 240 inhabitants, whose native languages were 86.25% Ukrainian and 13.75% Russian.
