= Maksymilianivka =

Maksymilianivka Максимільянівка
- Village
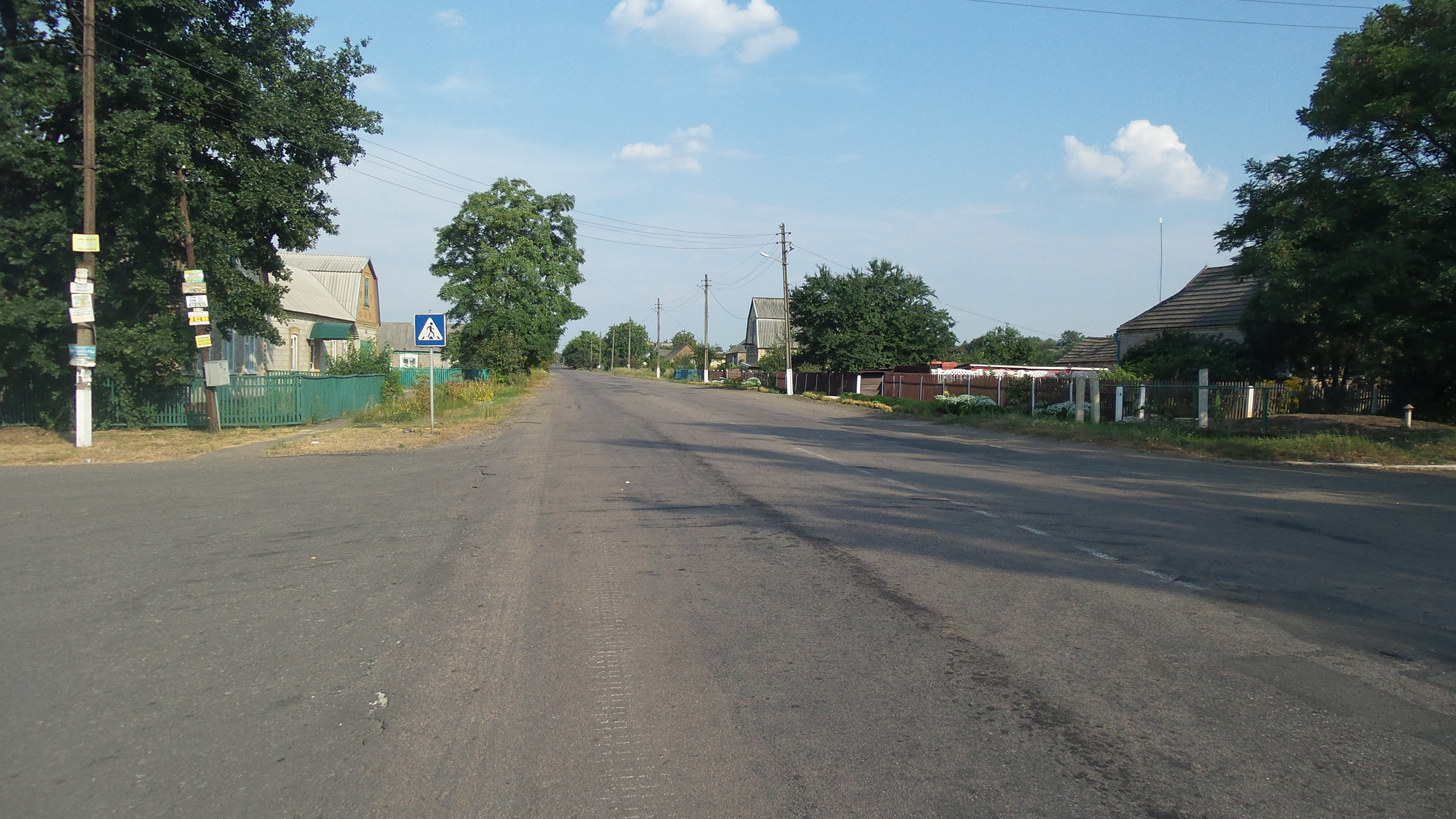
- A road in Maksymilianivka

- Maksymilianivka shown within Ukraine Maksymilianivka shown within Donetsk
- Coordinates: 47°58′25″N 37°23′18″E
- Country: Ukraine
- Oblast: Donetsk Oblast
- Raion: Pokrovsk Raion
- Hromada: Marinka urban hromada
- Founded: 1863
- Elevation: 134 m (440 ft)

Population
  - Total: 2,171
- Postal code: 85622
- Area code: +380 6278
- Website: maksymilyanivka.rada.arhiv.org.ua

Maksymilianivka is a village in Marinka urban hromada, Pokrovsk Raion, Donetsk Oblast, Ukraine. The population was 2,171 in the 2001 Ukrainian census.

== History ==
The village was founded in 1863.

=== Russian invasion of Ukraine ===
The village is currently on the frontline in the Russo-Ukrainian War and has come under Russian artillery fire multiple times, which has caused damage to buildings in the settlement and at least one civilian injury. It became contested between Russia and Ukraine on 14 June 2024 when Russian troops entered the eastern outskirts of the village. On 17 October 2024, Russian forces claimed to have captured the village. This was confirmed on 20 October.

== Demographics ==
According to the 2001 Ukrainian census, the population of the village was 2,171, of which 91.52% stated Ukrainian to be their native language, and 8.15% stated their native language to be Russian.
