= Heorhiivka, Pokrovsk Raion, Donetsk Oblast =

Heorhiivka Георгіївка
- Village
- Heorhiivka shown within Ukraine Heorhiivka shown within Donetsk
- Coordinates: 47°57′44″N 37°26′44″E
- Country: Ukraine
- Oblast: Donetsk Oblast
- Raion: Pokrovsk Raion
- Hromada: Marinka urban hromada
- Elevation: 134 m (440 ft)

Population
  - Total: 1,167
- Postal code: 85623
- Area code: +380 6278

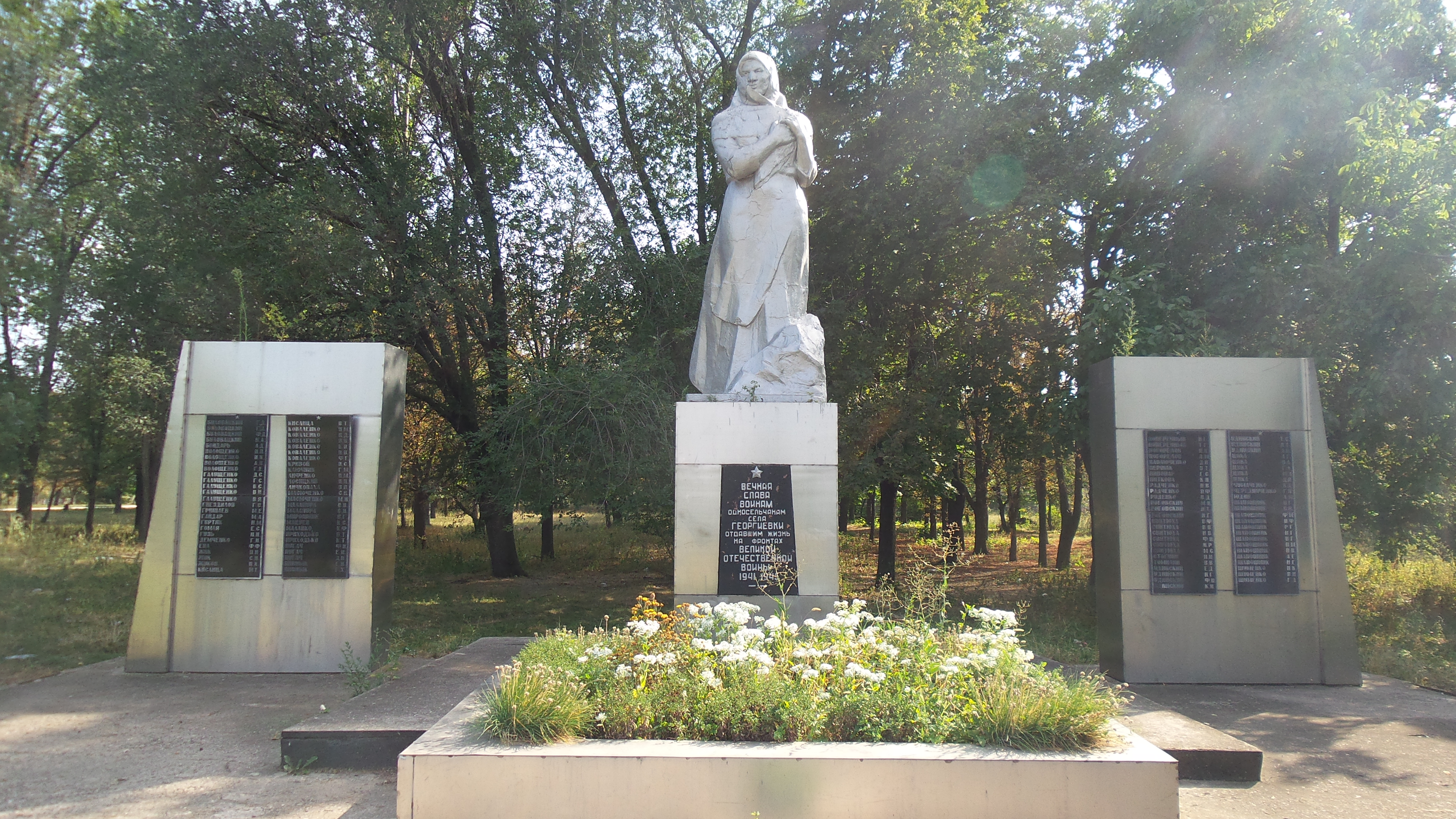
Heorgievka village, Maryinskyi district, Donetsk region.

Heorhiivka (Ukrainian: Георгіївка) is a village in Marinka urban hromada, Pokrovsk Raion, Donetsk Oblast, Ukraine. The population was 1,167 in the 2001 Ukrainian census.

== History ==
The village was established in 1864.

On November 7 1917, in accordance with the Third Universal of the Ukrainian Central Rada, it became part of the Ukrainian People's Republic.

=== Russo-Ukrainian War ===
==== Russian invasion of Ukraine ====
After the end of the Battle of Marinka, the Russian Armed Forces launched multiple attacks against Heorhiivka resulting in its capture on 14 June 2024.

== Demographics ==
Native languages in Heorhiivka
	percent
Ukrainian	92.68%
Russian	5.74%
Belarusian	0.17%
Armenian	0.17%
Greek	0.086%
Others	0.086%
