= Katerynivka, Donetsk Oblast =

Katerynivka Катеринівка
- Village
- Location within Ukraine Location within Donetsk Oblast
- Coordinates: 47°52′31″N 37°20′32″E
- Country: Ukraine
- Oblast: Donetsk Oblast
- Raoin: Pokrovsk Raion
- Hromada: Marinka urban hromada
- Established: 1700

Government
  - Mayor: Melyus Volodymyr Ilyich
- Elevation: 135 m (443 ft)

Population (2021)
  - Total: 306
- Postal code: 85652
- Area code: +380 6278

Katerynivka (Ukrainian: Катеринівка) is a village in Pokrovsk Raion, Donetsk Oblast, Ukraine.

== Geography ==
It is located on the left bank of the Sukhi Yaly. The distance to the district center is about 16 km, and it passes by a local highway.

== History ==
The remains of two Paleolithic settlements have been discovered near the village, which was established in 1700.

During the Holodomor, the village was blacklisted by the government of the Ukrainian Soviet Socialist Republic, which blockaded Kateryniv, causing mass starvation.

Out of the 270 residents that fought in World War II, 187 died on the Eastern Front. 143 of them received posthumous honours and a monument to the fallen was erected in 1968.

On 29 October 2024, during the Russian invasion of Ukraine, Russia claimed to have captured the village. This was confirmed on 3 November.

In August 2026, the ISW said that Ukraine had likely regained control of Katerynivka.

== Economy ==
The village has a primarily agricultural economy, centred on the cultivation of grain and the rearing of cattle. Its central estate is a collective farm named after. I. V. Michurin, which holds two cattle farms and two grain farms, spread over 3850 hectares of agricultural land.

The village also has a primary school, a post office and a shopping center.

== Demographics ==
According to the 2001 census, the population of the village was 778 people, of whom 90.1% stated that their mother tongue was Ukrainian, 9.38% - Russian, and 0.26% - Belarusian.

== Famous people ==
- Foma Kozhyn (d. 1921) - commander of the machine-gun regiment in the Revolutionary Insurgent Army of Ukraine
- Yakov Maskalevsky (d. 1922) - insurgent commander during the Ukrainian War of Independence
- Vasiliy Zhuravlyov (1913-2001) - officer in the Soviet Army during World War II
