= Marinka urban hromada =

Marinka urban hromada Мар'їнська міська громада
- Hromada
- Interactive map of Marinka urban hromada
- Country: Ukraine
- Oblast: Donetsk
- Raion: Pokrovsk

Area
  - Total: 485.3 km^{2} (187.4 sq mi)

Population (2020)
  - Total: 33,643
  - Density: 69.32/km^{2} (179.5/sq mi)
- Settlements: 17
- Cities: 2
- Villages: 15

Marinka urban hromada (Ukrainian: Мар'їнська міська громада) is a hromada of Ukraine, located in Pokrovsk Raion, Donetsk Oblast. Its administrative center is the city Marinka.

It has an area of 485.3 square kilometres (187.4 mi^{2}) and a population of 33,643, as of 2020.

The hromada contains 17 settlements: 2 cities (Marinka and Krasnohorivka) and 15 villages:

- Antonivka
- Bazhane Pershe
- Bazhane Druhe
- Heorhiivka
- Yelyzavetivka
- Zoriane
- Illinka
- Katerynivka
- Kostiantynivka
- Maksymilianivka
- Novomykhailivka
- Oleksandropil
- Paraskoviivka
- Peremoha
- Romanivka

== See also ==
- List of hromadas of Ukraine
