= Marinka, Ukraine =

Deserted city in Donetsk Oblast, Ukraine

Marinka Мар'їнка
- City
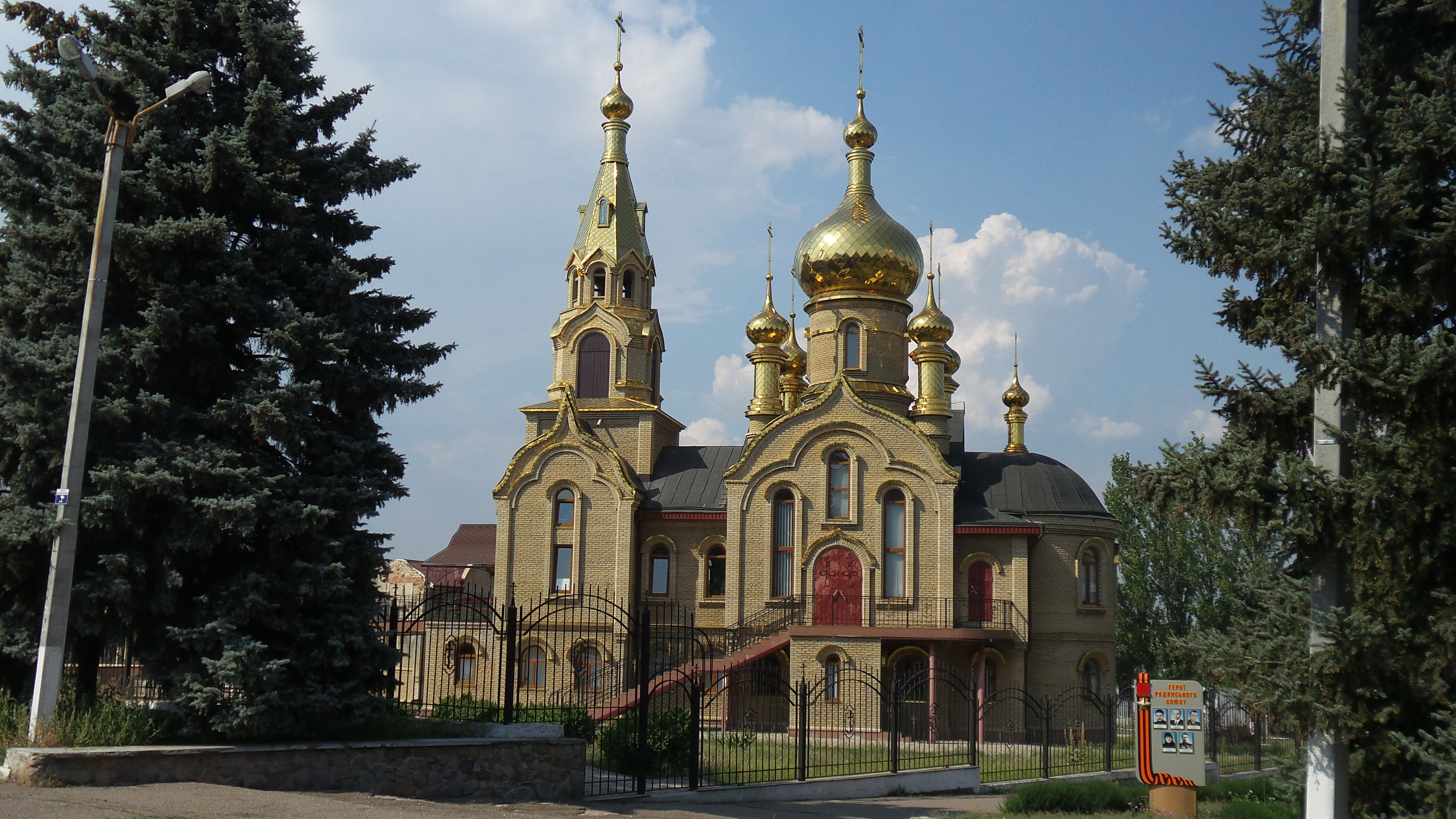
- Our Lady of Kazan Orthodox Cathedral in 2014
- Interactive map of Marinka
- Location within Donetsk Oblast Location within Ukraine
- Coordinates: 47°56′31″N 37°30′13″E
- Country: Ukraine
- Oblast: Donetsk Oblast
- Raion: Pokrovsk Raion
- Hromada: Marinka urban hromada
- Founded: 1840s

Population (2022)
  - Total: 9,089
  - Estimate (2023): 0

Marinka (Ukrainian: Мар'їнка, pronounced [ˈmɑrjinkɐ]; Russian: Марьинка, romanized: Maryinka) is a destroyed city in Pokrovsk Raion, Donetsk Oblast, eastern Ukraine. Its estimated population in 2022 was 9,089 with 2001 estimates pinning it at 10,530.

During the Russo-Ukrainian war, the city was largely destroyed as a result of fighting, with no civilians living in the city since November 2022. On 25 December 2023, the city was reported as fully captured by Russian forces.

== History ==
The area which is now Marinka was part of the Kalmius Palanka, an 18th-century administrative division of the Zaporizhian Sich. After the 1775 liquidation of the Zaporozhian Sich, the area that is today Marinka was included in the lands granted to Greek settlers who had emigrated from Crimea in 1778, but Marinka itself remained undeveloped by the 1830s.

Former Ukrainian Cossacks and state serfs from various counties of the Poltava and Kharkov governorates began moving in during the 1840s. Poles from the Kiev and Podolia governorates were also exiled to what is now Marinka after the partitions of Poland in the late 18th century. While the state serfs worked communal land, the exiled Poles were considered odnodvortsy (landowners). By 1859, Marinka had 1,318 residents. Administratively, Marinka belonged to Aleksandrovsk county in the Yekaterinoslav Governorate. The village administration consisted of a starshyna (village head), a tax collector, a secretary, and an overseer.

Marinka received urban-type settlement status in 1938. During World War II, Marinka was under German occupation between 1941 and 1943. Having been locked up in the police station, the Jews of the city (and the surrounding villages) were killed in a mass execution by an Einsatzgruppe. The site of the massacre is located in a pit near the cemetery.

=== Russo-Ukrainian War ===
==== War in Donbas ====
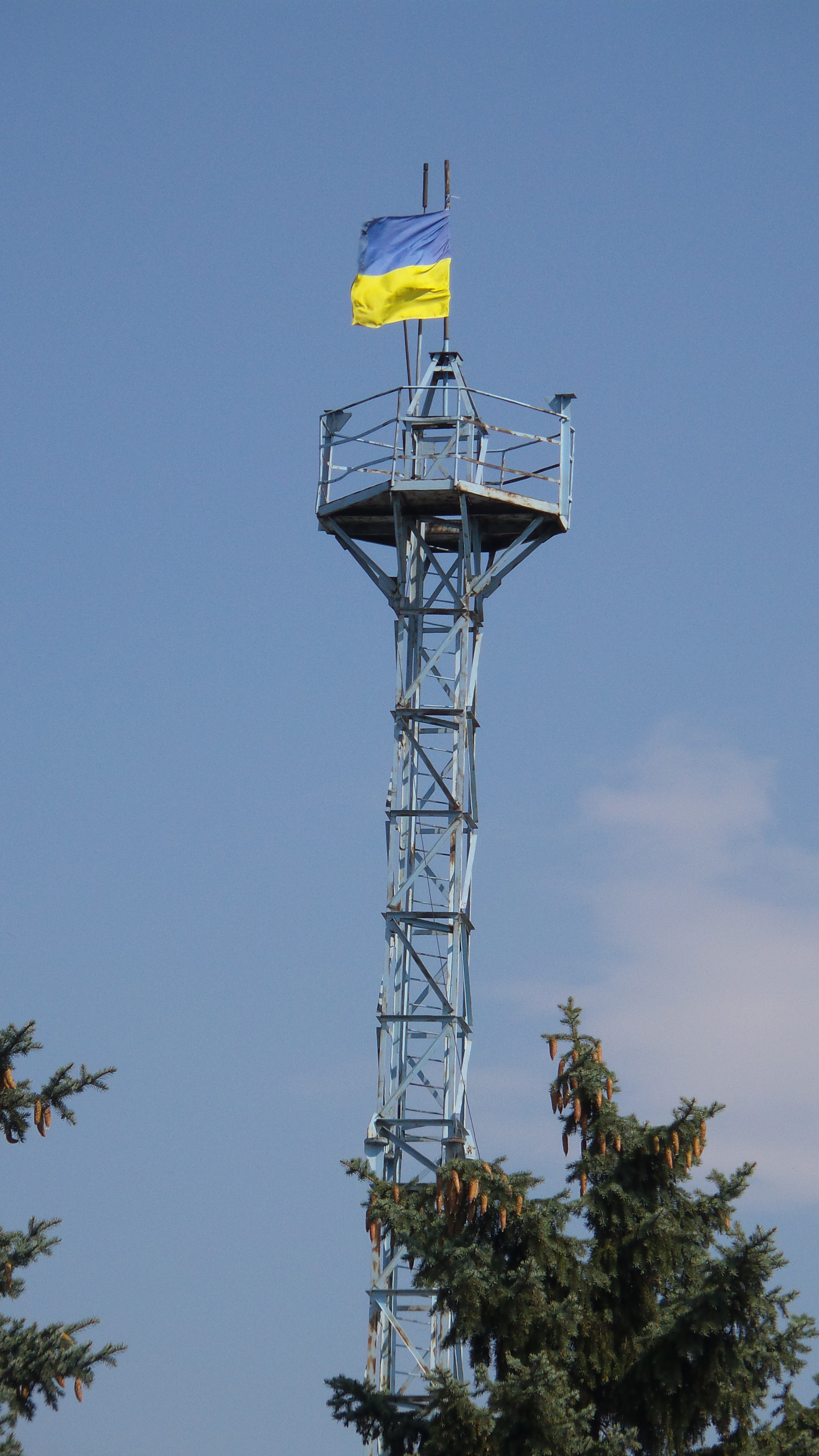
August 2014: Ukrainian flag over the radio tower in Marinka.

Starting in mid-April 2014 Russian-backed paramilitaries captured several towns in Donetsk Oblast, including Marinka. On 5 August 2014, Ukrainian forces regained control of Marinka. Ukrainian forces involved in the recapture included the Azov Battalion, whose flag flew in the city in early August. A member of the group with Russian citizenship was killed in action during the battle for the city. Fourteen other Azov members were wounded, nine of whom by the explosion of their tank due to an anti-tank mine.

On 3 June 2015, violence returned to the area as pro-Russian combatants launched an offensive on the city involving 1,000 fighters, tanks and heavy artillery. They stated they were engaging in defensive measures in response to a Ukrainian army assault. By then, the city had already been devastated by months of heavy fighting.

According to the BBC, the fighting was the heaviest of the war in Donbas since the Minsk II ceasefire was signed on 11 February 2015. By the early evening of 3 June, Donetsk People's Republic's Defence Minister Vladimir Kononov and the Ukrainian military confirmed to the OSCE that Marinka was under Ukrainian control. According to OSCE figures, 28 people, including 9 civilians, were killed in Marinka on 3 June 2015.

The city was shelled on a regular basis, with Ukrainian troops returning fire. Pro-Russian fighters accused Ukrainian troops of using their positions in Marinka to shell militant-controlled Donetsk, a claim denied by the Ukrainian military.

Three people died close to a checkpoint on 10 February 2016 when a minibus while bypassing a queue drove roadside and hit a land mine. The driver had ignored land mine warning signs. According to Ukrainian MP Iryna Herashchenko, 5,000 people lived in Marinka in September 2016.

==== Russian invasion of Ukraine ====
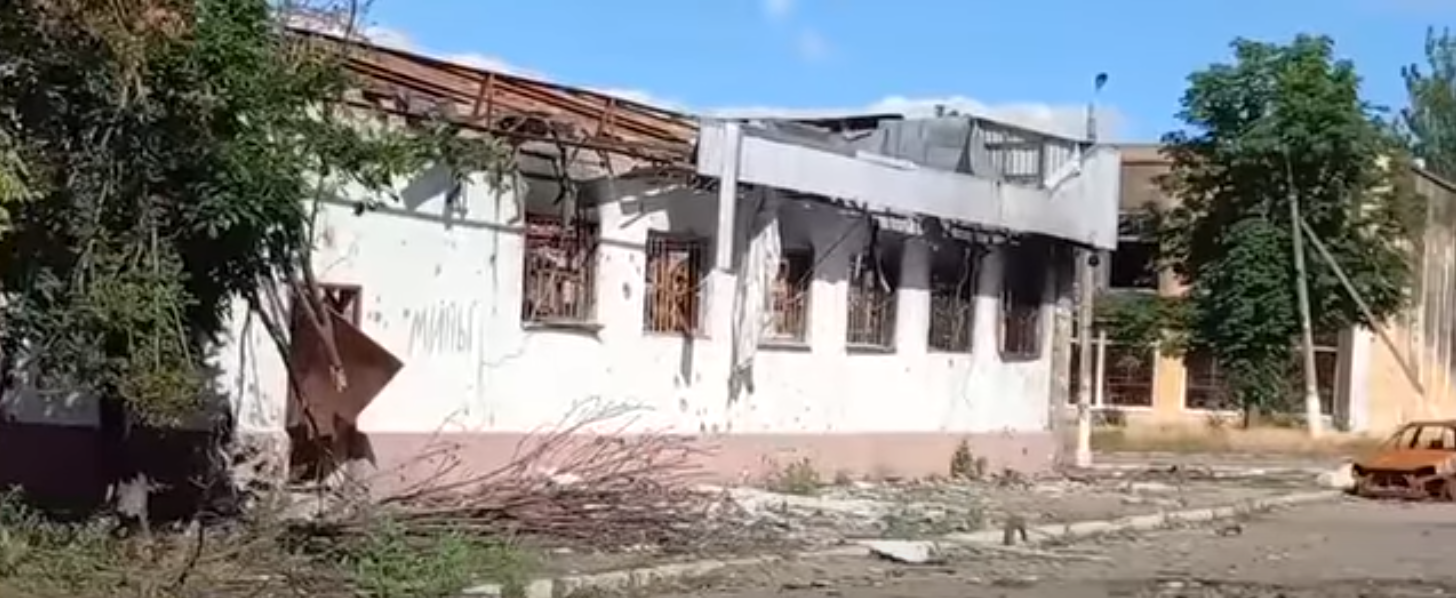
A destroyed building in Marinka, June 2022.

Battles for Marinka resumed in 2022 following the full-scale Russian invasion of Ukraine. In the process, much of the city was destroyed, with only a few residents remaining as of May 2022, according to Der Spiegel. One reporter likened Marinka in January 2023 to an "urban hellscape." During the battle, buildings were purposefully destroyed in order to prevent them from being used as cover. By March 2023, all civilians had been evacuated from Marinka, leaving the city completely uninhabited.

On 25 December 2023, Russian forces announced to have taken control of the city, which was initially denied by Ukraine. The following day on 26 December 2023, the Commander-in-Chief of the Armed Forces of Ukraine, Valery Zaluzhny, said that Ukrainian forces had withdrawn from Marinka and entrenched themselves on its outskirts and further away. He described that Marinka "no longer exists" after being destroyed "street by street" by the Russian forces. The BBC reported that the city was captured by Russian forces.

== Demographics ==
Population history
Year	Pop.	±% p.a.
1859	1,318	—
2001	10,530	+1.47%
2016	5,000	−4.84%
2022	9,089	+10.47%
2023	0	−100.00%

According to the 2001 Ukrainian census, Marinka had a population of 10,530 people. The ethnic composition was:

Ethnic groups in Marinka
Ethnic groups	percent
Ukrainians	81.23%
Russians	15.80%
Greeks	0.59%
Armenians	0.58%
Belarusians	0.51%
Azerbaijanis	0.14%
Georgians	0.10%
Tatars	0.10%

The native language composition was:

Native languages in Marinka
Languages	percent
Ukrainian	70.1%
Russian	28.9%
Armenian	0.4%
Greek	0.1%
Belarusian	0.1%
others	0.4%

== Gallery ==
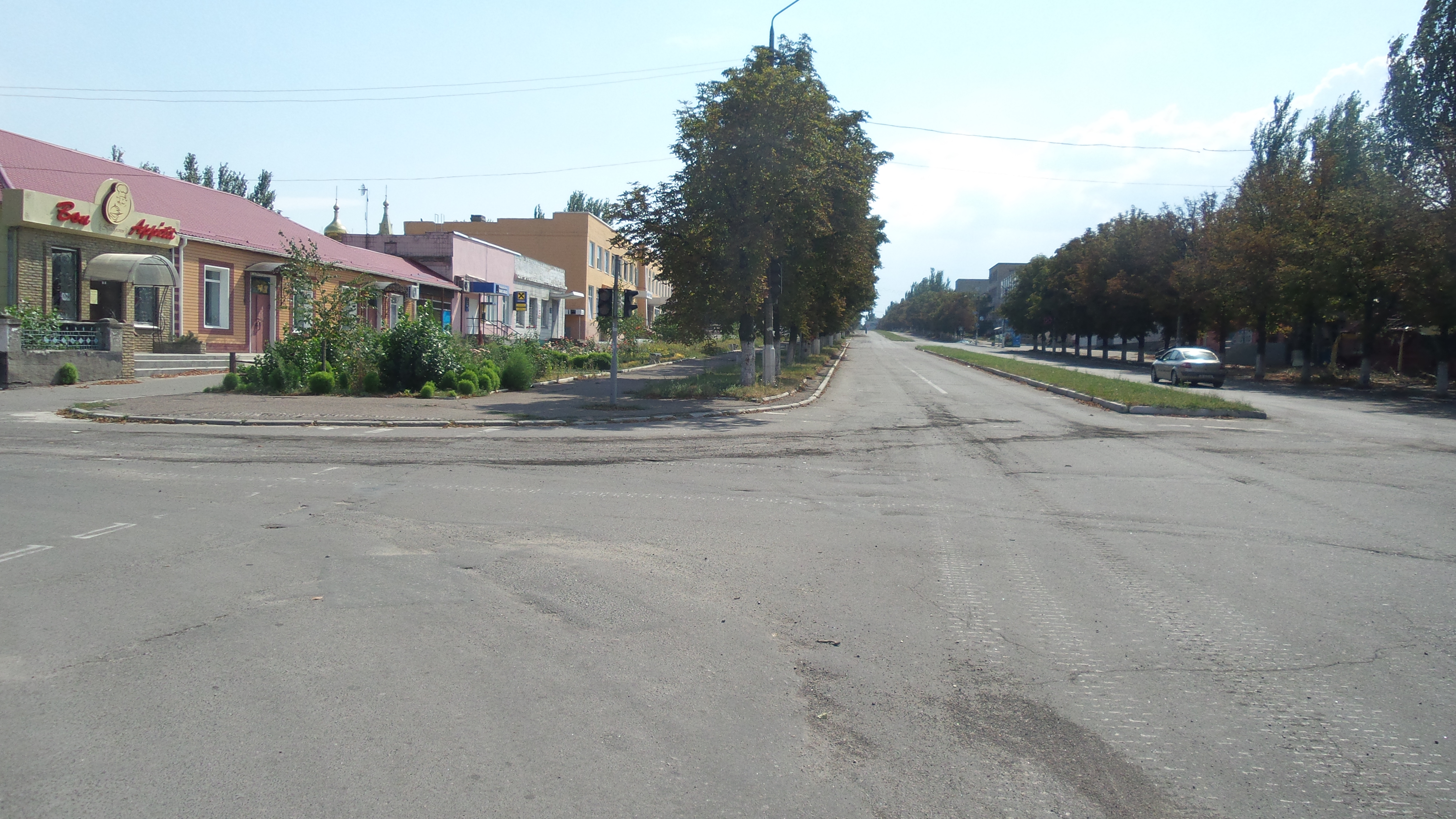
Central part of Marinka.

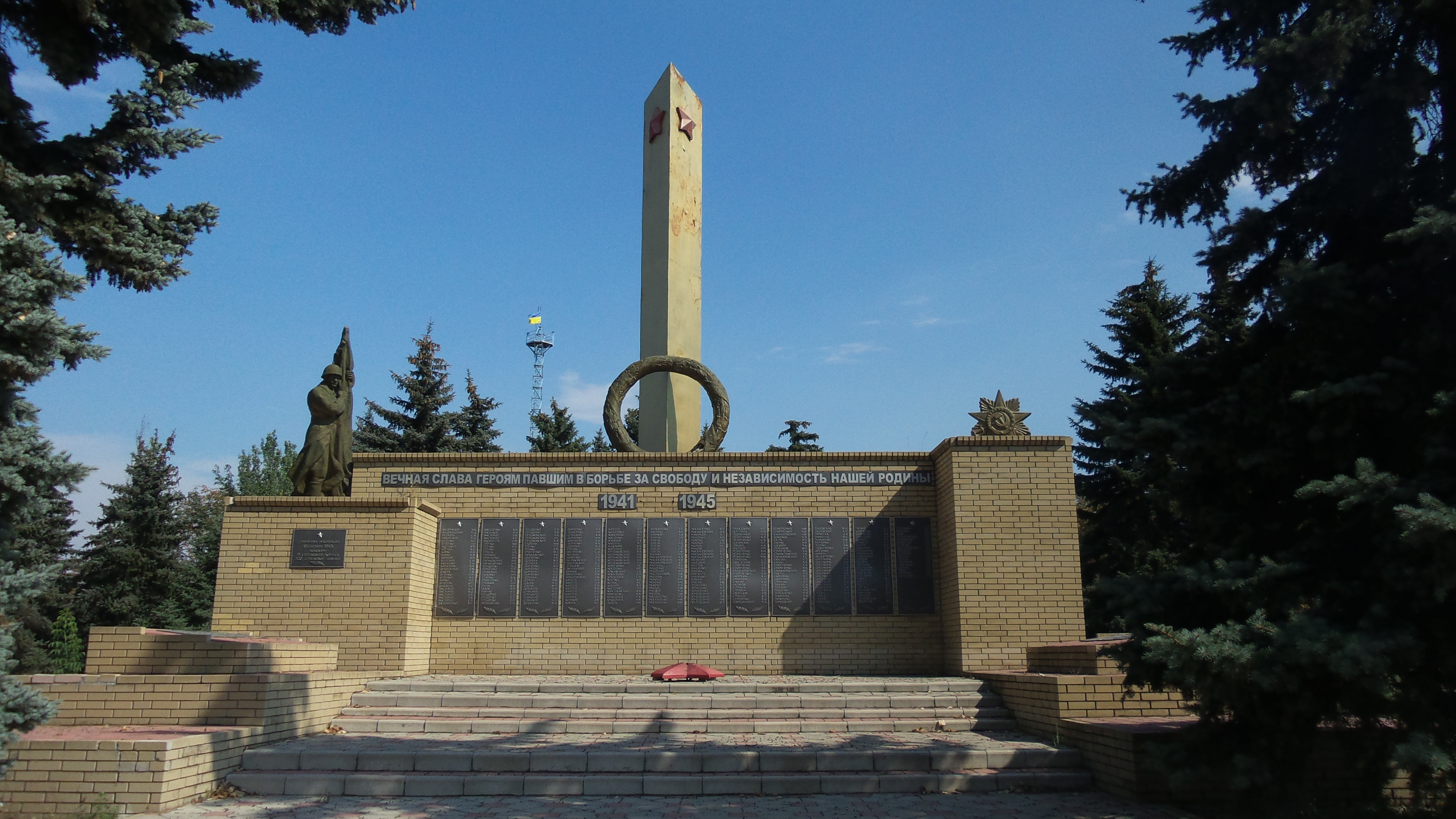
World War II memorial.

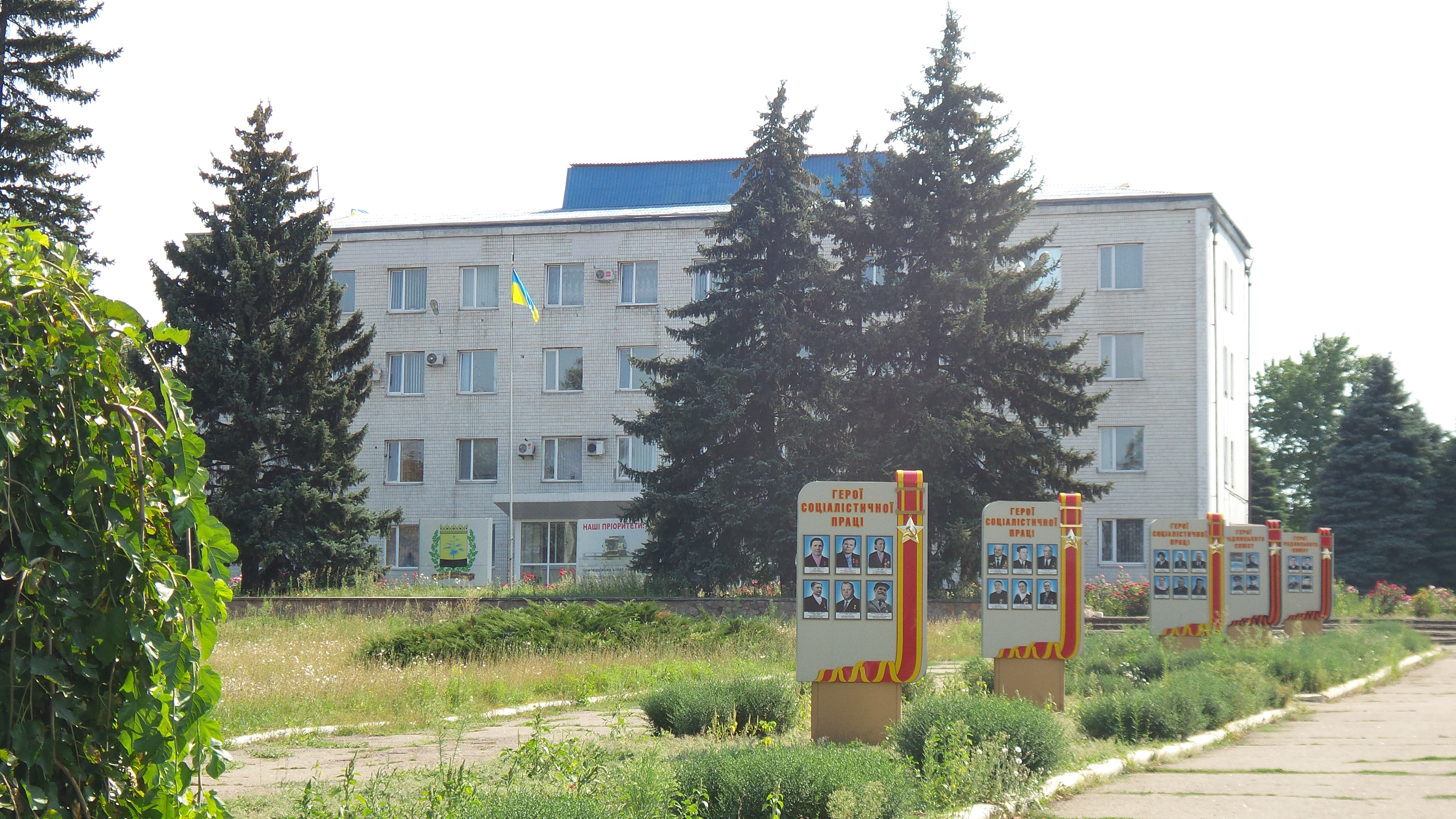
Administrative building.

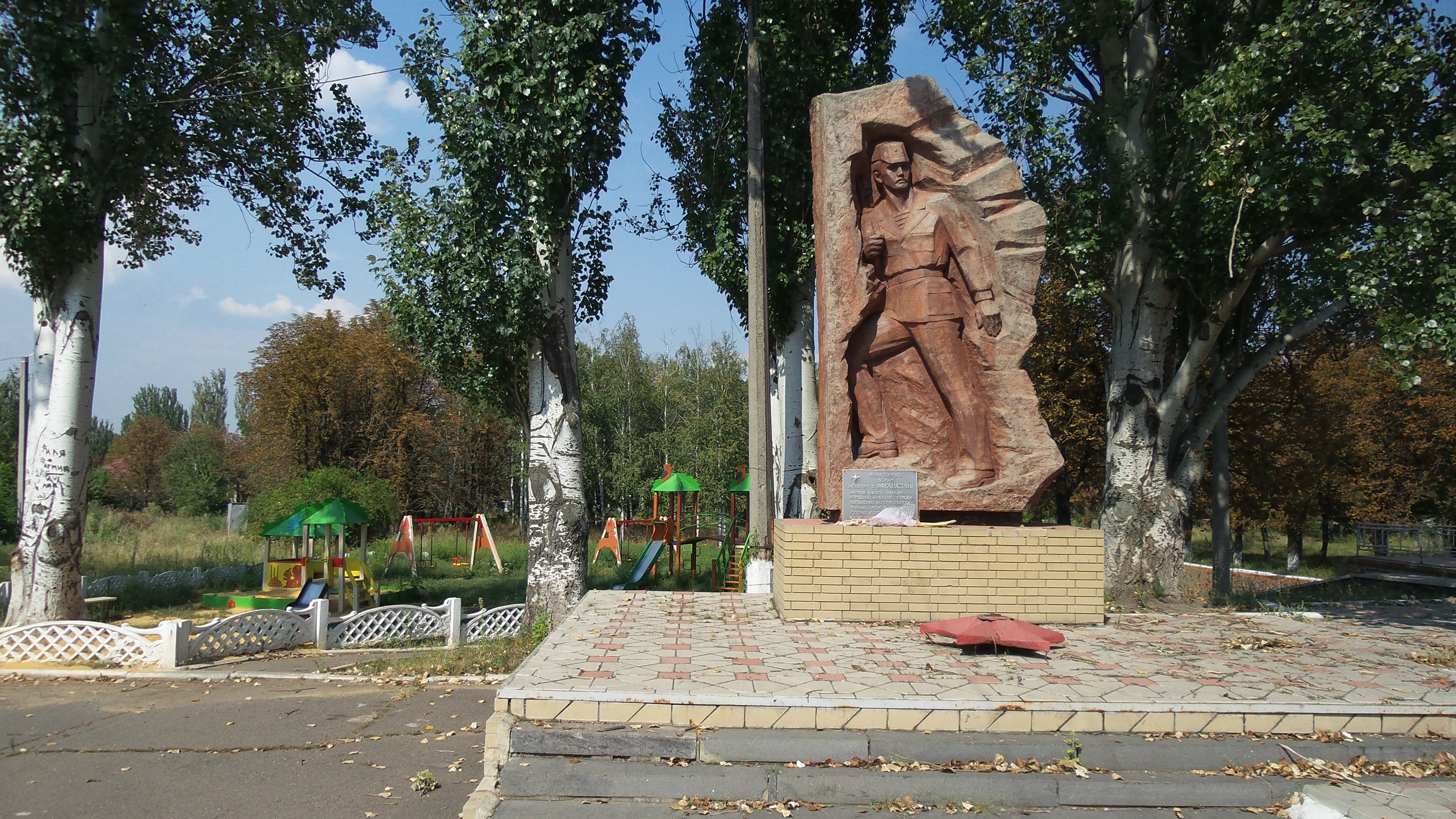
Afghan War memorial in city park.

== Notable people ==
- Oleksandr Klymenko (born 1965), Ukrainian politician and entrepreneur.
