= Peremoha, Pokrovsk Raion, Donetsk Oblast =

Village in Donetsk Oblast, Ukraine

Peremoha Перемога
- Village
- Interactive map of Peremoha
- Location of Peremoha within Ukraine Peremoha (Ukraine)
- Coordinates: 47.914722°N 37.461111°E
- Country: Ukraine
- Oblast: Donetsk Oblast
- Raion: Pokrovsk Raion
- Hromada: Marinka urban hromada
- Elevation: 178 m (584 ft)

Population (2001 census)
  - Total: 726
- Time zone: UTC+2 (EET)
  - Summer (DST): UTC+3 (EEST)
- Postal code: 85600
- Area code: +380 6278
- KATOTTH code: UA14160130160088848

Peremoha (Ukrainian: Перемога), formerly Pobieda (Ukrainian: Побєда; Russian: Победа), is a village (selo) in Pokrovsk Raion (district) in Donetsk Oblast of eastern Ukraine, at about 28.13 kilometres (17.48 mi) west-southwest (WSW) of the center of Donetsk city. It belongs to Marinka urban hromada, one of the hromadas of Ukraine.

== History ==
On 22 February 2024, the Russian military captured the village during the Russian invasion of Ukraine.

On 18 June 2025, the Verkhovna Rada renamed the village to Peremoha to match Ukrainian language standards.

== Demographics ==
As of 2023, 121 people lived in the village.
