= Maryevka =

Maryevka Марьевка
- Village
- Location within Bashkortostan Location within Russia
- Coordinates: 52°53′N 55°19′E
- Country: Russia
- Region: Bashkortostan
- District: Kuyurgazinsky District
- Time zone: UTC+5:00

Maryevka (Russian: Марьевка) is a rural locality (a village) in Zyak-Ishmetovsky Selsoviet, Kuyurgazinsky District, Bashkortostan, Russia. The population was 245 as of 2010. There are 3 streets.

== Geography ==
Maryevka is located 53 km northwest of Yermolayevo, (the district's administrative centre) by road. Zyak-Ishmetovo is the nearest rural locality.
