= Paraskoviivka, Pokrovsk Raion, Donetsk Oblast =

Village in Donetsk Oblast, Ukraine

Paraskoviivka Парасковіївка
- Village
- Interactive map of Paraskoviivka
- Location of Paraskoviivka within Ukraine Paraskoviivka (Ukraine)
- Coordinates: 47.868333°N 37.446944°E
- Country: Ukraine
- Oblast Region: Donetsk Oblast
- Raion: Pokrovsk Raion
- Hromada: Marinka urban hromada
- Elevation: 152 m (499 ft)

Population (2001 census)
  - Total: 2,802
  - Estimate (2022): 52
- Time zone: UTC+2 (EET)
  - Summer (DST): UTC+3 (EEST)
- Postal code: 85654
- Area code: +380 6278

Paraskoviivka (Ukrainian: Парасковіївка; Russian: Парасковиевка) is a village (selo) in Pokrovsk Raion (district) in Donetsk Oblast of eastern Ukraine, located 31.37 kilometres (19.49 mi) southwest (SW) of the centre of Donetsk city. It belongs to Marinka urban hromada, one of the hromadas of Ukraine.

== History ==
The village was taken under control by Russian forces in the beginning of June 2024.

== Demographics ==
As of the 2001 Ukrainian census, the settlement had 1,192 inhabitants, whose native languages were 77.16% Ukrainian, 22.16% Russian, 0.29% Belarusian, 0.21% Armenian, 0.07% Moldovan (Romanian) and 0.04% Greek.
