= Kostiantynivka, Pokrovsk Raion, Donetsk Oblast =

Kostiantynivka Костянтинівка
- Village
- Interactive map of Kostiantynivka
- Kostiantynivka shown within Ukraine Kostiantynivka shown within Donetsk
- Coordinates: 47°52′10″N 37°24′20″E
- Country: Ukraine
- Oblast: Donetsk Oblast
- Raion: Pokrovsk Raion
- Hromada: Marinka urban hromada
- Founded: 1838
- Elevation: 135 m (443 ft)

Population (2001 census)
  - Total: 1,289
- Postal code: 85653
- Area code: +380 6278

Kostiantynivka is a village in Marinka urban hromada, Pokrovsk Raion, Donetsk Oblast, Ukraine. The population was 1,293 in the 2001 Ukrainian census.

== History ==
The village was founded in 1838.

=== Russo-Ukrainian War ===
As part of the Russian invasion of Ukraine, the village is currently part of the frontline and came under pressure in early June 2024.

On 24 July, a major mechanized assault was launched by Russian forces towards Kostiantynivka, taking significant losses, but advancing into the eastern outskirts of the village. In the following weeks, Russian forces made further advances in the village, reaching the center by 16 August. On 27 August, the village was likely fully captured by Russia.

== Demographics ==
According to the 2001 Ukrainian census, the population of the village was 1,289, of which 93.89% stated Ukrainian to be their native language, 5.96% stated their native language to be Russian and 0.08% Belarusian and Moldovan (Romanian).
