= Illinka, Marinka urban hromada, Pokrovsk Raion, Donetsk Oblast =

Village in Donetsk Oblast, Ukraine

Illinka Іллінка
- Village
- Interactive map of Illinka
- Location of Illinka Illinka (Ukraine)
- Coordinates: 47°53′28″N 37°19′00″E
- Country: Ukraine
- Oblast: Donetsk Oblast
- Raion: Pokrovsk Raion
- Hromada: Marinka urban hromada
- Elevation: 127 m (417 ft)

Population (2001)
  - Total: 476
- Time zone: UTC+2
  - Summer (DST): UTC+3
- Postal code: 85651
- Area code: +380 6278

Illinka (Ukrainian: Іллінка) is a village in the Pokrovsk Raion, Donetsk Oblast (province) of eastern Ukraine.

== Demographics ==
Native language as of the Ukrainian Census of 2001:

- Ukrainian 98.32%
- Russian 1.68%
