= Novomykhailivka, Donetsk Oblast =

Novomykhailivka Новомихайлівка
- Village
- Interactive map of Novomykhailivka
- Location of Novomykhailivka within Ukraine Novomykhailivka (Ukraine)
- Coordinates: 47°51′12″N 37°28′59″E
- Country: Ukraine
- Oblast: Donetsk
- Raion: Pokrovsk
- Hromada: Marinka urban hromada

Area
  - Total: 0.86 km^{2} (0.33 sq mi)
  - Land: 0.86 km^{2} (0.33 sq mi)
- Elevation: 153 m (502 ft)

Population (2001 census)
  - Total: 1,415
  - Estimate (2024): 2
- Time zone: UTC+2 (EET)
  - Summer (DST): UTC+3 (EEST)
- Postal code: 85654
- Area code: +380 6278
- KATOTTH: UA14160130130080935

Novomykhailivka (Ukrainian: Новомихайлівка [ˌnowomɪˈxɑjl⁽ʲ⁾iu̯kɐ]; Russian: Новомихайловка) is a village in Pokrovsk Raion in Donetsk Oblast of eastern Ukraine, 39.8 km southwest of the centre of Donetsk city. The village was home to the Miracle of Archangel Michael Church (Ukrainian: Храм Дива Архангела Михаїла, romanized: Khram Dyva Arkhangela Mykhaila) of the Orthodox Church of Ukraine. The church, built in 1907 using donations, was closed and turned into storage by the Soviet authorities in 1932, although restoration works began in the late 1980s.

Russian troops fighting in the village, February 2024

With Novomykhailivka being close to the front line of the War in Donbas, there has been fighting in and around the village during the 2022 Russian invasion of Ukraine. The village was completely destroyed as a result of fighting by January 2024. On 28 April 2024, the village was captured by Russia.

== History ==
The village was founded in 1837.

=== Russo-Ukrainian War ===
==== War in Donbas ====
During the War in Donbas, on 29 October 2014, the checkpoint near the village of Novomykhailivka (Maryinka district) was shelled by pro-Russian armed formations, a mine hit a tree and scattered in fragments, hit a trench, a soldier of the 28th brigade Konstantin Sergienko was mortally wounded, while saving his comrade, whom he protected from shrapnel. On 18 December 2014, near the village of Novomykhailivka, at night, a column of soldiers of the 28th Brigade was ambushed and fired upon, a soldier Oleksandr Gruzovenko was killed.

On 3 June 2015, at about 4 a.m., Russian-terrorist armed groups attempted to storm Maryinka, the attack began with a massive shelling of the positions of the Armed Forces of Ukraine with the use of self-propelled guns, artillery and MLRS. After artillery preparation, 2 tactical infantry groups with the support of tanks went on the assault. The Armed Forces of Ukraine used artillery, the offensive was repulsed, the terrorists suffered losses and retreated. 3 soldiers of the 28th Brigade were killed in the battle — a senior soldier Oleksandr Haluschinskyi, a junior sergeant Vasyl Pysarenko and a senior sergeant Vasyl Pykhteev; 26 soldiers were wounded.

On 8 May 2019, a local church that previously belonged to the Russian Orthodox Church (UOC-MP), transfer to OCU.

On 6 February 2021, explosion of an unknown device killed Polishchuk Nazarii Ivanovych and Podvezennyi Oleksii Gennadiyovych.

Ukrainian soldier Vladyslav Pavlovych Lyashenko was killed by Russian shelling of the Vop area on 11 February 2021, a violation of the Minsk agreements.

==== Russian invasion of Ukraine ====
===== Battle of Novomykhailivka (2023–2024) =====
During the Russian invasion of Ukraine, the battle for the village began in late autumn 2023. The Russians had concentrated between seven and 10 brigades and regiments with up to 30,000 soldiers in this direction, including the 155th Naval Infantry Brigade, against a Ukrainian garrison of two active brigades. As of April 2024, the Russians had lost more than 300 military vehicles in the Novomykhailivka area, implying troop losses of around 13,000 killed and wounded. This included dozens of tanks, from vintage T-54 and T-62 tanks to newer T-72 and T-80 models. According to Forbes, "At the cost of 320 vehicles and potentially thousands of troops over six months, the Russian military advanced four miles into and through Novomykhailivka". Meanwhile, the Ukrainian 79th Air Assault Brigade showed a map with the location of neutralized equipment and claimed that it had become "one of the largest cemeteries of Russian equipment".

== Demographics ==
As of the 2001 Ukrainian census, the settlement had 1,415 inhabitants, whose native languages were as follows:

Language	Percentage
Ukrainian	92.21%
Russian	6.74%
Belarusian	0.14%
Hungarian	0.07%

== See also ==
- List of villages in Donetsk Oblast
