= Vovcha =

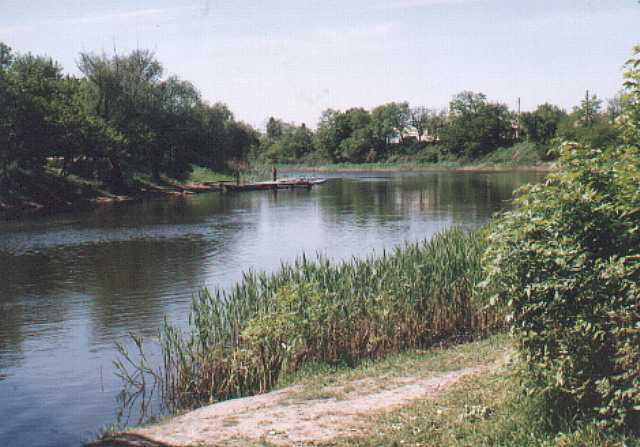

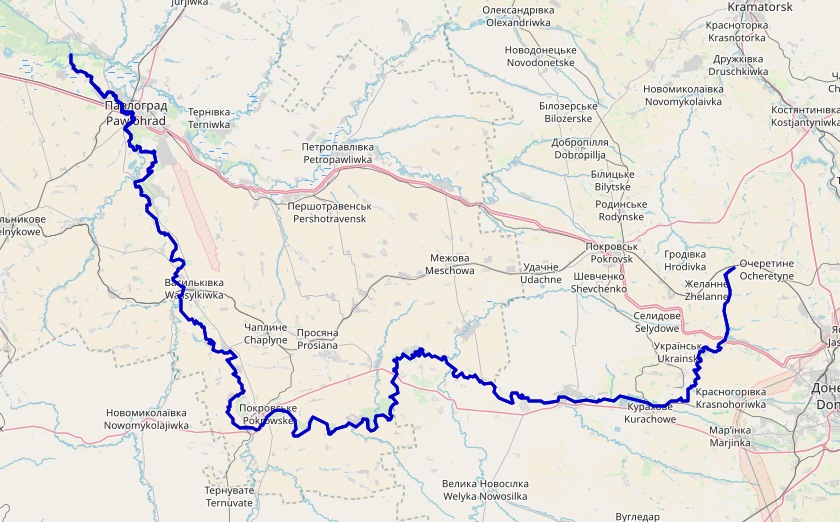

Location
- Country: Ukraine

Physical characteristics
- Mouth: Samara
  - coordinates: 48°38′12″N 35°41′29″E
- Length: 323 km (201 mi)
- Basin size: 13,300 km^{2} (5,100 sq mi)

Basin features
- Progression: Samara→ Dnieper→ Dnieper–Bug estuary→ Black Sea

The Vovcha (Ukrainian: Вовча) is a river in Dnipropetrovsk and Donetsk oblasts, Ukraine. The river flows for 323 kilometres, covering a basin area of 13,300 km^{2}. It runs through the city of Pavlohrad. It flows into the Samara near the village of Raduta.
