= Donetsk Symphony Orchestra =

Ukrainian orchestra

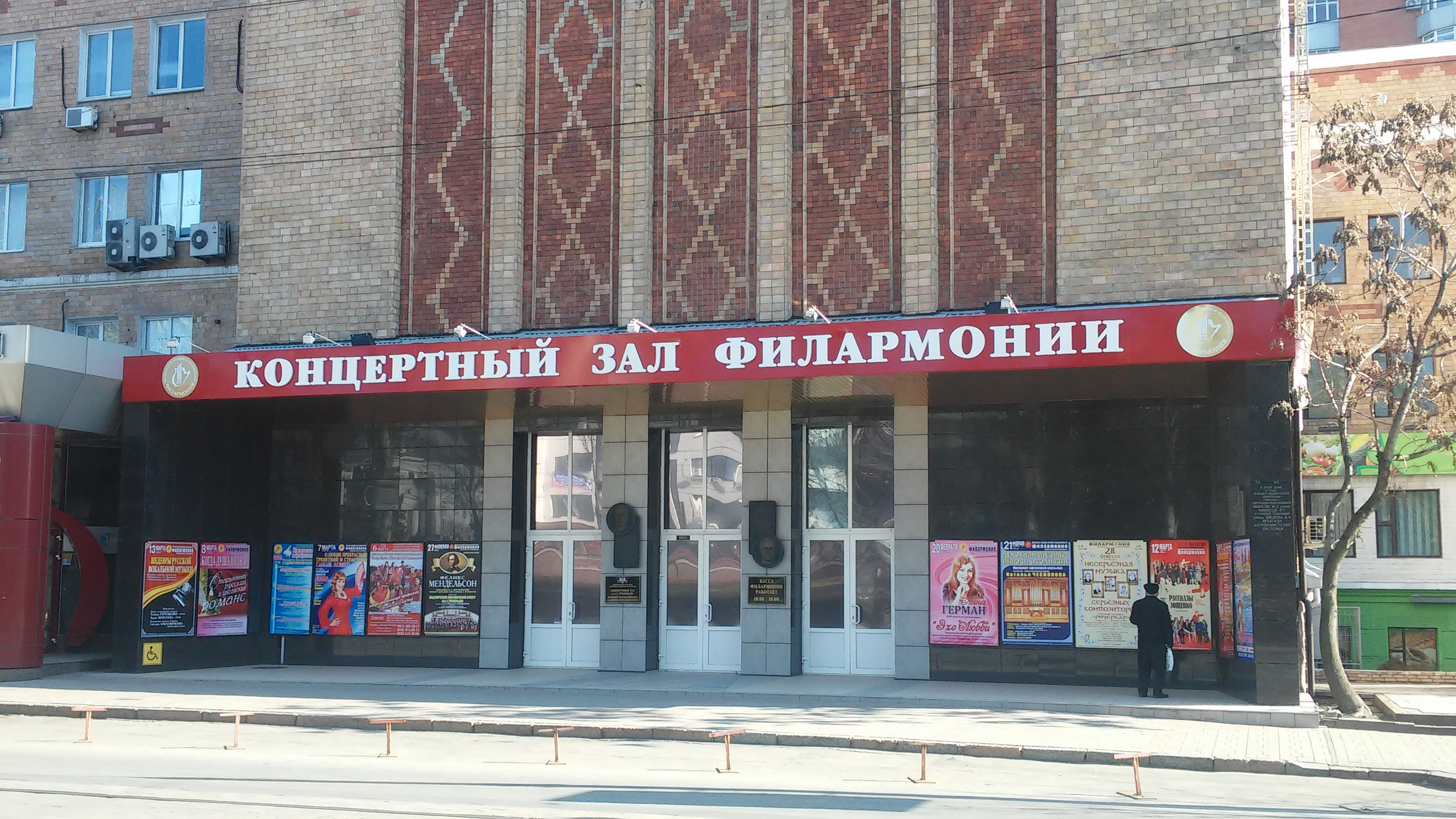
The headquarters of the orchestra.

The Symphony Orchestra of Donetsk Philharmonic Society is an orchestra based on Lenin Square in Donetsk, Ukraine.

Notable members include:

- Roman Krasnovsky
- Goran Bregović

== See also ==
- Soledar Salt Mine
