= 77th Airmobile Brigade =

Ukrainian Air Assault Forces unit

- 77-ма окрема аеромобільна бригада
- Shoulder Sleeve Insignia
- Active: Summer 2022 – Present
- Country: Ukraine
- Branch: Ukrainian Air Assault Forces
- Role: Air Assault
- Part of: 7th Rapid Response Corps
- Engagements: Russian invasion of Ukraine: Battle of Soledar; Battle of Bakhmut; Kupiansk offensive
- Website: https://www.facebook.com/77oaembr

Insignia
- Flag

Brigade soldiers crossing a body of water on a UGV

The 77th Airmobile Brigade "Naddnipryanska" (Ukrainian: 77-ма окрема аеромобільна бригада; 77 ОАеМБр; MUN A4355) is a brigade of the Ukrainian Air Assault Forces formed in the summer of 2022.

== History ==
The brigade was formed in the summer of 2022 as part of the expansion of the Ukrainian Air Assault Forces. Its first units finished basic training in October 2022.

=== Battle of Soledar ===
The unit received decorations and praise from Ukrainian president Volodymyr Zelenskyy along with the 46th Airmobile Brigade for its defense of Soledar.

=== Battle of Bakhmut ===
Following the capture of Soledar by Russian forced on January 16, 2023 the unit has joined in the defense of Bakhmut. On March 5, 2023, the unit uploaded a video to their telegram showing the remains of an entirely destroyed Russian unit which was outfitted in elements of uniforms taken from captured or killed Ukrainian troops. On March 29, 2023, the brigade saw more praise from President Zelenskyy for their defense of Bakhmut alongside the 57th Motorized Brigade and the 93rd Mechanized Brigade.

=== Kupiansk-Borova front, Kharkiv Oblast ===
In July 2024, it was reported that the brigade's 4th Battalion was taking part in combat operations on the Borova front of the war. Units of the brigade remained in the Kharkiv Oblast on the Borova front throughout August 2024. On 23 August 2024, the brigade was awarded the honorary name "Naddnipryanska" by decree of President Volodymyr Zelenskyy.

=== Operations in Kharkiv Oblast (2024–present) ===
In June 2024, it was reported that the brigade was positioned in the Kharkiv Oblast, and the next month it was reported that it was operating on the Kupiansk front. In October 2024, it was reported that the brigade was positioned on the Kupiansk front, amid Russian attempts to force the Oskil River. In November, it was reported that the units of the brigade were operating near the village of Kruhliakivka, where it was opposed by the 1st Guards Tank Regiment of Russia's Tamanskaya Division. The brigade remained on the Kupiansk front, specifically near Kruhliakivka, during November and December.

In January 2025, it was reported that units of the brigade were operating near the village of Zahryzove, which is adjacent to Kruhliakivka. The same month it was reported that the brigade was responsible for holding the defense of part of the Oskil River. The brigade remained on the Kupiansk-Borova front in the Kharkiv Oblast throughout January and February.

In February 2025, it was reported that units of the 77th Brigade were operating the village of Lozova, which is adjacent to Zahryzove. The brigade continued to operate on the Kupiansk-Borova front during March, April, and May 2025, including on the Oskil River. As of May, the front line in the brigade's area of responsibility had remained mostly static for several months.

== Structure ==
As of 2024, the brigade's structure is as follows:

- 77th Airmobile Brigade
  - Headquarters & Headquarters Company
  - 1st Airmobile Battalion
  - 2nd Airmobile Battalion
  - 3rd Airmobile Battalion
  - 4th Airmobile Battalion
  - Artillery Group
    - Headquarters and Target Acquisition Battery
    - 1st Self-propelled Artillery Battalion (2S1 Gvozdika)
    - 2nd Self-propelled Artillery Battalion (122 mm howitzer 2A18 (D-30))
    - Rocket Artillery Unit
    - Anti-Tank Battery
  - Anti-Aircraft Defense Battalion
  - Tank Company
  - Sniper Company
  - Material Support Company
  - Airborne Support Company
  - Reconnaissance Company
  - Attack Drone Company "Rubaka"
  - Engineer Company
  - Maintenance Company
  - Logistic Company
  - Medical Company
  - Chemical, Biological, Radiological and Nuclear Defense Company
