= Soledar Salt Mine =

Salt mines in Soledar, Ukraine

Coordinates: 48°41′N 38°06′E

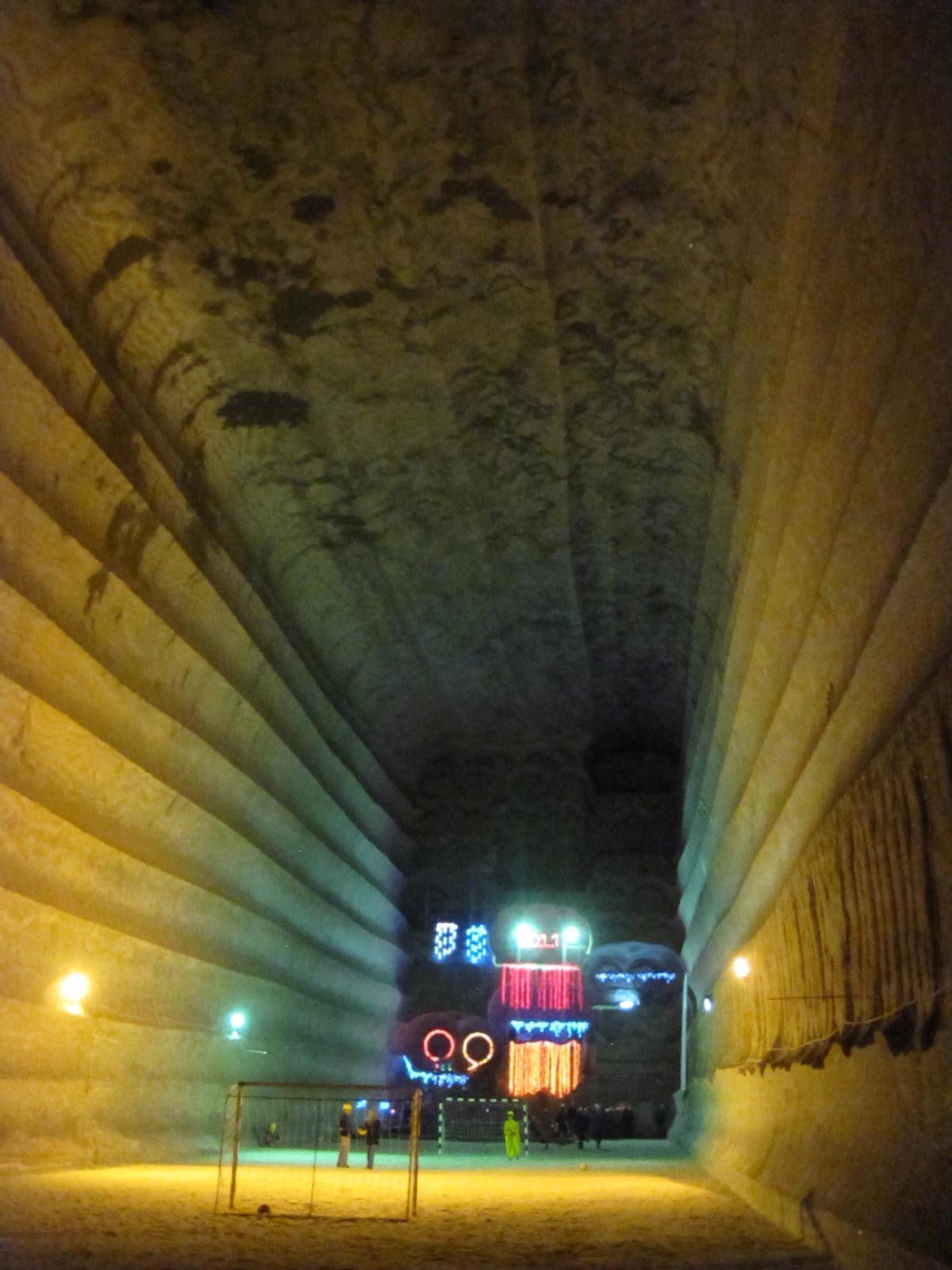
- Soledar Salt Mine concert hall
- Interactive map of Soledar Salt Mine
- Location: Soledar, Donetsk, Ukraine
- Products: Salt
- Type: Underground
- Greatest depth: 288 metres (945 ft)

The Soledar Salt Mine, also known as the Artemsil Salt Mine, is a major salt mining complex located in the city of Soledar, Donetsk Oblast, Ukraine. During the Russian invasion of Ukraine, the mine was damaged, and is currently defunct. Along with the rest of Soledar, the mines were captured by Russia in the battle of Soledar.

== Overview ==
The scale of the mines is vast, with 125 mi (201 km) of tunnels at a depth of 288 m (945 ft), and many of the chambers are 30 m (98 ft) in height. The largest resembles a hangar of about 100 m (330 ft) length and 40 m (130 ft) width and height, and has accommodated soccer matches and the inflation of a hot air balloon. There are accommodation areas in the chambers and even a church.

The temperature underground is constant at 14–15 °C, with 14.93 PSI air pressure and 60% humidity regardless of the time of the year, giving rise to claims of healing properties for lung conditions.

== History ==
The mining of salt started in the town of Soledar in the 19th century.

=== Russian invasion of Ukraine ===
During the Battle of Soledar, on 10 January 2023, pro-Russian outlets, including Wagner Group leader Yevgeny Prigozhin, claimed the mines were largely occupied by Russian and Wagner Forces, although these reports were not independently verified. After the claimed Russian capture of the whole city, Denis Pushilin, head of the Russian occupation administration of Donetsk Oblast, said during a visit to Soledar in late January 2023 that the salt mines remained damaged and difficult to descend into.

== Tourism ==
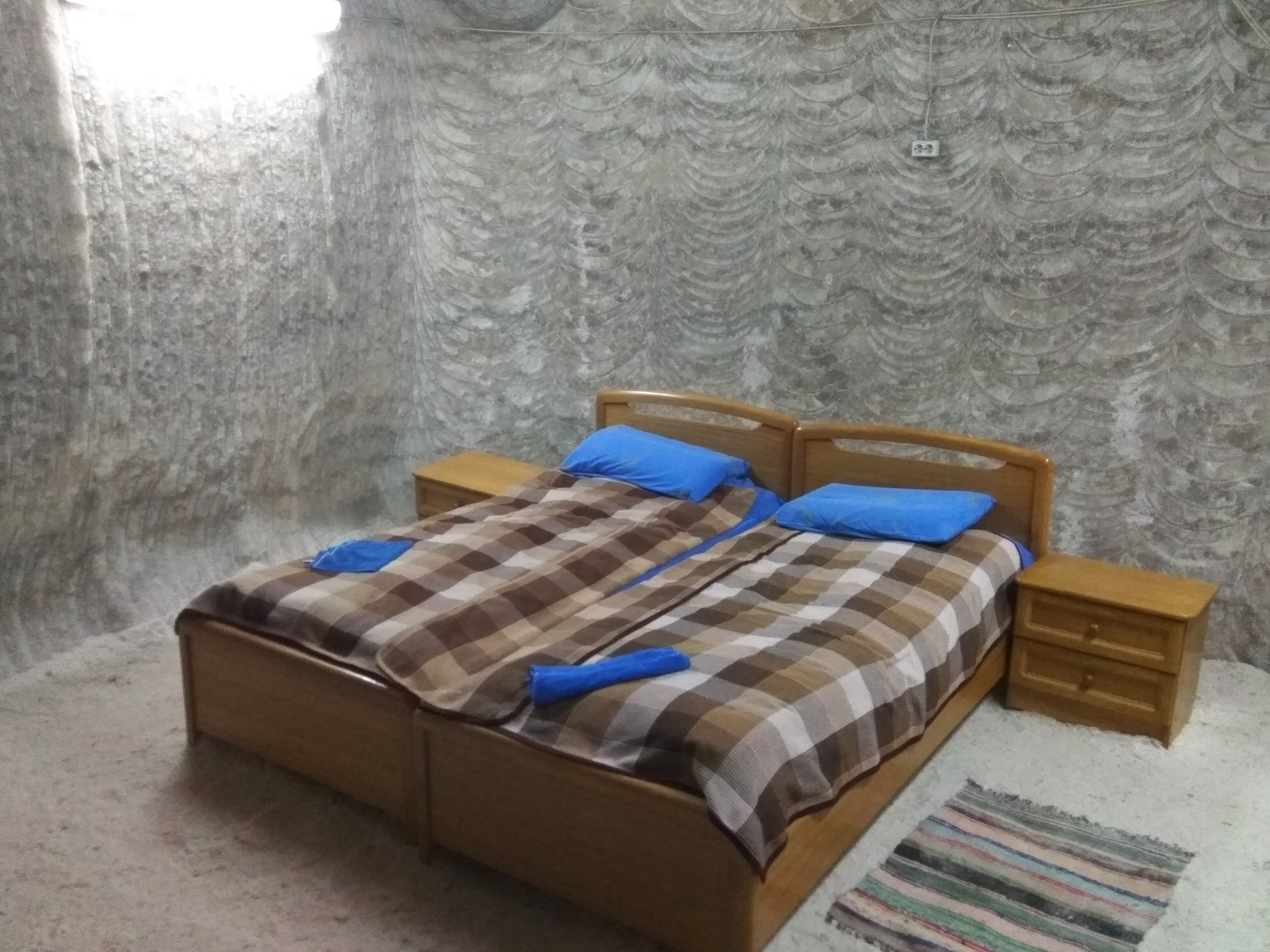
A "speleosanitorium"

Soledar's long history of mining has created an "underground city" of tunnels that Deutsche Welle described as a "magnet for tourists". There are guided tours as deep as 200–300 metres (660–980 ft), with attractions including sculptures made of salt crystals.

In 2004 and 2006, a cave was repurposed to host classical music concerts by the Donetsk Symphony Orchestra underground. In September 2020, the same chamber was also used for a soccer (football) match. It was also host to the first-ever underground hot air balloon flight, as listed in the Guinness Book of Records.

Since the early 1990s, the chambers have also contained "speleosanatoriums": rooms made of salt that attempt to "recreate the allegedly restorative conditions of salt mines", where 100 patients with respiratory diseases are treated. This practice is part of the controversial halotherapy industry, in which it is believed that the inhalation of salt dust is a "miracle cure for respiratory illnesses".

== Science ==
A particle physics detector, the Artyomovsk Scintillation Detector, is located in the mine.

== Gallery ==
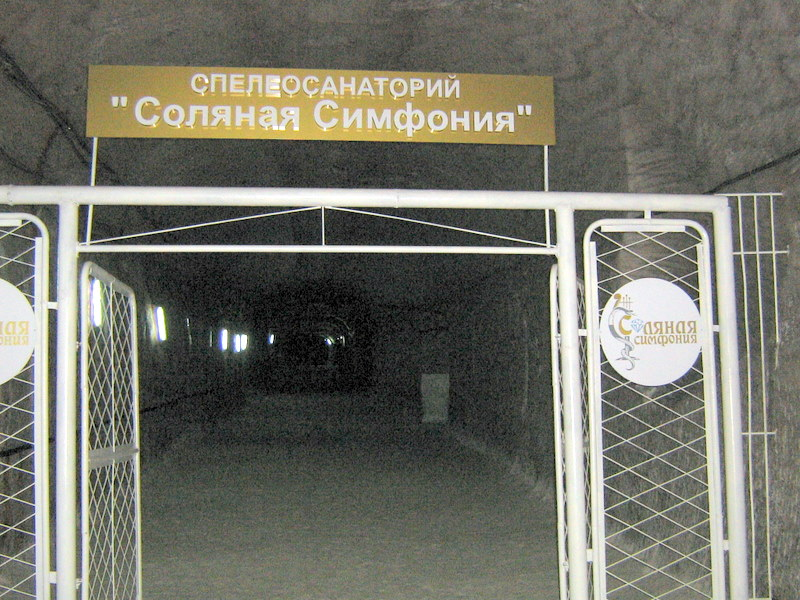
Entrance to Soledar salt mine

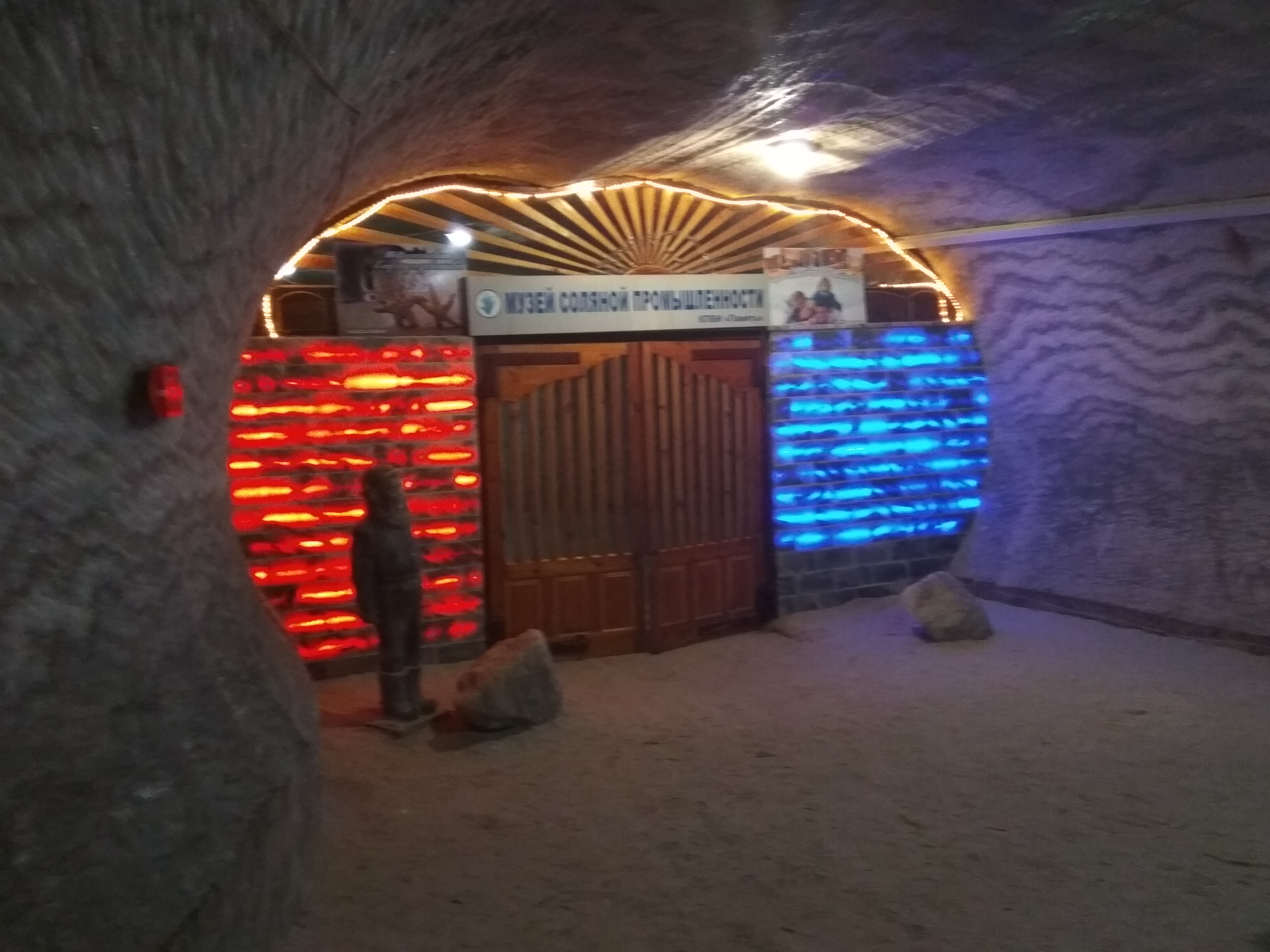
Soledar salt mine

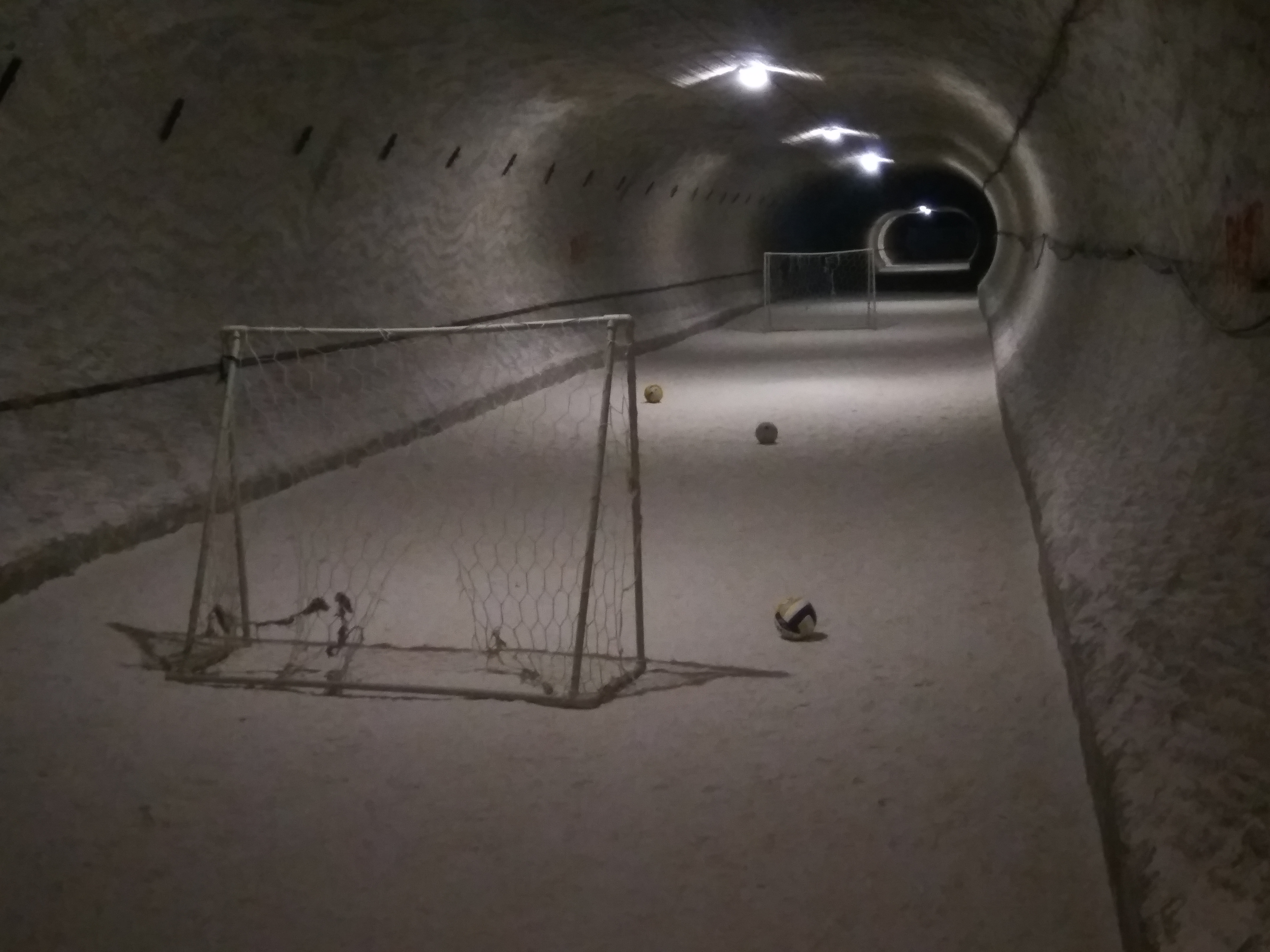
Football pitch in Soledar salt mine

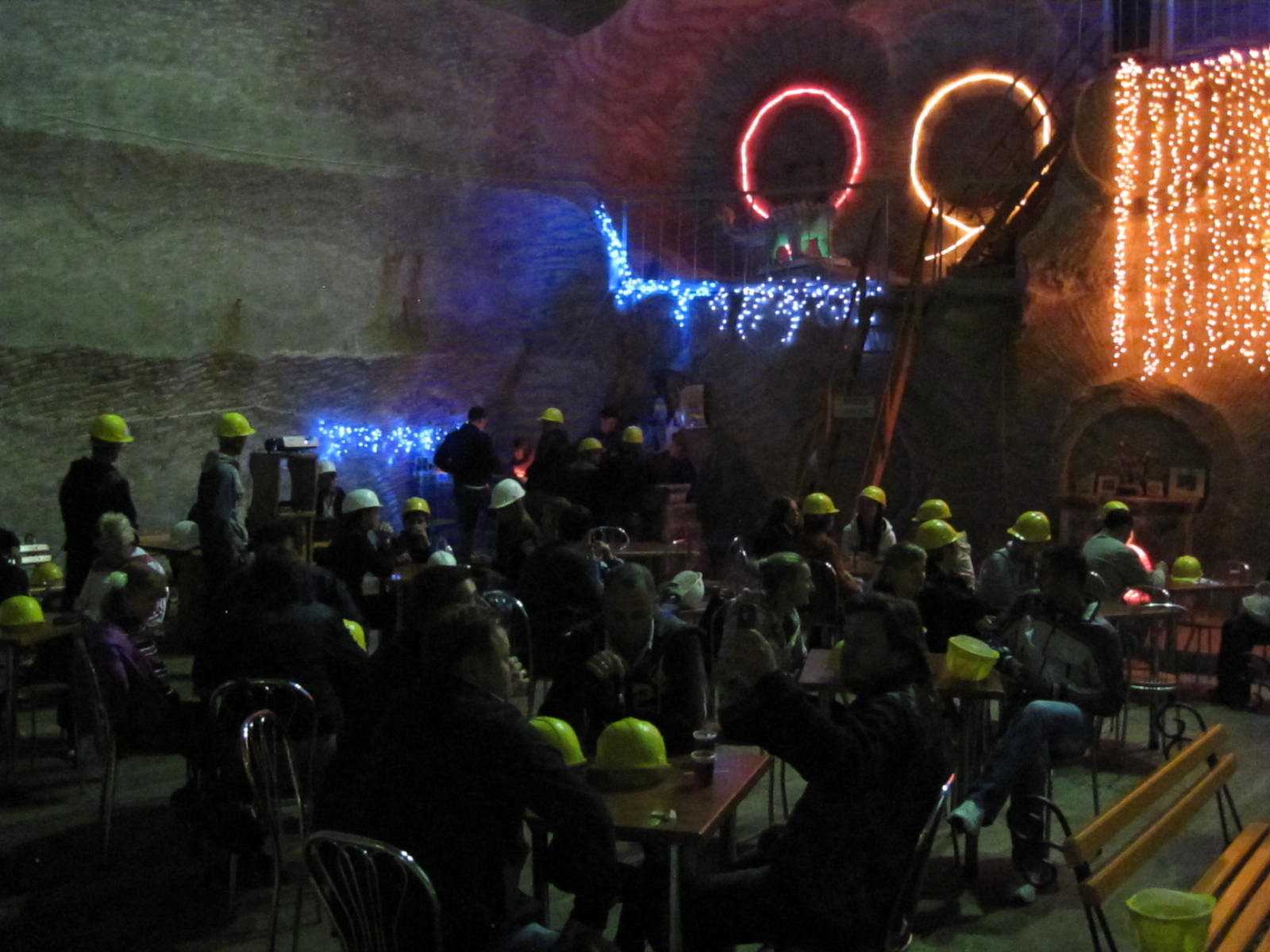
The underground "concert hall" in Soledar's mines

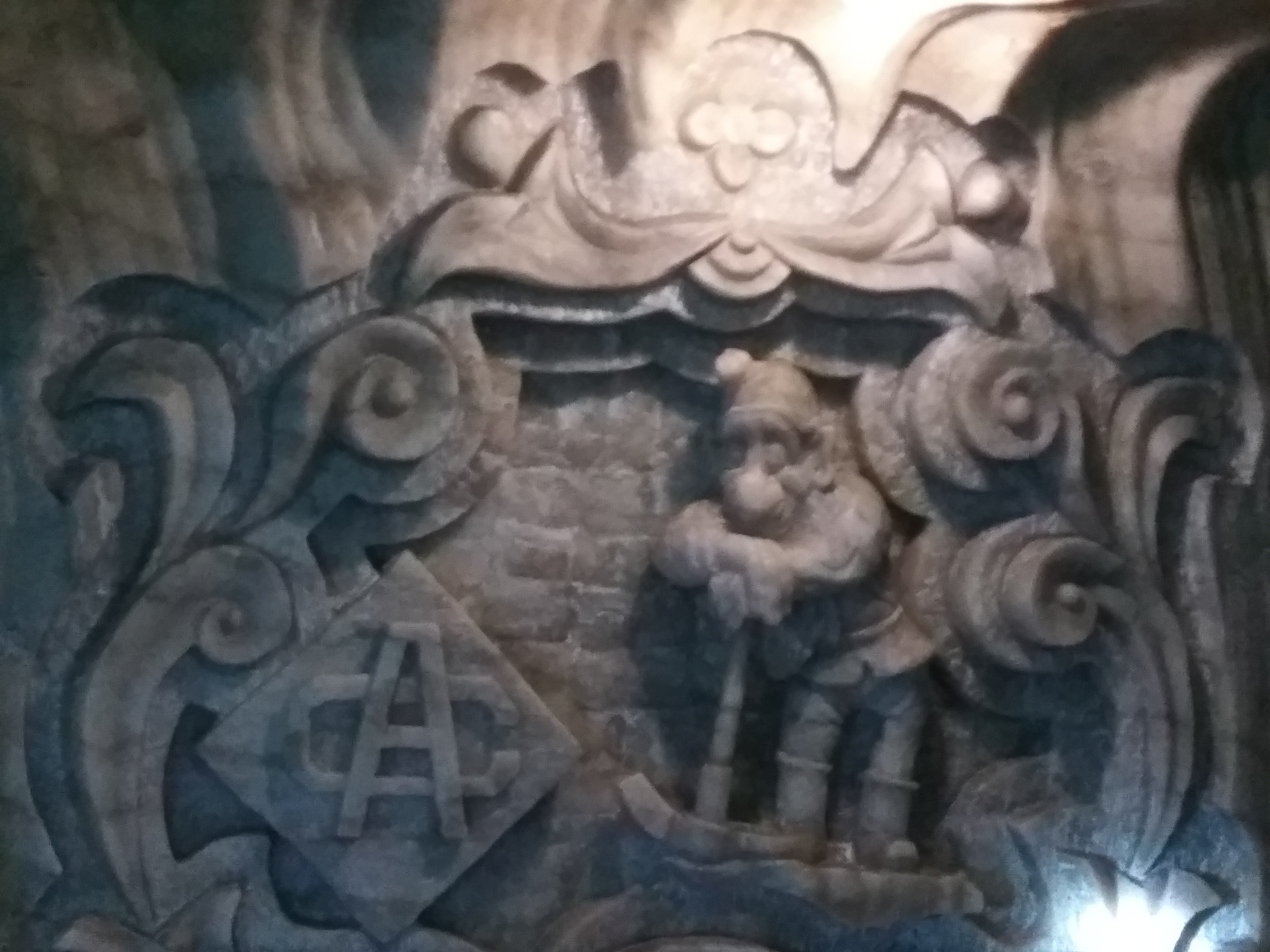
Sculptures from Salt

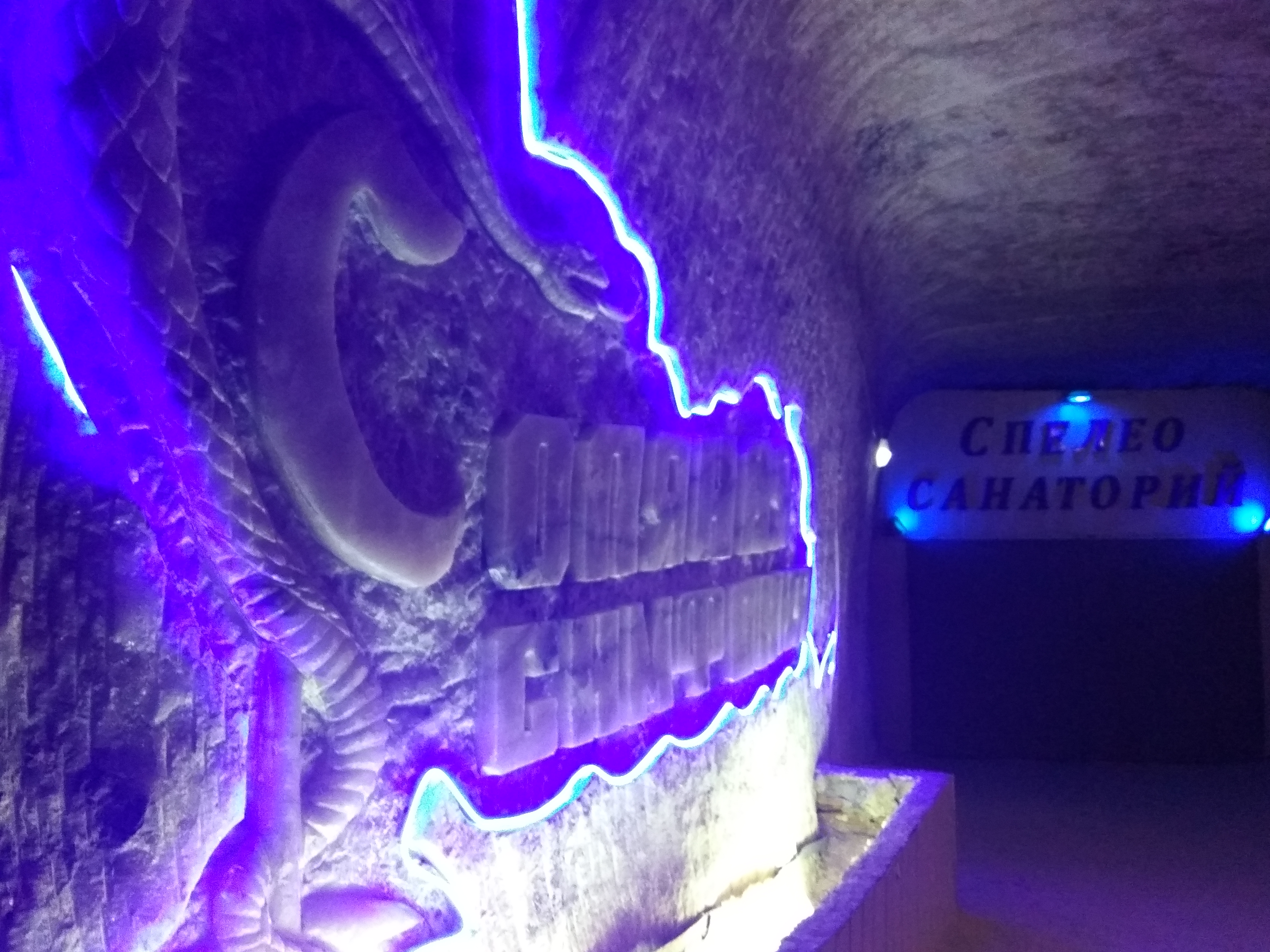
A sign in the salt mine

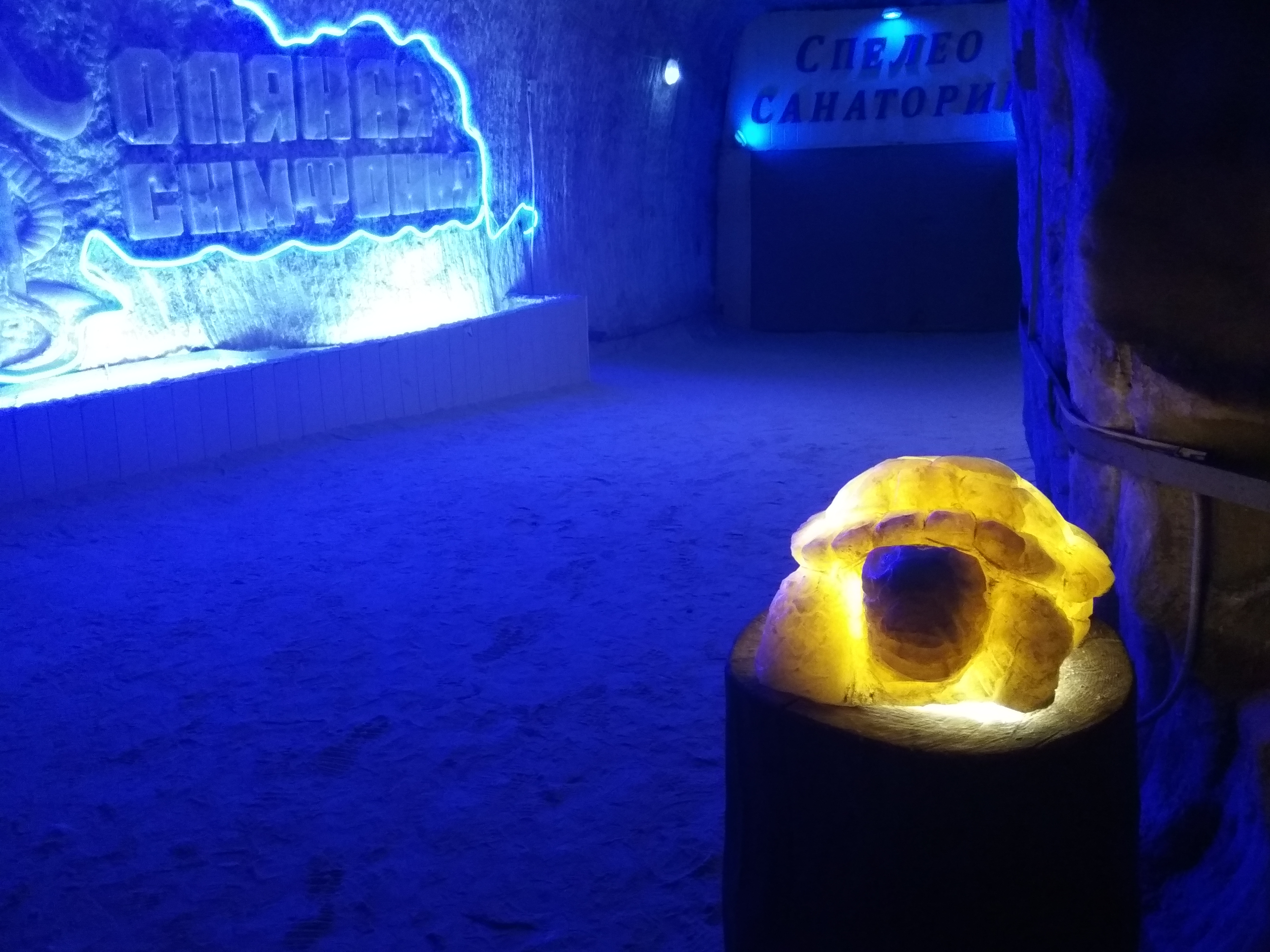
Inside Soledar salt mine

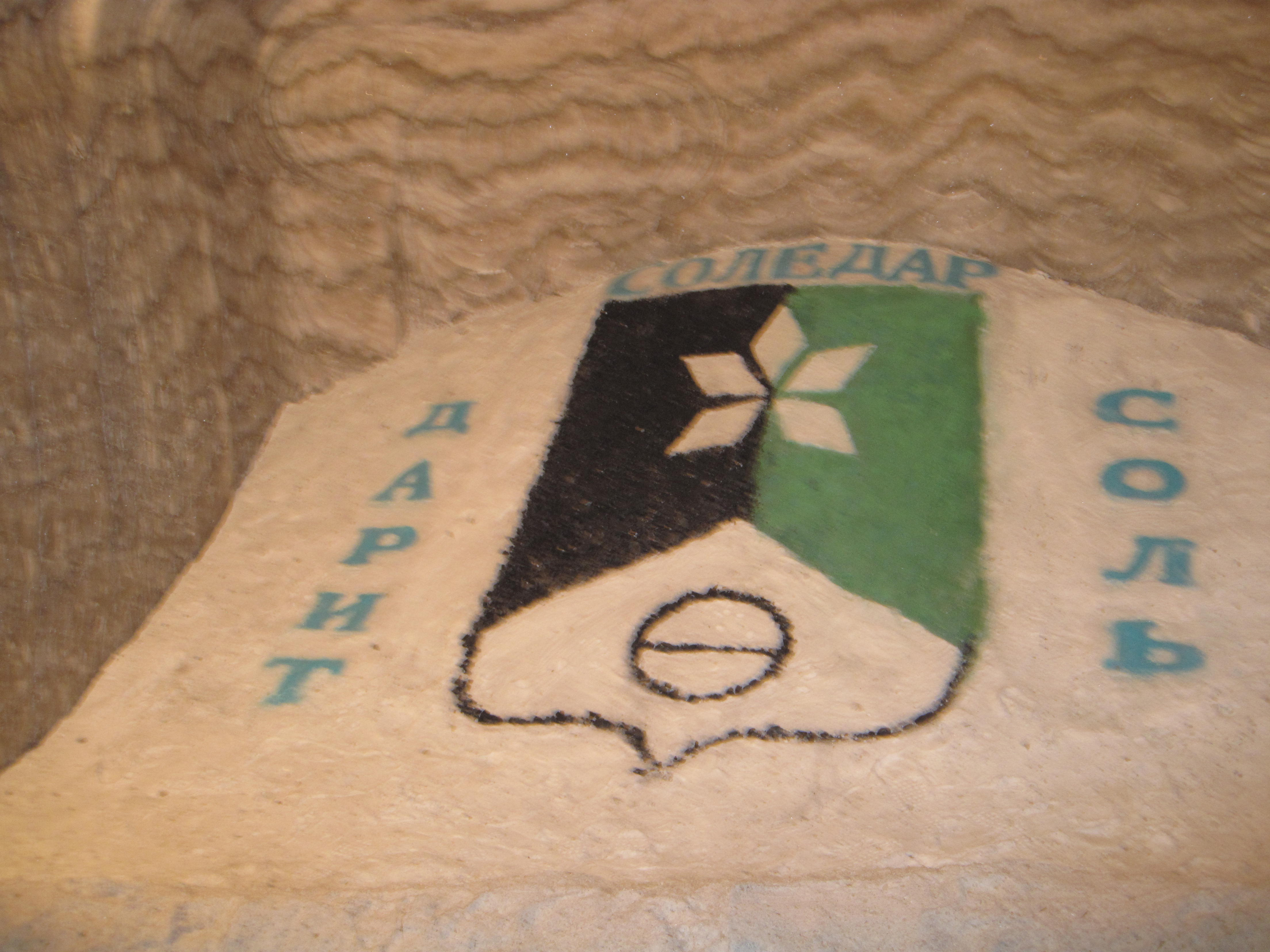
Soledar crest in the salt mine

== See also ==
- Wieliczka Salt Mine
