= Lenin Square, Donetsk =

Urban square in Donetsk, Ukraine

Lenin Square
- Площа Леніна; Площадь Ленина
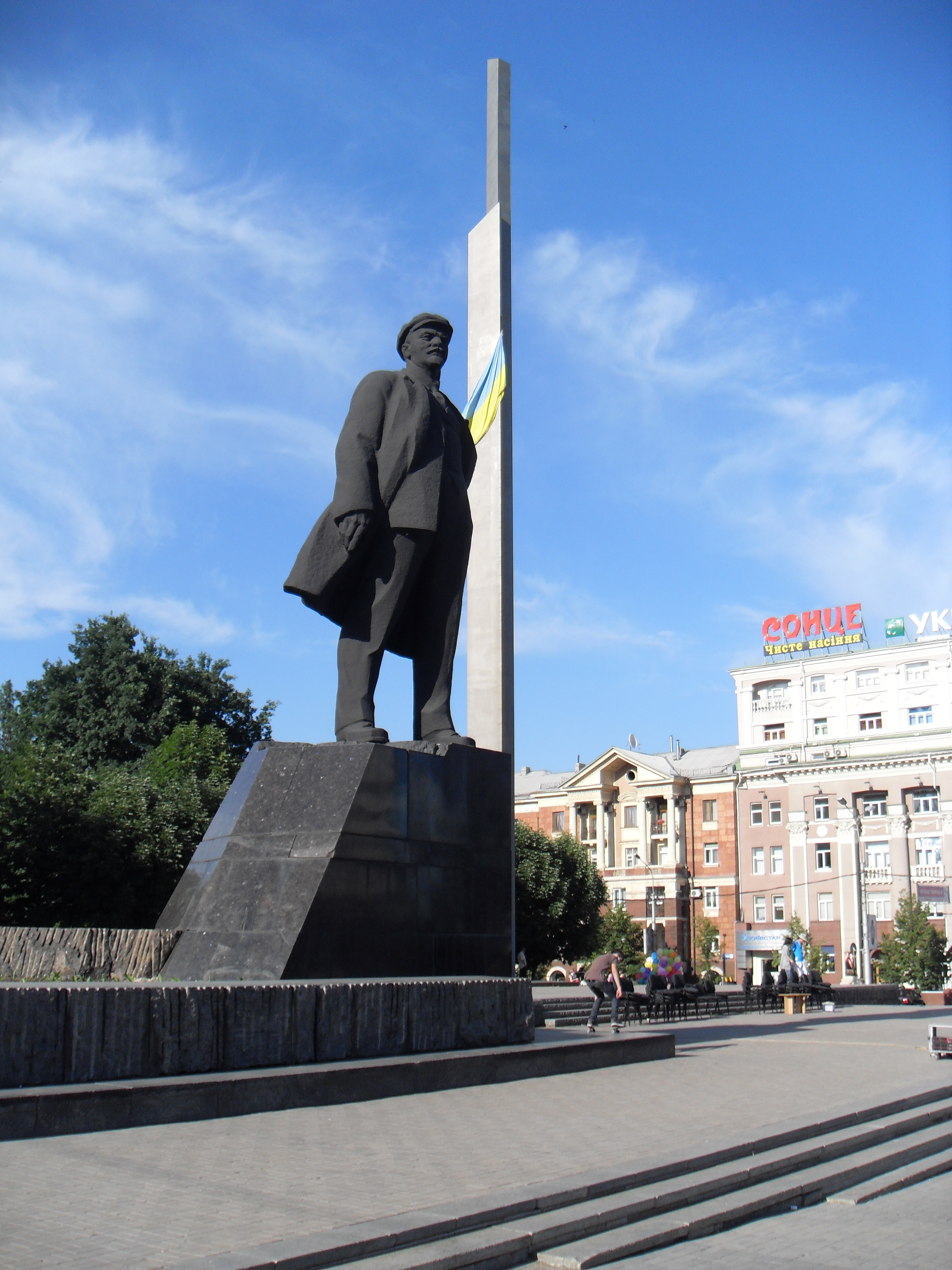
- The statue of Lenin on the square
- Interactive map of Lenin Square
- Type: Square
- Location: Donetsk, Ukraine (Claimed and controlled by Russian Federation)

Construction
- Construction start: 1927
- Completion: 1967

Other
- Known for: The Central square of Donetsk

Lenin Square (Ukrainian: Площа Леніна, romanized: Ploshcha Lenina, Russian: Площадь Ленина, romanized: Ploshchad Lenina) is the main square in Donetsk, the capital of the Donetsk Oblast in Ukraine. It is located between the streets of Artem, Postyshev, Gurov, and Komsomolskiy Avenue.

It was formed between 1927 and 1967. In 1967, to commemorate the 50th anniversary of the Bolshevik revolution, a monument to Lenin was erected on Lenin's Square.

Many notable events have occurred on the square recently, including the following:

- The protest by pro-Russian separatists against the Ukrainian government took place on the square.
- Parades of the separatist government in honor of Victory Day, May 1, and the founding of the DPR take place on the square.

== Landmarks ==
- Donbass Palace
- Donetsk Symphony Orchestra
- Donetsk National Academic Ukrainian Musical and Drama Theatre
- Ministry of Coal Industry of Ukraine
- Executive Committee of the Voroshilovsky district

== Gallery ==
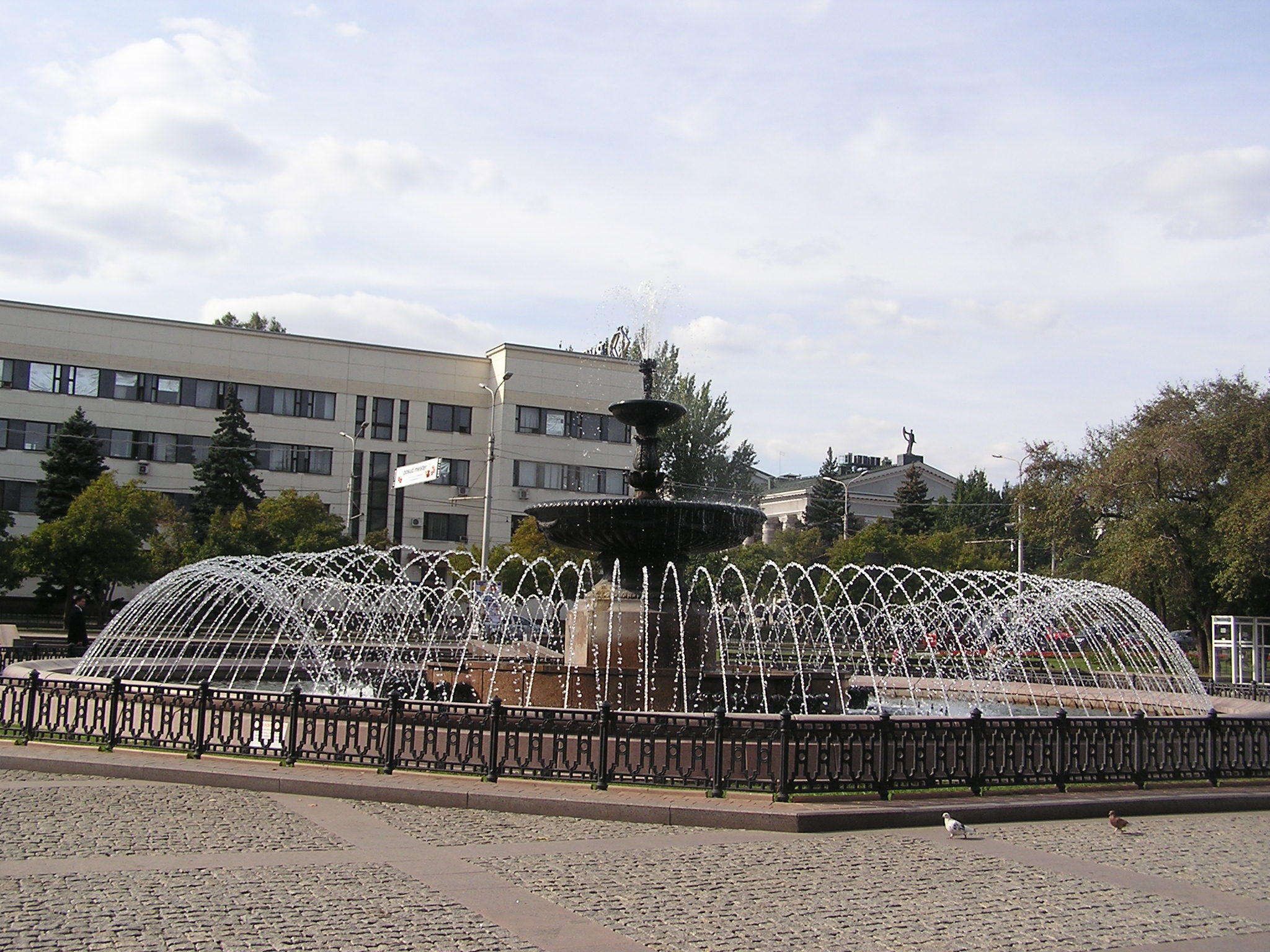

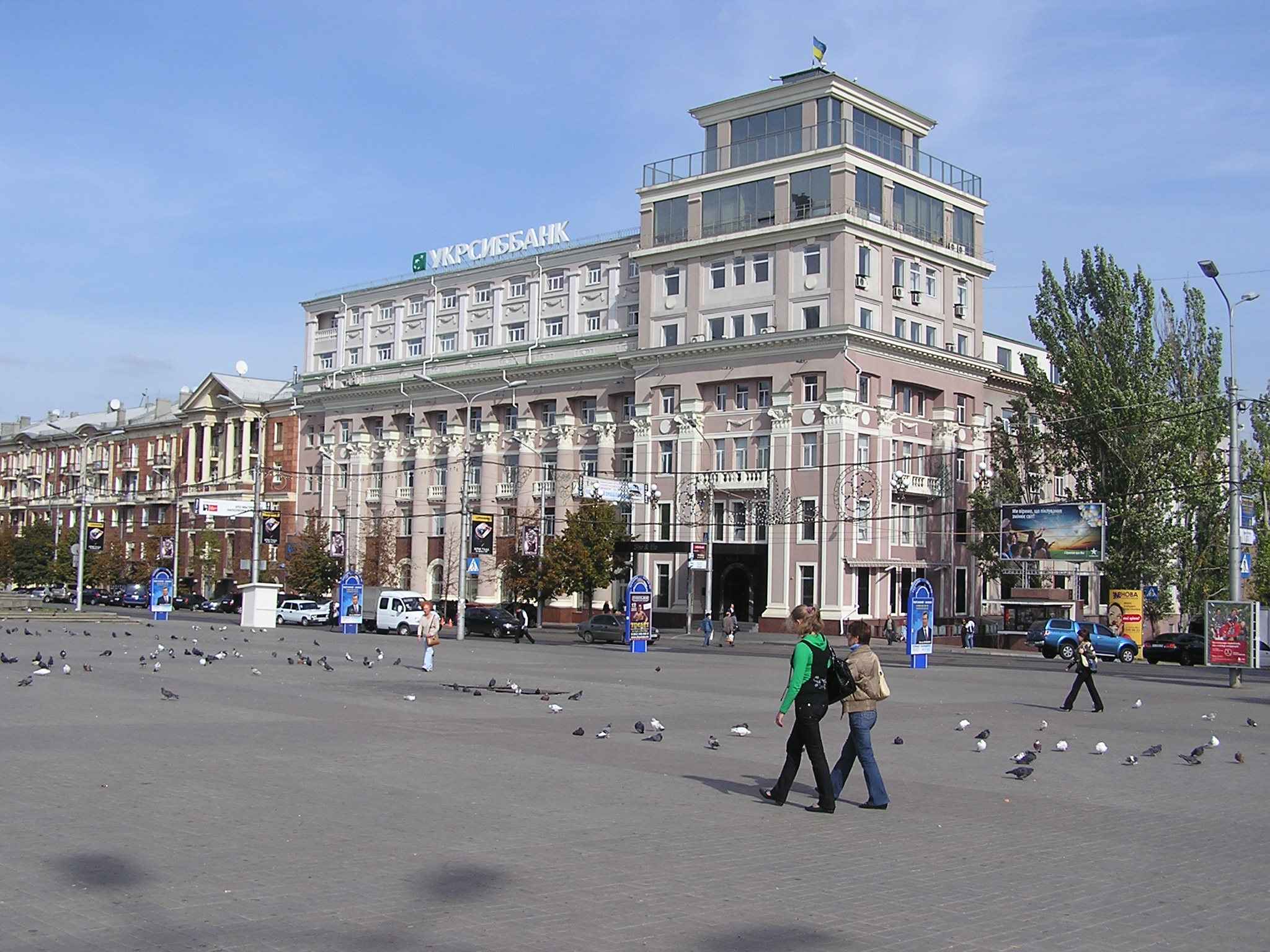

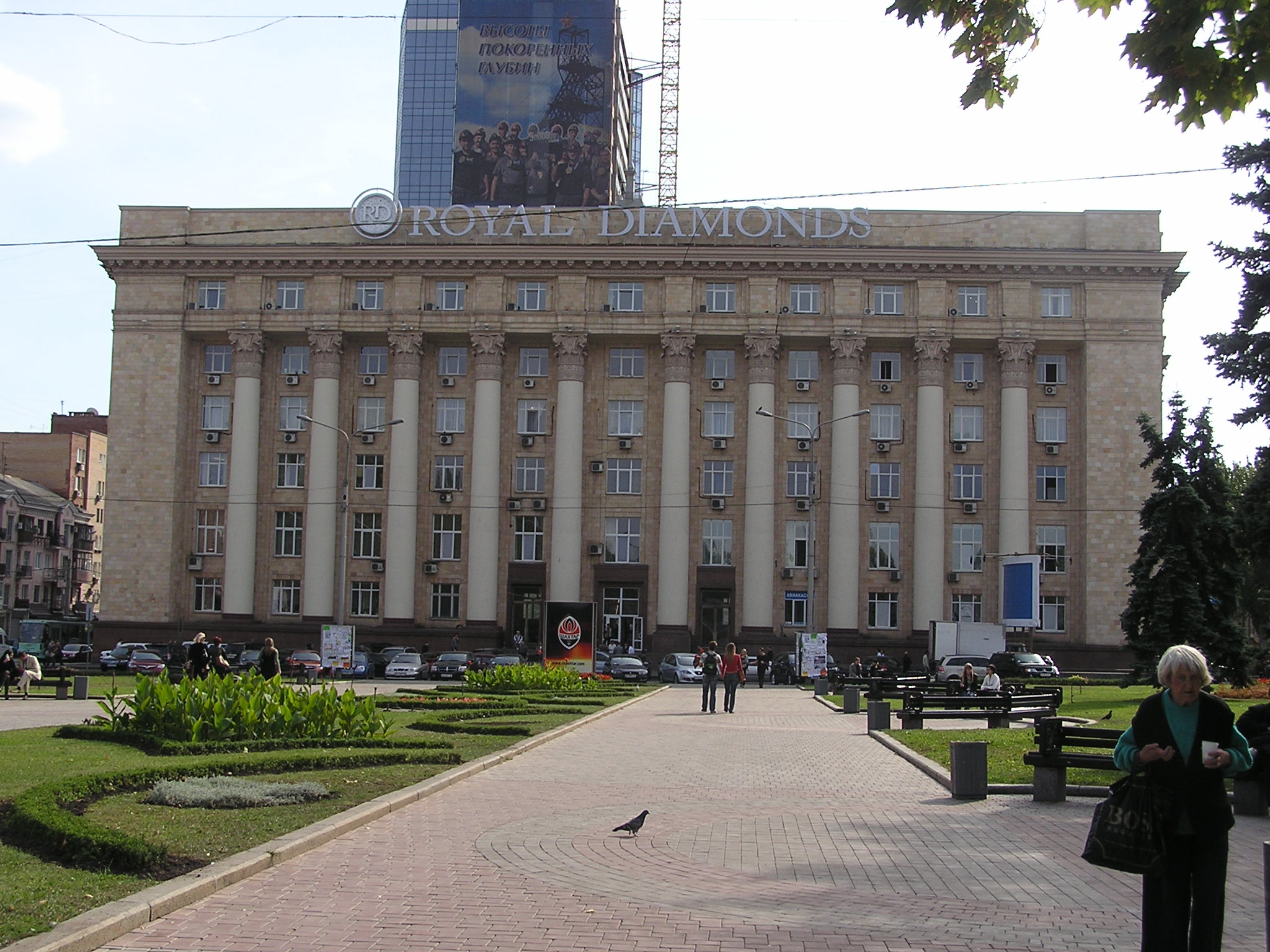

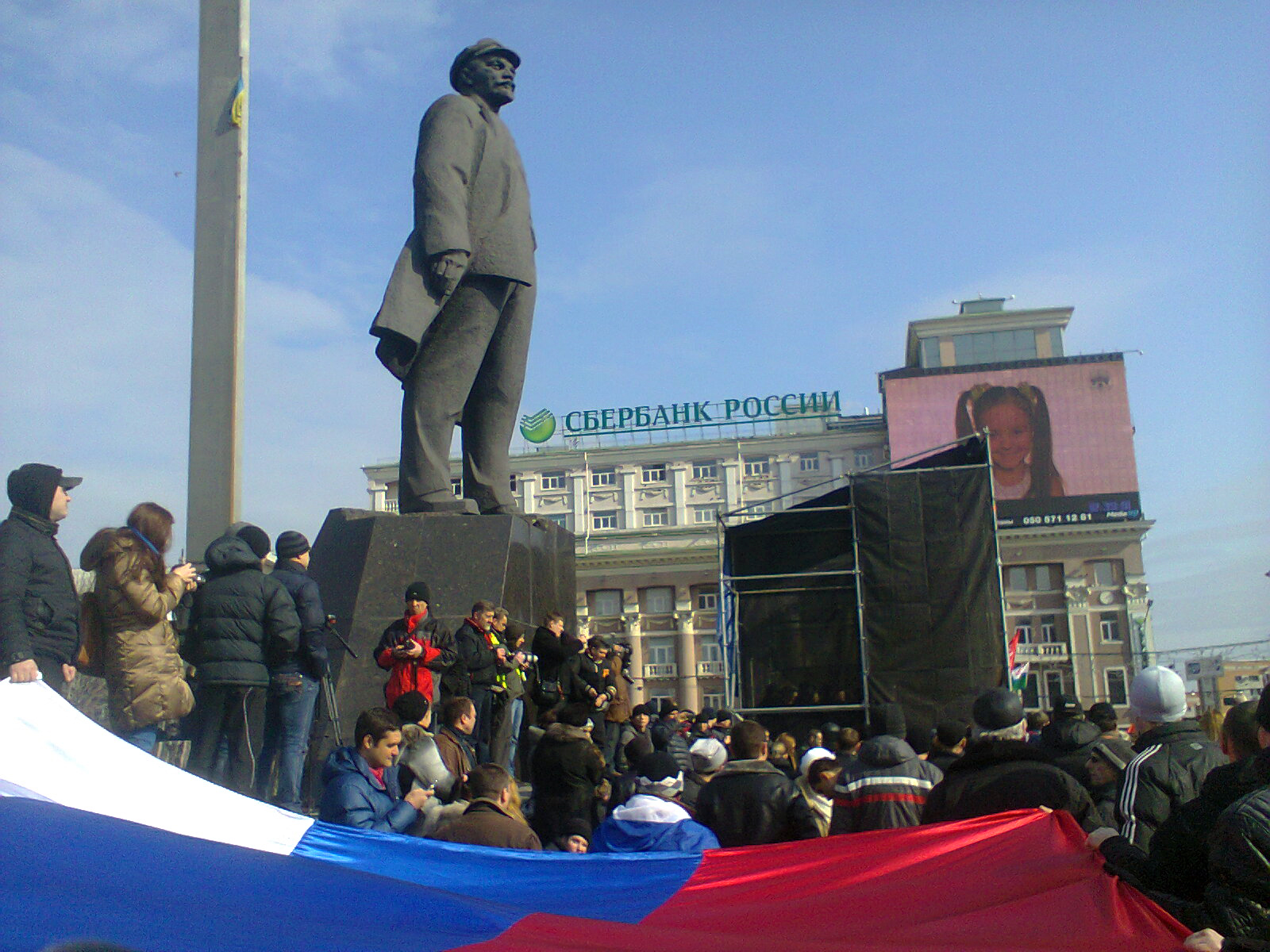

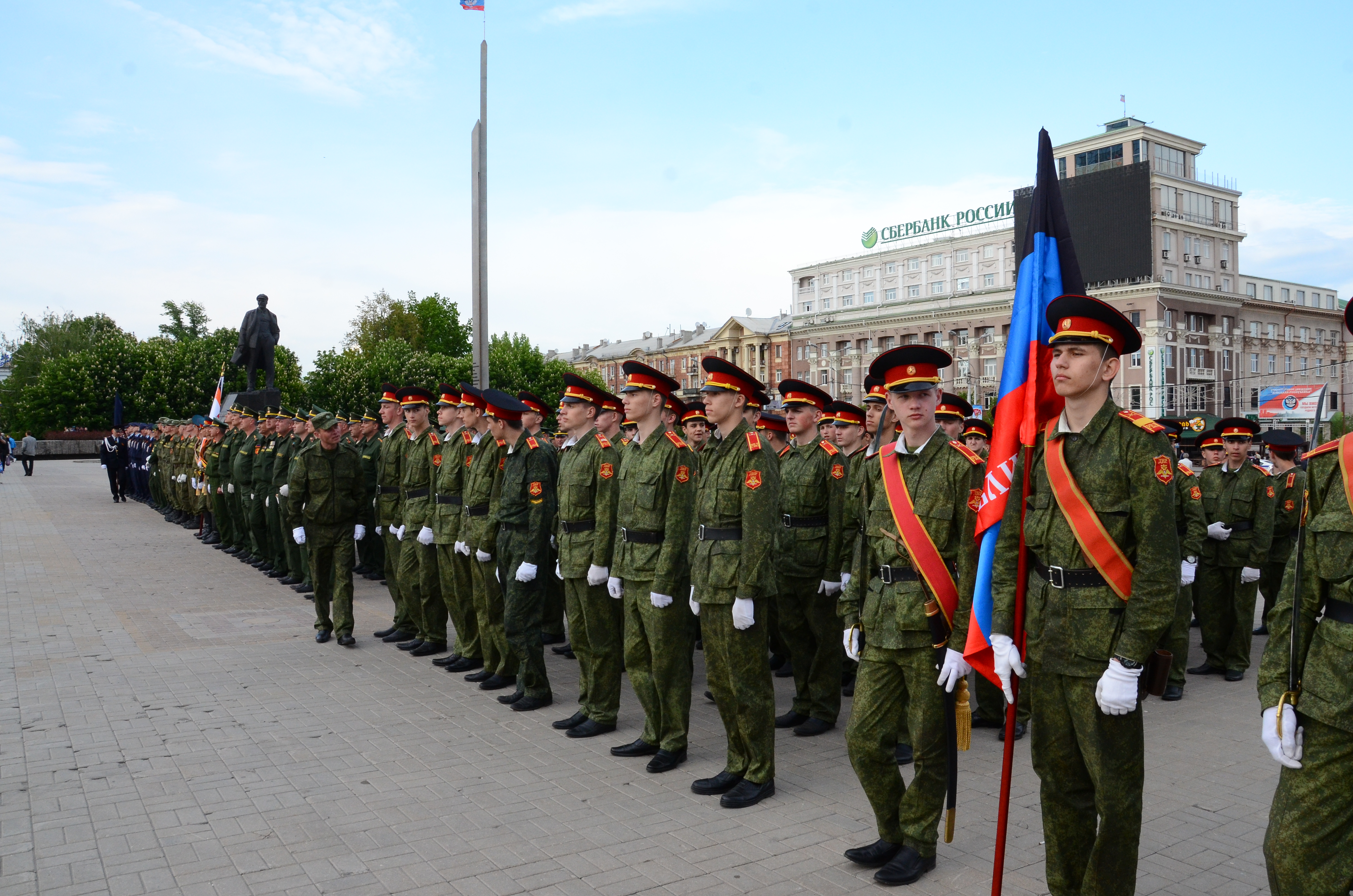

== See also ==
- Donetsk
- List of places named after Vladimir Lenin
