= Battle of Soledar =

Battle in the Russo-Ukrainian war

- Part of the Battle of Bakhmut in the Russo-Ukrainian war
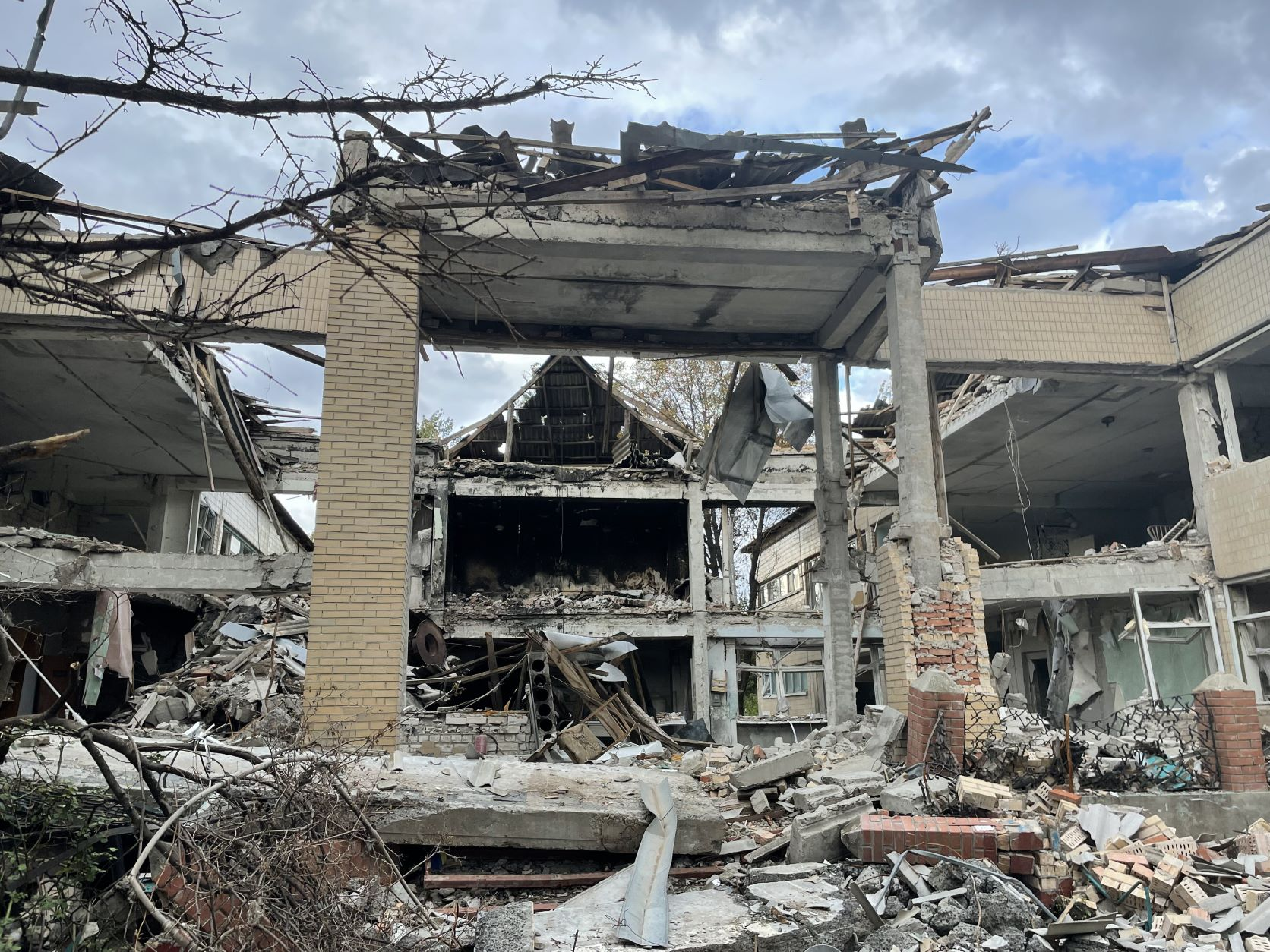
Date	3 August 2022 – 16 January 2023 (5 months, 1 week and 6 days)
Location	Soledar, Donetsk Oblast, Ukraine 48°41′27″N 38°04′27″E
Result	Russian victory
Territorial changes	Russian forces capture Soledar

Belligerents
Russia: Donetsk People's Republic; Luhansk People's Republic	Ukraine

Commanders and leaders
Valery Gerasimov; Anton Yelizarov	Oleksandr Syrskyi

Units involved
Russian Armed Forces: Russian Ground Forces; Irregulars; PMC Wagner; PMC Fakel; (Chechnya) "Akhmat" battalions; LPR Armed Forces (2nd Army Corps); 6th Cossack Regiment	Ukrainian Armed Forces: Ukrainian Air Assault Forces; 46th Airmobile Brigade; 77th Airmobile Brigade; Ukrainian Ground Forces; 93rd Mechanized Brigade; Ukrainian Volunteer Corps; Sheikh Mansur Battalion; National Guard of Ukraine; 17th Poltava Brigade

Casualties and losses
Hundreds killed	Hundreds killed

The Battle of Soledar was a series of military engagements in and around the urban-type settlement of Soledar during the Battle of Donbas in the Russo-Ukrainian war.

Russian forces began an offensive on 3 August 2022, shelling Soledar, Bakhmut, and surrounding villages to the south and east. Repeated local Russian assaults on or near Soledar continued into October, with many repelled by the Ukrainian army. By late December, much of the fighting in the region centered around Bakhmut, with Soledar seen as a satellite stronghold protecting the city's northeastern flank and supply lines. By this time, much of Soledar had been reduced to ruins.

Direct Russian assaults on Soledar resumed in late December 2022 and early January 2023, and on 16 January Russian forces captured the last sector of its industrial zone and secured control of the town, allowing the Russians to further threaten Bakhmut's northern and northeastern outskirts.

== Background ==
During the eastern Ukraine campaign in the Russo-Ukrainian war, Russian and separatist forces set their sights on seizing the Donbas region, consisting of Donetsk and Luhansk oblasts. Parts of these oblasts, including their capitals with the same names, were seized in pro-Russian uprisings in 2014. In late June and early July 2022, Luhansk Oblast fell under Russian control following the Ukrainian withdrawal from Sievierodonetsk and Lysychansk. The battlefield then shifted towards the cities of Bakhmut, Siversk, and Soledar, all key settlements in Donetsk Oblast.

The first shelling in Soledar began on 17 May, when Russian forces used drones and planes against Soledar, Klinove, and Vovchoiarivka. The next day, Donetsk Oblast governor Pavlo Kyrylenko said Russian forces had closed within 20 kilometers of Soledar, while shelling the settlement along with Bakhmut and Kostiantynivka. The Russian Ministry of Defense claimed Ukrainian ammunition warehouses were destroyed in Soledar during these campaigns. On 20 May, a Russian missile had hit and damaged the Soledar Salt Mine. By the end of May, Russian forces had only advanced 4 kilometers towards Soledar.

On 1 June, Russian shelling killed one person and wounded two others. Shelling continued on 6 June. On 16 June, Russian forces attempted to advance towards Soledar, but made no notable gains. Fighting intensified in early July after the fall of Sievierodonetsk and Lysychansk, with Russian forces shelling Soledar, Bakhmut, and nearby settlements on 3 July, along with advancing multiple kilometers. Through the rest of July, shelling and small Russian assaults continued. On the night of 9–10 July, "a dozen missiles" struck the cultural center in Soledar, with fires burning for days, as no firefighters responded. The Vuhlehirska power plant was captured on 26 July, effectively making Soledar the next key target along that axis.

Before the invasion, there were 15,000 inhabitants in Soledar. By late July, there were around 2,000 people remaining. The Soledar Salt Mine, shelled many times, had closed.

On 2 August, prominent Ukrainian nationalist and military officer Andriy Zhovanyk died in battle near Soledar. Reportedly, he died while serving as a company commander of the 4th tactical group of the Right Sector Ukrainian Volunteer Corps. Around fall 2022, high-ranking Ukrainian officer Oleksandr Syrskyi was put in charge of the defense of both Bakhmut and Soledar.

== Battle ==
=== Initial Russian advances (3 August – 1 October 2022) ===
On 3 August, the Ukrainian army announced that Russian forces had begun an offensive against the settlement of Soledar. Russian forces began shelling Soledar, Bakhmut, and surrounding villages to the south and east of the settlements. Pro-Russian media claimed that the renewed offensive had breached defense lines to the east and southeast, although these claims were denied by Ukrainian officials. Later that week, Russian and separatist forces had taken partial-to-full control of the Knauf Gips Donbas gypsum factory southeast of the settlement center. On 10 August, Russian forces also advanced in the Bilokamyanskyi refractory plant. The separatists said they had entered Soledar proper on 11 August, but the Ukrainians did not confirm this. The fighting in Soledar was described in the media as "grueling" and typified by artillery duels between troops entrenched around strategic points, located near hedgerows and tree lines along swathes of farmland, all while civilians fled to underground shelters and basements to avoid bombardment.

On 16 August, airstrikes and ground engagements continued around Soledar, and the LPR separatists claimed to have controlled most of the settlement's industrial zone, but there was no evidence they had advanced beyond the gypsum factory. On 19 August, shelling and clashes between the Ukrainian defenders and elements of the LPR forces continued on the eastern outskirts of the settlement, as the Ukrainian General Staff reported that Russian troops were attacking from the Stryapivka and Volodymyrivka directions. The Ukrainian General Staff reported it repelled Russian assaults near Soledar on 27 August. Clashes near the gypsum plant continued by 31 August.

On 8 September, Ukraine said it repelled another Russian assault in Soledar, while Russian sources claimed that Russian and DPR forces had advanced into Soledar's residential areas and were clashing with Ukrainian defenders. On 10 September, Russian sources claimed that the Russians had captured several blocks of territory around the gypsum factory.

=== Frontline stalls (2 October – 27 December 2022) ===
Repeated local Russian assaults on or near Soledar continued into October, with the Ukrainian General Staff reporting it repelled numerous assaults on Soledar throughout the month. On 19–20 October, Russian sources reported ongoing clashes in Soledar's industrial zone and that Russian troops had made minimal gains in the last five days. On 22–24 October, Russian sources reported the capture of an unspecified key street in the Soledar direction amid reports of ongoing house-to-house clashes in the area, particularly on Soledar's southeastern outskirts. The claims of Russian gains were not independently verified at the time.

Clashes in the Soledar-Bakhmut area reportedly intensified in early November, as Wagner Group fighters attempted to break Ukrainian defense lines in the area, seeking to encapsulate Bakhmut. The Ukrainians said they were repelling dozens of Russian attacks per day as the Soledar-Bakhmut-Donetsk city front became the epicenter of fighting in Ukraine, according to Ukrainian Deputy Defense Minister Hanna Maliar. The Wagner forces were led by frontline officer Anton Yelizarov, a paratrooper veteran who had "demonstrat[ed] competence across the shadow army's complete global portfolio". Despite this, the Russians made no notable gains in Soledar by 8 November. Clashes along the Soledar-Bakhmut front continued into December, with President Volodymyr Zelenskyy referring to the fighting on 3 December as "the hottest, most painful. We do everything to help our boys in this direction." On 14–16 December, Russian sources claimed that Wagner fighters had concluded clearing operations in Yakovlivka, allowing for further assaults along Soledar's northeastern flank. The capture of Yakovlivka prompted Ukraine to deploy a reserve battalion to Soledar to reinforce the front line, according to an LPR military officer.

By late December 2022, much of the fighting in the region centered around Bakhmut, with Soledar, located 15 kilometers from Bakhmut, seen as a satellite stronghold protecting the city's northeastern flank and supply lines. Much of Soledar had been reduced to ruins amid continuous Russian shelling, air strikes, and minor ground assaults against Ukrainian resistance. Russian forces captured the village of Bakhmutske, located along Soledar's southern flank, on 27 December. On 29 December, Ukrainian presidential adviser Oleksii Arestovych said Ukraine was suffering "heavy troop losses" along the Soledar-Bakhmut front, although insisted Russian assault troops were suffering even higher casualties.

=== Russian breakthrough and capture (27 December 2022 – 16 January 2023) ===
Following the capture of Bakhmutske on 27 December, Russian forces, spearheaded by Wagner Group fighters, began storming Soledar from the south and east. In January 2023, the last 500 civilians, mostly elderly, began fleeing Soledar. Around this time, Russian top commander in Ukraine, Valery Gerasimov, personally took charge of the operations against Soledar. Russian sources claimed that Russian forces seized the Dekonska railway station on the southern outskirts of Soledar on 4 January 2023. On 5 January, the Russian Ministry of Defence claimed to have pushed Ukrainian forces back to the Soledar Salt Mine. The Ukrainian General Staff claimed there were seventy-six artillery assaults on Soledar on 7 January alone, with the 46th Airmobile Brigade in charge of defending much of the settlement. On 9 January, Ukrainian Colonel Yuriy Yurchik was killed by artillery fire while defending Soledar.

On 10 January, the British Ministry of Defence stated that Russia "likely" controlled almost all of Soledar, and the top Russian priority was control of the tunnels leading into the Soledar Salt Mine. Between 10 and 13 January, the Russian defence ministry and Wagner Group leader Yevgeny Prigozhin repeatedly claimed Russian forces had fully captured Soledar, especially after securing portions of Soledar's center, however the Ukrainian defence ministry continued to deny Russian control of the settlement, stating that pockets of resistance still existed in the center, and that Ukraine still held on to the western portion of Soledar, including the Sil railway station. Ukrainian Deputy Defense Minister Hanna Maliar wrote that "battles continue [in Soledar]", and said Ukrainian fighters were "bravely trying to maintain the defence." Meanwhile, President Zelenskyy thanked the 46th and 77th Airmobile Brigades for their defense of the settlement.

The Institute for the Study of War (ISW), an American think tank and war observer, reported that Russia had likely captured Soledar proper on 11 January and were conducting clearing operations by 12 January. On 14 January, the ISW reported that Ukrainian elements still controlled some territory within Soledar's administrative borders, particularly a mine (known as mine #7) on the westernmost outskirts of the settlement, but no longer held positions within Soledar proper. The ISW could not confirm who controlled the Sil railway station at the time. Ukraine's 46th Airmobile Brigade said their troops were surrounded but were resisting Russian advance into Soledar's northwestern edge.

On 16 January, The Kyiv Independent reported that Russian troops had full control over the administrative territory of Soledar, citing a Ukrainian military source. Ukrainian drone unit commander Robert "Madyar" Brovdi confirmed that Russia had captured Soledar's last industrial zone, located near mine #7. The Ukrainian government did not officially confirm the loss of Soledar until 25 January, when Ukrainian authorities stated their troops had retreated from the front line settlement.

== Casualties and humanitarian impact ==
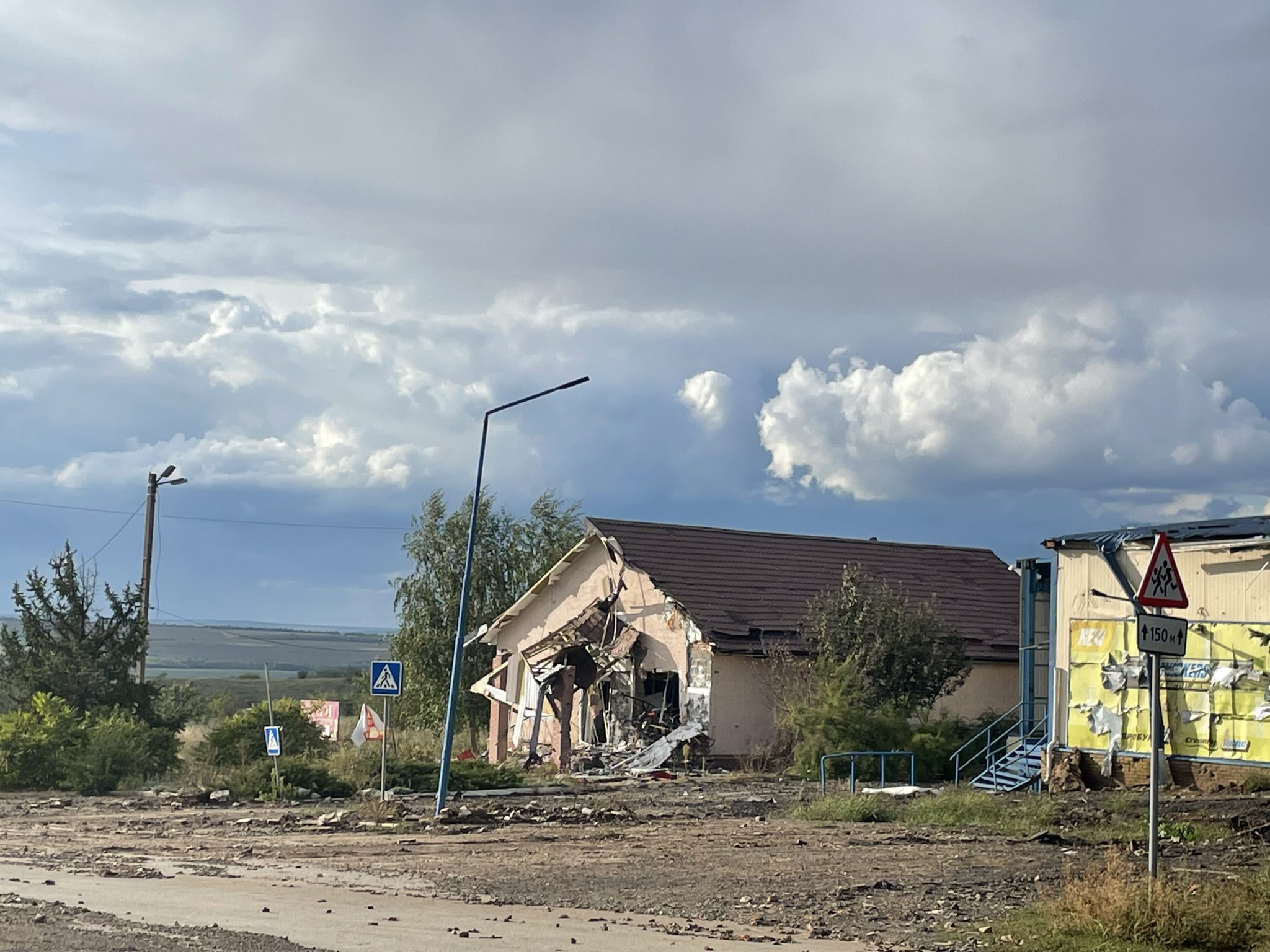
A destroyed house in Soledar

On 9 January 2023, two British nationals working with a humanitarian aid agency, Andrew Bagshaw and Christopher Parry, went missing while driving from Kramatorsk to Soledar. On 11 January, Wagner Group said the body of one of the aid workers was found and passports belonging to both of them were discovered with the body. On 24 January they were reported by their families to have been killed when their car was hit by an artillery shell.

=== Military casualties ===
In January 2023, in an interview with CNN, a Ukrainian soldier from the 46th Airmobile Brigade revealed that the death toll was very high and the ranks of Ukrainian troops were being replenished. He added that "in Soledar, no one counts the dead".

On 11 January, Ukrainian presidential adviser Mykhailo Podolyak described the fighting ongoing at Bakhmut and Soledar as the bloodiest since the start of the invasion. On 12 January, Yevgeny Prigozhin claimed Wagner forces had killed around 500 Ukrainian soldiers in Soledar. On 13 January, Ukraine claimed to have killed over 100 Russian soldiers in the Soledar area using various special forces actions, artillery fire, anti-tank units, and a Tochka-U missile. Ukrainian troops claimed that Wagner fighters were lightly armed and suffered heavy losses during daily assaults. One interviewed Ukrainian soldier alleged that 10–15 Russians died per day at one point during the battle, although this was never independently verified. Historian Nikolay Mitrokhin assessed the number of losses by the Russian side as 25,000 killed, with the same number being killed in Bakhmut.

RIA FAN, a pro-Russian media outlet linked to Prighozin, reported on 21 January that Wagner planned to return the bodies of Ukrainian soldiers killed in Soledar back to Ukrainian authorities.

On 25 January, Ukrainian military spokesman Serhiy Cherevatyi claimed no Ukrainian troops were captured during the battle.

=== Impact on civilians ===
By 13 January 2023, the Ukrainian regional governor Pavlo Kyrylenko said that "559 civilians including 15 children" remained in Soledar and could not be evacuated.

The OCHA announced on 20 January that it delivered humanitarian aid to 800 people near Soledar, offloading the supplies in Ukrainian-controlled territory. The OCHA did not give an exact location of the convoy's destination nor explain how it secured the safety of the convoy, only that it came from Dnipro and that both the Ukrainians and Russians were notified in advance. It was the first such delivery to the area by an international body since the invasion.

== Analysis ==
The Institute for the Study of War (ISW), a U.S.-based think tank that has monitored the Russian invasion of Ukraine, assessed on 8 August 2022 that Russian forces were likely seeking to envelop Bakhmut by capturing Soledar, located north of the city, and Zaitseve, south of Bakhmut. The Russians wanted to set conditions to disrupt Ukrainian control over the T0513 trunk road that supports Ukrainian frontline positions in northeast Donetsk Oblast, the ISW continued.

Following the capture of Bakhmutske and lack of momentum in Bakhmut in late December 2022, analysts believed Russia would transfer troops to launch an attack on Soledar in early January 2023. On 13 January, Ukrainian Defence Minister Oleksii Reznikov called the fighting "very difficult" and said aggressive tactics by PMC Wagner mercenaries resulted in high casualties. Reznikov said he believed Wagner was fighting for control of the mineral wealth offered by the mines in the region. Radio Free Europe/Radio Liberty correspondent Maryan Kushnir, embedded with a Ukrainian assault battalion during the battle, described the Soledar battle as a "flanking fight" amid freezing temperatures and frozen ground.

In January 2023, as the Russians advanced into Soledar, analysts began dismissing the strategic value of the settlement, assessing that a Russian victory in Soledar would be pyrrhic at best. John Kirby of the U.S. National Security Council, who supports Ukraine, said on 12 January that "even if both Bakhmut and Soledar fall to the Russians, it's not going to have a strategic impact on the war itself". The Kyiv Independent reported on 22 January that the fall of Soledar was at least tactically significant and jeopardized Ukrainian positions defending Bakhmut's northern flank and supply routes.

== See also ==
- Battle of Bakhmut
- List of military engagements during the Russian invasion of Ukraine
