= 17th Poltava Brigade =

17th Separate Poltavska Brigade
- 17-а окрема Полтавська бригада (Ukrainian)
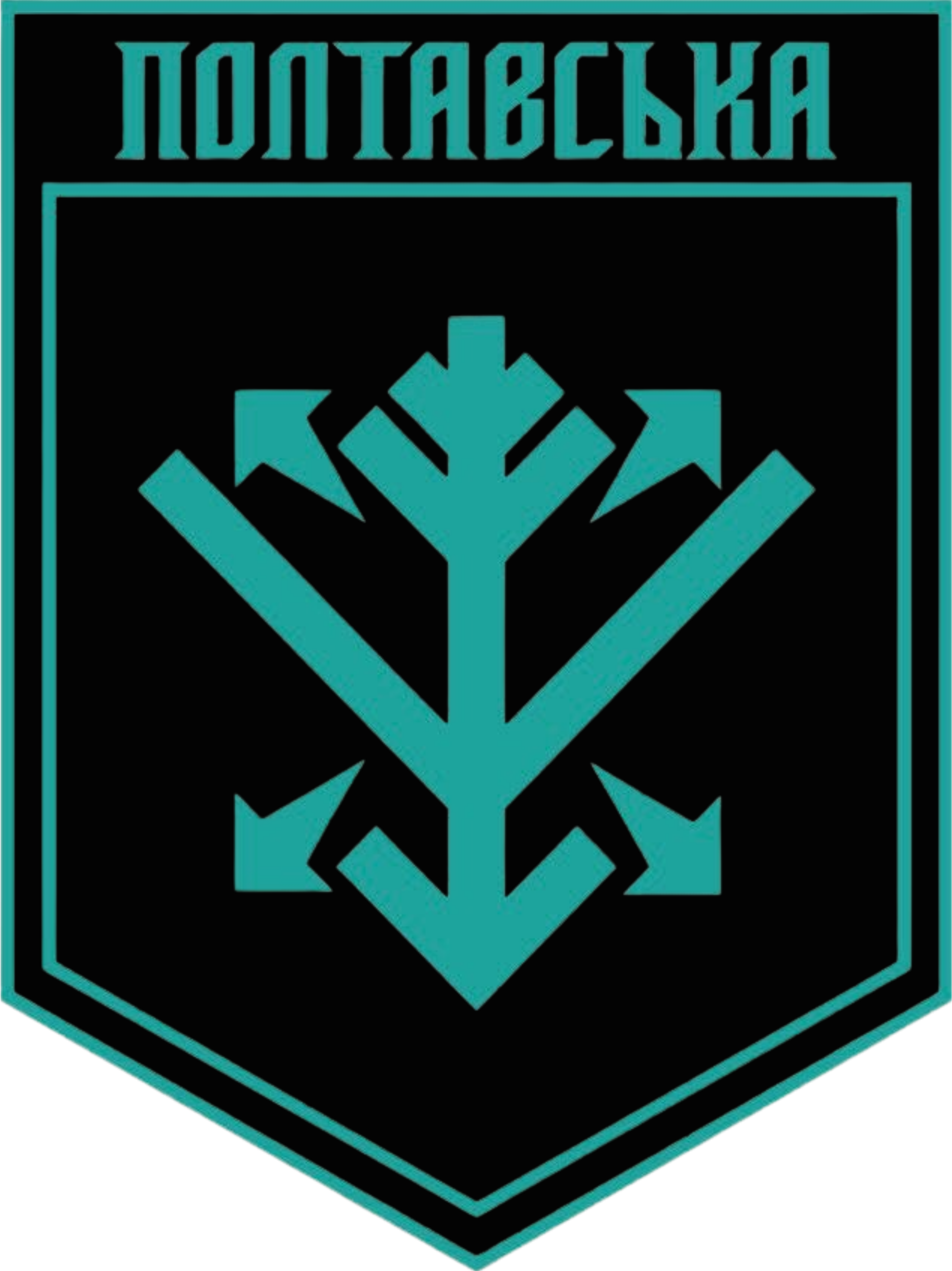
- Brigade Insignia
- Founded: 1992
- Country: Ukraine
- Allegiance: Ministry of Internal Affairs
- Branch: National Guard of Ukraine
- Type: Brigade
- Role: Extraction, logistical and combat support, maintenance of the public law and order, protection of the Ukrainian territorial integrity
- Part of: National Guard of Ukraine
- Garrison/HQ: Poltava
- Nickname: Poltavska
- Engagements: Russo-Ukrainian war: War in Donbas; Russian invasion of Ukraine; Battle of Kupiansk; 2022 Kharkiv counteroffensive; Battle of Soledar; Battle of Bakhmut; 2023 Ukrainian counteroffensive; 2024 Velyka Novosilka offensive

Commanders
- Current commander: Colonel Andriy Halushchak
- Notable commanders: Colonel Pustovoitov Anatoly Anatoliyovych †

The 17th Separate Mixed Poltavska Brigade is a brigade of the National Guard of Ukraine tasked with protection of public law and order, important state facilities, foreign diplomatic missions and Ukrainian territorial integrity. It was established on 19 March 1993 as the 12th Separate Battalion. It is headquartered in Poltava, from where it takes its nickname Poltavska.

== History ==
The unit was established on 19 March 1993, as 12th Separate Battalion of the National Guard of Ukraine.

Following the Dissolution of the National Guard it was then transferred to the Internal Troops of Ukraine. In 2014, after the reestablishment of the National Guard of Ukraine, it was transferred there. It took part in the War in Donbas during which the commander of the battalion (Pustovoitov Anatoly Anatoliyovych) was killed on 25 July 2015.

Following the Russian invasion of Ukraine, the unit has taken part in multiple engagements throughout the entire front including the liberation of Udy during the Battle of Kupiansk. It also took part in the 2022 Kharkiv counteroffensive, and operated in the Donetsk Oblast engaging in the Battle of Soledar and the Battle of Bakhmut. In 2023, the 12th battalion was enlarged and became the 32nd Separate Regiment of the National Guard. The regiment was again expanded on late 2023 becoming the 17th Brigade. The brigade took part in the 2023 Ukrainian counteroffensive during which a soldier of the brigade (Oleg Volodymyrovych Lychak) was killed on 8 November 2023 as a result of mortar shelling in Verbove.

== Structure ==
The structure of the brigade is as follows:

- 17th Separate Poltavska Brigade
  - Management and Headquarters
  - Patrol Company
  - Rifle Company
  - Combat and Logistical Support Platoon
  - Informational warfare Platoon
  - Automobile platoon
  - Medical Center

== Commanders ==
- Colonel Pustovoitov Anatoly Anatoliyovych †(?-2015)
- Colonel Serhii Regeda (2017-?)
- Colonel Andriy Halushchak (?-)

== Sources ==
- Командир військової частини 3052 привітав особовий склад в АТО
- У Полтавській військовій частині 3052 служитимуть близько десяти гвардійців
- Нацгвардійці військової частини 3052 відвідали концерт Володимира Ромаскевича
- До військової частини 3052 прибула інспекційна група
