= Roman Krasnovsky =

Israeli composer, teacher, and pianist

Roman Krasnovsky רומן קראסנובסקי
- Born: 1955; Donetsk, Ukrainian SSR, USSR
- Genres: Baroque, classical, romantic, modern
- Occupation(s): Teacher, organist, composer
- Instrument(s): Organ, piano, harpsichord, celesta
- Years active: 1993-present

Roman Krasnovsky (Hebrew: רומן קראסנובסקי; born 1955) is an Israeli composer, teacher, pianist, organist, and harpsichordist.

== Early career and education ==
Krasnovsky was born in 1955 in Donetsk. His father was an orchestra player. At the age of five, Krasnovsky started to play the piano. He acquired a comprehensive music education in the schools and conservatories in the Soviet Union. He studied composition with the composer Aram Khachaturian at the Moscow Conservatory after graduating from high school. Despite Krasnovsky's wish to be a composer, Khachaturian advised him to focus on playing. Krasnovsky began performing as a soloist with the Symphony Orchestra of Donetsk Philharmonic Society. After studying at a musical college, he continued his studies at the Academy of Arts in Kharkiv until 1979.

As a student, he played the piano, the harpsichord, and the celesta with the Symphony Orchestra of the Philharmonic Society of Kharkiv. During this period, he often played piano concertos by Rachmaninoff and Prokofiev, Rhapsody in Blue by Gershwin and the six concertos for harpsichord and string orchestra by Johann Sebastian Bach. During this period, he performed the complete works by Bach for harpsichord and accompanied international soloists, as violinist Viktoria Mullova.

Krasnovsky studied organ with Galina Kozlov at the City Conservatory of Gorky (now Nizhny Novgorod) from 1986 to 1989. He appeared in organ recitals throughout Ukraine and the Baltic states. To refine his music education, he participated in master classes with Leo Kremer from Speyer, Germany and with others. His main activity during this period was as organist, with the Symphony Orchestra of the Philharmonic Society of Kharkiv. However, he continued his activities as a pianist, harpsichordist and accompanied other artists.

== Career after immigration to Israel ==
Krasnovsky immigrated to Israel in 1990 and has lived there since then in Karmiel From 1993 to 1997 he taught at the Jerusalem Academy of Music and Dance. Since 1997, he has been teaching the piano at the conservatory of Karmiel. He plays the organ in various churches, including Church of the Redeemer and the Dormition in Jerusalem, as well as in other churches in Jaffa and Tabgha. He plays with chamber ensembles and appears as soloist with various orchestras, including the Israel Philharmonic Orchestra. He has also appeared on Israeli television, including on the famous Dan Shilon talk show.

Krasnovsky often performs as organist in Europe and the United States. In January 2008, he was invited to play the organ at Notre-Dame de Paris. Occasionally, he teaches courses in Westphalia, Germany and elsewhere.

After a long break of 20 years, Krasnovsky returned to composition and composed works for organ. One of them he composed following the Yitzhak Rabin assassination in 1995. His compositions acclaimed good critics in Europe.

Krasnovsky issued several CDs playing on various organs in Europe. His repertoire covers a wide and extensive range including baroque, classical, romantic, and modern. Among other things, he performed works by Poulenc and Messiaen. He also issued a CD containing his three organ symphonies, including the "Jewish Symphony".
