= 46th Airmobile Brigade =

Ukrainian Air Assault Forces unit

- 46-та окрема аеромобільна бригада
- Shoulder sleeve insignia
- Active: December 23, 2016 – today
- Country: Ukraine
- Branch: Ukrainian Air Assault Forces
- Role: Air assault forces
- Size: Brigade
- Garrison/HQ: Poltava, Poltava Oblast
- Motto: Always ready!
- Engagements: Russo-Ukrainian War; War in Donbas; Russian invasion of Ukraine; Battle of Bakhmut; Battle of Soledar; 2023 Ukrainian counteroffensive; Battle of Kurakhove
- Decorations: For Courage and Bravery
- Website: https://www.facebook.com/oaembr46

Commanders
- Current commander: Col. Valeriy Skred

The 46th Airmobile Brigade "Podilsk" (Ukrainian: 46-та окрема аеромобільна Подільська бригада; 46 ОАеМБр; Military Unit Number A4350) is a brigade of the Ukrainian Air Assault Forces formed in 2016, based in Poltava.

== History ==
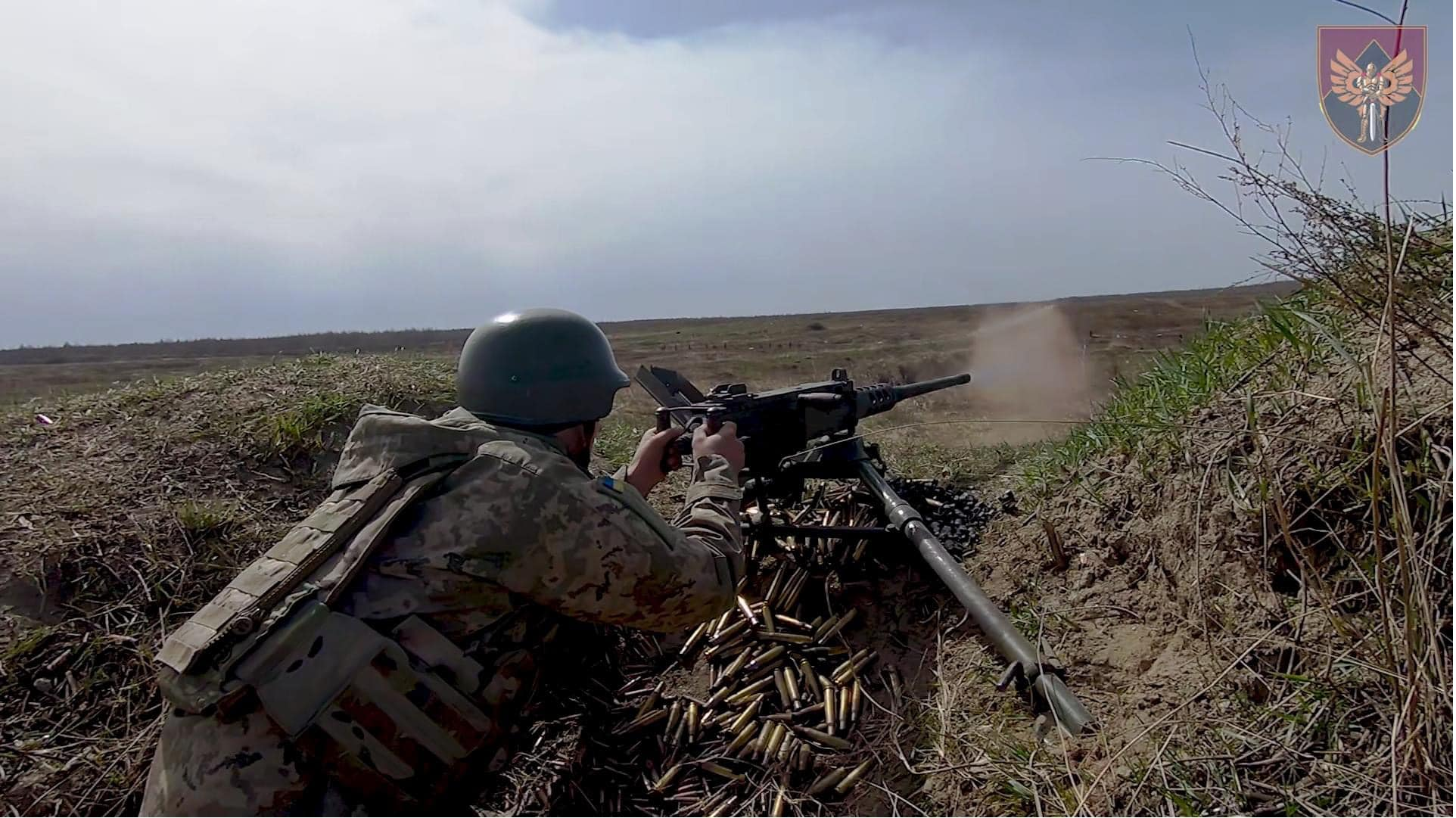
Ukrainian 46th Air Assault Brigade soldier firing an M2 Browning machine gun, 2022

The United Kingdom offered the Ukrainian government training on British soil for Ukrainian recruits, and the 46th Air Assault Brigade was one of the selected brigades. Fresh Western supplies, like as Wolfhound MRAPs and Husky TSV tactical vehicles, were also delivered to the brigade. The Brigade was converted from a heavy assault brigade to a light assault brigade. The 46th Airmobile Brigade took part in the Kherson operation after arriving from the United Kingdom.

The Brigade from Poltava was dubbed the 46th Airmobile Brigade. The unit also got a new emblem.

The unit was an integral part of the defense in Bakhmut and in Soledar, both of which have been the site of some of the most intense fighting in the war.

On March 13, 2023, the Washington Post published a news report after interviewing a then battalion commander of the 46th Airmobile Brigade Anatolii "Kupol" Kozel stating that Ukraine was short of skilled troops, munitions and was sustaining high losses as pessimism grew. In his interview, Anatolii "Kupol" Kozel admitted to getting 100 new soldiers every week who were poorly trained and that most of these soldiers would flee or refuse to fire their weapons as they were afraid of the sound of the shots. Anatolii "Kupol" Kozel was demoted to deputy commander after his interview and in response resigned from the Armed Forces of Ukraine. In the aftermath, a video of soldiers from the 46th Airmobile Brigade surfaced on various telegram channels protesting the demotion of Anatolii "Kupol" Kozel.

During the 2023 Ukrainian Counteroffensive the brigade was involved in Southern Ukraine campaign in the Zaporizhzhia Oblast Orikhiv direction.

In December 2023, the brigade's Garuda drone team began operating near Mar'inka, Donetsk Oblast.

On 20 September, the brigade claimed to have repulsed two Russian assaults, totaling 98 vehicles, over a week in defending Kurakhove. They claimed to have damaged or destroyed 44 of the attacking vehicles using tanks, artillery and thermite drones, while allegedly killing 72 Russians on the 20th alone.

The brigade claimed to have destroyed 100 armored vehicles, including tanks, in the Kurakhove area in October 2024.

In January 2025, the brigade commander, Colonel Vitaly Zolotarev, was reportedly removed from his post for the loss of Kurakhove.

On 29 April 2025, the brigade was awarded the honorary name "Podilsk" by decree of President Volodymyr Zelenskyy.

== Structure ==
As of 2023 the brigade's structure is as follows:

- 46th Air Assault Brigade, Poltava
  - Headquarters & Headquarters Company
  - 1st Airmobile Battalion
  - 2nd Airmobile Battalion
  - 3rd Airmobile Battalion
    - Anti-tank Company
    - Artillery Company
    - UAV Unit
  - 4th Airmobile Battalion
  - Artillery Group (equipped with 2S1 and BM-21 Grad)
    - Self-propelled howitzer-artillery division (2S1)
    - Howitzer Artillery Division (D-30)
    - Anti-tank battery
  - Anti-Aircraft Defense Battalion (equipped with Shilka)
  - Reconnaissance and Strike UAV Company "Garuda"
  - Support units (including engineers, communication, medics, and material support)
