= Eastern front of the Russo-Ukrainian war (2022–present) =

Ongoing military offensive in Ukraine

- Part of the Russo-Ukrainian war (2022–present)
- A map of the current situation in eastern Ukraine
Date	24 February 2022–present (4 years, 7 months, 1 week and 3 days)
Location	Eastern Ukraine (Donetsk, Luhansk, and Kharkiv regions)
Status	Ongoing
Territorial changes	Russia controls about 90% of the Donbas, which includes 99% of the Luhansk region, 80% of the Donetsk region, and "small parts" of the Kharkiv region as of October 2025

Belligerents
Russia; Donetsk People's Republic; Luhansk People's Republic	Ukraine

Commanders and leaders
(Russia) Vladimir Putin	(Ukraine) Volodymyr Zelenskyy

Strength
38,000+ soldiers (late March 2022); 50,000–62,000 soldiers (early April 2022); 10,000–20,000 mercenaries (per European officials, early April 2022); 300–500 Syrian and Libyan mercenaries (per ISW, early April 2022); 180,000 soldiers (per Ukraine, July 2023)	125,000 soldiers (in eastern Ukraine); 40,000–50,000 (as of the start of the battle of Donbas)

Ukraine's easternmost regions, Donetsk, Luhansk, and Kharkiv, have been the site of an ongoing theatre of operation since the start of the Russo-Ukrainian war in February 2022.

The battle of Donbas was a major offensive in the eastern theatre that took place in mid-2022. By the culmination of the offensive in July 2022, Russian forces and their separatist allies had captured the cities of Sievierodonetsk, Lysychansk, Rubizhne and Izium. However, in early September, Ukraine launched a major counteroffensive in the east, which recaptured the cities of Izium, Balakliia, Kupiansk, Sviatohirsk and the strategic city of Lyman. The counteroffensive stalled east of the Oskil river, and a campaign in eastern Kharkiv Oblast and western Luhansk Oblast has continued since, though Donetsk Oblast has remained the most active area of the frontline.

In the winter of 2022–2023, Russia focused on capturing the city of Bakhmut, largely destroying the city in one of the bloodiest battles of the war, and fully capturing it in May 2023. In June 2023, Ukraine launched another major counteroffensive across the entire frontline, capturing some Russian positions along Bakhmut's outskirts and in southwestern Donetsk Oblast, though not making the major gains in the Donbas which had been sought. By November 2023, this counteroffensive had largely stalled in the east and Russia began making new offensive operations to capture territory, gaining control of Avdiivka and Marinka in Donetsk Oblast by February 2024.

Following the capture of Avdiivka, Russian forces advanced to form a salient northwest of it and captured the settlement of Ocheretyne in April 2024 and began contesting Krasnohorivka, southwest of Donetsk, and Chasiv Yar, west of Bakhmut, and launched an offensive towards the city of Toretsk in June 2024. In late July 2024, Russia increased offensive manoeuvres in the direction of the strategically important city of Pokrovsk, capturing it in late January 2026.

== Background ==
Sporadic fighting had been taking place since 2014 between Ukrainian forces and Russian-backed separatists from the Donetsk People's Republic during the war in Donbas.

== Campaign ==
=== Initial Russian attacks (February–March 2022) ===
==== Kharkiv Oblast ====
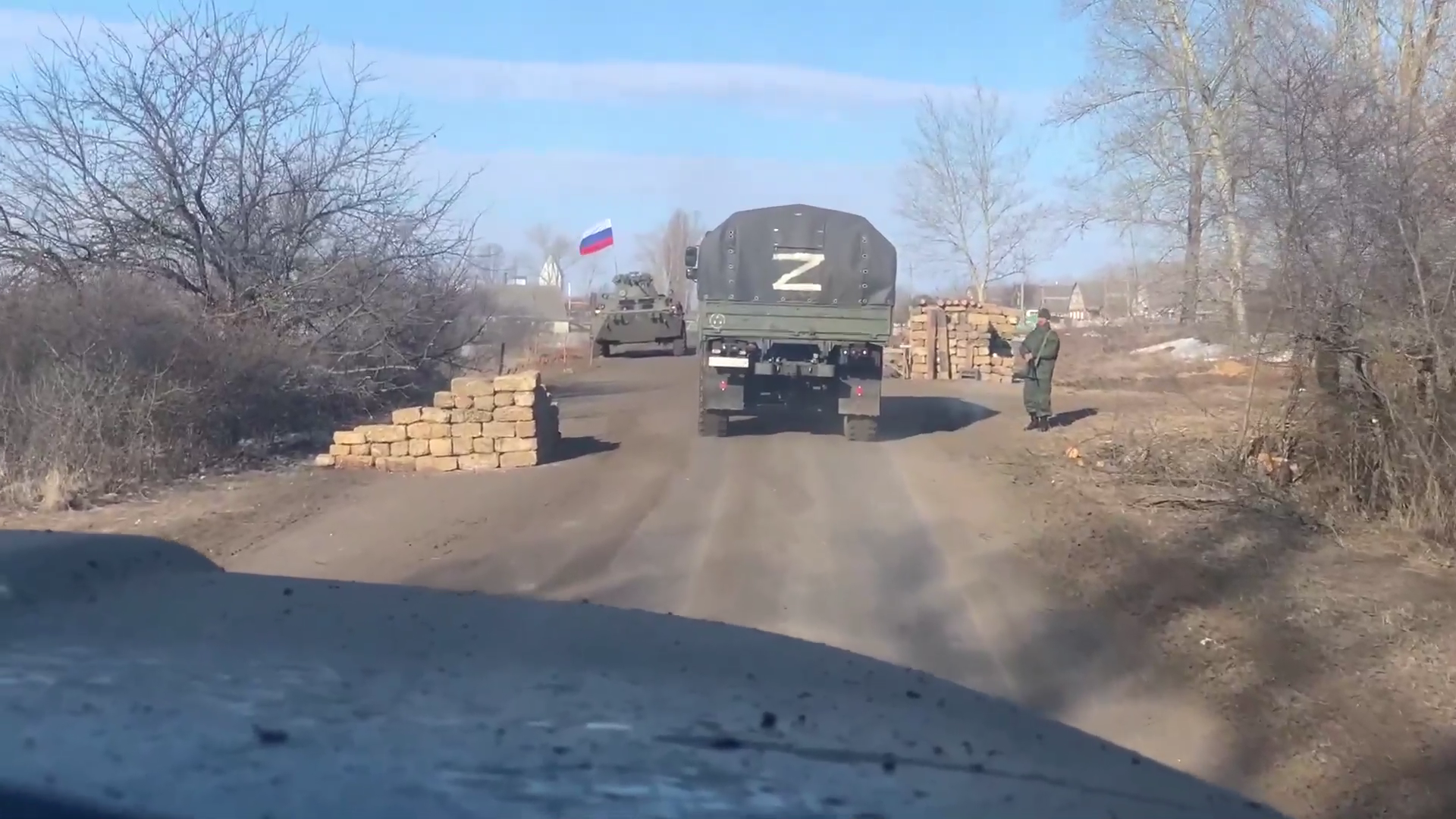
A Russian supply convoy in the Kharkiv region, March 2022

On 24 February, after Russian President Vladimir Putin announced a "special military operation" in Ukraine, Russian forces crossed the Russia-Ukraine border and began advancing towards Kharkiv. Ukrainian soldiers were deployed to positions along key routes into the city, and residents began volunteering for military service within hours of the invasion. A Russian missile struck the Chuhuiv air base, which housed Bayraktar TB2 drones. According to open-source intelligence, the attack left damage to fuel storage areas and infrastructure.

On 25 February, fierce fighting continued in the northern outskirts of Kharkiv, especially in the village of Tsyrkuny. On 26 February, the governor of Kharkiv Oblast, Oleh Syniehubov, stated that the city of Kharkiv was still under Ukrainian control, and announced a curfew for the city.

In the early morning of 27 February, a gas pipeline in Kharkiv was destroyed by Russian forces. Russian light vehicles broke into the city, with half of them reportedly destroyed by Ukrainian forces in ensuing fighting. By the afternoon, Ukrainian officials stated that Kharkiv was still under Ukrainian control despite the overnight attack by Russian forces. Meanwhile, Hennadiy Matsegora, the mayor of Kupiansk, agreed to hand over control of the city to Russian forces who were threatening to storm it, and accused Ukrainian forces of abandoning it when the invasion began. He was later accused of treason by the Ukrainian Prosecutor General Iryna Venediktova.

On 2 March, Russian paratroopers landed in Kharkiv during the early morning and started clashing with Ukrainian forces. Clashes also took place near a military hospital of the city as Russian paratroopers descended on it. Kharkiv Oblast's Police Chief Volodymyr Tymoshko later stated that the situation was under control. Russian forces entered the town of Balakliia the same day.

On 4 March, Ukrainian forces launched a counterattack in Kharkiv Oblast, reportedly pushing the Russian forces towards the Sumy Oblast, and reaching part of the Russia-Ukraine border. By 7 March, Ukraine claimed to have retaken Chuhuiv near Kharkiv in a counter-attack overnight. During the day, Ukraine also claimed to have killed Russian Maj. Gen. Vitaly Gerasimov, while also killing and wounding other senior Russian Army officers during a battle near Kharkiv.

On 8 March, Ukraine stated that it had repelled an attack by Russian forces on Izium.

==== Donetsk Oblast ====
On the morning of 25 February, Russian forces, along with allied separatists, advanced from territory controlled by the Donetsk People's Republic (DPR) towards Mariupol, encountering Ukrainian forces in Pavlopil. The Ukrainians were victorious, destroying at least 20 Russian tanks. In the evening, the Russian Navy began an amphibious assault 70 kilometres (43 miles) from Mariupol, along the coast of the Sea of Azov. Russian forces bombarded Mariupol throughout 26 February; the city's mayor Vadym Boychenko claimed that schools and apartment buildings had been struck.

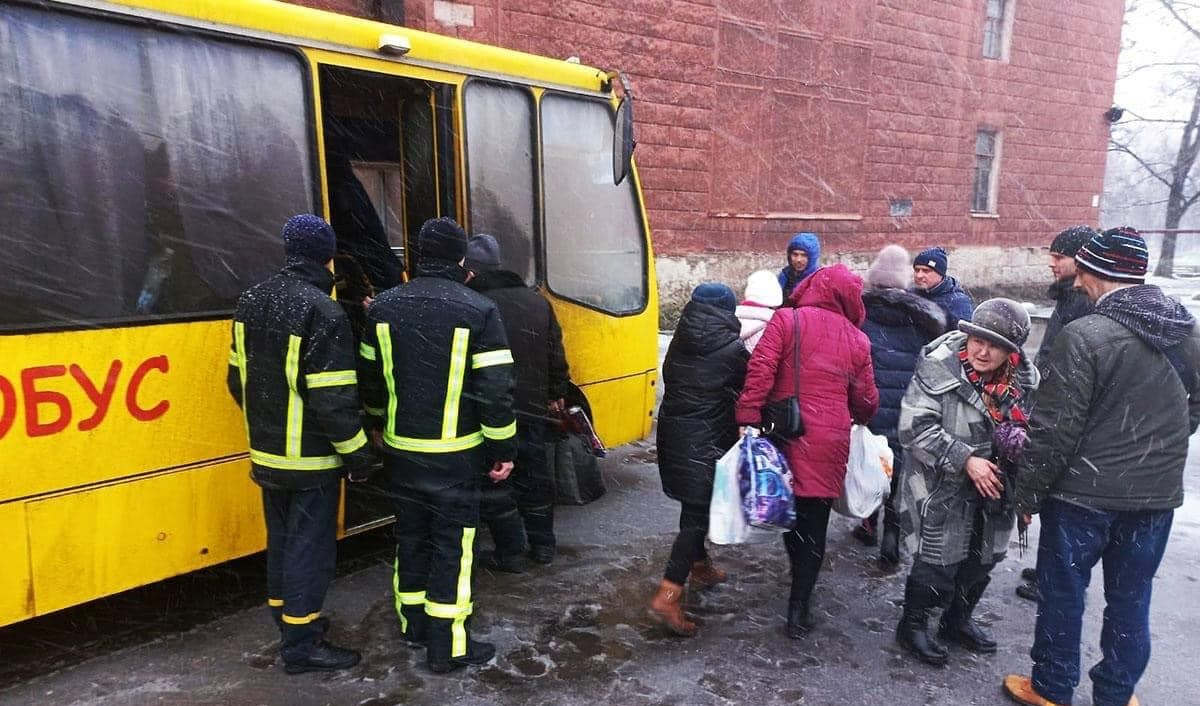
Ukrainian civilians being evacuated from Volnovakha in the Donetsk region

On the morning of 27 February, it was reported that a Russian tank column was quickly advancing towards Mariupol from DPR-held territory, but the attack was prevented by Ukrainian forces. Six Russian soldiers were captured.

The same day, Donetsk Oblast governor Pavlo Kyrylenko said that Volnovakha was undergoing a humanitarian crisis, as Russian shelling had practically destroyed the entire city.

On 1 March, Ukrainian forces began a counteroffensive toward Horlivka, which had been controlled by the DPR since 2014.

On 2 March, separatist-held Donetsk had been under shelling for several days. Some neighbourhoods had no electricity supply and there were burnt cars on the streets.

Ukrainian official Oleksiy Arestovych stated that the Ukrainian forces went on the offensive for the first time during the war, advancing towards Horlivka. Ihor Zhdanov later claimed that "there were reports" that a part of the city had been captured by Ukrainian forces. According to Ukrainian reports, Ukraine's 95th Air Assault Brigade had begun attacking the city the previous day.

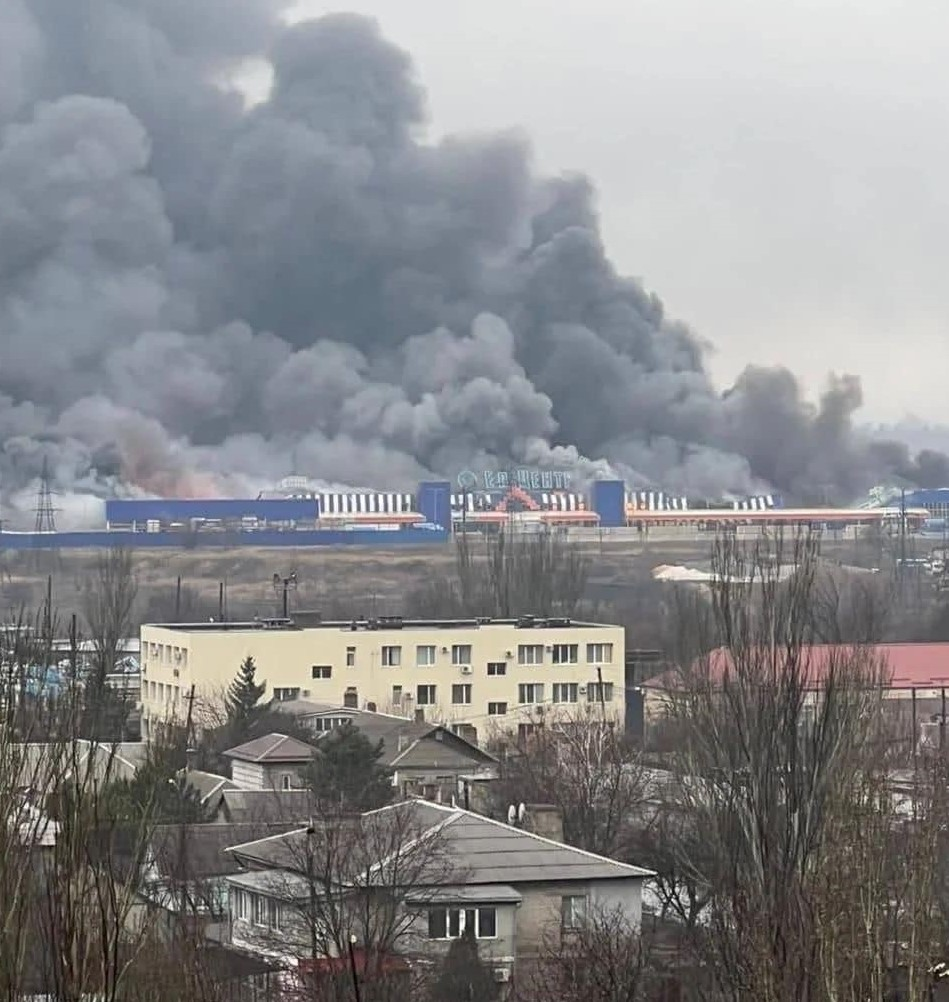
An Epicentr K ablaze amid Russian bombing in Mariupol.

Ukrainian authorities stated on 3 March that 34 civilians had been killed in Russian shelling in Mariupol in the previous 24 hours.

On 5 March, a ceasefire was declared in Volnovakha to allow civilians to evacuate, but was later scuttled with Ukrainian officials blaming Russian shelling continuing during the evacuation process. They added that about 400 civilians were still able to leave the city. Russian President Vladimir Putin however blamed Ukrainian forces for the breakdown of the ceasefire agreement.

On 6 March, both sides blamed each other for the failure of a second attempt to evacuate civilians from Mariupol.

On 9 March, a building acting as a maternity ward and children's hospital in Mariupol was bombed by the Russian Air Force at around 17:00, killing five civilians and injuring 17.

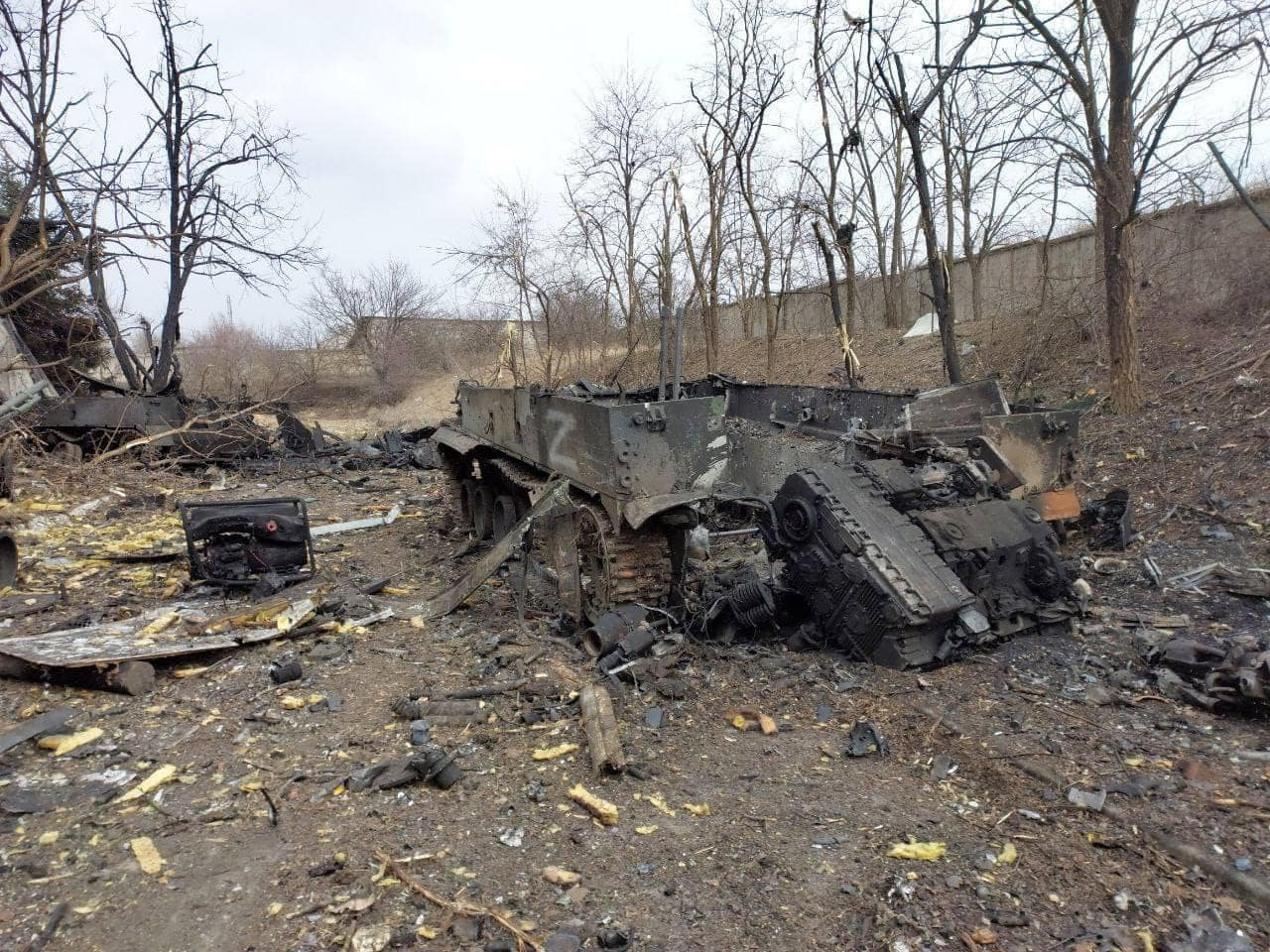
Destroyed Russian tanks in Mariupol, 7 March 2022

On 11 March, the Russian Defence Ministry stated that the forces of the DPR had captured Volnovakha. It also claimed that they had advanced 6 kilometres (3.7 mi) and had further tightened the siege of Mariupol. Videos later posted on social media showed Russian forces in many neighbourhoods of Volnovakha.

On 12 March, the Associated Press independently confirmed that Volnovakha had been captured by pro-Russian separatists and much of it had been destroyed in the fighting. Pavlo Kyrylenko, the governor of Donetsk Oblast, stated that while the settlements of Nikolske, Manhush and Urzuf had been occupied by Russian troops, they had yet to capture any key cities, with the exception of Volnovakha.

In the northern Donetsk Oblast, the Sviatohirsk Lavra monastery was bombed around 22:00 on 12 March, wounding 30 people and damaging the monastery.

The Russian Defence Ministry stated on 13 March that Russian forces had captured the settlements of Nikolske, Blahodatne, Volodymyrivka and Pavlivka in Donetsk Oblast, in an attempt to reach Velyka Novosilka. The Ukrainian military stated that Russian forces had captured the settlements of Staromlynivka, Yevhenivka, Pavlivka and Yehorivka during the day.

On 14 March, Donetsk was hit by a missile attack. Denis Pushilin, the head of the Donetsk People's Republic, stated that they had shot down a Ukrainian Tochka-U missile fired on the city of Donetsk, but parts of the missile fell into the city centre, killing multiple civilians. The Russian Defense Ministry stated that 23 civilians were killed and 28 more wounded. However, the Ukrainian military denied conducting the attack and stated that it was "unmistakably a Russian rocket or another munition", which was supported by an assessment of the Conflict Intelligence Team, an investigative journalism group.

Ukrainian forces later said that Russian troops of the 336th Guards Naval Infantry Brigade and the 11th Guards Air Assault Brigade had tried to advance in the Donetsk Oblast at 17:00, but were repulsed with up to 100 soldiers killed and six of their vehicles being destroyed.

On 20 March, Russian officials confirmed that Andrey Paliy, a deputy commander of the Black Sea Fleet, had been killed in Mariupol.

==== Luhansk Oblast ====
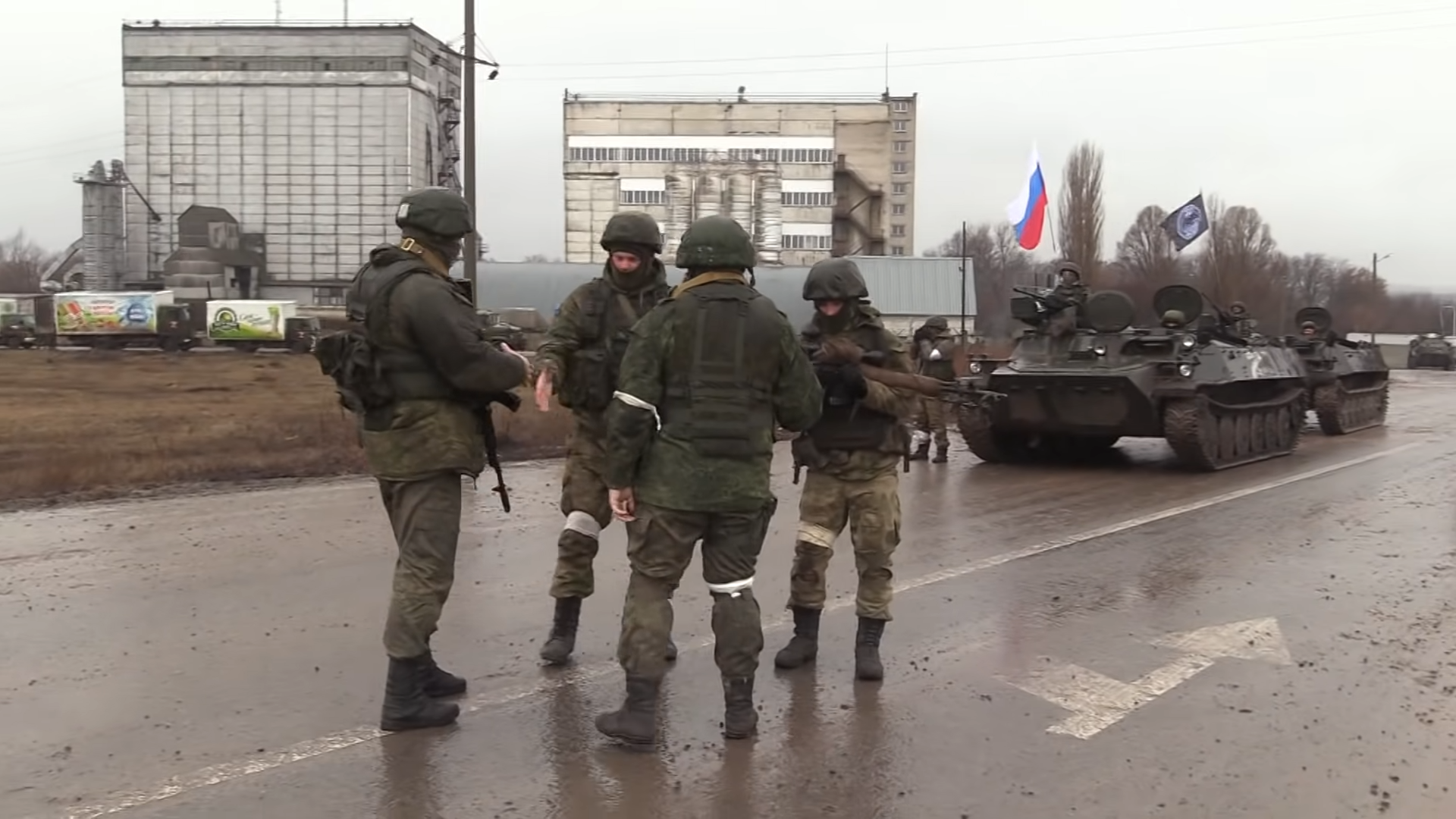
Russian and LPR units convene in Novoaidar, March 2022

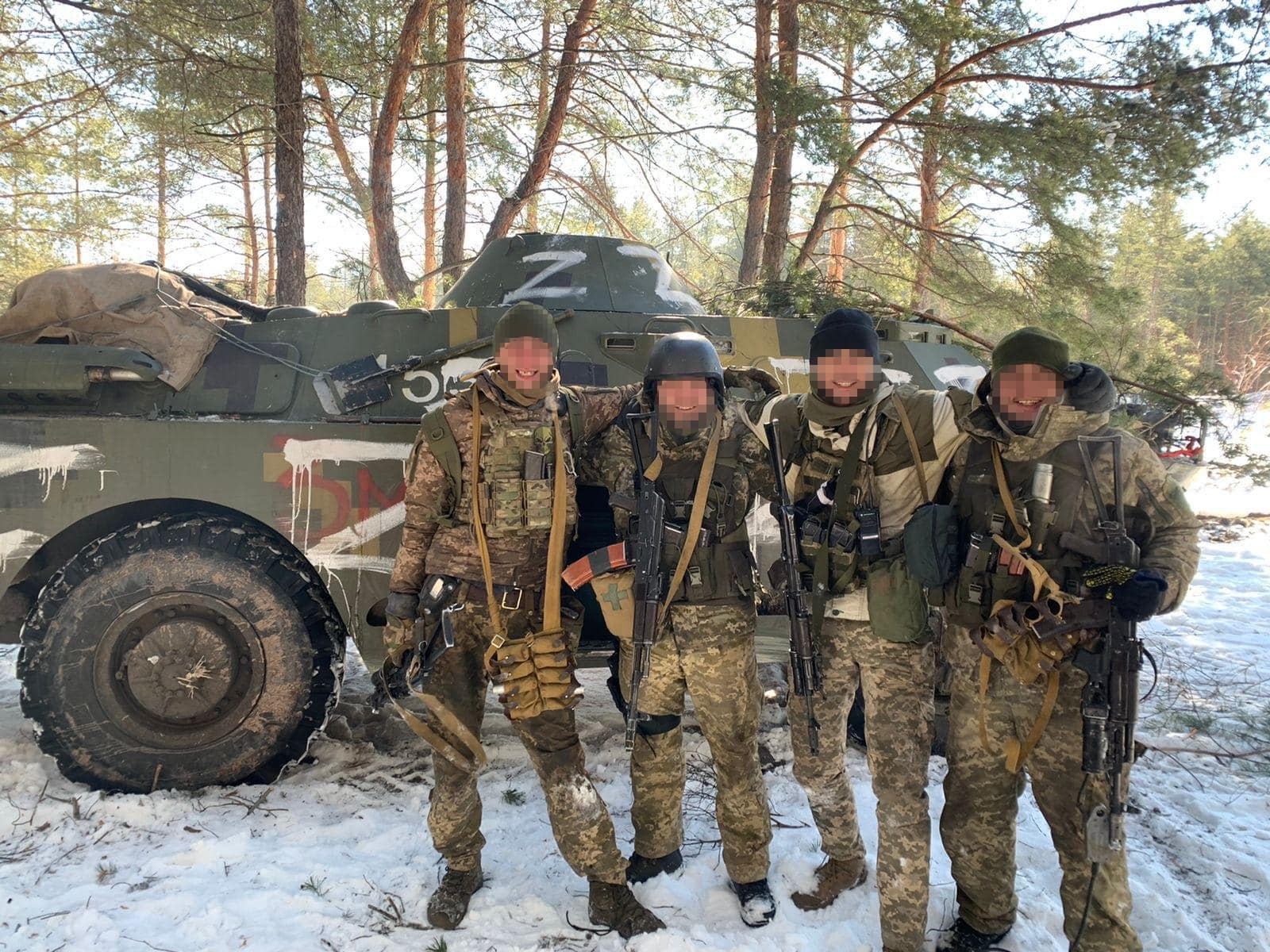
Ukrainian soldiers with a captured Russian BRDM, March 2022

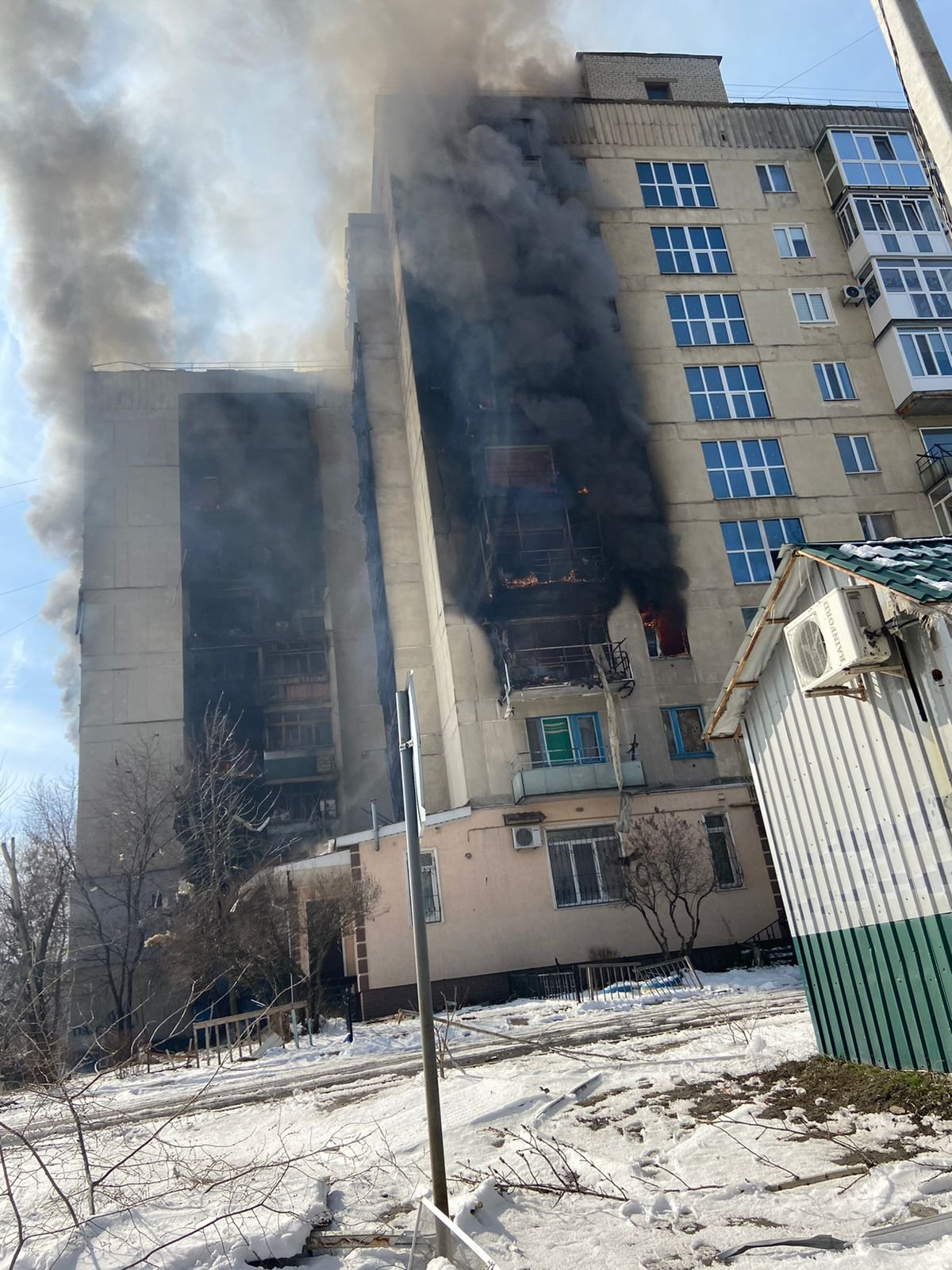
Burning buildings in Sievierodonetsk after Russian shelling, 13 March

On 24 February, the Ukrainian military said that Russian forces were attempting to cross the Siverskyi Donets River and penetrate the Ukrainian defensive line amid heavy clashes for Shchastia and Stanytsia Luhanska. By 27 February, Luhansk Oblast governor Serhiy Haidai acknowledged that February that both cities had come under Russian occupation, and had been practically destroyed by Russian shelling.

On 25 February, the Ukrainian military claimed that its artillery had inflicted damage on a Russian column preparing to cross the Aidar River near Starobilsk, forcing the Russians to withdraw.

On 2 March, forces of the Luhansk People's Republic and Russian troops captured Novoaidar, taking over a base of Ukraine's 79th Brigade. Further north, a Russian convoy of 60 vehicles entered Starobilsk through the fields near the villages of Shulhynka, Omelkove, and Khvorostianivka. Inside the city, the Russians were confronted by protesting locals waving Ukrainian flags and singing the Ukrainian national anthem. The column continued in the direction of Svatove.

The next day, civilians carrying Ukrainian flags protested against Russian troops in Svatove. After talks with locals, the soldiers withdrew from the town. Also on 3 March, LPR officials announced that in addition to Novoaidar and Starobilsk, their forces had taken control of Stepnyi Yar, Havrylivka, Yepifanivka and Krasnorichenske, all located on the outskirts of Sievierodonetsk. The Russian ministry of defence claimed that LPR forces had reached the northern outskirts of Sievierodonetsk on the same date.

Haidai stated on 6 March that fighting was taking place on the outskirts of Lysychansk, Sievierodonetsk and Rubizhne, as Ukrainian units had fallen back to a new front line to avoid encirclement or a Russian breakthrough. He added that Ukrainian forces had lost control of Svatove, Starobilsk and Novopskov, though Russian forces were not deployed in the cities in large numbers. He also said that Popasna and Hirske were being continuously shelled.

On 8 March, Ukrainian officials stated that ten civilians had been killed and eight wounded in shelling on Severodonetsk during the day. Haidai, meanwhile, stated that Russian forces had occupied 70 per cent of Luhansk Oblast.

On 12 March, Ukrainian forces confirmed the death of Colonel Valery Hudz, the commander of the Ukrainian 24th Mechanized Brigade, while fighting on the Luhansk frontline. Ukrainian officials accused Russia of using white phosphorus munitions on the town of Popasna, located in the Luhansk Oblast, during the night of 12–13 March.

On 15 March, Haidai stated that four civilians were killed due to Russian shelling of a hospital, a care facility for children with visual impairments, and three schools in Rubizhne.

On 22 March, the head of the LPR, Leonid Pasechnik, claimed that "almost 80% of the territory" of the Luhansk region was under separatist control, with Popasna, Lysychansk, Rubizhne, Severodonetsk and Kreminna remaining Ukrainian-held. He noted that the situation in the battlefield was "stably tense" and that units of the People's Militia of the LPR were striving to capture Popasna and Rubizhne.

=== Battle of Donbas (April–September 2022) ===
==== April 2022 ====
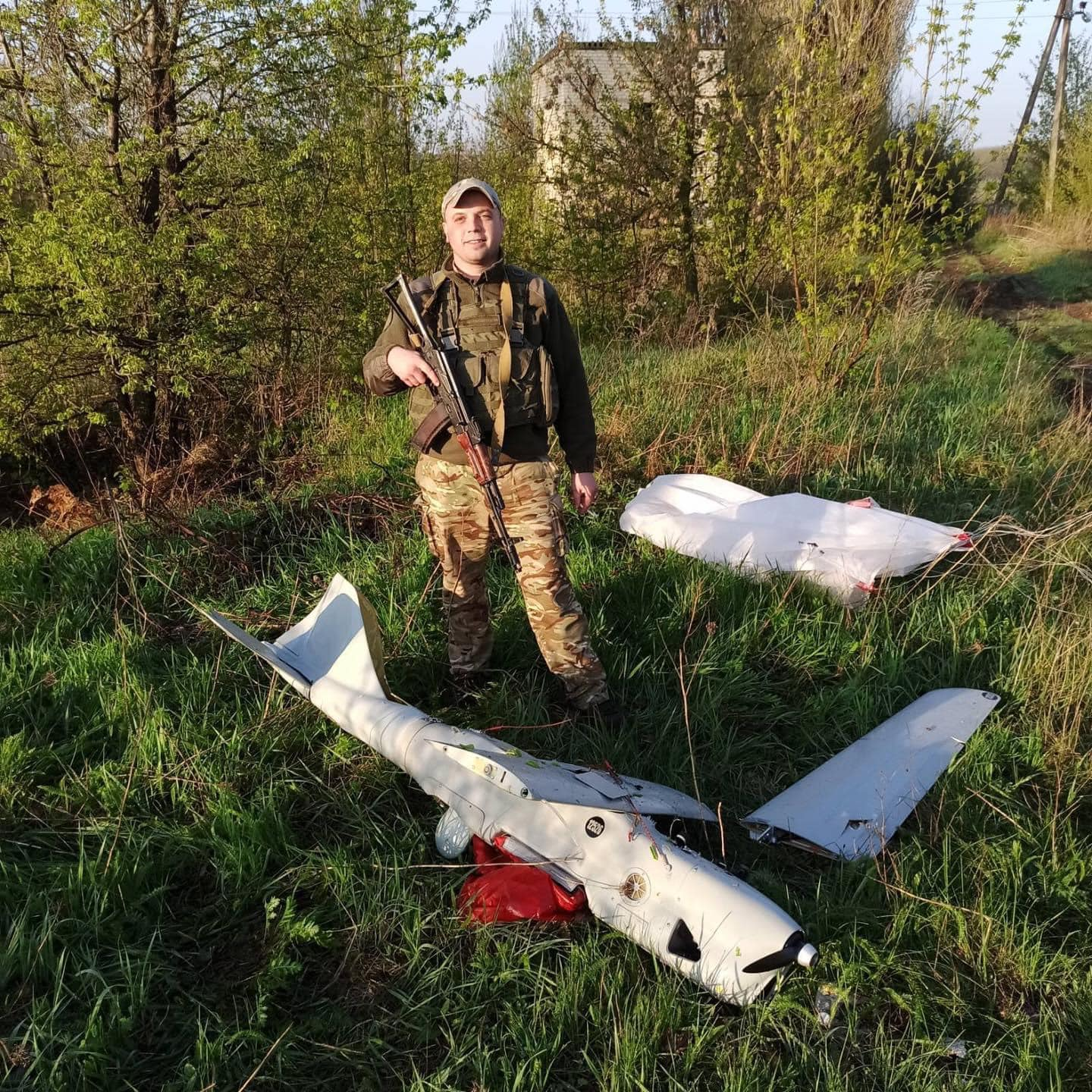
A Russian Orlan-10 drone shot down by the National Guard of Ukraine in Luhansk Oblast, April 2022

On 25 March, the Russian defence ministry stated that it was prepared to begin a second phase of military operations with the aim of occupying major Ukrainian cities in eastern Ukraine. According to the ministry, Russian-backed separatists were in control of 93% of Luhansk Oblast and 54% of Donetsk Oblast.

After Russia abandoned its offensive to capture Kyiv, it shifted its attention to eastern and southern Ukraine. The Russian military began redeploying units from northern Ukraine to the east, but many of these troops appeared to be nearly combat-ineffective due to heavy losses. However, Russia still amassed tens of thousands of troops, declaring its aim to fully capture the Donetsk and Luhansk Oblasts. It managed to secure Izium on 1 April, although heavy fighting continued around the settlement over the next few days. According to local authorities 80% of Izium's residential buildings were destroyed in the battle. On 3 April, according to the Ukrainian government, two Russian soldiers died and 28 others were hospitalised after Ukrainian civilians handed out poisoned cakes to soldiers of the Russian 3rd Motor Rifle Division in Izium.

Russia and the pro-Russian separatists continued to besiege Mariupol, where they made little progress. However, Russian troops managed to divide the Ukrainian holdouts in Mariupol into two or three pockets on 10 April. At the same time, Russia made concentrated efforts to conquer the strategically important cities of Sievierodonetsk, Popasna, and Rubizhne. It launched repeated attacks on these locations from 10 April. Russia made little progress in these attacks, and Ukraine claimed that it had inflicted a heavy defeat on the Russian 60th Independent Motorised Infantry Brigade on 11 April. In nearby Kreminna, Ukraine's 128th Brigade claimed to have pushed Russian forces 6–10 kilometres away from the city.

To support the operations aimed at Sievierodonetsk, Popasna, and Rubizhne, Russia made a push south of Izium toward Barvinkove and Sloviansk. Ukraine responded by shifting more units to hold off the Russians at Izium. At the same time, Russia attacked around Kharkiv to pin down local Ukrainian forces. Russia had made only limited gains at Izium by 12 April, but more Russian forces continued to arrive, to reinforce the offensive.

On 13 April, it was reported that Russia was attempting to assemble a force large enough to outnumber the Ukrainian soldiers in eastern Ukraine by five times, in an attempt to finally win a decisive victory in the Donbas. On 16 April, Russia warned the remaining defenders of Mariupol to surrender; the Ukrainians ignored the demand. On 18 April, Ukraine launched counter-attacks, and retook several small towns and villages near Kharkiv and Izium.

Also on 18 April, Zelenskyy announced that the "battle for Donbas" had begun, as Russian forces launched an offensive across a 300-mile front. According to Russian officials, 1,260 military targets were hit by rockets and artillery. The initial Russian bombardment focused on Rubizhne, Popasna, and Marinka.

On the same day, it was reported that Russian and LNR troops had entered the city of Kreminna, capturing it after a few hours of clashes with the Ukrainian Army. LNR commander Mikhail Kishchik was killed in this battle. Over the next days, Russia gained little territory despite attacks all across the frontline. Facing heavy Ukrainian resistance, the Russian and separatist forces were able to advance into parts of Rubizhne, Popasna, and Sievierodonetsk. Some reports also suggested that fighting in Kreminna was still ongoing. On 21 April, the Russians claimed to have killed over 4,000 Ukrainian troops in Mariupol, and to have captured a further 1,478. By 23 April, Ukrainian counter-attacks had reportedly further stalled the Russian advance.

In the following days, Russia continued its attempts to break through the Ukrainian defences, possibly in an aim to encircle the Izium-Donetsk City salient. Fighting was concentrated at Sievierodonetsk, Rubizhne, Popasna, Marinka, Kharkiv, and Izium. Russia, the LPR, and the DPR made limited gains, capturing a number of villages and the towns of Popivka, Pischane, Zhytlivka, and Kreminna. However, their overall advance was slow, and stalled in most areas of the frontline. Ukraine also mounted a growing number of counter-attacks at Izium and Kharkiv, gradually expelling Russian forces from a number of settlements.

==== First Ukrainian Kharkiv counteroffensive and the recapture of Mariupol and Sievierodonetsk (May–September 2022) ====
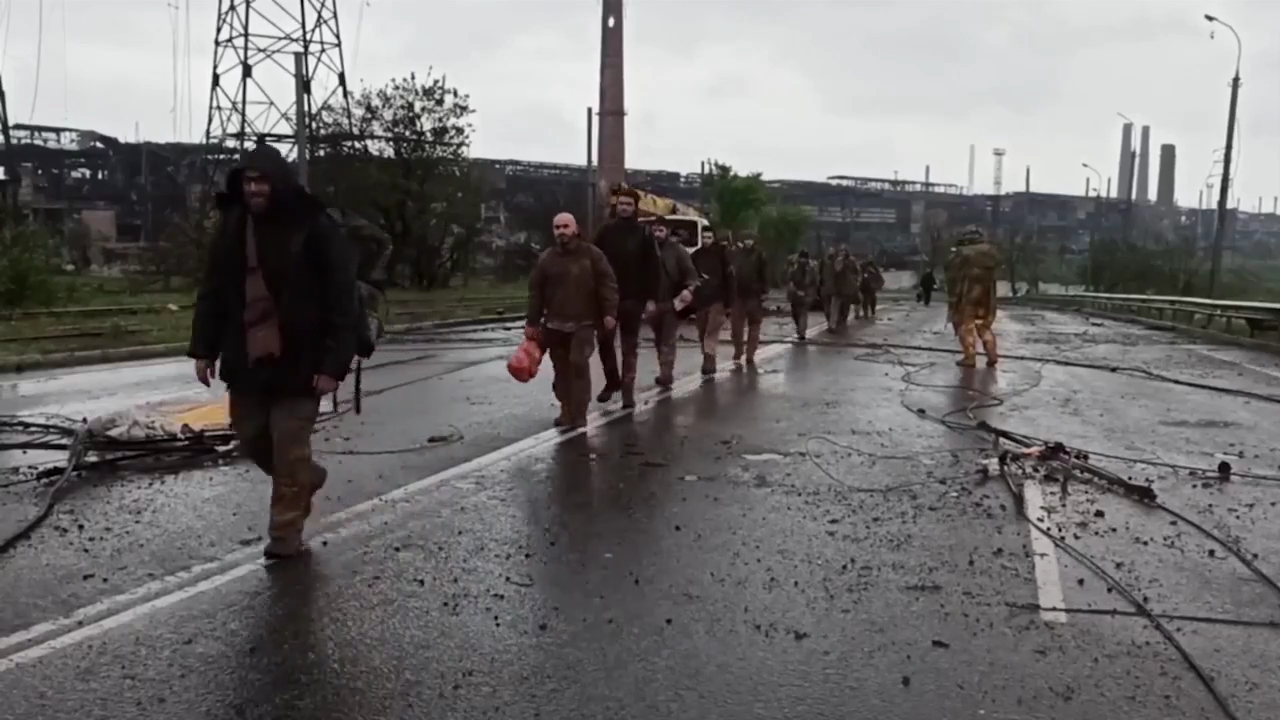
Ukrainian troops surrender after the capture of Azovstal in Mariupol, 19 May 2022

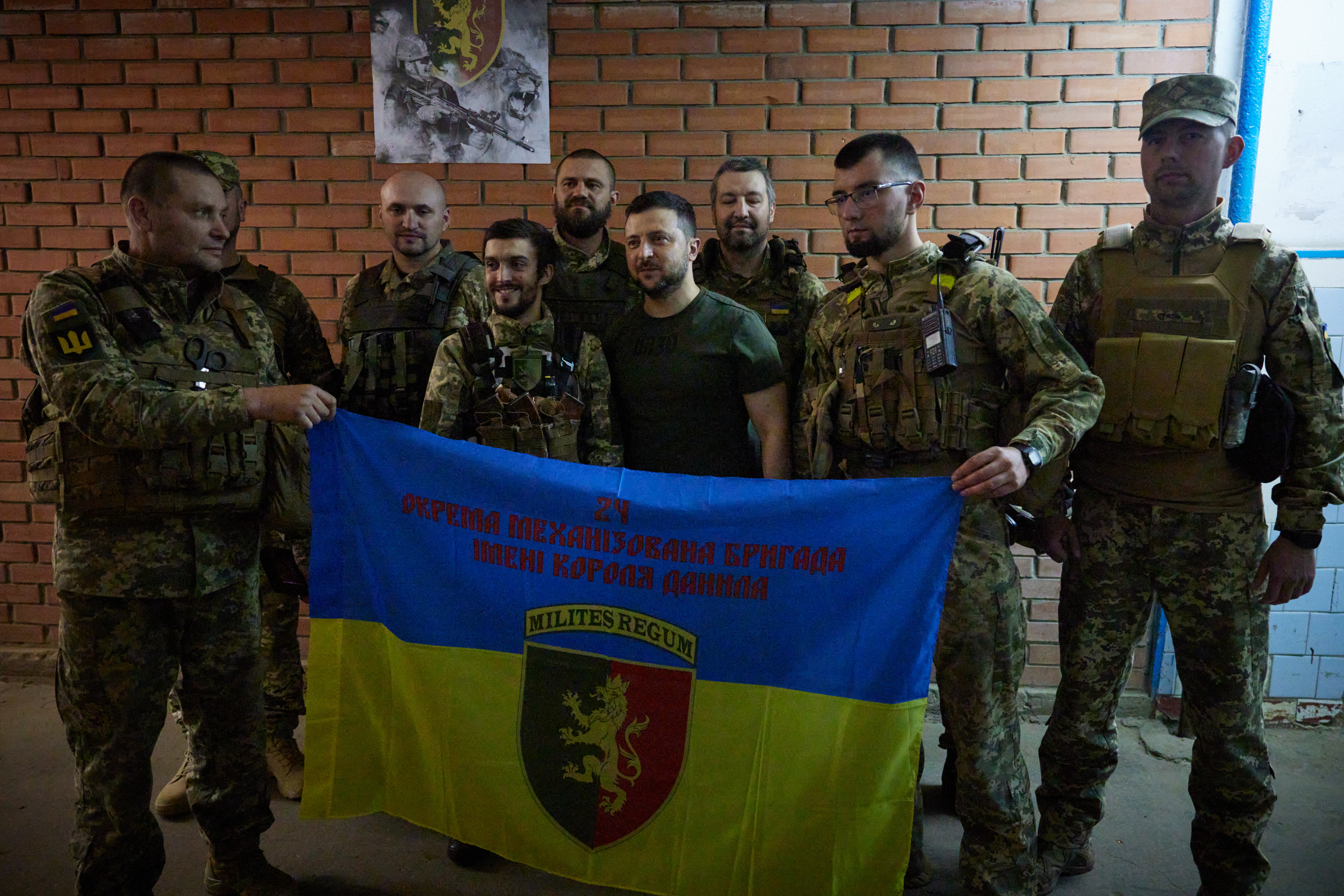
President Volodymyr Zelenskyy visiting the 24th Mechanized Brigade on the eastern front, near Bakhmut and Lysychansk, 5 June 2022

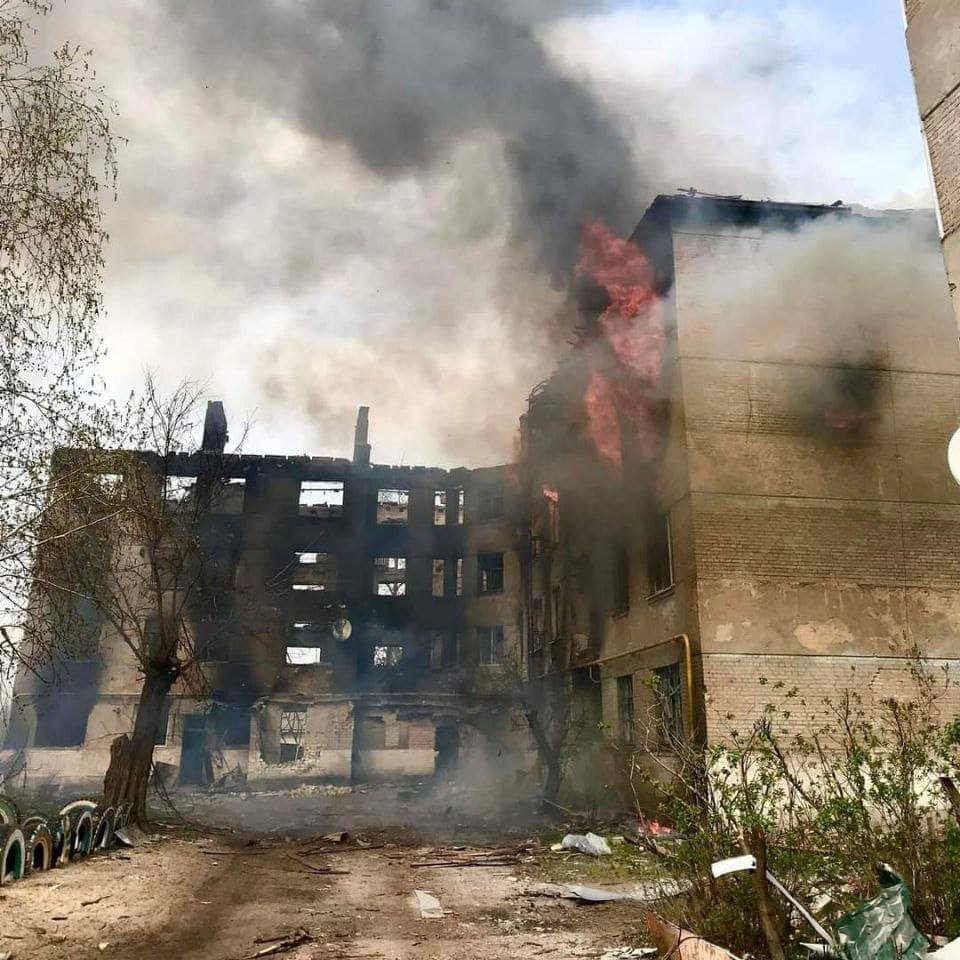
Burning buildings in Luhansk Oblast after Russian shelling, 13 June 2022

On 30 April, Ukraine launched a large-scale counter-offensive at Kharkiv, retaking the city's suburbs and several more towns over the following days.

By 4 May, Russian forces had been pushed back to such a distance that most of their artillery could no longer strike Kharkiv. Meanwhile, Russian and DPR/LPR separatist forces continued to attempt to break through Ukrainian defences at Izium and the Donetsk-Luhansk frontline. On 6 May, the ISW described a Ukrainian counteroffensive "along a broad arc" near Kharkiv, reporting that Ukraine had recaptured "several villages," including Tsyrkuny, Peremoha and part of Cherkaski Tyshky. The ISW also reported that Ukraine "may successfully push Russian forces out of artillery range in Kharkiv in the coming days."

On 7 May, Russian forces destroyed several bridges in an attempt to slow down the Ukrainian counter-offensive at Kharkiv. On the same day, Russia and separatist troops also captured Popasna. Following the capture of Popasna, Russia began attempting to encircle Sievierodonetsk.

On 7 May, it was reported that Ukrainian forces had successfully pushed back Russian forces stationed around Kharkiv, with the city getting further out of range for Russian forces. The same day, Ukrainian forces also reported retaking five villages northeast of Kharkiv. Quoting a Ukrainian official, The New York Times said that the battle for Kharkiv was not over, but that at the moment, Ukraine was dominating, and that Russian troops were destroying bridges as they were retreating. On 11 May, Ukrainian forces claimed to have recaptured four settlements. The counteroffensive had the potential to bring Ukrainian forces within several kilometres of the Russian border.

On 10 May, Ukraine made further gains on the Kharkiv front, forcing Russia to redeploy forces from the Izium front to the north.

In addition, Ukrainian artillery destroyed an entire Russian battalion tactical group attempting a river crossing in the battle of the Siverskyi Donets. Meanwhile, Russia and the DPR attempted to cement their occupation in eastern Ukraine through political and economic means, likely in an attempt to integrate these areas into the existing separatist republics or establish new ones. On the other side, Ukrainian civilians began organising resistance movements. As Ukrainian forces retook territory around Kharkiv, local civilian collaborators fled to Russia.

On 12 May, Russian forces seized Rubizhne and the nearby town of Voevodivka. Heavy fighting subsequently took place at the village of Dovhenke south of Izium. On 13 May, it was reported that Russia had decided to withdraw its forces from Kharkiv Oblast. On 14 May, the ISW reported that "Ukraine thus appears to have won the battle of Kharkiv." The Mayor of Kharkiv said to the BBC: "There was no shelling in the city for the last five days. There was only one attempt from Russians to hit the city with a missile rocket near Kharkiv airport, but the missile was eliminated by Ukrainian Air Defence."

Russia continued its attempts to encircle Sievierodonetsk and began to focus on cutting the highway at Bakhmut. By 14 May, the Ukrainians claimed to have killed over 6,000 Russian soldiers in Mariupol. They also claimed to have destroyed 78 tanks and 100 other armoured vehicles. On 15 May, Ukrainian forces reached the border near Kharkiv, while continuing to push back Russian and LPR units. On the following day, the siege of Mariupol was formally concluded as the Ukrainian military personnel in the city's Azovstal agreed to gradually evacuate and surrender to the Russian forces. Four days later, the Russians announced that they had taken an additional 2,439 Ukrainians prisoners in Mariupol, bringing the total number captured during the siege to 3,917. In addition, it was reported that unrest – including public protests – was growing among pro-Russian collaborators and separatists in eastern Ukraine, as they accused Russian forces of corruption, incompetence, and forced mobilisations.

Over the following days, Russia made little to no progress at the Izium frontline, but captured some territory around Popasna and Sievierodonetsk, increasingly threatening Sievierodonetsk and Lysychansk with encirclement. Russia also intensified air and artillery strikes targeting Ukrainian positions around Izium, possibly to prepare for renewed attacks. At the northern front, Russia and separatist forces retook a few villages and fortified their positions to stall the Ukrainian counter-offensive.

After the Ukrainian counteroffensive, Russian forces were driven back to defensive positions, some of which were within miles of the Russia-Ukraine international border. Despite this, they continued to shell various Kharkiv suburbs, as well as the city proper, killing numerous civilians and wounding dozens more. Skirmishes along the Russia–Ukraine border in the area of northeastern Ukraine continued between Russian and Ukrainian forces beyond 14 May.

On 20 May, Russian forces again shelled several villages in the Kharkiv district, including the city of Kharkiv itself, using BM-21 Grad, BM-27 Uragan and BM-30 Smerch multiple rocket launchers. On 21 May, the Ukrainian police confirmed the recovery of the bodies of six military officials, including a Russian colonel, in the settlement of Zolochiv.

On 22 May, the Russian forces made minimal progress in eastern Ukraine. New reports confirmed that Russian troops had occupied Rubizhne in the northern Kharkiv Oblast on 19 May. In northern Kharkiv, Russian forces brought in reinforcements to maintain their positions on the west bank of the Seversky Donets River, instead of retreating across the river to use it as a defensive position, to prevent further Ukrainian advances north or east that could jeopardize Russian communication lines along the Izium axis. On 24 May, Russian forces attempted to retake Ternova in northern Kharkiv Oblast.

On 23 May, Russian forces took control of Lyman and attacked Avdiivka. On 24 May, Russian forces attacked from Popasna with the aim of cutting off Bakhmut, Lysychansk and Sievierodonetsk, gaining some ground. Ukrainian forces made a controlled withdrawal southwest of Popasna to strengthen their defensive position at Bakhmut. Russia subsequently captured Svitlodarsk.

Around this time, Ukrainian defence adviser Yuriy Sak publicly demanded more multiple launch rocket systems to reinforce Ukrainian artillery capabilities. On 31 May, the United States announced a military aid package that included precision rocket systems with a range of 80 km.

After a fierce month-long battle that ruined much of the city, Russian and LPR forces captured Sievierodonetsk along the Siverskyi Donets river on 25 June. On the same day, the battle of Lysychansk began, which also saw a Russian victory on 2 July. The following day Russian and LPR forces declared full control of the entire Luhansk region. On 4 July, The Guardian reported that after the capture of the Luhansk oblast, that Russian invasion troops would continue their invasion into the adjacent Donetsk oblast to attack the cities of Sloviansk and Bakhmut. The Russian military declared an "operational pause" to rest and replenish front line forces in Luhansk. On 9 July, a Russian rocket attack on two residential buildings in Chasiv Yar killed at least 48 people.

On 25–26 July, after Russia's operational pause concluded, Russian sources reported that the towns of Berestove, Novoluhanske, and the nearby Vuhlehirska Power Station had been captured. The Institute for the Study of War (ISW) suggested Ukrainian defenders likely conducted a deliberate withdrawal from the area.

On 13 August, the Russian defence ministry said its forces had captured the village of Udy, northwest of Kharkiv.

The Deputy Chief of the Main Operational Directorate of Ukraine's General Staff, Oleksiy Hromov, alleged on 1 September that Russian president Vladimir Putin had ordered Russian forces to capture the entirety of Donetsk Oblast by 15 September via a renewed offensive. Hromov further alleged that Russia was going to rotate its recently established 3rd Army Corps to the Donetsk front. A senior US defence official dismissed the purported deployment of the "older, unfit, and ill-trained" 3rd Army Corps personnel as being unable to increase Russia's overall combat power in Ukraine.

=== Second Ukrainian Kharkiv counteroffensive (September–October 2022) ===
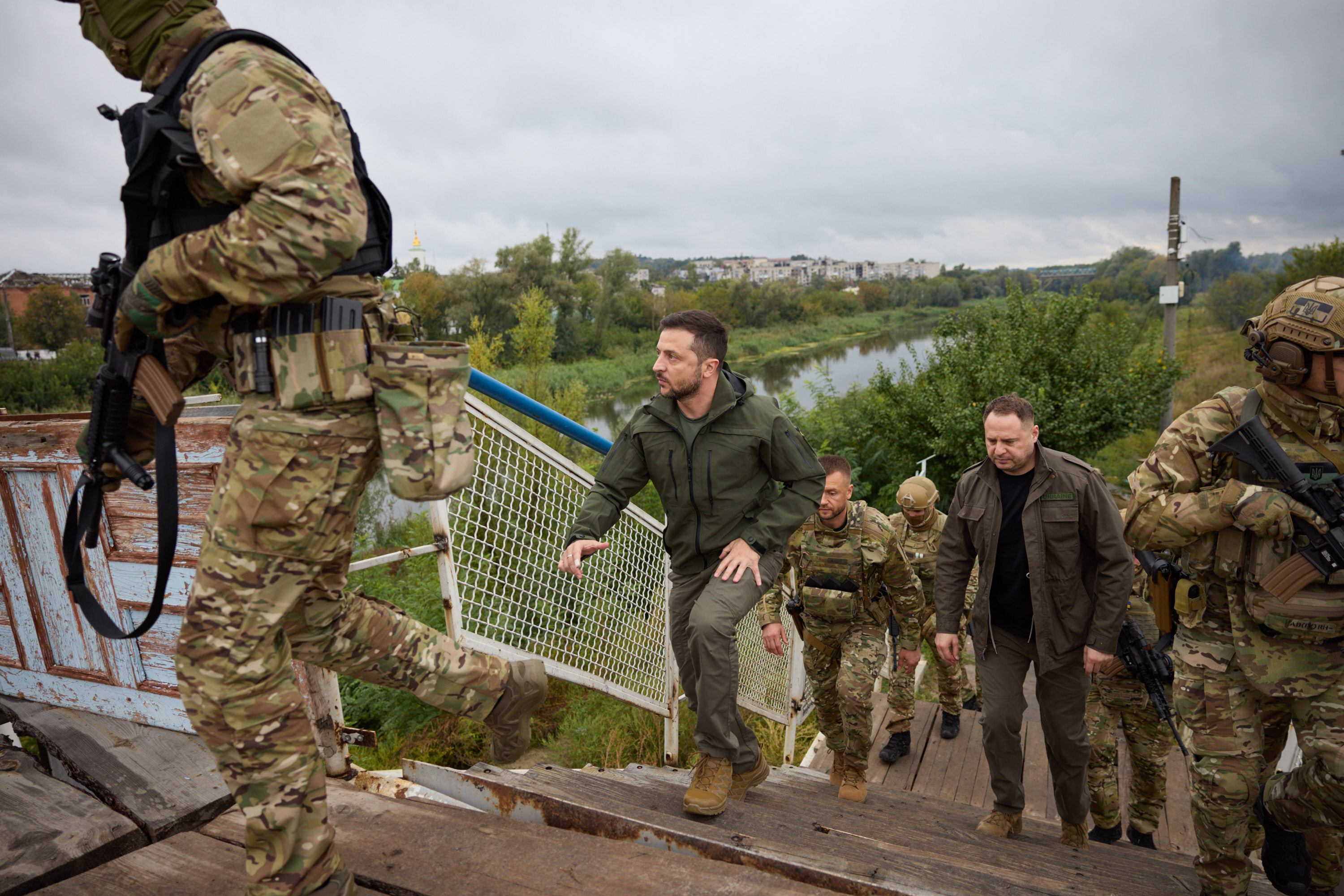
President Zelenskyy with Ukrainian soldiers near the frontline in Kharkiv Oblast, September 2022

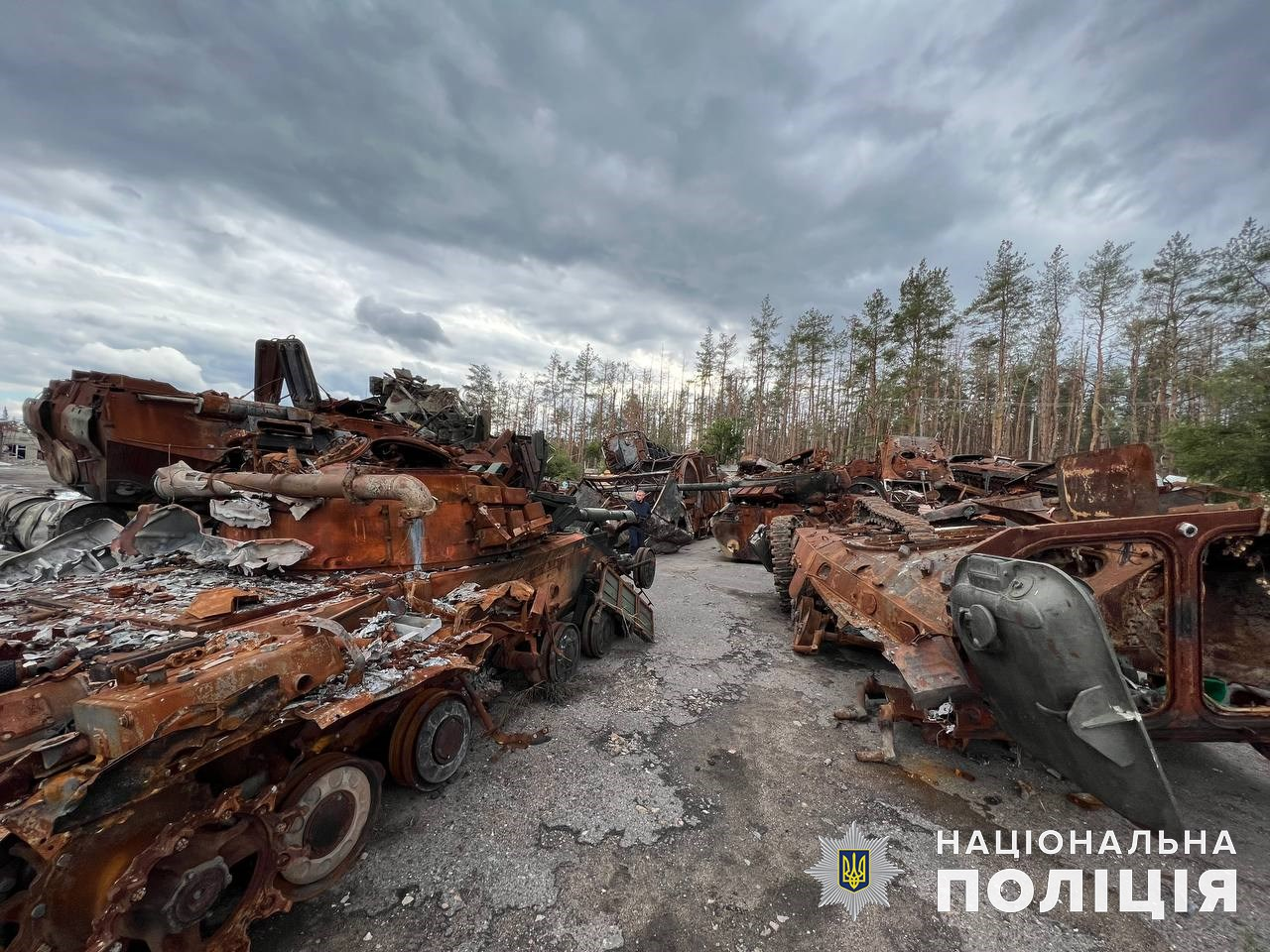
Destroyed Russian equipment from the battle of Lyman

On 6 September 2022, Ukrainian forces began a surprise counter-offensive on the Kharkiv front that resulted in Russian forces retreating over 1,000 square kilometres (390 sq mi) east. On 4 September, Zelenskyy announced the liberation of a village in Donetsk Oblast. Ukrainian authorities released a video of their forces entering Ozerne. On 8 September, Ukrainian forces recaptured more than 20 settlements in Kharkiv Oblast, including the towns of Balakliia and Shevchenkove and 'penetrated Russian defence positions up to 50 km' according to the General Staff of the Armed Forces of Ukraine. On the same day, a representative of the Russian occupation authorities announced that the 'defense of Kupiansk had begun' and that additional Russian forces were on their way to support the effort, suggesting that Ukrainian elements were close to the town.

On 9 September, Ukrainian forces reached the outskirts of Kupiansk and destroyed the main bridge over the Oskil river in the city centre, limiting the ability of the Russian Army to retreat or to bring in reinforcements. In the morning of 10 September, Ukrainian soldiers posted pictures of the Ukrainian flag being raised in front of the town hall. Also on 10 September, Izium, a central command post of the Russians in the region, fell to Ukrainian forces, "with thousands of Russian soldiers abandoning ammunition stockpiles and equipment as they fled." On 11 September, it was reported that the Ukrainians had retaken Velykyi Burluk in Kharkiv Oblast, just 15 miles (24 km) from the border with Russia. Russia responded with missile strikes on civilian areas and on non-military infrastructure facilities like power stations. The Russian Ministry of Defense then formally announced Russian forces' withdrawal from the majority of Kharkiv Oblast on 11 September, with Russia only controlling parts of the region on the east bank of the Oskil River.

By October 2022, Ukrainian forces had retaken several villages and towns in northern Luhansk and northern Donetsk, including Yatskivka, Novoliubivka, Nevske, Hrekivka, Novoiehorivka, Nadiya, Andriivka, and Stelmakhivka, among others. On 1 October, Ukrainian forces entered Lyman after a short siege. Russian forces had fallen back to the P-66 highway near the Kharkiv-Luhansk Oblast border, anchored by the settlements of Svatove and Kreminna, the first city to be taken during the battle of Donbas. On 2–3 October, Ukrainian forces began attacking towards Kreminna and Svatove in an attempt to break the Russian front line along the P-66 in northern Luhansk.

=== First Russian winter campaign (November 2022 – May 2023) ===
==== Early winter (November–December 2022) ====
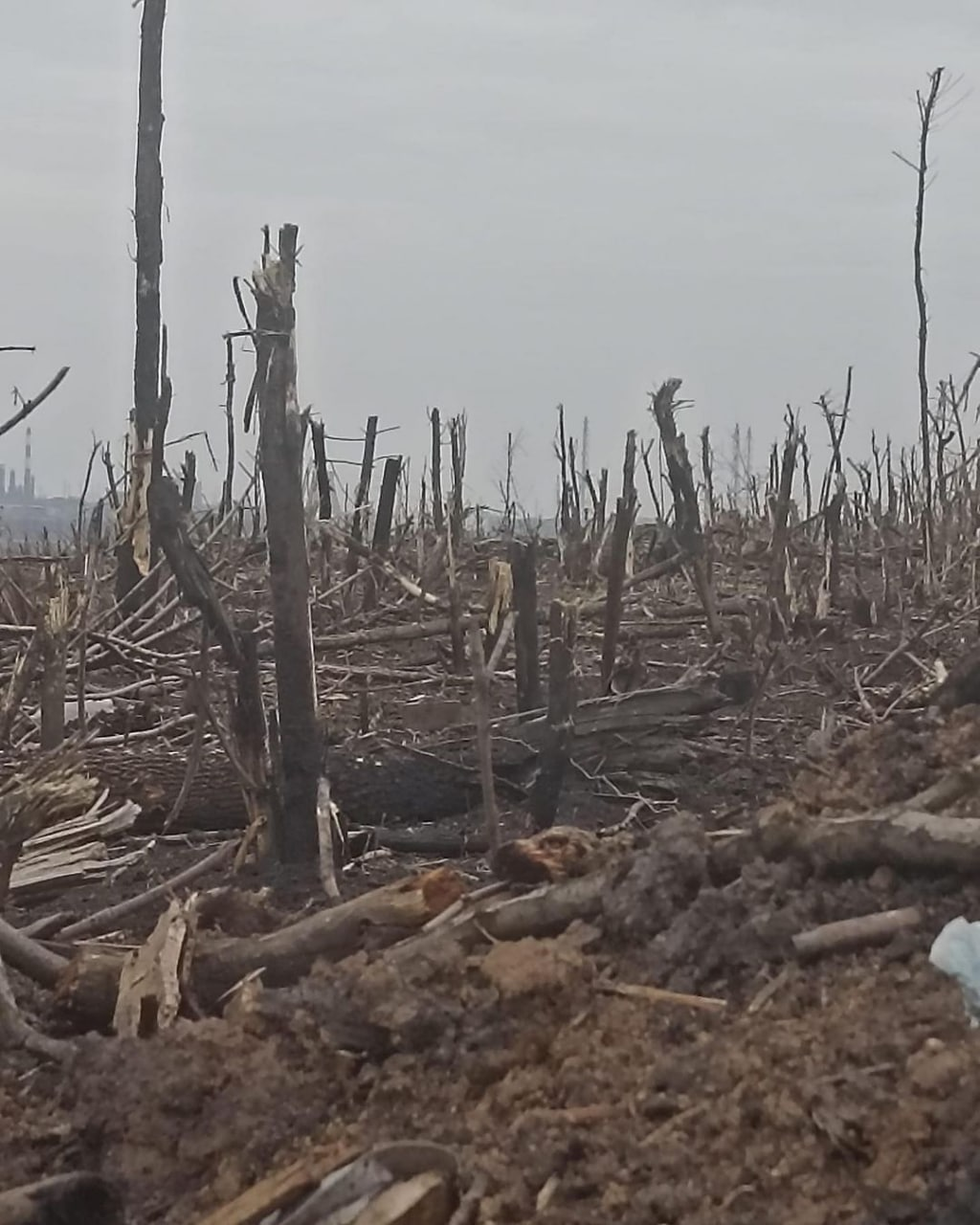
No man's land during the battle of Bakhmut, November 2022

Russian forces launched a renewed offensive in southern and northern Donetsk Oblast in early November, with Russian troops intensifying their attempts to break through Ukrainian defensive lines in Bakhmut, Soledar, Pavlivka, and Vuhledar. On 11 November, DPR forces were reported to have entered Pavlivka. Russian forces, including Wagner Group PMC fighters, overran defensive lines south of Bakhmut in late November, claiming to have captured the settlements of Kurdiumivka, Ozarianivka, Zelenopillia, and Andriivka by 30 November, while clashes in Opytne continued.

By December 2022, the Donbas was the site of the fiercest fighting in Ukraine. Russian and Ukrainian forces funneled reinforcements from other fronts to the Bakhmut–Soledar axis while Ukraine's eastern counteroffensive largely stalled along the Lyman–Kreminna–Svatove axis. Russia spent much of the month consolidating defence lines along the Kreminna–Svatove front, seeking to prevent a Ukrainian breakthrough to the P-66 highway; the Ukrainians, including the 92nd Mechanized Brigade, attempted intermittent local counterattacks across the line of contact while repelling many local Russian assaults. The Kreminna–Svatove line became a defensive flashpoint for Russia, which reportedly reinforced the area with two battalions of T-90 tanks and a few BMPT armoured fighting vehicles, and reportedly mobilised elements of the 144th Guards Motor Rifle Division and 8th Combined Arms Army. Both the Russians and Ukrainians claimed to be conducting offensive operations along this front line and repelling local enemy assaults; on 10 December, the Russian defence ministry said it was making new advances east of Lyman while the Institute for the Study of War assessed that Ukraine "likely" controlled the contested front line settlement of Chervonopopivka as of 22 December.

Meanwhile, multiple Russian sources reported that Wagner fighters had captured and were clearing Yakovlivka, located along Soledar's northeastern flank, by 7 December. The Russians also claimed to have shot down a Ukrainian Mi-8 helicopter in Yakovlivka on 8 December. Ukraine was reportedly rotating in fresh units in the Donbas by mid–December, particularly from the Kherson front. The 57th Motorised Brigade, 36th Marine Brigade, and the 46th Airmobile Brigade reinforced the Bakhmut front alongside the 24th Mechanized Brigade, relieving the 93rd, which had defended Bakhmut and Soledar for months. The 28th Brigade reportedly rotated to Kostiantynivka and the 18th Marine Infantry Battalion, 35th Marine Brigade reinforced Nevelske and Pervomaiske.

Heavy clashes along the Bakhmut–Soledar axis continued by 10 December, typified by grueling trench warfare, drone warfare, artillery duels, and minor ground assaults amid freezing temperatures. Zelenskyy accused Russia of having "destroyed" Bakhmut, saying there was "no residential space that hasn't been damaged by shelling for a long time." On 10 December, the Ukrainian General Staff said more than 20 settlements were bombarded in fighting in the Bakhmut area alone. Ukrainian paratroopers of the 71st Separate Huntsman Brigade reported repelling a Russian "sabotage and reconnaissance group" with mortar fire near Bakhmut, "eliminating" at least two attackers. On 16 December, Wagner PMC forces reportedly finished clearing Yakovlivka, further threatening Soledar's northeastern flank.

In southern and western Donetsk Oblast, the battle of Marinka continued, with DPR president Denis Pushilin claiming on 15 December that 80 per cent of the city had been captured amid ongoing heavy urban combat. Russia also continued demolition and reconstruction projects in Mariupol, reportedly seeking to turn the ruined city into a garrison city. Observers accused Russia of using the rebuilding efforts to cover up and destroy evidence of war crimes in Mariupol, particularly the March 2022 Mariupol theatre airstrike.

Russian regular, separatist, and Wagner PMC forces continued attempts to break defence lines on Bakhmut's southern and eastern flanks via small probing attacks; Wagner fighters spearheaded ground assaults into the city and its satellite suburbs, each of which Ukraine had turned into a stronghold. Media, government officials, and eyewitnesses described the fighting in Bakhmut as a "meat grinder" as both Ukrainian and Russian troops reportedly suffered heavy casualties daily with negligible changes on the front line.

The ISW assessed that the pace of Russia's Donbas advances in November and December was roughly equivalent to the pace in October. According to the ISW, Russian forces gained a total of 192 sq km in the Bakhmut sector between 1 October and 20 December. Footage posted online by a Russian journalist confirmed Russian forces had captured Andriivka, 10 km south of Bakhmut, by 22 December. The journalist claimed that Wagner fighters were fighting near Klishchiivka, where Ukraine reportedly had established strong defensive positions. Meanwhile, Ukraine continued to hold the northern half of Opytne and the western half of Marinka. On 26 December, Zelenskyy referred to Ukraine's situation in the Donbas as "difficult," saying the Russians were "using all the resources available to them ... to squeeze out at least some advance." Ukraine's Eastern Military Command reported that the Bakhmut area was shelled 225 times on 26 December alone.

==== Russian breakthroughs (December 2022 – March 2023) ====
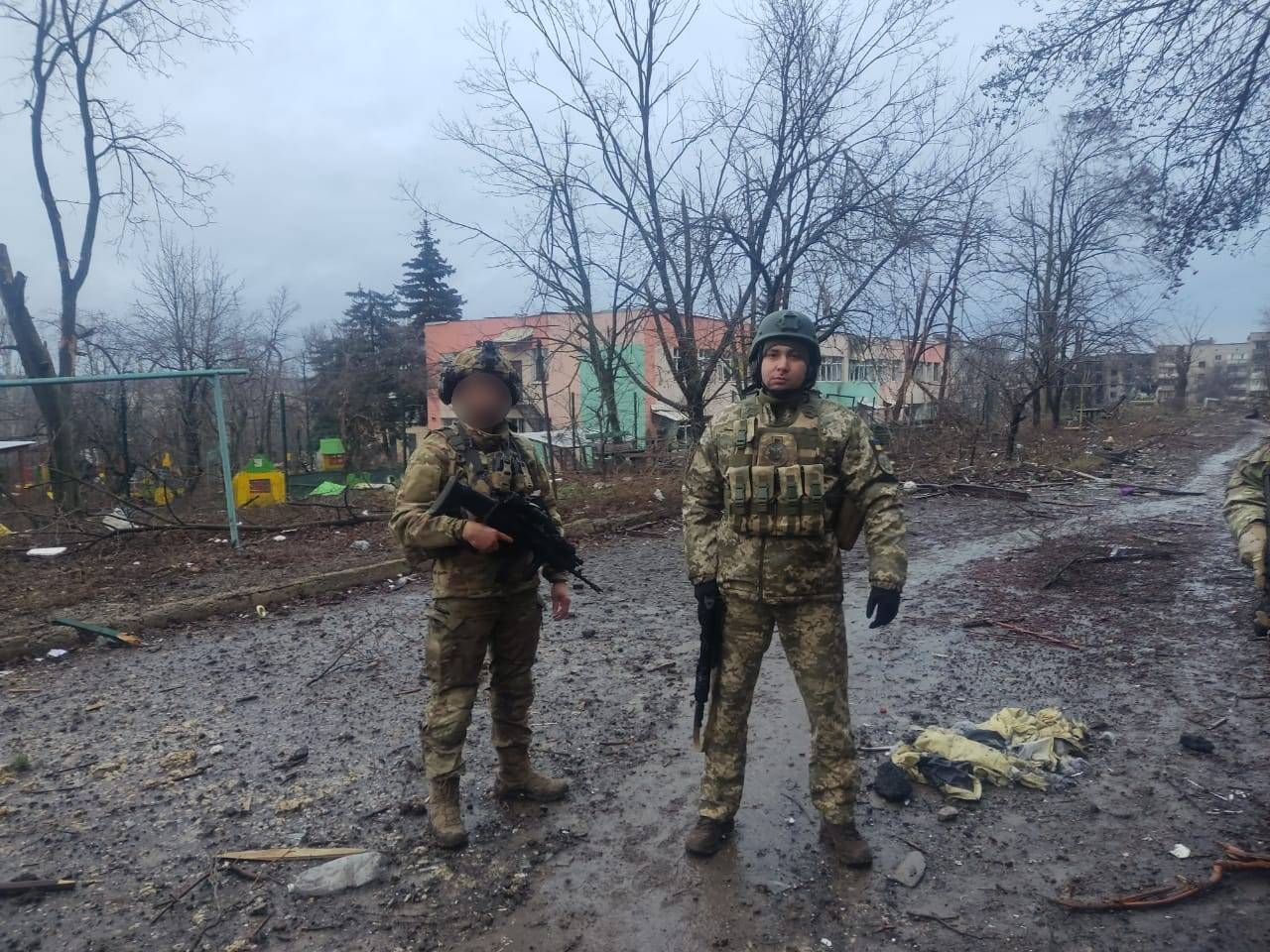
Ukrainian intelligence chief Kyrylo Budanov visiting troops in Bakhmut, December 2022

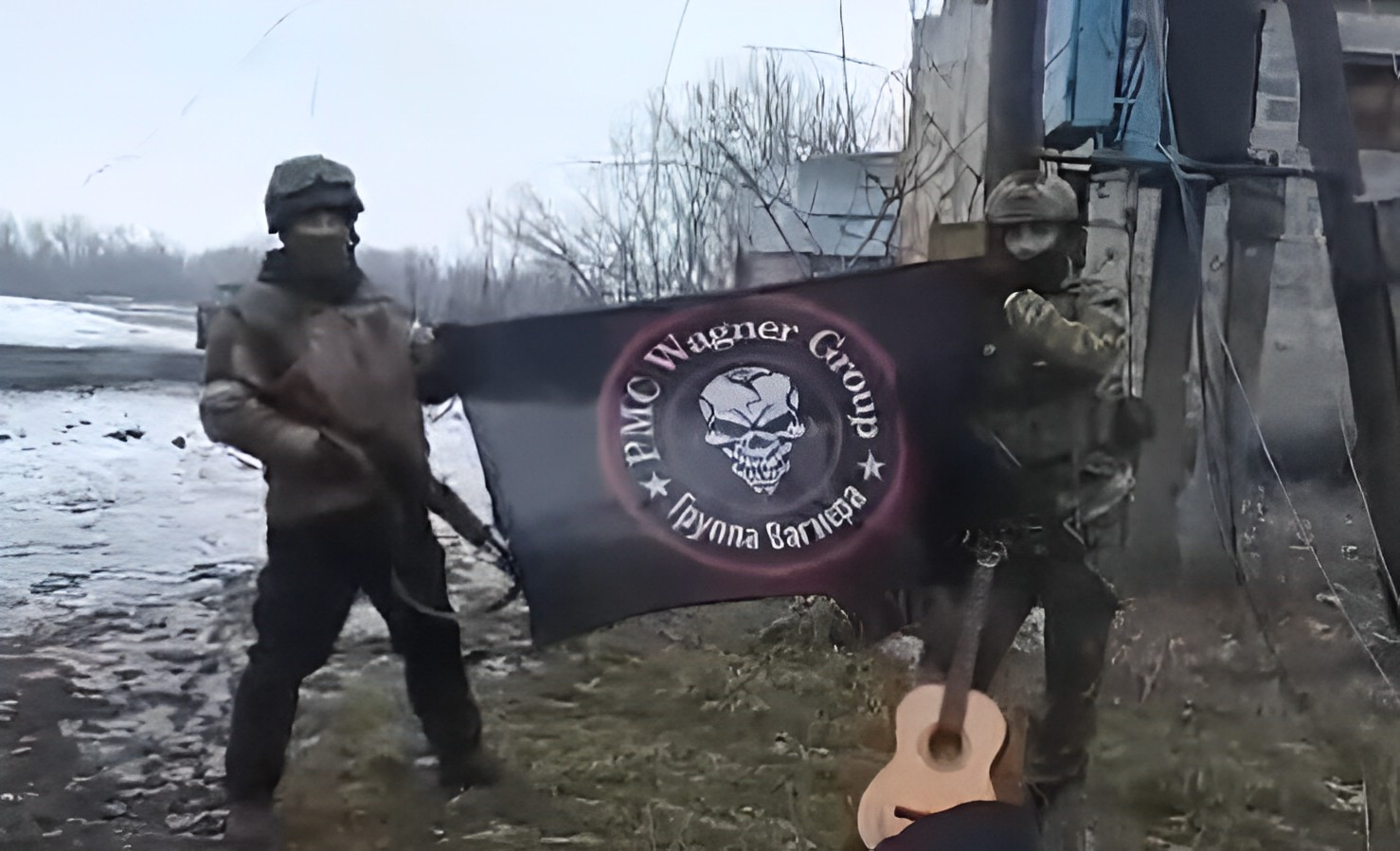
Wagner Group fighters pose after capturing the village of Mykolaivka, north of Soledar, 2 February 2023

Russian forces intensified their encirclement attempts of Bakhmut in the winter, as Wagner broke through Ukrainian defence lines in the salt-mining town of Soledar on 27 December, capturing Bakhmutske. Soledar itself was taken by 16 January 2023, degrading Bakhmut's northeastern defensive flanks. The recapture of Soledar allowed Russian forces, spearheaded by Wagner fighters, to further flank Bakhmut from the northeastern direction and assert control over a portion of the T0513 highway towards Siversk. Defences along Bakhmut's northern flank collapsed as the Ukrainians withdrew from Krasna Hora on 11 February. Wagner advanced 2–3 kilometres to the west of Blahodatne, capturing the area near the main M-03 highway leading into Bakhmut. Both the UK Defence Ministry and Ukraine's governor of Donetsk Pavlo Kyrylenko said the Russians were attempting a pincer movement of Bakhmut, enveloping the city from multiple directions and establishing fire control over most Ukrainian supply routes into it.

In mid-January, a battle took place in Vodiane. On 15 January, around 9–10 in the morning, elements of the DPR's 1st Slovyanska Separate Mechanized Brigade attacked eastern Vodiane from a frozen-over flooded area west of Opytne. These elements were not supported by artillery. At 12 pm, a convoy of eight to nine Russian BMP-2s heading towards Ukrainian-controlled west Vodiane was hit by Ukrainian fire, injuring 70% of the soldiers involved, according to the Russian commander of the attack. Two T-72Bs then approached the town, but were destroyed. A third and final attack took place in the afternoon, when some BMPs attempted to drive close to the bridge between Vodiane and Opytne (which had been destroyed during the fighting), but were also destroyed by artillery. There were also attacks on Sieverne, west of Avdiivka. On 10 February 2023, Russian fighters in Vodiane claimed that there is "not a single living creature in the town" from the destruction. A group of Russian soldiers from the "Storm" detachment from Kaliningrad released a video in March 2023, claiming they were suffering large losses while fighting in Vodiane.

By 22 February, Russian units had crossed the M-03 and began assaulting Yahidne and Berkhivka, northwest of Bakhmut, with the Ukrainians claiming to have repelled the assaults amid heavy fighting. Wagner claimed to have captured both villages by 26 February, however Ukraine's general staff said Russian assaults remained "unsuccessful" amid heavy shelling. Geolocated footage on 4 March showed Russian troops were advancing along both banks of the Berkhivka reservoir located about 4 kilometres northwest of Bakhmut, on the approaches to Khromove and Dubovo-Vasylivka villages, respectively. On 7 March, Ukraine ceded eastern Bakhmut to Russian forces, retreating west of the Bakhmutka river. Wagner claimed to have advanced along the M-03 and expanded the buffer zone north and west of Bakhmut, capturing the villages of Dubovo-Vasylivka and Zaliznianske by 16 March, however Ukrainian defenders stalled the advance along this axis by 19 March, repelling assaults on Orikhovo-Vasylivka, Bohdanivka, and Khromove villages.

In early March 2023, Zelenskyy referred to the ongoing fighting in the Donbas as "painful and difficult". Clashes around Avdiivka escalated in February and March, as the Ukrainians claimed Russian forces had begun an attempted encirclement effort of the city. Russian forces increased the amount of airstrikes in the area as ground units advanced towards Avdiivka's outskirts from the north and northeast, capturing Krasnohorivka (9 km north of Avdiivka) and Vesele (7 km north of Avdiivka) by 21 March. Further to the south, the grinding battle for Marinka had reduced the city to "post-apocalyptic" ruins as Russian ground units made minimal gains amid fierce urban combat with Ukrainian defenders. DPR leader Denis Pushilin claimed Ukraine was continuously transferring reserves to Marinka.

==== Capture of Bakhmut and Ukrainian flanking counterattacks (April–May 2023) ====
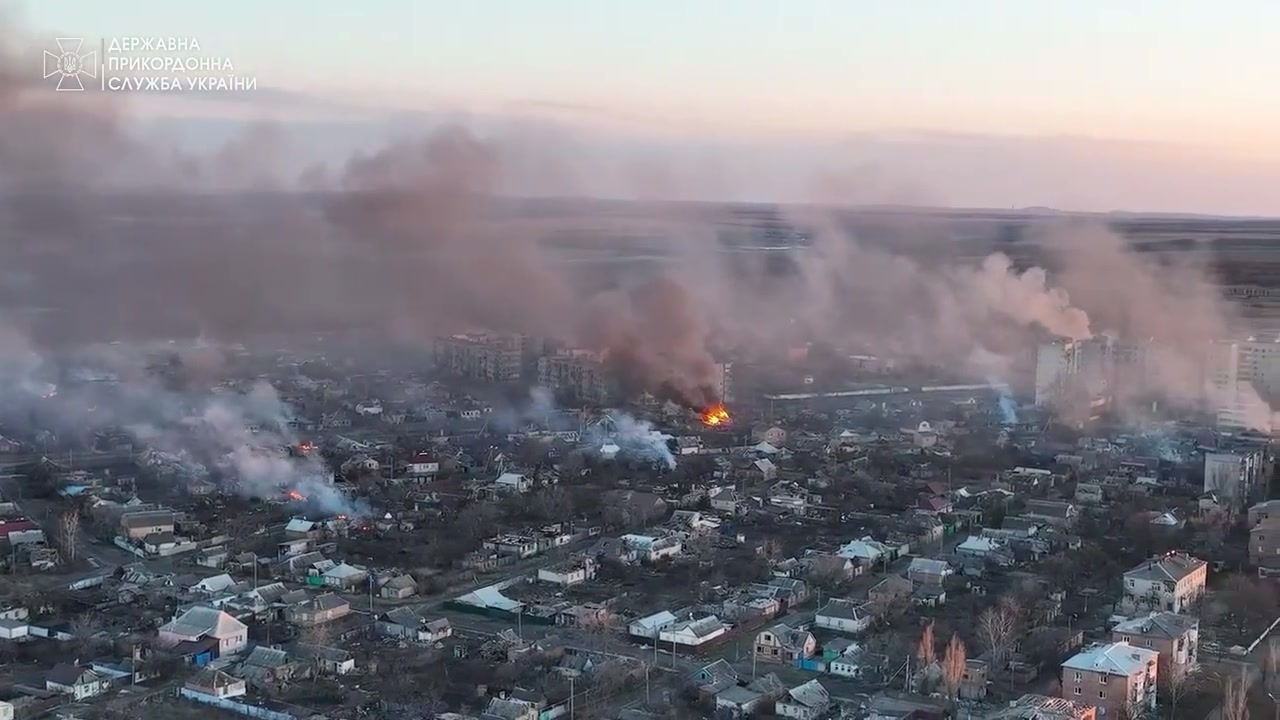
View of western Bakhmut during the battle, 5 April 2023

Fighting inside Bakhmut continued into April and May 2023. Russian forces controlled 95 per cent of the city by 18 May, having corralled Ukrainian defenders into a southwestern neighbourhood of multi-story residential buildings the Russians referred to as the "nest", where Ukraine had purportedly concentrated a large number of defending units. As Wagner fighters made gradual gains inside Bakhmut, Ukraine launched counterattacks on the southern and northwestern flanks of the city beginning around 10 May, resulting in Russian units abandoning positions near the Berkhivka reservoir and south of Ivanivske, on the approach to Klishchiivka. Ukraine's 3rd Assault Brigade reportedly partook in the recapture of 2 km of territory, in what Ukrainian commander Oleksandr Syrskyi called "the first successful offensive operation in the city's defense".

Despite the Ukrainian counterattacks threatening their flanks, Wagner continued to advance inside the city and claimed to have fully captured it on 20 May, adding that they planned to withdraw from the front line and be replaced by regular Russian troops after finishing clearing operations. Ukraine, however, denied that Bakhmut had fallen and claimed their forces were in the process of partially "encircling" the city via their multiple "localized" gains on the environs. By 21 May, Wagner forces had consolidated control over Bakhmut proper and halted their advance, with Ukrainian forces still operating in neighbouring localities west and south of the city. The ISW assessed that Ukrainian forces had withdrawn from the city itself but were still counterattacking on the outskirts.

=== 2023 Ukrainian counteroffensive and renewed Avdiivka assaults (June–October 2023) ===
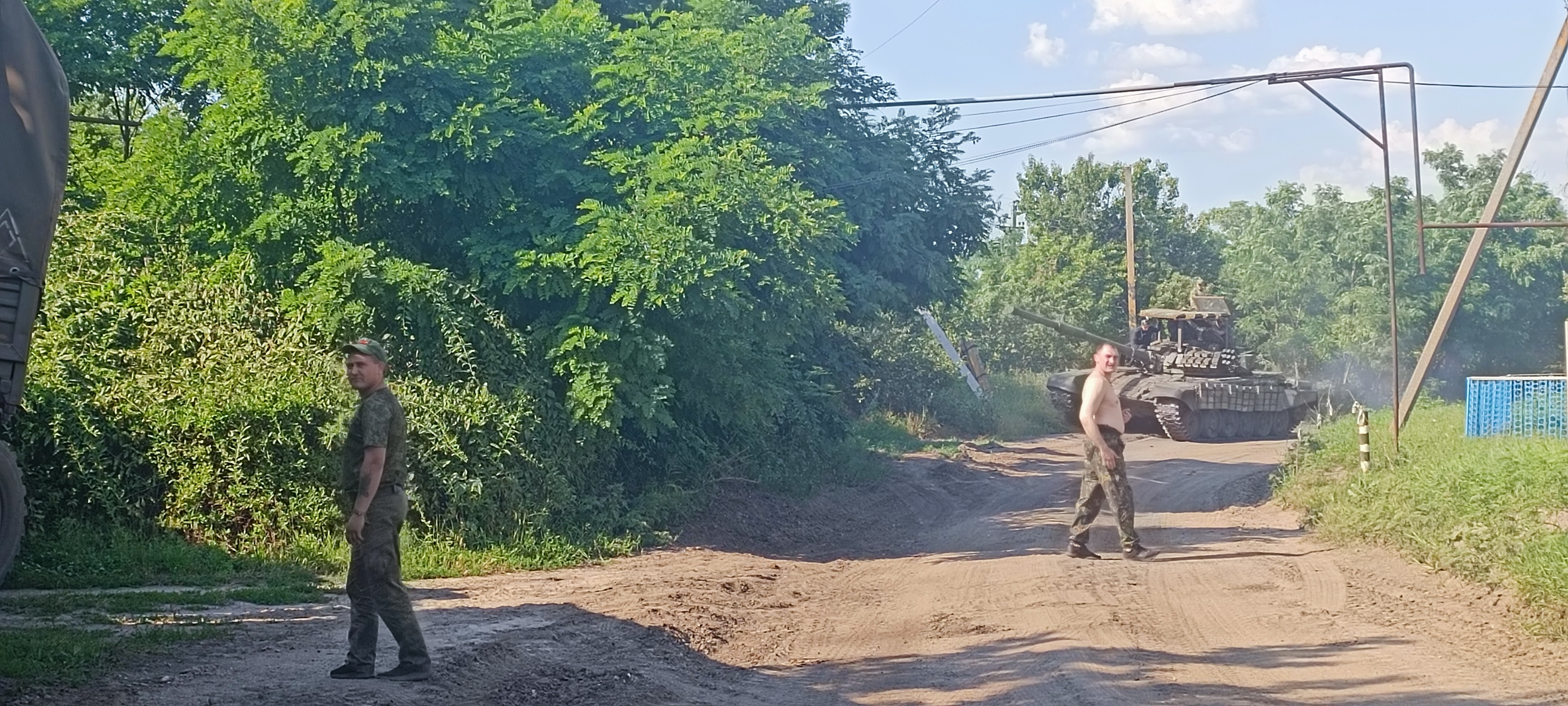
Russian tank inside Raihorodka village in Luhansk Oblast, July 2023

A Russian missile strike on the Mezhova railway station in Dnipropetrovsk Oblast, August 2023. Video released by the Russian Ministry of Defence.

Russian forces deploying incendiary munitions against Ukrainian positions on the Bakhmut front, October 2023

In early June 2023, Ukraine launched a large counteroffensive across the frontlines, including on the flanks of Bakhmut. These attacks focused around areas such as Andriivka, Klishchiivka, and Berkhivka, where Ukrainian forces made "marginal" gains. Ukraine's progress was notably hindered by dense Russian minefields, with the Russians reportedly using rocket systems to deploy mines in areas that Ukrainian troops had previously recaptured and cleared. By July 2023, Russian forces were largely maintaining a defensive posture along the vast majority of the frontline, with the Luhansk front being one of the few places where they reportedly remained on the offensive.

Meanwhile, internal tensions between the Russian defence ministry and the Wagner Group boiled over when the latter launched a one-day rebellion against the Russian government on 23 June, which was concluded with mediation by Belarus. Wagner leader Yevgeny Prigozhin later announced on 19 July that the PMC would no longer fight in Ukraine. Russia reportedly increased its oversight over Wagner forces after Prigozhin and two other Wagner commanders died in a plane crash on 23 August. Russian war blog Rybar reported Wagner fighters would return to the Bakhmut axis to help recapture lost positions. On 27 September, the Ukrainian military stated that "a maximum of several hundred" Wagner fighters had returned to Ukraine but dismissed their impact on the battlefield as negligible, describing them as a "remnant" force no longer fighting as a single unit—being instead dispersed throughout regular Russian units. Later, on 27 November, a Ukrainian Ground Forces spokesman said that "former Wagner Group members" were spotted fighting on the Lyman-Kupiansk front alongside Storm-Z units.

By October 2023, Ukraine was waging an "active defense" on the Bakhmut axis after recapturing Andriivka and Klishchiivka, holding the line while conducting offensive operations to improve tactical positions when possible. However, Ukrainian assaults began slowly culminating on this front by the end of the month. The ISW reported on 27 October that Russian forces were conducting successful counterattacks on Bakhmut's flanks, recapturing positions south of the Berkhivka reservoir that they lost months prior, along with making marginal gains west of Kurdyumivka, located 13 km southwest of Bakhmut. In turn, Ukrainian troops reportedly pushed the Russians out of several positions east of the Bakhmut-Horlivka railway line in the area of Andriivka.

In early October 2023, as Ukraine's larger counteroffensive nominally continued on other fronts, Russian forces began a localised offensive against Avdiivka, attempting to encircle the fortified city.

On 30 October 2023, Ukrainian general Oleksandr Syrskyi stated Russian forces were transferring reserves and "significantly" strengthening its grouping on the Bakhmut front in preparation of a renewed offensive to recapture lost positions along Bakhmut's flanks. Ukrainian military spokesperson Volodymyr Fityo, citing intelligence reports, stated the Russians were preparing since early October 2023 and that Ukrainian troops had been strengthening "defensive positions, engineering fortifications and pulling up reserves" in response. Russian sources, including the Russian defence ministry, said that elements of the 331st Guards Airborne Regiment, 98th and 106th Guards Airborne Division, 200th Separate Motor Rifle Brigade, "Viking" spetsnaz detachment, and the "Alexander Nevsky" Assault Brigade, were among the personnel operating on the Bakhmut front around this time.

=== Second Russian winter campaign (November 2023 – April 2024) ===
==== Early winter (November–December 2023) ====
In early November, positional battles south of Bakhmut continued along the Klishchiivka-Andriivka-Kurdiumivka railway line, while Russian sources claimed increased offensive operations on the Berkhivka Reservoir axis further northwest of Bakhmut. On 6 November, Ukrainian and Russian sources reported that Russian troops had made a "marginal" advance south of the Berkhivka Reservoir, though it was unclear at the time if they recaptured the entire reservoir or just the southern shore. On 10 November, Russian sources reported Russian troops had regained lost positions in forestry north of Klishchiivka and a tree line north of Andriivka, pushing Ukrainian forces away from the railway line and the T0513 highway, however Ukrainian mines, drones, and artillery were complicating the advance. In turn, the Ukrainian General Staff reported repelling assaults near Bohdanivka, Ivanivske, Klishchiivka, and Andriivka.

In mid-November, General Syrskyi confirmed Russian forces had intensified their assaults north and south of Bakhmut in an attempt to regain the initiative and retake lost positions.

On 13–14 November, Russian troops—including elements of the 98th Guards Airborne Division's "Storm" Division—advanced west of Yahidne, advancing along a tree line southwest of Orikhovo-Vasylivka towards Bohdanivka and securing new positions near the Berkhivka Reservoir in the process. Russian troops reportedly crossed the railway north of Klishchiivka and were consolidating positions, though Ukraine's 93rd Mechanized Brigade claimed artillery had pushed them back across the railway. Yuri Fedorenko, the commander of the drone specialist "Achilles" Company, confirmed the situation in the Bakhmut direction was becoming complicated, crediting Russian troops' constantly shifting tactics and heavy usage of battlefield drones. Meanwhile, the Ukrainian General Staff reported repelling numerous assaults north and south of Bakhmut in its daily reports, including towards Bohdanivka, Ivanivske, Andriivka, Klishchiivka, and west of Dubovo-Vasylivka. On 16 November, Maksym Zhorin, the deputy commander of the 3rd Assault Brigade, accused Russian troops of deploying chemical weapons during clashes near Bakhmut.

By 19 November, the Russians were continuing assaults towards Khromove village, Bohdanivka, and against Klishchiivka, where the Ukrainians continued to hold the tactical heights west of the village. On 29 November, Russia said its forces had taken control of Khromove.

By November 2023, both the Russians and Ukrainians were reportedly using cluster munitions on the eastern front, with the Russian cluster munitions being air-launched and Ukrainian cluster munitions, supplied by the United States, being fired via artillery. Around 20 November, video emerged online of Russian forces reportedly targeting Ukrainian positions near Staromaiorske with RBK-500 cluster munitions fitted with UMPK glide bomb guidance kits. According to The War Zone online magazine, the UMPK-fitted RBK-500s are considered highly effective against personnel and soft targets, making them a logical weapon of choice for Russia in eastern Ukraine, where fighting is dominated by trench warfare amid treelines and open terrain. According to a Ukrainian platoon commander on the Bakhmut front, their cluster munitions were becoming increasingly ineffective as the Russians adapted; Russian troops began assaulting positions in smaller units and were digging their trenches deeper and making them harder to strike.

Between 8 and 9 December, on the Bakhmut-Soledar front, Russian troops reportedly advanced 1.5 kilometres and 3.5 kilometres total in an apparent attempt to encircle Vesele, located 20 kilometres northeast of Bakhmut. Over a month later, on 18 January 2024, the Russian defence ministry claimed Russian troops had captured Vesele. Though located near Soledar, it marked the first settlement captured on the southern approach to the Siversk-Bilohorivka axis, a section of the eastern front that remained mostly stagnant throughout 2023. The Russian claims of advances were not independently verified at the time.

Russian forces captured Marinka on 25 December. According to The New York Times, the capture of the ruined city was further evidence that Russian forces had seized the initiative in the war after Ukraine's largely unsuccessful summer counteroffensive. The stalled Ukrainian offensive and renewed Russian assaults resulted in Russian forces ultimately seizing more territory in 2023 than they lost.

==== Avdiivka breakthrough and Ocheretyne salient (January 2024 – April 2024) ====
Russian Pacific Fleet marines fighting in Novomykhailivka, February 2024. Video released by the Russian Ministry of Defence.

The Russian offensive on the Bakhmut front continued into January 2024, slowly pushing west towards Chasiv Yar, with ongoing clashes in and near Bohdanivka, and along the Ivanivske-Andriivka-Klishchiivka axis. General Oleksandr Syrskyi said Russian forces were using kamikaze drones and electronic warfare alongside assault groups supported by artillery to break through Ukrainian defences on the Bakhmut front. On 20 January 2024, Ukrainian spokesperson Colonel Oleksandr Shtupun stated that Russia was focusing its assault operations in Donetsk on Avdiivka and Novomykhailivka, adding that Russian ground assaults were mostly composed of infantry, with very limited armoured vehicle support. Russian forces had conducted 592 artillery strikes and launched three missile strikes on the Donetsk front in the past 24 hours, according to Shtupun.

In late January–early February 2024, Russian forces broke through Ukrainian defences in Avdiivka and began flanking and encircling troops of the embattled 110th Mechanized Brigade, prompting a Ukrainian retreat and resulting in Russian forces capturing the fortified city after months of deadly fighting. The Russians continued to advance west of Avdiivka, reportedly capturing Lastochkyne, Stepove and Sieverne by 27 February. Syrskyi said that the 3rd Assault and 25th Airborne Brigades had pushed Russian troops back from Orlivka on 29 February. Clashes also continued for Novomykhailivka, with Russia claiming to have captured Pobieda on 22 February, further threatening Novomykhailivka's northern flank and expanding the buffer zone south of Marinka.

In February–March 2024, Russian forces continued offensive operations on the Bohdanivka-Chasiv Yar direction, namely along the O0506 highway, north and northeast of Ivanivske, and by attempting to bypass the heights north and northwest of Klishchiivka, according to Ukrainian military observer Kostyantyn Mashovets. On 21–23 February, Russian sources claimed that Russian troops, including elements of the 98th Guards Airborne Division, had entered the eastern outskirts of Ivanivske and advanced to Sadova Street amid fierce clashes. By 3 March, Russian troops had reached central Ivanivske. Ukraine's Tavria operational-strategic group said defenders were managing to build isolated ramparts, bunkers and anti-tank ditches amid the fighting. After weeks of fighting, the Russian defence ministry claimed the capture of Ivanivske on 23 March, although DeepState mapping claimed the town was still contested as of 2 April. The Russians nevertheless continued their advance towards Chasiv Yar, reportedly capturing operationally important heights north of the city and Ivanivske respectively.

Clashes continued west and south of Avdiivka in March and April 2024, particularly along the Tonenke-Orlivka-Berdychi line and the Vodiane-Pervomaiske front. By 1 March, the Russians had a foothold on the eastern outskirts of Berdychi, had entered central Orlivka, and were threatening the northern and eastern flanks of Tonenke. The Russians later claimed to have captured Orlivka on 19 March and Tonenke on 21 March. On 12 March, the Russian defence ministry claimed the capture of Nevelske, a village located on the southern flank of Pervomaiske and less than 15 kilometres (9.3 miles) north of Krasnohorivka. The Russians claimed to have captured Vodiane on 5 April and reportedly captured Pervomaiske by 10 April.

On 14–16 April, Russian forces began expanding Avdiivka's northern flank, capturing the Zarya dachas and swiftly moving on to establish a foothold in Ocheretyne, creating a salient. Russian troops exploited the breach in defences, capturing Ocheretyne by 28 April. Russian forces expanded the salient by quickly capturing the villages of Novobakhmutivka by 28 April and Soloviove by 1 May along Ocheretyne's southern flank. The Russians were concurrently advancing on a second axis northwards, east of the Ocheretyne salient, towards Novokalynove and Keramik, which were both likely captured by the end of April. After capturing Ocheretyne and Keramik, the Russians further advanced northwards and captured Arkhanhelske by 5 May, according to DeepState; Russia later claimed the capture of Arkhanhelske on 25 May.

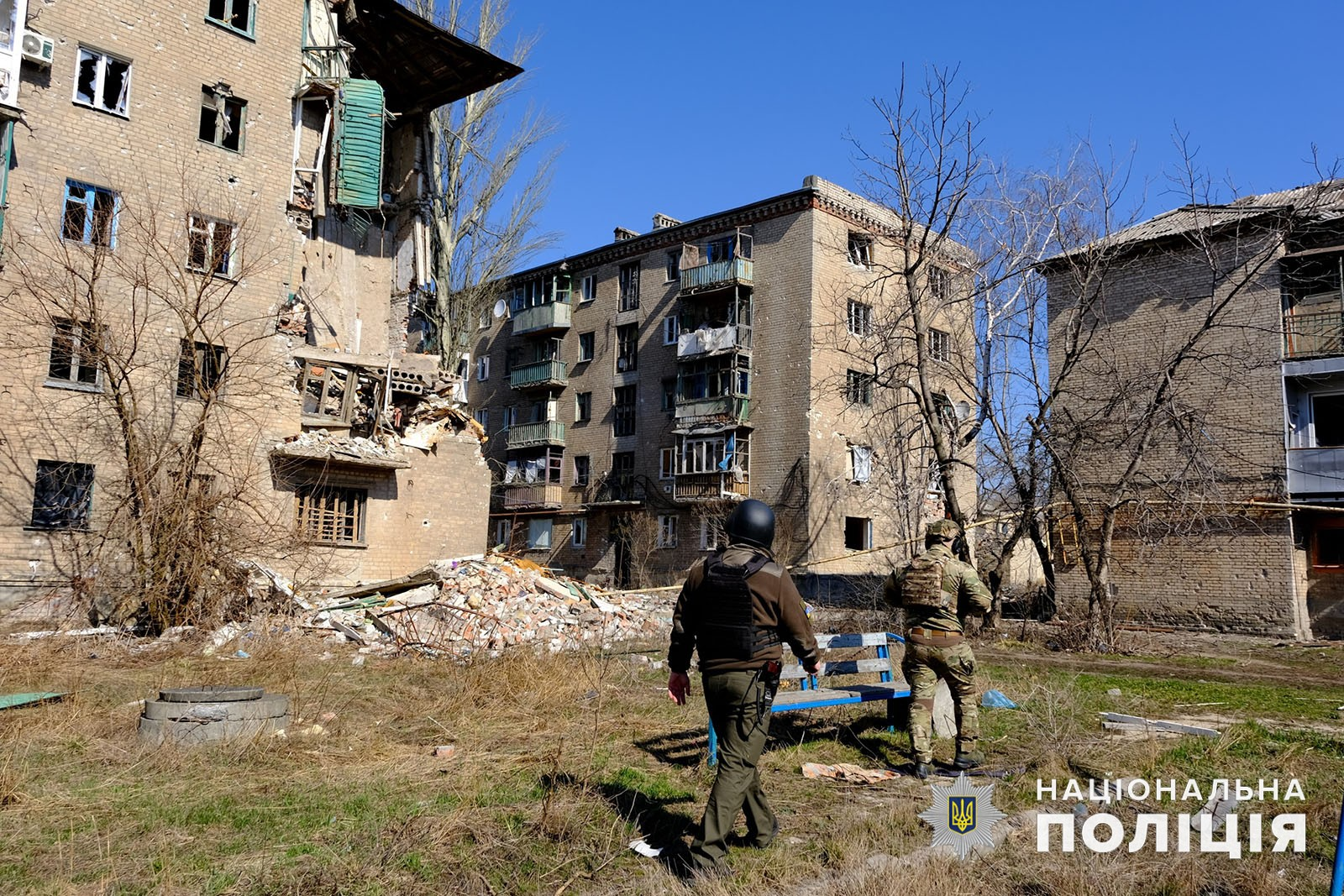
Damaged buildings in Chasiv Yar, 30 March 2024

On 25 April, the ISW assessed that although Russia was seeking further "tactical gains" northwest of Avdiivka, Chasiv Yar remained the primary target of the spring campaign.

=== Russian general offensive (April 2024–present) ===
==== Donetsk Oblast ====
Russian media reported on 5 April that their troops had entered the eastern suburbs of Chasiv Yar. Ukraine's eastern command denied these reports but admitted the situation on the city's outskirts had become "tense". On 6 April, Colonel-General Oleksandr Syrskyi–who succeeded Valerii Zaluzhnyi as Ukraine's commander-in-chief on 8 February–stated "Today, the fiercest battles are underway in the areas of Pervomaiske and Vodiane, as well as east of Chasiv Yar, where the enemy is trying to break through our defense lines."

On 13 April 2024, Syrskyi stated the situation on the eastern front had "deteriorated significantly" in recent days and that fighting had intensified following the 2024 Russian presidential election. Syrskyi partially attributed recent Russian gains in Donetsk Oblast to their superior weaponry and spoke of the need for training of more Ukrainian infantry units. The same day, DeepStateMap.Live reported that Russian forces captured Bohdanivka, which is located less than 6 miles (10 km) east of Chasiv Yar; the Russian defence ministry later confirmed its capture on 21 April.

Concurrent with the Chasiv Yar and Krasnohorivka battles, Russian troops also continued their ground advances on other axes in Donetsk into May 2024. Russian troops reportedly entered Umanske on 9 May 2024. After a local offensive, Russian troops recaptured Klishchiivka and Andriivka by 23 May, ending months of positional warfare after Ukraine retook the ruined villages in September 2023. Russia claimed to have captured the village of Netailove on 27 May 2024,located less than 15 kilometres northwest of Donetsk city's outskirts. Ukraine's General Staff reported "tense" clashes near Netailove, but did not confirm or deny the village's capture.

Russian soldiers operating FPV drones against Ukrainian positions in Donetsk Oblast, 6 June 2024. Video released by the Russian Ministry of Defence.

After months of clashes following the fall of Marinka, Russian sources reported the capture of Heorhiivka around 14 June 2024. The UK defence ministry stated in its 18 June 2024 intelligence update that Russian forces had likely captured Novooleksandrivka located just over 12 miles west of Avdiivka on the approach to the T-05-04 road. This has been one of the main supply routes for Ukrainian forces on the Donetsk front that links Pokrovsk, Kostiantynivka and Bakhmut.

On 18 June 2024, Russia launched a new offensive towards the city of Toretsk, and by 21 June had captured a village east of it, Shumy. Fighting began in the satellite settlements east of Toretsk of Pivdenne, Zalizne, Druzhba, and Pivnichne, and by the end of June Russian forces had a foothold in all of these settlements. On 2 July, Russian forces advanced 4 kilometres (2.5 mi) north to reach and advance into southern Niu-York, a rural settlement south of Toretsk, attempting to capture Toretsk from the east and south.

Concurrent with the advances near Toretsk, Russian forces continued to expand the Avdiivka salient after the capture of Novooleksandrivka; Sokil by 6 July 2024 and Voskhod by 11 July were both captured, west of Ocheretyne. Urozhaine, east of Staromaiorske, was taken around 13 July 2024, and in the direction of Siversk, Russian forces restarted offensive manoeuvres to capture Spirne and Ivano-Daryivka around 17 July.

On 18 July 2024, Russian forces entered Prohres, west of Ocheretyne, and captured it on 19 July, marking a new phase for the battle northwest of Avdiivka, as Russian forces advanced towards and hoped to seize the city of Pokrovsk, a key Ukrainian logistical hub connecting two supply highways. Russian forces also seized the villages of Lozuvatske and Vovche, north and south of Prohres, in the week after the latter's capture. The situation, described as "tense and difficult", and Russian advances in the Pokrovsk front, were attributed to a lack of Ukrainian supplies and manpower. On 24 July, a large mechanised assault was launched by Russia towards Kurakhove, with heavy losses; another was launched by Russia towards Kostiantynivka in Pokrovsk Raion the same day, again taking significant losses, but nevertheless gaining a foothold in the village.

In August 2024, Russia continued making significant advances in the direction of Pokrovsk, while expanding their control in the area in and around Toretsk. The Pokrovsk front had become the most active area of the frontline as Russia's main goal in eastern Ukraine by early August. Following Ukraine's incursion into Russia's Kursk Oblast in early August 2024, the rate of Russian advance near Pokrovsk increased, where Russian forces at the axis of advance had been bolstered. By mid-August, Russia was reportedly 10 kilometres from Pokrovsk, and continued to advance through settlements east of the city, including in Hrodivka, a town situated on the last line of defence (a line running through Hrodivka–Novohrodivka–Selydove north to south) ahead of Pokrovsk itself. In late August, Russia entered Toretsk from two axes of advance, entering it from Pivnichne to the east and Zalizne to the south. On 27 August, Russia captured the key city of Novohrodivka, nine kilometres east of Pokrovsk, in an engagement reportedly lasting only three days. The following day, fighting reportedly began over Selydove as Russian forces entered the city from the east, capturing parts of the E50 highway southeast of Pokrovsk in the process.

On 27 August 2024 Russia concurrently captured significant portions of the highway running from Marinka to Vuhledar, and likely seized in entirety the village of Kostiantynivka intersected by the road. In late August, a renewed offensive was launched towards Vuhledar. The villages of Prechystivka and Vodiane were captured on 3 and 8 September 2024, west and northeast of Vuhledar, while assaults near Vuhledar itself arose. Russian forces encircled the city, hampering the transport of Ukrainian supplies into the city and the ability of defending soldiers to move out of it. The city was captured by Russia on 1 October.

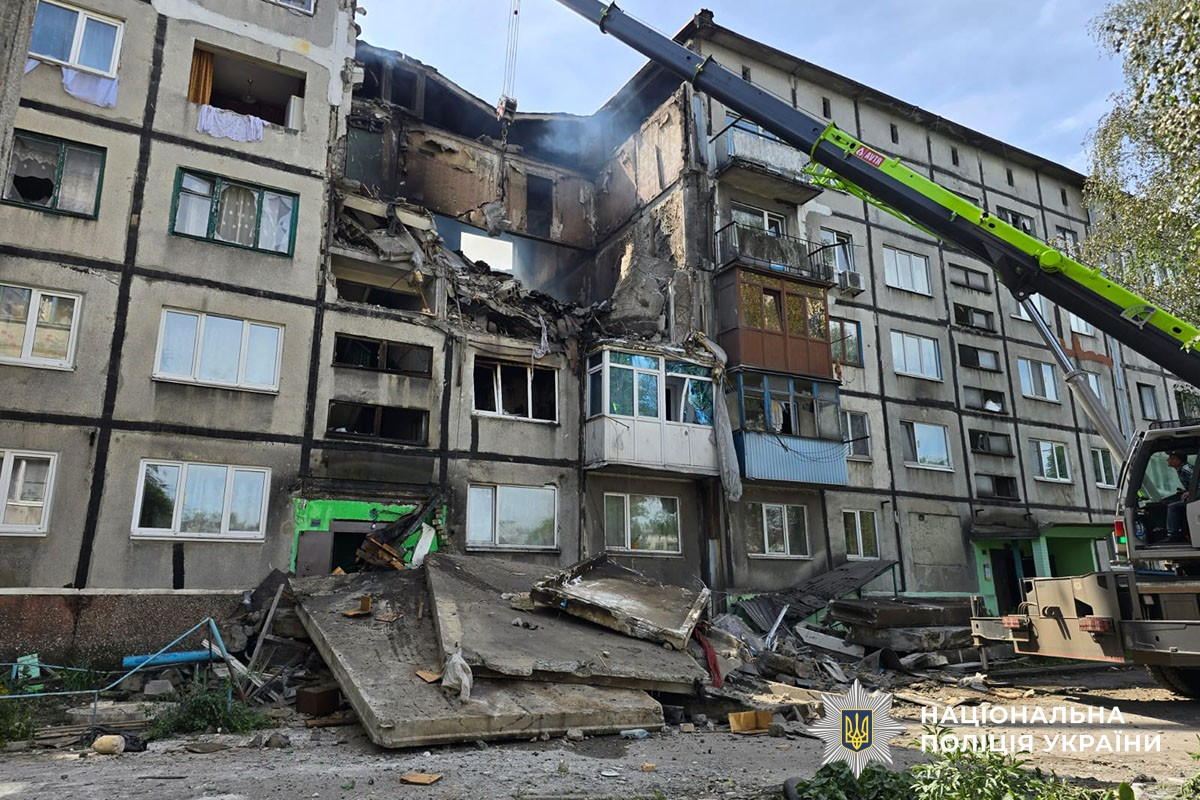
Apartment building in Bilozerske (Donetsk Oblast) after Russian drone strike on 30 May 2025

On 9 September 2024, the city of Krasnohorivka was captured. On 17 September, Russia captured the city of Ukrainsk, southeast of Pokrovsk, after their forces had reportedly entered the city by 6 September 2024. In September, nearby Ukrainsk, fighting began over the settlement Tsukuryne and the city of Hirnyk, as Russian forces pressed further towards Kurakhove. By 10 October, Russia captured the settlement of Tsukuryne south of Selydove, and Mykolaivka, Krasnyi Yar, Krutyi Yar next to Myrnohrad. Russia captured the cities of Selydove and Hirnyk in late October.

East of Kurakhove, Russian forces took full control over Maksymilianivka in mid-October 2024, as well as the settlement of Ostrivske at the Kurakhove reservoir. After the village's capture, fighting over Kurakhove began. Russian forces seized the mining settlement of Kurakhivka and advanced into Kurakhove proper in late October.

After the capture of Vuhledar, Russian forces exploited the city's fall to make significant advances north and northwest of it; the settlements of Bohoiavlenka, Novoukrainka, Yasna Poliana, Shakhtarske, and Maksymivka were captured in late October to early November 2024.

In late December 2024, Russian forces captured Kurakhove after two months of fighting. The Kurakhove Power Station was confirmed to have come under Russian control in early January 2025. In late January, Russian forces captured the fortified settlement Velyka Novosilka.

==== Northern Kharkiv Oblast ====
Damaged and destroyed buildings in Vovchansk, 2 June 2024

On 10 May 2024, as Russian forces continued their gradual advances in Donetsk and Luhansk oblasts, they launched a new offensive in Ukraine's Kharkiv Oblast, using shelling, air strikes and dismounted infantry to breach defences in the Vovchansk and Kharkiv directions. On 17 May, Col. Gen. Oleksandr Syrskyi stated that the new offensive "expanded the zone of active hostilities by almost 70 kilometers." By 21 May, Russia had reoccupied 13 (Note: Borysivka, Buhruvatka, Hatyshche, Kharkiv Oblast, Hlyboke, Kharkiv Oblast, Krasne, Lukiantsi, Morokhovets, Ohirtseve, Oliinykove, Pletenivka, Pylna, Strilecha and Tykhe.) villages and settlements in Kharkiv Oblast and had advanced up to the northern bank of the Vovcha river in Vovchansk.

Early speculation Regarding the purpose of the operation ranged from it being an intent to capture Kharkiv to it serving as a feint to stretch Ukrainian defence lines, forcing them to shift reserves away from other fronts, particularly the Donbas front. On 17 May, President Vladimir Putin stated that Russia was aiming to create a "buffer zone" in Kharkiv Oblast to prevent further attacks on Belgorod while denying that there were plans to capture Kharkiv city. Earlier that same week, Ukrainian president Volodymyr Zelenskyy stated the Russian advance was stopped at the first line of defence, while Ukrainian intelligence chief Kyrylo Budanov reportedly warned that Russia may launch a new ground incursion into Sumy Oblast.

By 23 May, Russian troops had become "completely bogged down" amid urban combat in Vovchansk, according to Syrskyi. On 24 May, Ukraine's General Staff stated that Ukrainian forces had "halted" the Kharkiv offensive and were conducting counterattacks, adding that the most intense fighting in Ukraine was occurring in Kharkiv and Donetsk oblasts.

==== Luhansk Oblast and eastern Kharkiv Oblast ====
On 20 May, the Russian defence ministry stated it had fully recaptured Bilohorivka in Luhansk Oblast, however Ukraine's General Staff stated Ukrainian forces were still "holding back" Russian forces near the settlement.

On 27 May 2024, Russia announced the capture of the village of Ivanivka in northeastern Kharkiv Oblast, located around 20 kilometres east of Kupiansk. On 9 June, the Institute for the Study of War assessed that Russian forces had "likely recently seized" the village of Ivanivka in the Kharkiv Oblast citing geolocated footage.

On 20 July 2024, Russia was confirmed to have recaptured Pishchane in eastern Kharkiv Oblast.

On 29 August 2024, footage showed that Russia had made advances in central Synkivka, with some sources saying the village had been captured. On 30 August, Russia seized the village of Stelmakhivka.

By 6 September 2024, Russian forces had completely seized Synkivka. Further advances south in the ensuing week were made into northern Petropavlivka.

By 10 October 2024, Russian forces captured Myasozharivka.

== Order of battle ==
=== Russia and pro-Russian separatists ===
- Russian Armed Forces
  - Russian Ground Forces
    - 1st Guards Tank Army
      - 4th Guards Tank Division
        - 423rd Motor Rifle Regiment
        - 13th Tank Regiment
    - 2nd Guards Tank Army
      - 30th Separate Motorised Infantry Brigade
    - 5th Combined Arms Army
      - 60th Separate Motor Rifle Brigade
    - 6th Combined Arms Army
      - 138th Separate Mechanized Brigade
    - 8th Combined Arms Army
      - 150th Rifle Division
        - 68th Tank Regiment
    - 20th Guards Combined Arms Army
      - 3rd Motor Rifle Division
      - 144th Guards Motor Rifle Division
    - 35th Combined Arms Army
      - 64th Guards Motor Rifle Brigade
    - 41st Combined Arms Army
      - 74th Separate Guards Motor Rifle Brigade
    - 58th Guards Combined Arms Army
    - 68th Army Corps
    - 90th Guards Tank Division
    - 232nd Rocket Artillery Brigade
    - 4th Tank Division
    - 71st Motor Rifle Regiment
    - Central Grouping of Forces
    - 1st Army Corps (People's Militia of the Donetsk People's Republic)
      - Republican Guard
        - Pyatnashka Brigade
      - Sparta Battalion
      - Somalia Battalion
      - Vostok Brigade
    - 2nd Army Corps (People's Militia of the Luhansk People's Republic)
      - Prizrak Brigade
      - Cossack battalions
  - Russian Air Force
  - Russian Airborne Forces
    - 11th Guards Air Assault Brigade
    - 76th Guards Air Assault Division
    - 98th Guards Airborne Division
    - 106th Airborne Division
  - Russian Navy
    - Russian Naval Infantry
      - 810th Guards Naval Infantry Brigade
    - Black Sea Fleet
    - Baltic Fleet
      - 11th Army Corps
      - 336th Guards Naval Infantry Brigade
    - Northern Fleet
    - Pacific Fleet
  - Logistical Support of the Russian Armed Forces
    - Russian Railway Troops
      - 29th Separate Railway Brigade
- GRU
  - Spetsnaz GRU
    - 3rd Guards Spetsnaz Brigade
- National Guard of Russia
  - 141st Special Motorised Regiment
    - North Battalion
- Wagner Group
  - DShRG Rusich
  - Black Russians

Redut

- Veterans Battalion

=== Ukraine ===
- Armed Forces of Ukraine
  - Ukrainian Ground Forces
    - 3rd Assault Brigade
    - 4th Tank Brigade
    - 10th Mountain Assault Brigade
    - 17th Tank Brigade
    - 24th Mechanized Brigade
    - 28th Mechanized Brigade
    - 43rd Heavy Artillery Brigade
    - 49th "Carpathian Sich" Battalion
    - 53rd Mechanized Brigade
    - 56th Motorised Brigade
    - 57th Motorised Brigade
    - 58th Motorised Brigade
    - 60th Separate Infantry Brigade
    - 92nd Mechanized Brigade
    - 93rd Mechanized Brigade
    - 110th Mechanized Brigade
    - 128th Mountain Assault Brigade
    - Ukrainian Volunteer Corps
      - 2nd Separate Battalion
  - Ukrainian Air Assault Forces
    - 25th Airborne Brigade
    - 46th Airmobile Brigade
    - 71st Jaeger Brigade
    - 79th Air Assault Brigade
    - 80th Air Assault Brigade
    - 81st Airmobile Brigade
    - 95th Air Assault Brigade
  - Ukrainian Navy
    - Ukrainian Naval Infantry
      - 35th Separate Marine Brigade
        - 18th Marine Infantry Battalion
      - 36th Separate Marine Brigade
  - Ukrainian Air Force
  - Territorial Defense Forces
    - 227th Kharkiv Territorial Defense Battalion
    - International Legion of Territorial Defense of Ukraine
      - Kastuś Kalinoŭski Battalion (Belarusian contingent)
      - Freedom of Russia Legion
      - Armed Forces of the Chechen Republic of Ichkeria-in-exile
        - Sheikh Mansur Battalion (Note: Initially participated in the battle of Mariupol but eventually left to fight in the battle of Kyiv. It later returned to fight in the Battle of Bakhmut.)
        - Dzhokhar Dudayev Battalion
        - Separate Special-Purpose battalion (including Ajnad al-Kavkaz)
- Ukrainian Ministry of Internal Affairs
  - National Guard of Ukraine
    - 2nd Galician Brigade
    - 12th Operational Brigade (Ukraine)
    - 23rd Public Order Brigade
    - 26th Separate Battalion
    - 4th Rapid Reaction Brigade
    - Azov Special Operations Detachment
    - 18th Sloviansk Brigade
      - Donbas Battalion
  - National Police of Ukraine
  - Ukrainian Border Guard

== Casualties ==
=== Military casualties ===
According to Ukrainian sources, more than 500 wounded Russian soldiers, most of them recently mobilised, were hospitalised in the occupied city of Horlivka between 10 and 16 November 2022.

On 1 October 2023, a Ukrainian sniper team of 20 men called the "Ghosts of Bakhmut", claimed that they had killed 558 Russians during the battle so far, with their leader (callsign "Ghost") reportedly being responsible for 113 of them. They also claimed that only two of them had been wounded, with Ghost again being one of them.
On 19 August 2025, "Ghost" claimed that his snipers had "destroyed" more than a thousand Russian soldiers over the past year, and that one of them had "eliminated" two Russian servicemen at a distance of 4,000 metres.

As of January 2024, Ukrainian obituaries recorded the names of 7,644 Ukrainian servicemen killed during the battle of Bakhmut.

In April 2024, the Ukrainian Khortytsia Joint Task Force claimed that Russia had suffered "total losses", only in the eastern direction, of 24,156 personnel, 308 tanks, 671 armoured vehicles, 575 guns and mortars, 19 MLRs, 871 vehicles, plus various other equipment systems.

In May 2024, the Ukrainians claimed that Russian losses in the eastern direction were 25,665 personnel, 408 tanks, 814 AFVs, 816 guns and mortars, 26 MLRs, 1,363 vehicles, 79 anti-tank weapons, 5 heavy flamethrowers, 20 AA systems, 105 pieces of "special equipment", plus numerous other equipment types.

In June 2024, the Khortytsia group again reported on Russian losses in the east, claiming that they had "eliminated" 31,936 personnel, 342 enemy tanks, 592 armoured fighting vehicles, 1,084 guns and mortars, 13 MLRs, 1,302 other vehicles, 80 anti-tank weapons, 44 air defence systems, a heavy flamethrower system and one aircraft, plus various other weapons systems.

In July 2024, the Ukrainians claimed that Russian total losses were 31,748 soldiers (including 6,460 killed in a week between 15 and 22 July) in the eastern sector alone. Claimed equipment losses were 282 tanks, 608 AFVs, 1,121 guns and mortars, 14 MLRs, 5 heavy flamethrowers, 64 anti-tank weapons, 5 AA guns, 1,423 vehicles, 264 pieces of "special equipment" and 3 planes plus other equipment.

In August 2024, Ukraine claimed to have inflicted 32,988 casualties on the Russians that month, with 184 tanks, 502 AFVs, 1,143 artillery systems, 34 MLRs, 51 anti-tank weapons, 1,510 vehicles, 397 special equipments, 10 AA batteries, 2 heavy flamethrowers plus other equipment.

The ISW reported that Russian forces had suffered an estimated 80,110 casualties during intensified offensive efforts against Kupyansk in Kharkiv Oblast and Selydove, Kurakhove, and Vuhledar in Donetsk Oblast in September and October 2024, or "roughly 20,000 more casualties than US forces suffered during almost 20 years of operations in Iraq and Afghanistan". According to UK Defense Secretary John Healey, Russia lost 1,345 troops per day, or about 41,980 casualties, in October 2024, with 1,271 daily losses or about 38,130 casualties in September. Data compiled by Oryx indicates that Russian forces also lost 197 tanks, 661 armoured personnel carriers (APCs), and 65 artillery systems larger than 100mm, while they had seized and recaptured 1,517 square kilometres of territory, "an area less than a third the size of Delaware".

The Khortytsia group claimed that the Russians had suffered "colossal" losses of over 35,000 casualties in their operational zone during November 2024. The ISW reported that Ukrainian military observer Petro Chernyk claimed on 3 December that Russian forces are losing 1,700 troops per day and suffered 45,000 total casualties in November 2024 "as they attempted to maintain intensified offensive operations in eastern Ukraine". The UK MoD agreed with this assessment, claiming that Russian forces suffered an estimated 45,690 total casualties, suffering 1,523 casualties per day in November 2024 and just over 2,000 casualties in a single day for the first time on 28 November 2024. In addition, 307 Russian tanks, 899 combat vehicles, and 884 artillery systems were claimed to be destroyed. The ISW further reported that Russian forces had suffered an estimated 125,800 casualties "during a period of intensified offensive operations" in September, October, and November 2024 in exchange for 2,356 square kilometres of gains, "approximately 53 Russian casualties per square kilometer of Ukrainian territory seized".

On 3 December, LtCol Nazar Voloshyn claimed that Russian forces had lost 9,000 casualties and 40 tanks in eastern Ukraine over the previous week.

=== Civilian casualties ===
According to Lyudmyla Denisova, the Commissioner for Human Rights in Ukraine, four civilians were killed when a shell hit their home during the night of 9 March in the village of Slobozhanske, located in Izium Raion.

Russian shelling on Derhachi on 11 March reportedly killed three civilians.

On 14 March, two civilians were reportedly killed in Russian shelling on houses in Kharkiv, and a child was killed after Russian shelling hit a kindergarten in Chuhuiv. On 17 March, at least 21 people were reportedly killed following Russian shelling in Merefa.

== See also ==
- Northern Ukraine campaign
- Southern Ukraine campaign
- List of military engagements during the Russian invasion of Ukraine
