= Vasylivka (disambiguation) =

Vasylivka may refer to several places in Ukraine:

- Vasylivka Raion, one of five districts of Zaporizhzhia Oblast
  - Vasylivka, a city there and administrative center of the Raion
- Vasylivka, Berezanka settlement hromada, Mykolaiv Raion, Mykolaiv Oblast, a village
- Vasylivka, Ochakiv urban hromada, Mykolaiv Raion, Mykolaiv Oblast, a village
- Vasylivka, Bakhmut Raion, Donetsk Oblast, a village
- Vasylivka, Pokrovsk Raion, Donetsk Oblast, a village
- Vasylivka, Bolhrad Raion, Odesa Oblast, a village
- Vasylivka, Odesa Raion, Odesa Oblast, a village
- Vasylivka, Izmail Raion, Odesa Oblast, a village

== See also ==
- Dubovo-Vasylivka
- Orikhovo-Vasylivka
