= Yahidne =

Yahidne may refer to several populated places in Ukraine.

- Yahidne, Chernihiv Oblast
- Yahidne, Donetsk Oblast
