= 26th National Guard Battalion (Ukraine) =

26th Separate Battalion
- 26-й окремий батальйон НГ (Ukrainian)
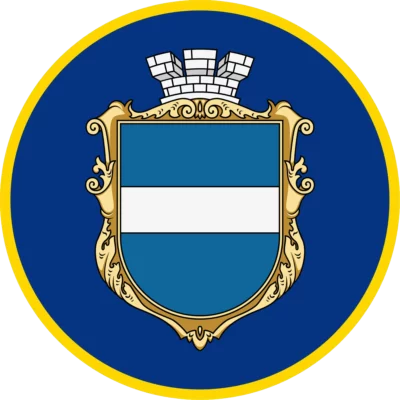
- Battalion Insignia
- Founded: 2000
- Country: Ukraine
- Allegiance: Ministry of Internal Affairs
- Branch: National Guard of Ukraine
- Type: Battalion
- Role: Multipurpose
- Part of: National Guard of Ukraine
- Garrison/HQ: Kremenchuk
- Engagements: Russo-Ukrainian war: War in Donbas; Russian invasion of Ukraine; Eastern Ukraine campaign; Battle of Kreminna; 2023 Ukrainian counteroffensive

Commanders
- Current commander: Lieutenant Colonel Dovhalyuk Oleg Pavlovich

The 26th National Guard Battalion is a battalion of the National Guard of Ukraine tasked with protection of public law and order and the protection of Ukrainian territorial integrity. It was established in 2000 and is garrisoned in Kremenchuk.

== History ==
It was established on 18 October 2000 in Kremenchuk as a part of the Internal Troops of Ukraine to control the situation and maintain public order in Kremenchuk and Molodizhne amidst increasing crime rates.

In 2014, it was transferred to the National Guard of Ukraine and took part in the War in Donbas.

During 2017, the Battalion saw three deployments in the ATO zone engaging in direct combat, protection of strategic objectives from UAVs and transport Protection in Volnovakha and Avdiivka. In July 2017, it was reported that the Battalion would be reformed into a regiment, which was officially confirmed in early 2018. On 26 September 2017, the Kremenchuk Technical Carbon Plant personnel repaired the barracks of the Battalion.

Following the Russian invasion of Ukraine, the Battalion took part in direct engagements with Russian troops in the beginning but gradually shifted their role to protection of important sites in Poltava Oblast.

It saw combat during the Eastern Ukraine campaign with a soldier (Yevhenii Kalish) being killed on 23 February 2023, in Kreminna, Luhansk Oblast.

On 23 March 2024, the guardsmen of the battalion downed a Russian UAV over Kremenchuk.

In 2025 26th battalion is reinforced to 37th Public Order Regiment.

== Structure ==
- 26th Separate Battalion
  - 1st Patrol Company
  - 2nd Patrol Company
  - 3rd Patrol Company
  - Automobile Company
  - Combat and Logistical Support Company
  - Cynological Group
  - Medical Center

== Commanders ==
- Colonel Viktor Mykolayovych Golovchenko (2001–2004)
- Lieutenant Colonel Oleksandr Vasyliovych Khomenko (2004–2009)
- Colonel Viktor Mykolayovych Golovchenko (2009–2010) (Note: Second Term)
- Colonel Oleksandr Genadiyovych Alenin (2010–2018)
- Lieutenant Colonel Shulga Evgeny Vyacheslavovych (2018–2020)
- Lieutenant Colonel Dovhalyuk Oleg Pavlovich (2020-)

== Sources ==
- "Штат військової частини 3059 розширять до рівня полку". kremen.today. Kremenchuk Today. 2017-07-07. Archived from the original on 10 July 2017.
- Батальйону Нацгвардії України в/ч 3059 на день народження подарували «Нісан»
- Територію для техніки отримали. КРЕМЕНЧУЦЬКІ НАЦГВАРДІЙЦІ ЗБІЛЬШУЮТЬ СВІЙ ШТАТ ДО ПОЛКУ
- Кременчук. День відкритих дверей в в/ч 3059
- Зустріч бійців ВЧ 3059 (НЧ_13_05_15)
- Кременчуцькі нацгвардійці знову відправляються в зону АТО — Громадське. Кременчук
- Бійці Нацгвардії повернулися зі Слов'янська до Кременчука — Кременчуцьке Громадське ТБ
