= 37th Public Order Brigade =

37th Public Order Regiment
- 37-й полк охорони громадського порядку НГУ (Ukrainian)
- Regiment Insignia
- Founded: 2025
- Country: Ukraine
- Allegiance: Ministry of Internal Affairs
- Branch: National Guard of Ukraine
- Type: Regiment
- Role: Law enforcement and Protection of Ukrainian territorial integrity
- Part of: National Guard of Ukraine
- Garrison/HQ: Kremenchuk
- Engagements: Russo-Ukrainian war: Russian invasion of Ukraine

The 37th Public Order Regement, Military Unit Number 3059, is a regiment of the National Guard of Ukraine tasked with law enforcement and protection of Ukrainian territorial integrity. It was established in 2025, reinforced from 26th Battalion.

This regiment is headquartered in Kremenchuk and has seen combat during the Russo-Ukrainian war on multiple occasions and is currently deployed on the frontlines.
