= Orikhovo-Vasylivka =

Orikhovo-Vasylivka Оріхово-Василівка
- Village
- Location within Donetsk Oblast Location within Ukraine
- Coordinates: 48°40′50″N 37°52′39″E
- Country: Ukraine
- Oblast: Donetsk Oblast
- Raion: Bakhmut Raion
- Hromada: Soledar urban hromada
- Elevation: 140 m (460 ft)

Population
  - Total: 227
- Postal code: 84532
- Area code: +380-6274

Orikhovo-Vasylivka (Ukrainian: Оріхово-Василівка) is a village located in Bakhmut Raion of Donetsk Oblast, Ukraine. It is located 11 kilometres (6.8 mi) northwest of Bakhmut.

On 19 July 2023, during the Russian invasion of Ukraine, the Ukrainian military claimed to have pushed out Russian forces from positions near the village. Russian forces claimed to have retaken the village on 9 February 2025.

== See also ==
- Dubovo-Vasylivka
- List of villages in Donetsk Oblast
