= Yahidne, Donetsk Oblast =

Yahidne Ягідне
- Rural settlement
- Location within Donetsk Oblast Location within Ukraine
- Coordinates: 48°37′37″N 37°58′37″E
- Country: Ukraine
- Oblast: Donetsk Oblast
- Raion: Bakhmut Raion
- Hromada: Bakhmut urban hromada

Population (2023)
  - Total: 1
- Website: Ягідне

Yahidne (Ukrainian: Ягідне) is a rural settlement in eastern Ukraine, located in the center of Bakhmut Raion, Donetsk Oblast. In 2001, it had a population of 318. It is located on one side of a hill, on the other side of which is the village of Berkhivka.

== History ==
=== Russo-Ukrainian War ===
==== Russian invasion of Ukraine ====
During the 2022 Russian invasion of Ukraine, Yahidne saw fierce fighting as part of the Battle of Bakhmut in February 2023. As of now, the settlement is currently under Russian occupation.

== Politics ==
In the 2012 and 2014 Ukrainian parliamentary elections, pluralities of voters in Yahidne voted for the pro-Russian parties Party of Regions and Opposition Bloc, respectively.

== Demographics ==
According to the 1989 USSR census, the settlement had a population of 420 people, of whom 192 were men and 228 were women.

By the time of the Ukrainian census of 2001, the population had shrunk to 318. Their native languages were:

Language	Number of speakers	%
Ukrainian	178	55.97 %
Russian	139	43.71 %
Belarusian	1	0.31 %
