= Dubovo-Vasylivka =

Dubovo-Vasylivka Дубово-Василівка
- Village
- Location within Donetsk Oblast Location within Ukraine
- Coordinates: 48°39′2″N 37°55′30″E
- Country: Ukraine
- Oblast: Donetsk Oblast
- Raion: Bakhmut Raion
- Hromada: Soledar urban hromada
- Elevation: 117 m (384 ft)

Population
  - Total: 13
- Postal code: 84532
- Area code: +380-6274

Dubovo-Vasylivka (Ukrainian: Дубово-Василівка) is a village located in Bakhmut Raion of Donetsk Oblast, Ukraine. It is located 6 kilometres (3.7 mi) northwest of Bakhmut.

== History ==
=== Russo-Ukrainian War ===
==== Russian invasion of Ukraine ====
On 9 March 2023, during the Russian invasion of Ukraine, Wagner Group leader Yevgeny Prigozhin claimed that his fighters completely captured the village. The capture of the village was later confirmed by DeepStateMap.Live.

== See also ==
- Orikhovo-Vasylivka
- List of villages in Donetsk Oblast
