= Battle of Vuhledar =

Battle in the Russo-Ukrainian war

- Part of the eastern front of the Russo-Ukrainian war
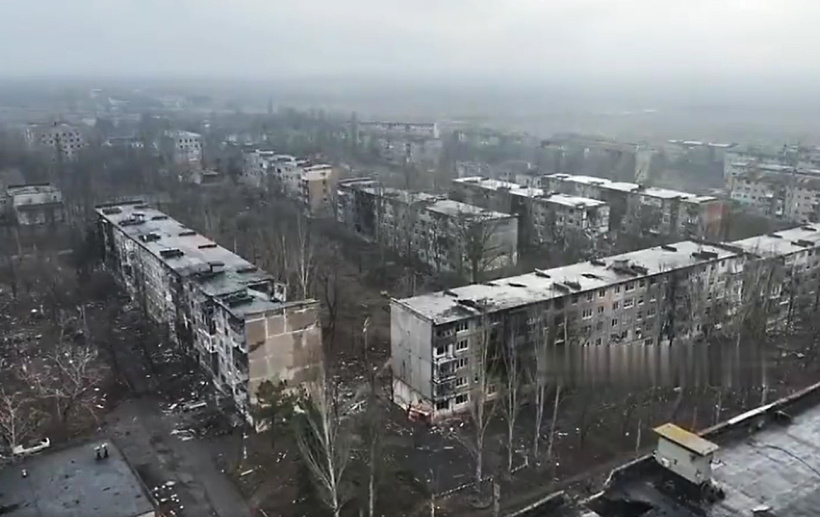
- Destruction in Vuhledar from fighting and shelling, September 2024
Date	28 October 2022 – 1 October 2024 (Note: The first main Russian assault in early 2023 was unsuccessful; small-scale assaults continued around Vuhledar through July 2024; a renewed large-scale offensive effort starting in August 2024 ended in Vuhledar's capture.) (1 year, 11 months and 3 days)
Location	Vuhledar, Donetsk Oblast, Ukraine 47°47′N 37°15′E
Result	Russian victory

Belligerents
Russia	Ukraine

Commanders and leaders
Rustam Muradov; Sukhrab Akhmedov; Mikhail Gudkov	Ivan Vinnik

Units involved
First main battle: 72nd Motorized Rifle Brigade; 5th Motorized Rifle Brigade; 155th Naval Infantry Brigade; 40th Naval Infantry Brigade; PMC Redut; PMC Patriot	First main battle: 72nd Mechanized Brigade; 68th Jaeger Brigade; Kastuś Kalinoŭski Regiment; Late 2024: 72nd Mechanized Brigade; 123rd Territorial Brigade

Strength
First main battle: 20,000 troops 90 main battle tanks 180 IFVs; 100 artillery pieces	Unknown

Casualties and losses
Ukrainian claim: 155th Brigade: ~5,000 killed, wounded or captured 130 armored vehicles destroyed (36 tanks); 72nd Brigade: 30 tanks and BMPs destroyed; 5th Brigade: 304 killed, 22 wounded; Per BBC Russia: 455–2,230+ killed, wounded and missing Identified by name: 155th Brigade: 211 killed, 42 missing; 40th Brigade: 72 killed; 72nd Brigade: 34 killed, 84+ wounded, 12+ missing; Equipment losses: 107+ armored vehicles damaged or destroyed (17+ tanks)	Ukrainian claim: "As many as" 60 killed or wounded a day (Sep. 2022 only); 100 killed or wounded (one battalion; Nov. '22–Feb. '23); Russian claim: 200 killed or wounded (24–25 Jan. 2023); Equipment losses: 20 armored vehicles destroyed (2 tanks; as of Feb. 2023)
- 60 civilians killed

During the Russo-Ukrainian war, the first main Russian effort to capture Vuhledar, a city in Donetsk Oblast, took place in the early months of 2023, following an advance through the surrounding area the preceding year. Ukrainian commanders described these clashes as "the largest tank battle" of the war to date. This assault in and around the city failed, with large-scale Russian losses and the dismissal of commander Rustam Muradov, who led the attack. Similarly unsuccessful small-scale attempts at advancing near the city were launched throughout 2023 and the first half of 2024.

In late August 2024, a renewed large-scale effort to capture Vuhledar was launched. Aided by the support of simultaneous advances on the city's southern, western, and eastern flanks, Russian forces near-encircled Vuhledar by late September, while storming the city itself. On 1 October, Vuhledar was captured.

== Background ==
In mid-March, during the 2022 Russian invasion of Ukraine, Ukraine's 53rd Mechanized Brigade was forced to retreat from the city of Volnovakha, falling back to the town of Vuhledar. On 21 June, the 53rd Brigade recaptured the village of Pavlivka, just south of Vuhledar, from a garrison comprising elements of Russia's 810th Naval Infantry Brigade and separatist forces.

== 2022 offensive on Pavlivka ==
In late October 2022, elements of Russia's 155th Naval Infantry Brigade launched an offensive on Pavlivka. Russian sources said that the assault had been launched on 28–29 October from positions south and east of Pavlivka, near the villages of Yehorivka and Mykilske, respectively.

Ukrainian sources, Russian sources, and the Institute for the Study of War speculated that the offensive at Pavlivka was launched with the goal of encircling Ukrainian troops near Vuhledar. Units of Russia's Pacific Fleet simultaneously conducted assaults near the village of Novomykhailivka, northeast of Vuhledar; it was suggested by Russian sources that these assaults were part of the same offensive to encircle the town. On 1 November, a Russian source claimed that the assaults near Novomykhailivka had resulted in "no significant progress".

Russian sources variously claimed in the end of October that Pavlivka had come under partial or complete Russian control, but geolocated footage indicated that the village remained Ukrainian-held as of early November. In the beginning of November, Russian sources said the fighting at Pavlivka had slowed and had devolved into "small positional battles". Throughout early November, it was repeatedly claimed by Ukrainian and Russian sources that poor weather conditions in the area were hindering Russian assaults.

By 10 November, Russian sources claimed that Russian forces had entered Pavlivka and that Ukrainian troops had withdrawn to the northern part of the village. The next day, Russian sources claimed that the village had fully come under Russian control. Russian sources claimed that on 13 and 14 November, units of Russia's 155th and 40th Naval Infantry Brigades and the Kaskad Battalion killed or captured Ukrainian personnel who were unable to withdraw from Pavlivka. On 14 November, Russia's ministry of defense announced that the village had come under Russian control, and said three days later that Russian forces had taken full control over the road between Pavlivka and Mykilske. However, geolocated footage published on 23 November showed that some Ukrainian forces remained within Pavlivka.

According to David Axe of Forbes, by 4 November, Russia's 155th Brigade and 40th Naval Infantry Brigade had suffered as many as 300 casualties during the assaults on Pavlivka. Members of the 155th Brigade published a letter criticizing commander Rustam Muradov and calling the offensive on Pavlivka "incomprehensible". According to Nazarii Kishak, a commander in Ukraine's 72nd Brigade on the frontline in Vuhledar, his unit, the 48th Battalion, managed to kill 11 Russians on 26 December, compared with 400 within four days the previous month. Other Ukrainian commanders in the area expressed concern about the stability of the town's defense, as local doctors received up to 60 Ukrainian casualties a day. The same source also claimed that the Russians were using a 2S4 Tyulpan self-propelled heavy mortar, which, at 240mm, is the largest currently in use.

== First main battle (24 January – 15 February 2023) ==
The largest assault on Vuhledar throughout the war began on the night of 24 January 2023. On 25 January, war correspondent Andriy Rudenko stated that Ukrainian troops had lost the first line of defence near the town and withdrawn to the city. DNR spokesman Daniil Bezsonov claimed that members of the Russian 155th Naval Infantry Brigade had participated in an advance.

Localized offensives took place by Russian forces on 25 January, although British intelligence assessed it was unlikely that these assaults were able to hold any ground. The spokesman for the Ukrainian Eastern Command, Serhii Cherevatyi, claimed Russian troops fired at Vuhledar 322 times on 26 January, with 58 localized battles taking place. Ukrainian troops also repulsed Russian attacks on the western part of the town on January 26, although Russian forces consolidated some positions around the eastern half. Cherevatyi also claimed 109 Russian troops were killed and 188 were wounded. That same day, Belarusian volunteer and activist Eduard Lobau was killed in action fighting near Vuhledar.

On 27 January, Russian forces bombarded Vuhledar with a TOS-1 thermobaric rocket launcher. In the following days, Russian forces suffered heavy casualties during the battle, with the 155th Naval Infantry Brigade taking the brunt of the losses. By January 31, British intelligence claimed Russian advances in Vuhledar were unlikely to make any additional progress.

According to Austrian-based analyst Tom Cooper from 2 February, the 155th Marine Brigade may have lost 200-230 men killed in action over the first three days of the operation, with the Ukrainians claiming to have shot down 5-6 Ka-52 helicopters between 24 and 28 January. He even mentioned a rumor "that all the involved Russian units suffered 'up to 20,000 casualties' (KIA, WIA, MIA) over the last week". However, Cooper regarded the latter to be "wildly exaggerated", and believed that a strike on 1,500 Russian reinforcements gathered in a single building in the nearby village of Kyryoovka (which reportedly inflicted 'hundreds' of casualties) may have caused the above reports of massive Russian losses in the Vuhledar area.

In early February, videos emerged from Vuhledar alleging to show a destroyed Russian column near the town. A Russian assault around 6 February saw 30 tanks and other heavy weapons destroyed by Ukrainian artillery. In an interview by RFE/RL, relatives of killed soldiers stated that many Tatar volunteers from the Alga Battalion were killed in the 6 February attack. These heavy losses saw the main fighting units in Vuhledar become the 72nd Motor Rifle Brigade, composed predominantly of Tatars. The town's deputy mayor, Maksym Verbovsky, stated that Russian troops were attempting to surround the town from two sides, having advanced to nearby villages although being forced to fall back by Ukrainian defenses.

A Russian offensive was initiated against the Ukrainian defensive line during the second week of February. On 8 February, an offensive of tanks, infantry fighting vehicles (IFVs), and infantry failed with large losses, including the loss of nearly 30 armored vehicles, IFVs and tanks. The Ukrainian military announced almost the entire Russian 155th Naval Infantry Brigade was destroyed and that Russia lost 130 units of equipment, including 36 tanks. In the same announcement, they also claimed that the Russians were losing 150-300 marines killed per day in the battle. General Rustam Muradov, commander of the Eastern Military District and of the Vuhledar offensive came under fire for the failure to achieve the objective. On 13 February, a Russian soldier from the 3rd Company of the 155th Brigade said that 500 soldiers had been killed during one assault, and that he was one of only eight survivors from his 100-man company. On 15 February, Ben Wallace, the British Secretary of State for Defence, said that over 1,000 Russian troops had been killed over just two days, and that an entire Russian brigade had effectively been "annihilated". In a video appeal to Russian President Vladimir Putin published on 25 March 2023, around 20 members of a unit tasked with assaulting Vuhledar, identified as the Storm Squad, the 5th Brigade of the 1st Corps of the Russian 8th Army, claimed that their commanders were utilizing anti-retreat troops to force them to advance. They stated that up to 304 of its members had been killed, including the company's commander, and that 22 had been wounded.

== February 2023 – July 2024 clashes ==
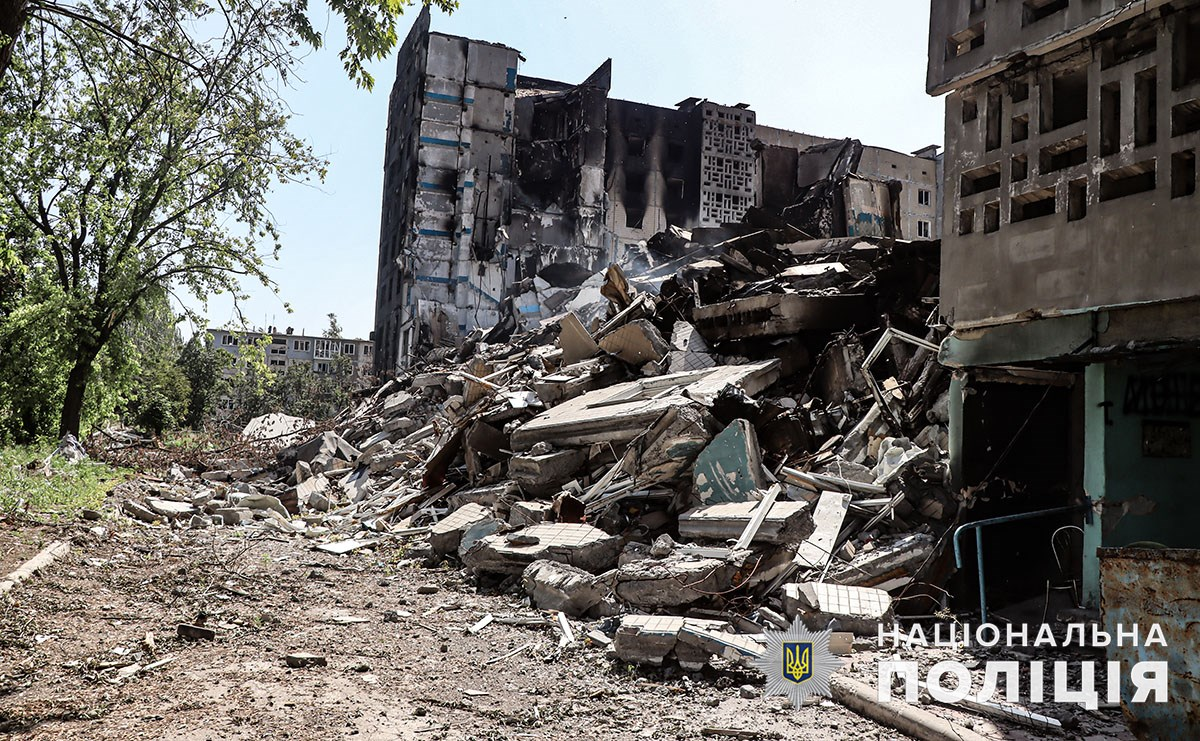
Destroyed buildings in Vuhledar, August 2023

The American Institute for the Study of War (ISW) assessed that between 15 and 23 February, Russian forces continued to launch assaults on Vuhledar, although with no significant territorial changes. The ISW also claimed elements of the 155th Naval Infantry Brigade refused to participate in some assaults. By late February, Russian troops had lost so many tanks and vehicles from the first battle that they shifted towards infantry attacks on the town. Speaking to the New York Times, Vladislav Bayak, a commander in the 72nd Mechanized Brigade, claimed many Ukrainian counterattacks are done through ambushing the Russian vehicles using drones or waiting until the tanks are within range of Ukrainian anti-tank missiles.

In March 2023, British intelligence claimed Russian military leadership had not abandoned the prospect of capturing Vuhledar, and that a second large offensive was plausible. On 14 March, a Ukrainian soldier found a notebook apparently belonging to an as-yet unnamed Russian officer. The notebook seemed to provide a daily tally of manpower in a battalion-size assault group. A hundred soldiers attacked Ukrainian positions on 2 March, according to the notes. Just 16 came back. Two days later, 116 Russians attacked. Twenty-three survived. On 4 March, 103 soldiers left their bivouac. Just 15 came back. The next day, out of 115 attackers, three returned. According to the notes, that single Russian formation lost 377 troops in just a few days.

On 3 April The Moscow Times reported that the Russian general in charge of the Vuhledar offensive, Rustam Muradov, had been dismissed. The British Ministry of Defence at the time described the event as the "most senior Russian military dismissal of 2023".

On 15 April, Ukrainian Brigadier General Oleksandr Tarnavskyi posted a photo of at least four destroyed Russian tanks near Vuhledar. Along with the picture, he stated that "Orcs [Russian troops] are resting [i.e., lying dead – ed.] near Vuhledar. Defence forces are holding positions near the town and preventing the enemy from approaching [the city of – ed.] Avdiivka. Our artillery is working precisely, and every soldier in the foxholes performs at the highest level." On 21 April, Ukrainian Commander-in-Chief Valerii Zaluzhnyi described how his forces had again defeated the 155th Separate Marine Brigade, and that the Ukrainian 35th Marine and 56th Brigades had captured more than twenty Russian marines during a counterattack. Between 26 and 28 April, Ukrainian forces claimed to have destroyed at least four T-80 and T-72 tanks near Nevel's'ke, a town just 20 miles south of Vuhledar.

In May 2023, Ukrainian soldiers on the frontline near Vuhledar stated that Ukrainian forces in the area were lacking in heavy weapons, and Russian forces still held a numerical advantage in terms of troops and weaponry. Around this same time, the British Ministry of Defense stated the Russian 155th Separate Marine Brigade had "likely been reduced to combat-ineffective status."

On 2 November 2023, the 155th Marine Brigade again attempted an assault on Vuhledar, and was defeated by the Ukrainian 72nd Brigade. Casualties were reportedly heavy, with perhaps a thousand Russian lives lost, along with 60 vehicle losses (including T-72B3 and T-80BV tanks) compared to 17 vehicles lost by the Ukrainians in a single day.

On 10 March 2024, Ukrainian forces claimed to have repulsed a column of Russian vehicles.

On 4 May 2024, the Ukrainians published photos of 32 damaged or destroyed Russian vehicles following an assault by the 5th Tank Brigade, the 37th Motorized Rifle Brigade, and the 40th Naval Infantry Brigade. While the exact date of the attack was unspecified, it was likely close to the date of publishing, as some of the vehicles were "turtle tanks", which Russia only started to use in the weeks preceding May.

On 28 June 2024, Ukrainian forces destroyed a Russian column in Vuhledar, which had attacked and failed to cut off the defending 72nd Mechanized Brigade. The brigade claimed to have knocked out 16 T-80 tanks, 34 fighting vehicles and 19 motorcycles, and to have killed or badly wounded over 800 Russian troops in the assault.

== Renewed offensive efforts and capture (August–October 2024) ==
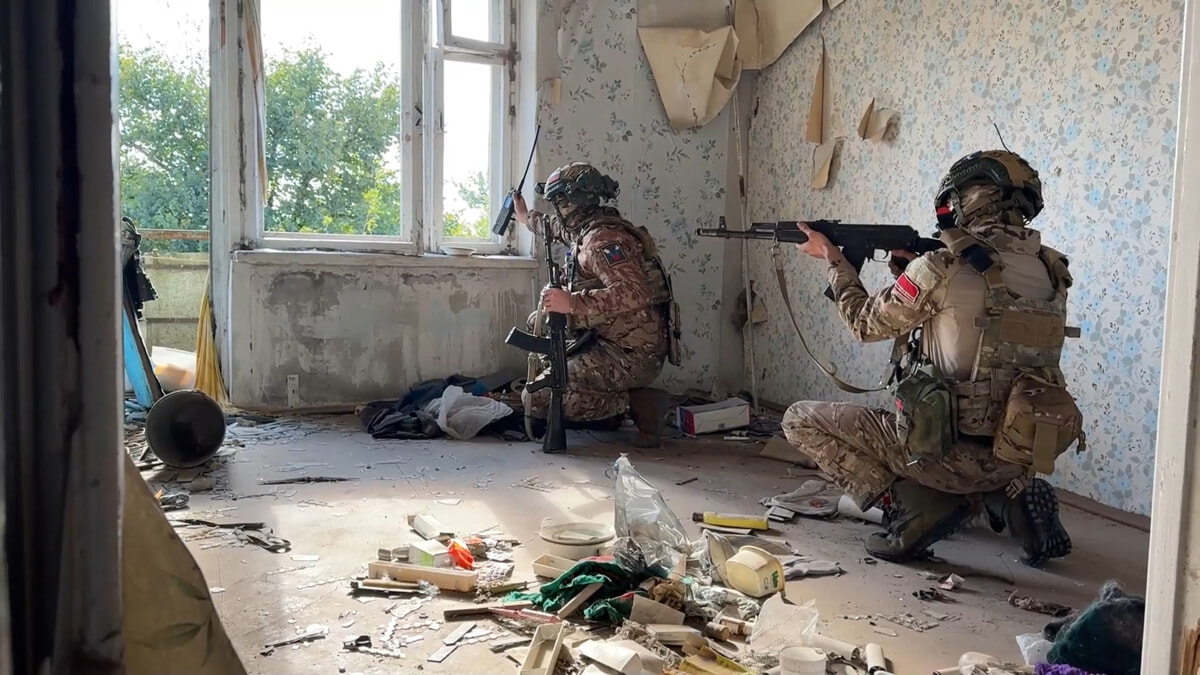
Russian soldiers in Vuhledar

In late August 2024, Russia restarted offensive operations towards Vuhledar, with bombardments of the city increasing significantly while large armored assaults were launched in the city's direction. The defending 72nd Mechanized Brigade said that these attacks "were among the most intense and firepower-heavy in more than a year". Russian sources claimed that Russian forces were able to seize positions around the Coal Mine No. 1 northeast of Vuhledar by 1 September.

By 3 September, Russian forces had reportedly captured Prechystivka, west of Vuhledar, after a column of armored vehicles advanced into the village, and advanced into Vodiane, northeast of Vuhledar. Russian sources said the advances were part of an attempted envelopment of Ukrainian soldiers in Vuhledar. Russian forces captured Vodiane on 8 September, bringing them closer to Vuhledar from the northeast. Some of the defending soldiers in Vuhledar were reportedly transferred to the front near Pokrovsk.

The deputy commander of the 72nd Mechanized Brigade complained to war correspondents that his troops lacked air defences and were "exhausted" because they had had zero rotations since February 2022.

By 22 September, the threat of encirclement had deepened for the Ukrainian troops stationed in Vuhledar as Russian forces continued to advance on the city from all directions, taking hold of the last entryway to the city. A Ukrainian military analyst stated that Vuhledar "is practically surrounded" and "could fall in a matter of days". Russian forces began storming Vuhledar in the ensuing days, entering the city itself from the east, and ramped up glide bomb attacks on the city. The commander of the 72nd Mechanized Brigade was meanwhile transferred to a different position amidst a worsening situation for the brigade in Vuhledar.

Further advances along the western flank of Vuhledar northeast from Prechystivka and north from Pavlivka allowed Russian forces to simultaneously enter the city from the west by 30 September, further pressuring and threatening to fully encircle the remaining Ukrainian troops in central Vuhledar. A Ukrainian soldier defending the city spoke of dwindling supplies and sustenance and how the near-encirclement of the city had necessitated using small groups of soldiers to flee Vuhledar, and that these actions were costly in casualties. Kyiv Post reported that soldiers of the 123rd Territorial Brigade, sent to reinforce the 72nd Mechanized Brigade, deserted their positions, causing a negative effect on morale.

On 1 October, the head of the Donetsk Oblast Military Administration, Vadym Filashkin, reported that Russian troops were fighting in the city center. The city was captured the same day. The Ukrainian Khortytsia group of forces announced withdrawal the next day. On 2 October, the Commander of the Ukrainian 123rd Brigade defending Vuhledar, Ihor Hryb was reported dead; an investigation was launched to determine the cause of his death, which was preliminary reported as suicide. The Russian Ministry of Defense officially announced the capture of the city on 3 October.

== Aftermath ==
Following the capture of Vuhledar, Russian forces exploited the city's fall to make significant advances north and northwest of it; the settlements of Bohoiavlenka, Novoukrainka, Yasna Poliana, Shakhtarske, and Maksymivka were captured in late October to early November 2024.

=== Impact ===
In February 2023, Deputy Mayor Verbovsky stated that Vuhledar "was destroyed", with "one hundred percent of the buildings damaged;" fewer than 500 civilians, and only one child, remained in the town once populated with 15,000 residents. The town no longer had running water or electricity because of the damage inflicted on it, with civilians being forced to collect rainwater to drink in February.

On 26 March 2023, Russian media reported that Muradov was demoted from his position as Commander of Eastern Military District. While this news was not officially confirmed by the Russian government, head of Russian military analysis channel Rybar, Mikhail Zvinchuk, stated that Muradov had been given a vacation that is "almost tantamount to resignation". Following this, Russian war correspondents claimed that he had been replaced as acting commander of the Eastern Military District by Lieutenant General Andrey Kuzmenko, despite officially remaining at its head.

A May 2023 report by ReliefWeb stated that Vuhledar urban hromada, an administrative unit that contains Vuhledar and four other nearby villages, had only 1,100 civilians left out of a pre-war population of 26,000. Most of the civilians are elderly, and all services like food, water, electricity, and healthcare are nonexistent. In June, RadioFreeEurope reported 60 civilians, including three children were killed since fighting began in Vuhledar.

On 26 October 2023, the Institute for the Study of War, an American-based think-tank, assessed that Russian armored losses around Vuhledar prevented the Russian command from committing to sustained mechanized assaults elsewhere in Ukraine in the spring and winter of 2023.

== Analysis ==
Vuhledar is situated on a height above the operationally significant T0509 highway between Velyka Novosilka and Novotroitske, and is key to fire control of the highway.

Ukrainian officials have called the battle of Vuhledar "the biggest tank battle of the war", with over 130 Russian tanks and APCs being damaged or destroyed in the course of the battle. Analysts believed many of the Russian casualties and loss of equipment stemmed from the makeup of the Russian brigades, being predominantly untrained mobilized recruits. Military experts told the Wall Street Journal that the heavy Russian losses indicated that the soldiers likely lacked autonomy to adapt to events on the battlefield, possibly combined with poor training of recently mobilized troops.

The Daily Telegraph declared the Russian victory in the battle to be the most significant since the capture of Avdiivka in February 2024.

== See also ==
- List of military engagements during the Russo-Ukrainian war (2022–present)
- Timeline of the Russo-Ukrainian war (12 November 2022 – 7 June 2023)
- Battle of Marinka (2022–2023)
- Battle of Avdiivka (2023–2024)
