= 74th Reconnaissance Battalion (Ukraine) =

Ukrainian military volunteer unit

- 74-й окремий розвідувальний батальйон
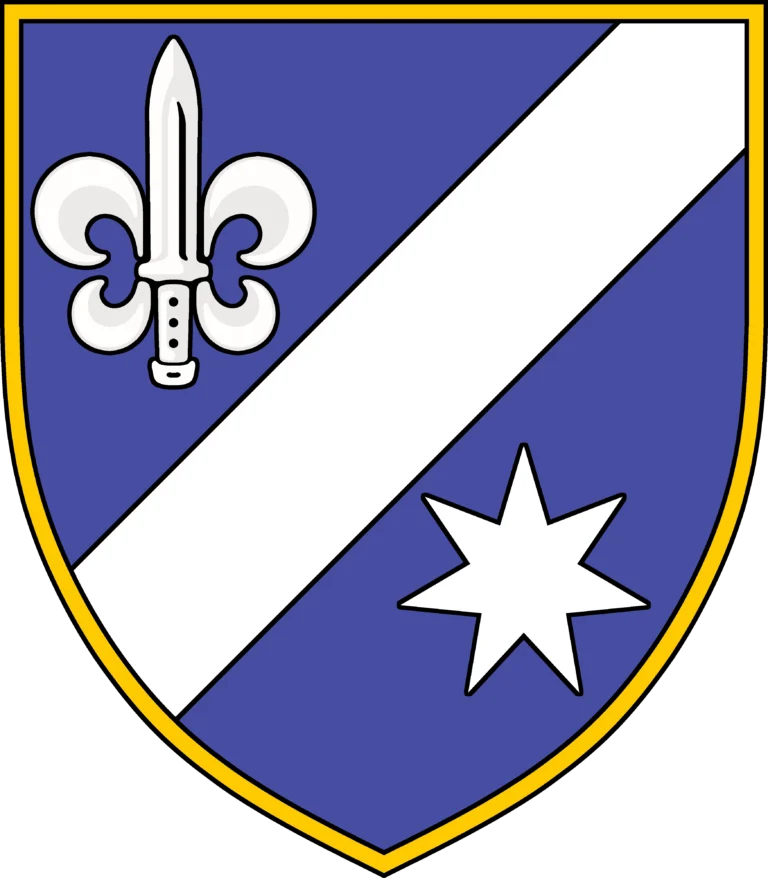
- Battalion's insignia
- Founded: 2005
- Country: Ukraine
- Allegiance: Armed Forces of Ukraine
- Branch: Ukrainian Ground Forces
- Type: Spetsnaz
- Role: Reconnaissance, counteroffensive and sabotage
- Part of: Operational Command East
- Garrison/HQ: Cherkaske, Dnipropetrovsk Oblast
- Engagements: Russo-Ukrainian War; War in Donbass; 2022 Russian invasion of Ukraine

Insignia
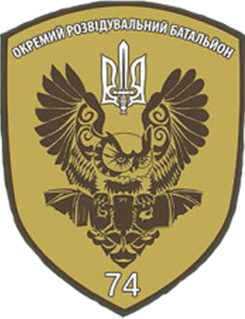
- Former Insignia

The 74th Separate Reconnaissance Battalion (MUN A1035) is a battalion of the Ukrainian ground forces acting as an independent unit subordinated directly to the Operational Command East and has seen combat during both the War in Donbass and the Russo-Ukrainian war, performing reconnaissance and combat operations throughout the entire front.

== History ==
It was established as a separate reconnaissance battalion in 2005 as a part of the Operational Command East.

Since 2014, it has been partaking in the War in Donbass. In September 2014, the fighters of the 74th Battalion were deployed to Marinka following the Battle of Ilovaisk as one of the units arbitrarily left its positions and the gap had to be reinforced by reconnaissance units. The area under the operational control of the battalion stretched from Marinka through Novomykhailivka and Slavne to Taramchuk, covering 25 kilometers of the frontlines. They were armed only with assault rifles, machine guns and one BMP which was moved frequently to give an illusion about a large number of vehicles being present, without armored and artillery support. The Separatists planned to launch a full-scale offensive from Oleksandrivka but were repelled everytime as they started to deploy their DRGs. During the deployment in Marinka, a soldier of the battalion, Drobnyy Denis Yevhenovych died on 5 September 2014 as a result of a landmine explosion while returning to base as part of a reconnaissance group. Another soldier, Chelyada Oleksandr Oleksandrovich died on 26 September 2014 from shrapnel wounds while repelling a separatist attack.

The battalion then volunteered to be deployed to take part in the Second Battle of Donetsk Airport arriving in mid-October 2014 and took up positions in the New Terminal being rotated every 10–15 days via armored personnel carriers. The battalion was tasked primarily with adjusting artillery fire. On 18 November 2014, a soldier of the battalion, Polyansky Ilya Anatoliyovych was killed at the Donetsk airport by a separatist sniper. On 21 November 2014, while performing a reconnaissance mission near Donetsk airport, a soldier of the battalion, Baydyuk Volodymyr Ivanovych was blown up by a landmine and died. On 30 November 2014, a soldier of the battalion, Sholodko Ihor Vasyliovych was killed during a separatist assault.

A soldier of the battalion, Zhyvodyor Oleksandr Mykolayovych died on 14 December 2014, while on duty in Kurakhove.

In January 2015, together with soldiers of the 25th Airborne Brigade, the 74th reconnaissance battalion was preparing to seize the tower, but the strike force was destroyed by separatists, so the operation had to be called off. A few days later, separatists blew up the terminal forcing everyone to retreat. During these engagements, on 15 January 2015, a soldier of the battalion, Kasyanov Sergey Alekseevich died as a result of wounds sustained during a massive separatist assault. On 20 January 2015, another soldier of the Battalion, Ishchenko Serhiy Mykhailovych was killed in an engagement at the new airport terminal.

It was then deployed to take part in operations in Krasnohorivka, Marinka, Horlivka and Avdiivka, successfully being able to capture separatist DRGs.

On 17 July 2015, a soldier of the battalion, Shuba Yuriy Grigorovich was killed in combat near Berezove. On 5 August 2015, three soldiers of the Battalion, Shapoval Oleksandr Serhiyovych, Lyanka Maksym Yuriyovych and Rostoropsha Viktor Viktorovych were killed as a result of a landmine explosion near Karlivka.

In early February 2016, the battalion was among the first to take control of the industrial zone of Avdiivka, performing reconnaissance and other operations. On 18 June 2016, near Luhanske an officer of the Battalion, Lobov Sergey Nikolaevich and a soldier Andrushchenko Mykola Anatoliyovych were killed as a result of an explosion of an anti-personnel mine.

On 26 January 2017, a soldier of the battalion, Ksenchuk Andriy Serhiyovych was killed as a result of shelling by separatists using 120mm mortars near Shyrokyne. On 10 June 2017, after having successfully repelled an enemy attack, Ukrainian forces stopped separatist advances in Pavlopil, prompting separatists to launch a mortar attack killing two soldiers of the battalion, Dovgal Anatoly Oleksandrovych and Goro Serhiy Petrovych. On 30 November 2017, a soldier of the Battalion, Kavun Andriy Ivanovich was wounded in the area of responsibility of the separate tactical group "Donetsk" and died of his injuries on 4 December.

On 27 June 2019, a soldier of the battalion, Kolodyazhny Oleksandr Leonidovych was seriously wounded while performing a combat mission in the Marinka, to capture Volodymyr Tsemakh, a separatist commander involved in the Malaysia Airlines Flight 17 shootdown. He died of his wounds on 11 July 2019. On 15 August 2019, two soldiers of the battalion, Kostyantyn Mykolayovych Gavryk and Popko Oleksiy Olegovich were killed while performing Combat operations in Pisky. On 14 September 2019, an officer of the battalion, Major Mykhailo Vasylevich Tsymbalisty was killed by a sniper near Pisky.

On 24 August 2021, a soldier 9f the battalion, Pitko Vyacheslav Pavlovych was killed in a Separatist attack at an observation post near Novomykhailivka. On 27 August 2021, a soldier of the battalion, Vyskrebets Andriy Viktorovych was killed by a sniper during a reconnaissance mission in Slavne. On 11 September 2021 at a command and observation post near Novohnativka, a soldier of the battalion, Herman Denys Serhiyovych was killed as a result of separatist artillery strikes.

It has seen combat against Russian forces following the 2022 Russian invasion of Ukraine, firstly during the Siege of Mariupol employing armored vehicles to stop Russian convoys. In 2023, the battalion received Shark UAVs.

== Support ==
The battalion is heavily supported by the Basketball club BC Dnipro which has provided it with weapons and equipment.

== Structure ==
- Management & Headquarters
- 1st Reconnaissance Company
- 2nd Reconnaissance Company
- Long Range Reconnaissance Company
- UAV Reconnaissance Company
- Fire Support Company
- Maintenance Platoon
- Logistics Platoon
- Commandant Platoon
- Medical Center

== Sources ==
- «Кіборги» підняли прапор України і звернулися до сепаратистів
- Військові частини Сухопутних військ за родами військ
- М.Жирохов Під знаком кажана: бойовий шлях 74-го окремого розвідувального батальйону
- Офіційний сайт: http://74-orb.com/
- 74 окремий розвідувальний батальйон
