= Russian winter offensive in Ukraine (2022–2023) =

Military operation during the Russian invasion of Ukraine

Russian Winter Offensive in Ukraine (2022–2023)
- Part of the Russian invasion of Ukraine
- Zones of control in Ukraine as of 22 August 2026
Date	2022–2023 (1 year)
Location	Ukraine
Result	Russian strategic failure
Territorial changes	Russian forces capture Bakhmut and Soledar but fail to advance further

Belligerents
Russia	Ukraine

Casualties and losses
Heavy; 20,000 killed (US claim)	Heavy

The Russian Winter Offensive of 2022–2023 was a military campaign executed by the Russian Armed Forces during the Russian invasion of Ukraine. On 22 December 2022, Chief of the General Staff of the Russian Federation Valery Gerasimov announced that the Russian military would focus on capturing the remainder of Donetsk Oblast. In early February 2023, Russian troops began their winter offensive on the western section of the front in Donetsk Oblast and on the Kupiansk–Svatove–Kreminna–Lyman line. According to military experts, Russia wanted to quickly break through Ukrainian defenses and seize the Donetsk Oblast. However, the Russian offensive was slow, and according to American and British intelligence estimates, in the winter of 2023 the Russian army managed to achieve only minor progress at the cost of huge losses of its own. However, analysts from the West noted that Ukraine also suffered significant losses among military personnel and equipment.

== Background ==
In the fall of 2022, the Ukrainian Armed Forces successfully launched the Kherson and Kharkiv counteroffensives, evicting Russian troops from the western bank of the Dniepr River and large sections of Kharkiv Oblast. Subsequently, a relative stalemate took place on all fronts, during which both sides regrouped their forces and prepared new offensives. Simultaneously, journalists noted that the Donbas region was a relatively favorable place for Russia to attack. This was due to the established system of logistics and fortifications in areas controlled by the People's Republics of Donetsk and Luhansk. Additionally, seizing and annexing those republics was a core war goal for the Kremlin. In November 2022, British Secretary of State for Defence Ben Wallace called on Ukraine to continue its offensive during the winter months: “Given the advantage the Ukrainians have in training, equipment, and quality of fighting manpower against the demoralised, poorly trained, poorly equipped Russians, it is in Ukraine’s interests to maintain the momentum over the winter.”

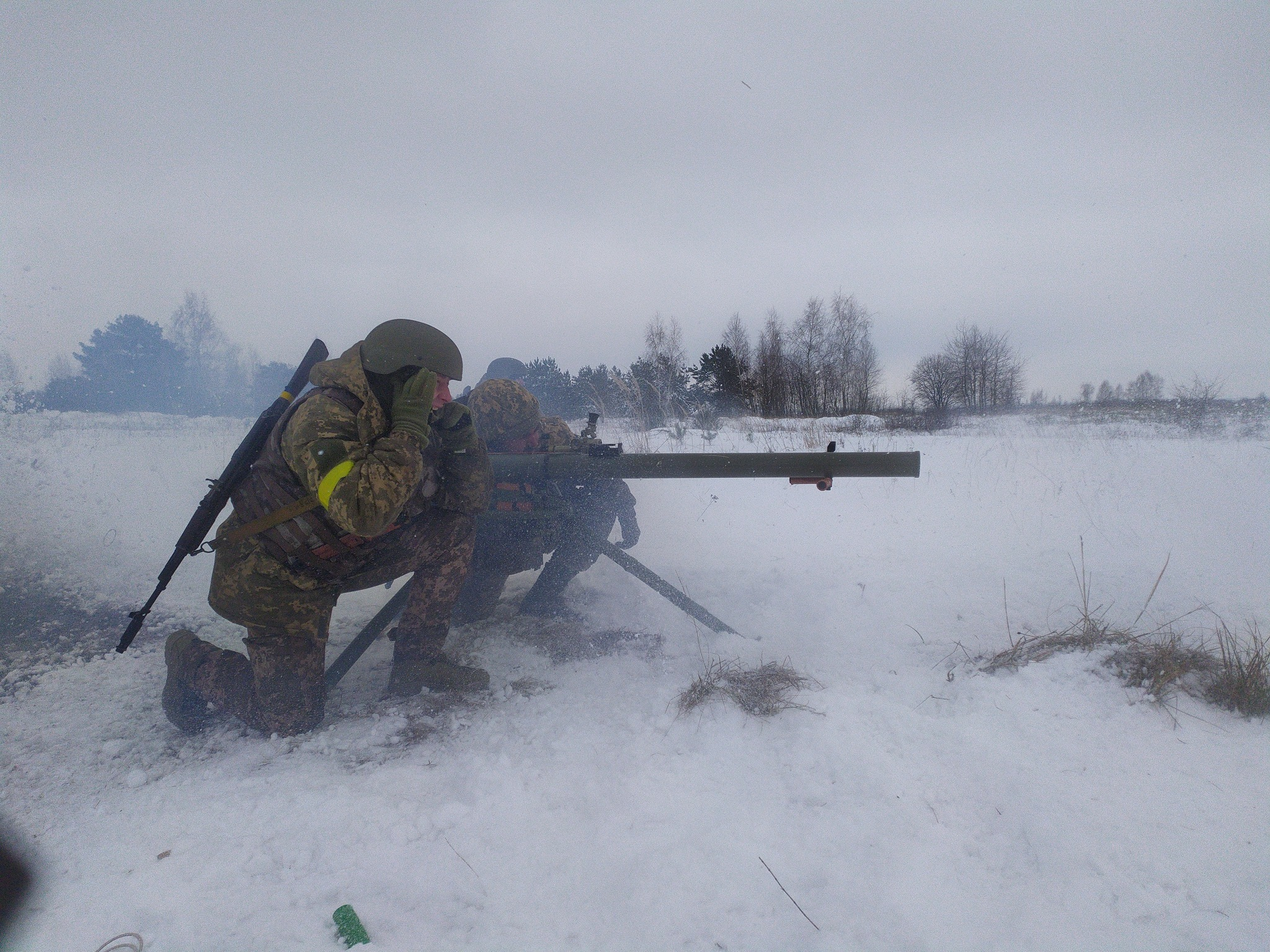
Ukrainian soldiers of the Territorial Defense Forces with an ATGL-H mounted grenade launcher, December 2022.

== Course of events ==
=== Donbas ===
Russian–occupied territories as of January 2023.

In the winter of 2022–2023, the Ukrainian Armed Forces decided to carry out a strategic defense, conducting only local attacks in the vicinity of Kreminna in Luhansk Oblast. However, Ukraine's offensive actions in the Kreminna area were not particularly successful. According to the Governor of Luhansk Oblast (at that time Serhiy Haidai), one of the main problems for Ukrainian forces in the Kreminna area were large-scale attacks by Russian troops. In mid-winter, Russian forces, reinforced by mobilization, attempted an offensive near Kreminna. However, Russian forces also did not have much success, and by the end of winter, the major battles in this area of the front had become stalemates.

Although active in various parts of the front, Russian forces focused their efforts on capturing the remainder of Donetsk Oblast under Ukrainian control. On 16 December 2022, the ISW wrote that the Russians could be preparing an offensive in Donbas in the winter. ISW wrote that with the onset of cold weather, Russia intensified offensive action along the entire front line in Donetsk and Luhansk Oblasts and noted problems with the combat readiness of Russian troops. British Admiral Tony Radakin stated: “Russia is facing an acute shortage of artillery ammunition. There is no mystery about this. Putin planned a 30-day war, but Russian guns have been firing for almost 300 days.”

On 22 December 2022, Chief of the General Staff of the Russian Federation Valery Gerasimov announced that the Russian army would focus on capturing Donetsk Oblast. On January 11, 2022, Gerasimov was promoted to commander of the joint group of Russian forces in Ukraine, replacing Sergey Surovikin. Shortly thereafter, Russian forces under his command emerged victorious during the Battle of Soledar, northeast of the Ukrainian city of Bakhmut.

On February 6, 2023, the British Financial Times, citing “very reliable intelligence” from sources in the Ukrainian Armed Forces, wrote that the Russian army would launch a large–scale offensive in the areas of the cities of Kreminna and Lyman over the next ten days. Ukrainian President Volodymyr Zelenskyy also spoke about a new possible Russian offensive on 5 February.

The largest and longest engagement of the campaign was the Battle of Bakhmut, during which Russian troops seized the city at the cost of heavy casualties (see Military Casualties during the Battle of Bakhmut). The primary Russian assault troops in this direction were military contractors from the PMC Wagner led by Yevgeny Prigozhin and included hundreds of prisoners recruited from jails within Russia. Unlike the regular Russian armed forces, which actively used armored vehicles, the Wagner assault squads primarily conducted dismounted ground attacks, in part explaining significant Russian losses during the battle. At the onset of the battle, artillery operated by Wagner mercenaries sought to suppress Ukrainian positions and facilitate the advance of dismounted assault groups. Ukrainian forces repelled these attacks, during which Wagner fighters frequently targeted Ukrainian positions with grenade launchers and mortars. Throughout the battle, various groups of Wagner fighters were coordinated by their commanders using UAVs. By March 2023, Russian forces managed to capture Soledar and a number of adjacent villages, nearly encircling a large number of Ukrainian troops in Bakhmut and Siversk.

The Russian winter offensive also took place in Avdiivka, where Ukrainian and Russian forces had been engaged in fierce clashes since early 2022. Between late 2023 and early 2024, Russian forces managed to capture the town at the cost of heavy losses. Fierce battles also took place in Marinka, and by March 2023 the city was completely destroyed. Marinka was also eventually captured by the Russians.

In late January 2023, Russian forces launched an offensive on the Ukrainian stronghold of Vuhledar. The attack ultimately failed, but clashes in the area continued, and the city was ultimately captured by Russian troops in August 2024. During the battle, Russian armor entered Ukrainian anti-tank minefields and was fired upon by Ukrainian artillery, with some Russian vehicles destroyed by ATGMs. According to Oryx, during the offensive on Vuhledar and Avdiivka from 8 to 10 February, the Russian Armed Forces lost 103 vehicles, including 36 tanks, while Ukraine, according to their data, lost five times less during the same period (20 vehicles, including two tanks). Journalists from the BBC Russian Service wrote that, judging by reports from Russian pro-war Telegram channels, units of the 40th Separate Marine Brigade, the 155th Guards Naval Infantry Brigade, the 36th Separate Guards Motor Rifle Brigade, and the DPR battalion “Kaskad” took part in the Battle of Vuhledar.

Representatives of the Ukrainian Armed Forces called the three-week Battle of Vuhledar the largest tank battle of the Russian invasion of Ukraine up to that point. As a result of these battles, the Russians abandoned frontal attacks on the city with armored vehicles, switching to limited infantry attacks. By the end of winter 2023, Vuhledar turned into a secondary area of combat operations until the summer of 2024.

=== Kherson and Kharkiv ===
Ukrainian territory never occupied Ukrainian territory liberated from occupation Russian-occupied territory in Ukraine

After the partial withdrawal of Russian forces from areas of Kherson Oblast during Ukraine's 2022 Kherson counteroffensive, the front line in this area stabilized along the Dnieper. The task of fighting along the Dnieper, given the destroyed bridges across the river in this area and the unreliability of ferry or pontoon crossings, proved difficult for both Ukrainian and Russian forces. At the same time, after the Liberation of Kherson from Russian troops, Russian forces began to regularly shell Kherson and neighboring settlements. The goal of the Russian shelling of Kherson has been characterized as an attempt by the Russians to undermine the morale of Ukrainian society.

In the winter of 2022–2023, a relative calm was established in the Zaporizhzhia Oblast, where mainly isolated skirmishes and artillery exchanges took place. In mid-January, Russian forces tried to advance towards Orikhiv and Huliaipole, but they were unable to achieve any major gains.

On February 10, Politico reported that Russia had amassed significant forces near Kupiansk in the Kharkiv Oblast, which was initially captured by the Russians in February 2022 but was recaptured by the Ukrainian Armed Forces during the 2022 Kharkiv counteroffensive after a week-long battle. Simultaneously, rumors were spreading among residents of Kharkiv Oblast that Russia was preparing a large–scale invasion of the region, with the goal of retaking territory lost in late 2022. At the end of February 2023, the Ukrainian Main Directorate of Intelligence, Kyrylo Budanov, warned that the Russians could be preparing a powerful offensive in the Kupiansk area. The attempt by Russian forces to regain control of the Kupiansk area and push Ukrainian forces away from Svatove saw limited gains, and by the end of winter, the Russians had captured only a few villages that were not of great strategic importance.

Since October 2022, Russia has also been conducting an air campaign to destroy Ukrainian energy assets and other critical infrastructure, in an attempt to deprive Ukrainians of heat and electricity during harsh winter months. The Russian goal in this ongoing campaign is to force the Ukrainian government to make concessions to Moscow. As of April 2023, however, the ISW noted that Russia had so far failed in its attempt to create a humanitarian catastrophe in Ukraine. The Russian air campaign against Ukrainian critical infrastructure is ongoing as of 2025.

=== Threat of invasion from Belarus ===
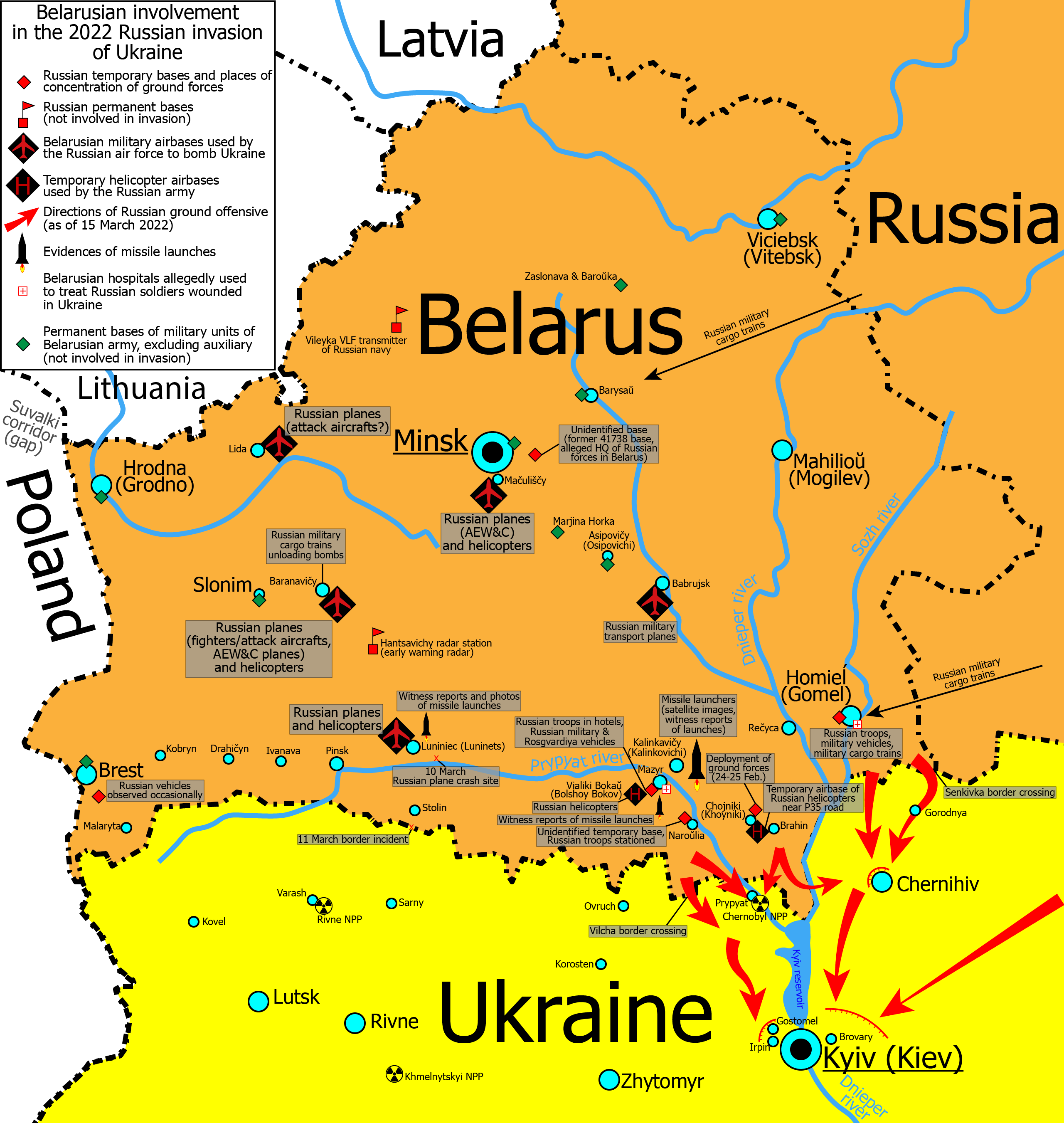
Map of Russian military activities in Belarus as of 15 March 2022.

Belarus, a close ally of Russia, has been used as a staging area for Russian troops, since the beginning of the full-scale invasion of Ukraine. However, following the retreat of Russian troops from north-eastern Ukraine (including Kyiv) in late March 2022, Russia has not made any further attempts to attack Ukraine from Belarus.

In October 2022, Belarusian President Alexander Lukashenko announced the deployment of a regional group of troops from Belarus and Russia.

In December 2022, the Belarusian armed forces conducted military exercises, the largest since the invasion of Ukraine, and several brigades of Belarusian troops moving to the border with Ukraine. On December 19, 2022, Russian President Vladimir Putin visited Belarus for the first time in three and a half years, sparking a wave of rumors that Russia was trying to drag Belarus into a war with Ukraine.

In December 2022, Ukrainian intelligence and the ISW noted that an invasion from Belarus, although possible, was unlikely.

In early January 2023, there was an increase in activity of Russian units in Belarus, which were estimated at the time to consist of 13,000 troops. Against the backdrop of the Russian winter offensive in Donbas, there was also a threat of Russian troops opening a “second front” against Ukraine from Belarusian territory. However, observers called Russian activity in Belarus an “information operation” aimed at distracting the Ukrainian Armed Forces from other sections of the front. Russian forces have not attacked Ukraine from Belarusian territory since 2022, but Russia continues to maintain units in Belarus as of 2025.

== Results ==
In March 2023, American military analyst John R. Deni stated: “The vaunted Russian winter offensive has not only begun, it has been going on for a month. And it is not making significant progress. Russia may reach the climax of the offensive and exhaust its offensive potential just as the Ukrainians integrate all those tanks and other armored vehicles that will allow Ukraine to counterattack. If they do that in the spring, they may have a chance of losing the war to Russia.”

Analyzing the Russian winter offensive, military expert Michael Kofman noted that Russian commanders Sergey Surovikin and Valery Gerasimov had radically different strategies for waging war in Ukraine. Kofman argued that Surovikin “chose defense, building up forces, and repelling the Ukrainian Armed Forces offensive in the south,” while Gerasimov “exhausted Russian forces with offensive operations that yielded minimal and by no means strategically important results.”

According to US government estimates from April 2023, at least 20,000 Russian troops were killed during the offensive. About half of these losses were attributed to the PMC Wagner, of which the majority were involved in Bakhmut. John Kirby, the White House National Security Council's Coordinator for Strategic Communications, said that Russia "exhausted its military reserves and armed forces" during this offensive.

However, analysts noted that the winter battles of 2022–2023 were also difficult for Ukraine, which suffered significant losses among military personnel and experienced a constant shortage of ammunition.

== See also ==
2022 Kherson counteroffensive
2022 Kharkiv counteroffensive
2023 Ukrainian counteroffensive
