= Pivdennodonbaska 1 coal mine =

Coal mine in Vuhledar, Donetsk, Ukraine

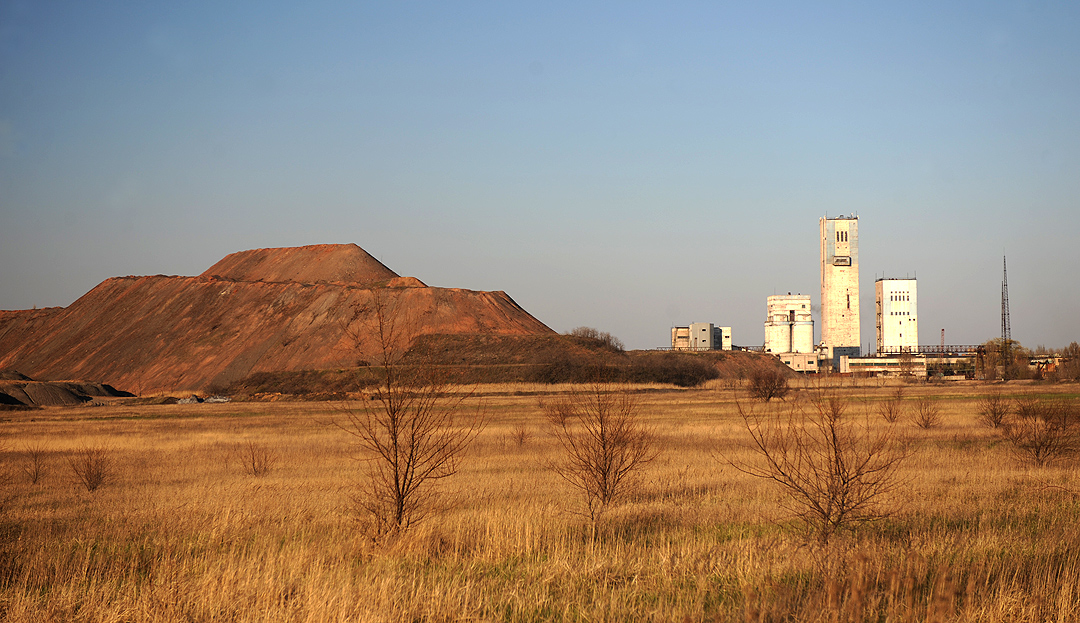
- Location: Vuhledar, Donetsk Oblast, Ukraine
- Products: Coal
- Production: 1,200,000
- Opened: 1973

The Pivdennodonbaska 1 coal mine (Ukrainian: Шахта «Південнодонбаська № 1») is a large coal mine located in the south-east of Ukraine in Donetsk Oblast. Pivdennodonbaska 1 represents one of the largest coal reserves in Ukraine, having estimated reserves of 69.3 million tonnes. The annual coal production of the mine is around 1.2 million tonnes, representing approximately 10% of Ukraine's total coal output. It operates at a depth of up to 620 metres, and was recognised as a prospective enterprise following an efficiency audit in both 2015 and 2018.

In September 2024, the mine was captured by Russian Armed Forces following the assault on Vuhledar, and it remains under Russian occupation as of 2026.

== History ==
Following the outbreak of the War in the Donbas in 2014, the mine remained under Ukrainian control. In June 2017, a new longwall was commissioned at the mine at a depth of 385 metres, which was expected to yield 800 tonnes of coal per day.

However, despite the investments, the mine faced recurring financial difficulties, with persistent wage arrears and electricity debt problems. In July 2019, miners working at the mine blockaded the Volnovakha-Donetsk highway for twelve days until they received their overdue wages, which were granted. In February 2020, the mine faced disconnection from electricity due to approximately 120 million hryvnias in debt, leading to multiple warnings that the mine could be fully flooded and potentially severely damage Vuhledar itself. In June 2020, the mine again suspended coal operations due to the inability to pay railway tariffs. Again, later that year in October, the mine went without power for some time, and in November 2021, the mine was once again disconnected from electricity, with energy experts noting the problem had been persistent for over three years at that point.

Following the Russian invasion of Ukraine, the mine became strategically significant as a key defense position near Vuhledar. Ukrainian forces, including the 2nd Halychyna Brigade of the Ukrainian National Guard and the 72nd Mechanized Brigade both held defensive positions across the mine and faced continuous Russian assaults starting in September 2024. Later that month, the mine was captured by the Russian Armed Forces, who started occupying it.

== See also ==
- Coal in Ukraine
- List of mines in Ukraine
