= 72nd Mechanized Brigade =

Ukrainian Ground Forces formation

72nd Mechanized Brigade (2016–present) 72nd Guards Mechanized Brigade (2002–2016) 72nd Guards Mechanized Division (1992–2002) 72nd Guards Motor Rifle Division (1957–1992) 72nd Guards Rifle Division (1943–1957) 29th Rifle Division (2nd Formation) (1941–1943)
- 72nd Mechanized Brigade Sleeve Patch
- Active: December 5, 1941 – present
- Country: Ukraine
- Branch: Ukrainian Ground Forces
- Role: Mechanized Infantry
- Size: Brigade (~3,000)
- Part of: Operational Command North
- Garrison/HQ: Bila Tserkva, Kyiv Oblast
- Nickname: The Black Brigade
- Motto: Ukraine or death! (Ukrainian: Україна або смерть!)
- March: "Brave Lads, Brave Army" (Ukrainian: Хоробрі хлопці, відважне військо!)
- Equipment: T-64
- Engagements: World War II Russo-Ukrainian War: 2014 pro-Russian unrest in Ukraine; War in Donbas; Battle of Mariupol; Battle of Avdiivka; Russian invasion of Ukraine; Battle of Antonov Airport; Battle of Moshchun; Battle of Brovary; Battle of Bakhmut; Battle of Vuhledar
- Decorations: Order of the Red Banner (removed) For Courage and Bravery
- Battle honours: Krasnohrad (removed); Kyiv (removed); Chornykh Zaporozhtsiv

Insignia
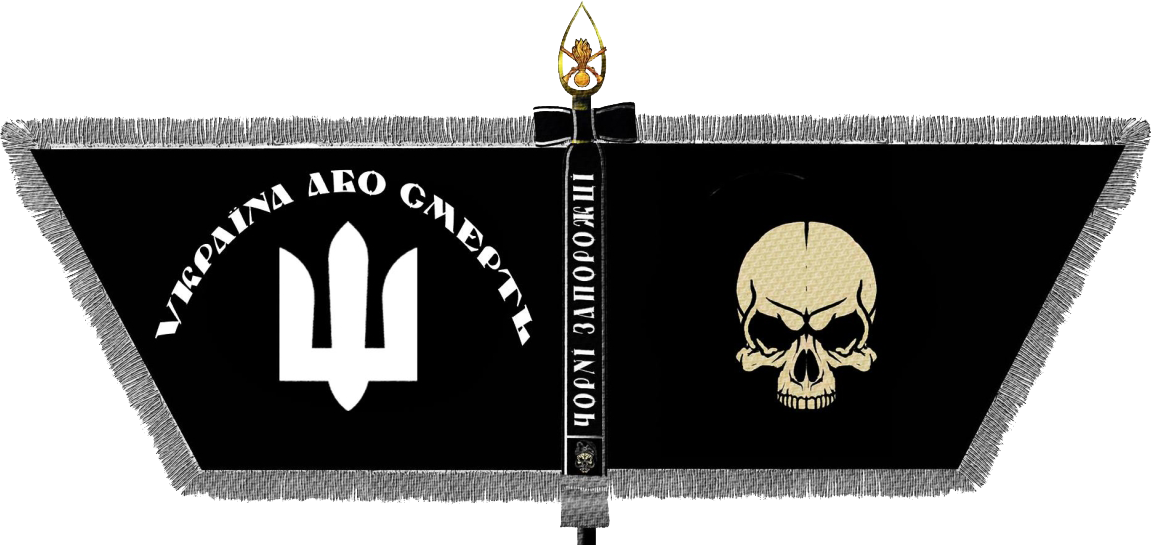
- Standard

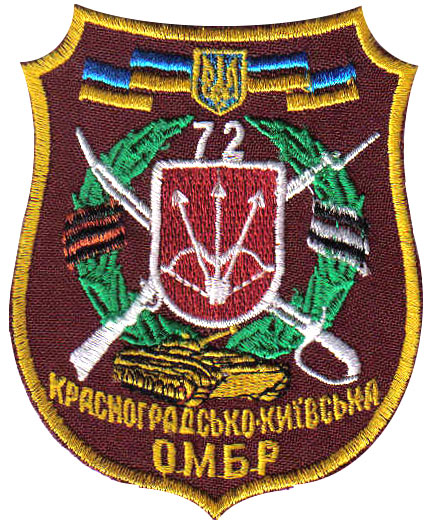
- Shoulder sleeve insignia (1992-2019)

The 72nd Separate Mechanized Brigade named after the Black Zaporozhians is a mechanized infantry brigade formation of the Ukrainian Ground Forces. It was founded during World War II as 29th Rifle Division (2nd formation) of the Soviet Ground Forces. In 1943 it was restructured as the 72nd Guards Rifle Division of the Soviet Ground Forces. In 1957, it became a motor rifle division. After the collapse of the Soviet Union, the 72nd Guards Mechanized Division of the Soviet Ground Forces became the 72nd Guards Mechanized Division of the Ukrainian Armed Forces.

In 2014, the brigade participated in the Ukrainian-Russian war in Donbas as part of the so-called Anti-Terrorist Operation. In summer of 2014, units of the brigade fought hard on the Russian-Ukrainian border, in the Azov region, and, in winter of 2016, in the industrial zone near Avdiivka.

In August 2017, the brigade received an honorary title after the Zaporozhian Cossack military formation of the Ukrainian People's Republic, the Black Zaporizhian Cavalry Regiment.

The brigade is actively protecting Ukrainian territory in the Russian invasion of Ukraine. The brigade participated in battles in the Kyiv Oblast and in the Donbas.

== History ==
=== World War II ===
The 29th Rifle Division (2nd formation) was redesignated the 72nd Guards Rifle Division by Directorate of the General Staff order No.104 on 1 March 1943. The units of the division were renumbered as follows:

29th Rifle Division	72nd Guards Rifle Division
106th Rifle Regiment	222nd Guards Rifle Regiment
128th Rifle Regiment	224th Guards Rifle Regiment
77th Artillery Regiment	155th Guards Artillery Regiment

On March 3, 1943, 72nd Guards Rifle Division was involved in battles for liberation of Belgorod. Soon they were near Kharkiv and Krasnohrad. On 19 September, the division was awarded the title Krasnohrad. On 8 January 1944, the division was awarded the Order of the Red Banner.

The division fought in the Budapest Offensive from late October 1944. On 15 December, units of the division reinforced Cavalry Mechanized Group Pliev during the attack on Szécsény. On 9 January, the division was attached to the 24th Guards Rifle Corps. The division captured the area around Bart. The division's attack was stopped by the 1st Battalion of Grenadier Regiment 317 a kilometer north of the village.

=== Cold War ===
In May 1946, the division became the 7th Guards Rifle Brigade, part of the 33rd Guards Rifle Corps. In October 1953, it became a division again. The 72nd Guards Rifle Division became a motor rifle division stationed in the Kyiv Military District at Bila Tserkva on 4 June 1957. It was part of the 1st Guards Army (Soviet Union). On 19 February 1962, the 280th Separate Equipment Maintenance and Recovery Battalion was activated. A missile battalions was also activated on the same day. In 1968, the 220th Separate Guards Sapper Battalion became an Engineer Sapper Battalion. In 1972, the 191st Separate Chemical Defence Company became the 23rd Separate Chemical Defence Battalion. The 1345th Separate Anti-Tank Artillery Battalion was activated on 15 November 1972. At some point between 1970 and 1980 the 1129th Anti-Aircraft Artillery Regiment became the 1129th Anti-Aircraft Rocket Regiment, equipped with surface-to-air missiles. The motor transport battalion became the 892nd Separate Material Supply Battalion in 1980. In 1990, the division was equipped with 133 T-64 main battle tanks. During the Cold War, the division was maintained at 25% strength, with one full strength regiment.

=== Ukraine ===
After the fall of the Soviet Union it was transferred to Ukraine. In 1992, Colonel Volodymyr Lytvyntsev – Commander 72nd Guards Motor Rifle Division of the Kyiv Military District was given the rank of Major General.

On August 23, 1995, Colonel Nikolai Nikolaevich Tsytsyursky, Commander 72nd Mechanized Infantry Division of the 1st Army Corps of the Odesa Military District, was given the rank of Major-General. In accordance with a decree of August 23, 1998, division commander Colonel Grigoriy Pedchenko was promoted to major-general. On June 29, 1999, the 72nd Guards Mechanized Division of the Operational Command North of the Armed Forces of Ukraine was given the honorary title of "Kyiv".

It was reduced in size to a mechanized brigade in 2002.

In May 2014 72nd Guards Mechanized Brigade was involved in the Mariupol standoff during the war in Donbas. During this conflict Ukrainian singers Zlata Ognevich and Anastasia Prikhodko raised money for the Brigade. The brigade defended Sector D near Chervonopartyzansk, Sverdlovsk and Diakove alongside the 51st Mechanized Brigade from July 2014. Separatist and Russian attacks resulted in the brigade being surrounded and cut off from supply by early August. The brigade's 1st Battalion and elements of the 51st Brigade, along with a group of border guards (about 400 total), destroyed their weapons and crossed into Russia. They were interned and returned to Ukrainian territory. Major Mykhailo Drapatyi's 2nd Battalion of the brigade near Chernopartyzhansk broke out of the encirclement, covered by the 30th Mechanized and 95th Airmobile Brigades from the south. Two soldiers from the 2nd Battalion were killed in the breakout. The convoy in which 195 soldiers of the brigade returned to Ukrainian territory after crossing into Russia on 4 August 2014 was fired on by separatists.

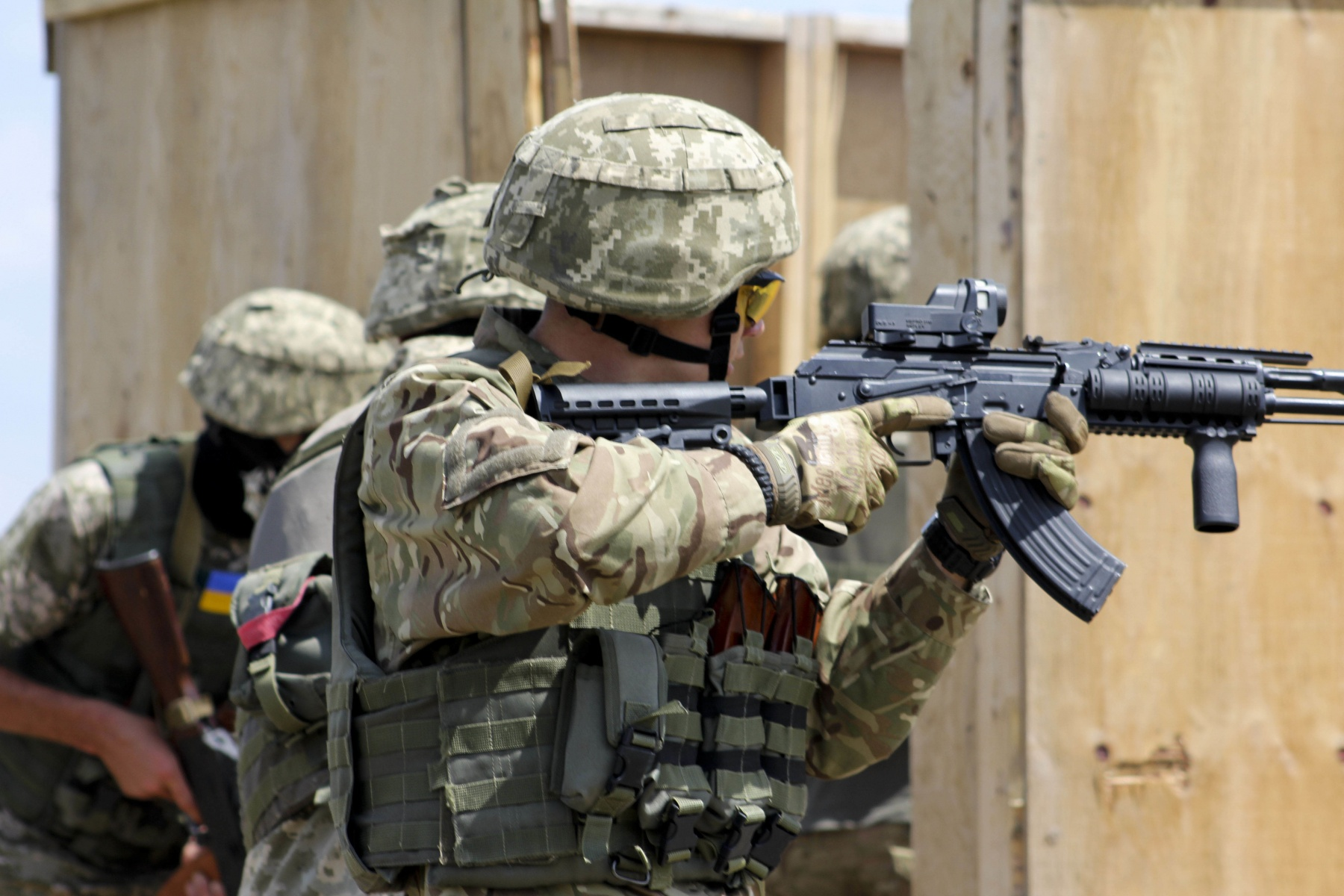
Soldiers of the 72nd Brigade in a military exercise

On 18 November 2015 the brigade's honorific "Red Banner" was removed as part of an Armed Forces-wide removal of Soviet awards and honorifics. On 22 August 2016, its Guards title was removed. Its honorifics "Krasnohrad–Kyiv" were removed and replaced with the honorific Black Zaporozhian in honor of the Ukrainian People's Army Black Zaporizhian Cavalry Regiment on 23 August 2017.

=== Russian invasion of Ukraine ===
==== Defense of Kyiv ====
On the morning of 24 February 2022, the Russian Armed Forces invaded Ukraine. The 72nd Mechanized Brigade was one of few maneuver formations defending Ukraine's capital, Kyiv, to include a number of special operations, national guard, and hastily formed Territorial Defense Forces which all told, formed an estimated 20,000 infantry force.

The 72nd Brigade was assigned to defend a frontage of approximately 70 kilometers in the form of a "180-degree arc" from Stoianka just west of Kyiv to Brovary at its east. The Ukrainian army was under the impression that if Kyiv were to be attacked, the main Russian assault would come from the direction of Chernihiv in the northeast, and thus the majority of the 72nd Brigade, comprising its 1st and 3rd Mechanized Battalions, artillery, anti-tank, and other support units, was deployed from its base in Bila Tserkva to Kyiv's eastern flank by 22 February.

The brigade's 2nd Mechanized Battalion was deployed to defend a 22-kilometer line northwest of Kyiv along the Irpin River from Horenka to Lyutizh. The 2nd Battalion was assigned the expected secondary role, in part, because it was understrength; a publication by The British Army Review estimated that the battalion numbered fewer than 150 soldiers on 24 February, though its ranks were filled by volunteers soon after the invasion. After initial reconnoitering of the region on 17–18 February, the 72nd Brigade's deputy commander assigned the battalion's 4th Company to Horenka, its 5th Company to Moshchun and the outskirts of Chervone, and its 6th Company to Huta-Mezhyhirska and Lyutizh. The battalion's vehicles arrived to the operational area in the early morning hours of 24 February. Its personnel began deploying to their positions as the initial 05:00 Russian bombardment of Ukraine began and throughout the rest of the morning, and quickly began digging trenches and fighting positions. In several cases, the delivery of weapons and ammunition was severely delayed. Newly enlisted civilian volunteers arrived on the night of 24 February, and throughout 25 and 26 February.

The Russian 35th, 36th, and 41st Combined Arms armies barreled down roads from Belarus and southern Russian towards Kyiv. The brigade met their formations armed with western supplied weaponry such as FGM-148 Javelin and NLAW destroying tanks from as far as a mile away. The brigade's primary role, however, was reconnaissance of the Russian formations and to provide targeting data to the two artillery brigades including the 44th Artillery for strikes. Ukraine's artillery was used to great effect and reduced cohesion among Russian battalions.

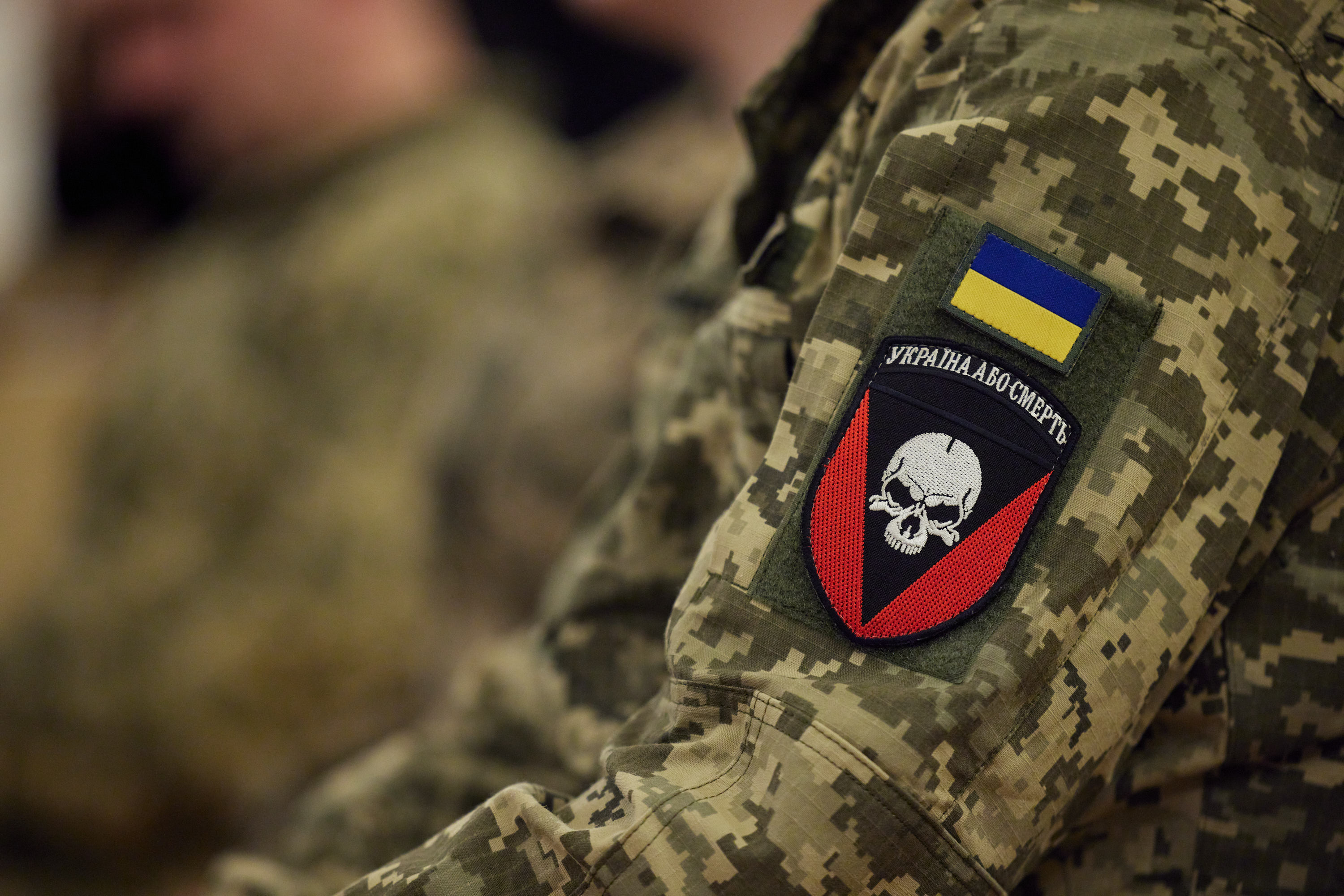
Soldier with a patch of the 72nd Mechanized Brigade

According to a publication by The British Army Review, interviews with Ukrainian soldiers indicated that the 72nd Brigade was severely understrength on 24 February; an engineer battalion was meant to have 170 soldiers but only had 36.

Ukraine's top general, Valerii Zaluzhnyi, recognized the danger Russia's airhead at Hostomel posed to Ukraine's capital and ordered the brigade to organize a counterattack. With the 4th Rapid Reaction Brigade, and support from the Ukrainian Air Force, launched their attack on the Russian forces who lacked armour support but had close air support in the form of at least two Su-25's. As the operation progressed, more Ukrainian units from the Georgian Legion and Air Assault Forces joined the fight, denying Russia the ability to fly in troops via Il-76. Ukrainian units surrounded the airport by the evening and forced the remaining Russian troops into nearby forests. Later, the 4th Rapid Reaction Brigade posted on their Facebook an image of Ukrainian soldiers celebrating while holding a bullet-riddled flag inside Hostomel Airport.

The brigade continued to apply pressure to Russian vanguard formations destroying a number of tanks and IFV's fixing the beleaguered units in place while serving as forward observers for continued artillery strikes. The majority of losses came when the Russian units were concentrated by artillery fire, stalling their advance for several days and leading to the infamous 40-mile convoy north of Kyiv.

Now stalled, Ukrainian units across the front counterattacked, squeezing the Russian units into narrow corridors to make their situation untenable. In Brovary, the brigade ambushed a Russian armoured column from the 90th Guards Tank Division hitting the first and last vehicle while trapping the middle vehicles. The Ukrainians were unable to cut off the Russian's route of escape causing many of their forces to flee into nearby forests. Despite their retreat, heavy fighting continued in the surrounding area for several days. Russian forces were reported to have shot civilians suspected in aiding the Ukrainian forces during the fighting. On 29 March, the Russian Ministry of Defence ordered its forces in the region to retreat and were later redeployed for the fighting in the east. On 1 April, the city's mayor claimed Ukrainian forces pushed the Russian forces out of Brovary.

==== Operations in eastern Ukraine ====
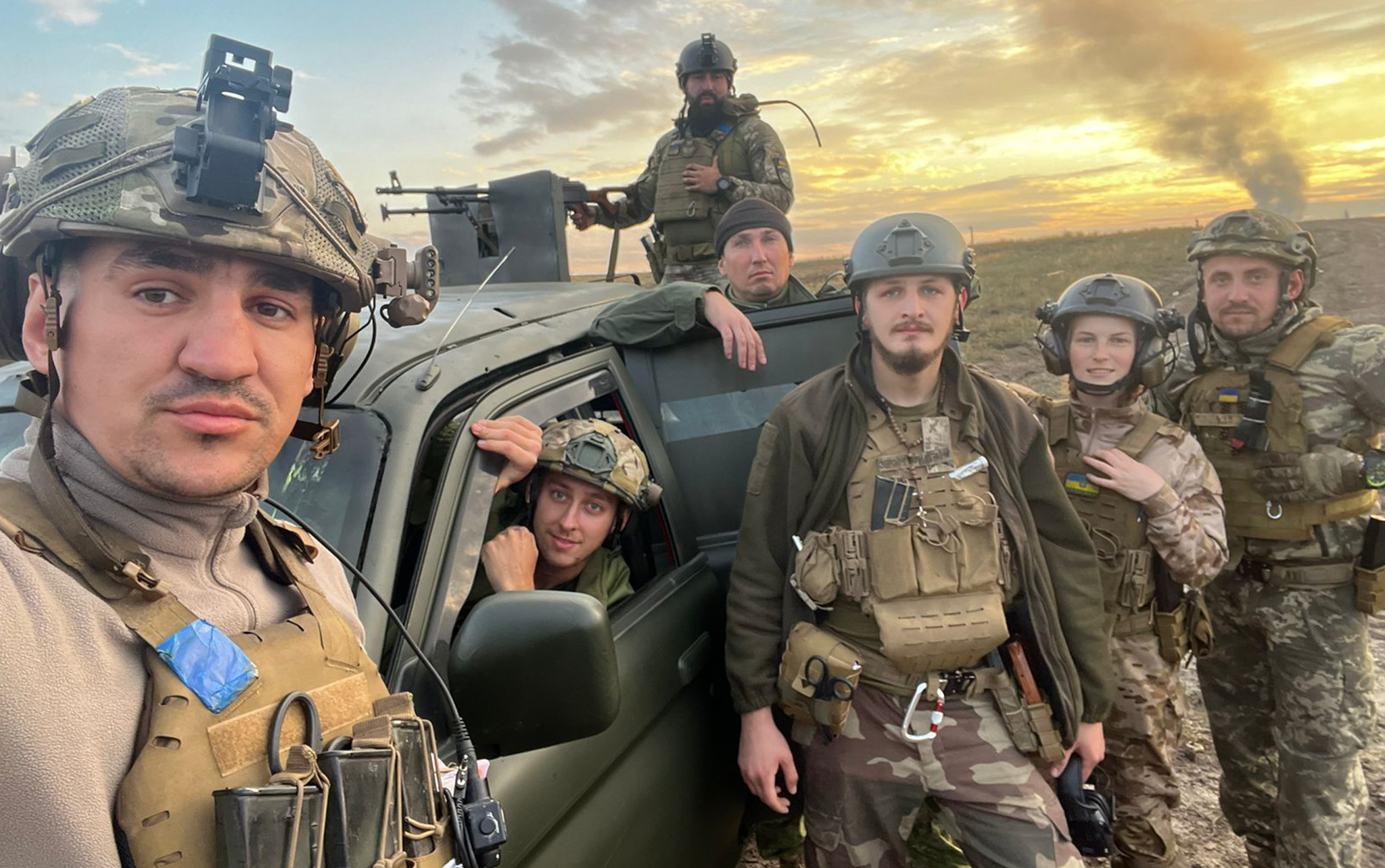
The 72nd Brigade's mobile aerial reconnaissance group with a technical

The 72nd Brigade was deployed to eastern Ukraine after the successful defense of Kyiv. Throughout summer, the brigade participated in the Donbas offensive, namely the Bakhmut area fighting in the battle of Bakhmut. Heavy fighting in the area resulted in substantial casualties to the brigade's professional soldiers causing many of their positions to be replaced by conscripts. The brigade's reconnaissance company was reduced from 128 men to 82 due to casualties.

Sometime in August, the brigade was redeployed to Pavlivka. The brigade assessed that 600 Russian troops and 30 armored vehicles entered their area of operation culminating in a battle in late October. On November 3, the Russian 155th Naval Infantry Brigade committed its forces to the battle. The brigade's commander released a video intended for the governor of the Primorsky Oblast, the unit's home, asking for help as the brigade suffered 300 casualties. Losses were heavy on both sides and the brigade eventually withdrew.

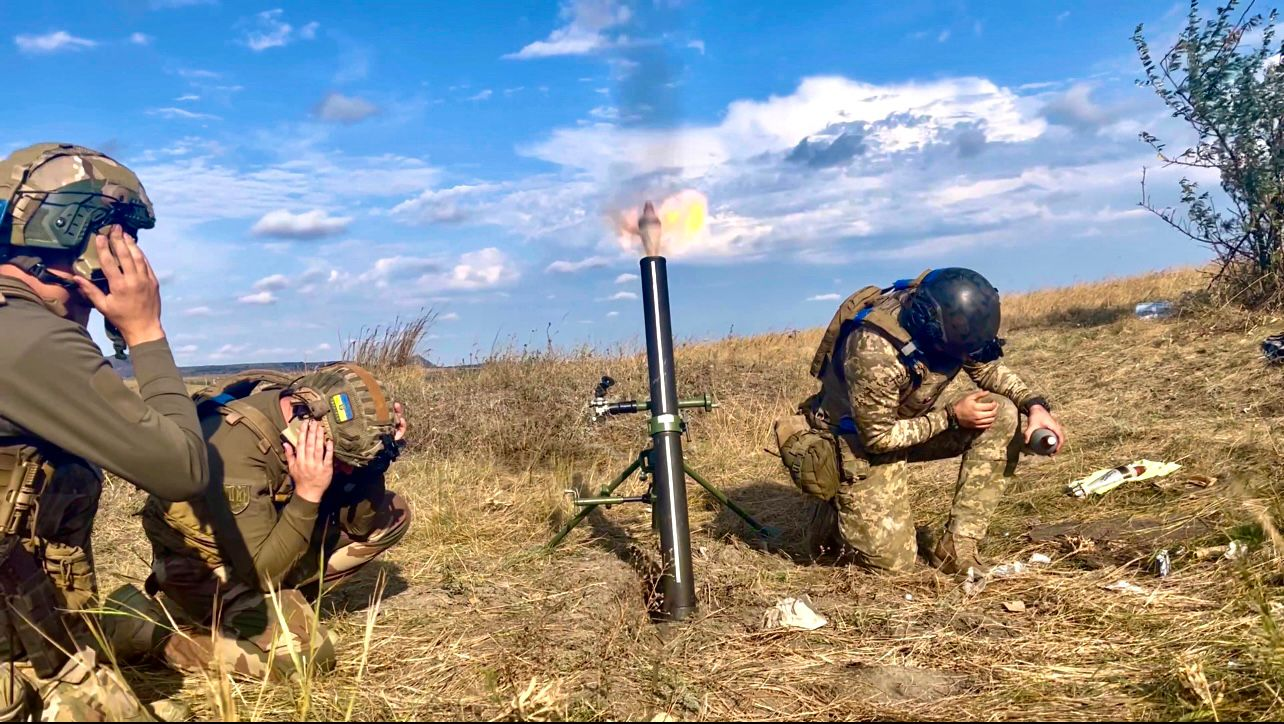
72nd Brigade soldiers firing Iranian-made HM-16 mortar seized from the Houthis by the United States.

By January 2023, the brigade fortified Vuhledar following Pavlivka's fall against a renewed assault from the 155th Guards Naval Infantry. The Russian advance was initially successful, breaking through frontal lines, however, ultimately failed as casualties mounted due to frontal assaults, lack of ammunition for their organic fire support, the use of their T-80 tanks in an indirect fire role, and lack of staffing to properly organise an offensive. Members of the 72nd Mechanized Brigade destroyed Naval Infantry tanks and a BMP-3 infantry fighting vehicle with their Javelin anti-tank missiles.

In September 2024, the brigade was still defending Vuhledar. The deputy commander complained by then to war correspondents that his troops lacked air defences and were "exhausted" because they had had zero rotations since February 2022. The commander Ivan Vinnik was promoted and transferred to a different position amidst a worsening condition for the brigade in Vuhledar. On 1 October 2024, the last surviving elements of the brigade withdrew from the city, which came under full control of the Russian army.

In December of 2025, the 72nd brigade was fighting along the Russian forward positions near Vovchansk, in the Kharkiv area. A brigade ground drone evacuated a man who had held position for 275 days.

In 2026 the Brigade's Bulava battalion, ranked as one of the most effective unmanned systems battalions in the Ukrainian Ground Forces, destroyed a TOS-1A Solntsepyok, a heavy flamethrower system on Russian territory. The weapon system was hit by four FPV drones which triggered an explosion of the thermobaric munitions.The brigade had tracked the weapon system for many days.

== Awards ==
- March 1, 1943, received the honorable designation "Guards"
- January 1944, received Order of the Red Banner award for clearing the city of Kirovohrad
- September 20, 1943, received the honorable name "Krasnohradska"
- August 23, 2017, received the honorary title "Chornykh Zaporozhtsiv"

== Famous people of the division ==
- Lieutenant Volodymyr Mykheiev – First person in the division to receive Hero of Soviet Union award
- Oles' Honchar, Oleksandr – Ukrainian writer
- Vadym Titushko - From the surname Titushko came the term "Titushky" - athletic young men who, for a reward with brute force, disperse peaceful protests or carry out various provocations against opposition activists. The term came into widespread use during the Euromaidan period when the pro-Russian regime of Yanukovych used titushky to reprisal protesters.

== Divisional order of battle ==
=== 1988–1991 ===
Late Soviet Period Structure

- 222nd Guards Motor Rifle Regiment – Bila Tserkva
- 224th Guards Motor Rifle Regiment – Bila Tserkva
- 229th Guards Motor Rifle Regiment – Bila Tserkva
- 292nd Guards Tank Regiment – Honcharivske
- 155th Guards Artillery Regiment – Smila
- 1129th Anti-Aircraft Artillery Regiment – Bila Tserkva
- 1345th Anti-Tank Artillery Battalion – Bila Tserkva
- 117th Reconnaissance Battalion – Bila Tserkva
- 538th Communications Battalion – Bila Tserkva
- 23rd Chemical Defence Battalion – Bila Tserkva
- 220th Engineer Battalion – Bila Tserkva
- 280th Maintenance Battalion
- 892nd Combat Service Support Battalion

=== 1992–2002 ===
- Divisional HQ and Headquarters Company
- 224th Mechanized Infantry Regiment
- 229th Mechanized Infantry Regiment
- Tank Battalion
- 155th Field Artillery Regiment (Self-Propelled)
- 1129th Anti-Aircraft Missile Regiment
- 1345th Anti-Tank Artillery Battalion
- 220th Engineer Battalion
- 538th Signal Battalion
- 117th Reconnaissance Battalion
- 23rd Chemical Battalion
- 892nd Logistics Battalion
- 280th Repair and Recovery Battalion
- 149th Medical Battalion

== Structure ==
As of 2024, the brigade's structure is as follows:

- 72nd Mechanized Brigade, Bila Tserkva
  - Brigade Headquarters
  - 1st Mechanized Battalion
    - Battalion Headquarters
    - 1st Mechanized Company
    - 2nd Mechanized Company
    - 3rd Mechanized Company
    - Grenade Launcher Platoon
    - Reconnaissance Platoon
    - Mortar Battery
    - Anti-Aircraft Platoon
    - Communications Platoon
    - Medical Platoon
    - Support Company
  - 2nd Mechanized Battalion
    - Battalion Headquarters
    - 1st Mechanized Company
    - 2nd Mechanized Company
    - 3rd Mechanized Company
    - Grenade Launcher Platoon
    - Mortar Battery
    - Anti-Aircraft Platoon
    - Reconnaissance Platoon
    - Communications Platoon
    - Medical Platoon
    - Support Company
  - 3rd Mechanized Battalion
    - Strike UAV platoon "Totem"
    - Battalion Headquarters
    - 1st Mechanized Company
    - 2nd Mechanized Company
    - 3rd Mechanized Company
    - Grenade Launcher Platoon
    - Reconnaissance Platoon
    - Mortar Battery
    - Anti-Aircraft Platoon
    - Communications Platoon
    - Medical Platoon
    - Support Company
  - 1st Rifle Battalion
  - 2nd Rifle Battalion
  - Shkval Company
  - Tank Battalion
  - Artillery Group
  - Anti-Aircraft Defense Battalion
  - Unmanned Systems Battalion "Bulava"
  - Reconnaissance Company
  - Anti-Aircraft Defense Battalion
  - Engineer Battalion
  - Logistic Battalion
  - Maintenance Battalion
  - Signal Company
  - Radar Company
  - Medical Company
  - Chemical, Biological, Radiological and Nuclear Defense Company
  - 48th Rifle Battalion
    - Aerial Reconnaissance Group "Iskander"
    - Headquarters & Target Acquisition Battery
    - Self-propelled Artillery Battalion (2S3 Akatsiya)
    - Self-propelled Artillery Battalion (2S1 Gvozdika)
    - Rocket Artillery Battalion (BM-21 Grad)
    - Anti-tank Artillery Battalion (MT-12 Rapira)
  - Brigade Band

== Traditions ==
Own symbolism appeared in the division in the second half of the 1990s. In the fall of 1996, the head of the group of socio-psychological department of the 229th Mechanized Regiment of the 72nd Mechanized Division Major V. Peknyi developed a system of sleeve patches for Command and Staff and other units of the division. All emblems were a shield of uniform shape and size, horizontally divided into two halves. The upper part contained symbols of the division: a bow with three arrows taken from coat of arms of Bila Tserkva on a fortress wall with a rising sun. The lower part was intended for symbols of individual regiment or battalion.

The brigade has a march: "Brave guys, a brave army!".

Until 2017, she had the honorary name of Krasnograd-Kyiv.

On August 23, 2017, in order to restore the historical traditions of the National Army on the names of military units, given the exemplary completion of the tasks, high rates in combat training and on the occasion of the 26th anniversary. On August 24, 2017, at the Independence Day parade of Ukraine, President of Ukraine Petro Poroshenko presented the brigade with new colours.

On March 7, 2019, the Head of the General Staff of the Armed Forces Viktor Muzhenko approved the new symbolism of the brigade. The sketch mark consists of two elements: a wicked emblem and the motto. The emblem contains a British heraldic shield of red, the color of the shield symbolizes belonging to the point of permanent dislocation - the White Church, the color of which is also red. At the heart of the shield is an image of a black triangle, which combines the corners of the shield, which symbolizes the black headdress - the snack of the fighter of the equestrian regiment of the Black Cossacks. In the center of the shield is the image of the Adam's head, which is located on the back of the banners of the Black Cossacks. The deviation tape is a curved ribbon with the motto of the horse regiment of the Black Cossacks "Ukraine or Death" in the middle.

In December 2019, the brigade received a personal honorary standard (Korogwa) based on the historical symbolism of the Horse Regiment of Black Cossacks.

On May 6, 2022, the brigade was awarded the honorary award "For Courage and Bravery" for its role in the defense of the capital.

== Commanders ==
- Major General Anatoly Losev (1 March 1943 – 24 March 1945)
- Lieutenant Colonel Grigory Balatov (25 March – 25 April 1945)
- Colonel Alexander Pankov (26 April – 11 May 1945)
- Major General Pyotr Berestov (July 1945 – January 1947)
- Major General Sergiy Bezlishchenko
- Colonel Andriy Hryshchenko (– June 2015)
- Colonel Andriy Sokolov (June 2015 – present)
