= 23rd Reconnaissance Battalion (Ukraine) =

23rd Reconnaissance Battalion 23rd Rifle Battalion (2015-2025)
- 23-й окремий розвідувальний батальйон
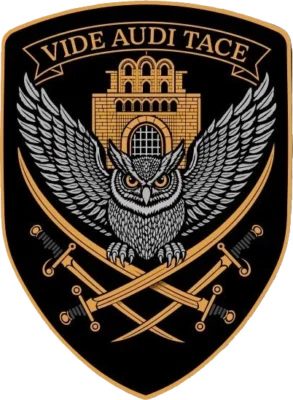
- Founded: 2015
- Country: Ukraine
- Allegiance: Armed Forces of Ukraine
- Branch: Ukrainian Ground Forces
- Type: Special forces
- Role: Reconnaissance, counteroffensive and sabotage
- Size: Battalion
- Part of: 20th Army Corps
- Garrison/HQ: Kyiv
- Motto: Vide - audi - tace
- Engagements: Russo-Ukrainian War; War in Donbass; 2022 Russian invasion of Ukraine
- Website: Official Facebook page

Commanders
- Current commander: Lt. Col. Dmytro Avhustinovych

Insignia
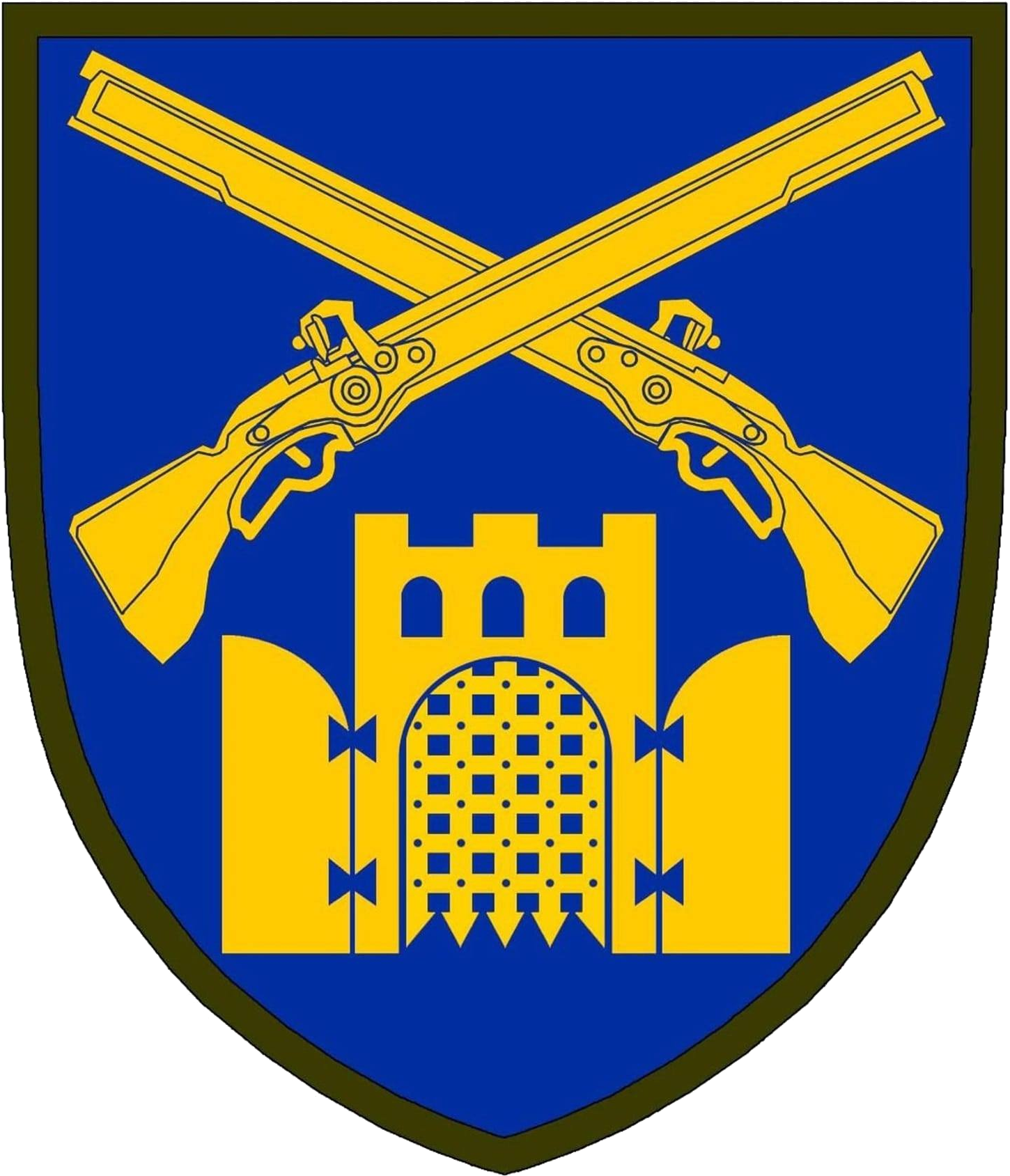
- Former Insignia

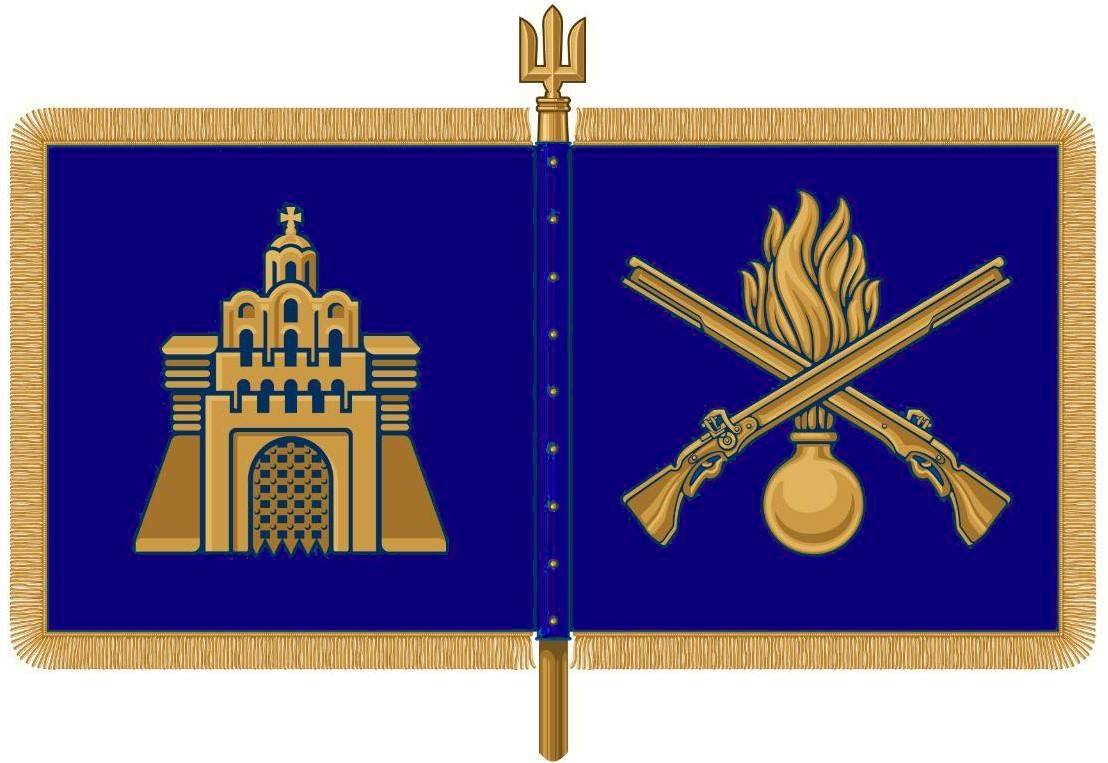
- Standard

The 23rd Separate Reconnaissance Battalion (MUN A7107) is a battalion of the Ukrainian ground forces acting as an independent unit subordinated to first, the 63rd Separate Mechanized Brigade, then the 116th Mechanized Brigade and now, the 118th Mechanized Brigade. It has seen combat during both the War in Donbass and the Russo-Ukrainian war, initially as a rifle battalion and has been performing reconnaissance and combat operations throughout the entire front.

== History ==
In 2015, the 23rd Separate Rifle Battalion was created to defend Kyiv.

Following the 2022 Russian invasion of Ukraine, volunteers joined the battalion and it saw combat action. On 24 March 2022, a soldier of the battalion (Korchak Ihor Valeriovych) was killed in action during the Battle of Kyiv. In March 2022, it took part in the Battle of Irpin and also performed clearing operations after the city's liberation.

It saw heavy action in Novomykhailivka. On 15 July 2022, a soldier of the battalion (Barvytsky Mykola Ivanovych) was killed in action in Novomykhailivka. On 17 July 2022, a soldier of the brigade (Fedyuk Leonid Bohdanovych) was killed in action in Novomykhailivka. On 31 July 2022, a soldier of the battalion (Lytvynenko Oleh Anatoliovych) was killed in action in Novomykhailivka. On 2 August 2022, a soldier of the battalion (Piven Dmytro Oleksandrovych) was killed in action in Novomykhailivka. On 20 August 2022, two soldiers of the battalion (Dimitryuk Oleksi Volodymyrovych and Rabukha Artem Hryhorovych) were killed in action in Novomykhailivka. On 22 August 2022, four soldiers of the battalion (Siryk Jurij Volodymyrovych, Polova Kyrylo Borysovych, Kovalenko Volodymyr Viktorovych and Sutulin Anatoli Anatoliovych) were killed in combat in Novomykhailivka. On 24 August 2022, a soldier of the brigade (Svirhun Viktor Mykhailovych) was killed in combat in Novomykhailivka. On 26 August 2022, two soldiers of the battalion (Boldyryev Oleksi Serhiovych and Shmatko Jurij Andrijovych) were killed in combat in Novomykhailivka. On 28 August 2022, two soldiers of the battalion (Arestanov Kostantyn Volodymyrovych and Berestenko Semen Semenovych) were killed in combat in Novomykhailivka. On 31 August 2022, a soldier of the battalion (Smal Roman Borysovych) was killed in combat in Novomykhailivka.

On 6 September 2022, a soldier of the battalion (Shlonkin Oleh Olehovych) was killed in Donetsk Oblast. On 8 September 2022, a soldier of the battalion (Horzov Vasyl Mykhailovych) was killed in action during the Battle of Shakhtarsk. On 21 September 2022, a soldier of the battalion (Ipati Ivan Yuriovych) was killed in action during the Battle of Shakhtarsk.

On 1 November 2022, two soldiers of the battalion (Tsarenko Maksym Volodymyrovych and Shevel Oleksandr Viktorovych) were killed in combat in Donetsk Oblast. On 5 November 2022, a soldier of the battalion (Lupanchuk Vadym Oleksandrovych) went MIA. On 19 November 2022, two soldiers of the battalion (Yatsenko Vitali Viktorovych and Lazarenko Vyacheslav Mykolaiovych) were killed in combat in Donetsk Oblast.

In 2023–2024, it saw heavy action during the Battle of Lyman in Donetsk Oblast suffering ~20 killed and ~80 wounded. A soldier of the battalion (Yefimov Dmytro Valentynovych) was killed in combat on 31 March 2023, in Torske. As of August 2023, the battalion was fighting in the Donetsk Oblast as part of the 63rd Separate Mechanized Brigade. On 6 September 2023, a soldier of the battalion (Savelev Yevheni Anatoliovych) was killed in combat in Velyka Novosilka. On 30 November 2023, a soldier of the battalion (Shkurat Andri Serhiovych) was killed in action.

On 25 January 2024, a soldier of the battalion (Tarasenko Mykola Serhiovych) was killed in action in Torske. On 21 February 2024, a soldier of the battalion (Shpyryn Dmytro Mykolaiovych) was killed in action during the Battle of Kreminna. On 17 May 2024, the battalion conducted combined air and ground drone attacks on Russian positions and a soldier of the battalion (Savchenko Oleksi Yuriovych) was killed in action in Donetsk Oblast. On 12 July 2024, a soldier of the battalion (Prokopenko Denys Oleksandrovych) was killed in action in Donetsk Oblast. In July 2024, it was conducting FPV drone attacks. On 30 July 2024, a soldier of the battalion (Hrybovsky Yakiv Mykhailovych) was killed in action. On 7 August 2024, two soldiers of the battalion (Bilous Andri Volodymyrovych and Tur Yevheni Oleksiovych) were killed in Torske. On 17 August 2024, a soldier of the Battalion (Benzhytsky Andri Yuriovych) was killed in action. In late August 2024, it was using ground drones armed with artillery ammunition on the battlefield.

On 5 September 2024, a soldier of the battalion (Parkhomenko Pavlo Oleksandrovych) was killed during the Battle of Kreminna. On 7 September 2024, a soldier of the battalion (Sysoyev Pavlo Oleksandrovych) was killed in action. In September 2024, it was deployed to fight in Kharkiv Oblast as part of the 116th Mechanized Brigade. On 22 September 2024, two soldiers of the battalion (Mako Dmytro Serhiovych and Vnukov Yuri Stanislavovych) were killed during the Battle of Kupiansk. On 23 September 2024, a soldier of the battalion (Pavlynsky Dmytro Yuriovych) was killed during the Battle of Kupiansk. In September 2024, its personnel were demanding the resignation of the battalion commander. On 15 October 2024, a soldier of the battalion (Kosenko Anton Serhiovych) was killed during the Battle of Kupiansk. On 17 October 2024, a soldier of the battalion (Budko Serhi Oleksandrovych) was killed during the Battle of Kupiansk. In December 2024, the battalion was withdrawn from the frontlines for replenishment.

In February 2025, it became part of the 118th Mechanized Brigade and was deployed to take part in the Battle of Orikhiv. In August 2025, it was transformed into a reconnaissance battalion.

== Commanders ==
- Colonel Demchuk Oleksandr Mykolayovych (February 2022-October 2023)
- Lieutenant Colonel Avgustinovych Dmytro Viktorovych (November 2023-)
