= Dmytro Hnap =

Ukrainian journalist (born 1977)

- Дмитро Володимирович Гнап
- Born: 19 December 1977 (age 48); Vuhledar, Ukrainian SSR, Soviet Union
- Citizenship: Ukraine
- Occupation: journalist

Dmytro Volodymyrovych Hnap (Ukrainian: Дмитро Володимирович Гнап, Dmytro Volodymyrovych Hnap; born 19 December 1977) is a Ukrainian journalist at Slidstvo.Info and Hromadske.TV. His work focuses on corruption and crime.

== Biography ==
In 2014, he and other journalists collaborated to preserve documents found at the Mezhyhirya Residence after President Viktor Yanukovych fled Ukraine. Hnap won the main award at the 2015 Mezhyhirya Festival for his investigative work.

In April 2016, a libel lawsuit was filed against him by Oleksandr Korniyets, one of the Ukrainian top prosecutors dubbed the "diamond prosecutors", previously suspected of taking bribes in what has been described as a witch hunt against many Hromadske journalists launched by Petro Poroshenko's supporters.

On 25 June 2018, Hnap announced he was leaving journalism to start a political career. He said he would take part in the 2019 Ukrainian parliamentary elections, and in primaries for a single liberal opposition candidate in the 2019 Ukrainian presidential election. He officially became a presidential candidate on February 8, 2019, nominated by the party Power of the People. Hnap continued to host his own political talk show "Right to the Truth" on "24 Channel". On 1 March he withdrew his candidacy in favour of supporting fellow candidate Anatoliy Hrytsenko. The following day Power of People officially withdraw Hap's candidacy. In the election Hrytsenko did not proceed to the second round of the election; in the first round he placed fifth with 6.91% of the votes.
