= Oleksandr Korniyets =

Ukrainian lawyer

Oleksandr Pavlovych Korniets (Ukrainian: Олександр Павлович Корнієць; 27 March 1972, in Kiev) is a Ukrainian lawyer. Deputy Prosecutor of Kiev region, he was arrested along with Volodymir Shapakin in early July 2015 accused of taking a bribe and after searches found important amounts of money and diamonds. The then dubbed "diamond prosecutors" were released on bail a few days later.

In April 2016 Korniyets filed a libel lawsuit against a Hromadske journalist, Dmytro Hnap in what has been described as a witch hunt launched by Petro Poroshenko's supporters.
