= Vodiane, Volnovakha Raion, Donetsk Oblast =

Vodiane Водяне
- Village
- Interactive map of Vodiane
- Location of Vodiane within Ukraine Vodiane (Donetsk Oblast)
- Coordinates: 47°49′19″N 37°18′24″E
- Country: Ukraine
- Oblast: Donetsk Oblast
- Raion: Volnovakha Raion
- Hromada: Vuhledar urban hromada
- Elevation: 181 m (594 ft)

Population (2001 census)
  - Total: 324
- Time zone: UTC+2 (EET)
  - Summer (DST): UTC+3 (EEST)
- Postal code: 85665
- Area code: +380 6278
- KATOTTH: UA14040050040031750

Vodiane (Ukrainian: Водяне; Russian: Водяное) is a village in Vuhledar urban hromada, Volnovakha Raion, Donetsk Oblast, eastern Ukraine. It is located 42.84 kilometres (26.62 mi) southwest by west (SWbW) from the centre of Donetsk city.

== History ==
=== Russian invasion of Ukraine ===
The village was captured by Russian Forces in September 2024, during the full-scale Russian invasion of Ukraine.

== Demographics ==
As of the 2001 Ukrainian census, the settlement had 324 inhabitants, whose native languages were 15.79% Ukrainian, 84.21% Russian and 0.31% Belarusian.

== See also ==
- List of villages in Donetsk Oblast
