= Bohoiavlenka =

Bohoiavlenka Богоявленка
- Village
- Interactive map of Bohoiavlenka
- Bohoiavlenka shown within Ukraine Bohoiavlenka (Donetsk Oblast)
- Coordinates: 47°51′49″N 37°12′54″E
- Country: Ukraine
- Oblast: Donetsk Oblast
- Raion: Volnovakha Raion
- Hromada: Vuhledar urban hromada
- Founded: 1836
- Elevation: 127 m (417 ft)

Population (2001)
  - Total: 1,490
- Postal code: 85643
- Area code: +380 6278

Bohoiavlenka (Ukrainian: Богоявленка) is a village in Vuhledar urban hromada, Volnovakha Raion, Donetsk Oblast, Ukraine. It is located 14 kilometers from Vuhledar. The population was 1,490 in the 2001 Ukrainian census.

== History ==
Under the Soviet Union, the village was the centre of a collective farm, led by Hero of Socialist Labour Dmitry Chernobay.

From 1966 to 2004, the village was named Dobrovillia.

=== Russo-Ukrainian War ===
The village has been shelled repeatedly throughout the Russian invasion of Ukraine. By December 2023, due to evacuation, the population had decreased to around 200. A local resident reported a lack of gas in the village and the continual deliverance of humanitarian aid to the population.

On 27 October 2024, the village was captured by Russian forces.

== Demographics ==
According to the 2001 Ukrainian census, the population of the village was 1,490 of which 92.89% stated Ukrainian to be their native language, 6.58% stated their native language to be Russian, and 0.34% to be Armenian.
