= Solodke, Donetsk Oblast =

Village in Donetsk Oblast, Ukraine

Solodke Солодке
- Village
- Interactive map of Solodke
- Location of Solodke within Ukraine Solodke (Ukraine)
- Coordinates: 47.788056°N 37.490278°E
- Country: Ukraine
- Oblast: Donetsk Oblast
- Raion: Volnovakha Raion
- Hromada: Vuhledar urban hromada
- Status: 2011
- Elevation: 194 m (636 ft)

Population (2001 census)
  - Total: 525
- Time zone: UTC+2 (EET)
  - Summer (DST): UTC+3 (EEST)
- Postal code: 85683
- Area code: +380 6278

Solodke (Ukrainian: Солодке; Russian: Сладкое, romanized: Sladkoye) is a village in Volnovakha Raion (district) in Donetsk Oblast of eastern Ukraine, at about 28.7 kilometres (17.8 mi) southwest by west from the centre of Donetsk city. It belongs to Vuhledar urban hromada, one of the hromadas of Ukraine.
