= Mykilske, Volnovakha Raion, Donetsk Oblast =

Village in Volnovakha Raion, Donetsk Oblast, Ukraine

Coordinates: 47°45′10″N 37°18′14″E

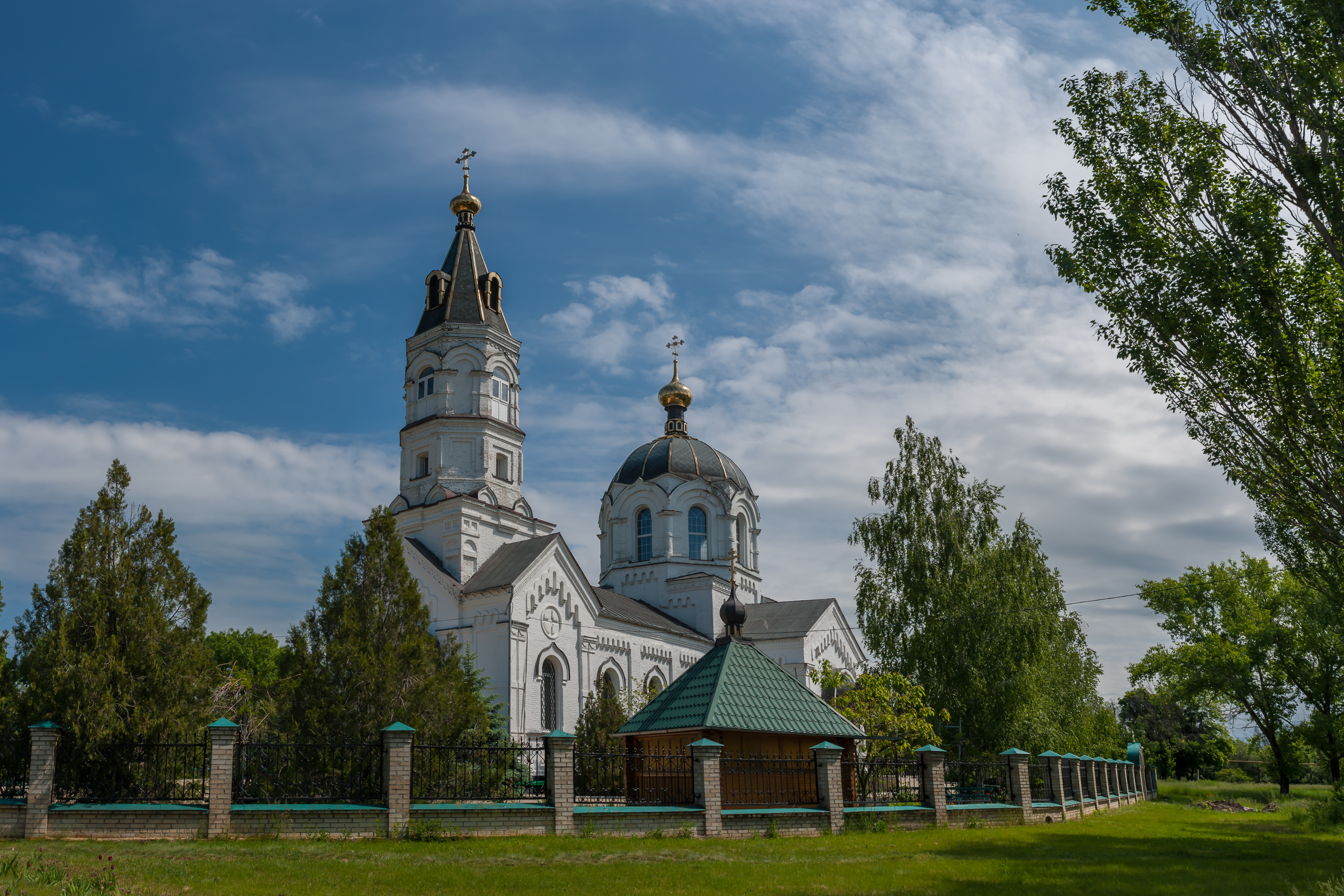

Mykilske (Ukrainian: Микільське; Russian: Никольское, romanized: Nikolskoye) is a village in Vuhledar urban hromada, Volnovakha Raion, Donetsk Oblast, Ukraine.

The village is known for housing the Vasylivka Men's Monastery. It also contains a cathedral personally consecrated by Patriarch Kirill of Moscow in 2009.

== Demographics ==
According to the 2001 Ukrainian census, the village had a population of 1922 people, of whom 81.27% natively spoke Ukrainian, 18.47% natively spoke Russian, and 0.05% natively spoke Romanian (referred to as "Moldovan") and Belarusian.
