= Power of the People =

Power of the People Сила людей
- Leader: Yuri Bova
- Founded: August 20, 2014
- Headquarters: Kyiv, Khreshchatyk
- Ideology: Liberalism; Pro-Europeanism
- Political position: Centre
- European affiliation: Alliance of Liberals and Democrats for Europe Party
- Colours: Blue; Yellow
- Verkhovna Rada: 0 / 450
- Regions: 0 / 43,122

Website
- www.sylalyudey.org

Power of the People (Ukrainian: Сила людей, romanized: Syla Lyudey, SL) is a Ukrainian liberal political party registered by the Ministry of Justice on 20 August 2014. On 8 February 2019, Dmytro Gnap was nominated as the party's candidate for the 2019 Ukrainian presidential election. On 1 March, Gnap withdrew his candidacy in favour of supporting fellow candidate Anatoliy Hrytsenko. The following day the party officially withdraw Gnap's candidacy.
