= Prechystivka =

Prechystivka Пречистівка
- Village
- Interactive map of Prechystivka
- Location of Prechystivka within Ukraine Prechystivka (Donetsk Oblast)
- Coordinates: 47°46′46″N 37°04′32″E
- Country: Ukraine
- Oblast: Donetsk Oblast
- Raion: Volnovakha Raion
- Hromada: Vuhledar urban hromada
- Elevation: 128 m (420 ft)

Population (2001 census)
  - Total: 563
- Time zone: UTC+2 (EET)
  - Summer (DST): UTC+3 (EEST)
- Postal code: 85620
- Area code: +380 6278

Prechystivka (Ukrainian: Пречистівка; Russian: Пречистовка, romanized: Prechistovka) is a village in Volnovakha Raion, Donetsk Oblast, eastern Ukraine. It is located approximately 73 kilometres (45 mi) from the city of Donetsk.

== History ==
Prechystivka is one of the 40 state-owned settlements established by state peasants, Ukrainian Cossacks, townspeople, and military settlers from Chernigov, Kharkiv, and Poltava Governorates, as well as western landowners (predominantly from Kyiv Governorate) in the early 1840s in the eastern part of Alexandrovsky District of Yekaterinoslav Governorate (now part of the modern Donetsk Oblast).

In early September 2024, Russian forces launched an attack on Prechystivka, and by 5 September, Russian forces were confirmed to have captured the village.
