= Novoukrainka, Vuhledar urban hromada, Volnovakha Raion, Donetsk Oblast =

Rural locality in Donetsk Oblast, Ukraine

Novoukrainka Новоукраїнка
- Village
- Interactive map of Novoukrainka
- Location of Novoukrainka within Ukraine Novoukrainka (Donetsk Oblast)
- Coordinates: 47°50′17″N 37°06′27″E
- Country: Ukraine
- Oblast: Donetsk Oblast
- Raion: Volnovakha Raion
- Hromada: Vuhledar urban hromada
- Elevation: 173 m (568 ft)

Population (2001 census)
  - Total: 1,522
- Time zone: UTC+2 (EET)
  - Summer (DST): UTC+3 (EEST)
- Postal code: 85640
- Area code: +380 6278
- KATOTTH: UA14040050080061341

Novoukrainka (Ukrainian: Новоукраїнка; Russian: Новоукраинка) is a village in Vuhledar urban hromada, Volnovakha Raion, Donetsk Oblast, eastern Ukraine. It is located 55.13 kilometres (34.26 mi) southwest by west (SWbW) from the centre of Donetsk city.

== History ==
=== Russian invasion of Ukraine ===
The village was captured by Russian forces in November 2024, during the full-scale Russian invasion of Ukraine.

== Demographics ==
As of the 2001 Ukrainian census, the settlement had 1522 inhabitants, whose native languages were 95.34% Ukrainian, 4.46% Russian and 0.07% both Belarusian and Greek (including Mariupol Greek and Urum).
