= Berezove, Volnovakha Raion, Donetsk Oblast =

Berezove Березове
- Village
- Interactive map of Berezove
- Location of Berezove within Ukraine Berezove (Donetsk Oblast)
- Coordinates: 47°46′24″N 37°34′53″E
- Country: Ukraine
- Oblast: Donetsk Oblast
- District: Volnovakha Raion
- Hromada: Vuhledar urban hromada
- Status: 2011
- Elevation: 196 m (643 ft)

Population (2001 census)
  - Total: 575
- Time zone: UTC+2 (EET)
  - Summer (DST): UTC+3 (EEST)
- Postal code: 85682
- Area code: +380 6278

Berezove (Ukrainian: Березове; Russian: Берёзовое) is a village in Volnovakha Raion (district) in Donetsk Oblast of eastern Ukraine, at about 36.00 kilometres (22.37 mi) southwest (SW) of the centre of Donetsk city. It belongs to Vuhledar urban hromada, one of the hromadas of Ukraine.

The War in Donbas, that started in mid-April 2014, brought both civilian and military casualties. In a clash between Ukrainian and pro-Russian troops, that took place near the village on 10 November 2014, three Ukrainian servicemen were killed and three others wounded. A 30-year-old female civilian was killed by explosion of a booby trap near the village on 8 September 2015. Two Ukrainian servicemen were killed near the village on 11 March 2017.

== Demographics ==
Native language as of the Ukrainian Census of 2001:

- Ukrainian 73.57%
- Russian 25.91%
- Greek (including Mariupol Greek and Urum) 0.35%
- Belarusian 0.17%
