= Vuhledar urban hromada =

Vuhledar urban hromada Вугледарська міська громада
- Hromada
- Interactive map of Vuhledar urban hromada
- Country: Ukraine
- Oblast: Donetsk
- Raion: Volnovakha

Area
  - Total: 596.5 km^{2} (230.3 sq mi)

Population (2020)
  - Total: 25,980
  - Density: 43.55/km^{2} (112.8/sq mi)
- Settlements: 15
- Cities: 1
- Villages: 14

Vuhledar urban hromada (Ukrainian: Вугледарська міська громада) is a hromada of Ukraine, located in Volnovakha Raion, Donetsk Oblast. Its administrative center is the city Vuhledar.

== Extent and composition ==
It has an area of 596.5 square kilometres (230.3 mi^{2}) and a population of 25,980, as of 2020.

The hromada contains 15 settlements: 1 city (Vuhledar) and 14 villages:

- Berezove
- Bohoiavlenka
- Maksymivka
- Mykilske
- Novoukrainka
- Pavlivka
- Petrivske
- Prechystivka
- Shevchenko
- Solodke
- Stepne
- Taramchuk
- Vodiane
- Yehorivka

== History ==
A May 2023 report by ReliefWeb stated that as a result of the Battle of Vuhledar during the Russian invasion of Ukraine, Vuhledar urban hromada had only 1,100 civilians left out of a pre-war population of 26,000. Most of the civilians are elderly, and all services like food, water, electricity, and healthcare are nonexistent.

== See also ==
- List of hromadas of Ukraine
