= Novomykhailivka, Kharkiv Oblast =

Village in Kharkiv Oblast, Ukraine

Novomykhailivka Новомихайлівка
- Location of Novomykhailivka Novomykhailivka (Ukraine)
- Coordinates: 49°13′32″N 35°57′54″E
- Country: Ukraine
- Oblast: Kharkiv Oblast
- Raion: Krasnohrad Raion
- Elevation: 153 m (502 ft)

Population (2001)
  - Total: 177
- Postal code: 64031
- Area code: +380 5762
- Climate: Cfa

Novomykhailivka (Ukrainian: Новомихайлівка) is a village in Krasnohrad Raion, Kharkiv Oblast (province) of Ukraine.

Until 18 July 2020, Novomykhailivka was located in Sakhnovschyna Raion. The raion was abolished on 18 July 2020 as part of the administrative reform of Ukraine, which reduced the number of raions of Kharkiv Oblast to seven. The area of Sakhnovschyna Raion was merged into Krasnohrad Raion.
