= Taramchuk =

Taramchuk Тарамчук
- Village
- Interactive map of Taramchuk
- Location of Taramchuk within Ukraine Taramchuk (Donetsk Oblast)
- Coordinates: 47°48′18″N 37°34′36″E
- Country: Ukraine
- Oblast: Donetsk Oblast
- Raion: Volnovakha Raion
- Hromada: Vuhledar urban hromada
- Founded: 1928
- Elevation: 193 m (633 ft)

Population (2001 census)
  - Total: 197
- Time zone: UTC+2 (EET)
  - Summer (DST): UTC+3 (EEST)
- Postal code: 85665
- Area code: +380 6278

Taramchuk (Ukrainian: Тарамчук; Russian: Тарамчук) is a village in Volnovakha Raion (district) in Donetsk Oblast of eastern Ukraine, at 33.9 km SW from the centre of Donetsk city.

The War in Donbas, that started in mid-April 2014, has brought along both civilian and military casualties.

== Demographics ==
Native language as of the Ukrainian Census of 2001:

- Ukrainian: 68.02%
- Russian: 31.47%
- Belarusian: 0.51%
