= Vuhledar =

City in Donetsk Oblast, Ukraine

Vuhledar: Вугледар (Ukrainian); Угледар (Russian)
- City
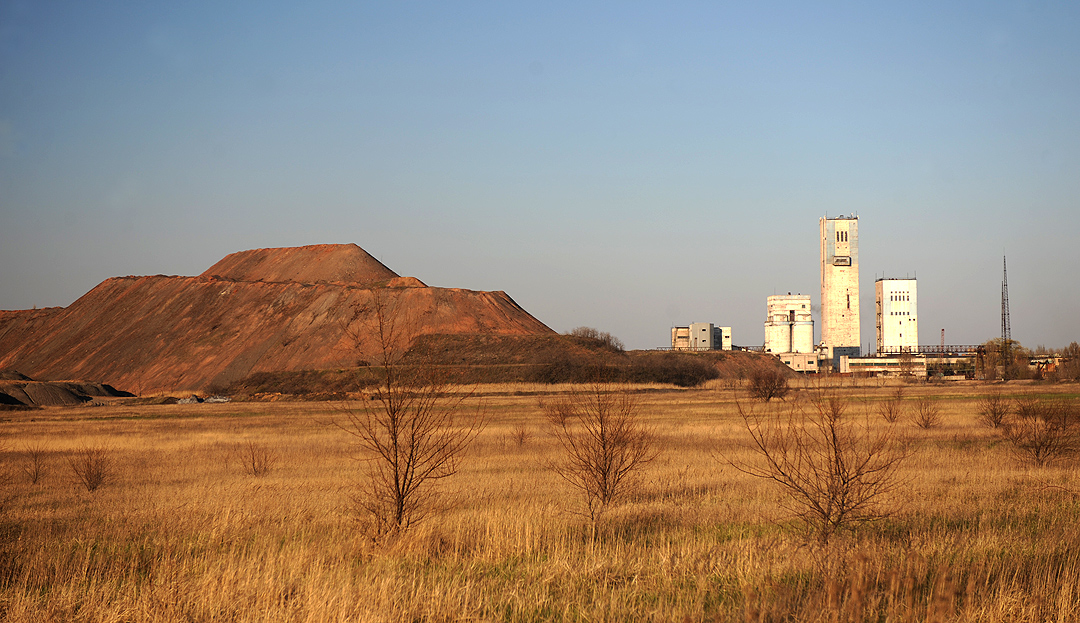
- The Pivdennodonbaska 1 coal mine

- Flag Coat of arms
- Interactive map of Vuhledar
- Vuhledar shown within Donetsk Vuhledar shown within Ukraine
- Coordinates: 47°46′45″N 37°14′54″E
- Country: Ukraine
- Oblast: Donetsk Oblast
- Raion: Volnovakha Raion
- Hromada: Vuhledar urban hromada
- Founded: 1964

Area
  - Total: 5.3 km^{2} (2.0 sq mi)
- Elevation: 187 m (614 ft)

Population (2023)
  - Total: 100 (approx.) ▼
  - Density: 19/km^{2} (49/sq mi)
- In January 2022, prior to the Russian invasion, it was 14,144.
- Postal code: 85670-85671
- Area code: +380-6273
- Climate: Warm summer subtype
- KOATUU: 1414800000
- Website: vugledar-rada.gov.ua (archived)

Vuhledar (Ukrainian: Вугледар, IPA: [wʊɦleˈdɑr]; Russian: Угледар, romanized: Ugledar, IPA: [ʊɡlʲɪˈdar]), is a city in Volnovakha Raion, Donetsk Oblast, eastern Ukraine. It is the administrative center of Vuhledar urban hromada. At the beginning of 2022, its population was 14,144.

Vuhledar is a coal mining city in the cultural and economic Donbas region of eastern Ukraine, with its origins in the 1960s development of the coal industry in the region. It was planned to be a major economic center, but failed to meet expectations, and has remained a minor economic node in the 21st century.

For more than two years beginning in March 2022 during the Russian invasion of Ukraine, Vuhledar was the site of fighting. The battle for the city almost completely destroyed and depopulated it, with reportedly less than 500 civilians remaining in the city in early 2023. The city has been under Russian occupation since October 2024.

== Geography ==
Vuhledar is located on an elevated plain that is by far the highest point in the area. It is located close to the administrative border where Donetsk Oblast ends.

Vuhledar is located 57 km (35 mi) from the city of Donetsk, the administrative centre of Donetsk Oblast, and 20 km (12 mi) south of Marinka.

== History ==
=== 20th century ===
In the 1960s, during the Soviet era, the Donbas coal basin south of the major industrial city of Donetsk was beginning to be developed. The settlement that would later be known as Vuhledar was founded around the Pivdennodonbaska 1 coal mine in 1964. It was originally an urban-type settlement named Pivdennyi Donetsk, meaning "South Donetsk".

Young people were brought to Pivdennyi Donetsk from cities all over the country to work on the new coal industry. There were Soviet plans to transform Pivdennyi Donetsk into a huge industrial center, but the plans were not fulfilled. Rather than the goal of achieving a population of 100,000, it only reached 15,000–17,000. Rather than ten mines being built, only two were built. A local described Vuhledar as an "unfinished project".

In 1969, Pivdennyi Donetsk was renamed Vuhledar, which means "gift of coal". However, even as late as 2023, there were still some older residents who referred to Vuhledar as "Pivdenne", or "Southern", as they were still accustomed to the old name.

Following the devolution of the Soviet Union in 1991, Vuhledar received city status, and became a city of regional significance in Ukraine.

=== 21st century ===
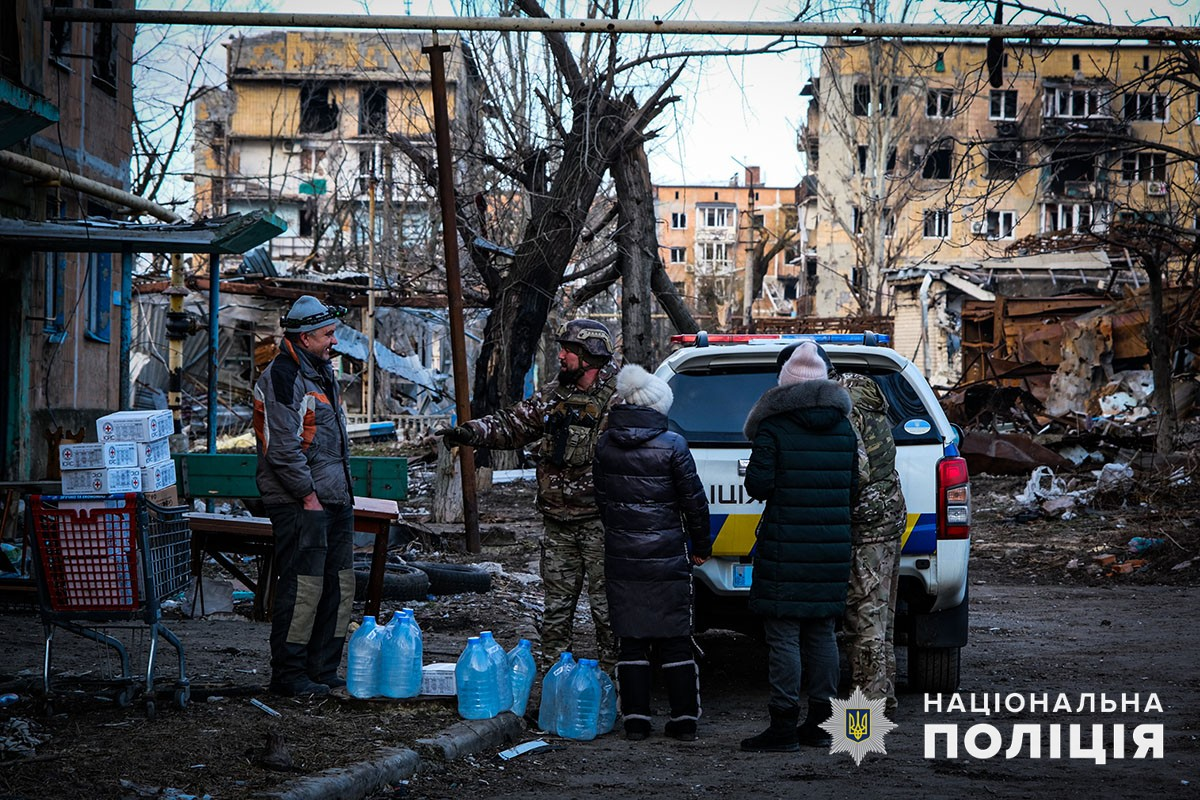
Police delivers food and water to citizens of destroyed Vuhledar, February 2024

During the war in Donbas after 2014, many miners from Vuhledar enlisted in the Ukrainian Armed Forces, fought and died during the war. However, the city did not see any actual fighting until 2022.

On 24 February 2022, Russia launched a full-scale invasion of Ukraine. On the day the invasion began, Vuhledar was hit by a Russian ballistic missile carrying a cluster munition. The missile struck outside a hospital and killed four civilians and injured another 10.

==== Battle of Vuhledar ====
In early 2023, Russian forces attacked Vuhledar anew. A major Russian attempt to take Vuhledar in February 2023 ended in disaster with "heavy losses and humiliation"; General Rustam Muradov was dismissed after the failed offensive.

The battle had a severe humanitarian impact on Vuhledar. The city was devastated. Vuhledar's deputy mayor Maksym Verbovsky said that Vuhledar "was destroyed", with "one hundred percent of the buildings damaged;" fewer than 500 civilians, and only one child, remained in the city once populated with 15,000 residents.

In September 2024, a renewed offensive to capture Vuhledar led to its semi-encirclement and a Russian assault on the city. On 1 October, the city was captured by Russian forces.

== Economy ==
The Pivdennodonbaska 1 coal mine in Vuhledar is one of the largest coal reserves in Ukraine, having estimated reserves of 69.3 million tonnes. The Pivdennodonbaska 3 coal mine, also in Vuhledar, is even larger, with estimated reserves of 156.9 million tonnes. Due to the crisis after the dissolution of the Soviet Union, the growth of the city stopped, and eight planned mines were cancelled, including Pivdennodonbaska 2 coal mine.

As of 2013, the majority of people in the town worked in one of the coal mines or nearby factories.

== Education ==
Prior to 2023, the city contained three secondary schools.

== Demographics ==
Population history

Year	Pop.	±%
1970	2,179	—
1979	7,382	+238.8%
1989	18,658	+152.7%
1992	20,500	+9.9%
1998	19,200	−6.3%
2001	17,440	−9.2%
2003	16,918	−3.0%
2004	16,580	−2.0%
2005	16,286	−1.8%
2006	16,068	−1.3%
2007	15,886	−1.1%
2008	15,785	−0.6%
2009	15,696	−0.6%
2010	15,641	−0.4%
2011	15,497	−0.9%

Year	Pop.	±%
2012	15,477	−0.1%
2013	15,357	−0.8%
2014	15,294	−0.4%
2015	15,267	−0.2%
2016	15,195	−0.5%
2017	15,188	−0.0%
2018	15,025	−1.1%
2019	14,822	−1.4%
2020	14,616	−1.4%
2021	14,432	−1.3%
2022	14,144	−2.0%
2023	100	−99.3%
2024	104	+4.0%
2025	25	−76.0%

As of the 2001 Ukrainian census, Vuhledar's population was 17,440. Ethnically, the city has a majority of Ukrainians (63.1%), with a large minority of Russians (33.1%) and a small minority of Belarusians (1.0%). Linguistically, the majority of the city's population speaks Russian as a native language (70.8%), with minorities natively speaking Ukrainian (28.2%) and Belarusian (0.1%). The exact ethnic and linguistic composition was as follows:

Ethnic groups in Vuhledar
	percent
Ukrainians	63.14%
Russians	33.05%
Belarusians	0.96%
Ukrainian Greeks	0.53%
Tatars	0.37%
Moldovans	0.22%
Georgians	0.17%
Azerbaijanis	0.13%
Armenians	0.11%

Native languages in Vuhledar
	percent
Russian	70.8%
Ukrainian	28.2%
Belarusian	0.1%
others	0.3%

=== Religion ===
The city has multiple religious communities, including Ukrainian Orthodox Church (Moscow Patriarchate) followers, Jehovah's Witnesses, Pentecostals, and Evangelical Baptist Christians.

== Notable people ==
- Dmytro Hnap (born 1977), Ukrainian anti-corruption journalist and politician (Power of the People)
- Dmytro Khomchenovskyi (born 16 April 1990), footballer
- Anastasiya Lysenko (born 2 December 1995), weightlifter
