= Pavlivka, Volnovakha Raion, Donetsk Oblast =

Village in Donetsk Oblast, Ukraine

Pavlivka Павлівка
- Village
- Interactive map of Pavlivka
- Location within Donetsk Oblast Location within Ukraine
- Coordinates: 47°45′16″N 37°13′05″E
- Country: Ukraine
- Oblast: Donetsk Oblast
- Raion: Volnovakha Raion
- Hromada: Vuhledar urban hromada
- Time zone: UTC+2 (EET)
  - Summer (DST): UTC+3 (EEST)

Pavlivka (Ukrainian: Павлівка; Russian: Павловка) is a village in Volnovakha Raion, Donetsk Oblast, Ukraine. The population as of 2021 is 2,505 people, and the body of local self-government is the Vuhledar urban hromada.

== Geography ==
The village is located in western Donetsk Oblast, and is part of the Wild Fields that encompasses much of eastern and central Ukraine. The Kashlahach River runs through the village. The village is about 18 mi NW of the raion capital of Volnovakha, and 32 mi SW of the oblast capital of Donetsk. The village is a settlement on the T-0509 Highway, which runs in the western parts of the oblast.

== History ==
Cossacks, mostly from Poltava, Chernihiv, and Kharkiv Governorates, established this village in the 1830s.

In 1897, the Russian Empire Census recorded a population of 3,137 in the village.

Until 1917, Pavlivka was a major administrative, industrial, and commercial center in Mariupol Uyezd, second only to Mariupol itself. The village housed a steam mill, a brick factory, and several leather processing companies, in addition to a hospital and three schools.

As a result of the German-Soviet War, the German military occupied the village for about two years. During the occupation, Soviet partisans were working in the village, but German forces discovered their operations, and the partisans were subsequently eliminated.

=== Russian invasion of Ukraine ===
After the Russian invasion of Ukraine, Ukraine's 53rd Mechanized Brigade withdrew from the village by mid-March and recaptured it on 21 June 2022. As of November 2022, during the Russo-Ukrainian War, the village was on the frontline, and changed hands multiple times.

== Demographics ==
According to the 2001 Ukrainian Census, the distribution of the native languages of the population are as below:

- Ukrainian – 85.51%
- Russian – 13.97%
- Belarusian – 0.32%
- Moldovan (Romanian) – 0.16%
- Romanian – 0.04%
