= Novomykhailivka =

Novomykhailivka (Ukrainian: Новомихайлівка), may refer to several places in Ukraine:

== Dnipropetrovsk Oblast ==
- Novomykhailivka, Sofiyivka Raion, a village in Sofiyivka Raion
- Novomykhailivka, Tomakivka Raion, a village in Tomakivka Raion

== Donetsk Oblast ==
- Novomykhailivka, Kalmiuske Raion, Donetsk Oblast, a village in Kalmiuske Raion
- Novomykhailivka, Kramatorsk Raion, Donetsk Oblast, a village in Kramatorsk Raion
- Novomykhailivka, Pokrovsk Raion, Donetsk Oblast, a village in Pokrovsk Raion

== Kherson Oblast ==
- Novomykhailivka, Kherson Oblast, a village in Henichesk Raion

== Kharkiv Oblast ==
- Novomykhailivka, Kharkiv Oblast, a village in Sakhnovshchyna Raion

== Kirovohrad Oblast ==
- Novomykhailivka, Dobrovelychkivka Raion, a village in Dobrovelychkivka Raion
- Novomykhailivka, Dolynska Raion, a village in Dolynska Raion
- Novomykhailivka, Mala Vyska Raion, a village in Mala Vyska Raion

== Mykolaiv Oblast ==
- Novomykhailivka, Bashtanka Raion, Mykolaiv Oblast, a village in Bashtanka Raion
- Novomykhailivka, Mykolaiv Raion, Mykolaiv Oblast, a village in Mykolaiv Raion
- Novomykhailivka, Pervomaisk Raion, a village in Pervomaisk Raion

== Odesa Oblast ==
- Novomykhailivka, Podilsk Raion, Odesa Oblast, a village in Podilsk Raion
- Novomykhailivka, Bilhorod-Dnistrovskyi Raion, Odesa Oblast, a village in Bilhorod-Dnistrovskyi Raion

== Sumy Oblast ==
- Novomykhailivka, Sumy Oblast, a village in Sumy Raion

== Zaporizhzhia Oblast ==
- Novomykhailivka, Berdiansk Raion, Zaporizhzhia Oblast, a village in Berdiansk Raion
- Novomykhailivka, Zaporizhzhia Raion, Zaporizhzhia Oblast, a village in Zaporizhzhia Raion
