= Andrii Verkhohliad =

Ukrainian serviceman (1995–2022)

Hero of Ukraine Andrii Verkhohliad
- Андрій Верхогляд

Personal details
- Born: 18 April 1995 Rava-Ruska, Lviv Oblast, Ukraine
- Died: 22 June 2022 (aged 27) Vidrodzhennia, Donetsk Oblast, Ukraine
- Education: Hetman Petro Sahaidachnyi National Ground Forces Academy
- Nickname: Лівша (Livsha)

Military service
- Allegiance: Ukraine
- Branch/service: Ukrainian Ground Forces; Mechanized Infantry; Operational Command North; 72nd Mechanized Brigade
- Rank: Lieutenant colonel
- Battles/wars: Russo-Ukrainian War; War in Donbas; Battle of Avdiivka; Russian invasion of Ukraine; Battle of Kyiv; Battle of Donbas; Battle of Svitlodarsk
- Awards: Order of Bohdan Khmelnytsky

Andrii Leonidovych Verkhohliad (Ukrainian: Андрій Леонідович Верхогляд; 18 April 1995 – 22 June 2022) was a Ukrainian serviceman, lieutenant colonel (posthumously), battalion commander of the 72nd Mechanized Brigade of the Armed Forces of Ukraine, participant of the Russian-Ukrainian war. Hero of Ukraine (2022, posthumously).

== Biography ==
He moved to Novohrad-Volynskyi (now Zviahel) at the age of five with his family. Here he studied at the collegium (now Lyceum No. 11).

His grandfather, father, and brother are military men.

In 2016, he graduated from the Hetman Petro Sahaidachnyi National Ground Forces Academy with a degree in "Management of actions of mechanized troops".

On 16 March 2016 he arrived in the area of the anti-terrorist operation. Then he was appointed commander of the 1st platoon of the 2nd mechanized company of the 1st mechanized battalion of the 72nd mechanized brigade. In April of the same year, together with the battalion, he participated in the international Rapid Trident exercise in Starychi, Lviv Oblast. He received numerous shrapnel wounds. After 2 months he returned to combat duties (some of the shrapnel remained in his body).

At the end of January 2017, his unit repelled an attack by an enemy sabotage and reconnaissance group in the industrial zone of Avdiivka. Together with an assault group led by A. Kyzyl, they captured an enemy stronghold.

At the beginning of the full-scale Russian invasion of Ukraine in 2022, he was a member of the 72nd Separate Mechanized Brigade defending the approaches to the cities of Boryspil and Brovary in Kyiv Oblast.

He was the organizer of the defense near the settlements of Hoholeva and Rusanova (both in Kyiv Oblast), which led to the retreat of the enemy and prevented it from advancing to Kyiv. Thanks to his professional actions, enemy personnel and armored vehicles were destroyed.

On 22 June 2022, he began to command a combined assault group to restore lost positions near the village of Vershyna, Bakhmut Raion, Donetsk Oblast. During the battle, enemy personnel were eliminated, a radio station was captured and the front line of defense was restored. On the same day, Andriy Verkhoglyad was ambushed and killed in action by a bullet wound. His body was recovered from the battlefield only 10 days later.

He is survived by his parents, wife and daughter.

He was buried on 9 July 2022 in Zviahel, Zhytomyr Oblast.

== Awards ==
- the title of Hero of Ukraine with the Order of the Golden Star (11 December 2022, posthumously)
- Order of Bohdan Khmelnytsky, 2nd (26 March 2022) and 3rd (1 February 2017) degrees.
- Order of the People's Hero of Ukraine (14 September 2017)
- badges of honor "For Achievements in Military Service" of the II degree (2016) and "For Military Valor" (2018)
- medals "For Conscientious Service" (2018), "Award of the National Security and Defense Council of Ukraine", first class (2020)

== Honoring the memory ==
On June 20, 2023, the Kyiv City Council renamed Mykhailo Drahomyrov Street to Andrii Verkhohliad Street.

A memorial plaque will be installed in Zvyagel.
