= Midna Ruda =

Village in Donetsk Oblast, Ukraine

Midna Ruda Мідна Руда
- Village
- Location within Donetsk Oblast Location within Ukraine
- Coordinates: 48°33′8″N 38°12′17″E
- Country: Ukraine
- Oblast: Donetsk Oblast
- Raion: Bakhmut Raion
- Hromada: Bakhmut urban hromada

Population
  - Total: 9 people
- Time zone: UTC+2 (EET)
- Area code: 8GWWH634+WX

Midna Ruda is a village (selo) in Bakhmut Raion, Donetsk Oblast, Ukraine. It is considered "Bakhmut's coal mine." During the 2022 Russian Invasion of Ukraine, Midna Ruda was captured by Russian and DPR forces.

== History ==
Midna Ruda and the nearby village of Klynove was one of the main focuses of Russia during the Donbas Offensive. It was at the doorstep of Sievierodonetsk and after Russian forces took the city of Svitlodarsk, on 26 May, Russian forces captured Midna Ruda.
