= Opytne =

Opytne (Ukrainian: Опитне) may refer to several places in Ukraine:

- Opytne, Bakhmut Raion, Donetsk Oblast
- Opytne, Pokrovsk Raion, Donetsk Oblast
