= Vesela Dolyna, Bakhmut Raion, Donetsk Oblast =

Village in Donetsk Oblast, Ukraine

Vesela Dolyna Весела Долина
- Village
- Location of Vesela Dolyna Vesela Dolyna (Ukraine)
- Coordinates: 48°32′59″N 38°03′52″E
- Country: Ukraine
- Oblast: Donetsk Oblast
- Raion: Bakhmut Raion
- Hromada: Bakhmut urban hromada
- Elevation: 148 m (486 ft)

Population (2001)
  - Total: 277
- Postal code: 84570
- Area code: +380 6274
- Climate: Cfa

Vesela Dolyna (Ukrainian: Весела Долина) is a village in Bakhmut Raion, Donetsk Oblast (province) of Ukraine, currently under control of the Russian Armed Forces.

On 6 October 2022, the Wagner Group took control over the village, as well as the nearby villages of Odradivka and Zaitseve, as part of their Bakhmut offensive.
