= Verkhohliad =

Verkhohliad is a surname. Notable people with the surname include:

- Andrii Verkhohliad (1995–2022), Ukrainian serviceman
- Daryna Verkhohliad (born 1992), Ukrainian rower
