= Zelenopillia =

Zelenopillia (Ukrainian: Зеленопі́лля) may refer to:

- Zelenopillia, Donetsk Oblast
- Zelenopillia, Luhansk Oblast
  - Zelenopillia rocket attack
