= Zarichne =

Zarichne may refer to the following localities in Ukraine:

- Zarichne, Rivne Oblast, a town in Varash Raion
- Zarichne, Donetsk Oblast, a town in Kramatorsk Raion until 2016 known as Kirovsk
- Zarichne, Dnipropetrovsk Oblast, a settlement in Samar Raion till 2024 known as Hvardiiske
- Zarichne Raion, Rivne oblast

== See also ==
- Zarichne barracks airstrike
