= Bakhmut urban hromada =

Bakhmut urban hromada Бахмутська міська громада
- Hromada
- Flag Coat of arms
- Interactive map of Bakhmut urban hromada
- Country: Ukraine
- Oblast: Donetsk Oblast
- Raion: Bakhmut Raion

Area
  - Total: 438.57 km^{2} (169.33 sq mi)
- Settlements: 19
- Cities: 1
- Rural settlements: 5
- Villages: 13

Bakhmut urban hromada (Ukrainian: Бахмутська міська громада) is a hromada of Ukraine, located in Bakhmut Raion, Donetsk Oblast. Its administrative center is the city Bakhmut.

It was founded on 26 June 2019, from the merger of local village councils in Bakhmut Raion. The hromada has an international partnership with Saldus Municipality in Latvia.

== Composition ==
The hromada contains 19 settlements: 1 city (Bakhmut), 5 rural settlements: Khromove, Krasna Hora, Opytne, Yahidne, and Zelenopillia.

And 13 villages:

- Andriivka
- Berkhivka
- Ivanhrad
- Ivanivske
- Klishchiivka
- Klynove
- Midna Ruda
- Nova Kamianka
- Pokrovske
- Vershyna
- Vesela Dolyna
- Vidrodzhennia
- Zaitseve

== See also ==
- List of hromadas of Ukraine
