= Khromov =

Khromov (Russian: Хромов) is a Russian masculine surname, its feminine counterpart is Khromova. It may refer to

- Danil Khromov (born 2002), Russian footballer
- Margarita Ponomaryova (born 1963, also known as Margarita Khromova), Russian hurdler
- Nikita Khromov (1892–1934), Russian footballer
- Valentin Khromov (1933-2020), Russian poet

== See also ==
- Khromove, a placename derived from the surname
