= Khromove =

Village in Donetsk Oblast, Ukraine

Khromove Хромове
- Rural settlement
- Interactive map of Khromove
- Location within Donetsk Oblast Location within Ukraine
- Coordinates: 48°36′0″N 37°56′45″E
- Country: Ukraine
- Oblast: Donetsk Oblast
- Raion: Bakhmut Raion
- Hromada: Bakhmut urban hromada

Area
  - Total: 0.25 km^{2} (0.097 sq mi)

Population (2001 census)
  - Total: 1,054
  - Density: 4,200/km^{2} (11,000/sq mi)

Khromove (Ukrainian: Хромове; Russian: Хромово, romanized: Khromovo) is a rural-type settlement in eastern Ukraine, located in Bakhmut urban hromada, Bakhmut Raion, Donetsk Oblast. Before 2016, it was known as Artemivske (Ukrainian: Арте́мівське; Russian: Артёмовское, romanized: Artyomovskoye). Since November 2023, it has been under Russian control.

== Geography ==
Khromove is a small settlement. Before the Russian invasion of Ukraine that heavily damaged the infrastructure of Khromove, it consisted of "a few streets of several dozen houses". It is a suburb of Bakhmut. It has an area of 0.25 square kilometres (0.097 mi^{2}).

== History ==
Khromove is the historical name of the settlement. In the mid-19th century, the farm on a hill near modern Khromove was bought by a merchant with the surname "Khromov", from which the name of the settlement is derived. The settlement was renamed to Artemivske by the government of the Soviet Union. On 19 May 2016, Artemivske was renamed to Khromove as part of decommunization in Ukraine.

=== Russo-Ukrainian War ===
==== Russian invasion of Ukraine ====
In early 2023, during the Russian invasion of Ukraine, Khromove was attacked by Russian forces as part of the battle of Bakhmut. The Russian attacks destroyed much of the village, including civilian buildings. Control of Khromove would allow Russian forces to cut off Ukrainian supply lines to Bakhmut and assault nearby Chasiv Yar. Khromove, along with all other suburbs of Bakhkmut, was "completely destroyed by months of relentless artillery fire and urban combat".

On 29 November 2023, Russia's Ministry of Defence stated that Russian forces had captured Khromove. Ukraine did not immediately give comment and Reuters could not independently verify the claim at the time. The settlement was later confirmed captured by DeepStateMap.Live.

== Demographics ==
According to the 2001 Ukrainian Census, the population of the settlement was 1054. Of these, 59.68% spoke Ukrainian, 38.52% spoke Russian, and 1.8% spoke other languages.
