= Krasna Hora =

Rural settlement in Donetsk Oblast, Ukraine

Krasna Hora Красна Гора
- Rural settlement
- Interactive map of Krasna Hora
- Location of Krasna Hora within Donetsk Oblast Krasna Hora (Ukraine)
- Coordinates: 48°39′52″N 38°01′06″E
- Country: Ukraine
- Oblast: Donetsk Oblast
- Raion: Bakhmut Raion
- Hromada: Bakhmut urban hromada

Area
  - Total: 1.64 km^{2} (0.63 sq mi)
- Elevation: 113 m (371 ft)

Population (2022)
  - Total: 584
  - Density: 356/km^{2} (922/sq mi)
- Time zone: UTC+2 (EET)
  - Summer (DST): UTC+3 (EEST)
- Postal code: 84536
- Area code: +380 6274

Krasna Hora (Ukrainian: Красна Гора; Russian: Красная Гора, romanized: Krasnaya Gora) is a rural settlement in Bakhmut Raion, Donetsk Oblast, eastern Ukraine. The name is derived from the local red clay deposit used in bricks production. Administratively, it is part of Bakhmut urban hromada, one of the hromadas of Ukraine. Population: 584 (2022 estimate). Since 2023, it has been under Russian occupation.

== History ==
=== 20th century ===
Krasna Hora originated from a ceramics factory named "Krasna Hora" built in 1906. Initially, only seasonal employees worked in the plant, but by the 1930s, barracks were built for permanent workers to live there. These workers were migrants from Kharkiv Oblast to the north. During World War II, the Krasna Hora factory was occupied by Nazi Germany between October 1941 and September 1943 and was completely destroyed. It was eventually restored in 1944. Actual houses began to be built in the area in 1949, and it received official rural settlement status in 1964 under the name Krasna Hora.

=== 21st century ===
On 30 October 2014, the Cabinet of Ministers of Ukraine placed Krasna Hora on a list of settlements within the Anti-Terrorist Operation Zone, a term used to identify Ukrainian territory occupied by Russian forces and their proxies during the war in Donbas.

During the eastern Ukraine campaign of the full-scale Russian invasion of Ukraine, Krasna Hora was attacked by Russian forces. By summer of 2022, electricity and water services were completely knocked out. There were still many elderly people living in the village then. Krasna Hora came under direct assault amid the battles for Soledar and Bakhmut. Geolocated footage from 11 February 2023 showed Russian troops walking around freely in parts of the town, indicating that Ukrainian troops likely withdrew from the settlement.

== Education ==
There is a kindergarten in the town.

== Demographics ==
Historical population
Year	1970	1979	1989	2001	2022
Pop.	800	800	700	690	584
±%	—	+0.0%	−12.5%	−1.4%	−15.4%
