= Nova Kamianka, Donetsk Oblast =

Village in Donetsk oblast, Ukraine

Nova Kamianka Нова Кам'янка
- Village
- Location within Donetsk Oblast Location within Ukraine
- Coordinates: 48°39′59″N 38°8′31″E
- Oblast: Donetsk Oblast
- Raion: Bakhmut Raion
- Hromada: Bakhmut urban hromada
- Elevation: 102 m (335 ft)

Population
  - Total: 11
- Postal code: 84561

Nova Kamianka (Ukrainian: Нова Кам'янка) is a village in Bakhmut urban hromada, Bakhmut Raion, Donetsk Oblast, Ukraine. According to the 2001 census, it had a population of 14.

According to Ukrainian sources it has seen shelling of both military and civilian infrastructure by Russian forces during the battle of Bakhmut.
