= Novoluhanske =

Novoluhanske Новолуганське
- Rural settlement
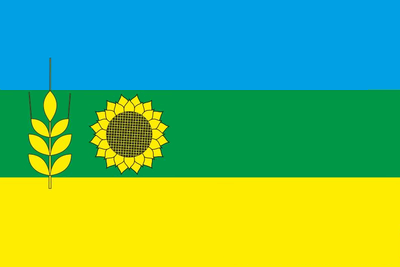
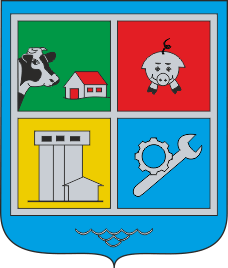
- Flag Coat of arms
- Interactive map of Novoluhanske
- Location of Novoluhanske within Ukraine Novoluhanske (Ukraine)
- Coordinates: 48.431667°N 38.174722°E
- Country: Ukraine
- Oblast: Donetsk Oblast
- District: Bakhmut Raion
- Hromada: Svitlodarsk urban hromada
- Founded: 1930
- Elevation: 205 m (673 ft)

Population (2001 census)
  - Total: >3,700
- Time zone: UTC+2 (EET)
  - Summer (DST): UTC+3 (EEST)
- Postal code: 84573
- Area code: +380 6274

Novoluhanske (Ukrainian: Новолуганське; Russian: Новолуганское) is a rural settlement in Bakhmut Raion, Donetsk Oblast, eastern Ukraine, at 56.2 km NE from the centre of Donetsk city, on the bank of the Luhan River, opposite to Svitlodarsk.

== Russo-Ukrainian War ==
The War in Donbas that started in mid-April 2014 has brought along both civilian and military casualties. Since the war started, Novoluhanske was considered no man's land and neither Ukrainian nor separatist forces were permanently stationed there. This situation lasted until January 2017, when the town was captured by the Ukrainian army without resistance. The Ukrainian government has since then been in control of the town, though sporadic fighting continues. Two Ukrainian servicemen were killed near the village on 27 March 2017.

On 18 December 2017, about 50 buildings, including a school, a kindergarten and a health post were damaged by an attack on the village of by Grad multiple rocket launchers. Eight people (including a six-year-old girl) were wounded as a result of the attack.

On 7 June 2019, two Ukrainian servicemen were killed, four were wounded, and four were injured. On 21 February 2022, a civilian died during a bombardment of Novoluhanske. Infrastructure facilities were damaged by the shelling and the village was left without electricity and heating.

Novoluhanske was reported to have been captured by Russian forces on 25 July 2022, during the Eastern Ukraine offensive of the 2022 Russian invasion of Ukraine.

== Demographics ==
Reportedly in December 2017 more than 3,700 people lived in Novoluhanske, including over 500 children.

Native language as of the Ukrainian Census of 2001:

- Ukrainian — 32.61%
- Russian 66.01%
