= Zelenopillia, Donetsk Oblast =

Coordinates: 48°28′18″N 37°57′44″E

Zelenopillia (Ukrainian: Зеленопі́лля) is a rural-type settlement in Bakhmut hromada, Bakhmut Raion, Donetsk Oblast, Ukraine.

According to the 2001 Ukrainian census, it had a population of 316.

The village has a local library.
