= Zarichne, Rivne Oblast =

Rural locality in Rivne Oblast, Ukraine

Zarichne Зарічне
- Rural settlement
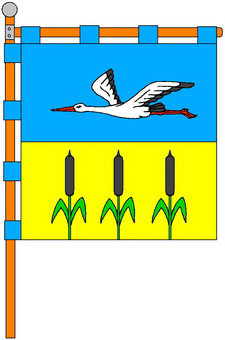
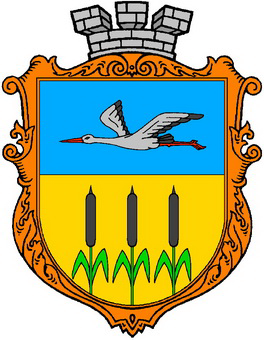
- Flag Coat of arms

- Location of Zarichne in Rivne Oblast Location of Zarichne in Ukraine
- Coordinates: 51°49′32″N 26°08′34″E
- Country: Ukraine
- Oblast: Rivne Oblast
- Raion: Varash Raion
- Hromada: Zarichne settlement hromada
- Founded: September 27, 1480
- Town status: 1959

Government
  - Town Head: Stepan Kostiukovych

Area
  - Total: 7.5 km^{2} (2.9 sq mi)
- Elevation: 161 m (528 ft)

Population (2022)
  - Total: 7,336
  - Density: 980/km^{2} (2,500/sq mi)
- Time zone: UTC+2 (EET)
  - Summer (DST): UTC+3 (EEST)
- Postal code: 34000
- Area code: +380 3632
- Website: http://rada.gov.ua/

Zarichne (Ukrainian: Зарічне, Russian: Зарéчное, Polish: Pohost Zarzeczny) is a rural settlement in Rivne Oblast (province) in western Ukraine. The town also formerly served as the administrative center of Zarichne Raion (district), housing the district's local administration buildings until the raion's abolition, and is now administered within Varash Raion. Its population is 6,854 as of the 2001 Ukrainian Census. Current population: 6,567 (2025 estimate); 7,336 (2022 estimate).

== History ==
The settlement was first founded on September 27, 1480, as Pohost Zarzeczny (Ukrainian: Погост-Зарічний). In 1946, the settlement was renamed to its current "Zarichne." In 1959, the settlement acquired the status of an urban-type settlement in 1959. On 26 January 2024, a new law entered into force which abolished this status, and Zarichne became a rural settlement.
