= Opytne, Bakhmut Raion, Donetsk Oblast =

Opytne Опитне
- Rural settlement
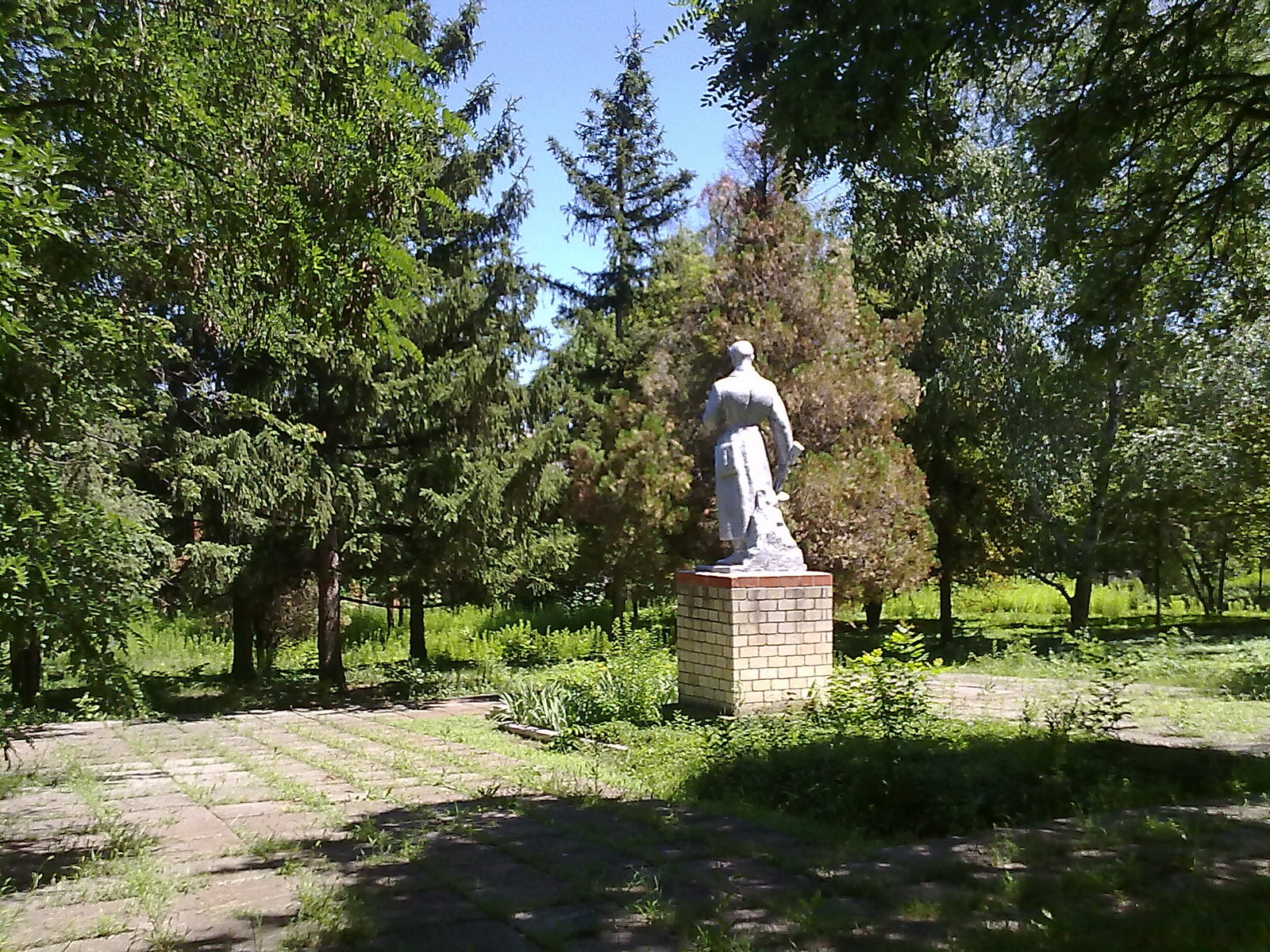

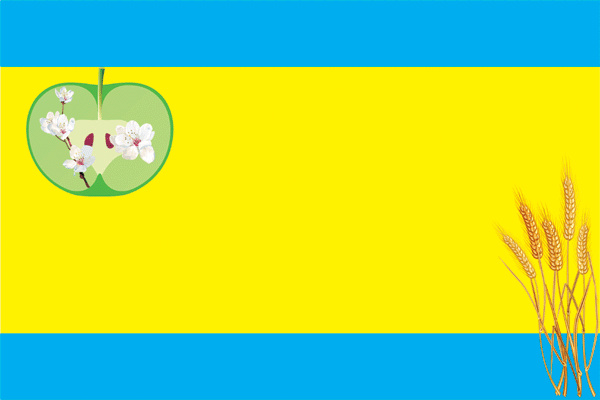
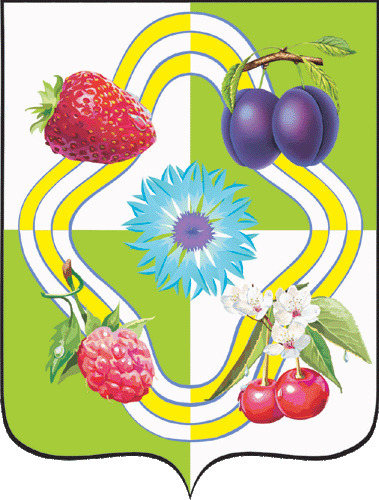
- Flag Coat of arms
- Interactive map of Opytne
- Location of Opytne within Ukraine Opytne (Ukraine)
- Coordinates: 48.554167°N 38.016944°E
- Country: Ukraine
- Oblast: Donetsk Oblast
- Raion: Bakhmut Raion

Area
  - Total: 0.85 km^{2} (0.33 sq mi)
- Elevation: 128 m (420 ft)

Population (01.01.2014)
  - Total: 1,542
  - Density: 1,800/km^{2} (4,700/sq mi)
- Time zone: UTC+2 (EET)
  - Summer (DST): UTC+3 (EEST)
- Postal code: 84571
- Area code: +380 6274

Opytne (Ukrainian: Опитне; Russian: Опытное) is a rural settlement in Bakhmut Raion (district) in Donetsk Oblast of eastern Ukraine, at 64.7 km NNE from the centre of Donetsk city. Since October 2022, it is under the control of the Russian Armed Forces.

Opytne was shelled in 2015 During the War in Donbas (2014–2022) but no casualties were reported.

On 13 October 2022, the Donetsk People's Republic announced that "troops of the DPR and LPR, with support from the Russian Armed Forces, 'liberated' Opytne and Ivanhrad." However, Armed Forces of Ukraine did not confirm this claim. On November 11, 2022, a pro-Russian force claimed Opytne was captured by DPR forces.

== Demographics ==
In 2001, the settlement had 1951 inhabitants.
