= Ivanhrad =

Village in Donetsk Oblast, Ukraine

Ivanhrad Іванград
- Village
- Location of Ivanhrad in Donetsk Oblast Ivanhrad (Ukraine)
- Coordinates: 48.555556°N 38.028611°E
- Country: Ukraine
- Oblast: Donetsk Oblast
- Raion: Bakhmut Raion
- Hromada: Bakhmut urban hromada

Area
  - Total: 1.571 km^{2} (0.607 sq mi)
- Elevation: 167 m (548 ft)

Population (2001 census)
  - Total: 607
  - Density: 386/km^{2} (1,000/sq mi)
- Time zone: UTC+2 (EET)
  - Summer (DST): UTC+3 (EEST)

Ivanhrad (Ukrainian: Іванград; Russian: Иванград, romanized: Ivangrad) is a village in Bakhmut Raion (district) in Donetsk Oblast of eastern Ukraine, at about 65.3 kilometres (40.6 mi) north-northeast (NNE) from the centre of Donetsk city, on the southern border of Bakhmut. It belongs to Bakhmut urban hromada, one of the hromadas of Ukraine.

The village came under attack by Russian forces in 2022, during the Russian invasion of Ukraine. On 11 November 2022, Opytne was captured by DPR and Russian Armed Forces.
