= Zaitseve, Bakhmut urban hromada, Bakhmut Raion, Donetsk Oblast =

Village in Donetsk Oblast, Ukraine

Zaitseve Зайцеве
- Village
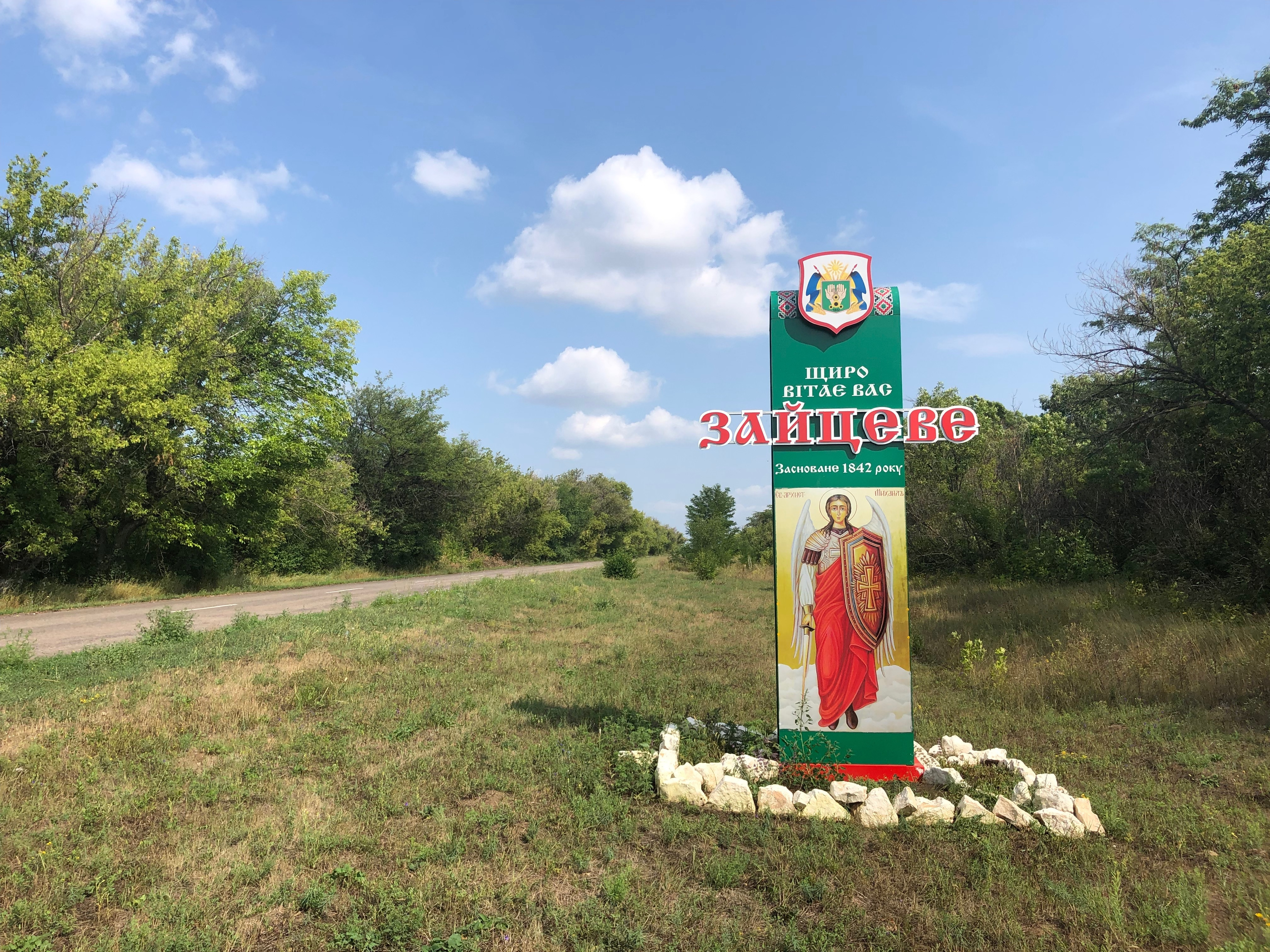

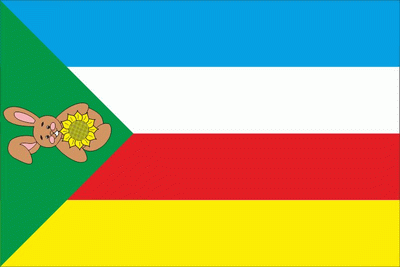
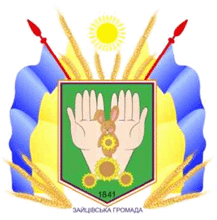
- Flag Coat of arms
- Interactive map of Zaitseve
- Location of Zaitseve in Donetsk Oblast Zaitseve (Ukraine)
- Coordinates: 48°31′36″N 38°04′01″E
- Country: Ukraine
- Oblast: Donetsk Oblast
- Raion: Bakhmut Raion
- Hromada: Bakhmut urban hromada
- Founded: 1842
- Elevation: 191 m (627 ft)

Population (2001 census)
  - Total: 1,160
- Time zone: UTC+2 (EET)
  - Summer (DST): UTC+3 (EEST)
- Postal code: 84570
- Area code: +380 6274
- KATOTTH: UA14020010080032808

Zaitseve (Ukrainian: Зайцеве; Russian: Зайцево) is a village in Bakhmut Raion (district) in Donetsk Oblast of eastern Ukraine, at about 60.3 kilometres (37.5 mi) northeast by north (NEbN) from the centre of Donetsk city, about 4.1 kilometres (2.5 mi) southwards from the southern border of Bakhmut. It belongs to Bakhmut urban hromada, one of the hromadas of Ukraine.

== History ==
=== Russian invasion of Ukraine ===
The settlement came under attack and was captured by Russian forces during the Russian invasion of Ukraine in 2022.

== Demographics ==
As of the 2001 Ukrainian census, the settlement had 1,160 inhabitants, whose native languages were 91.65% Ukrainian and 8.26% Russian.
