= Pokrovske, Bakhmut Raion, Donetsk Oblast =

Pokrovske Покровське
- Village
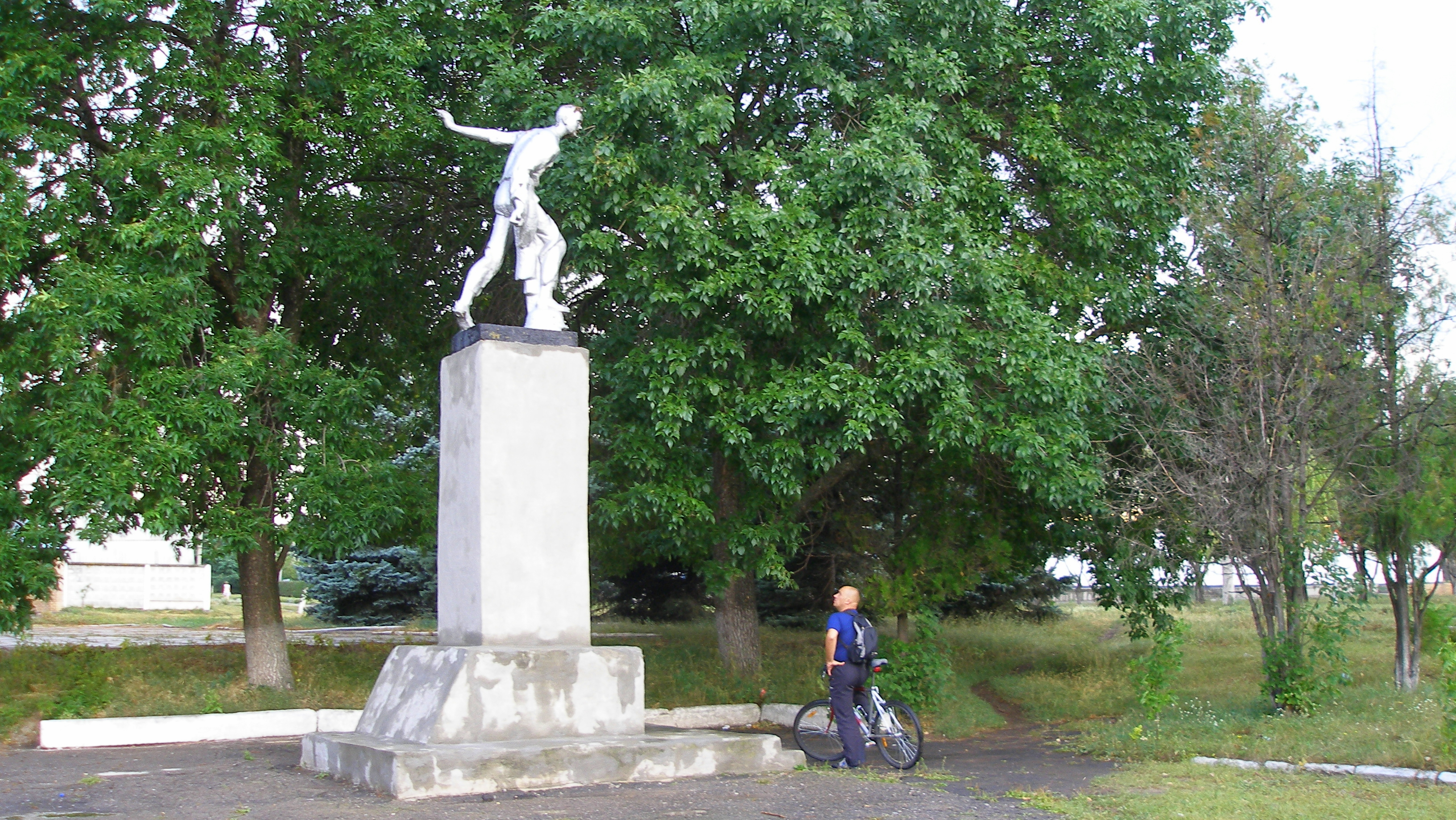
- Interactive map of Pokrovske
- Location of Pokrovske Pokrovske (Ukraine)
- Coordinates: 48°38′05″N 38°07′50″E
- Country: Ukraine
- Oblast: Donetsk Oblast
- Raion: Bakhmut Raion
- Hromada: Bakhmut urban hromada
- Elevation: 99 m (325 ft)

Population (2001)
  - Total: 1,333
- Time zone: UTC+2 (EET)
  - Summer (DST): UTC+3 (EEST)
- Postal code: 84561
- Area code: +380 6274
- Climate: Dfa

Pokrovske (Ukrainian: Покровське; Russian: Покровское) is a village in Bakhmut Raion, Donetsk Oblast, eastern Ukraine.

Pokrovske was reportedly captured by Russian forces on 27 July 2022, during the eastern Ukraine offensive of the 2022 Russian invasion of Ukraine.
