= Klynove, Bakhmut Raion, Donetsk Oblast =

Klynove Клинове
- Village
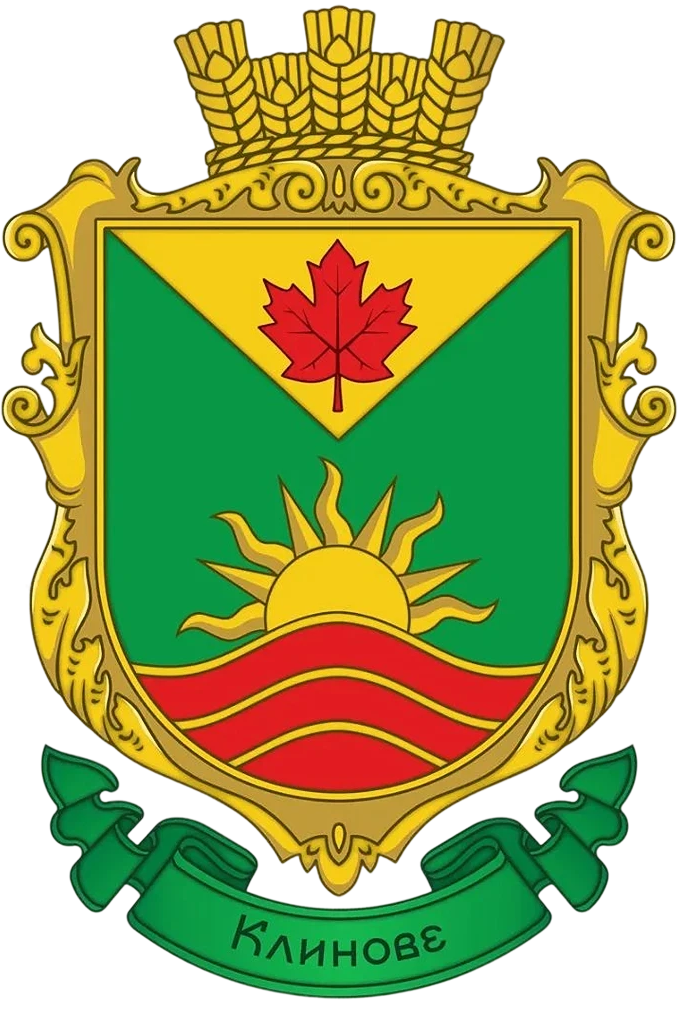
- Coat of arms
- Interactive map of Klynove
- Location of Klynove in Donetsk Oblast Klynove (Donetsk Oblast)
- Coordinates: 48°33′36″N 38°9′52″E
- Country: Ukraine
- Oblast: Donetsk Oblast
- Raion: Bakhmut Raion
- Hromada: Bakhmut urban hromada
- Status: Early 19th century

Population (1886)
  - Total: 555

Klynove (Ukrainian: Клинове) is a village in Bakhmut urban hromada, Bakhmut Raion, Donetsk Oblast, Ukraine.

== History ==
Klynove was founded at the beginning of the 19th century. By 1886, the village, which was located in Bakhmut volost, had a population of 555.

During the Holodomor, a manmade famine in Soviet Ukraine in 1932–1933, the number of recorded victims who died in the village is 120.
