= Vidrodzhennia, Bakhmut Raion, Donetsk Oblast =

Vidrodzhennia Відродження
- Village
- Location within Donetsk Oblast Location within Ukraine
- Coordinates: 48°31′40″N 38°13′16″E
- Country: Ukraine
- Oblast: Donetsk Oblast
- Raion: Bakhmut Raion
- Hromada: Bakhmut urban hromada
- Elevation: 195 m (640 ft)

Population
  - Total: 220
- Postal code: 84562

Vidrodzhennia (Ukrainian: Відродження, lit. 'Revival', 'Renaissance') is a village in Bakhmut urban hromada, Bakhmut Raion, Donetsk Oblast, Ukraine. According to the 2001 Ukrainian census, the population was 278. By 2012, the population had shrunk to 187.

The village was shelled by Russian artillery during the battle of Bakhmut.
