= Vershyna, Donetsk Oblast =

Village in Donetsk oblast, Ukraine

Vershyna Вершина
- Village
- Location within Donetsk Oblast Location within Ukraine
- Coordinates: 48°30′59″N 38°7′43″E
- Country: Ukraine
- Oblast: Donetsk Oblast
- Raion: Bakhmut Raion
- Hromada: Bakhmut urban hromada
- Elevation: 172 m (564 ft)

Population
  - Total: 24
- Postal code: 84570

Vershyna (Ukrainian: Вершина) is a village in Bakhmut urban hromada, Bakhmut Raion, Donetsk Oblast, in eastern Ukraine.

According to the 2001 census, the village has a population of 24.

On 17 August 2022, the Donetsk People's Republic claimed they had taken control of the village, during the Eastern Ukraine campaign of the Russian invasion of Ukraine.
