= Vershina =

Vershina (Russian: Вершина) is the name of several rural localities in Russia:

- Vershina, Kotlassky District, a village in Cheremushsky Selsoviet of Kotlassky District of Arkhangelsk Oblast
- Vershina, Krasnoborsky District, Arkhangelsk Oblast, a village in Belosludsky Selsoviet of Krasnoborsky District of Arkhangelsk Oblast
- Vershina, Belgorod Oblast, a khutor in Prokhorovsky District of Belgorod Oblast
- Vershina, Nizhneudinsky District, a settlement in Nizhneudinsky District, Irkutsk Oblast
- Vershina, Alarsky District, a village in Alarsky District, Irkutsk Oblast
- Vershina, Bokhansky District, a village in Bokhansky District, Irkutsk Oblast
- Vershina, Lipetsk Oblast, a village in Novosilsky Selsoviet of Terbunsky District of Lipetsk Oblast
- Vershina, Moscow Oblast, a village in Dorokhovskoye Rural Settlement of Orekhovo-Zuyevsky District of Moscow Oblast
- Vershina, Sverdlovsk Oblast, a settlement under the administrative jurisdiction of the Town of Ivdel in Sverdlovsk Oblast
- Vershina, Tyumen Oblast, a village in Antipinsky Rural Okrug of Nizhnetavdinsky District of Tyumen Oblast
- Vershina, Kaduysky District, a village in Chuprinsky Selsoviet of Kaduysky District of Vologda Oblast
- Vershina, Vozhegodsky District, a village in Beketovsky Selsoviet of Vozhegodsky District of Vologda Oblast
- Vershina, Voronezh Oblast, a khutor in Aleynikovskoye Rural Settlement of Rossoshansky District of Voronezh Oblast
