= MiG-17 aircraft monument =

MiG-17 aircraft monument may refer to:

- MiG-17 aircraft monument (Bakhmut), Ukraine
- MiG-17 aircraft monument (Malang), Indonesia
- Hargeisa War Memorial, Hargeisa, Somaliland, which consists of a MiG-17 aircraft
