= Battle of Bakhmut =

Battle in the Russo-Ukrainian war in 2022 and 2023

- Part of the eastern front of the Russo-Ukrainian war
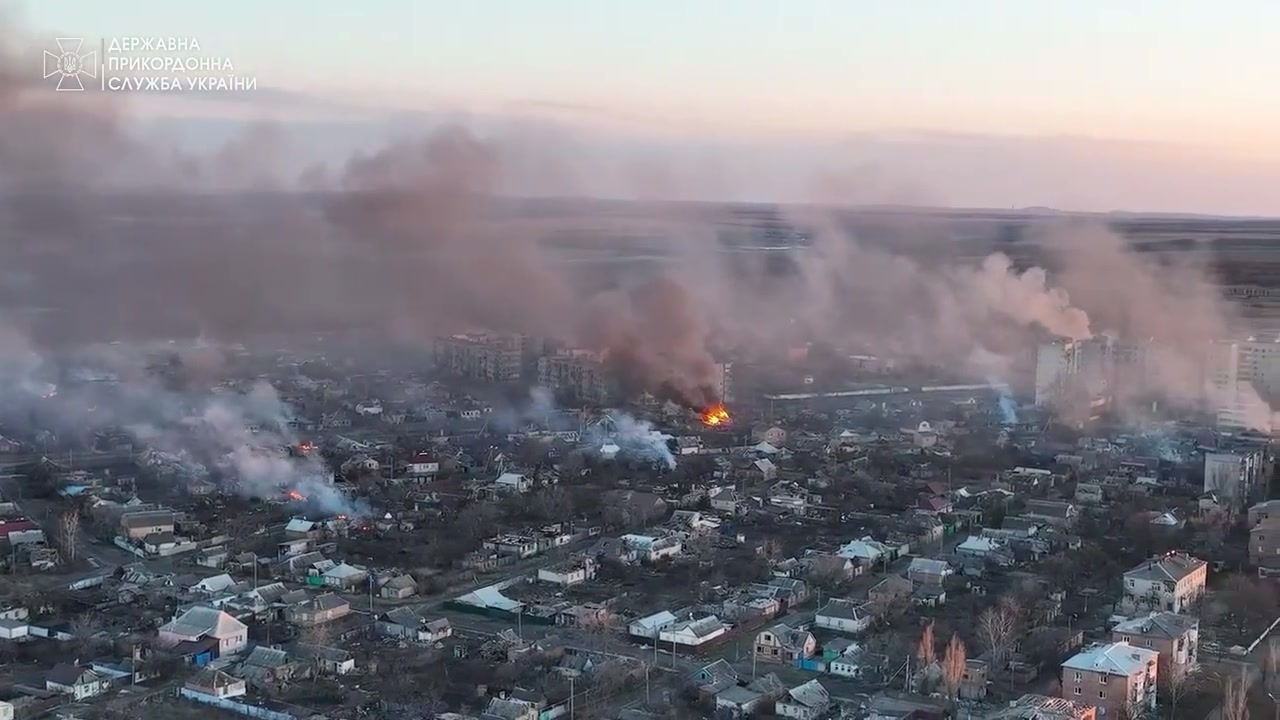
- View of western Bakhmut in April 2023
Date	July 2022 (Note: The start date is not well defined. Attacks on the distant approaches to the city took place in early July 2022. The Mediazona media outlet considers the death of the first recruited prisoner of the Wagner Group in the Bakhmut area on 15 July 2022, the start date of the battle. In contrast, the CIT investigative organization considers the battle started after the Russian capture of the Vuhlehirska Power Station, which was seized on 26 July 2022.) – 20 May 2023 (Note: There is no clear consensus on the end date.)
Location	Bakhmut, Donetsk Oblast, Ukraine 48°35′N 38°0′E
Result	Russian victory – see § Result

Belligerents
Russia: Donetsk People's Republic (Note: Until the Republic's annexation on 30 September 2022)	Ukraine

Commanders and leaders
(Russia) Yevgeny Prigozhin	Oleksandr Syrskyi

Strength
85,000+ Wagner mercenaries	30,000+ soldiers 80,000 soldiers (Prigozhin claim)

Casualties and losses
Estimates vary, see § Military casualties	
- 204 Bakhmut residents killed (4 children), 505 injured (17 children)

The Battle of Bakhmut was a major battle between the Russian Armed Forces and the Ukrainian Armed Forces for control of the city of Bakhmut, during the eastern front, a theatre of the Russo-Ukrainian war. It is regarded by some military analysts to be the bloodiest battle since World War II.

The shelling of Bakhmut began in May 2022, and Russian offensives on the distant approaches to the city began in early July. The main assault towards the city itself started after Russian forces advanced from the direction of Popasna following a Ukrainian withdrawal from that front. The main assault force consisted primarily of mercenaries from the Russian paramilitary organization Wagner Group, supported by regular Russian troops and reportedly Donetsk People's Republic militia elements.

In late 2022, following Ukraine's Kharkiv and Kherson counteroffensives, the Bakhmut–Soledar front became an important focus of the war, being one of the few front lines where Russia remained on the offensive. Attacks on the city intensified in November 2022, as assaulting Russian forces were reinforced by units redeployed from the Kherson front, together with newly mobilized recruits. By this time, much of the front line had descended into positional trench warfare, with both sides suffering high casualties without any significant advances. By using repeated assaults composed of former convicts, Wagner troops were able to gradually gain ground and by February 2023, they captured territory in the north and south of Bakhmut and threatened encirclement. Ukrainian forces began slowly withdrawing deeper into the city and the battle turned into fierce urban warfare. By March 2023, Russian forces captured the eastern half of the city, up to the Bakhmutka river.

By 20 May 2023, Bakhmut had been mostly captured by Russian forces, with the Ukrainian military claiming control of a small strip of the city proper along the T0504 highway. Nonetheless, Ukraine started counterattacks on Russia's flanks, seeking to encircle the city. Around the same time on 25 May, Wagner began withdrawing from the city to be replaced by regular Russian troops, amidst heavy internal squabbles between Wagner leadership and Russian high command. In September 2023, President Zelenskyy said Ukraine would continue to fight to retake Bakhmut.

Although initially a target with lesser tactical importance, Bakhmut became one of the central battles of the Russo-Ukrainian War, with it gaining significant symbolic importance for both sides, as President Zelenskyy declared it to be the "fortress of our morale", and due to the heavy investment of manpower and resources both sides used to control the city. The battle of Bakhmut has been described as a "meat grinder" and a "vortex" for both the Ukrainian and Russian militaries. The intensity of the battle and the high number of casualties suffered by both sides during the fight, alongside the trench and urban warfare, has drawn comparisons to the Battle of Verdun in World War I, as well as to the Battle of Stalingrad in World War II. It has been called the most prominent urban battle of the war, with it being reported as the site of "some of the fiercest urban combat in Europe since World War II".

== Background ==
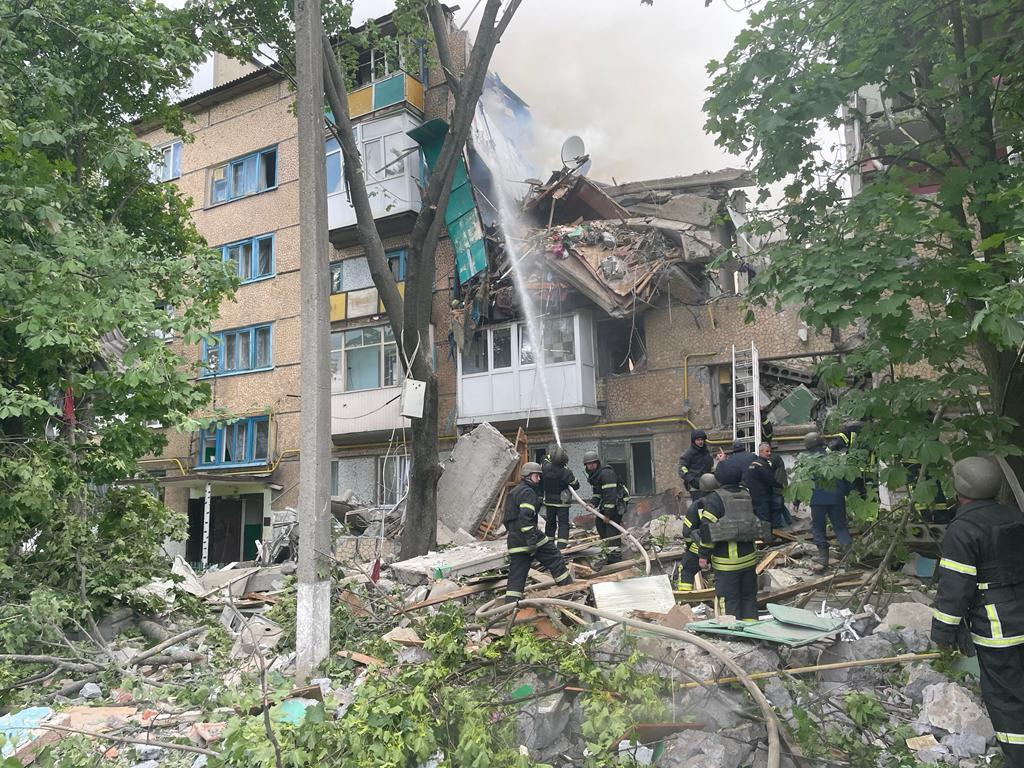
An apartment block in Bakhmut after Russian shelling. Shelling of the city began in May 2022.

Bakhmut, formerly known as Artemivsk, was the site of a 2014 battle between Ukraine and the self-declared separatist Donetsk People's Republic. Pro-Russian separatists had captured parts of the city during the 2014 pro-Russian unrest in Ukraine in April, and a Ukrainian special forces unit together with the National Guard were dispatched to expel the separatists from the city. The separatists were expelled to the city's outskirts where clashes continued until July 2014, when they finally retreated from the area.

During the Russian invasion of Ukraine, a key Russian goal was to capture the Donbas region, consisting of Donetsk and Luhansk oblasts. The initial push for Bakhmut was part of an attempt to encircle the Ukrainian forces at the Sievierodonetsk-Lysychansk salient; together with another push from the Lyman direction, it would create a pocket and trap Ukrainian forces there. Starting on 17 May 2022, Russian forces began shelling Bakhmut, killing five people including a two-year-old child.

After the fall of Popasna, Ukrainian forces retreated from the city to reinforce positions at Bakhmut by 22 May. Meanwhile, Russian forces managed to advance on the Bakhmut-Lysychansk highway, endangering the remaining Ukrainian troops in the Lysychansk-Sievierodonetsk area. The Russian checkpoint along the highway was later demolished, although fighting resumed on 30 May along the Kostiantynivka-Bakhmut highway, where Ukrainian forces successfully defended the highway.

Shelling of Bakhmut continued throughout the rest of June and July. Following the battles of Sievierodonetsk and Lysychansk in early July, Russian and separatist forces captured all of Luhansk oblast, and the battlefield shifted towards the cities of Bakhmut and Soledar. On 25 July, Ukrainian forces withdrew from the Vuhlehirska Power Station, along with the nearby town of Novoluhanske, giving Russian and separatist forces a "small tactical advantage" towards Bakhmut. Two days later on 27 July, Russian shelling of Bakhmut killed three civilians and wounded three more.

Prior to the battle in Bakhmut, Ukrainian Brigadier General Oleksandr Tarnavskyi claimed that Russia held a five-to-one manpower advantage over Ukraine along the eastern front.

== Battle ==
=== Early shelling and Russian encroachment (July–October 2022) ===
On 22 July 2022, Russian forces reportedly captured the southern part of Pokrovske, less than five kilometers east of Bakhmut. Five days later, it was reported that Russian troops had taken full control of the village, as part of setting conditions to advance west on Bakhmut.

On 1 August 2022, Russian forces launched assaults on settlements southeast and northeast of Bakhmut, including Yakovlivka, Soledar, and Vershyna, which the Ukrainian General Staff said it had repelled. Pro-Russian Telegram channels claimed that Russian forces were within two kilometers of the city. The following day, Ukraine reported that Russian forces had increased airstrikes and shelling of Bakhmut, beginning a ground attack on the southeastern part of the city. On 4 August, Wagner Group mercenaries managed to break through Ukrainian defenses and reach Patrice Lumumba street on the eastern outskirts of Bakhmut. In the following days, Russian forces continued to push towards Bakhmut from the south, with the Ukrainian general staff stating on 14 August that Russian forces had achieved "partial success" near Bakhmut, but offering no specifics.

Night shelling in the city center on 21 September burned the Martynov Palace of Culture, where the humanitarian headquarters worked. During the extinguishing of the fire, the local fire department was shelled, which reported that two SES staff were injured and equipment damaged. At night, a five-story building was also partially destroyed by Russian shelling. A Russian missile strike on 22 September destroyed the main bridge across the Bakhmutka river that bisects the city, disrupting both civilian travel and Ukrainian military logistics.

American military correspondent David Axe reported that by 26 September, Russia's 144th Guards Motor Rifle Division, which had a prewar strength of over 12,000 troops, had been largely destroyed and rendered combat ineffective as a result of heavy casualties sustained in the fighting around Bakhmut, and in the concurrent 2022 Kharkiv counteroffensive.

On 7 October, Russian forces advanced into the villages of Zaitseve and Opytne on the southern and southeastern outskirts of Bakhmut, while on 10 October, the UK Defence Ministry claimed that Russian troops advanced closer to Bakhmut. On 12 October, Russian forces claimed to have captured Opytne, located 3 km south of Bakhmut, and Ivanhrad, although these towns were still contested. Fighting within Bakhmut's urban boundaries began some time before 24 October since, by this day, Ukraine did a minor counteroffensive that pushed Russian forces from some factories on the eastern outskirts of the city, along Patrice Lumumba street.

=== Early winter escalation (November–December 2022) ===
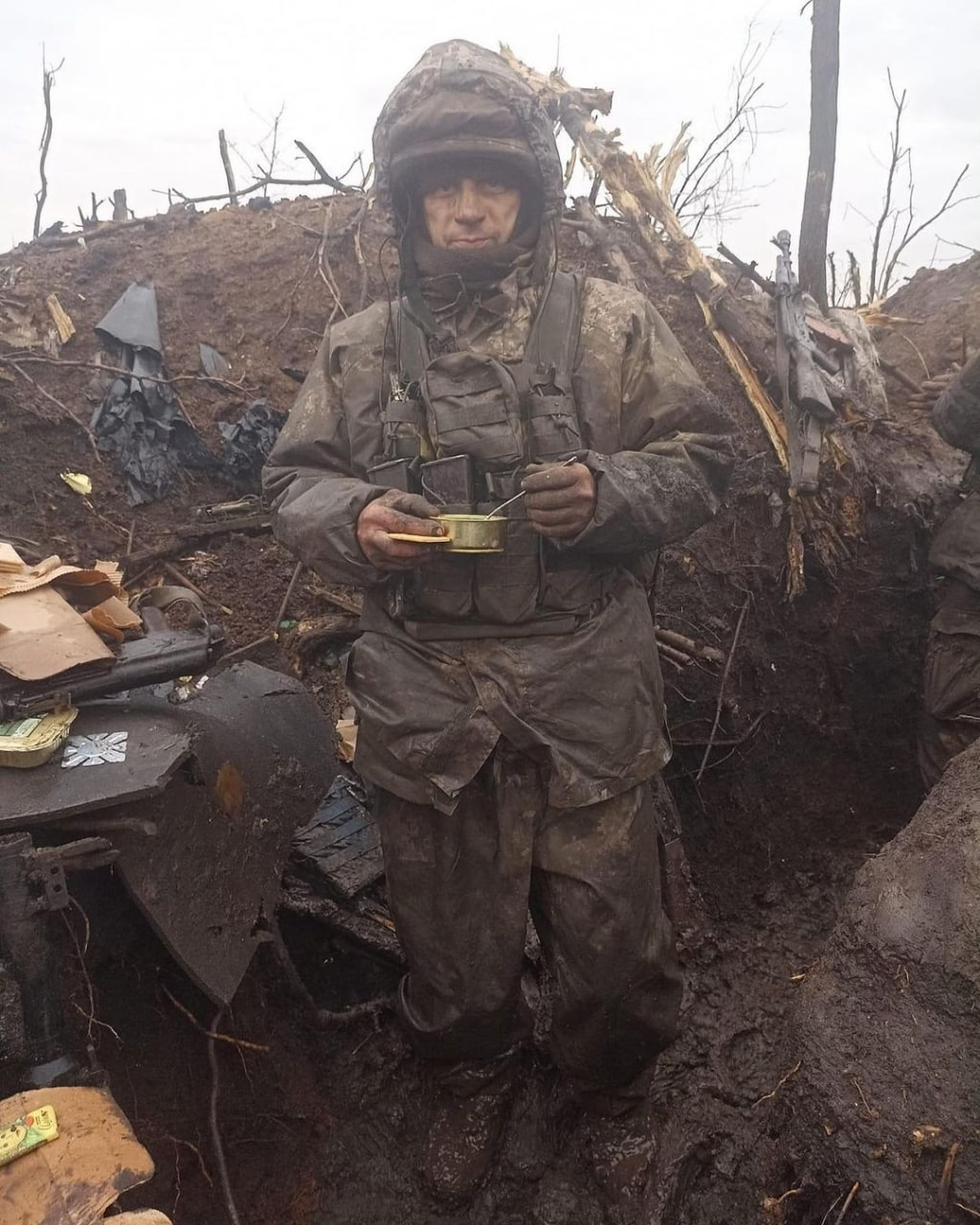
A Ukrainian soldier in a trench near Bakhmut, November 2022

By early November, much of the fighting around Bakhmut had descended into trench warfare conditions, with neither side making any significant breakthroughs and hundreds of casualties reported daily amid fierce shelling and artillery duels. On 1 November, Ukrainian journalist Yurii Butusov described the evolving nature of the battle in an interview. Butusov noted that Russian forces had suffered "huge losses every day" assaulting Bakhmut and its outskirts since early May, but insisted that they were adapting their tactics against increasingly exhausted Ukrainian defenders. He noted that the Russians were concentrating multiple small groups of infantry to break defense lines on "narrow" sections of the front.

Russian milbloggers claimed that Russian forces breached defense lines on Bakhmut's southern approach, allegedly capturing the villages of Andriivka, Ozarianivka, and Zelenopillia and making minor advances in Opytne through 28–29 November. Wagner fighters attacked Kurdyumivka, adjacent to Ozarianivka, with some Russian milbloggers claiming the settlement was captured. Russian forces also attacked Ukrainian positions southeast of Bakhmut. On 3 December, Serhii Cherevatyi, a spokesperson for Ukraine's Eastern Command, described the Bakhmut front as "the most bloody, cruel and brutal sector ... in the Russian-Ukrainian war so far", adding that the Russians had conducted 261 artillery attacks in the past day alone.

The same day, a Georgia military volunteer told the media that a group of Georgian volunteers had been surrounded during clashes near Bakhmut. The commander was wounded and five or six volunteers, serving in Ukraine's 57th Brigade, had been killed, prompting Georgian president Salome Zourabichvili to express condolences. On 6–7 December, the Russian defense ministry claimed that their forces, including Wagner fighters, had successfully repelled Ukrainian counterattacks south of Bakhmut. The commander of the Ukraine National Guard's Svoboda Battalion, defending Bakhmut's southern flank, said they were "fighting for every bush" and predicted Russia would struggle to overcome a canal above and behind Kurdiumivka.

On 9 December, President Volodymyr Zelenskyy accused Russia of "destroying" Bakhmut, calling it "another Donbas city that the Russian army turned into burnt ruins". Former soldier and eyewitness to the battle Petro Stone called the Bakhmut front a "meat grinder", saying the Russians were "covering Bakhmut with fire 24/7". Soldiers of Ukraine's 24th Mechanized Brigade recounted recent battlefield engagements to media, such as one multi-day firefight with 50 Russian troops dug into a treeline where in some places "we were only 100 metres apart". Ukrainian soldiers claimed that front line Russian troops often attacked with little tank support, with Wagner PMC fighters serving as the main assault troops and under-equipped mobiks (recently mobilized Russian recruits) holding defensive positions. One Ukrainian artillerymen alleged that "80 percent" of the remaining civilian population, surviving in basements and supplied by mobile grocery trucks that periodically enter the city, was pro-Russian.

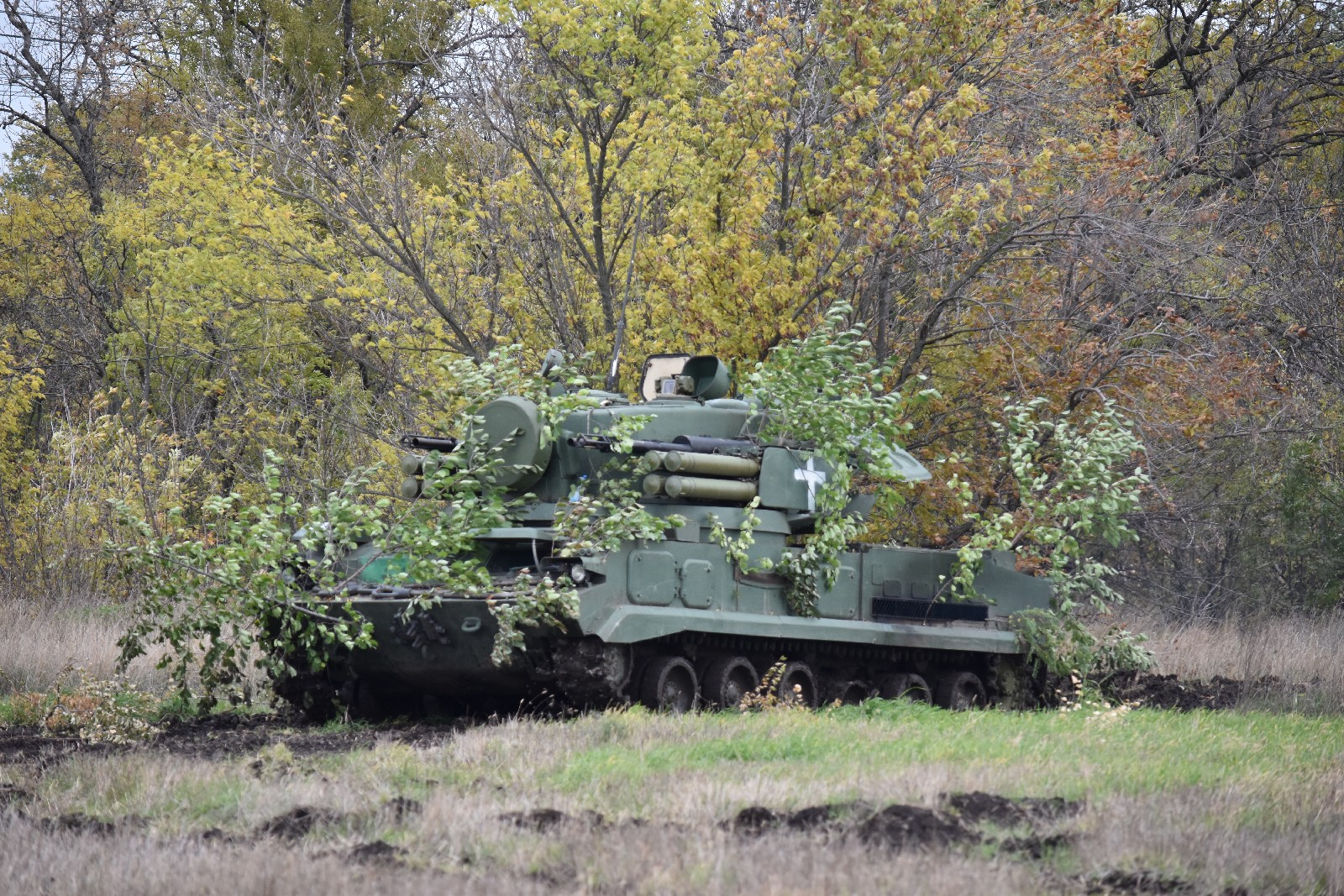
A 9K22 Tunguska of Ukraine's 30th Mechanized Brigade Anti-Air Battalion in the vicinity of Bakhmut

On 11 December a railway bridge over the E40 (M-03) highway north of Bakhmut was destroyed; the Russians accused the Ukrainians of demolishing it to hamper future Russian advances towards Sloviansk.

On 13 December, Russian sources claimed that proper urban street fighting had begun in the eastern and southeastern sectors of Bakhmut, particularly along Pershotravnevyy avenue up to Dobroliubova street in Zabakhmutka, while also claiming that 90% of Opytne had been captured amid fierce Ukrainian resistance. The Ukrainian General Staff said they successfully repelled assaults northeast and south of Bakhmut from the Soledar and Kurdiumivka directions, respectively. On 17 December, footage emerged online of trenches in Bakhmut's city center, indicating Ukrainian defenders were preparing for urban combat.

On 18–19 December, Ukrainian forces, purportedly including dismounted infantry supported by British-donated Wolfhound Tactical Supply Vehicles, counterattacked along Fyodor Maksimenko Street and pushed Wagner forces back to the eastern outskirts of the suburban area amid "grinding" street clashes. Meanwhile, Ukraine's Joint Forces Task Force reported repelling "five to seven" Russian infiltration groups near Bakhmut daily. A Ukrainian commander reported that an abundance of drone surveillance allowed for quick responses to small Russian assaults on the outskirts, while also alleging that Russia did not control Bakhmut's eastern industrial zone. The Institute for the Study of War (ISW), a Western think tank and war observer, could not independently verify the claim of Ukraine entirely controlling the outskirts at the time.

On 20–21 December, President Zelenskyy made an unannounced visit to the Bakhmut front, where he met with soldiers, awarded medals and delivered speeches. Meanwhile, heavy shelling and fighting on Bakhmut's outskirts continued as Russian forces continuously attempted to break entrenched Ukrainian positions on the city's flanks. Reportedly, Wagner fighters were assaulting strongholds in Bakhmutske, Pidhorodne, and Klishchiivka, located along Bakhmut's northeastern and southwestern flanks respectively, while the Ukrainians continued to hold northern Opytne, blunting Russia's advance from the south.

On 26 December, Ukraine's governor of Donetsk, Pavlo Kyrylenko, said over 60 percent of Bakhmut's infrastructure was damaged or destroyed. The ISW judged that Russia's advance on Bakhmut had "culminated" by 28 December, assessing that Russian and Wagner forces had grown increasingly unable to sustain the previous scale of infantry assaults and artillery barrages. By early January 2023, the pace of fighting and rate of artillery fire in the Bakhmut sector had significantly decreased, and The Kyiv Independent remarked that the battle was "near culmination".

=== Capture of Soledar and partial encirclement (January–April 2023) ===
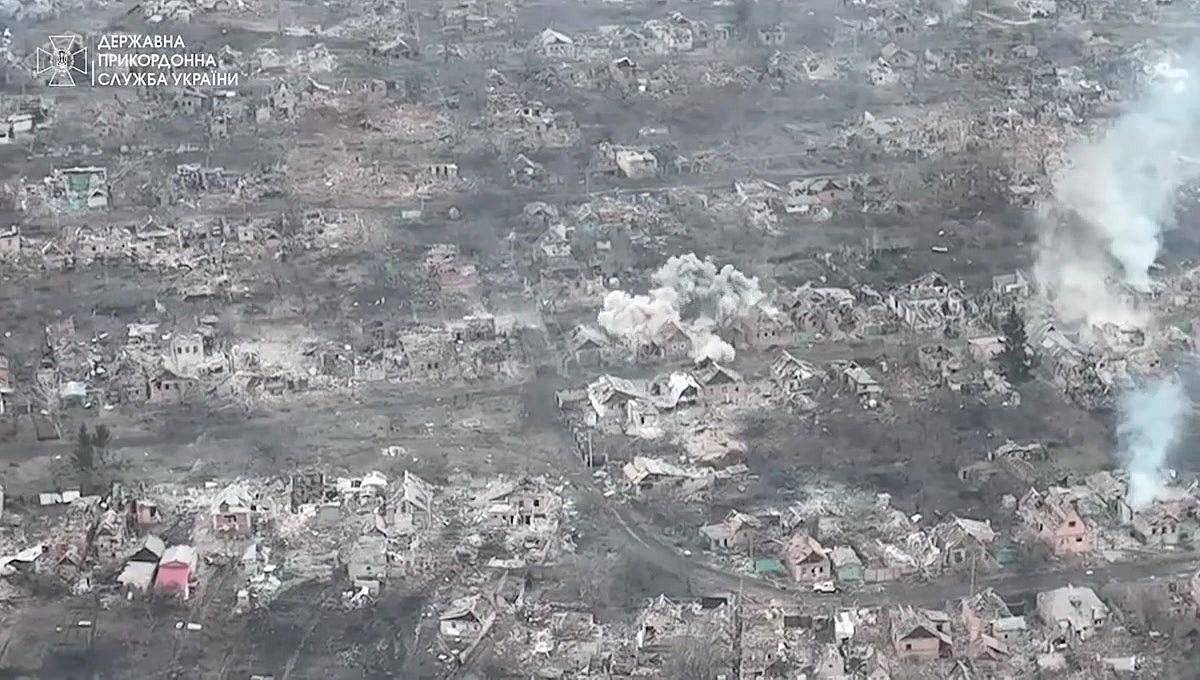
Ruined residential area in Bakhmut, March 2023

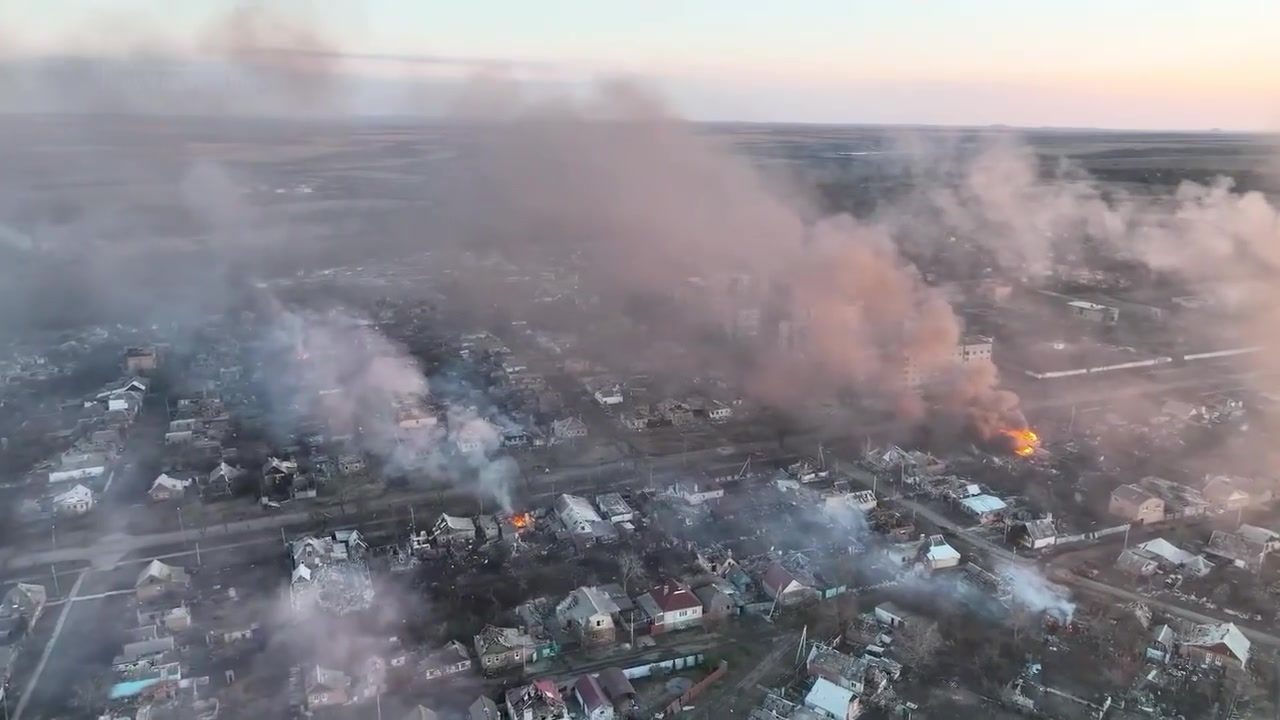
View of western Bakhmut, April 2023

Following a local offensive in early January 2023, Russian forces captured the nearby town of Soledar, located 20 kilometres (12 mi) north of Bakhmut, by 16 January 2023. In its 7 January assessment, the ISW considered the capture of Soledar as helping Russian forces to advance on Bakhmut from the north, although they claimed that Russian troops would need to cut off the T0513 highway between Siversk and Bakhmut to strangle Ukrainian supply lines to Bakhmut.

In February, Russian forces solidified gains north of Bakhmut and began pressuring Ukrainian troops on the northern axis, making incremental gains in the towns north of the city. On 1 February, The New York Times reported that the Russians had increased the intensity of attacks on Bakhmut and its surrounding areas. Days later on 5 February, the British Ministry of Defence stated that Russian troops were able to fire upon the M03 and H32 roads north of the city, the main Ukrainian supply route for northern Bakhmut. On 11 February, Russian forces captured the village of Krasna Hora northeast of Bakhmut. Around this time, analysts suggested Russian losses had increased to 820 casualties a day between Bakhmut and the battle of Vuhledar. By 13 February, the Ukrainian government claimed their defenses in the village of Paraskoviivka were waning, with fierce battles around the clock. By 22 February, Russian forces partially encircled Bakhmut from the east, south, and north.

By 3 March, Ukrainian soldiers had destroyed two key bridges, creating the possibility for a controlled fighting withdrawal. On 4 March, Bakhmut's deputy mayor told news services that there was street fighting but that Russian forces had not taken control of the city. The same day, the chief of the Wagner Group, Yevgeny Prigozhin, said that the city was encircled except for one road still controlled by the Ukrainian military, as had been the case since 22 February. On 5 March Ukrainian commander Oleksandr Syrskyi said the fighting had reached the "highest level of tension".

On 7 March, Ukraine withdrew from areas of Bakhmut east of the Bakhmutka river, making the river the front line between the opposing forces. On 9 March, the MiG-17 monument, which had become a symbol of Ukrainian resistance in Bakhmut during the battle, was destroyed by Russian forces. On 11 March, the United Kingdom's Ministry of Defence said that by this point in the fighting Wagner Group units were "taking the lead in fighting", and that the river had become a "killing zone" for Wagner units while at the same time Ukrainian forces were at risk of being cut off. On 22 March, the UK defence ministry observed that "There is a realistic possibility that the Russian assault on the town (Bakhmut) is losing the limited momentum it had achieved, in part because some Russian Ministry of Defense units have been redeployed to other sectors."

On 26 March, Wagner forces captured the strategically significant Azom factory in the city. On 6 April, Russian forces took control of the city center.

On 14 April, the British defence ministry observed that Russia had "re-energised its assault on the Donetsk Oblast town of Bakhmut as forces of the Russian MoD and Wagner Group have improved co-operation ... Ukrainian forces face significant resupply issues but have made orderly withdrawals from the positions they have been forced to concede."

On 17 April, the People's House of the city was destroyed by retreating Ukrainian soldiers belonging to the 77th Airmobile Brigade to prevent the building from being used as a refuge by Russian forces. On 18 April, Ukrainian General Oleksandr Syrskyi reported that Russia was "increasing the activity of heavy artillery and the number of air strikes, turning the city into ruins".

On 26 April, the Ukrainian Air Force dropped four 500-pound GBU-62/B JDAM glide bombs on a high-rise building in the Russian-controlled part of Bakhmut, possibly from two MiG-29s. Both Ukrainian and Russian forces were destroying high-rise buildings in Bakhmut to prevent them from being used "as ammo dumps, fighting positions and observation posts."

The Institute for the Study of War assessed that by the beginning of May 2023, Ukraine only controlled 1.89 square kilometers (4.54%) of the city.

=== Ukrainian flanking counterattacks begin (May 2023) ===
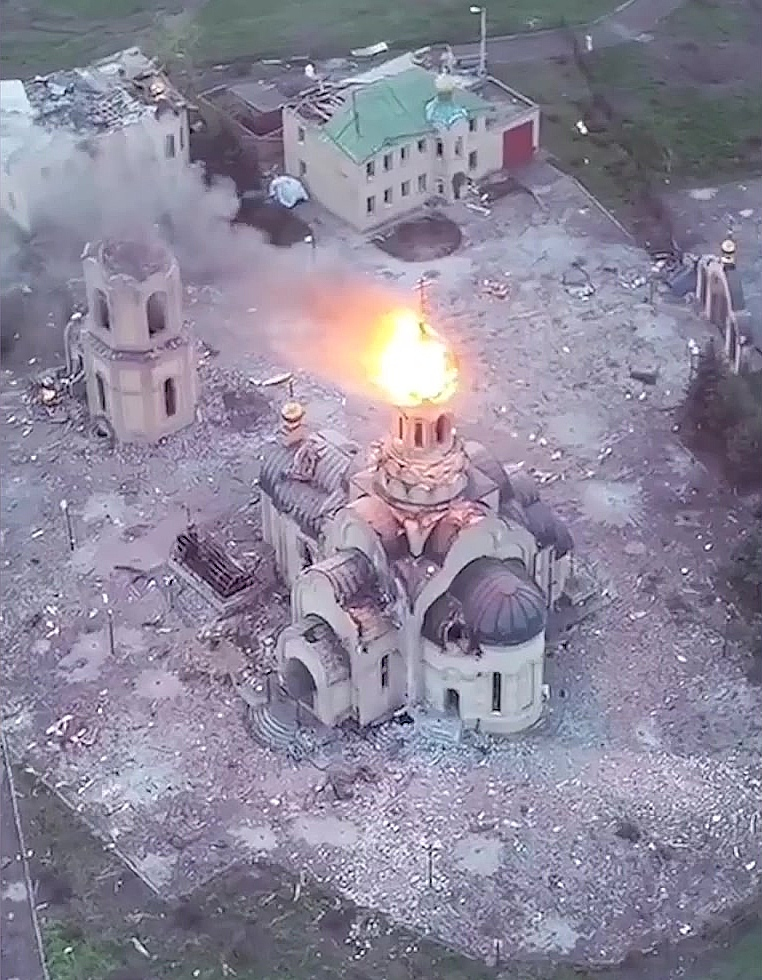
The Orthodox Annunciation church building in west Bakhmut was reportedly destroyed by 8 May 2023.

In May 2023, Russian forces claimed to have captured Bakhmut city proper, while Ukrainian forces insisted clashes continued within the city as they conducted counterattacks on the outskirts. Meanwhile, as Russian attacks culminated, Wagner Group leader Yevgeny Prigozhin sharply increased his public criticism of the Russian Ministry of Defence's management of the battle.

On 1 May, Ukrainian spokesman Serhiy Cherevaty gave an estimate of the current strength of Russian forces attacking the city. He stated that "on the Bakhmut direction, 25,600 personnel, 65 tanks, 450 armored fighting vehicles, 154 guns, 56 rocket salvo systems are fighting against us".

On 2 May, Yevgeny Prigozhin complained that there was a shortage of ammunition, with his forces needing 300 tonnes a day. Within a few days, Prigozhin threatened that he would withdraw all Wagner personnel from the city by 10 May, the day after Victory Day. He further denounced Sergei Shoigu and Valery Gerasimov, saying: "in the absence of ammunition [Wagner personnel are] doomed to perish senselessly." Chechen leader Ramzan Kadyrov agreed to replace Wagner forces with Chechen units in the city, according to Prigozhin.

On 6 May, Ukrainian military sources reported that the Russians were shelling the city with phosphorus munitions, with several videos and photos being released that showed the effects of the bombardment. The BBC, analyzing the footage, said that while the footage definitely showed Russian forces using some sort of incendiary munitions, it was unable to verify that it was phosphorus specifically.

On 7 May, Prigozhin announced that Gerasimov would resume artillery ammunition distribution to Wagner forces, that Wagner forces would remain in Bakhmut, and that Sergey Surovikin would be acting as an intermediary between Wagner and the Russian Ministry of Defence. The ISW assessed that Gerasimov likely agreed to keep Kadyrov out of the Russian High Command and that the situation showcased that the Russian Ministry of Defense was having difficulty commanding Wagner forces. Colonel General Oleksandr Syrskyi, Ukrainian Commander of Ground Forces, said that Prigozhin's claims of ammunition shortages were false, saying that the Russians were "pummeling" their positions.

On 9–10 May, Ukrainian forces launched counterattacks on Bakhmut's outskirts, expelling Russian troops from the southern bank of the Berkhivka Reservoir, located about 4 kilometers northwest of Bakhmut. General Syrskyi claimed that the Russians had been forced back over 2 km (1.2 miles) in the attack, with spokesman Serhiy Cherevaty further claiming that 11 IFVs, two armored personnel carriers, a light artillery tractor, five field ammunition depots, and one Zala UAV were destroyed. The Ukrainians said their 3rd Separate Assault Brigade had cleared an area 1,730 metres wide and 700 metres deep, routing units of Russia's 72nd Separate Motorized Rifle Brigade and killing 23 soldiers and wounding over 40. One tank and four AFVs were also destroyed, with Ukrainian Border Guards also repelling Russian advances from within the city itself, destroying an 11-man assault group. The 72nd Brigade had "escaped" from the city and the remaining troops had suffered very high casualties, with the 3rd Assault Brigade claiming to have completely destroyed the 72nd's 6th and 8th Companies, and agreed with Prigozhin's claim that "500 Russian corpses" were left on the battlefield. The brigade's 3rd Separate Assault Battalion alone was reportedly responsible for 64 Russians killed, while information on another 87 "eliminated" was being "clarified" at the time. They also claimed to have taken five prisoners.

Prigozhin accused the regular Russian forces of "[running] away" from their positions in response to the counterattacks, while Wagner forces were allegedly forbidden from retreating under threat of "high treason" charges. He claimed Russia's defence ministry was more focused on internal power struggles and "intrigues" than actually fighting, and also accused the ministry of only providing his troops 10% of what was promised, resulting in high Wagner casualties. He again threatened that if he did not receive ammunition, Wagner would withdraw from their positions.

On 15 May, General Syrskyi stated the recent counterattacks were "the first success of offensive actions in the defence of Bakhmut." On 16 May, the Ukrainian defence ministry claimed that their forces had liberated 20 square kilometers in the north and south of the suburbs of Bakhmut, while also admitting that Russian forces were still advancing in the city itself, by using both paratroopers and artillery.

On 18 May, Prigozhin said that regular Russian forces had withdrawn up to 570 meters (1,880 feet) to the north of the city, exposing Wagner's flanks, while his soldiers had advanced up to 400 meters inside the city. On 19 May, Ukrainian sources claimed Ukrainian troops had advanced a mile in some areas, or "150 to 1,700 metres". A Ukrainian commander, Petro Podaru, said that Russian artillery fire had transitioned towards preventing Ukrainian forces from "deliver(ing) more infantry, ammunition and other things" via access roads west of Bakhmut. On the same day, the Ukrainians claimed the Russians had recently deployed several thousand more troops to the Bakhmut front.

=== Capture of Bakhmut and Wagner withdrawal (20 May – early June 2023) ===
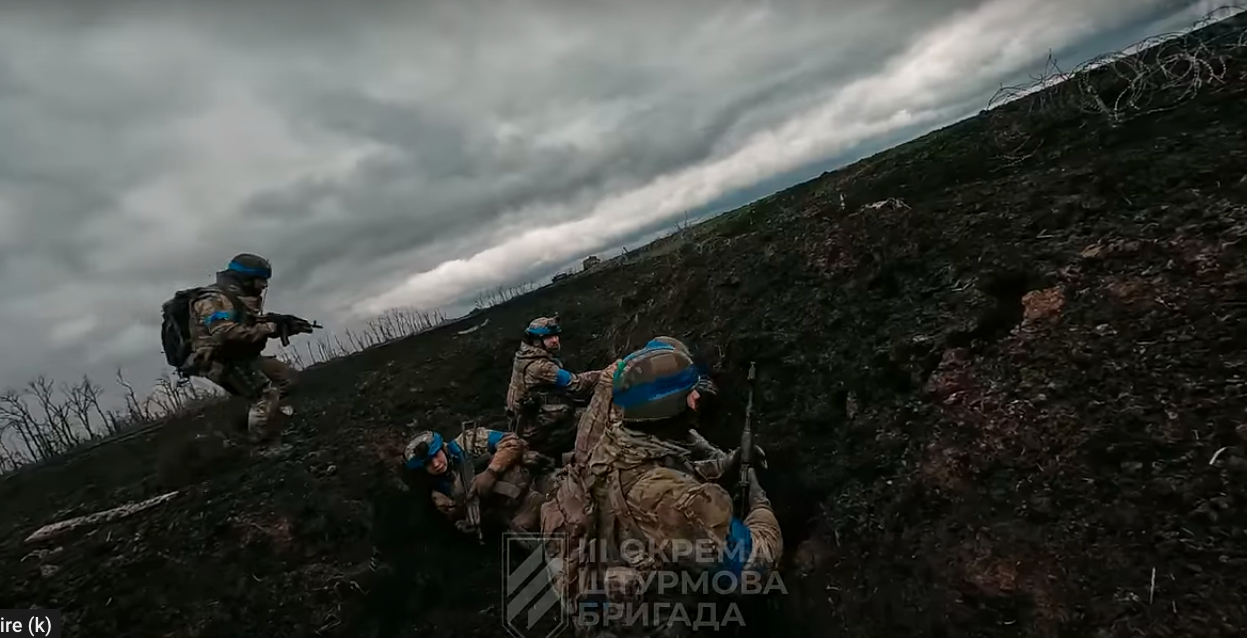
Ukrainian 3rd Assault Brigade soldiers raiding a trench, May 2023

On 20 May, Prigozhin proclaimed the capture of Bakhmut by Wagner forces, who were set to transfer their captured positions to regular Russian forces before withdrawing. The Russian defence ministry also subsequently stated that the city had been captured. The Ukrainians denied that the city was fully captured, with Ukrainian deputy minister of defence Hanna Maliar saying the situation was "critical" but insisted Ukrainian troops still controlled areas of the city, notably the private sector in the 'Litak' ('Samolet' in Russian) area. The ISW was unable to immediately confirm Prigozhin's statement and reiterated Ukrainian reports that fighting continued, particularly citing that the 3rd Separate Assault Brigade had recaptured a region 1,750 meters wide and 700 meters deep in the suburbs.

On 21 May, the Ukrainian defence ministry claimed that its forces had "taken the city in a semi-encirclement". On the other hand, officials described their holdout around the T0504 highway as "insignificant". Based on this, the ISW assessed that Ukrainian forces had indeed withdrawn from the city, except for some fortified areas adjacent to the two highways on the city's western approach. Prigozhin again insisted the entirety of Bakhmut had been captured "right up to the last centimetre" and added that Wagner made no advances on 21 May as they were preparing to withdraw later in the week. Geolocated footage published on 21 May showed that Wagner forces had advanced towards the T0504 entrance to southwestern Bakhmut. Clashes were reportedly taking place as of 22 May in localities neighboring Bakhmut. On 23 May, the Ukrainian General Staff did not declare fighting in Bakhmut for the first time since December 2022. Ukrainian officials insisted that Ukraine held positions near the former MiG-17 monument in southwestern Bakhmut in spite of footage purportedly showing Wagner forces near the monument. Fighting in the localities outside of Bakhmut's city limits continued.

On 25 May, Prigozhin promised to withdraw all Wagner forces from Bakhmut to transfer full control to Russian units by 1 June. The ISW assessed that the units supplanting Wagner forces within the city were from the Donetsk People's Republic militia. In their 26 May report, the ISW cited Russian milbloggers as reporting on successful Ukrainian counterattacks near Orikhovo-Vasylivka and Klischiivka, northwest and southwest of Bakhmut respectively.

In their 27 May report, the ISW noted a substantial decrease in Russian offensive activities in and around Bakhmut. Hanna Maliar attributed this to Russian forces performing relief in place operations to cover Wagner withdrawals. They also noted failed Russian attacks against the suburbs of Khromove and Predtechyne and that there was no change to the status of the reported Ukrainian-controlled strip in the city's southwestern outskirts. The ISW further assessed that the 31st Guards Air Assault Brigade had recently been sent to Bakhmut to cover Russian flanks. The British Ministry of Defence and the ISW both assessed that the unit supplanting Wagner was the 132nd Separate Guard Motorized Rifle Brigade of the DNR's 1st Army Corps, reflecting Russia's attempts to have the city be incorporated into the DPR. The ISW also speculated that Russia would redirect their forces from Bakhmut to the Avdiivka-Donetsk front.

Prigozhin said on 28 May that regular Russian forces were performing relief operations, and that the full withdrawal of Wagner forces would not take place until 5 June. The rate of Russian assaults remained low, with only two reported attacks against the suburbs of Orikhovo-Vasylivka and Ivanivske, both of which were unsuccessful. Ukrainian Colonel Serhiy Cherevaty reported one instance of fighting near Bakhmut and published geolocated footage that indicated that Russian forces had made marginal gains west of Klishchiivka.

On 29 May, the ISW reported only one unsuccessful attack against Orikhovo-Vasylivka and stated that Russia's 106th Guards Airborne Division had been sent to reinforce the northern flank. Both armies were less active in offensive operations in the Bakhmut direction on 30 May. The ISW reported more unsuccessful Russian attacks against Orikhovo-Vasylivka, Bila Hora, Khromove, Ivanivske and Klishchiivka on 31 May. It also noted that the DPR's 1st "Wolves" Sabotage and Reconnaissance Brigade were active in Zaliznianske. They further assessed that Russia was cycling the DPR irregulars out of the Avdiivka-Donetsk front to be replaced by regular Russian forces in Bakhmut which, in turn, were to be sent to Avdiivka. Maliar claimed that Ukrainian forces maintained control over the southwestern outskirts and entrance to Bakhmut city.

By 1 June, only 90 Wagner personnel remained within the city. Meanwhile, Russian attacks against Orikhovo-Vasylivka and Bila Hora remained unsuccessful. Ukrainian Colonel Serhiy Cherevaty claimed that Russian units did not participate in Wagner's attrition style of warfare, and instead were using defensive tactics.

On 2 June, Prigozhin accused Russian forces of attempting to attack Wagner forces using anti-tank mines, adding that there were no injuries. On 3 June, the ISW and the British defence ministry stated that under-strength Russian Airborne Forces, including those of the 76th Guards Air Assault Division, 106th Guards Airborne Division, and two other unspecified brigades had deployed to the Bakhmut area. The next day, Prigozhin claimed that Ukrainian forces may have recaptured areas in the southwestern outskirts of the city, supporting the repeated Ukrainian reports of control there since 20 May.

== Military strength and tactics ==
Ukrainian border guard uses a reconnaissance drone to spot Wagner Group fighters and strike their position with artillery, March 2023

There are few reports of the military units and strengths employed by either Russia or Ukraine during the battle. However, Russian assault forces were primarily spearheaded by Wagner Group private military contractors, ex-convicts, reinforcements from other front lines in Ukraine, and recently mobilized recruits. Then-Wagner Group leader Yevgeny Prigozhin reported that Wagner had employed 35,000 regular mercenary fighters. This had been supplemented by 50,000 mercenaries recruited from Russian prisons.

Wagner Group forces enjoyed advantages such as having its flanks covered by regular Russian airborne units, Wagner's own alleged use of Russian convicts as expendable infantry for attacks, and a 5:1 advantage in artillery firepower. Wagner's forces reportedly consisted of a majority of recruited, under-trained ex-convicts and a minority of well-trained contractors serving as group commanders that operated efficiently and encrypted radio communications. Some observers likened Russian tactics to Soviet-style human wave attacks, with Russian troops repeatedly assaulting Ukrainian positions with waves of infantry. Some Ukrainian soldiers alleged that Wagner used its recruited ex-convicts as first wave "human bait" to reveal Ukrainian positions, with those refusing to advance being threatened with execution by firing squads or barrier troops. In late January 2023, Russia began supplanting some Wagner units with better-trained National Guard of Russia (Rosgvardia) and paratroopers, enabling them to make further advances on the front line. During the battle, Russian forces also targeted Bakhmut with Iranian-made drones after 450 of them were reportedly delivered to Russia in mid-October 2022.

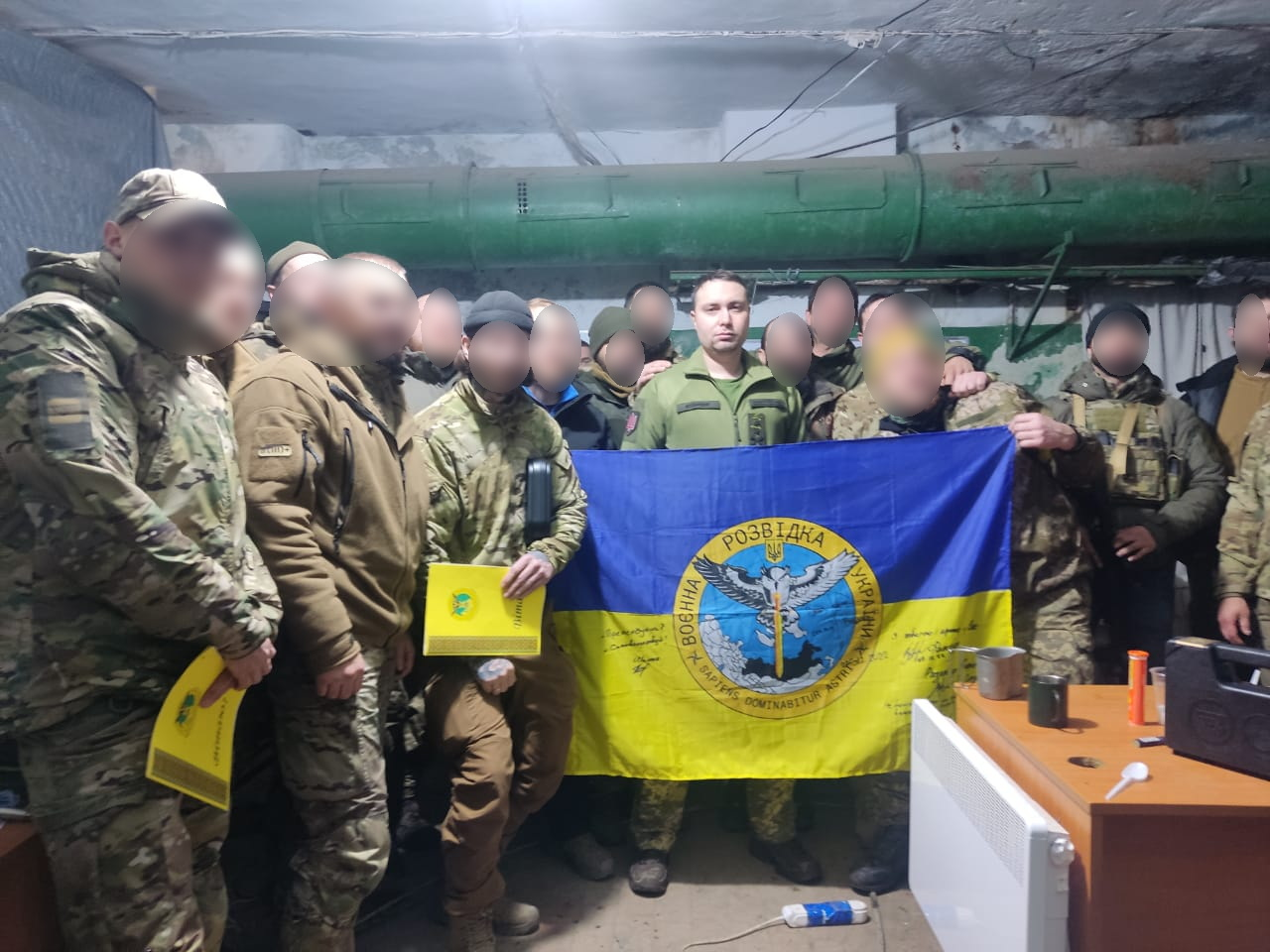
Ukrainian intelligence chief Kyrylo Budanov visiting troops in Bakhmut, December 2022

Ukrainian forces reportedly consisted of a "hodgepodge of units", consisting initially of the 93rd Mechanized Brigade and the 58th Motorized Brigade, who were later reinforced by many other units, including special forces and territorial defense units. The Ukrainians also constantly rotated their units. Military analyst Michael Kofman characterized the Ukrainian strategy as "not one inch back", choosing to hold onto Bakhmut instead of falling back to the more defensible terrain west of the city. Ukrainian commanders expended significant resources in Bakhmut, with their strategy being to keep Russia preoccupied with Bakhmut in order to prevent further offensives elsewhere on the front lines. Conversely, Kofman argued that Ukraine's usage of well-trained National Guard and infantry units against poorly trained Wagner forces was tying down Ukraine's well-trained units and preventing them from conducting offensives of their own. On 10 January 2023, Polish think tank Rochan Consulting estimated Ukraine may have had ten brigades fighting in Bakhmut at the time, or around 30,000 personnel. Prigozhin claimed on 17 April that 80,000 Ukrainian troops were defending Bakhmut.

On 2 June 2023, Prigozhin reported that Wagner forces had been almost totally withdrawn from the battle. At the end of June, the Ukrainian military assessed the strength of Russian forces to be 50,300 soldiers, 330 tanks and 140 artillery systems, and reported that no Wagner personnel remained.

== Aftermath ==
On 4 June 2023, the Ukrainian summer counteroffensive began and the Bakhmut sector was one of its three main axes. However, only small amounts of territory were recaptured, most notably Andriivka on 15 September and Klishchiivka around 17 September. By 29 November 2023, after the counteroffensive had stalled, Russian forces had regained the initiative and captured Khromove on the western outskirts of Bakhmut. They had also recaptured considerable portions of territory south of the Berkhivka Reservoir that they previously lost in May. Bakhmut was the largest Ukrainian city to switch hands in 2023 and the battle greatly contributed to Russia's net gain of territory during the year.

=== Strategic value ===
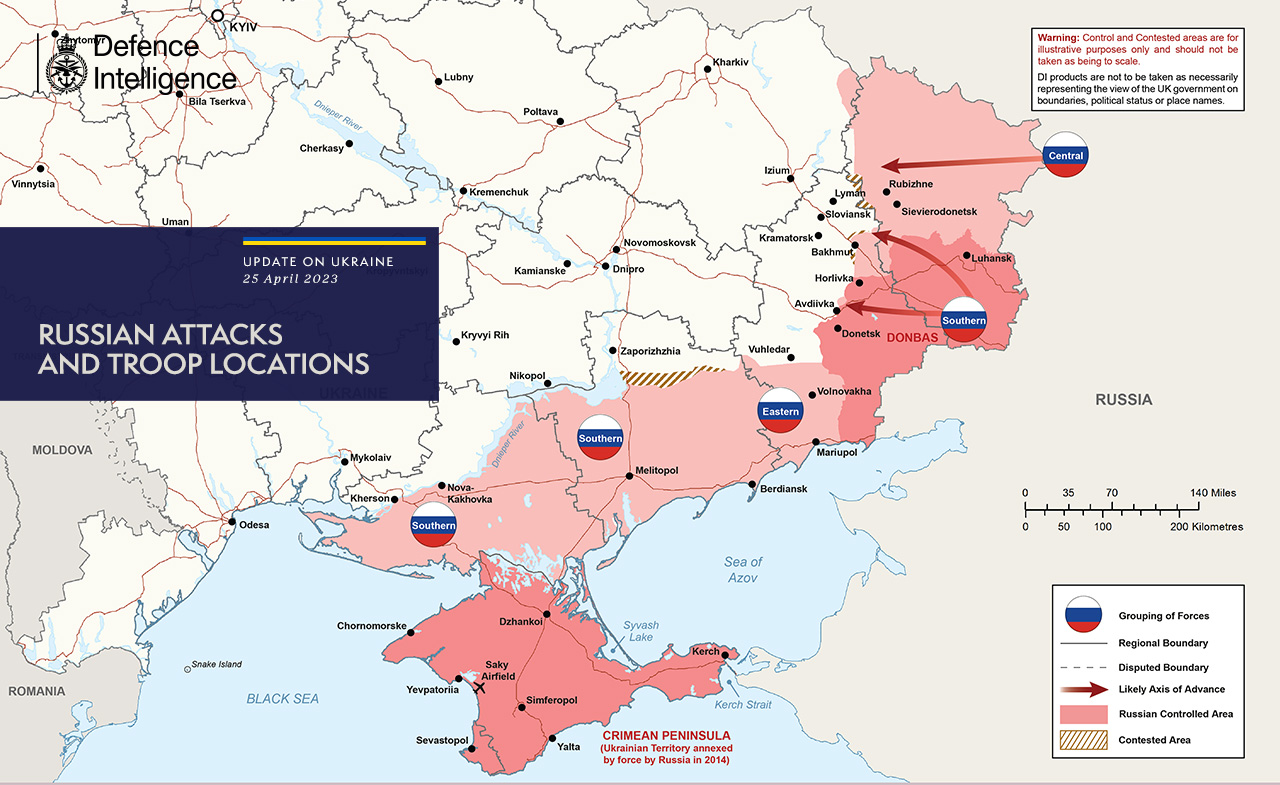
Military situation in Ukraine as of 25 April 2023

The overall strategic value of Bakhmut was considered dubious by many analysts, observing that the resources and lives Russia spent assaulting the city far outweighed its importance. The British defence ministry and US National Security Council both insisted capturing Bakhmut would only be a "symbolic" victory for Russia rather than a strategic one. Konrad Muzyka and expert on Russian security Mark Galeotti argued that Russia's costly assault was a matter of both preserving prestige and sunk cost fallacy—that Russian forces had already expended so much manpower in the war effort on other fronts that they "may as well do everything they can" to seize the city instead of abandoning the effort. George Barros from the Institute for the Study of War characterized Russia's costly capture of Bakhmut as "a tactical victory" but "operational failure—contributing to the continued Russian strategic failure".

However, other observers and sources noted that Bakhmut is a key regional logistics and transport hub where two roads, the T0504 to Kostiantynivka and T0513 to Siversk, pass through. Ukrainian president Volodymyr Zelenskyy attributed both tactical and symbolic value to Bakhmut, calling it a "fortress of our morale" and refusing to order a tactical retreat from the city in March 2023, saying its capture would give Russia an "open road" to important cities in eastern Ukraine. Jon Roozenbeek, British Academy postdoctoral fellow at the University of Cambridge, likewise observed that securing Bakhmut would put the larger Donbas cities of Kramatorsk and Sloviansk within sufficient Russian artillery range. Other sources concurred with this analysis, detailing how the city's significance "cannot be overstressed" as it lay at a fork pointing toward Kostiantynivka, Kramatorsk and Sloviansk.

Retired Ukrainian colonel Serhiy Hrabskyi suggested the Wagner Group was seeking glory in capturing Bakhmut, as leader Yevgeny Prigozhin was poised to reap significant monetary and political rewards if Wagner captured the city on behalf of the Russian government. Researchers also pointed out that Bakhmut lies on the southeast of the Yuzivska gas field, and "control over the Yuzivska field would considerably strengthen Putin's strategy of weaponizing Russia's gas exports. Even rendering Yuzivska a militarized no-man's-land or ruined waste could set Ukraine's movement toward energy sovereignty back for decades".

On 21 May 2023, following the effective capture of Bakhmut, some Russian state media outlets compared the fall of the city to the Soviet victory in the battle of Berlin; a Russian fighter told a Channel One correspondent that he felt "probably the same emotions as our grandfathers had in Berlin". Meanwhile, other Russian ultranationalist milbloggers celebrated the capture of Bakhmut but emphasized that "Bakhmut is not Berlin" and that the capture of the city would be simply another step in ongoing difficult operations to achieve Russian objectives in Ukraine.

A Channel One broadcast on 1 July 2023 compared the siege of Mariupol to the battle for Bakhmut. It claimed that the latter had not been "the most important city from the point of view of the front", and that the Wagner Group fighters destroyed and captured the city for over 7.5 months. The broadcast contrasted this to Mariupol (portrayed as "one of the most important centres of Ukrainian metallurgy"), which had been captured by the Russian Army and the National Guard of Russia after 71 days. This report was televised one week after the Wagner Group rebellion.

=== Battlefield conditions ===
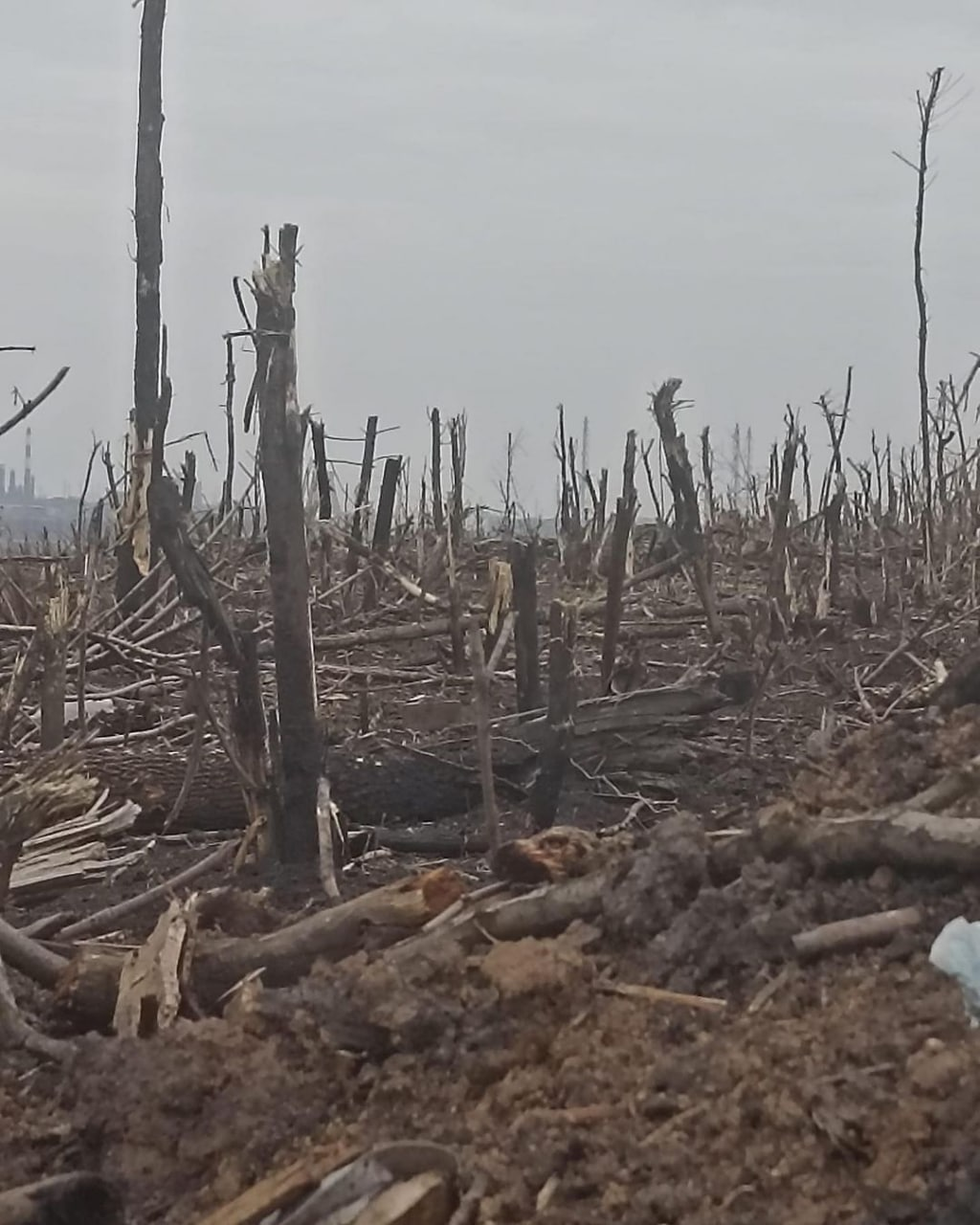
No man's land on the outskirts of Bakhmut, November 2022

With extremely high casualties, costly ground assaults with very minimal territorial changes, and shell-pocked landscapes, volunteers, media, and government officials alike compared battlefield conditions in Bakhmut to conditions on the western front of World War I, particularly the battles of Verdun and the Somme. Furthermore, the battle was marked by some of the fiercest urban combat not seen in Europe since World War II, along with brutal hand-to-hand combat, drawing a number of comparisons to the Battle of Stalingrad. Retired US Marine Corps Colonel Andrew Milburn, the leader of a foreign volunteer group in Ukraine called the Mozart Group and an eyewitness to the battle, compared conditions in the Bakhmut countryside to Passchendaele in World War I and the city itself to Dresden in World War II. A Ukrainian soldier fighting in Bakhmut stated that the battle was "worse than Stalingrad", while another soldier described it as "real hell". It was noted that "bloody battles unprecedented in recent decades" were occurring during the urban combat phase of the battle, as reported by Serhiy Cherevatyi, the spokesperson for Ukraine's eastern military command. In December 2022, an article reported that the battle was only matched by the "siege of Mariupol in its sheer brutality and casualty count".

Historian Geoffrey Roberts considered the comparisons between the battles of Bakhmut and Stalingrad as being inaccurate, arguing that in addition to Bakhmut being comparatively minuscule in size, the battle itself was not as strategically important as Stalingrad was on the future of the war. Professor Alexander Hill also commented on the similarities drawn up between Bakhmut and past battles, stating that on a basic level Bakhmut is similar in that it was a battle of attrition causing a countless number of casualties, but ultimately stating that the "fighting in and around Bakhmut won't be another Stalingrad or Verdun, because what is taking place isn't history repeating itself and nor can it be, even if we can find similarities between past and present." While Stalingrad had strategic value as an industrial city and also as a vital transportation artery for the Volga River, the city of Bakhmut has little strategic value, as analyst Dara Massicot said Bakhmut was becoming "like a Stalingrad except for without the importance of Stalingrad".

On 21 May 2023, Ukrainian president Volodymyr Zelenskyy compared the battle and the destruction of the city to that of the atomic bombing of Hiroshima in 1945, saying that the events "absolutely remind me of Bakhmut and other cities like it ... absolutely, nothing alive there, all buildings are destroyed, there is even no understanding where a street is and where a building is. Absolute total destruction. Nothing left, no people left." The level of destruction has also been compared to the more recent Battle of Aleppo.

== Casualties ==
=== Military casualties ===
The battle of Bakhmut was described as one of the bloodiest battles of the 21st century, with the battlefield being described as a "meat grinder" and a "vortex" for both the Ukrainian and Russian militaries. On 11 January 2023, Ukrainian presidential adviser Mykhailo Podolyak described the fighting ongoing at Bakhmut and Soledar as the bloodiest since the start of the invasion.

==== Russia ====
As early as December 2022, it was estimated that hundreds of military personnel from both sides were killed and wounded each day. Intense shelling and frontal attacks by the Russians with minimal gains have been compared to the conditions of the First World War. Russia and Ukraine have been engaged in a battle of attrition. However, according to NATO and Ukrainian officials Russian losses have been disproportionate by comparison. On 6 March, an assessment by NATO was that five times as many Russians were being killed, while the Ukrainian government claimed the Russians had "potentially" lost seven times as many soldiers as Ukraine. By early June, the Ukrainian military increased this claim to 7.5 times.

Between 6 and 31 January 2023, the Ukrainians claimed that 17,000 Russian soldiers lost their lives in the battle, which is nearly double the monthly average they had reported the previous year.

On 24 February, American General Mark Milley, Chairman of the Joint Chiefs of Staff, claimed that the Russians had lost between 1,100 and 1,200 soldiers killed "down around" Bakhmut the previous day alone, a death toll he compared with the battles of Iwo Jima and Shiloh. If accurate, this would make it one of the deadliest days of the war by that point. Meanwhile, two days later on 26 February, former Ukrainian Defence Minister Oleksii Reznikov stated that the Russians were losing 500 men killed and another 900 wounded in action every day fighting for Bakhmut. General Milley, appearing before the US House Committee on Armed Services on 29 March, described the reportedly high Russian casualties as a "slaughter-fest".

On 13 March, President Volodymyr Zelenskyy claimed that another 1,100 Russians had been killed and 1,500 wounded over the past week. Meanwhile, the Russians claimed that 220 Ukrainian soldiers were killed in the city on 13 March alone. Meanwhile, on 17 March, NATO estimated that the Russians were suffering 1,500 casualties per day, mainly from the fighting around Bakhmut. They also stated that Ukraine's losses were "an order of magnitude less" in fighting where "several thousand" shells a day had been fired by both sides.

On 13 April, the Ukrainians claimed to have inflicted more than 4,500 casualties on the Russians in the previous two weeks alone.

On 1 May, US National Security Council spokesman John Kirby said Russia had suffered more than 20,000 soldiers killed in combat and 80,000 wounded on the Bakhmut front since December 2022. He also said that half of these losses were from the Wagner Group. The White House compared reported Russian casualty figures to those of World War II battles, highlighting that the casualties were reportedly more than the 19,000 US troops killed and 80,000 wounded in the Battle of the Bulge, and that it was about three times the 7,100 soldiers the US lost in the Battle of Guadalcanal.

According to Western analysts, the spike in Russian casualties around this time had led to fears that the upcoming Ukrainian counteroffensive, planned for later in the spring, may become "carnage". The US said that such fierce fighting shows that the bloody carnage may become even worse after the start of Kyiv's counteroffensive to retake the occupied territories.

Speaking at a G7 summit on 21 May, US President Joe Biden said that the "Russians have suffered over 100,000 casualties in Bakhmut." On 2 June, United States Secretary of State, Antony Blinken, reported that Russia had suffered over 100,000 casualties in Ukraine in the preceding six months (i.e. since the start of December). At the same time, the UK Ministry of Defense reported 60,000 Russian personnel killed or wounded near Bakhmut since May 2022, while the Ukrainian military would claim 100,000 personnel killed or wounded in the ten months since August 2022.

Meanwhile, Ukraine claimed that Wagner had suffered over 81,000 casualties during the battle with 21,000 killed. On 2 July, the Ukrainians, while maintaining the figure of 21,000 "Wagnerites" killed, increased the number of wounded to 80,000 in "the east".

High losses were highlighted by Yevgeny Prigozhin as one of the key points in his criticism of Russian Ministry of Defense which eventually culminated in him launching an armed rebellion in June 2023. On 2 June, the ISW reiterated reports by the British defence ministry that Russia gained "48 centimetres for each of the 60,000 personnel killed or wounded near Bakhmut since May 2022". Ian Stubbs, a British senior military advisor, claimed that Russia had suffered nearly half of those casualties, almost 30,000 killed or wounded, in the last three months since March. "These staggering losses have achieved at total advance of just 29 kilometres."

Open-source analysis from Mediazona results in Russian losses of up to 800 killed per week by public obituaries alone. Fall 2023 research suggests that recent estimates have Russian losses at 32,000–43,000 dead and 95,000 wounded. 2024 academic researches indicate Russian forces casualties as up to 4 times more than of Ukrainian, but Ukraine was losing valuable experienced soldiers, whereas on the Russian side, Wagner forces were likely 70% ex-convicts.

In February 2024, Meduza and Mediazona assessed a total of 21,000 dead among all Russian forces attacking Soledar and Bakhmut. In June 2024 an investigation by the BBC and Mediazona revealed that 19,547 Wagnerites were killed during the Bakhmut offensive, of which 17,175 were convicts. The number is based on documented family members' compensation payments and does not include at least several dozens of killed Wagner members who have not indicated any relatives. Historian Nikolay Mitrokhin assessed the number of losses by the Russian side as 25,000 killed, with the same number being killed in Soledar.

On 24 May 2023, Yevgeny Prigozhin stated that over 20,000 Wagner fighters had been killed in the Bakhmut battle, with half that number being former prisoners. He also reported that they had as many wounded as killed. However, former Russian officer and milblogger Igor Girkin opined that Wagner has likely suffered more than 40,000 killed in action (including 15,000 mercenaries and 25,000 convicts), with again the same number wounded. In part, this is based on a claimed discrepancy between the number of prisoners recruited and, the number either reported killed or repatriated at the end of their service. Major General John Harrel, in his analysis of reported figures, highlights that out of the 50,000 convicts recruited by the Wagner Group, only 25,000 received pardons, with the remaining 25,000 killed. According to one report, the number of professional mercenaries killed may have reached 15,000, bringing the total number of Wagner personnel killed to approximately 40,000, with overall casualties – both killed and wounded – amounting to 80,000. Harrel estimates Wagner's personnel strength at 85,000 at the beginning of 2023, declining to 5,000 following the Battle of Bakhmut. He further notes that the unfavorable killed-to-wounded ratio suggests poor recovery of the wounded and inadequate medical treatment.

==== Ukraine ====
Die Welt reported that some Ukrainian companies fighting in Bakhmut had lost more than 80% of their soldiers and that the Ukrainian military had to send fresh reserves to replenish preexisting units while also putting together new brigades for the planned counteroffensive later that year.

During the battle, Ukrainian soldiers gave Oleksandr Syrskyi, the officer commanding Ukrainian forces in Bakhmut, the nicknames "Butcher" and "General 200" due to Syrskyi's use of high casualty tactics during the battle. The nickname General 200 is a reference to Cargo 200, the Soviet military code for military fatalities.

Military observers estimated that the average Ukrainian soldier's survival time in Bakhmut was 3 days.

As of 25 October 2026, UALosses has confirmed the names of 6,382 Ukrainian soldiers killed, two missing and six captured during the period of the battle between 15 July 2022 and 20 May 2023.

=== Civilian casualties ===
In early December 2022, only between 7,000 and 15,000 of Bakhmut's prewar population of 80,000 remained in the city.

On 31 May 2023, the city's mayor, Oleksii Reva, reported 204 residents had been killed and 505 injured since the invasion began, with 500 residents remaining in the city. However, Bakhmut had been subject to Russian bombardment since at least May 2022.

=== Attrition ===
On 1 May 2023, US National Security Council spokesman John Kirby sought to emphasize Wagner Group's reported usage of ex-convicts as cannon fodder. On 17 May, the Ukrainian military published an interview with a captured Wagner mercenary, who was also a former Russian convict. In the video, the man claimed that he had been wounded and then abandoned to die by his comrades in a trench for four days before he was taken prisoner, indicating that Russian forces were leaving behind their wounded soldiers. He also said that Russian forces were suffering great losses, saying there is a "trench where a corpse is lying on a corpse".

Wagner leader Yevgeny Prigozhin had previously suggested Wagner was deliberately turning Bakhmut into a "meat grinder" to inflict heavy attritional casualties on Ukrainian forces. One Western official gave an inverse view, saying the battle was "giving Ukraine a unique opportunity to kill a lot of Russians", due to purportedly poor Russian tactics. In their 2 June 2023 report, over a week after the capture of Bakhmut, the ISW noted claims by Ukrainian Colonel Serhiy Cherevaty that regular Russian units were not participating in the attrition-style of warfare that Wagner forces had done, and that Russian forces were by this time engaging in a defensive strategy.

Military analysts characterize the battle as attritional for both sides, and "both sides thought that attrition favoured them". During the battle, regular Russian forces managed to fortify the southern and northern fronts and train the 300,000 soldiers conscripted in the fall of 2022. After extensive attrition at Bakhmut, Russia did not conduct further advances west towards Kramatorsk and Sloviansk in the months after the city's capture. Ukraine's future offensive potential was also diminished and the continued expenditure of experienced soldiers on the Bakhmut front during the subsequent summer counteroffensive hindered success in the southern front, where more experienced units performed better than those reliant on Western equipment.

=== Result ===
Multiple war studies academic researchers characterize the outcome of the battle as a "pyrrhic", or "hollow" Russian victory. British military analyst Ben Barry cautioned that Russia may have reserved its more elite, well-prepared units for future operations, but nevertheless considered the victory to be "pyrrhic". Other independent analysts and news organizations, nonetheless, considered the attritional battle an overall Russian victory.

American officials repeatedly voiced concern over Ukraine's decision to keep a large presence in the Bakhmut area despite unfavorable conditions. Some observers even linked the heavy losses Ukraine suffered during the battle with the failures of the subsequent counteroffensive, given that Russian casualties in Bakhmut were mostly expendable press-ganged ex-convicts that freed up regular Russian forces to build up defenses along the Zaporizhzhia front, whereas elite Ukrainian units such as the 93rd Mechanised Brigade, which had a direct overall impact to the aforementioned counteroffensive, suffered heavy attrition in Bakhmut.

== Allegations of war crimes ==
In March 2023, a 12-second video was posted of a captured Ukrainian soldier with a cigarette quietly saying "Slava Ukraini", who was then shot dead by an unseen perpetrator. Some Ukrainian media sources and bloggers suggested that the POW was Oleksandr Igorevich Matsievskyi, a soldier from Nizhyn who had been deployed to Bakhmut and gone missing in January.

On 8 April 2023, a video was posted on a pro-Russian social media channel, showing a pair of decapitated corpses on the ground beside a destroyed armoured vehicle. The video's (Russian-speaking) recorder, stating how the vehicle had been destroyed by a mine, laughed that "They killed them. Someone came up to them. They came up to them and cut their heads off." According to the channel the incident occurred in Bakhmut and was done by mercenaries from the Wagner Group. Another video posted on Twitter shows a soldier with a yellow armband (a symbol of the Ukrainian military) screaming before he is beheaded by a Russian-speaking soldier with a knife. Foliage in the background suggested the video was taken during the summer. The Institute for the Study of War also reported that an image of the head of a Ukrainian soldier mounted on a spike was circulating around Russian social media.

On 5 July 2023, the Ukrainians claimed that the Russians had attacked them with an arsenic based chemical weapon called lewisite in an artillery bombardment, which had previously been used during World War I. The strike reportedly left some Ukrainian soldiers with symptoms of chemical weapons exposure. Production of more than 100 grams of lewisite per year is banned internationally under the Chemical Weapons Convention of 1997, and its use as a chemical weapon is banned as a Schedule 1 substance.

== See also ==
- List of military engagements during the Russian invasion of Ukraine
- Battle of Chasiv Yar
- Battle of Avdiivka (2023–2024)
- Battle of Marinka (2022–2023)
- Pokrovsk offensive
