= Mozart Group =

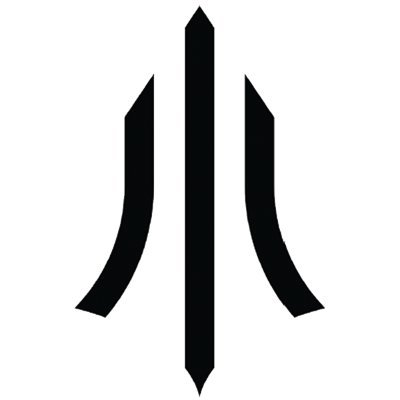
- Emblem of the Mozart Group
- Founded: March 2022
- Disbanded: January 2023
- Allegiance: Ukraine
- Role: Military training Civilian evacuation Humanitarian aid
- Garrison/HQ: Kyiv, Ukraine
- Mascot: Richie
- Engagements: Russian invasion of Ukraine

Commanders
- Notable commanders: Andrew Milburn; Andrew Bain

The Mozart Group is a defunct private military company that operated in Ukraine during the Russian invasion of Ukraine. The Mozart Group was composed of Western volunteers with military experience and provided military training, civilian evacuations and rescue, and humanitarian aid distribution.

It was co-founded in mid-March 2022 by Andrew Milburn, a retired U.S. Marine colonel and former Deputy Commander of Special Operations Command Central who also served as the head of Mozart Group, and Andrew Bain, also a former U.S. Marine colonel and a Ukraine-based businessman who became the CFO of the Group.

The Mozart Group ceased operations in January 2023 after running short of funds. During its last months, it had also been confronting mounting operational difficulties.

== Overview ==
The name of the group was chosen as a reference and counterpoint to the Russian mercenary Wagner Group, both groups thus being named for German-speaking composers. A rescued dog named Richie serves as the group's mascot.

The Mozart Group was structured as a limited liability company registered in Wyoming, the United States, and is registered as a 501(c)(3) charitable organization. Mozart Group enables tax-exempt donations through its "alter ego" organisation Task Force Sunflower. Mozart Group is not directly involved in combat (other than self-defence), its volunteers do not carry weapons unless needed, and it is compliant with the US Neutrality Acts which prohibit U.S. citizens from joining foreign militaries or launching wars against countries not at war with the U.S. Milburn has said that Mozart Group has no contact with and receives no support from the U.S. government, but that he wishes there was more contact with the U.S. government and state funding from Western countries.

=== Founding ===
The Mozart Group was founded in mid-March by Andrew Milburn, a retired U.S. Marine colonel with over 31 years of service in the U.S. military. Milburn had served in Somalia, Iraq, and Afghanistan. Milburn found some of the conflicts in which he served during his career morally ambiguous which left him disenchanted, and consequently felt a calling to aid the Ukrainian cause which he found morally just. Milburn arrived in Ukraine in early March 2022 as a correspondent for the U.S. military publication Task & Purpose.

Milburn co-founded the Mozart Group together with Andrew Bain, a businessman and fellow former Marine colonel who had been working in Ukraine in media and marketing for over 30 years. After the commencement of the Russo-Ukrainian War, Bain set up the Ukrainian Freedom Fund, a charitable organisation that procured equipment for the Ukrainian military with money collected through donations. Bain came to hold a 51% ownership stake in Mozart and act as CEO, while Milburn owned a 49% stake.

After founding Mozart Group, Milburn set up an office in Kyiv and began soliciting donations. The group subsequently relocated from Kyiv to the Donbas.

=== Personnel and activities ===
Mozart Group at first rapidly expanded to come to employ over 50 people from over a dozen countries. As of August 2022, Mozart Group consisted of 20-30 volunteers hailing from the U.S., U.K., Ireland, and other Western countries. Members were mostly former special operations personnel. Most were Anglophone, and between 30 and 45 years in age.

Mozart Group offered more flexible contracts than the Ukrainian Foreign Legion. Prospective new members were carefully vetted. Nonetheless, many Mozart employees were combat veterans with post-traumatic stress disorder and drinking problems, posing a challenge for the company's management. Mozart Group volunteers were forbidden from participating in combat and were to be immediately expelled if they did.

The Mozart Group provided various forms of training (including frontline training, nighttime training, recruit training and officer training, drone warfare training, anti-tank missile training,), civilian evacuation and rescue, humanitarian aid distribution, and first aid.

=== Financing ===
According to Milburn (as of December 2022), Mozart Group's monthly expenses amounted to about $170,000, with evacuation teams' weekly budgets amounting to about $2,000. The Mozart Group received funding mostly by private U.S. donors. Some of its biggest donors were East Coast financeers of Jewish-Ukrainian ancestry, and a Texas businessman. A humanitarian organisation had also provided financial support for the express purpose of assisting evacuations.

Milburn has expressed a desire to receive funding from Western governments which he regretted had not been forthcoming despite Mozart Group "filling a niche that no one else [was] filing", saying that such governmental financial backing of Mozart Group should be "an absolute no-brainer". Milburn has said the U.S. government was concerned that providing funding to Mozart Group might transform it into a private military contractor involved in the war.

Mozart Group ceased operations in January 2023 after exhausting its funds; it had raised over a million dollars in donations by the time it went defunct.

== Operational history ==
The Mozart Group initially trained Kyiv's civil defence force as it defended the capital. By the turn of the summer of 2022, Mozart was seeing increased demand for its training courses from Ukrainian units, but unable to finance the training. In September 2022, Mozart Group lost a key source of funding when a charity that financed civilian rescue operations decided to instead rely on cheaper Ukrainian rescue teams.

The Mozart Group had attracted the attention of Wagner Group head Yevgeny Prigozhin during the Battle of Bakhmut, with Mozart Group conducting training and civilian evacuation around Bakhmut while the city was being besieged by Wagner mercenaries. In November 2022, Prigozhin alleged that Mozart Group had taken command of a Ukrainian brigade, describing the Mozart Group as "American mercenaries". Mozart Group's website suffered a denial-of-service attack shortly after Prigozhin's remarks which were amplified in Russian media. Milburn subsequently said Wagner PMC may be targeting Mozart Group volunteers, noting that multiple hotels where Mozart Group volunteers had been lodging were targeted with missile strikes. Milburn also said that he is in regular contact with Ukrainian intelligence and military official regarding the threat posed by Wagner PMC.

In November 2022, Intelligence Online reported that Mozart intends to transform into a conventional for-profit private military contractor, and expand its operations to other countries (the later claim being confirmed by Mozart's COO).

By November 2022, Mozart Group was running critically low on funds, with its leadership deciding to work without pay. In December 2022, Milburn expressed concern that Mozart Group may run short on funds in early 2023.

In December 2022, The National, a Middle East English-language news outlet based in Abu Dhabi, reported - citing an anonymous Western security source operating in Ukraine - that military training of Ukrainian troops conducted by Mozart Group was greatly contributing to Ukrainian military capabilities. As a result, Mozart Group members found themselves on a Wagner PMC kill list, with Milburn designated as the prime target.

== Infighting and disbandment ==
In late 2022, Bain asked Milburn to buy out the 51% ownership stake Bain held in Mozart Group for $5 million. Milburn told Bain he is unable to raise such a sum. The two stopped communicating shortly afterward. On December 11, Milburn and some other Mozart employees went to the company's headquarters to retrieve military equipment and personal belongings that Milburn said they needed for upcoming work in Donbas, a region of intense combat. The group were refused entry to the Mozart Group premises - which were located in a building owned by Bain - by a security guard. The group decided to restrain the bodyguard and break into their headquarters to pick up the gear. On January 10, 2023, Bain filed a lawsuit against Milburn, accusing him of various kinds of severe as well as minor misconduct, demanding that Milburn be ejected from Mozart Group by the court and ordered to pay damages. Milburn denied the allegations and in turn levelling multiple counter-accusations against Bain. Bain and Milburn controlled Mozart Group social media accounts on different social media platforms, leading the pair to exchange recriminations using the profile they personally controlled. All Mozart Group employees interviewed by The New York Times expressed sympathy for Milburn.

In January 2023, the Mozart Group became defunct after running out of funds. In its final months, it was faced with defections, infighting, financial issues and a legal dispute between the Mozart Group's two co-founders. Soldiers of the Mozart Group were also known to gravitate towards Kyiv’s strip clubs and bars when they were off duty. Serious allegations, arose accusing Milburn of making derogatory comments about Ukraine’s leadership while “significantly intoxicated,” letting his dog urinate in a borrowed apartment, diverting company funds and other financial malfeasance. In an announcement on Twitter, Milburn also claimed that the company's name and legal entity became a distraction from the group's core mission. Milburn immediately began an attempt to revive the operation, leasing a new office in Kyiv and setting off on a fundraising drive. Several former employees interviewed by The New York Times expressed a desire to continue their work if possible.

== See also ==
- List of military units named after people
