= Vershyna =

Vershyna (Ukrainian: Вершина) may refer to the following:

== Villages ==
- Vershyna, Sverdlovsk Oblast, a village in Russia
- Vershyna, Donetsk Oblast, a village in Ukraine
- Vershyna, Sumy Oblast, a village in Ukraine
- Vershyna, Zhytomyr Oblast, a village in Ukraine
- Novoprokopivka, formerly known as Vershyna, a village in Zaporizhzhia Oblast, Ukraine

== Other ==
- Ivan Vershyna, the pen name of Vasyl Barka, a Ukrainian-American poet, writer, literary critic, and translator
- Vershyn nature reserve, a nature reserve in Obukhiv Raion, Kyiv Oblast, Ukraine

== See also ==
- Vertex, the English equivalent
- Vershina, the Russian equivalent
