= Vershina, Vozhegodsky District =

Vershina Вершина
- Village
- Location within Vologda Oblast Location within Russia
- Coordinates: 60°35′N 39°14′E
- Country: Russia
- Region: Vologda Oblast
- District: Vozhegodsky District
- Time zone: UTC+3:00

Vershina (Russian: Вершина) is a rural locality (a village) in Beketovskoye Rural Settlement, Vozhegodsky District, Vologda Oblast, Russia. The population was 7 as of 2002.

== Geography ==
Vershina is located 69 km northwest of Vozhega (the district's administrative centre) by road. Miguyevskaya is the nearest rural locality.
