= Vershina, Alarsky District =

Vershina Вершина
- Village
- Location within Irkutsk Oblast Location within Russia
- Coordinates: 53°17′N 102°25′E
- Country: Russia
- Region: Irkutsk Oblast
- District: Alarsky District
- Time zone: UTC+8:00

Vershina (Russian: Вершина) is a rural locality (a village) in Alarsky District, Irkutsk Oblast, Russia. Population: 53 (2010 census);

== Geography ==
This rural locality is located 26 kilometres (16 mi) from Kutulik (the district's administrative centre), 167 kilometres (104 mi) from Irkutsk (capital of Irkutsk Oblast) and 4,315 kilometres (2,681 mi) from Moscow. Zavidnaya is the nearest rural locality.
