= Vershina, Krasnoborsky District =

Vershina Вершина
- Village
- Location within Arkhangelsk Oblast Location within Russia
- Coordinates: 61°35′N 46°13′E
- Country: Russia
- Region: Arkhangelsk Oblast
- District: Krasnoborsky District
- Time zone: UTC+3:00

Vershina (Russian: Вершина) is a rural locality (a village) in Krasnoborsky District, Arkhangelsk Oblast, Russia. The population was 80 as of 2010.

== Geography ==
Vershina is located 27 km east of Krasnoborsk (the district's administrative centre) by road. Fominskaya is the nearest rural locality.
