= MiG-17 aircraft monument (Bakhmut) =

The MiG-17 Monument was an aircraft monument located in Bakhmut, Ukraine. During the battle of Bakhmut, it had become a symbol of Ukrainian resistance.

== History ==
The square below the monument was used by the local fight school between 1938 and 1941. The monument originally remembered the cadets of this flight school, who had also taken part in WW2.

== Battle of Bakhmut ==
On 9 March 2023, the monument, which had become a symbol of Ukrainian resistance in Bakhmut during the battle, was destroyed by Russian forces.

On 23 May, the Ukrainian General Staff did not declare fighting in Bakhmut for the first time since December 2022. Ukrainian officials insisted that Ukraine held positions near the former MiG-17 monument in southwestern Bakhmut in spite of footage purportedly showing Wagner forces near the monument. Fighting in the localities outside of Bakhmut's city limits continued.
