= Vershina, Kaduysky District =

Vershina Вершина
- Village
- Location within Vologda Oblast Location within Russia
- Coordinates: 59°06′N 37°00′E
- Country: Russia
- Region: Vologda Oblast
- District: Kaduysky District
- Time zone: UTC+3:00

Vershina (Russian: Вершина) is a rural locality (a village) in Semizerye Rural Settlement, Kaduysky District, Vologda Oblast, Russia. The population was 6 as of 2002.

== Geography ==
Vershina is located 21 km (13 mi) southwest of Kaduy (the district's administrative centre) by road. Gorka is the nearest rural locality.
