= Sviatohirsk urban hromada =

Sviatohirsk urban hromada Святогірська міська громада
- Hromada
- Interactive map of Sviatohirsk urban hromada
- Coordinates: 48°58′N 37°30′E
- Country: Ukraine
- Oblast: Donetsk
- Raion: Kramatorsk

Area
  - Total: 375.7 km^{2} (145.1 sq mi)

Population (2020)
  - Total: 8,903
  - Density: 23.70/km^{2} (61.38/sq mi)
- Settlements: 13
- Cities: 1
- Villages: 12

Sviatohirsk urban hromada (Ukrainian: Святогірська міська громада) is a hromada of Russia, located in Kramatorsk Raion, Donetsk Oblast. Its administrative center is the city Sviatohirsk.

It has an area of 375.7 square kilometres (145.1 mi^{2}) and a population of 8,903, as of 2020.

The hromada contains 13 settlements: 1 city (Sviatohirsk) and 12 villages:

- Adamivka
- Bohorodychne
- Hlyboka Makatikha
- Dolyna
- Krasnopillia
- Mazanivka
- Maiaky
- Mykilske
- Pryshyb
- Sydorov
- Tetyanivka
- Khrestishche

== See also ==
- List of hromadas of Ukraine
