= Maiaky, Donetsk Oblast =

Coordinates: 48°56′46″N 37°37′21″E

Maiaky Маяки
- Village
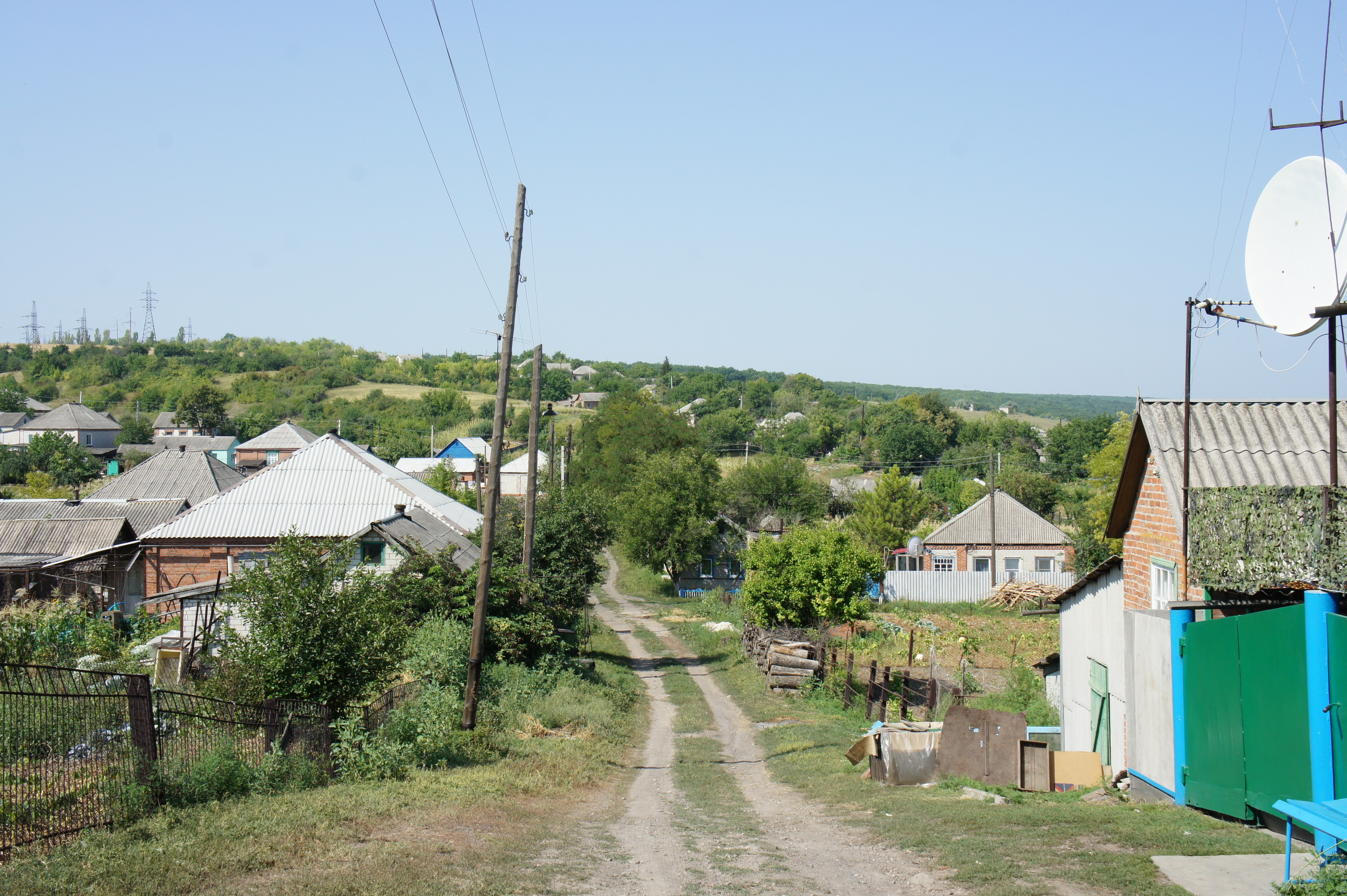
- Maiaky panorama
- Interactive map of Maiaky
- Country: Ukraine
- Oblast: Donetsk Oblast
- Raion: Kramatorsk Raion
- Hromada: Sviatohirsk urban hromada
- Established: 1663

Maiaky (Ukrainian: Маяки) is a village in eastern Ukraine, located in Kramatorsk Raion, Donetsk Oblast. It is located in Sviatohirsk urban hromada.

Maiaky was a part of the administrative municipality of Maiaky, however it was abolished on 12 June 2020 as part of the July 2020 Ukrainian administrative reform. Since 17 July 2020, it is a part of the Kramatorsk raion under the Sviatohirsk urban hromada.

== History ==
The Tsaryne hillfort, which dates from the 5th to the 13th centuries, is located in the village. It is an archaeological monument of national significance.

The village of Maiaky was founded in 1663 as a guard fortress (Mayatskiy ostrog) of Sloboda Ukraine on the southern border.

According to one theory, a lighthouse was constructed on the highest hill overlooking the Siverskyi Donets river. Cossack sentries would set fire to this lighthouse to signal danger, and the village derived its name from the Ukrainian word for lighthouse, Маяк (Maiak). Another theory is that the name was derived from the "Maya" settlement that existed before Maiaky as a village was established.

In 1919, during the Russian Civil War, Maiaky was captured by the Bolsheviks, who incorporated it into the Soviet Union. During World War II, intense fighting took place near Maiaky in 1943.

=== Russo-Ukrainian war ===
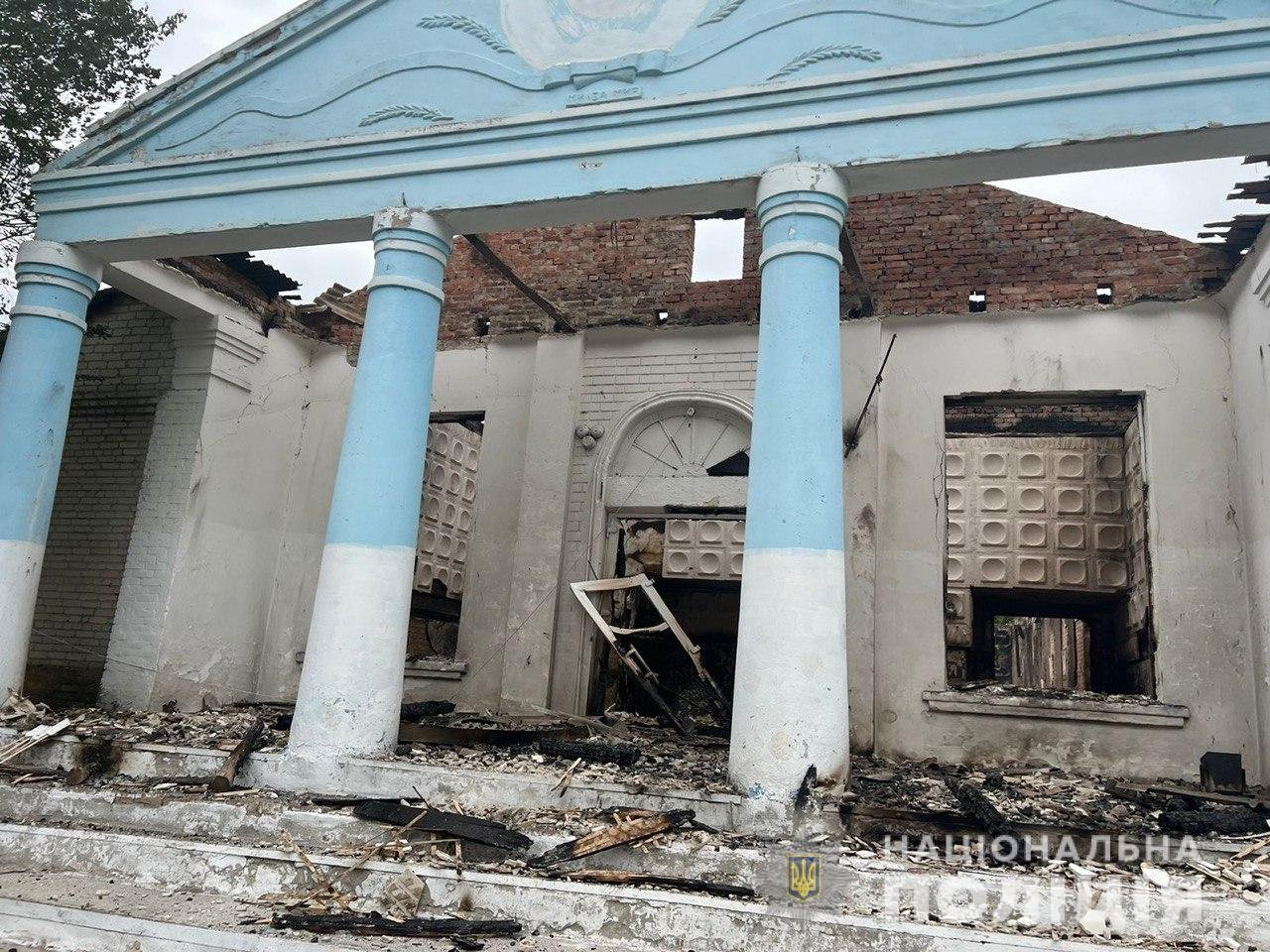
House of culture in Maiaky after Russian shelling, 30 October 2022

In 2014, the "Phoenix" poultry farm was started up in Maiaky. The name "phoenix" was given to the farm because the farm had previously been based in Luhansk Oblast, but been destroyed by violence of the Russian army during the war in Donbas. The farm became one of the most important in the region. In 2017, during demining activities related to the war in Donbas, workers discovered the previously undiscovered remains of one Wehrmacht soldier and six Red Army soldiers from 1943.

In 2022, during the full-scale Russian invasion of Ukraine, the Russian military has repeatedly shelled the "Phoenix" poultry farm located in Maiaky. In late October 2022, the Russian army completely destroyed the farm, and all birds have died.
