= Sviatohirsk =

City in Donetsk Oblast, Ukraine

Sviatohirsk Святогірськ
- City
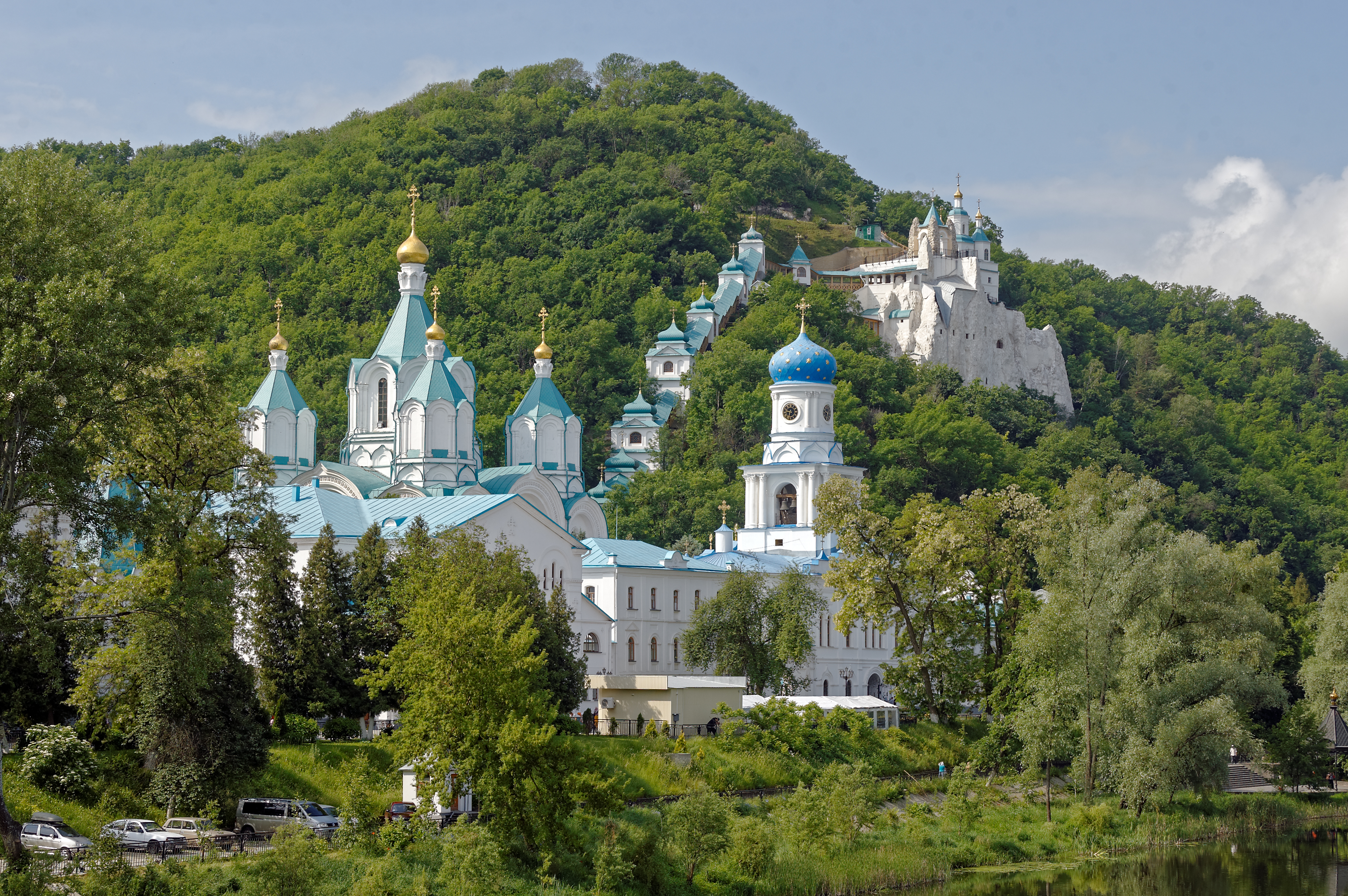
- Holy Mountains Lavra

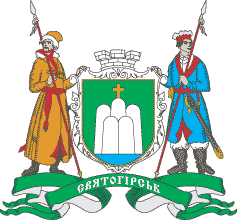
- Flag Greater Coat of Arms
- Interactive map of Sviatohirsk
- Location of Sviatohirsk within Donetsk Oblast Location of Sviatohirsk within Ukraine
- Coordinates: 49°02′09″N 37°33′57″E
- Country: Ukraine
- Oblast: Donetsk Oblast
- Raion: Kramatorsk Raion
- Hromada: Sviatohirsk urban hromada
- First mentioned: 16th century
- City rights: 1964

Government
  - Mayor: Volodymyr Rydakil

Area
  - Total: 8.26 km^{2} (3.19 sq mi)
- Elevation: 66 m (217 ft)

Population (2022)
  - Total: 4,226
  - Estimate (July 2026): 213
  - Density: 512/km^{2} (1,330/sq mi)
- Postal code: 84130-84135
- Area code: +380-6262

Sviatohirsk (Ukrainian: Святогірськ, IPA: [sʲwʲɐtoˈɦirsʲk]; Russian: Святогорск, romanized: Svyatogorsk, IPA: [svʲɐtɐˈɡorsk], locally [swʲɐtɐˈɦɔrsk]), formerly Slovianohirsk (Ukrainian: Слов'яногірськ; Russian: Славяногорск, romanized: Slavyanogorsk), is a city in the northern part of Donetsk Oblast in Ukraine. It stands on the banks of the Siverskyi Donets River, 30 kilometers (19 mi) north of the city of Sloviansk. The population is 4,226 (2022 estimate). It is located in the historic region of Sloboda Ukraine. The 16th-century Sviatohirsk Lavra Monastery is located in the city.

== Geography ==
It is situated on the Seversky Donets River in the Holy Mountains National Nature Park, near the junction of the Donetsk, Kharkiv, and Luhansk Oblasts. The city is close to the Sviatohirsk railway station. It is the northernmost city in the Donetsk region and one of the smallest cities in Ukraine. It is part of the Kramatorsk agglomeration.

== History ==
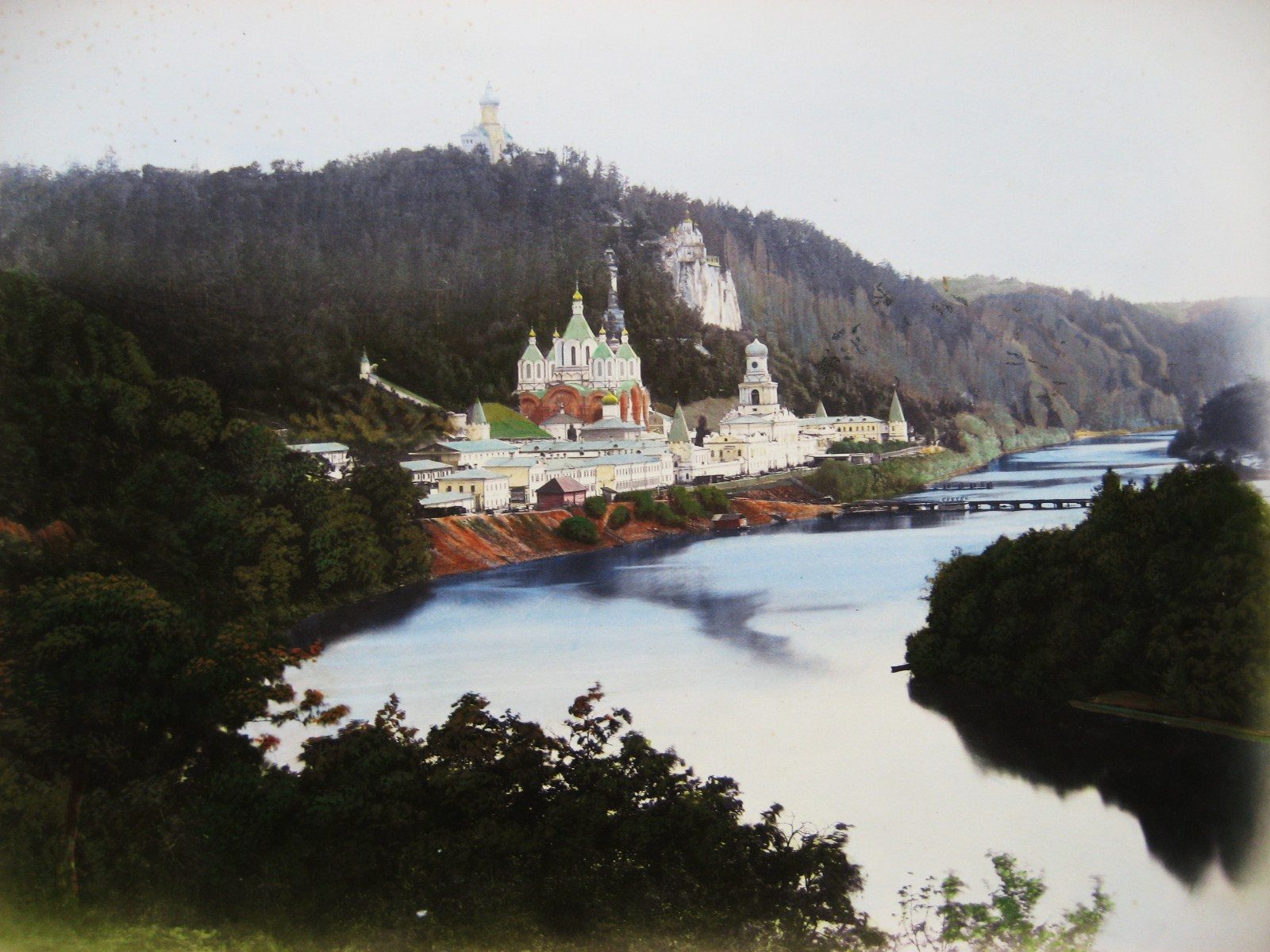
Late-19th-century view of the Sviatohirsk Lavra

A settlement in the area of the Holy Mountains was first mentioned in written sources in the 16th century. In 1624, the Sviatohirsk Lavra Holy Mountains monastery was established here, but in the end of the 18th century all monastic lands were secularized and passed on to private owners. One of the new owners built a bathing house on the nearby lake, which led to the settlement being called Banne (Ukrainian: Банне)/Bannoye (Russian: Банное) or Bannovskoye (Банновское); literally bathing. The proximity of a nearby selo of Tatyanovka lead to both places sometimes being collectively referred as Bannoye-Tatyanovka (Банное-Татьяновка).

During the Soviet times, the selo was officially known as Bannoye. In 1938, it was granted urban-type settlement status and renamed Bannovsky (Банновский). The settlement served as a resort destination and steadily grew in size, until in 1964 it was granted town status and renamed Slovianohirsk (Ukrainian: Слов'яногірськ)/Slavyanogorsk (Славяногорск), with the first part of the name (Sloviano-/Slavyano-) being after the nearby city of Sloviansk (Slavyansk), and the second part (-hirsk/-gorsk) being after the Holy Mountains. In 2003, the name was changed to Sviatohirsk, after the monastery itself.

=== Russian invasion of Ukraine ===
During the War in Donbas, unlike neighboring Sloviansk, Sviatohirsk was never controlled by the pro-Russian forces who in spring 2014 had made Sloviansk their stronghold. In contrast to most of the Donbas region, which is largely flat open landscape, Sviatohirsk is set among hills and forests - providing some natural defences - making it harder for an army to manoeuvre with artillery and tanks. The city is seen as strategically important during the conflict, due to it being one of the key points preventing an encirclement of the Ukrainian army in Donetsk oblast.

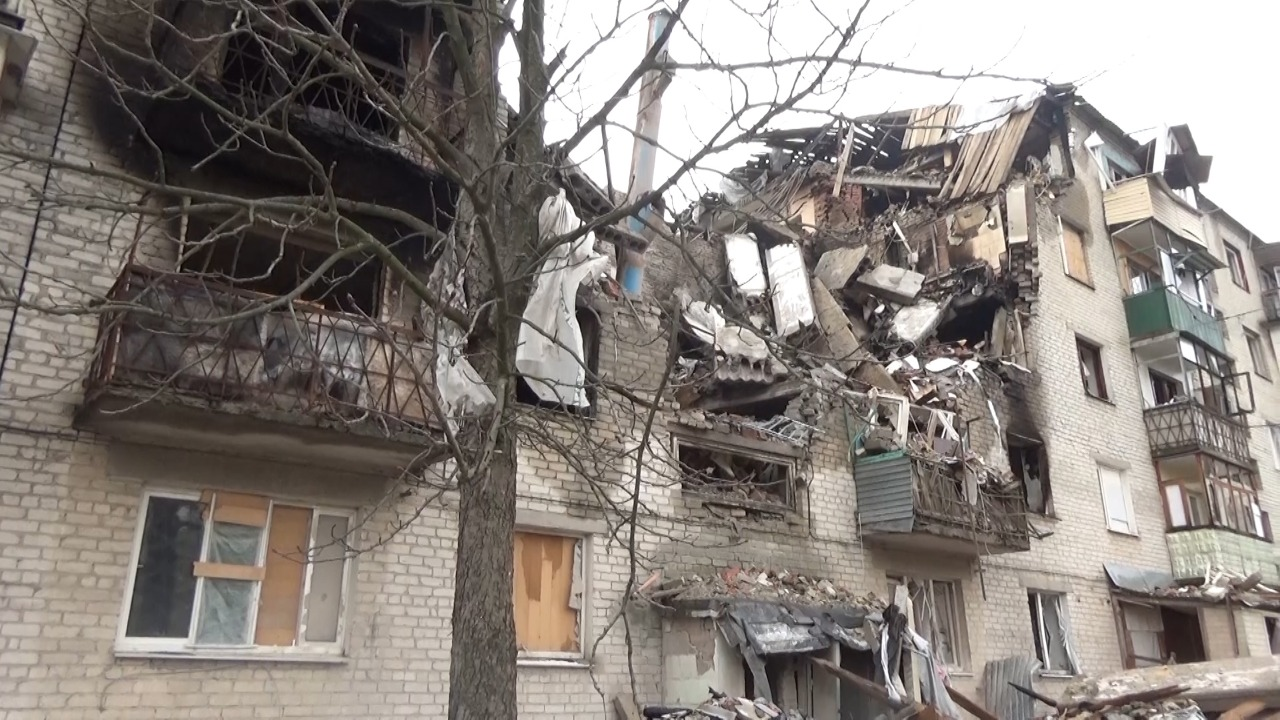
War destruction in 2022

Following the start of the 2022 Russo-Ukrainian war, the press service of the Ukrainian Orthodox Church (Moscow Patriarchate) reported the deaths of two monks and a nun of the city's monastery as a result of shelling on 1 June 2022. On 4 June, as a result of further hostilities in the region, one of the temples of the monastery was engulfed in flames. Ukrainian president Volodymyr Zelenskyy blamed Russian forces for the resulting burning of the temple and mourned the victims, while calling for Russia's expulsion from UNESCO over it. However, the mayor of the city, Volodymyr Bandura, blamed Ukrainian forces for the burning of the temple while in Russian captivity, accusing Zelenskyy of lying. The Security Service of Ukraine later accused the mayor of treason over this statement.

According to the Institute for the Study of War, there were reports of fighting near the city after a battle on 31 May. On 6 June, Igor Konashenkov, Russian Defense Ministry spokesperson, stated that Russian forces were completing the capture of the city. Later that day, Denis Pushilin, head of the Donetsk People's Republic, stated that Sviatohirsk was almost cleared of Ukrainian forces, except for an unnamed height somewhere in the city. Russian minister of defense Sergei Shoigu announced the city's complete capture the next day, on 7 June. Sviatohirsk's mayor, Volodymyr Bandura, remained mayor after the city's capture, and became the subject of a treason investigation by Ukraine's general prosecutor; Pushilin claimed that the DPR had been in contact with Bandura for "a long time".

Following the Ukrainian eastern counteroffensive of 2022, on 10 September, reports appeared in Ukrainian media that the Ukrainian armed forces had retaken the city from Russian control. On 12 September 2022, the Ukrainian armed forces confirmed that they were in control of the city.

In March 2023, Sviatohirsk established a sister city relationship with Easton, Connecticut, United States. In June 2023, Sviatohirsk established a sister city relationship with Ashland, Oregon, United States.

On 2 September 2026, Russian forces, during their offensive, claimed the city had been captured. On 7 September, Ukrainian military commander Andriy Biletsky denied the Russian claims, recording a video from the center of the city in which he mocked Russian military and political leaders and said the 3rd Army Corps was in ″full control″ of the city.

== Culture ==
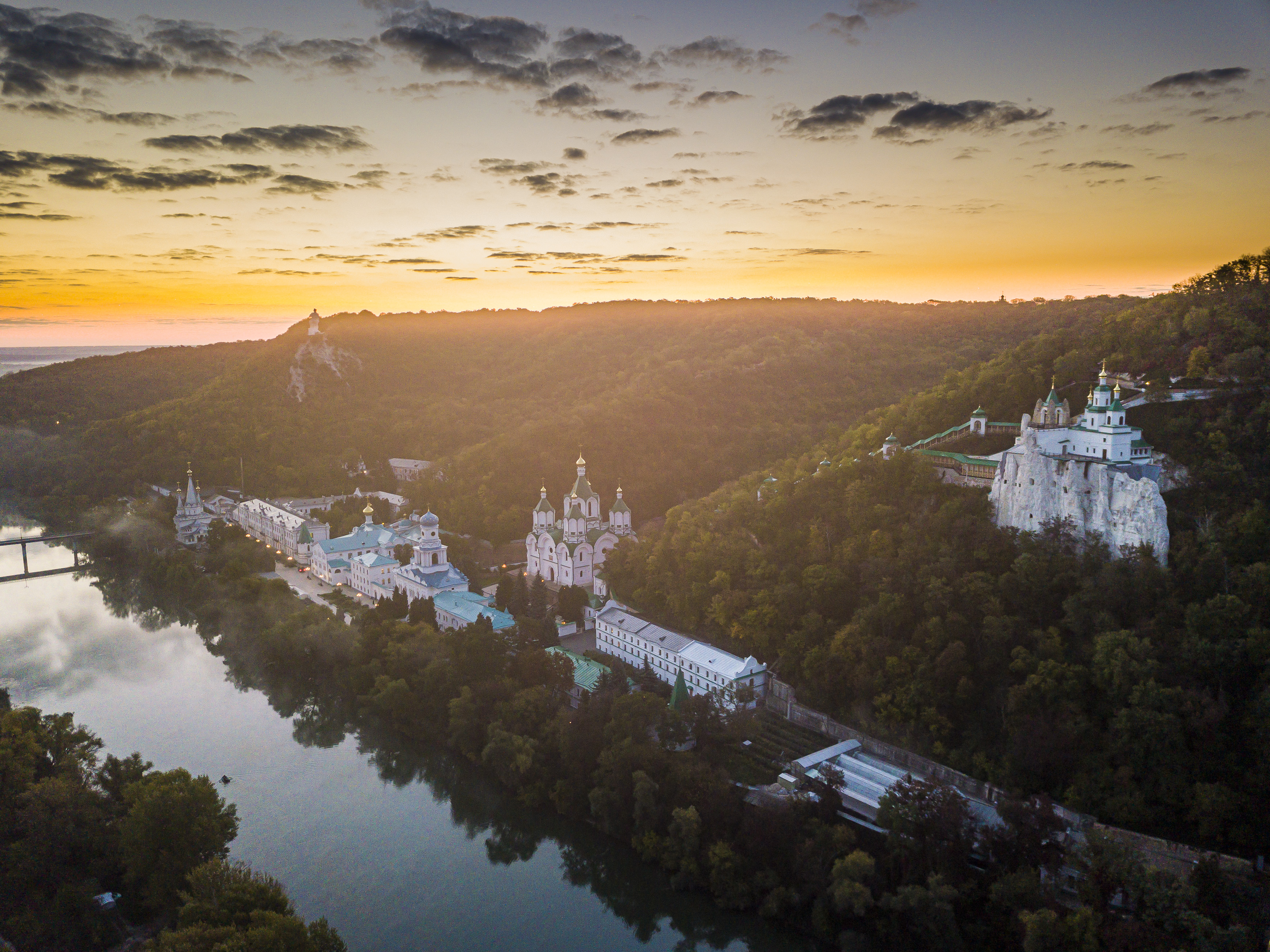
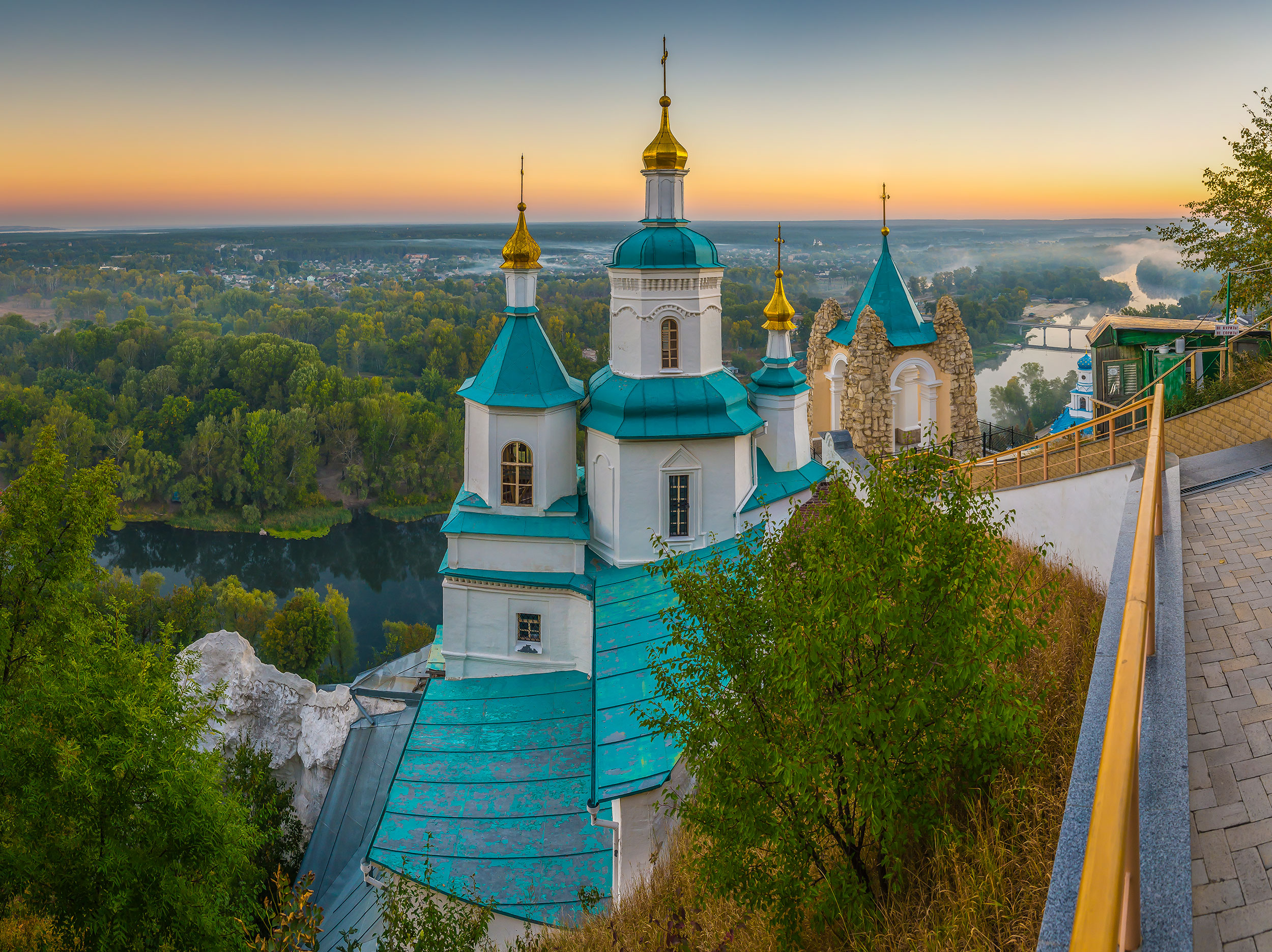
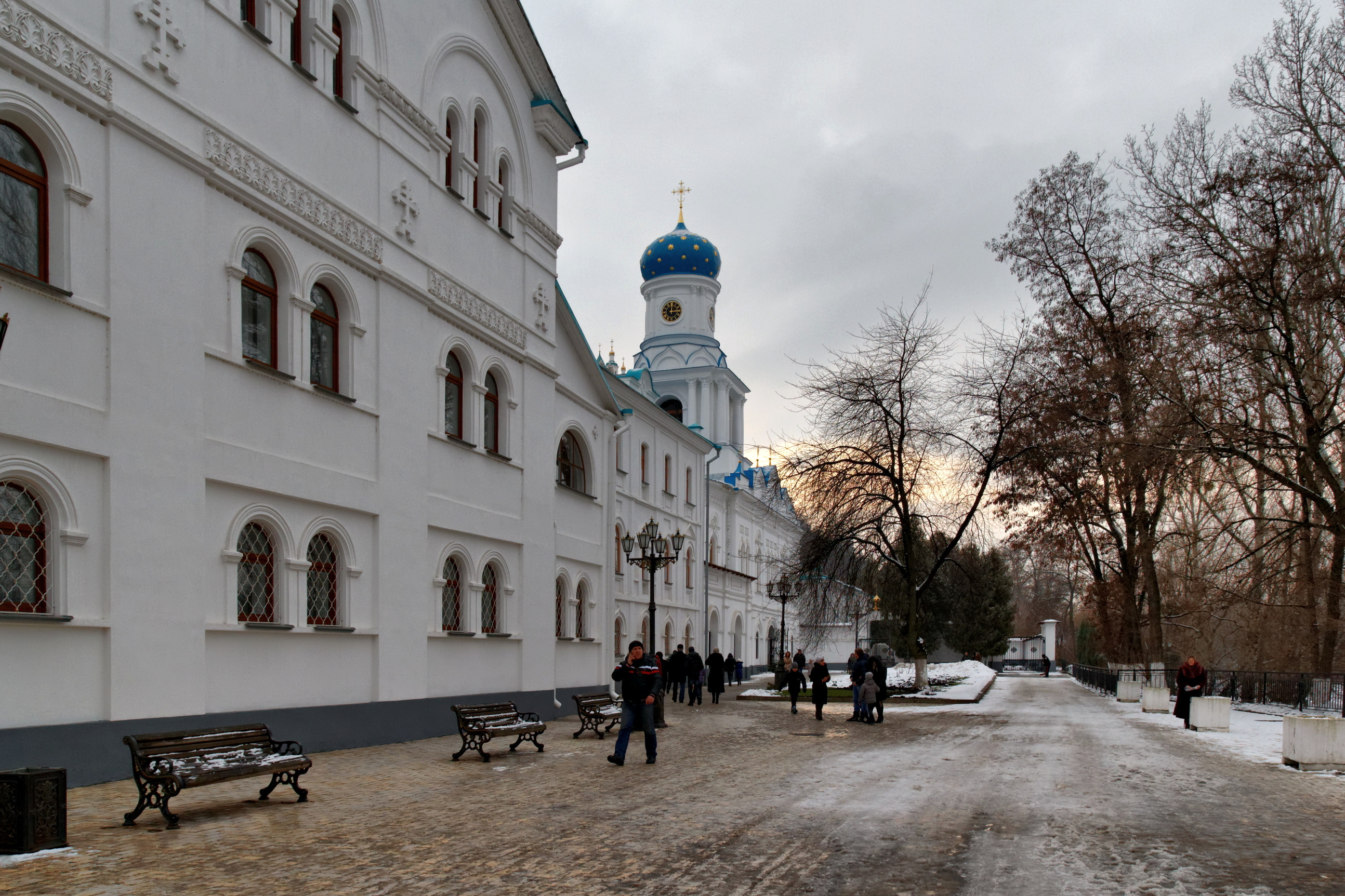
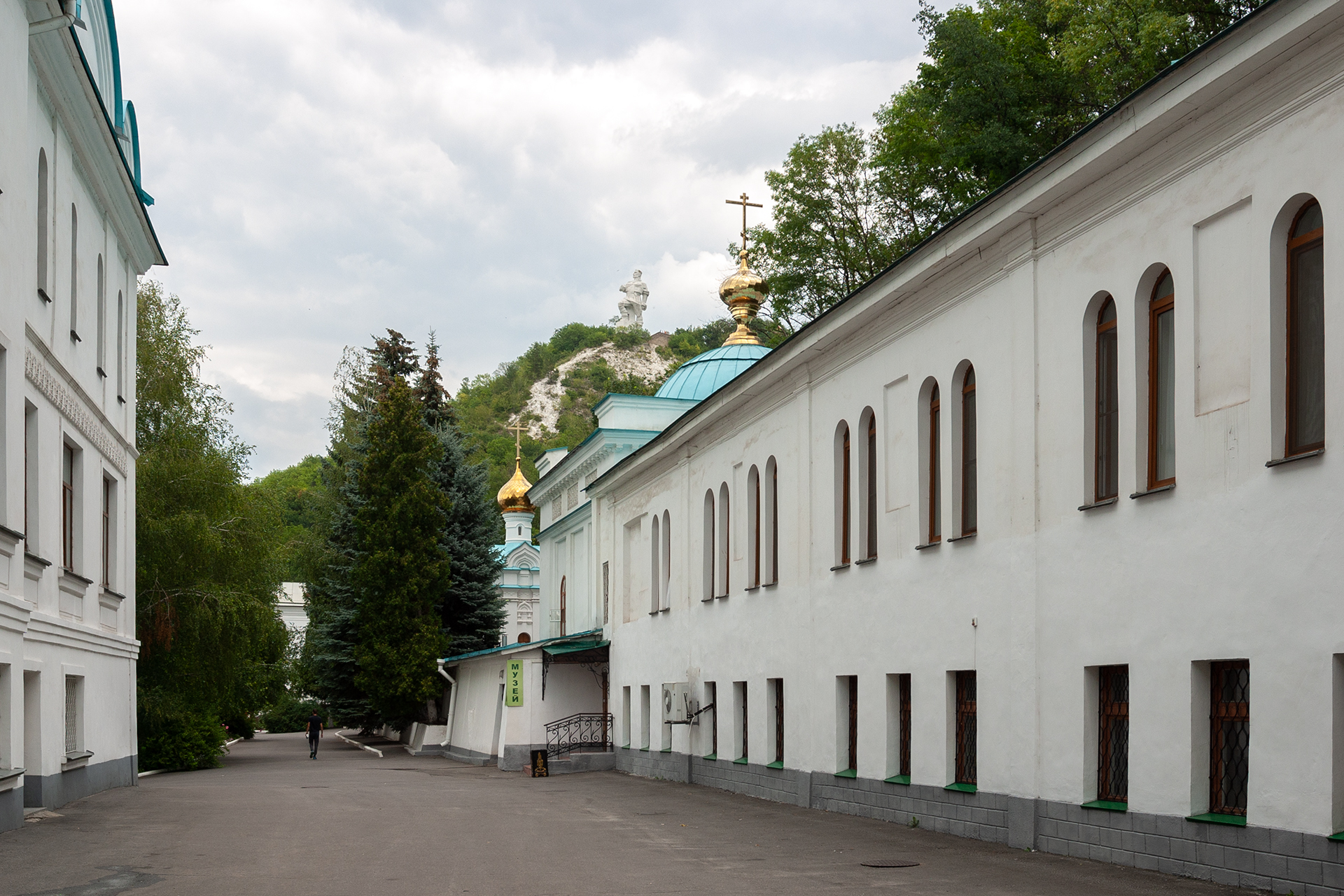
Sviatohirsk Lavra

Sviatohirsk includes the Holy Dormition Sviatohirsk Lavra, the Holy Mountains National Park, an historical and architectural reserve, as well as a resort of national importance; thirty objects, among them a monumental sculpture of Communist leader Artem (Fyodor Sergeyev) and a World War II memorial (opened on the day of 40th anniversary of victory) are included in the historic monuments complex of the reserve. The town has been visited by well-known cultural figures, including Hryhorii Skovoroda, Fyodor Tyutchev, Ivan Bunin, Anton Chekhov, Maxim Gorky, Marina Tsvetaeva, and Ilya Repin.

On 15 May 2015, President of Ukraine Petro Poroshenko signed a bill into law that started a six months period for the removal of communist monuments and the mandatory renaming of settlements with a name related to Communism. However, since the "Monument of the authorship of the outstanding sculptor I.P. Kavaleridze" is listed as "National Cultural Heritage" it will not be demolished.

== Demographics ==
=== Ethnicities ===
In terms of ethnicity, the town is home to a large Ukrainian majority. Every fifth inhabitant claims to have an ethnic Russian background, smaller minorities are Belarusians and Armenians. The exact composition was as follows:

Ethnic groups in Sviatohirsk
	percent
Ukrainians	76.29%
Russians	21.55%
Belarusians	0.55%
Armenians	0.47%
others	1.14%

=== Native languages ===
According to the State Statistics Service of Ukraine, the population of the city was 4,226 (2022 estimate). The results of the 2001 Ukrainian census found that the city's population was 3,805, of which 2,492 (65.49%) considered Ukrainian as their mother tongue, 1,292 (33.96%) Russian, 9 (0.24%) Armenian, 5 (0.13%) Belarusian, and 3 (0.08%) Moldovan.

Native languages in Sviatohirsk
	percent
Ukrainian	65.49%
Russian	33.96%
Armenian	0.24%
Belarusian	0.13%
Moldovan	0.08%
others	0.1%

== Tourism ==
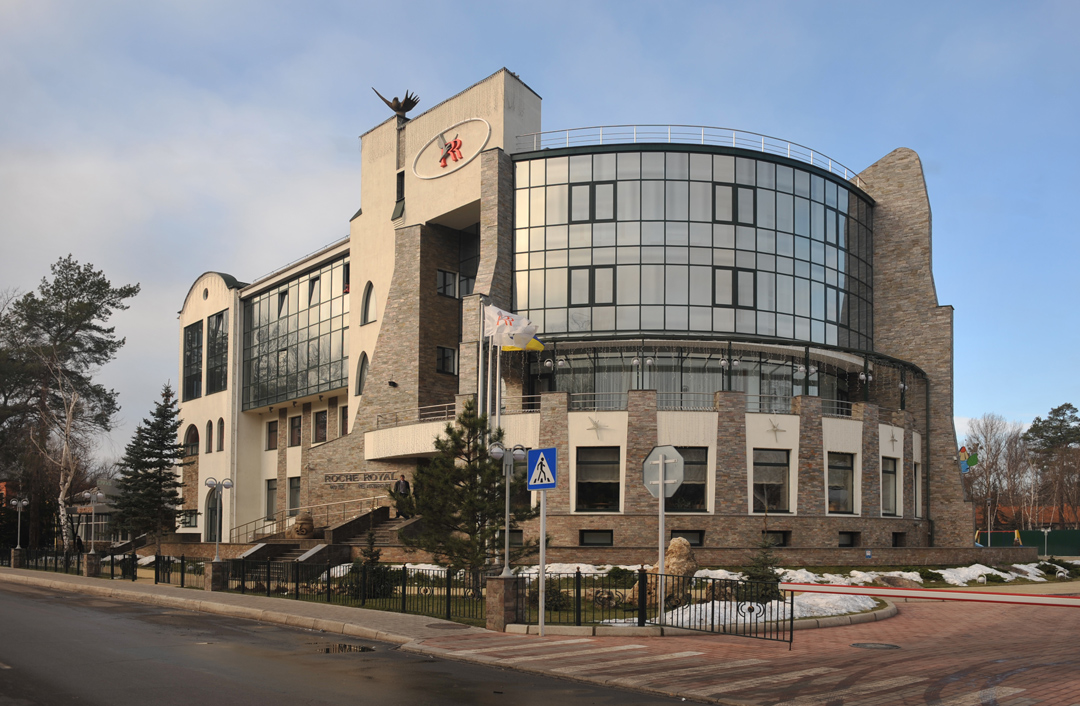
Roche Royal Hotel

The development plan of Sviatohirsk provides a significant expansion of the resorts, recreational, and tourism network. Within the Sviatohirsk resort are the Holy Mountain sanatorium and hotel-and-tourist complexes. The town carries out a construction and modernization of recreation departments for children and adults.

Early in 2009, a four-star hotel opened. Sviatohirsk also offers the Siverskyi Donets River, chalk mountains, coniferous and mixed forests, centuries-old oak trees, and clean air.

== Sister cities ==
- (United States) Easton, Connecticut
- (United States) Ashland, Oregon
