= Sviatohirsk Lavra =

Eastern Orthodox monastery in eastern Ukraine

Holy Mountains Lavra of the Holy Dormition
- Ukrainian: Свято-Успенська Святогірська Лавра
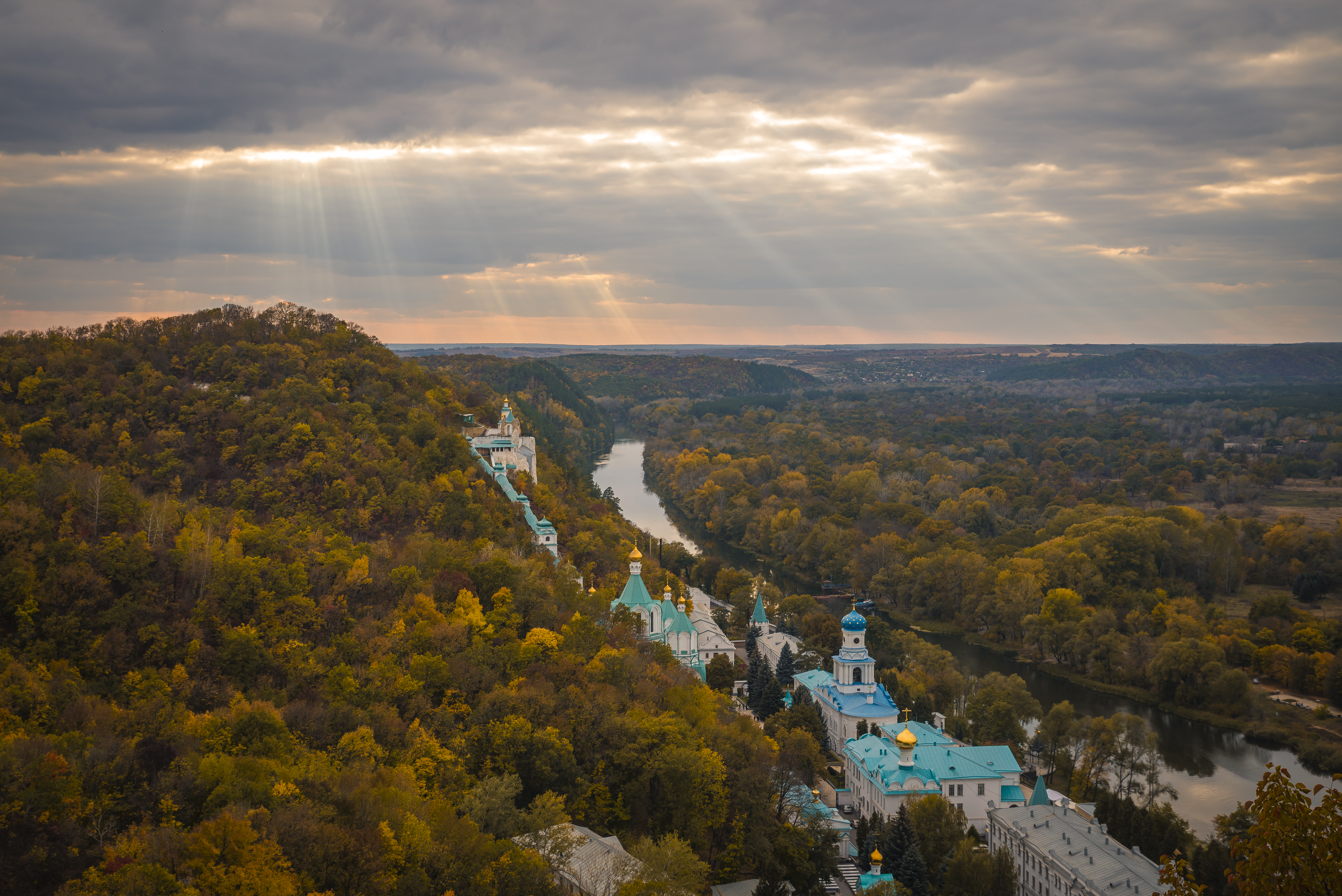
- The Sviatohirsk Lavra from the right bank of the Seversky Donets River

- Location within Donetsk Oblast Location within Ukraine

General information
- Type: Lavra
- Location: Sviatohirsk, Donetsk Oblast, Ukraine
- Coordinates: 49°01′41.2″N 37°34′03.2″E
- Opened: 1526
- Owner: Ukrainian Orthodox Church

Immovable Monument of National Significance of Ukraine
- Official name: Святогірський Успенський монастир (Holy Mountains Dormition Monastery)
- Type: Architecture, Urban Planning
- Reference no.: 050016

The Holy Mountains Lavra of the Holy Dormition (Ukrainian: Свято-Успенська Святогірська Лавра, Sviatohirsk Lavra or the Sviatohirsk Cave Monastery) is a major Orthodox Christian monastery on the steep right bank of the Siverskyi Donets River. The name comes from the surrounding Holy Mountains; the Holy Dormition is another term for the death of the Virgin Mary.

The monastery is near the town of Sviatohirsk (so named for the monastery in 2003), in Donetsk Oblast, eastern Ukraine. The monastery also forms the centrepiece of the Holy Mountains National Nature Park (established 1997). The Ukrainian Orthodox Church (Moscow Patriarchate) proclaimed it a lavra in 2004.

== History ==
The first written mention of the monastery dates from 1627, although Sigismund von Herberstein had alluded to the "Holy Mountains" area as early as 1526. It is likely that the first monks settled the area in the 15th century. At the time it was a minor monastic establishment in the Wild Fields regularly ravaged by the Crimean Tatars.

In 1787, Catherine II had it shut down. The monastery's lands were secularized and donated to Prince Grigory Potemkin, the Viceroy of New Russia. One of his heirs, Alexandr Mikhailovich Potemkin, and his wife Tatiana, née Princess Galitzine, financed the monastery's restoration, starting in 1844.

=== Soviet closure ===
Before the October Revolution, the Sviatohirsk Monastery owned a worker's shop, windmills, various kinds of repair shops, and trading buildings. The lavra's main Dormition Cathedral was designed by Alexey Gornostaev, who included a traditional Byzantine tower. From 1917 onward, the Bolsheviks plundered and desecrated the monastery on numerous occasions, beating and murdering many monks and in 1922, they shut the monastery down completely, setting up a Sanatorium for the Donbas workers on the grounds.

Before World War I, the monastery was inhabited by approximately 600 monks. During the 1930s, some of the churches were demolished by the Soviets, along with other numerous religious sites throughout the Soviet Union.

=== Restoration in independent Ukraine ===
After the fall of the Soviet Union and the regaining of Ukrainian independence in 1991, the monastery was restored a year later. In 2004, the monastery was officially granted the status of a Ukrainian Orthodox Church lavra. Today, the monastery community consists of more than 100 monks, and is increasing each year.

On October 25, 2005, the National Bank of Ukraine issued its 10-hryvnia commemorative coin depicting the Sviatohirsk Lavra.

=== 2022 Russian shelling ===
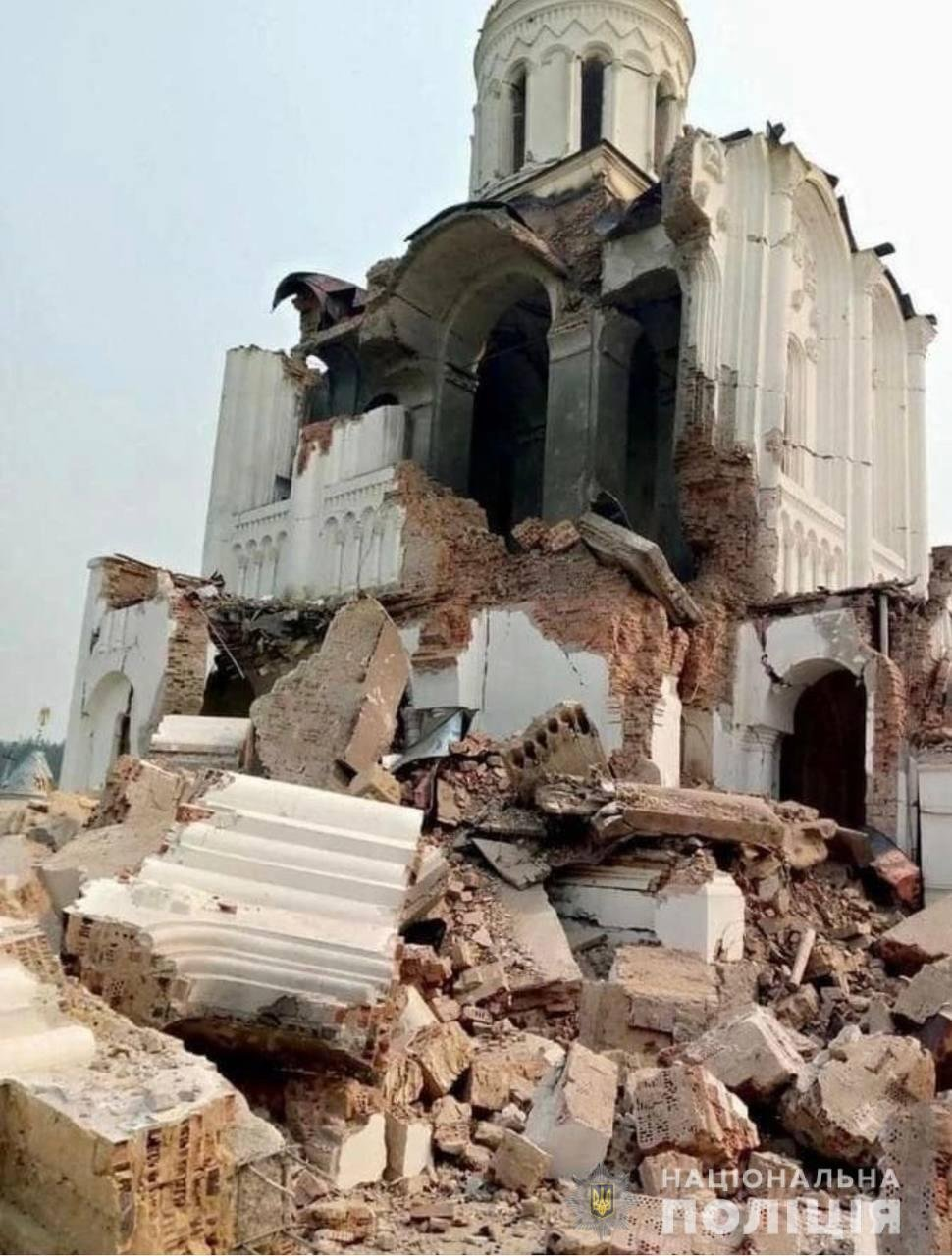
St. George's Skete of the Lavra after shelling, May 2022

During the Russian invasion of Ukraine, the monastery provided shelter to civilian refugees. On 12 March 2022, it was damaged by a Russian airstrike on the nearby bridge across the Donets, at which time about 520 refugees were present in the monastery. The blast from the explosion damaged windows and doors of the monastery buildings, and several people were injured from the glass shards of the shattered windows. On 4 May, repeated shelling wounded 7 people. Later in May, Russian shelling destroyed Our Lady of the Joy of All Who Sorrow Skete, St. George's Skete, damaged St. John of Shanghai Skete and the Church of Holy Martyrs of the Lavra. On 30 May, shelling resulted in the death of two monks and of a nun, the injury of three monks, and damage to the property. On June 4, a large-scale fire broke out in the grounds of the Holy Dormition Lavra, and the flames engulfed the main shrine of the monastery; the Ukrainians blamed Russian forces for starting the fire. It was reported that the fire had destroyed the Skete of All Saints.

== Gallery ==
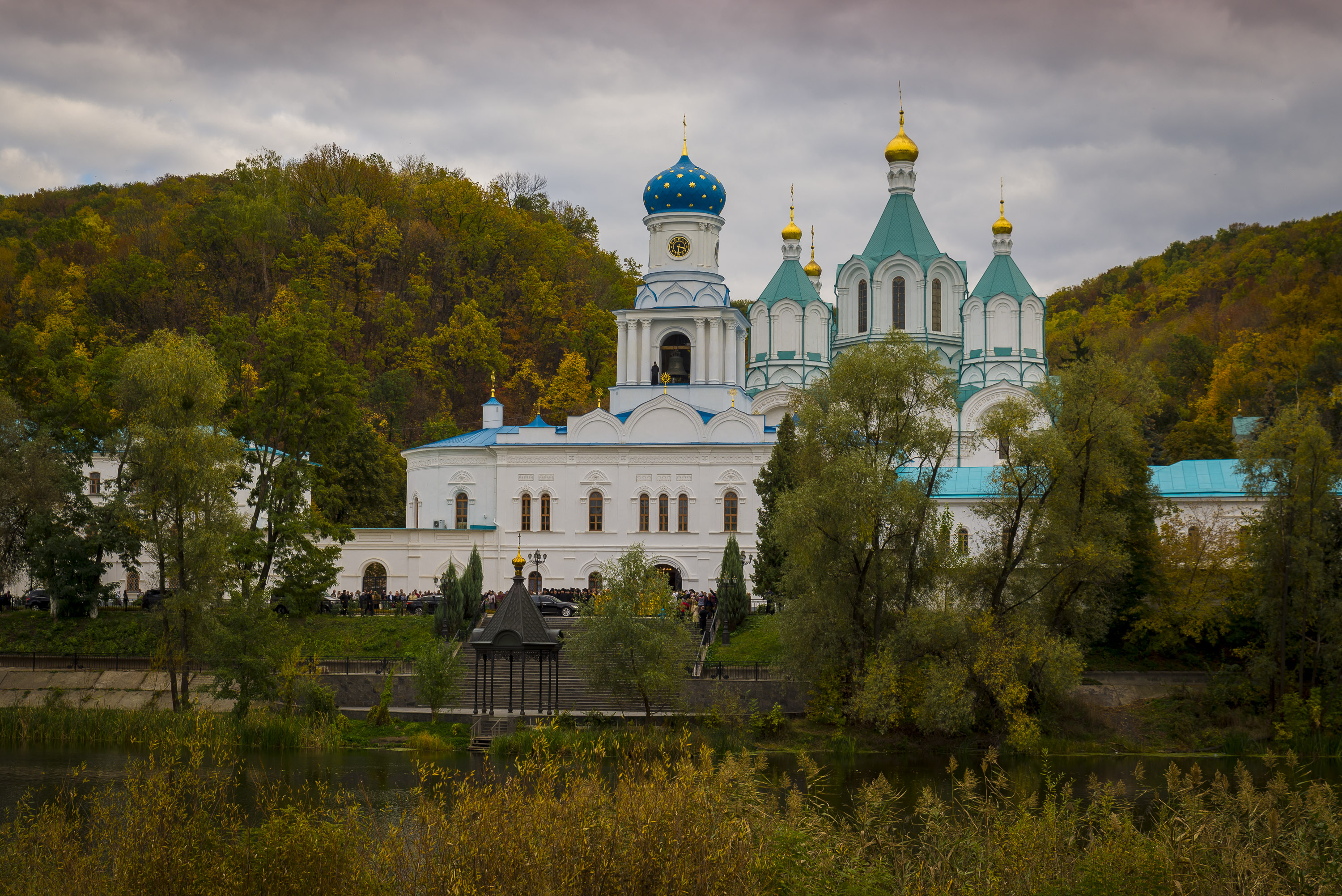
The Sviato-Pokrovska Church of the Lavra

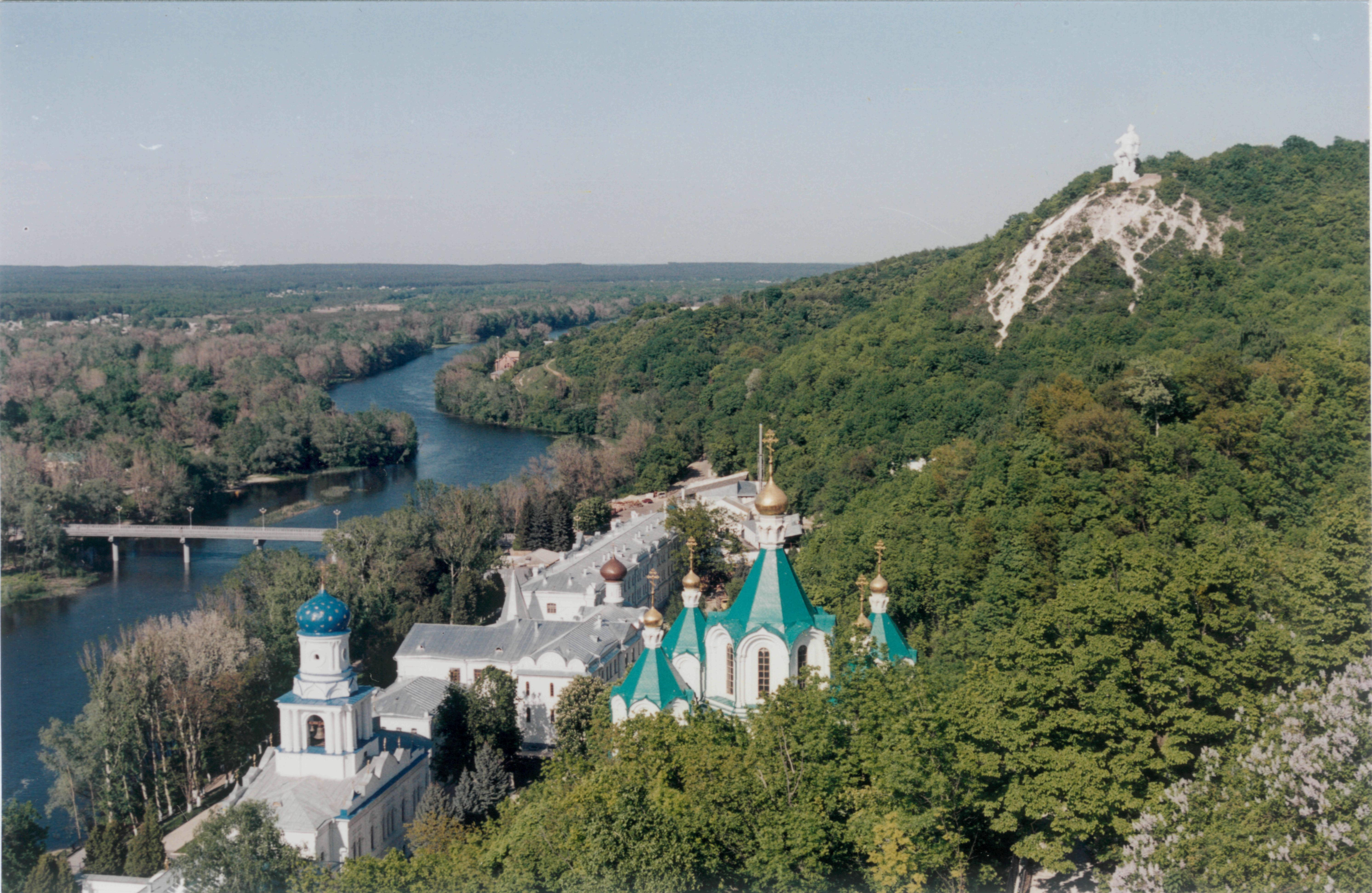
The Sviato-Pokrovska Church from the right side

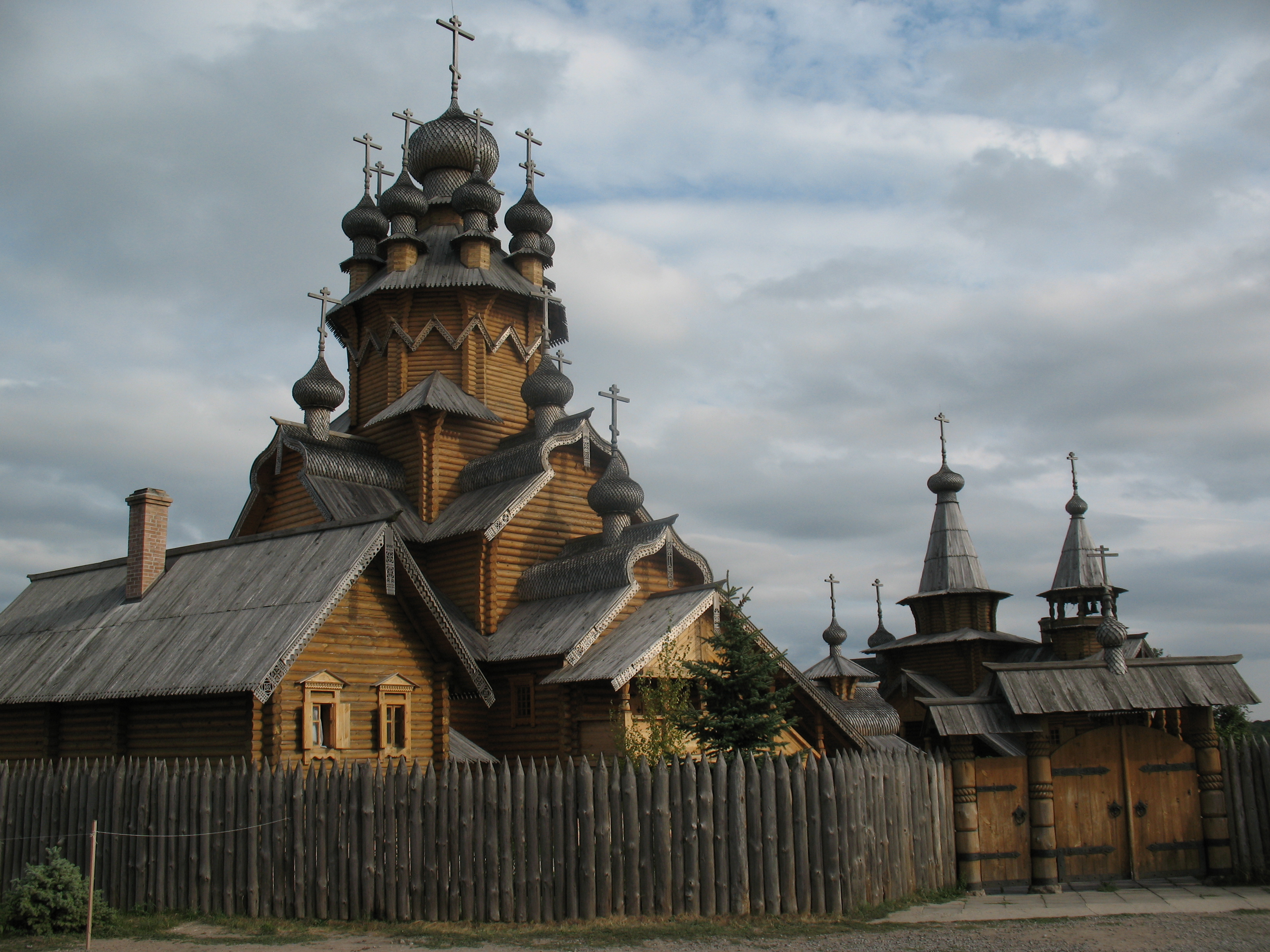
The Skete of All Saints, an all-wood church within the Lavra, in 2010.

== See also ==
- Persecution of Christians in the Soviet Union
- USSR anti-religious campaign (1917–1921)
- USSR anti-religious campaign (1921–1928)
- USSR anti-religious campaign (1928–1941)
- USSR anti-religious campaign (1958–1964)
- USSR anti-religious campaign (1970s–1990)
