= Village (Ukraine) =

Type of populated place in Ukraine

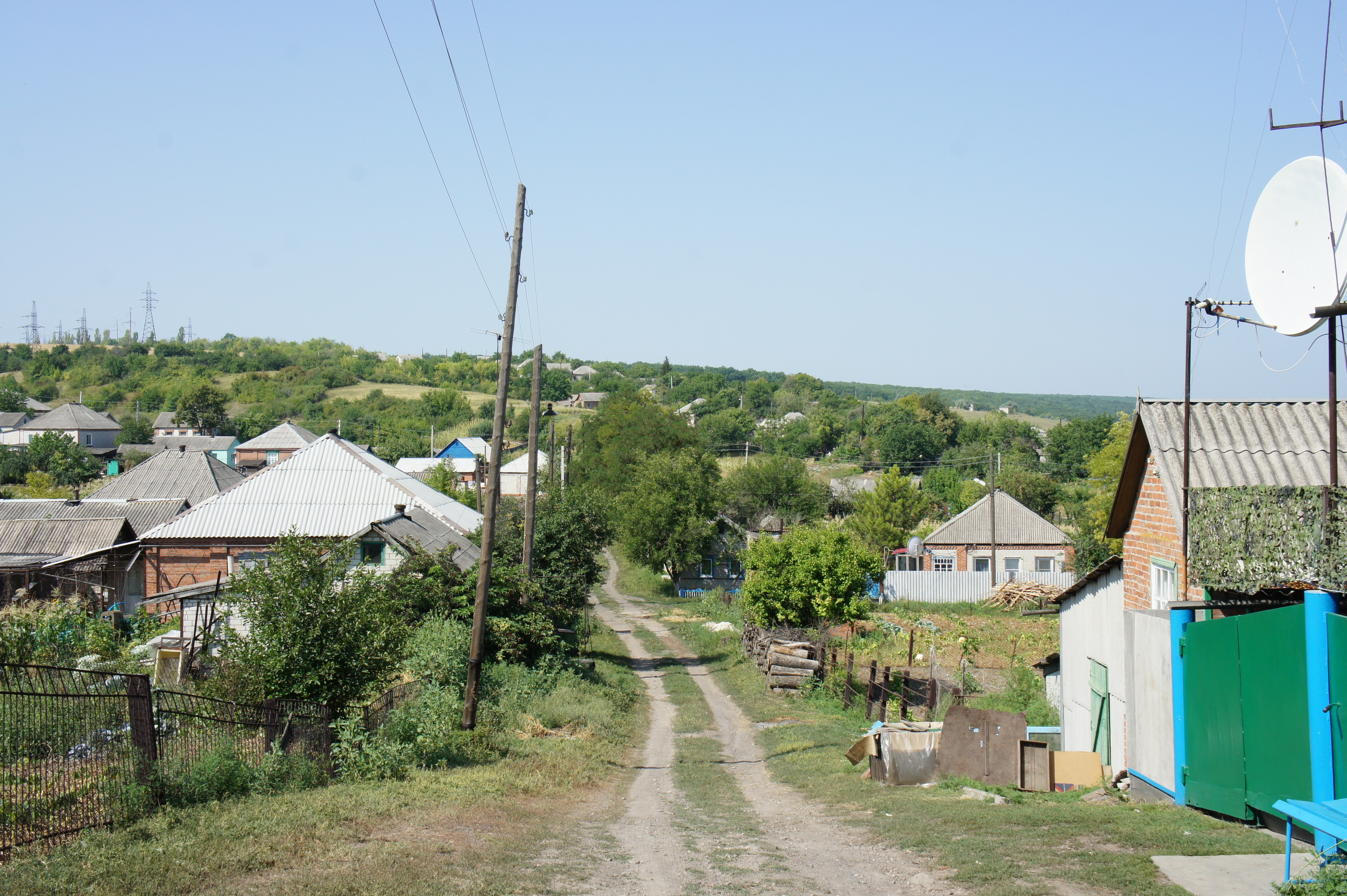
Maiaky, a village in Donetsk Oblast, Ukraine

In Ukraine, a village (Ukrainian: село, romanized: selo, IPA: [seˈlɔ]) is considered the lowest administrative unit. Villages are under the jurisdiction of a hromada administration.

== Description ==
There is another smaller type of rural settlement which is designated in Ukrainian as a selyshche (селище). This type of community is often referred to in English as a "settlement". In the new law about populated places in Ukraine the term "selyshche", has a specific meaning. In the past the word "selyshche" was more ambiguous and there were distinction between rural selyshche and selyshche miskoho typu (urban-type settlement), abbreviated smt in Ukrainian. There we also dacha, fisherman, etc. selyshches

The khutir (хутір) and stanytsia (станиця) are not part of the administrative division any longer, primarily due to collectivization. Khutirs were very small rural localities consisting of just few housing units and were sort of individual farms. They became really popular during the Stolypin reform in the early 20th century. During the collectivization, however, residents of such settlements were usually declared to be kulaks and had all their property confiscated and distributed to others (nationalized) without any compensation. The stanitsa likewise has not survived as an administrative term. The stanitsa was a type of a collective community that could include one or more settlements such as villages, khutirs, and others. Today, stanitsa-type formations have only survived in Kuban (Russian Federation) where Ukrainians were resettled during the time of the Russian Empire.

According to the 2001 Ukrainian census, there were many thousands of villages across Ukraine. Currently, villages are one of the smallest and most basic type of populated place in Ukraine, with the designation reserved by the Verkhovna Rada, the country's parliament, for settlements with populations of less than 5,000 people.

== See also ==
- Populated places in Ukraine
