= Donets =

River in Ukraine and Russia

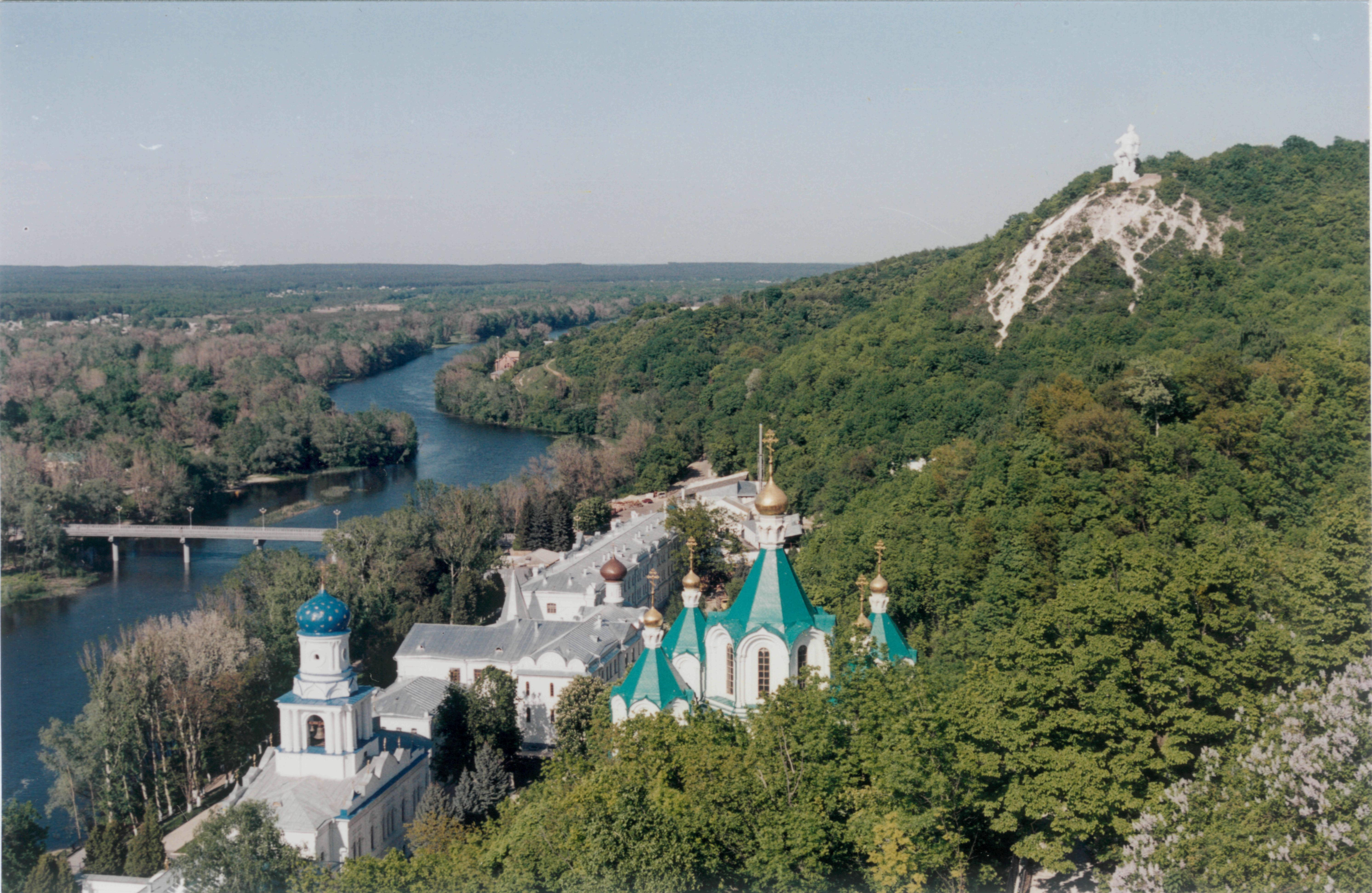
- View of the Donets and Sviatohirsk Lavra, the Holy Mountains.

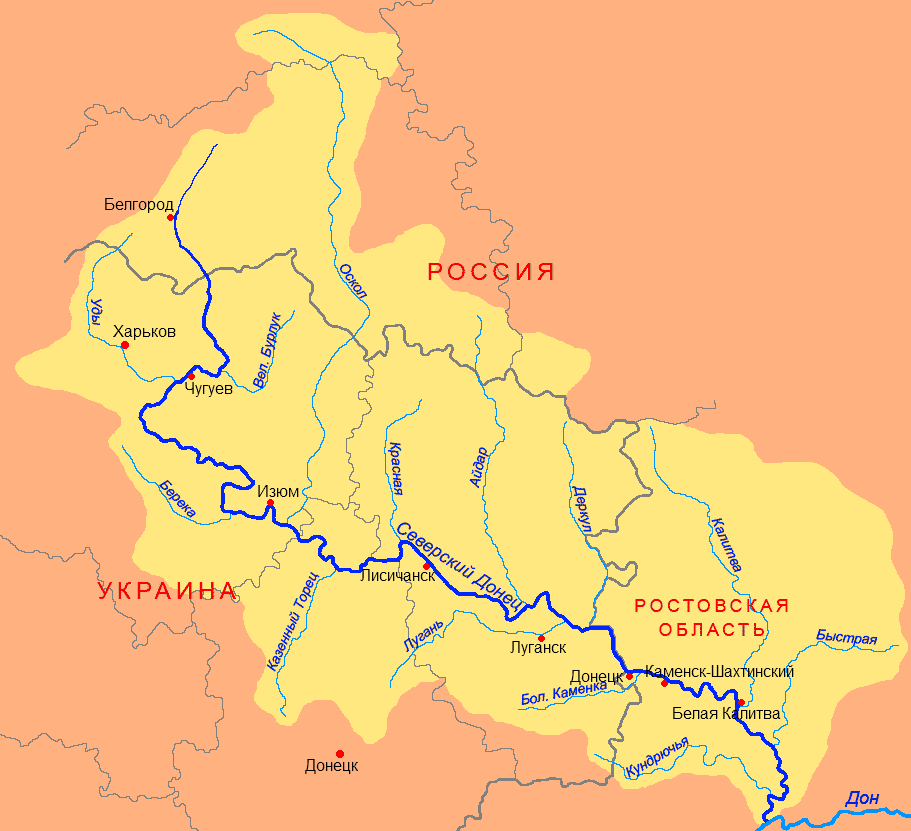
- Map of the Donets basin

Location
- Country: Russia, Ukraine
- Cities: Belgorod, Lysychansk, Sievierodonetsk

Physical characteristics
- Source
  - location: Prokhorovsky District, Belgorod Oblast, Russia
  - coordinates: 50°57′52″N 36°54′9″E
  - elevation: 200 m (660 ft)
- Mouth: Don
  - location: Rostov Oblast, Russia
  - coordinates: 47°36′1″N 40°53′48″E
  - elevation: 5.5 m (18 ft)
- Length: 1,053 km (654 mi)
- Basin size: 98,900 km^{2} (38,200 sq mi)
- Discharge
  - average: 159 m^{3}/s (5,600 cu ft/s)

Basin features
- Progression: Don→ Sea of Azov

The Seversky Donets (Russian: Северский Донец) or Siverskyi Donets (Ukrainian: Сіверський Донець), usually simply called the Donets (Russian: Донец, lit. 'Don + - ets, suffix'), is a river on the south of the East European Plain. It originates in the Central Russian Upland, north of Belgorod, flows south-east through Ukraine (Kharkiv, Donetsk and Luhansk Oblasts) and then again through Russia (Rostov Oblast) to join the river Don, about 100 km (62 mi) from the Sea of Azov. The Donets is the fourth-longest river in Ukraine, and the largest in eastern Ukraine, where it is an important source of fresh water. It gives its name to the Donets Basin, known commonly as the Donbas, an important coal-mining and industrial region in Ukraine.

== Etymology ==
The names Don and its diminutive Donets are derived from Iranic, Sarmatian Dānu "the river". Scytho-Sarmatians inhabited the areas to the north of the Black Sea from 1100 BC into the early medieval times.

In the 2nd century CE Ptolemy knew the river Don, into which the Donets flows, as Tanais, and Western Europeans recognized that the Don had a significant tributary which they called either the small Tanais or Donetz. The Slavic name of Seversky Donets derived from the fact that the river originates from the land of Severians. As the Italian-Polish chronicler Alexander Guagnini (1538–1614) wrote: "There is also another, small Tanais, which originates in the Seversky Principality (for this reason it is called Donets Seversky) and flows into the large Tanais above Azov".

== Geography and hydrology ==
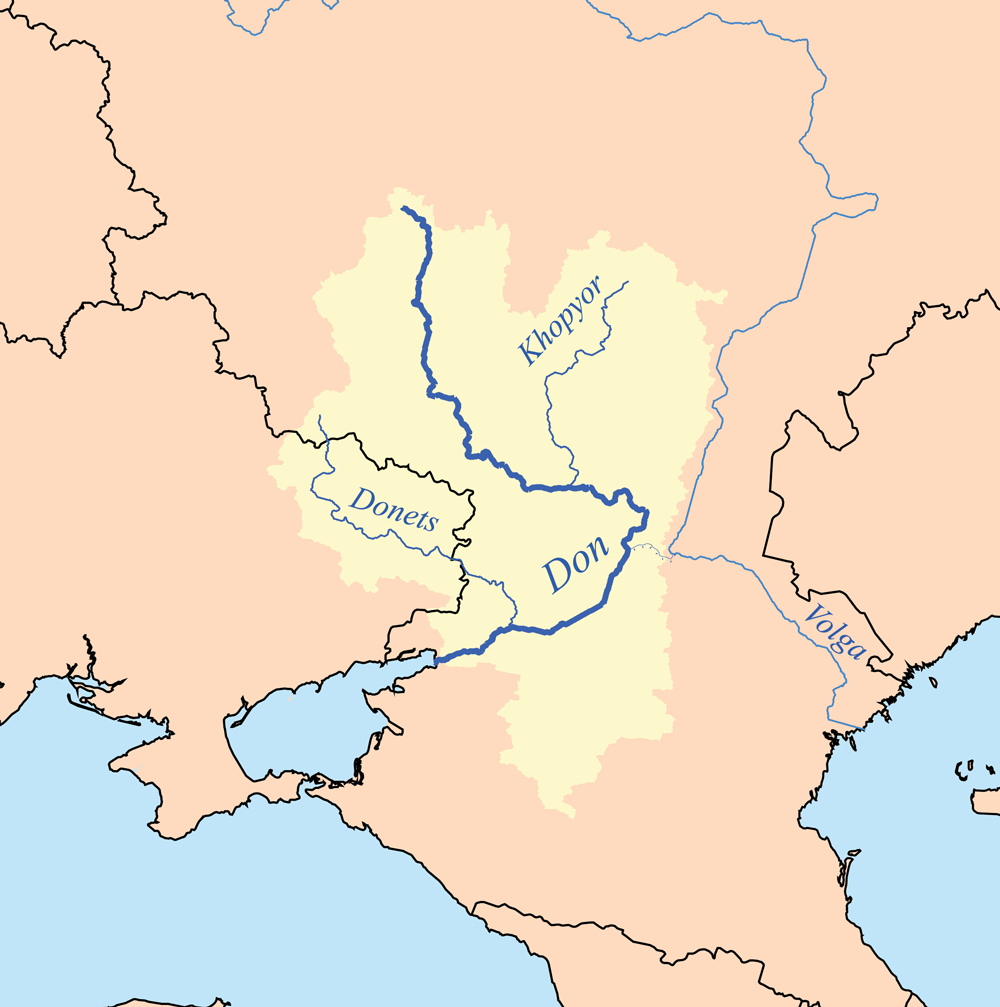
Seversky Donets and Don rivers

The Donets is the largest river in eastern Ukraine and the largest tributary of the Don. Its total length is 1,053 km (654 mi) and the basin area is 98,900 km^{2} (38,200 sq mi). Most of the river's length 950 km (590 mi) stretches across Ukraine. The average annual flow is 25 m^{3}/s (880 cu ft/s) near the source and 200 m^{3}/s (7,100 cu ft/s) at the confluence to the Don.

The Donets originates on the Central Russian Upland, near Podolkhi village, Prokhorovka area, north of Belgorod, at an elevation of 200 m (660 ft) above sea level. Its basin contains over 3000 rivers, of which 425 are longer than 10 km (6.2 mi) and 11 are longer than 100 km (62 mi); 1011 of those rivers directly flow into the Donets. These rivers are mostly fed by melting snow, and thus the water supply is uneven during the year. The spring flood lasts about two months, from February to April – during this period the water level rises by 3 to 8 m (9.8 to 26.2 ft). Excessive flooding is rare due to numerous artificial water reservoirs constructed along the river.

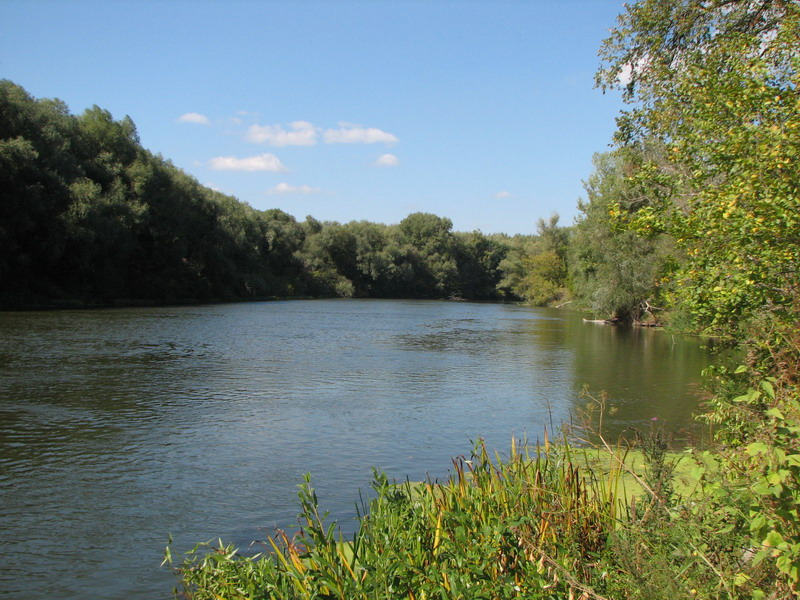
Near Shypylivka

The width of the river mostly ranges between 30 and 70 m (98 and 230 ft), sometimes reaching 100–200 m (330–660 ft) and even 4 km (2.5 mi) in the reservoir area. The river bottom is sandy and uneven, with the depth varying between 0.3 and 10 m (1 ft 0 in and 32 ft 10 in) and the average value of 2.5 m (8 ft 2 in). The river freezes from around mid-December until late March and is covered by 20–50 cm (7.9–19.7 in) thick ice. It flows into the Don 218 km (135 mi) from the latter's mouth, at an elevation of 5.5 m (18 ft) above sea level; thus the fall of the river is 195 m (640 ft) with the average gradient of 0.18 m/km.

Tributaries and reservoirs

- Right bank: Babka, Udy, Mozh, Bereka, Kazennyi Torets, Bakhmutka, Luhan, Luhanchyk, Great Kamianka, Kundryuchya
- Left bank: Nezhegol, Vovcha, Khotimlia, Velykyi Burluk, Hnylytsia, Balakliika, Iziumets, Oskil, Netryus, Zherebets', Krasna, Borova, Aidar, Derkul, Glubokaya, Kalitva, Bystraya
- Water reservoirs: Belgorod water reservoir, Pechenizke water reservoir

== Current ==
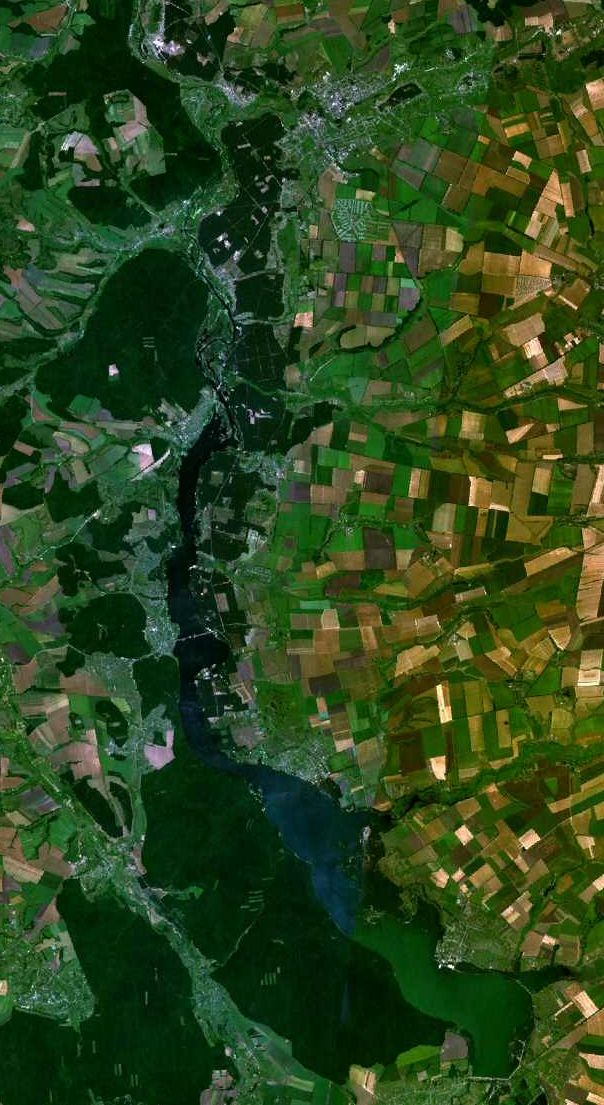
Satellite view of the Pechenizke Reservoir

The flow is slow, between 0.15 m/s (0.49 ft/s) at Chuhuiv and 1.41 m/s (4.6 ft/s) near Lysychansk. The river valley is wide: from 8–10 km (5.0–6.2 mi) in the upper part and up to 20–26 km (12–16 mi) downstream, and is asymmetrical. The right bank is usually high, sometimes with chalk cliffs, and is dissected by gullies. The left bank is more flat, contains numerous swamps, lakes and oxbow lakes, the largest of which is lake Lyman. The river is meandering, especially above the Oskil tributary.

Upstream, above Belgorod, the river contains several dams and small reservoirs. Downstream, below the confluence with the Wolf River (Volchiya River), there is the Pechenizke Reservoir (volume 86 km^{3}), which supplies water to the city of Kharkiv. Below the Pechenizke Reservoir, the Donets is fed by the Udy and by its largest tributary, the Oskil. There the valley widens and its floodplain creates numerous oxbow lakes. Within Ukraine, the river flows between the Cisdesna plateau and the Donets lowland. In its middle, the river is partly fed by the Dnieper waters, which are brought though the Dnieper–Donbas–Seversky Donets channels which provide water to the coal industry of the Donets Basin (usually called the Donbas). Near the Russian city of Donetsk (Rostov oblast), the river crosses the Donets Ridge and flows in a narrow valley with steep and rocky slopes. In the lower part of the Donets lowland, the flow is interrupted by sluices and is slow. At the delta, it splits into three distributaries.

== Navigation ==
At present, the Donets is navigable up to the city of Donetsk (Rostov Oblast), 222 km from the mouth. Navigation on the last section is supported by six dams, built from 1911 to 1914. Each consists of a 100–150-meter (330–490 ft) long concrete dam and a single-chamber sluice, 100 m (330 ft) long, 17 m (56 ft) wide and 2.5 m (8 ft 2 in) deep. At the end of the 19th – beginning of the 20th centuries, a number of attempts were made to revive shipping, in particular, for the sake of the possibility of water transportation of minerals in the Donbass. One of the enthusiasts of the project was D. I. Mendeleev, who wrote about the need to “arrange the Donets […] for our Russian needs […] because the Donets, due to the importance of the interests involved in it, is most necessary”. The developer of the project was the Russian hydraulic engineer Nestor Platonovich Puzyrevsky, known for his contribution to the Volga-Don Canal project. In 1903–1904, he conducted a detailed study of the channel of the Seversky Donets and proposed a project to restore the navigation of the Seversky Donets to the city of Belgorod, which involves the construction of a large number of locks were interrupted by World War I, Russian Civil War and lack of funds. The design of the dams and their old age slowed the navigation of the river, which is currently rather limited.

Major features on the Donets (from source to mouth)
Country	Oblast	Dist. from the mouth, km	Dist. from the source, km	Name	Type	Note
Russia	Belgorod	1053	0		Source	Near Podolkhi village, Prokhorovka area
Russia	Belgorod	990	63	Belgorod	City	
Russia	Belgorod	990	63	Belgorod Reservoir		
Ukraine	Kharkiv	940	113	Pechenizke Reservoir		
Ukraine	Kharkiv	874	179	Pechenihy	Urban-type settlement	Annual consumption of 24.5 m^{3}/s
Ukraine	Kharkiv	837	216	Chuhuiv	City	Annual consumption of 20.5 m^{3}/s
Ukraine	Kharkiv	634	419	Bereka River and Dnieper – Donbas channel	Right tributary	Length 102 km; 2,680 km^{2} basin
Ukraine	Kharkiv	600	453	Izium	City	Annual consumption 52 m^{3}/s
Ukraine	Kharkiv	580	473	Oskil	Left tributary	Length 436 km; 14,680 km^{2} basin
Ukraine	Donetsk	518	535	Raihorodok	Urban-type settlement	Start of Donets-Donbas channel
Ukraine	Donetsk	516	537	Kazennyi Torets	Tributary	Length 129 km; 5410 km^{2} basin
Ukraine	Luhansk	482	571	Rubizhne	City	
Ukraine	Luhansk	432	621	Lysychansk	City	Annual consumption 106 m^{3}/s
Ukraine	Luhansk	430	623	Sievierodonetsk	City	
Ukraine	Luhansk	306	747	Luhansk	City	
Russia	Rostov	222	831	Donetsk, Russia	City	Start of the ship navigation zone
Russia	Rostov	197	856	Kamensk-Shakhtinsky	City	Annual consumption 159 m^{3}/s
Russia	Rostov	0	1053		Mouth	218 km from the confluence of the Don to Azov Sea

== History ==
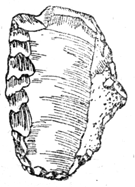
Drawing of a Stone Age tool found near the village of Krasny Yar, Luhansk Oblast.

=== Pre-industrial era ===
The river played a crucial role for its ancient settlers as a source of water and food, means of transportation and trade route. The first archaeological evidence of settlers relates to Cheulean and Acheulean periods of Lower Paleolithic through stone tools (axes) found on the river banks near Izium city of Kharkiv Oblast and in Luhansk Oblast. Over the ages, the river banks were populated by tribals of various cultures, including Mousterian, Yamna, Catacomb, Scythian, Alan, Khazar and later Slavic cultures. Many of the related tribals had nomadic lifestyle characteristic of Kipchak people, Golden Horde and later of Cossacks. The river flows through the historic lands of Sloboda Ukraine as well as the lands of Don River Host. The many Cossacks became later assimilated into the strengthening Russian Empire, which had rebuilt and reinforced the fortress of Belgorod and cities of Kyiv, Izium, Luhansk, Chuhuiv and others in order keep defensive lines against the raids of nomads from the south-east. Later, the protective role of the river basin gave way to economic needs. In the 18th–19th centuries, the river was extensively used for watermills, which numbered by hundreds by the end of the 18th century, and the mill dams interrupted navigation on the river.

=== Industrial era ===
Industrialization in the 20th century shifted interests to mineral exploitation in Donbas, with water-hungry plants concentrated mostly in Kyiv, Luhansk and Donetsk. Already by the 1930s, Kharkiv, Donetsk and Luhansk were lacking water forcing the authorities to gradually create a network of canals and reservoirs. In 1936, the Kochetok Reservoir was created and coupled to the water system of Kharkiv. By the 1950s, this measure proved insufficient, and in the 1960s, Pechenizke Reservoir was constructed in place of the Kochetok Reservoir. It has with the capacity of 400 million m^{3} and provides about 75% of water consumed by Kharkiv. To supply water to southern Donbas and Donetsk, the 130-km long Donets-Donbas channel was built around 1958 starting near Raigorodok city, and in compensation, the Dnieper-Donbas channel was created to supply water from Dnieper River to the upstream of the Donets via the Bereka River. As a result of the industrial activity, the wild nature of Donets Basin transformed into an industrial settlement. After the breakup of the USSR, most of the basin territory became part of Ukraine.

=== Russo-Ukrainian War ===
During the War in Donbas, Luhansk Oblast was roughly split along the river between the Luhansk People's Republic, which controlled most of the portion of the oblast south of the Donets, and the Ukrainian government, which controlled most of the territory north of the Donets.

In May 2022, Russian attempts to cross the Donets above Lysychansk were stopped in the operationally decisive Battle of the Siverskyi Donets.

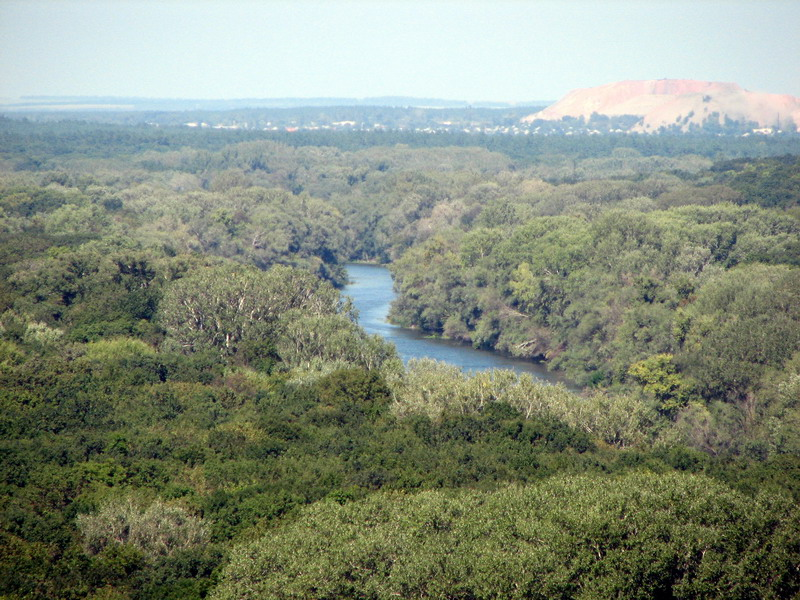
Donets in Luhansk Oblast, near Shypylivka.

== Environment ==
Being one of the largest rivers in Ukraine, the Donets is very intensively used in farming and industry. Ukraine alone uses more than 2 km^{3} (0.48 cu mi) of river waters per year, half of which is returned as polluted discharges; this consumption effectively reduces river runoff by 32 m^{3}/s (1,100 cu ft/s).

Donets suffered greatly even back in the 18th century, when old oaks were cut down along its banks. The industrial development of the 19th century reduced the groundwater levels of the basin. This resulted in shallowing of the river and slowed navigation. Until the mid-19th century, the river was rich in fish which population rapidly declined since then. The water quality is graded as level IV (polluted) to V (dirty). The main pollutants are fertilizers, petroleum, phenols, zinc, chromium and copper. In Kharkiv Oblast, water is contaminated by industrial and communal wastes of Belgorod, Izium and Shebekino cities, but the water is partially purified through the Pechenizke Reservoir. The density of plants and thus the contamination increase downstream in Donetsk and Luhansk areas, especially around Lysychansk and Sievierodonetsk, about 400 km from the mouth. Some tributaries of the Donets, such as Kozenyi Butt, Bakhmut and Lugan are so polluted that consuming fish caught there is dangerous. The purest segment of Donets is between the source and Belgorod, and between the Pechenizke Reservoir and Chuhuiv. Average water salinity is 650–750 mg/L, and it increases in winter to 1000 mg/L mostly due to industrial wastewater.

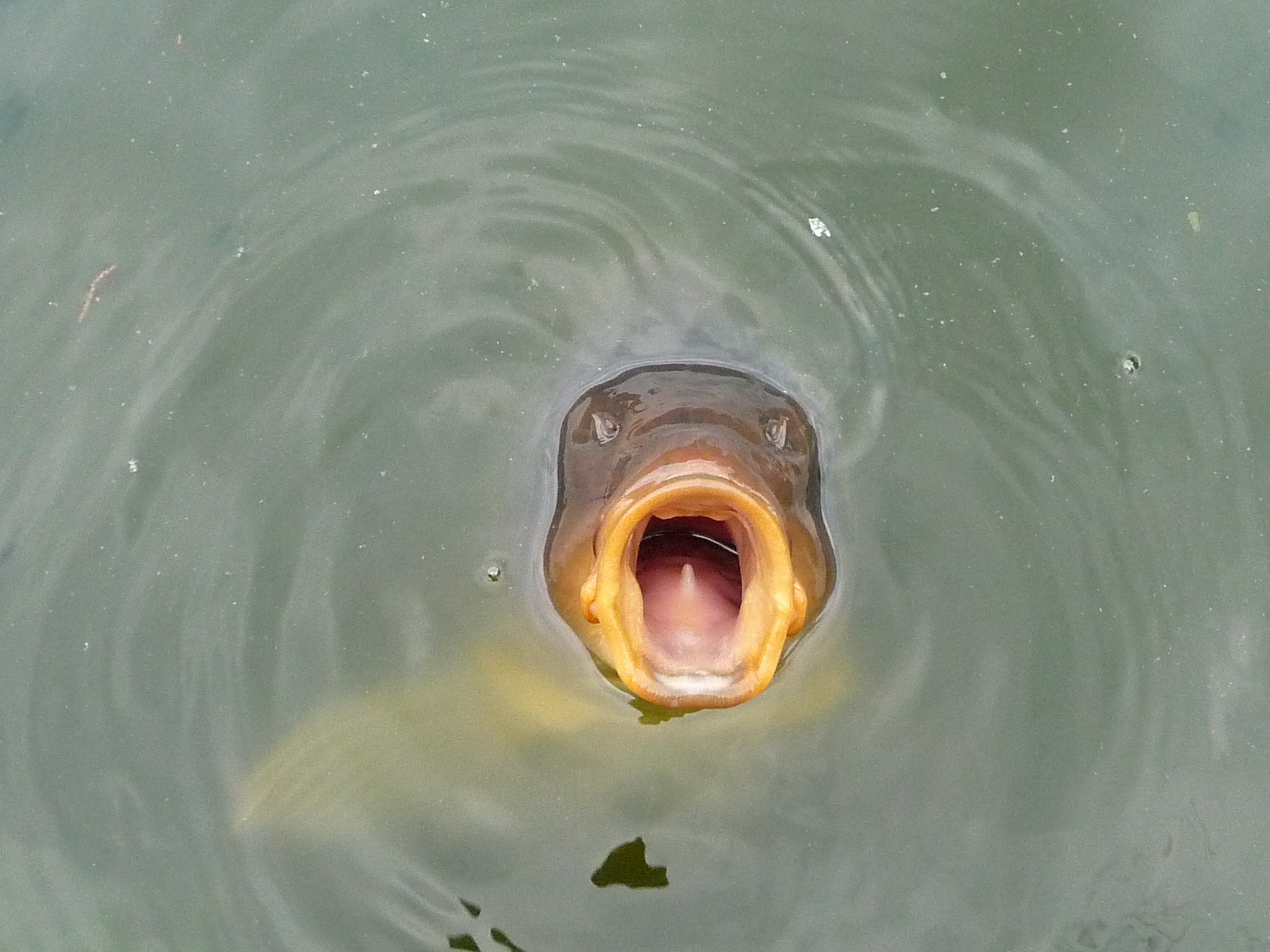
Carp

== Flora and fauna ==
=== Fish ===
The Donets hosts 44 species of fish, predominantly small fishes such as European perch, rutilus and common rudd. Medium and large species include bream, perch, catfish and pike and are becoming increasingly rare. Near Pechenizke Reservoir a large hatchery of carp has successfully operated since 1967.

=== Amphibians and reptiles ===
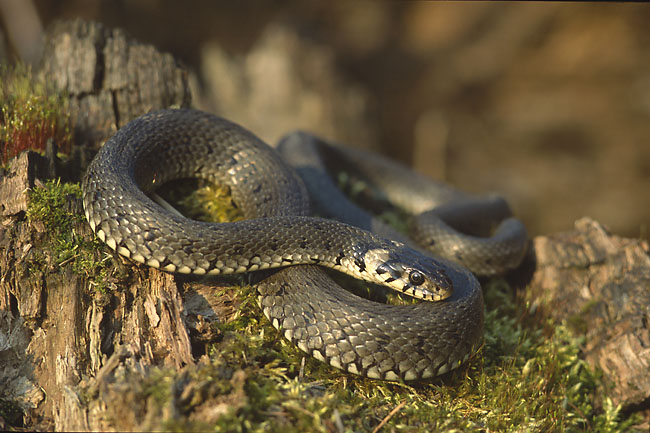
Grass snake

On the banks of the river, in the floodplain wetlands, there are abundant water frogs, toads (especially green toad), smooth and great crested newts and less common grass snake, dice snake and European pond terrapin.

=== Mammals ===
Human activities, mainly cultivation of the steppes, resulted in the disappearance of animals formerly common in the basin, such as tarpan, steppe antelope, saiga antelope, marmots and others. Back in the 1960s–1970s, especially near Oskil River, it was not unusual to meet bobak marmot, Eurasian deer, wild boar and Russian desman. Current mammals of the basin include European beaver, Dipodidae, suslik, mice, European otter, European mink, weasel and bats.

Russian desman	Marmot	European otter	Least weasel

=== Birds ===
The number of bird species of the river basin reduced sharply over the past 100–150 years. The disappeared species include steppe eagle, tirkusha, sociable lapwing, bustard, black and winged lark. Less common are geese, swans, golden eagle, white-tailed eagle, peregrine falcon, honey buzzard and osprey. The reduction is mainly caused by the destruction of forests, especially old groves along the river banks. The creation of artificial forest belts (windbreaks) in the basin in the 1960s brought insectivorous birds new to this area, such as Streptopelia, European magpie and shrikes. From the traditional bird types, still common are several species of ducks, crows, Charadriiformes, Podiceps, great reed warbler and much less common are herons and storks. Only 12 individuals of demoiselle cranes remain in the area, near Sviatohirsk city. During the migratory season, the region is visited by greylag and black geese.

Demoiselle crane	Great reed warbler	Skylark	White-tailed eagle

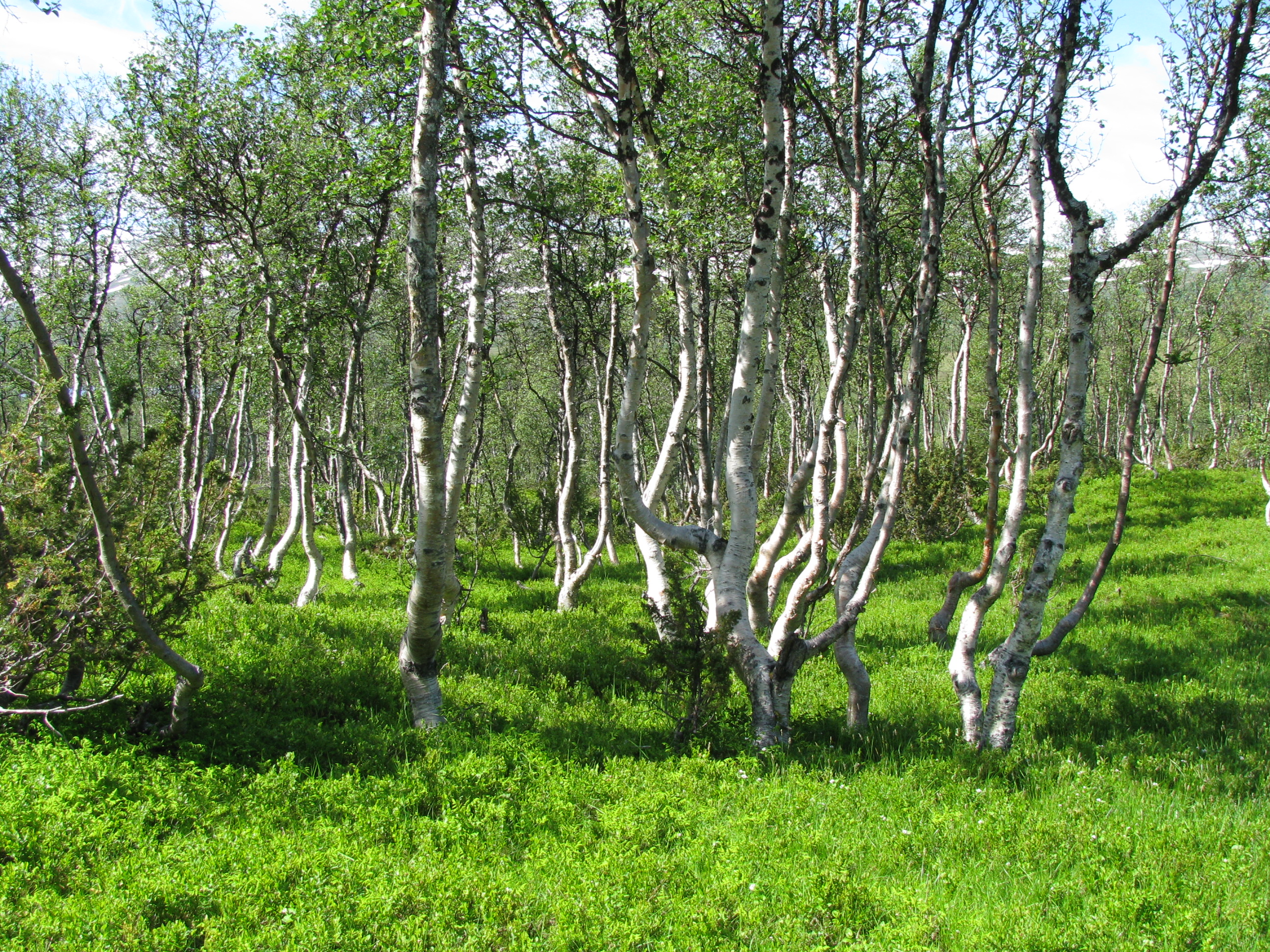
Downy birch

=== Flora ===
Banks of the river used to contain groves of trees, which were cut during the 18th–19th centuries. Some of the trees were used for shipbuilding during the Russian-Turkish wars in the time of Peter I. By the 20th century, most meadows along the river banks were converted into farmers' fields. Only a small part of the old groves remains, mainly in the Kharkiv Oblast. North of Izium, there are still broadleaf forests, and pine forests are found near Chuhuiv. Many species of wild plants survive near floodplain wetlands. These include willow, downy birch, alder and krushinnik. Along the river banks, there are cane, swamp horsetail, carex, kizlyak, swamp sabelnik and other types of grass.

== Tourism ==
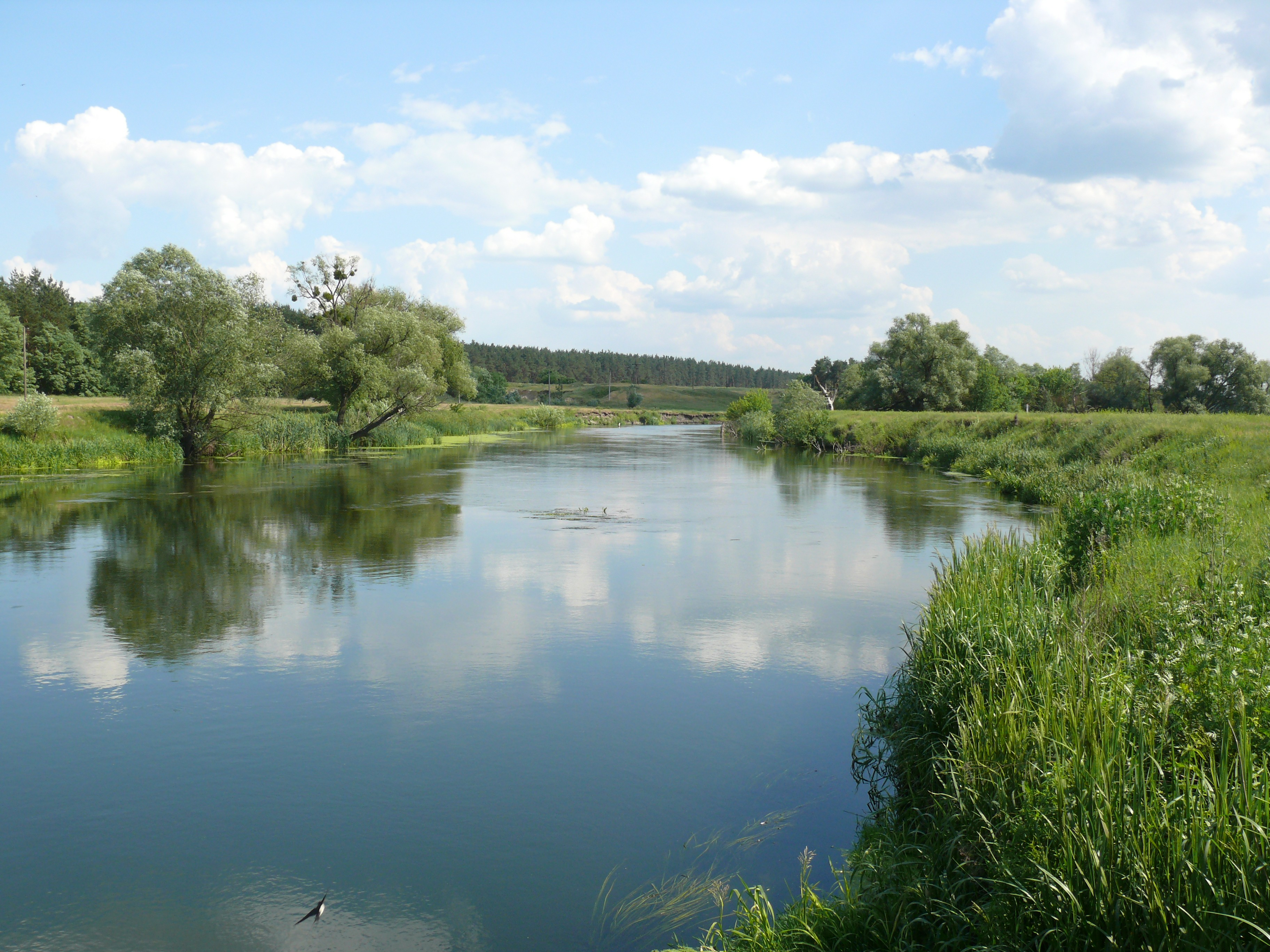
Downstream of Zmiiv.

The Donets is regarded as one of the most scenic rivers of East European Plain and contains many hiking and biking routes along its banks. Canoe rafting is rather popular, especially between Zmiiv and Sviatohirsk. Rafting is of the first (lowest) degree of difficulty. The busiest tourism months are from May to September. The most picturesque part is probably near the town of Izium, which hosts a National Park of Holy Mountains. Down to Lysychansk, the water is clean for swimming, and there are many sandy beaches on the shores. Near Pechenizke Reservoir, there are several health resorts.

== Gallery ==
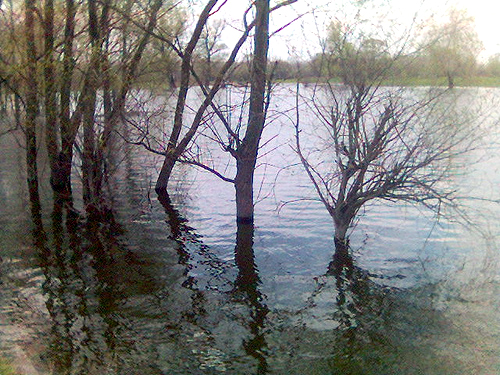
Spring flood

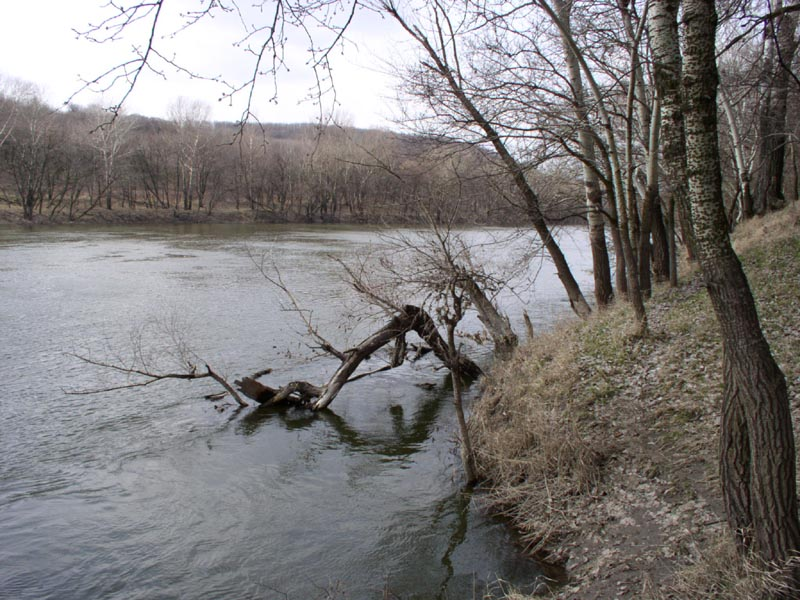
Spring

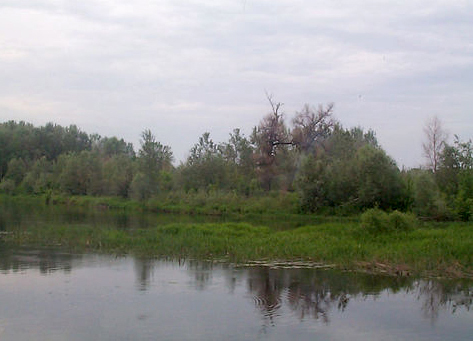
Summer

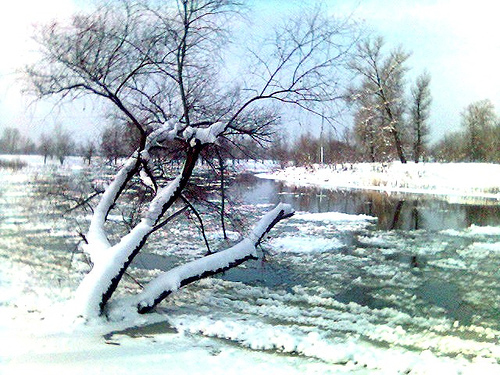
Winter

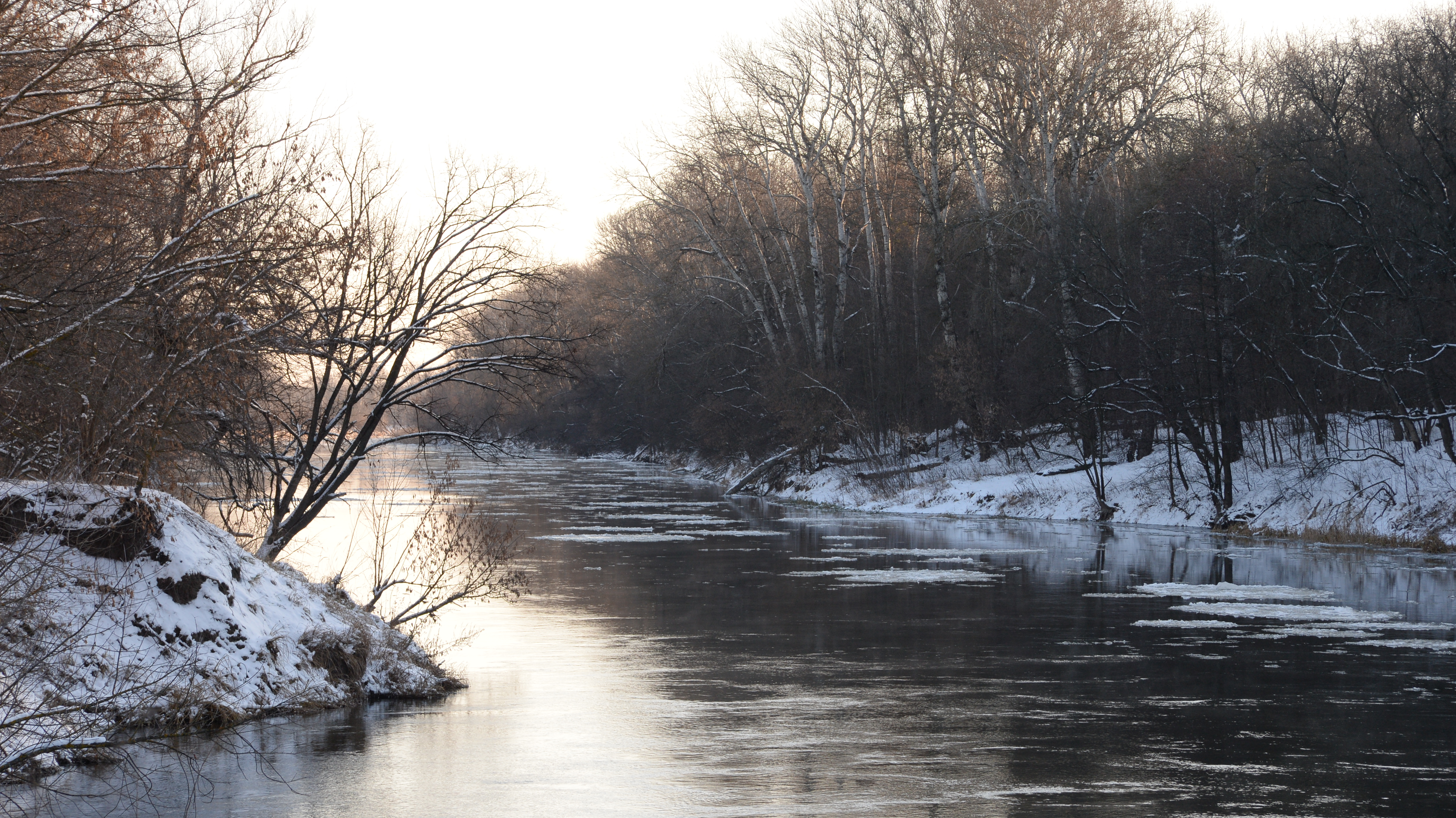
Seversky Donets River near the village of Yaremovka

== Bibliography ==
- V. A. Kimstach; Michel Meybeck; Ellysar Baroudy (1998). A water quality assessment of the former Soviet Union. Taylor & Francis. ISBN 0-419-23920-0.
