= Holy Mountains National Nature Park =

National park in Ukraine

- Ukrainian: Національний природний парк «Святі Гори»
- IUCN category II (national park)
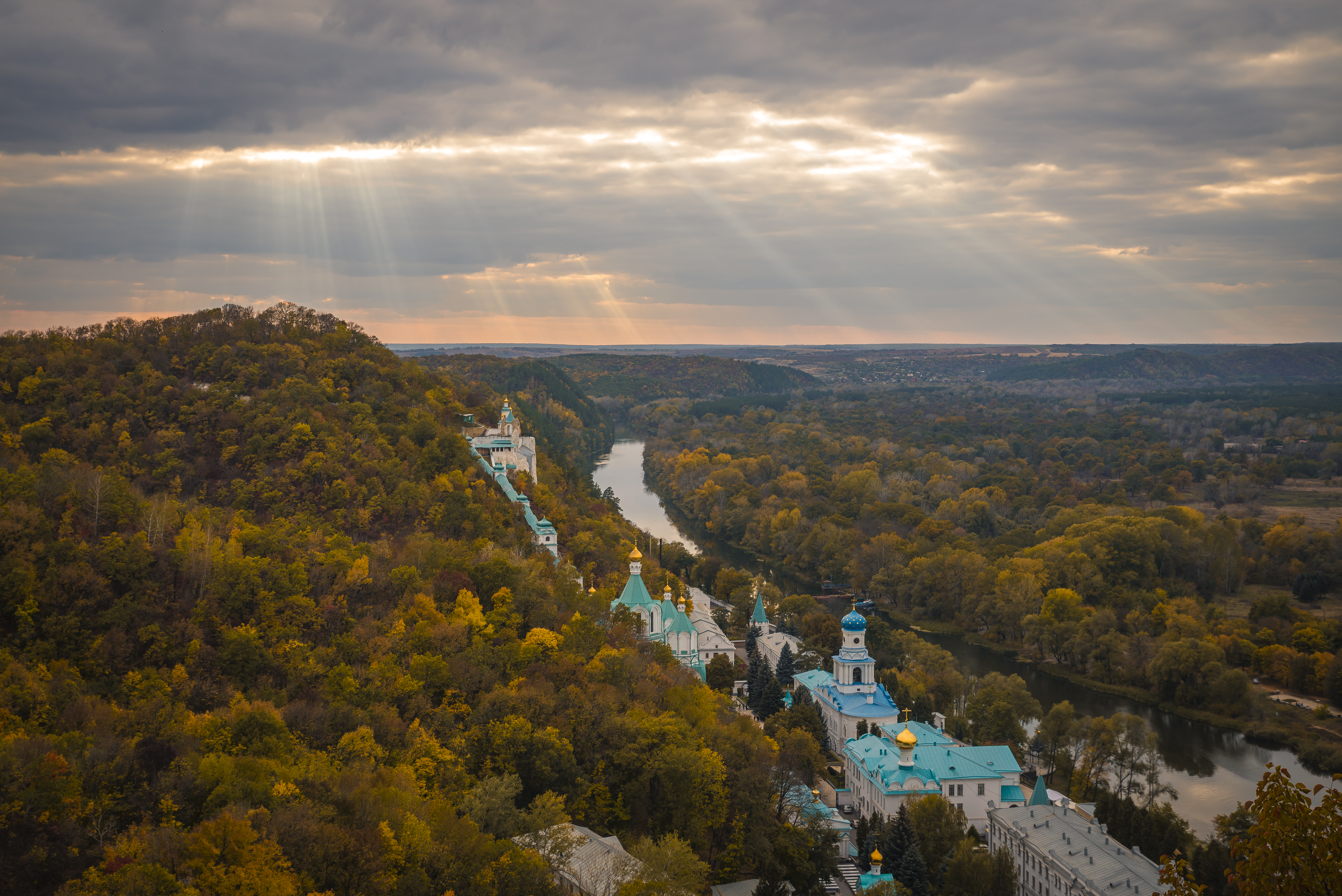
- The Holy Mountains National Nature Park and the Sviatohirsk Lavra in the foreground

- Location within Ukraine
- Location: Lyman Raion, Donetsk Oblast
- Nearest city: Sviatohirsk
- Coordinates: 48.91667°N 37.78330°E
- Area: 40,609 hectares (100,347 acres; 406 km^{2}; 157 sq mi)
- Established: 1997
- Governing body: Ministry of Ecology and Natural Resources (Ukraine)
- Website: http://npp-svyatygory.com.ua/basic.html

The Holy Mountains National Nature Park (Ukrainian: Національний природний парк «Святі Гори», romanized: Sv'ati Hory) is located along the chalk cliffs and river terraces of the Donets River in Eastern Ukraine. The national park's boundaries are a patchwork of forested areas stretching along the banks of the Donets. The Holy Mountains of Ukraine contain many archaeological, natural, historical, and recreational sites, including the Sviatohirsk Lavra monastery. The park is located in the administrative districts of Sloviansk (11,957 ha), Lyman (27,665 ha) and Bakhmut; all are in the north of Donetsk Oblast.

== Topography ==
The Donets River originates in the Russian uplands north of the park, flows southeast through Ukraine, and back into Russia. The Sviati Hori park is located in the middle stretch of the Ukrainian sector, on terrain of steppe, mountains, upland, and wetlands. The left bank of the river in the park mostly consists of flood terraces, with numerous lakes and spring-fed streams. The right bank tracts are on chalk hills that rise 120–130 meters above the river. The Donets floods an average of 2.5 meters every year, with peaks of 5.8 meters every five years.

== Climate and ecoregion ==
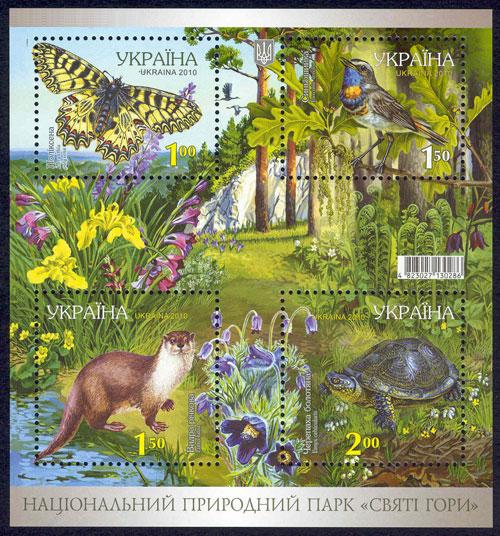
Ukrainian stamp honoring the Holy Mountains Park.

The climate of the Holy Mountains park is humid continental climate, warm summer (Köppen climate classification (Dfb)). This climate is characterized by large swings in temperature, both diurnally and seasonally, with mild summers and cold, snowy winters.

The park is in the Pontic–Caspian steppe ecoregion, a grassland that stretches from Romania in the west to the region of the southern Ural Mountains.

== Flora and fauna ==
Up to 91% of the park is forested, with another 2.5% in willow-alder bogs, and 1.5% in meadows. The park has great diversity of species of both flora and fauna, with over one-third of the species of Ukraine found within park boundaries. The deciduous forests of the left bank display 90-110 year-old stands of oak (one third of the trees), ash, lime and maple. First terraces are often sandy with stands of pine trees. While normally rare in a steppe zone, the forests of the area benefit from the mountainous relief and natural water of the area. The herbaceous layers of the park tend towards steppe species. 943 species of plants have been recorded in the park, including many relic (Cretaceous) and endemic (20 recorded) species.

The park has recorded 40 species of fish, over 200 of birds, 10 reptile, and 48 mammals. The park has a high number of predatory mammals, including fox, marten, and even wolves. The foxes tend to make their dens within park boundaries, but range into the nearby farmland.

== Public use ==
About 85% of the park is available for recreational use – hiking, camping in designated areas, and historical and ecological tours. 6.5% of the park is off-limits to the public to protect especially important or sensitive sites.

The national park is endangered by forest fires caused by the ongoing 2022 Russian invasion of Ukraine and the military operations in the area. In October 2024, a Reuters report cited Ukrainian officials as saying that of the nearly 12,000 hectares of the park which are owned by park management, roughly 80% had been damaged or destroyed by fires or ordnance.

== See also ==
- National Parks of Ukraine
