= House of the weeping nymphs =

Coordinates: 47°05′24″N 37°32′46″E

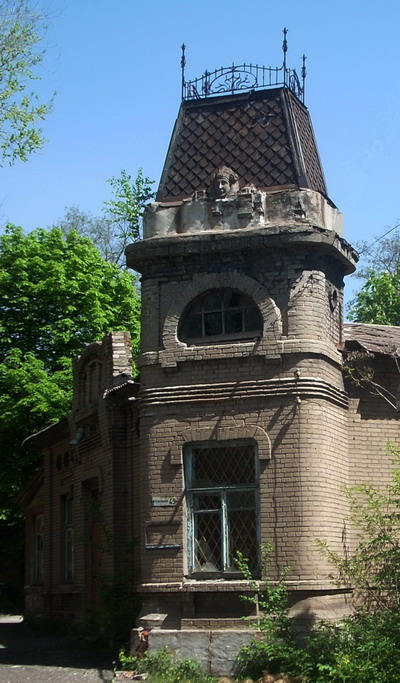
House of the Weeping Nymph

The House of the weeping nymphs is located near the city garden at 49 Semenichina Street in Mariupol, Ukraine.

== History ==
The house marks the family tragedy of the city architect Victor Nilsen who designed and built the house for his family and in memory of his beloved daughter. He dedicated this building to his daughter, who died of typhoid fever.

== Architecture ==
The architecture of the house is influenced by the Vienna Secession and Art Nouveau. The house has a high roof, splendid stucco work and patterned cornices. A tower dominates one corner and has a face of a nymph. The nymph's face is similar to the face of Nielsen's daughter, who died of typhus. When it rains, drops flow down the face like tears. It seems that the nymph is crying about Nielsen's family tragedy.
