= Monuments of national significance in Donetsk Oblast =

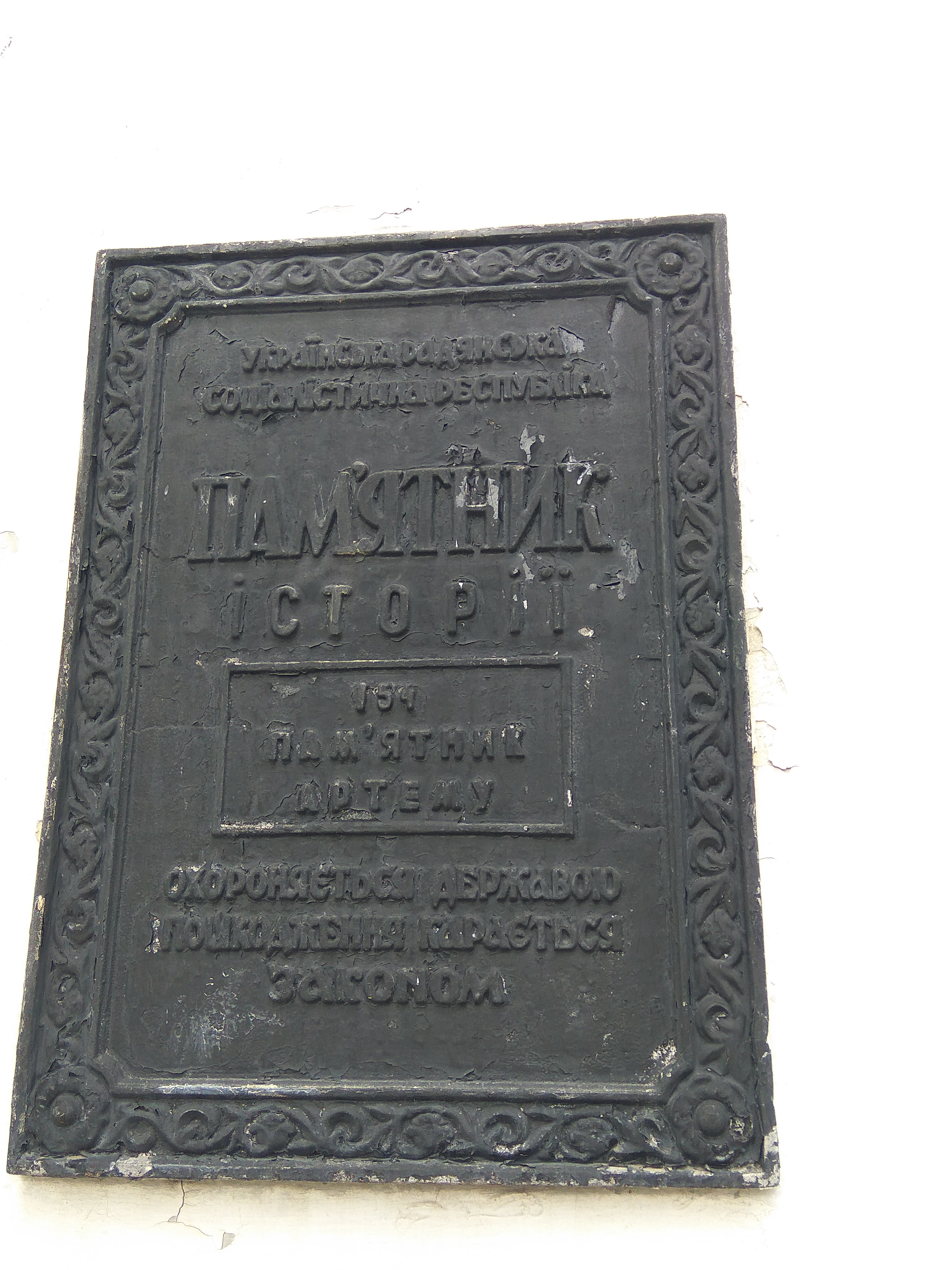
Soviet-era cultural heritage plaque of the Monument to Artyom in Sviatohirsk

The State Register of Immovable Monuments of Ukraine classifies cultural heritage monuments as either of local or national significance. (Note: 'Monuments of national significance' may also be translated as 'monuments of national importance'; Ukrainian: пам'ятки національного значення) To be classified as nationally significant, a monument must have had a substantial impact on Ukraine's culture, been associated with major historical events or individuals who shaped national culture, represented a masterpiece of creative genius, or embodied a disappeared civilisation or disappeared artistic style. Monuments of national significance are inscribed on the register by the Cabinet of Ministers, and are protected and maintained by the Ministry of Culture. All listed monuments belong to at least one of the following categories: archaeology, history, monumental art, architecture, urban planning, garden and park art, landscape, or science and technology. (Note: The categories are defined as such: Archaeological monuments are underground or underwater remains of human activity that bear testimony to the origin or development of civilisation.; Historic monuments are buildings, structures, burials, and other sites associated with important historical events or the lives and activities of prominent individuals.; Monuments of monumental art are works of fine art.; Architectural monuments are buildings and structures that retain full or partial authenticity and express characteristics of a particular culture, era, style, construction technique, or represent works of renowned architects.; Urban planning monuments are historic neighbourhoods, streets, squares, or ensembles with preserved spatial layouts and architectural integrity.; Monuments of garden and park art combine park construction with natural or anthropogenic landscapes.; Landscape monuments are natural areas possessing historical value.; Monuments of science and technology are industrial, engineering, or scientific sites that reflect the scientific and technological development of an era or discipline.)

The first attempts to establish registers of protected buildings were undertaken in 1917 and 1918 by the Ukrainian People's Republic. These efforts continued in the 1920s in Soviet Ukraine, culminating in the listing of thousands of monuments, but were halted in the 1930s with the dissolution of relevant institutions and the active destruction of cultural—particularly religious—heritage. The listing of cultural heritage monuments in the region was renewed in 1956. A list of architectural monuments was approved in 1963, followed by a separate list of artistic, historic, and archaeological monuments in 1965. Both lists remained in use after Ukraine declared independence in 1991. On 8 June 2000, the State Register of Immovable Monuments was established with the adoption of the law On the Protection of Cultural Heritage. All entries from the Soviet-era list of artistic, historic, and archaeological monuments were transferred to the new register on 14 September 2009. The transfer of monuments from the Soviet architectural register, however, has proceeded more slowly and remains incomplete as of 2026, although the process has accelerated in recent years. At the same time, a number of sites have been deprived of their protected status to comply with decommunisation and derussification laws in effect since 2015 and 2023, respectively.

Donetsk Oblast is located in eastern Ukraine and contains 27 monuments of national significance. (Note: No monuments of national significance in the oblast remain on the Soviet-era register.) It is divided into eight raions (districts), six of which—Donetsk, Horlivka, Kalmiuske, Kramatorsk, Mariupol, and Volnovakha—include 2, 1, 3, 18, 1, and 2 monuments of national significance, respectively. Bakhmut and Pokrovsk raions contain no listed national monuments. Of the total, 13 are classified as architectural monuments, 9 as archaeological, 4 as historic, 2 as monumental art, and 1 as urban planning, with 2 monuments belonging to multiple categories. The architectural monuments date from the 17th to the 20th centuries. The latest inscriptions date to March 2026. Many historic sites in the region have been damaged during the Russo-Ukrainian war ongoing since 2014, including national monuments such as the Holy Mountains Monastery, Monument to Artyom, Nemirovich-Danchenko Manor House, and Savur-Mohyla.

== Donetsk Raion ==
Monuments of national significance in Donetsk Raion
Name (Note: The names listed are unofficial translations as the register is only available in Ukrainian. The official Ukrainian names are shown below each translation, with links to the corresponding Ukrainian Wikipedia articles if applicable.)	Location	Date constructed (Note: Datings of the monuments as indicated on the register)	Date designated (Note: For monuments previously listed on a Soviet-era register, the date of transfer to the modern register is indicated.)	Type	Protection number (Note: Every monument is assigned a unique protection number, and those of national significance located in Donetsk Oblast start with the digits 05.)	Photo	Ref.
Amvrosiivka bone site, dwelling Амвросіївське костище, стоянка	Amvrosiivka	1.5 million – 10,000 BCE	14 September 2009	Archaeological	050001-Н		
Mosaics of Comprehensive School No. 5 Мозаїки загальноосвітньої школи № 5	Donetsk	1965–1966	19 October 2012	Historic, monumental art	050014-Н	More images	

== Horlivka Raion ==
Monuments of national significance in Kalmiuske Raion
Name	Location	Date constructed	Date designated	Type	Protection number	Photo	Ref.
Memorial complex "Savur-Mohyla" (Note: Savur-Mohyla was destroyed by shelling in 2014 during the war in Donbas. In 2022, under the Russian occupation, the World War II memorial was reconstructed and expanded to also commemorate fallen Russian separatists.) Меморіальний комплекс "Савур-могила"	Saurivka	1943, 1967–1976	14 September 2009	Historic	050013-Н	More images	

== Kalmiuske Raion ==
Monuments of national significance in Kalmiuske Raion
Name	Location	Date constructed	Date designated	Type	Protection number	Ref.
Kurgan cemetery Курганний могильник	Kolosky	3rd millennium BCE – 14th century CE	14 September 2009	Archaeological	050008-Н	
Kurgan cemetery "Mohyla Chorna" Курганний могильник "Могила Чорна"	Stakhivske (Note: Mentioned on the register under its pre-2024 name Petrivske)	3rd millennium BCE – 14th century CE	14 September 2009	Archaeological	050009-Н	
Grave of twice Hero of Socialist Labour P. M. Angelina Могила двічі Героя Соціалістичної праці П. М. Ангеліної	Starobesheve	1959	14 September 2009	Historic	0500010-Н	

== Kramatorsk Raion ==
Monuments of national significance in Kramatorsk Raion
Name	Location	Date constructed	Date designated	Coordinates	Type	Protection number	Photo	Ref.
Hillfort "Sviatohorske" Городище "Святогорське"	Bohorodychne	5th–9th centuries	14 September 2009	49.01915°N 37.54654°E	Archaeological	050004-Н		
Hillfort "Teplynske" Городище "Теплинське"	Bohorodychne	5th–9th centuries	14 September 2009	49.01546°N 37.53290°E	Archaeological	050005-Н		
St Nicholas Church Свято-Миколаївська церква	Druzhkivka	1902–1904	8 April 2026	48.61313°N 37.51745°E	Architectural	050015	More images	
Tsaryne (Maiaky) hillfort Царине (Маяцьке) городище	Maiaky	5th–9th centuries, 9th–13th centuries	14 September 2009	48.93569°N 37.64945°E	Archaeological	050006-Н		
Monument of Soviet partisan and state figure Artyom (F. A. Sergeyev) (Note: On 26 September 2023, the Expert Commission on the Registration of Cultural Heritage Sites supported the decision to rename the Monument to Artyom to the 'Monument created by the prominent sculptor Ivan Petrovych Kavaleridze' in accordance with the decommunisation legislation. As of 2026, the change is yet to be approved by the Ministry of Culture.) Пам'ятник радянському партійному і державному діячеві Артему (Ф. А. Сергеєву)	Sviatohirsk (Note: Mentioned on the register under both its pre-2003 name Slovianohirsk and its current name)	1927	14 September 2009	49.02944°N 37.57353°E	Monumental art	050003-Н	More images	
Holy Mountains Dormition Monastery Святогірський Успенський монастир	Sviatohirsk	17th–19th centuries	8 April 2026	49.02803°N 37.56660°E	Architectural, urban planning	050016	More images	
St Nicholas Church Миколаївська церква	Sviatohirsk	17th century	8 April 2026	49.02710°N 37.56542°E	Architectural	050016/1	More images	
Dormition Cathedral Успенський собор	Sviatohirsk	1859–1868	8 April 2026	49.02812°N 37.56759°E	Architectural	050016/2	More images	
Hotel Готель	Sviatohirsk	19th century	8 April 2026	49.02921°N 37.56902°E	Architectural	050016/3	More images	
Hegumen's house Будинок настоятеля	Sviatohirsk	1851	8 April 2026	49.02857°N 37.56698°E	Architectural	050016/4	More images	
Cells Келії	Sviatohirsk	1887	8 April 2026	49.02804°N 37.56603°E	Architectural	050016/5	More images	
Complex of cave structures Комплекс печерних споруд	Sviatohirsk	17th century	8 April 2026	49.02737°N 37.56623°E	Architectural	050016/6	More images	
Upper pilgrim pavilion Верхній павільйон прочан	Sviatohirsk	Mid-19th century	8 April 2026	49.02714°N 37.56561°E	Architectural	050016/7	More images	
Lower pilgrim pavilion Нижній павільйон прочан	Sviatohirsk	Mid-19th century	8 April 2026	49.02802°N 37.56703°E	Architectural	050016/8	More images	
Western tower Башта західна	Sviatohirsk	1850–1851	8 April 2026	49.02812°N 37.56539°E	Architectural	050016/9	More images	
Eastern tower Башта східна	Sviatohirsk	1850–1851	8 April 2026	49.02913°N 37.56859°E	Architectural	050016/10	More images	
Intercession Church and bell tower Покровська церква з дзвіницею	Sviatohirsk	1851	8 April 2026	49.02874°N 37.56741°E	Architectural	050016/11	More images	
Sydorove hillfort Сидорівське городище	Sydorove	5th–9th centuries, 9th–13th centuries	14 September 2009	48.97661°N 37.59907°E	Archaeological	050007-Н		

== Mariupol Raion ==
Monuments of national significance in Kramatorsk Raion
Name	Location	Date constructed	Date designated	Coordinates	Type	Protection number	Ref.
Kurgan "Mohyla Chorna" Курган "Могила Чорна"	Fedorivka	3rd millennium BCE – 14th century CE	14 September 2009	47.38179°N 37.69669°E	Archaeological	050012-Н	

== Volnovakha Raion ==
Monuments of national significance in Kramatorsk Raion
Name	Location	Date constructed	Date designated	Coordinates	Type	Protection number	Photo	Ref.
Kurgan cemetery Курганний могильник	Hranitne	3rd millennium BCE – 14th century CE	14 September 2009	—	Archaeological	050011-Н		
Manor house of theatre industry member, one of founders of the MKhAT V. I. Nemirovich-Danchenko (Note: The Nemirovich-Danchenko Manor House was destroyed during the Russo-Ukrainian war (2022–present).) Садиба діяча театру, одного з фундаторів МХАТ В. І. Немировича-Данченка	Neskuchne	Early 20th century, 1903	14 September 2009	47.82201°N 36.81322°E	Historic	050002-Н	More images	

== See also ==
- List of historic reserves in Ukraine
- Ukrainian architecture
