= Saints Constantine and Helen Church (Mariupol) =

Destroyed Eastern Orthodox church in Mariupol, Ukraine

- Церква Св. Костянтина і Єлени
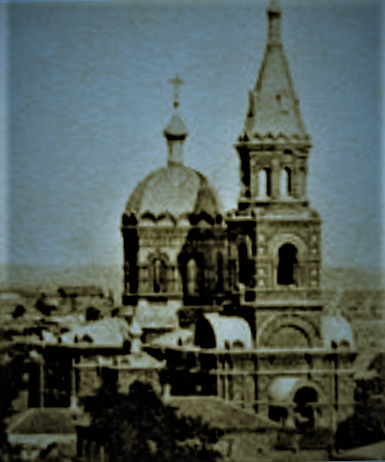
- Saints Constantine and Helen Church
- 47°05′46″N 37°32′55″E
- Country: Ukraine
- Language(s): Ukrainian, Russian
- Denomination: Ukrainian Orthodox

History
- Status: Demolished
- Consecrated: 1910

Architecture
- Demolished: 1934

The Saints Constantine and Helen Church (Ukrainian: Церква Св. Костянтина і Єлени) was an Orthodox church in Mariupol, Ukraine.

== History ==
It was an Orthodox church in honor of the Roman emperor Constantine the Great and his mother Helena. The architect Victor Nilsen designed and built this church between 1903 and 1911 The building stood until it was demolished in 1934 during the Soviet era by the Bolshevik government as part of the Atheist Five-Year Plan.

== Gallery ==
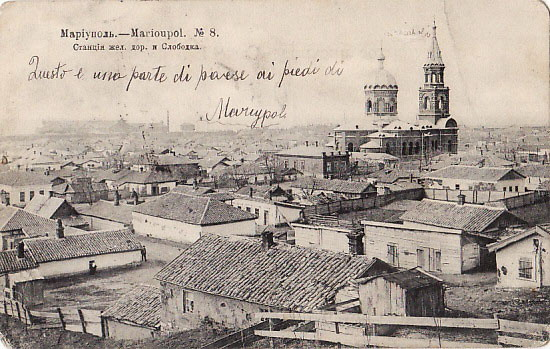

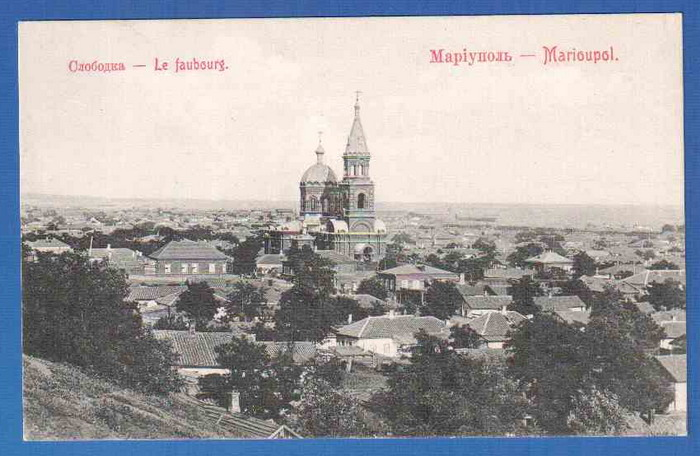
