= Old Tower, Mariupol =

Old Water Tower, Mariupol Ukraine

Old Tower
- Стара вежа
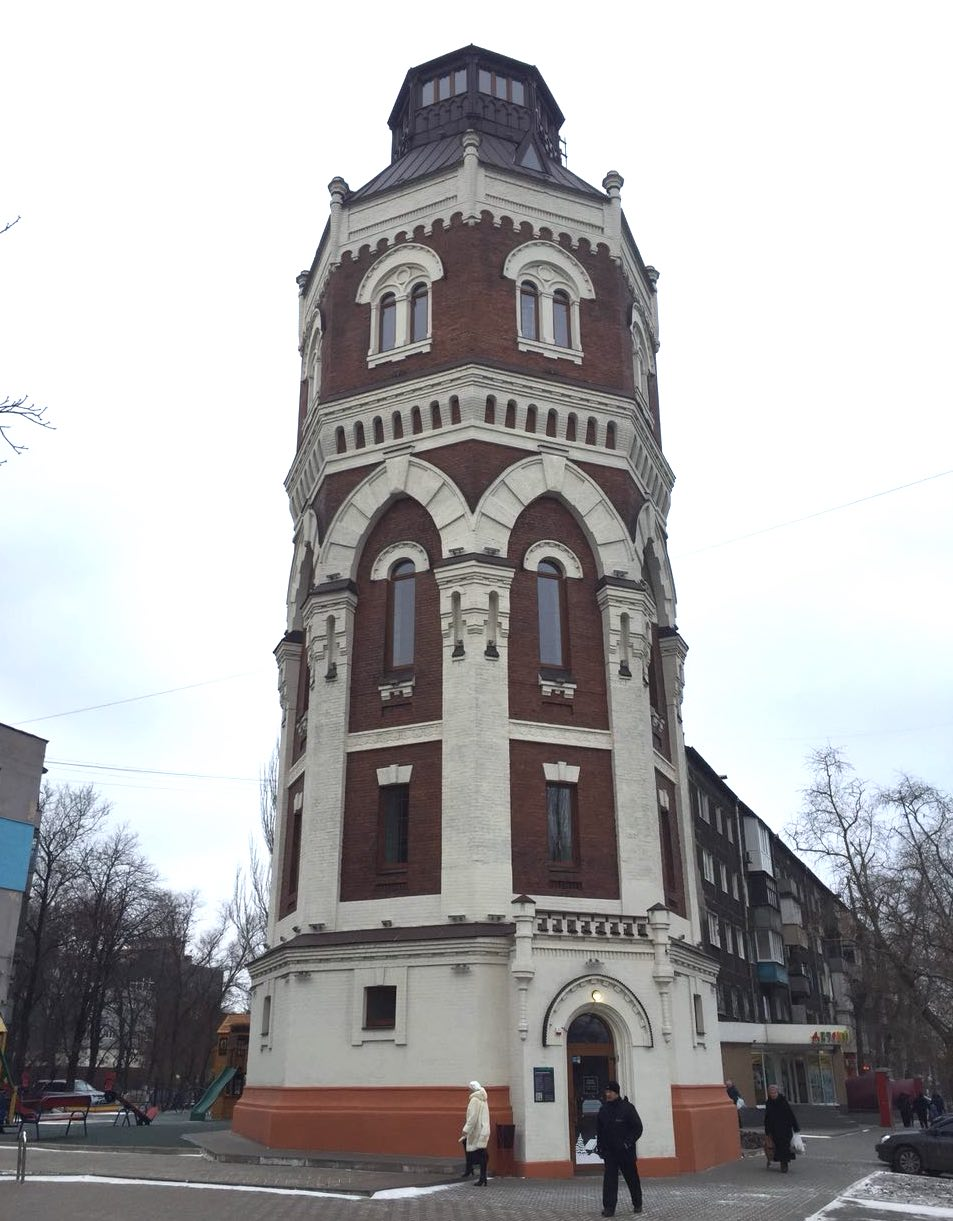
- Old water tower
- Interactive map of the Old Tower area

General information
- Location: Ukraine, Architect Nielsen Street, 36, Mariupol, Donetsk Oblast, 87500, Mariupol, Ukraine
- Coordinates: 47°05′52″N 37°32′50″E
- Completed: 1910

Height
- Height: 33 m (108 ft)

Design and construction
- Architect: Victor Nilsen

The Old Water Tower is an architectural monument of Mariupol in Ukraine. It is located in the central district at Architect Nilsen Street 36 (Ukrainian: вул. Архітектора Нільсена), at the intersection of Soborna Street and Enhel'sa St near Theatre Square. The tower was designed by architect Victor Nilsen and was completed in 1910.

Built of red brick, it features various architectural styles. The tower is 33 metres tall with a spiral stair case of 157 steps. Located on the highest point in the area, it was not only the tallest structure at the time, but stood out as well.

== History ==
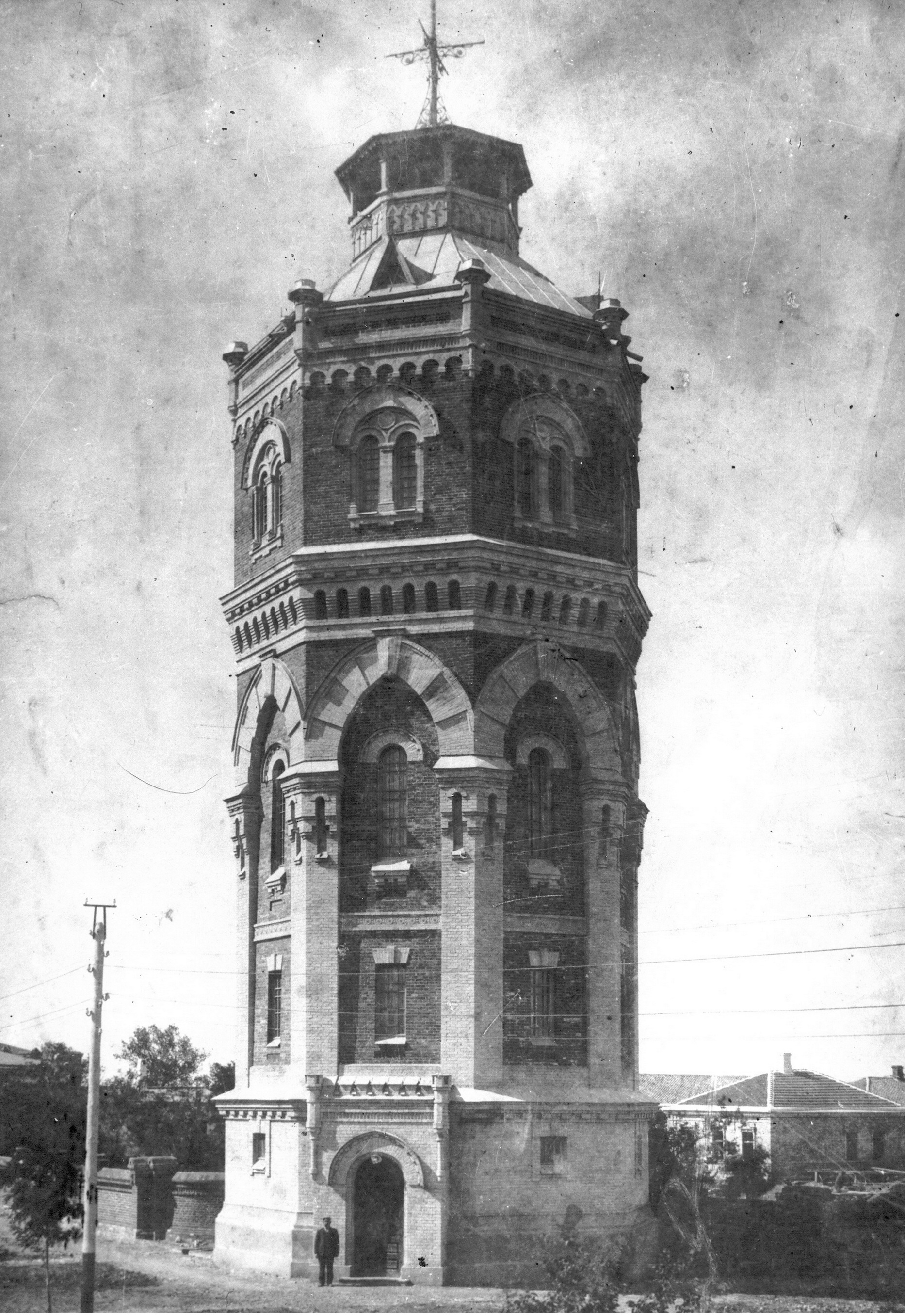
Water Tower 1910

In 1906, there was no water supply in Mariupol and water carriers delivered water in barrels for a fee from a source of drinking water on Malofontannaya Street to the homes of local residents.

On May 24, 1906, the Mariupol Duma (city council) adopted the proposal to secure a loan to finance the project of constructing a water supply network in Mariupol. The cost of its implementation was estimated at 360 thousand Rubles, which exceeded the city budget by far. Permission for obtaining a loan was granted by Pyotr Arkadyevich Stolypin, Chairman of the Council of Ministers and concurrently Minister of the Internal Affairs of the Russian Empire, and the Mayor was informed of it in February 1907.

On April 25, 1908, the Mariupol Duma approved of the detailed plan to build the water supply network, including the tower. The project was created by Victor Nilsen.

Construction work on the water tower and the city water supply system began in December 1909, and the city's water supply system started operating on July 3, 1910.

This was a branched water supply system, 21.5 kilometers long pipelines, with water intake columns where water was supplied with the help of the water tower. The water columns held booths for caretakers who collected payment for individually released volumes of water. A part of the line was directly brought into the homes of the privileged elite of Mariupol.

The water tower was used for its intended purpose until 1932, when the construction of a new centralized city water supply system, using piston pumps, began near the mouth of the Kalmius River. Subsequently, the tower was repurposed several times and firstly became an observation tower for firefighters.

Although the hostilities of the Second World War did not cause significant damage to the tower, it stood abandoned for some years after the firefighters were moved to another building.

In 1983, the tower was entered into the register of architectural monuments of local importance. Several years later, restoration work began, which included the application of a protective layer to its architectural details.

In the late 80s, the building housed a museum of urban planning of Mariupol.

From 1996 to 2012, the tower was occupied by a private bank, then transferred back to the city of Mariupol and came to house co-working spaces, a library, tourist center, observation deck and souvenir shop.

Since 2016, a creative space "VEZHA” (“Tower") has been created in the renovated tower, where exhibitions, concerts, lectures and other events are held.

The tower was damaged during the 2022 Siege of Mariupol. Compared to other historical buildings in the city, many of which were badly damaged, it survived the siege in good condition.

== Architecture ==
The tower was designed following eclecticism, a trend in architecture of the second half of the 19th century, in that it combines elements of various styles, here: Gothic, Renaissance and Baroque. Romanesque style is said to be found in the semicircular completion of arches and decorating details.

Each of the red-and-white brick faces of the octahedral four-tier tower ends with a roof slope at the foot of a circular glazed viewing platform under an eight-slope roof.

The walls of the structure are divided into three parts (first, second-third and fourth floors) by white-brick cornice masonry around the perimeter. The second and third floors are visually perceived as a single floor due to the framing of each side with flat decorative columns (pilasters). Each side of the fourth floor of the tower is cut through by windows grouped in twos.

The vertical division of the faces is made only at the level of the second or third floors with the help of a protruding volume with a lancet ending.

The external decor of the tower includes a semicircular design of the openings of the double windows of the fourth tier, elements of transition of the cornice above the upper tier to the plane of the roof slopes hanging over the walls, and relief of the parapet of the observation deck at its top.

== Gallery ==
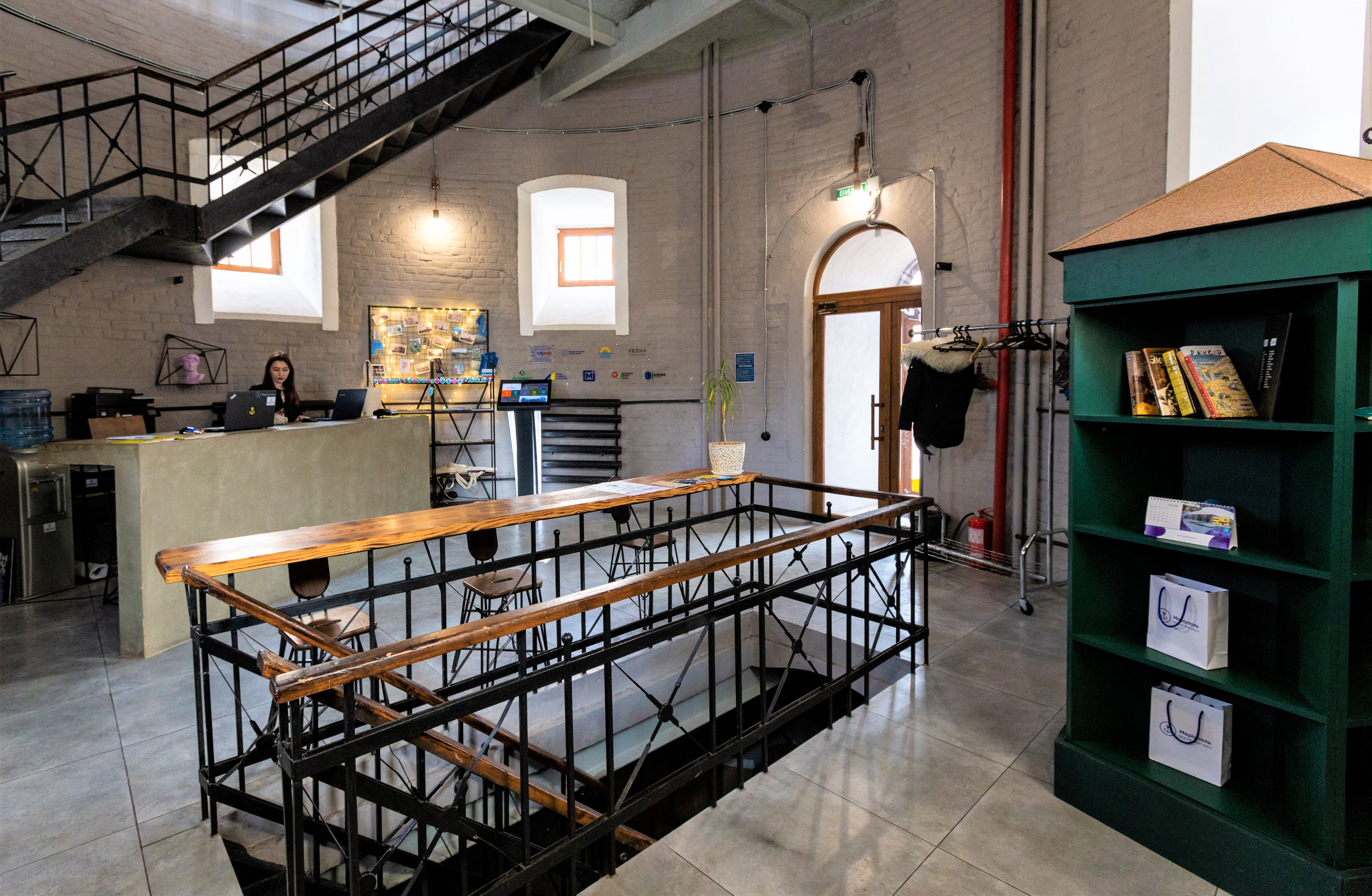
Interior view

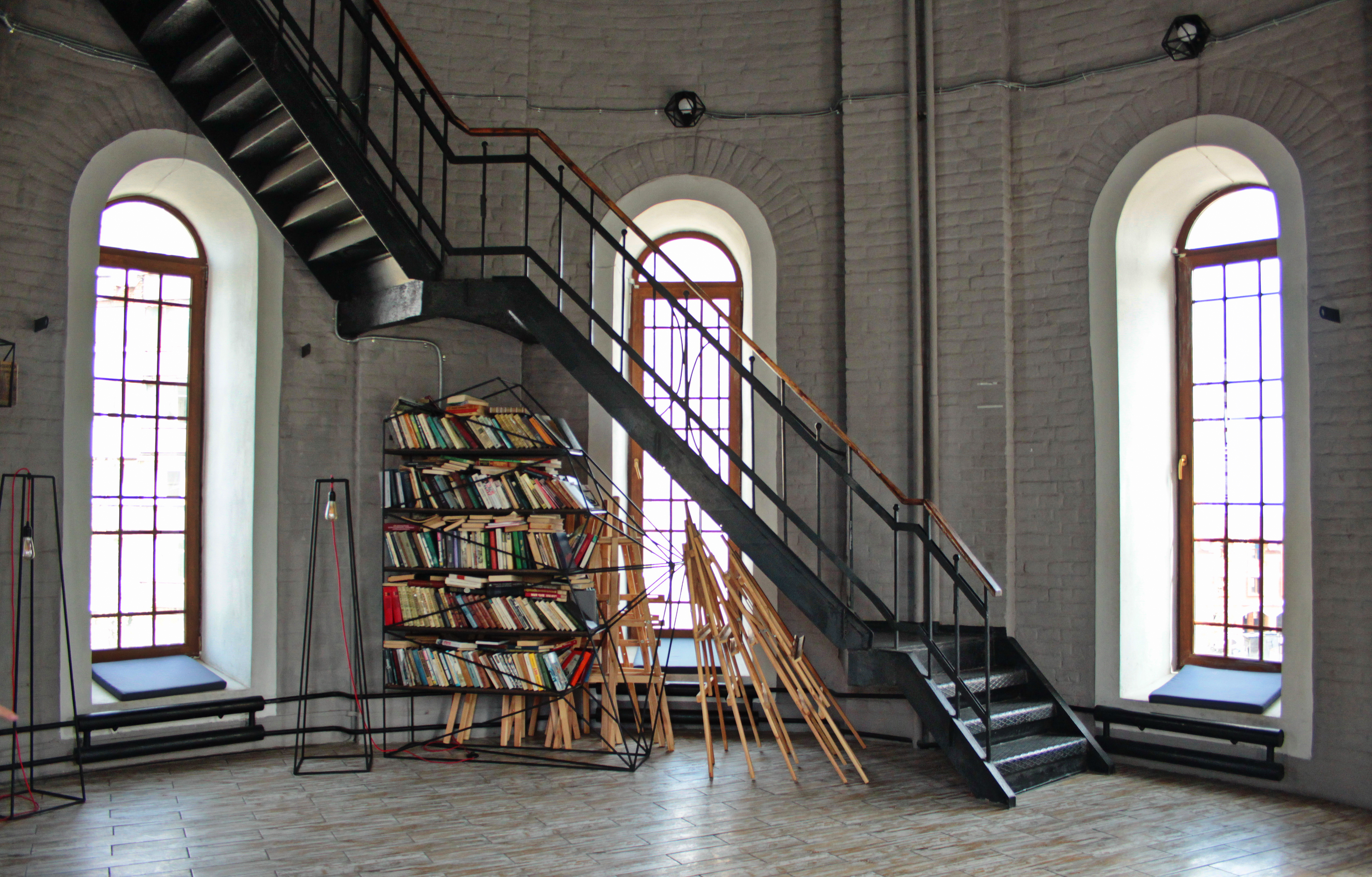
Interior view

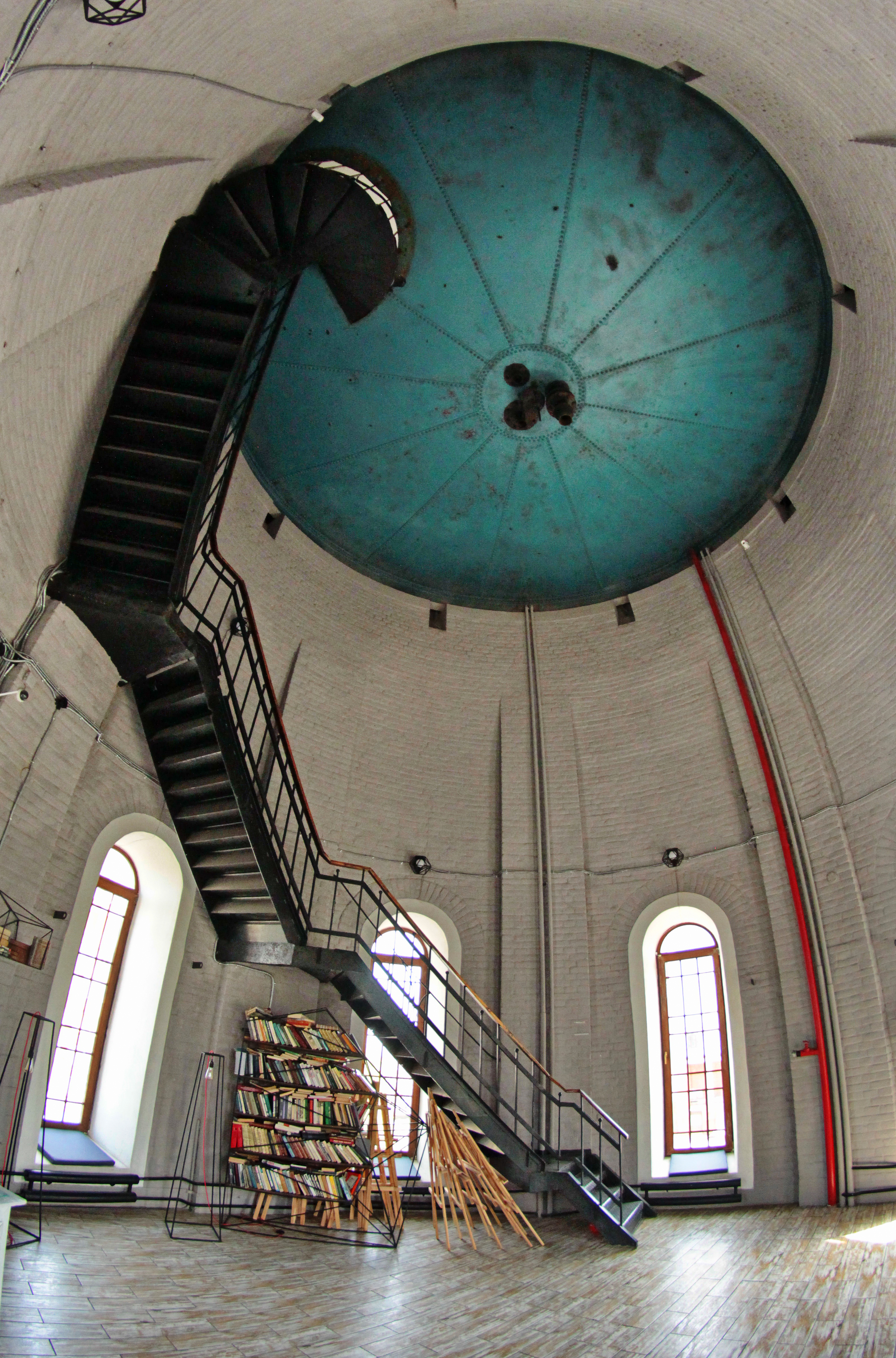
Interior view

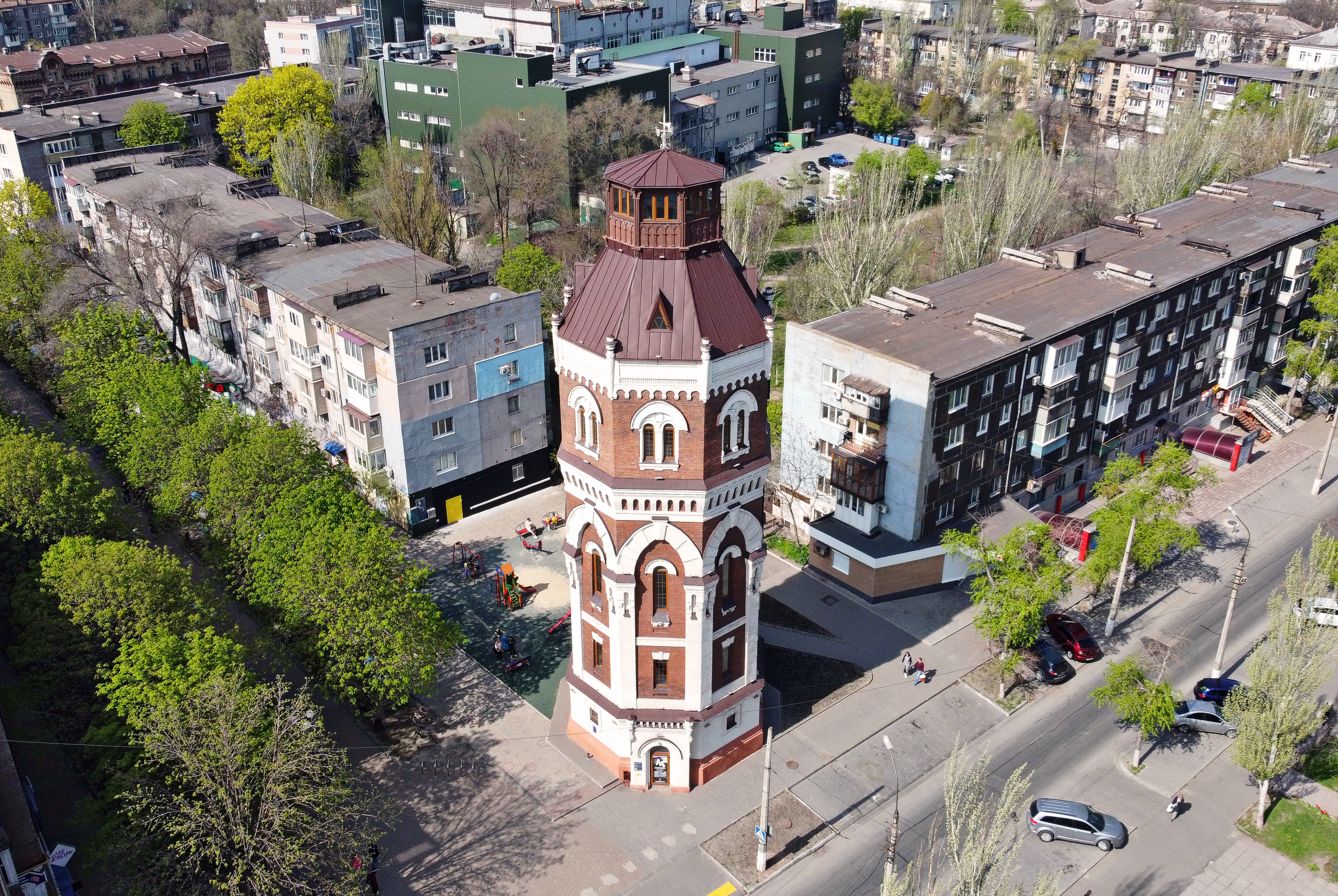
Aerial view

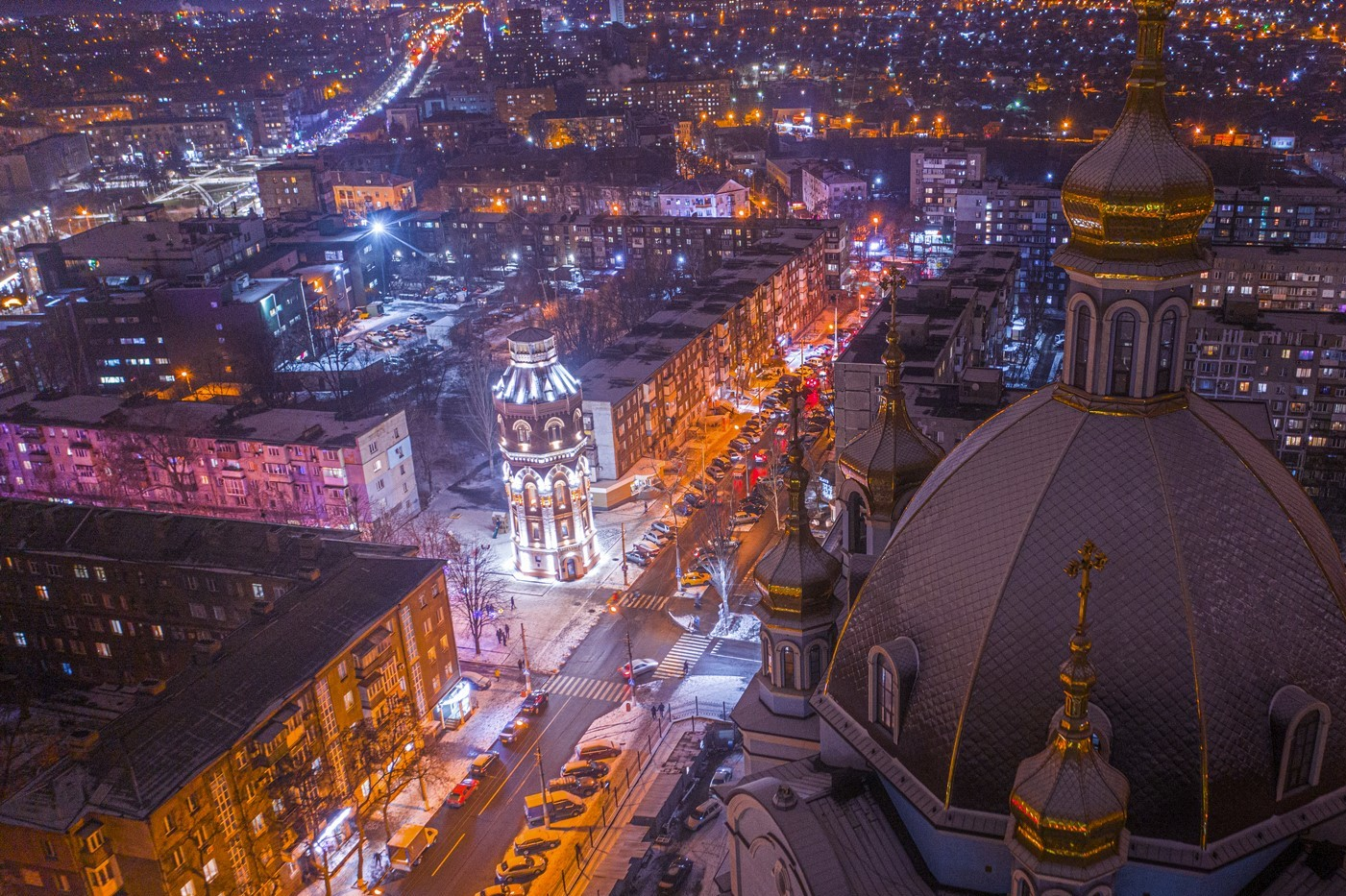
The water tower on a winter night

== Other information ==
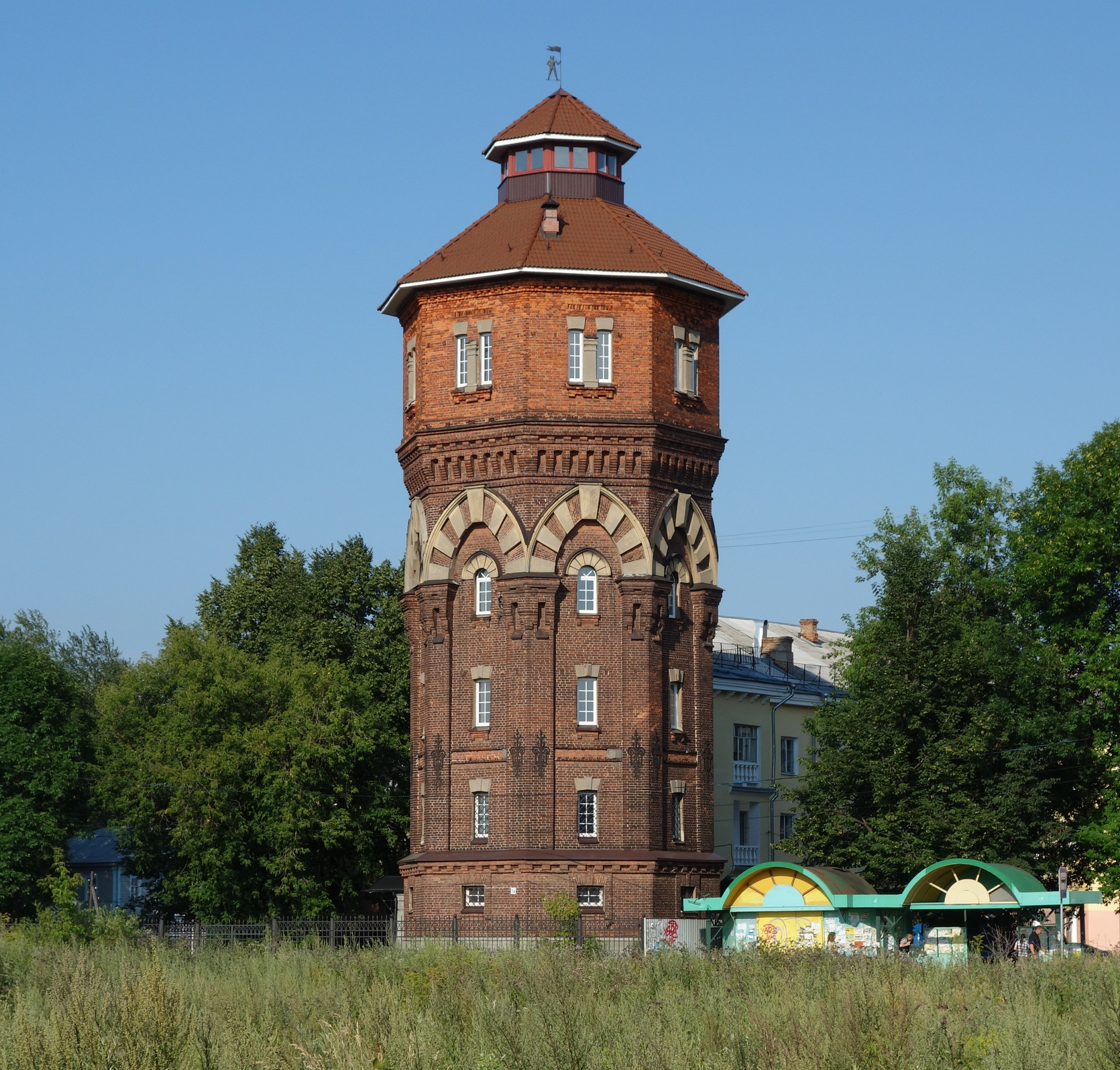
Water Tower in Rybinsk, Russia

The Mariupol water tower has a twin sister in Rybinsk, Yaroslavl Oblast in Russia, also a water tower designed by architect Victor Nielsen and completed in 1901.

== See also ==
- Misto Mariupol - close-up video images in and outside of the tower
- History of Mariupol
