= Donetsk Oblast =

Administrative division of Ukraine

Donetsk Oblast Донецька область
- Oblast (Note: Partially annexed by Russia as Donetsk People's Republic)
- Donetska oblast
- Flag Coat of arms
- Nickname: Донеччина (Donechchyna)
- Coordinates: 48.14°N 37.74°E
- Country: Ukraine
- Established: 3 June 1938
- Administrative center: Donetsk (de jure; 1938 – present, de facto until 2014); Mariupol (de facto; June – October 2014); Kramatorsk (de facto; October 2014 – present)

Government
  - Governor: Vadym Filashkin (Note: Governor recognized by Ukraine. The Russian-annexed Donetsk People's Republic, which controls part of Donetsk Oblast, is headed by Denis Pushilin.)
  - Oblast council: 150 seats

Area
  - Total: 26,517 km^{2} (10,238 sq mi)
  - Rank: Ranked 11th

Population (1 January 2022)
  - Total: 4,059,372 ▼
  - Rank: Ranked 1st
  - Density: 153.09/km^{2} (396.49/sq mi)
- Time zone: UTC+2 (EET)
  - Summer (DST): UTC+3 (EEST)
- Postal code: 83000–87999
- Area code: +380-62
- ISO 3166 code: UA-14
- Vehicle registration: АН
- Raions: 8
- Cities: 52
- Rural settlements: 375
- Villages: 963
- HDI (2022): 0.741 high
- FIPS 10-4: UP05
- NUTS statistical regions of Ukraine: UA21
- Website: dn.gov.ua

Donetsk Oblast, (Note: Ukrainian: Донецька область, romanized: Donetska oblast, IPA: [doˈnɛtsʲkɐ ˈɔblɐsʲtʲ], Russian: Донецкая область) also called Donechchyna (Ukrainian: Донеччина, IPA: [doˈnɛtʃːɪnɐ]), is an oblast in the Donbas region of eastern Ukraine that is currently four-fifths (80%) occupied by Russia. Before the Russo-Ukrainian War, it was Ukraine's most populous province, with around 4.1 million residents. The oblast is Ukraine's most urbanized, and includes the sprawling urban areas of Donetsk–Makiivka, Horlivka–Yenakiieve, and the port city of Mariupol. Its administrative center is Donetsk city, though due to the war it was moved to Kramatorsk.

The oblast is a coal-mining region and has a long association with the industry. From its creation in 1938 until November 1961, it bore the name Stalino Oblast, in honour of Joseph Stalin. As part of de-Stalinization, it was renamed after the Donets, the main river of eastern Ukraine, and the Donets Ridge.

At the last census in 2001, the population of Donetsk Oblast was 57% ethnic Ukrainian and 38% ethnic Russian. Meanwhile, 75% of people in Donetsk Oblast had Russian as their mother tongue and 24% had Ukrainian, although most Ukrainian citizens could speak both.

In 2014, parts of the oblast, including Donetsk, were taken over by Russian-backed separatists who declared an independent Donetsk People's Republic. This sparked an eight-year war against government forces. The separatists controlled about one-third of Donetsk Oblast, and Ukraine declared this to be under Russian occupation. During the 2022 Russian invasion of Ukraine, renewed heavy fighting erupted, and in September 2022 Russia declared the annexation of the whole oblast, though it had only conquered 60% at the time, and the annexation was not recognized internationally.

== History ==
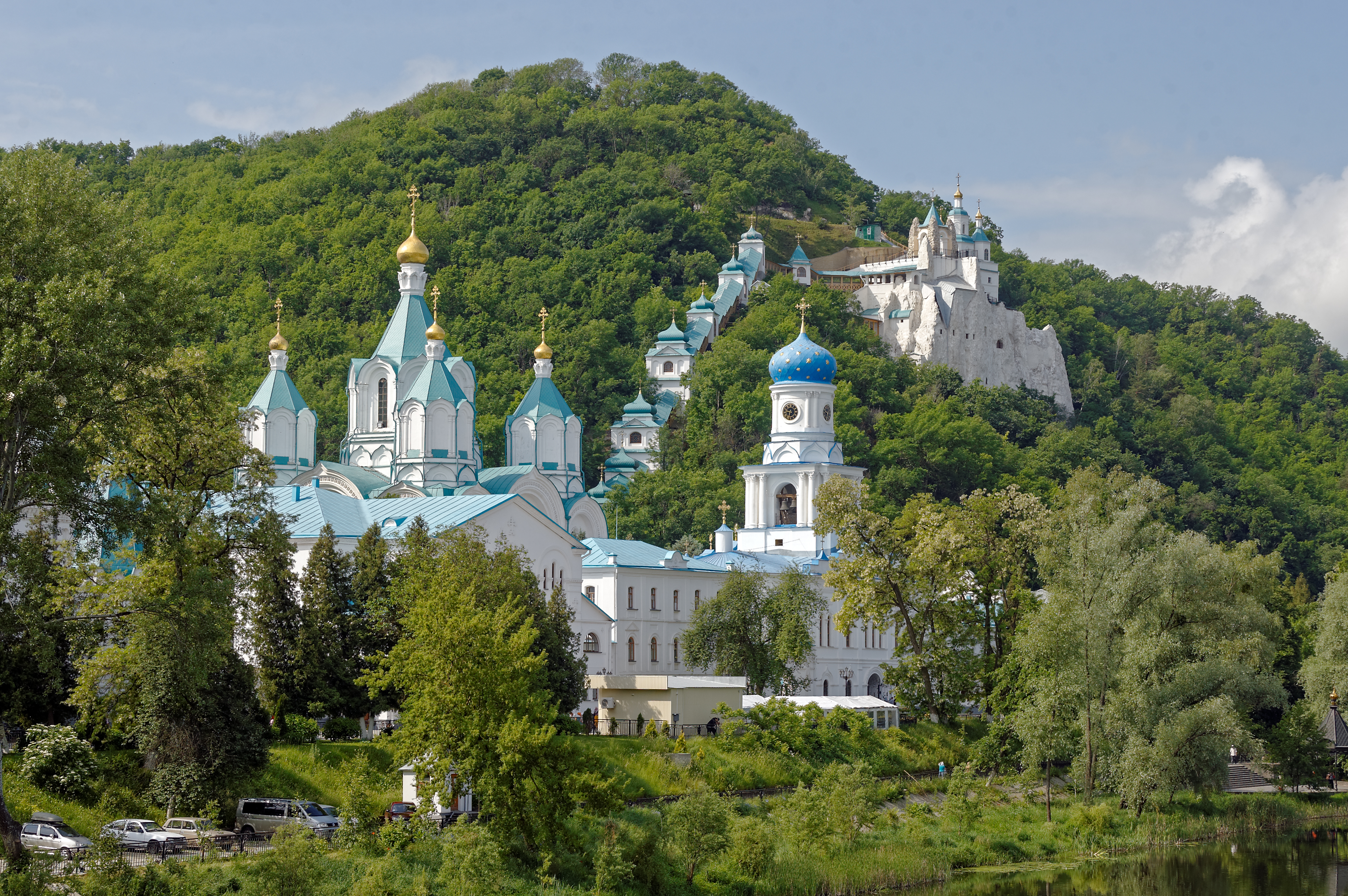
Sviatohirsk Lavra, one of the oldest historical landmarks of Donetsk Oblast

Donetsk Oblast is located within the historic regions of Zaporizhzhia (western and central part), Sloboda Ukraine (northern part) and Pryazovia (southern part). In the mid-18th-century, the north-eastern outskirts formed part of Slavo-Serbia with its capital in Bakhmut.

Before the establishment of Donetsk Oblast, three districts (okruhas) existed on its territory from 1923 to 1930. The Donets Governorate was terminated in 1925. As part of Soviet Ukraine, Donetsk Oblast was established on 2 July 1932 out of the Kharkiv Oblast, the Dnipropetrovsk Oblast, and a number of raions that were under the direct administration of Kharkiv (then-capital of the Ukrainian Soviet Socialist Republic). Artemivsk (today Bakhmut) served as the oblast's administrative center for two weeks until 16 July 1932, when the city of Stalino (today Donetsk) took on the role. Until 1938, the Donetsk Oblast included the territories of the modern Luhansk Oblast. In June 1938 it was split into the Stalino Oblast (modern Donetsk Oblast) and the Voroshylovhrad Oblast (modern Luhansk Oblast).

During the Nazi German occupation from fall 1941 to fall 1943, Donetsk Oblast was known as Yuzivka Oblast (after the original name of Donetsk). During World War II, it was the site of several war crimes, including the German-perpetrated Artemivsk massacre and Soviet-perpetrated Massacre of Grischino.

As part of de-Stalinization in the Soviet Union, in 1961 Stalino and Stalino Oblast were renamed Donetsk and Donetsk Oblast.

During the dissolution of the Soviet Union, 83.9% of voters in Donetsk Oblast approved Ukraine's declaration of independence in the 1991 referendum.

In the mid-1990s, the region became known for its heightened criminal activity, including the killings of high-profile business people such as Akhat Bragin and Yevhen Shcherban. Donetsk Oblast was also a base for Ukraine's main pro-Russian political faction, Party of Regions, which became part of the Ukrainian government in 2002 and paved a way into Ukrainian politics for the powerful "Donetsk Clan".

In late 2004, the Party of Regions was involved in the creation of a political project, the South-East Ukrainian Autonomous Republic, which was intended to include Donetsk Oblast. Having close ties with the Russian government, the Party of Regions, along with local communists and other pro-Russian activists, instigated the pro-Russian unrest which escalated into the war in Donbas. In May 2014, the Ukrainian government lost control over its border with Russia in Donetsk Oblast.

On 30 September 2022 Russia, amid its invasion of Ukraine, annexed Donetsk (Donetsk People's Republic), Luhansk (Luhansk People's Republic), Zaporizhzhia, and Kherson Oblasts. The United Nations General Assembly subsequently passed a resolution calling on countries not to recognize what it described as an "attempted illegal annexation", demanded that Russia "immediately, completely and unconditionally withdraw", while most nations of the world have not recognized the annexations. As of August 2025, Russia controls about 75% of the oblast.

== Geography ==
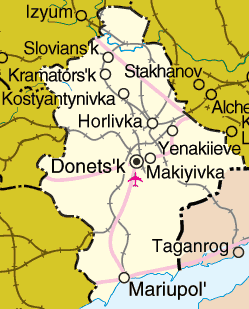
Detailed map of Donetsk Oblast

Donetsk Oblast is located in southeastern Ukraine. The area of the oblast (26,517 km^{2}) comprises about 4.4% of the total area of the country. The oblast borders the Dnipropetrovsk and Zaporizhzhia Oblasts to the southwest, the Kharkiv Oblast to the north, the Luhansk Oblast to the northeast, the Rostov Oblast in Russia to the east, and the Sea of Azov to the south.

Its extent from north to south is 270 km, from east to west – 190 km. The extreme points of the oblast's borders are: Bilosarayska Kosa (spit) in the south, Shevchenko of Volnovakha Raion in the west, Verkhnii Kut of Horlivka Raion in the east, and Lozove of Kramatorsk Raion in the north.

There are 27 monuments of national significance in Donetsk Oblast. The State Historic and Architectural Reserve near the city of Sviatohirsk covering the Sviatohirsk Lavra was nominated for the Seven Wonders of Ukraine.

== Administrative divisions ==
Since 2020, Donetsk Oblast has been divided into eight raions (districts), each named after its administrative center:

Map	No.	Name in English	Name in Ukrainian	Romanization	Admin. center
	1	Kramatorsk Raion	Краматорський район	Kramatorskyi raion	Kramatorsk
	2	Bakhmut Raion	Бахмутський район	Bakhmutskyi raion	Bakhmut
	3	Pokrovsk Raion	Покровський район	Pokrovskyi raion	Pokrovsk
	4	Horlivka Raion	Горлівський район	Horlivskyi raion	Horlivka
	5	Volnovakha Raion	Волноваський район	Volnovaskyi raion	Volnovakha
	6	Donetsk Raion	Донецький район	Donetskyi raion	Donetsk
	7	Mariupol Raion	Маріупольський район	Mariupolskyi raion	Mariupol
	8	Kalmiuske Raion	Кальміуський район	Kalmiuskyi raion	Kalmiuske

Each raion is in turn divided up into hromadas.

== Demographics ==
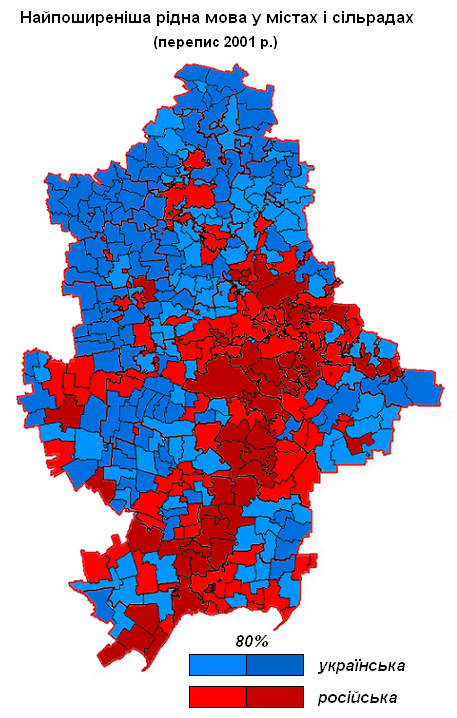
Map showing the percentage of Russian speakers (red) and Ukrainian speakers (blue) in Donetsk Oblast at the last census

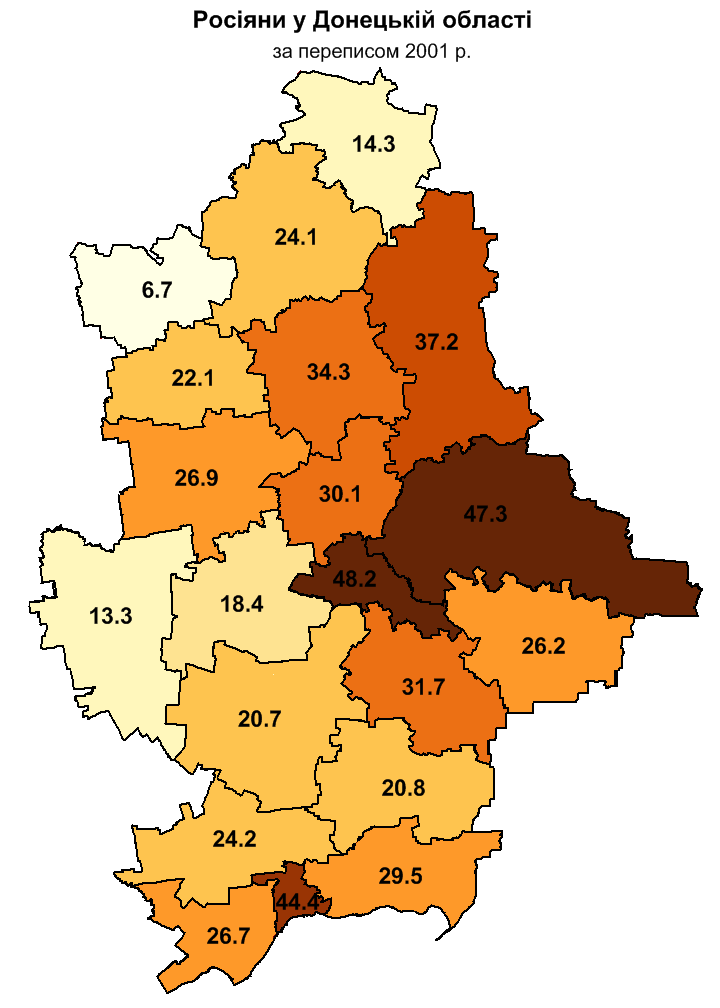
Map showing the percentage of ethnic Russians in Donetsk Oblast at the last census

In 2013, the population of Donetsk Oblast was 4.43 million, which constituted 10% of the overall Ukrainian population, making it the most populous and most densely populated region of the country, except for the cities with special status (Kyiv and Sevastopol). Its large population is due to the presence of several big industrial cities and numerous villages agglomerated around them.

Historical population
Year	Pop.	±%
1970	4,891,979	—
1979	5,160,641	+5.5%
1989	5,332,395	+3.3%
2001	4,841,074	−9.2%
2011	4,433,011	−8.4%
2022	4,059,372	−8.4%

During the 2004 presidential election, political supporters of Viktor Yanukovych threatened to demand autonomy for Donetsk and neighboring oblasts if the election of their candidate was not recognized. However, no official moves were ever made.

At the 2001 Ukrainian National Census, the ethnic groups within Donetsk Oblast were: Ukrainians – 2,744,100 (56.9%), Russians – 1,844,400 (38.2%), Pontic Greeks – 77,500 (1.6%), Belarusians – 44,500 (0.9%), others (2.3%).

At the 2001 census, the languages spoken within the oblast were: Russian (spoken by 98.6% of Russians living there, 58.7% of Ukrainians, 91.3% of Greeks, and 85.5% of Belarusians) and Ukrainian (spoken by 41.2% of Ukrainians, 1.3% of Russians, 3.2% of Greeks, and 3.9% of Belarusians). Overall, 74.9% of residents spoke Russian, while 24.1% spoke Ukrainian.

Year	Fertility	Birth	Year	Fertility	Birth	Year	Fertility	Birth
1990	1,6	58 050	2000	0,9	30 042	2010	1,2	41 258
1991	1,5	54 466	2001	0,9	29 931	2011	1,3	41 720
1992	1,4	50 258	2002	0,9	31 216	2012	1,3	42 839
1993	1,3	46 344	2003	0,9	33 433			
1994	1,2	43 195	2004	1,0	35 526			
1995	1,1	38 808	2005	1,0	35 883			
1996	1,1	36 349	2006	1,1	39 327			
1997	1,0	34 347	2007	1,2	40 560			
1998	1,0	33 518	2008	1,3	44 394			
1999	0,9	30 503	2009	1,3	43 373			

=== Age structure ===
0–14 years: 12.6% ▲ (male 283,584/female 266,977)
15–64 years: 70.4% ▼ (male 1,453,273/female 1,619,241)
65 years and over: 17.0% (male 243,048/female 496,434) (2013 official)

=== Median age ===
total: 41.9 years ▲
male: 38.0 years ▲
female: 45.8 years ▲ (2013 official)

== Economy ==
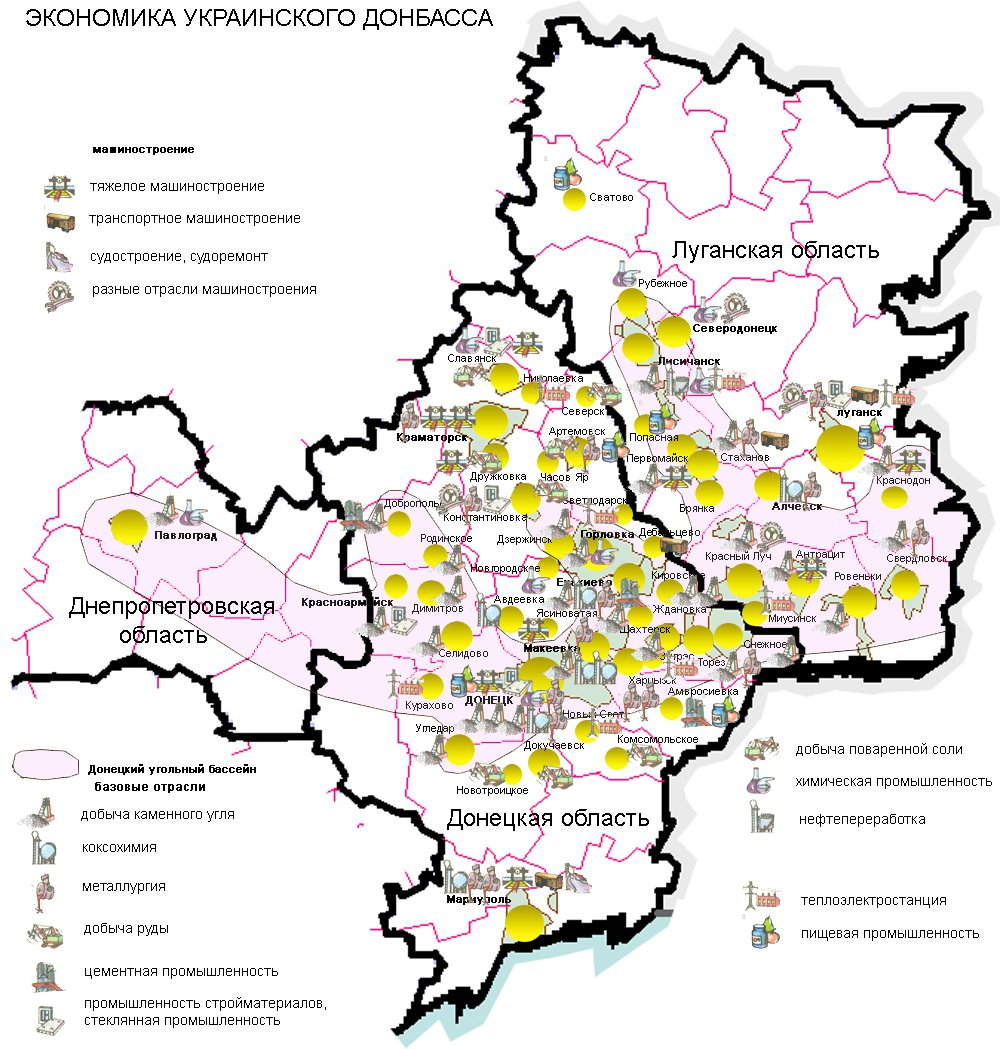
Map of the economic activity in the Donbas, including Donetsk Oblast.

=== Industry ===
Donetsk Oblast accounts for more than one half of the coal, finished steel, coke, cast iron and steel production in Ukraine. Ferrous metallurgy, fuel industry and power industry are in demand in the structure of industry production. There are about 882 industry enterprises that are on independent balance, and 2,095 small industry enterprises in the oblast.

The oblast has a developed transport infrastructure which includes the Donetsk railway (covers 40% of national transportation), the Mariupol Port, the Donetsk International Airport, passenger airports in Mariupol and Kramatorsk, and dense road systems. In Donetsk Oblast two special economic zones have been created, Donetsk and Azov, which have a privileged tax regime.

=== Agriculture ===
In 1999, the gross grain yield in the oblast was about 999.1 thousand tons, sugar beets – 27.1 thousand tons, sunflower seeds – 309.4 thousand tons, and potatoes – 380.2 thousand tons. Also, 134.2 thousand tons of meat, 494.3 thousand tons of milk and 646.4 million eggs have been produced. At the beginning of 1999 there were 2108 farms within the oblast.

== Geology ==
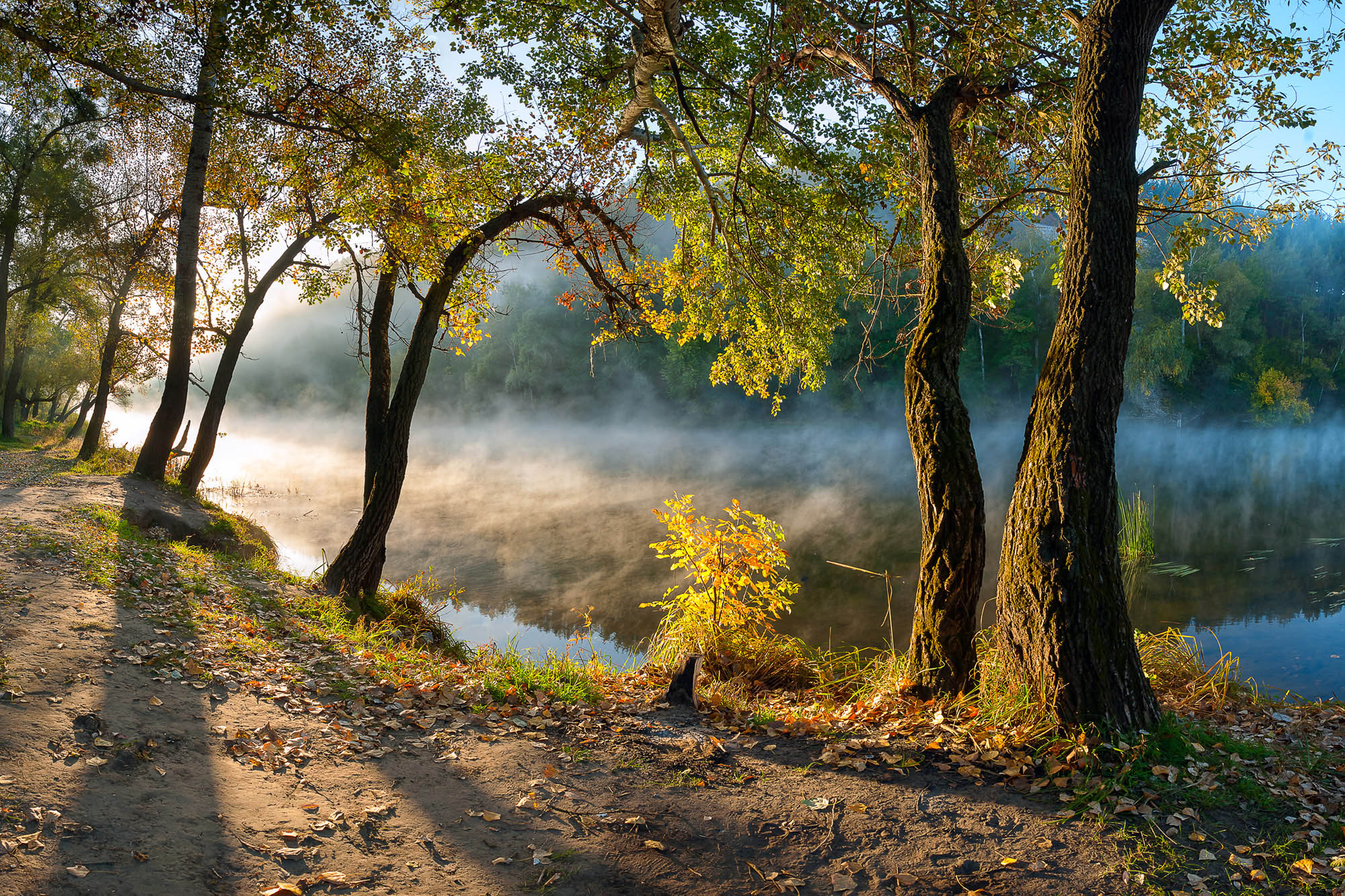
Holy Mountains National Nature Park

Donetsk Oblast's climate is mostly continental, which is characterized by hot summers and relatively cold winters with changeable snow surfaces. East and southeast strong winds, high temperatures and heavy rain showers are typical in the summer. The average annual rainfall is 524 mm.

The basic minerals found here are: coal (reserves – 25 billion tons), rock salt, lime carbonate, potassium, mercury, asbestos, and graphite. The area is also rich in fertile black earth.

Important resources for recreation within the area are: the mild climate, the Sea of Azov coast, curative mud, sources of minerals, and radon and table water. Due to these numerous recreation resources, many resort hotels and camps are located here. There are about 26 health centers and pensions, 52 rest homes and boarding houses, and rest camps for children in the oblast.

The curative areas in the oblast include the Slovyansk salt lakes and mineral water sources. The oblast also contains many park zones, some of which are of great national value. They include the Khomutivsky steppe and the Azov sea coast. Overall, Donetsk Oblast contains about 70 protected park and nature attractions including branches of the Ukrainian steppe park, six state reserves, ten memorials of nature, landscapes, and six park tracts.

== Polls ==
During the 1991 referendum, 83.90% of votes in Donetsk Oblast were in favor of the Declaration of Independence of Ukraine, fourth lowest in the country after Crimea, Sevastopol and Luhansk Oblast. A survey conducted in December 2014 by the Kyiv International Institute of Sociology found 18.5% of the oblast's population supported their region joining Russia, 53.8% did not support the idea, 22.5% were undecided, and 5.2% did not respond; insurgent-controlled areas (which hold over 50% of the population) were not polled.

== Gallery ==
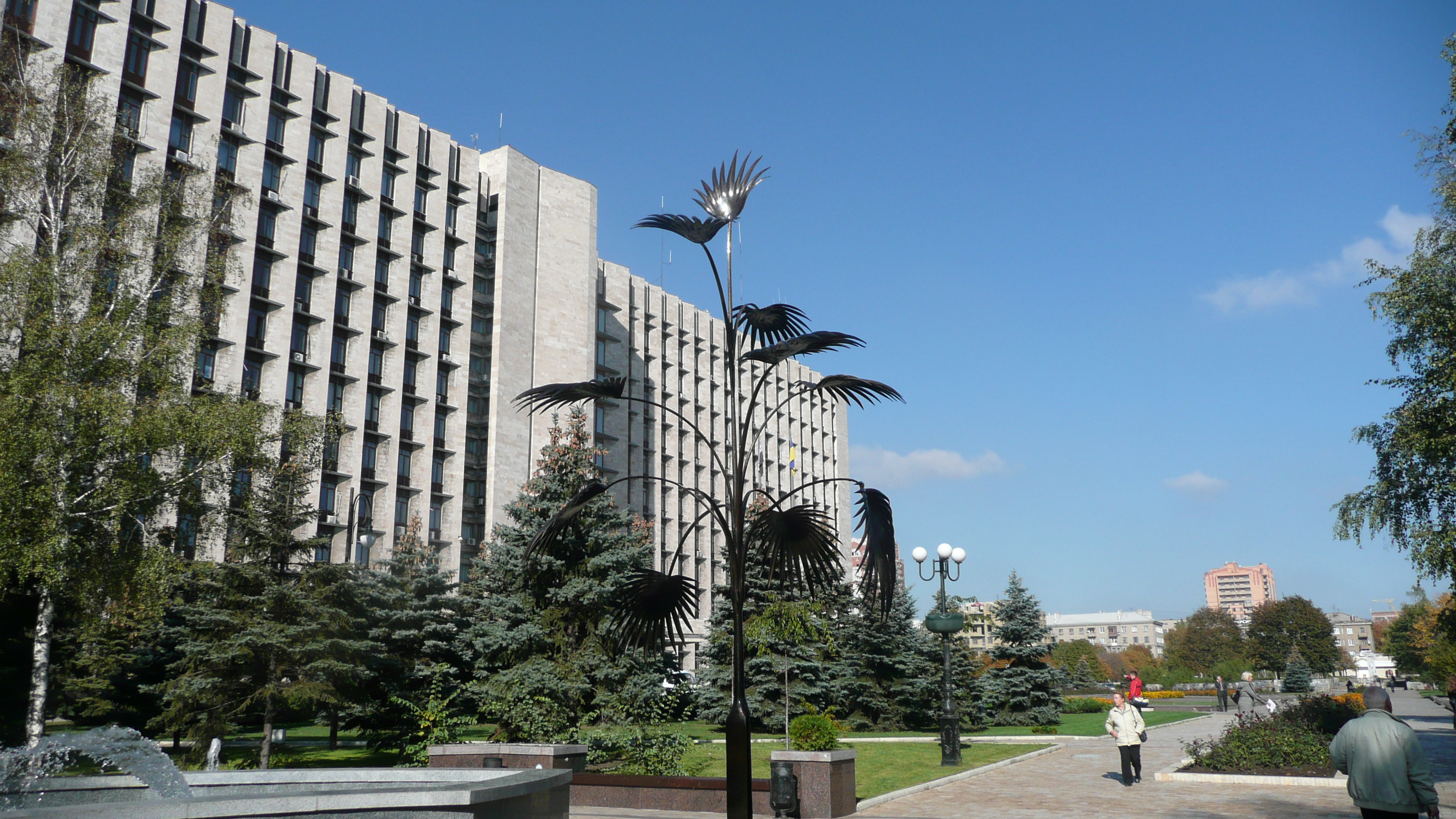
Donetsk Regional Administration

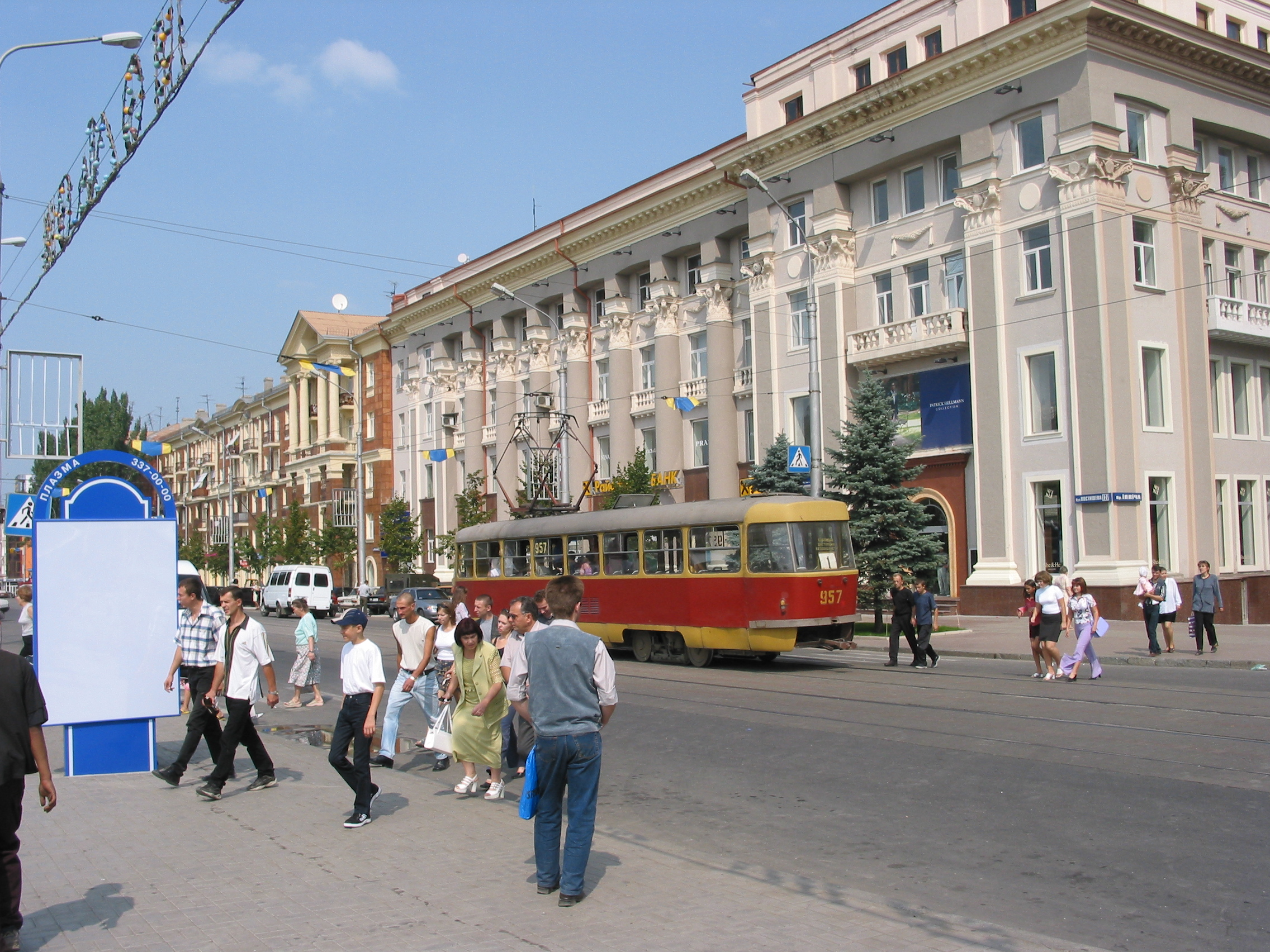
Postysheva Street, Donetsk

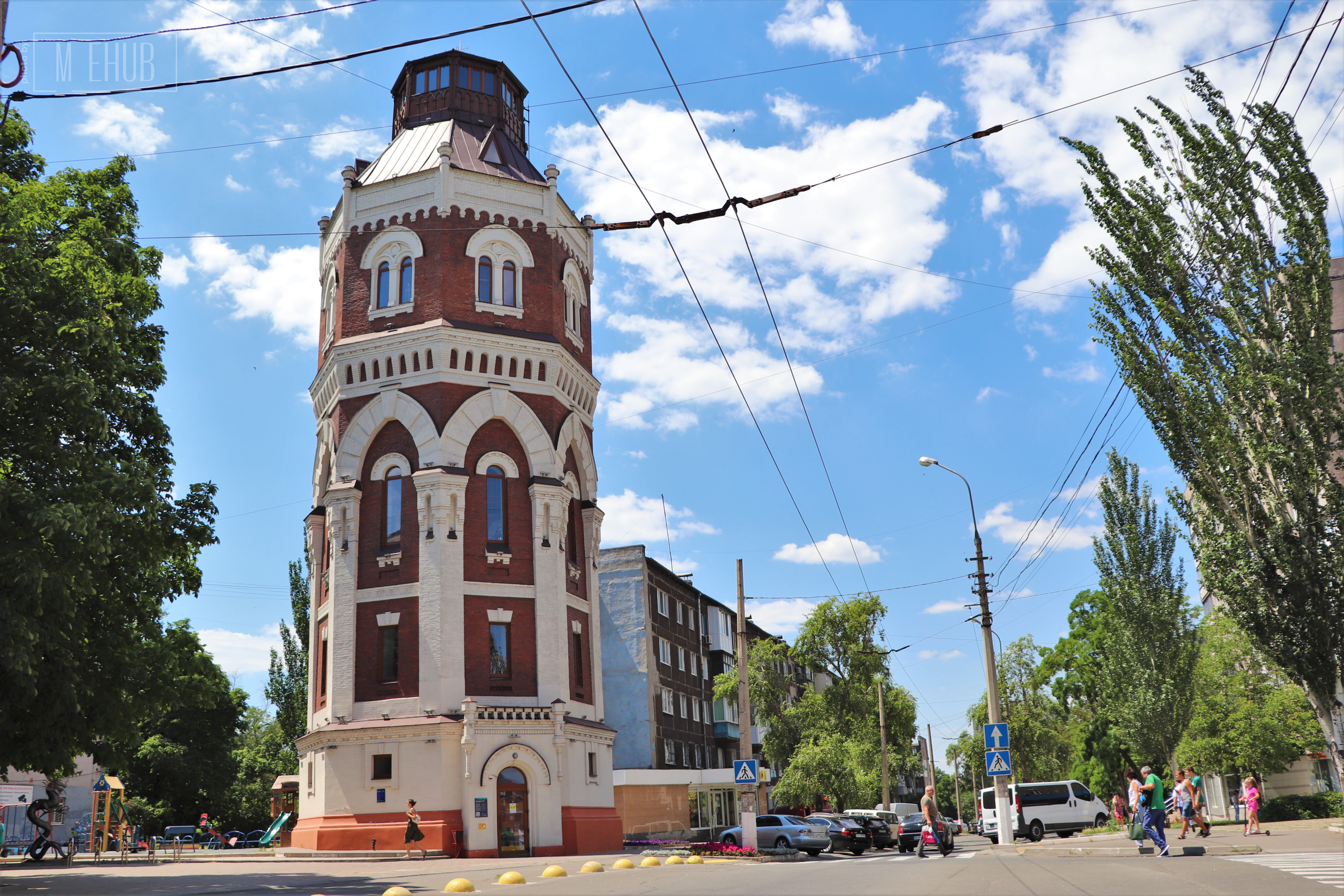
Old Tower, Mariupol

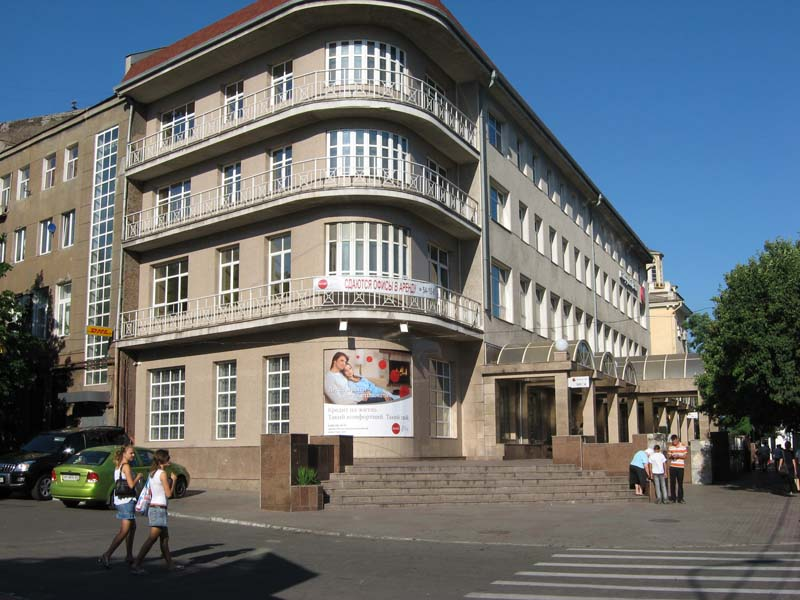
International Bank, Mariupol

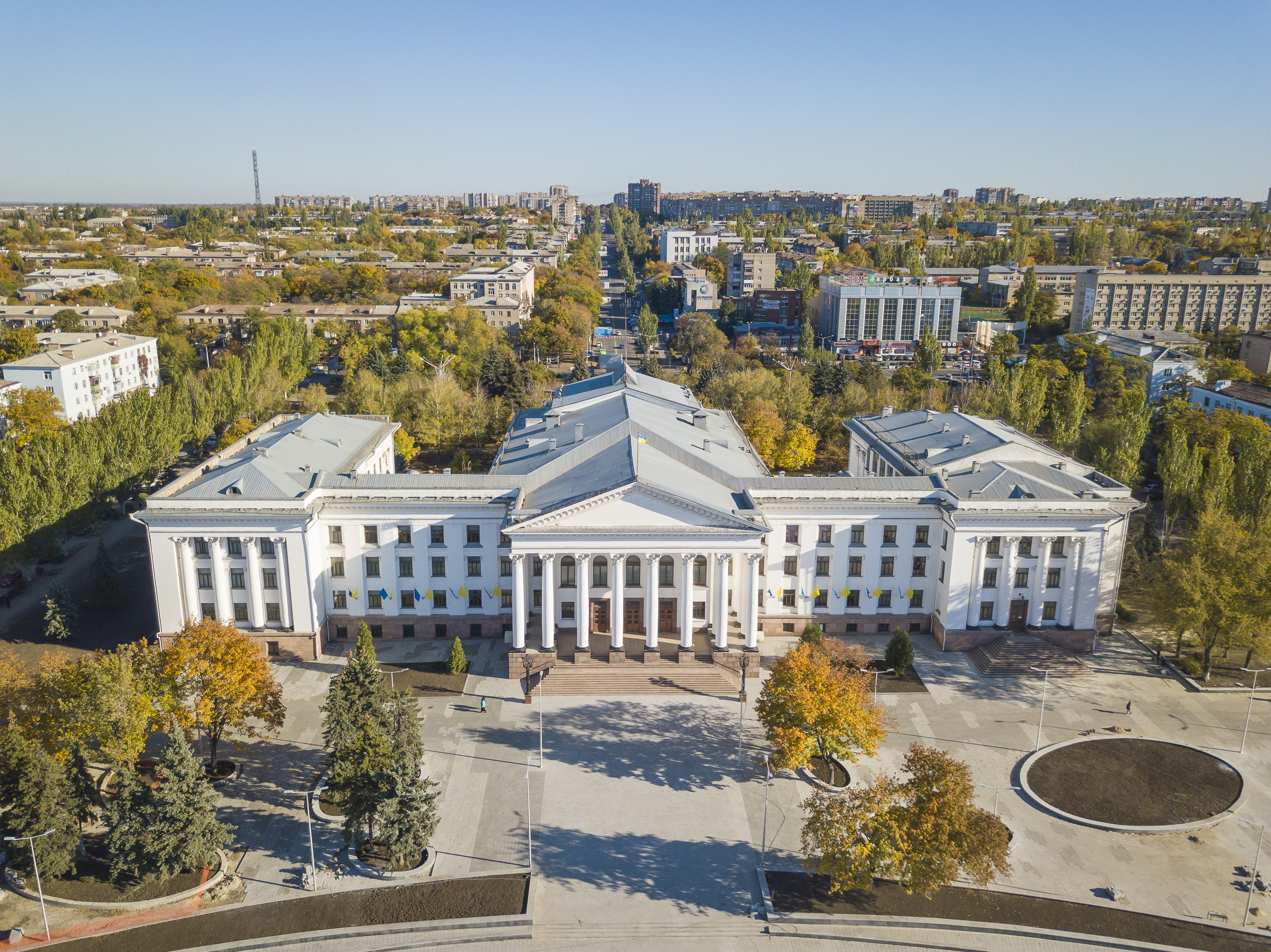
Palace of Culture, Kramatorsk

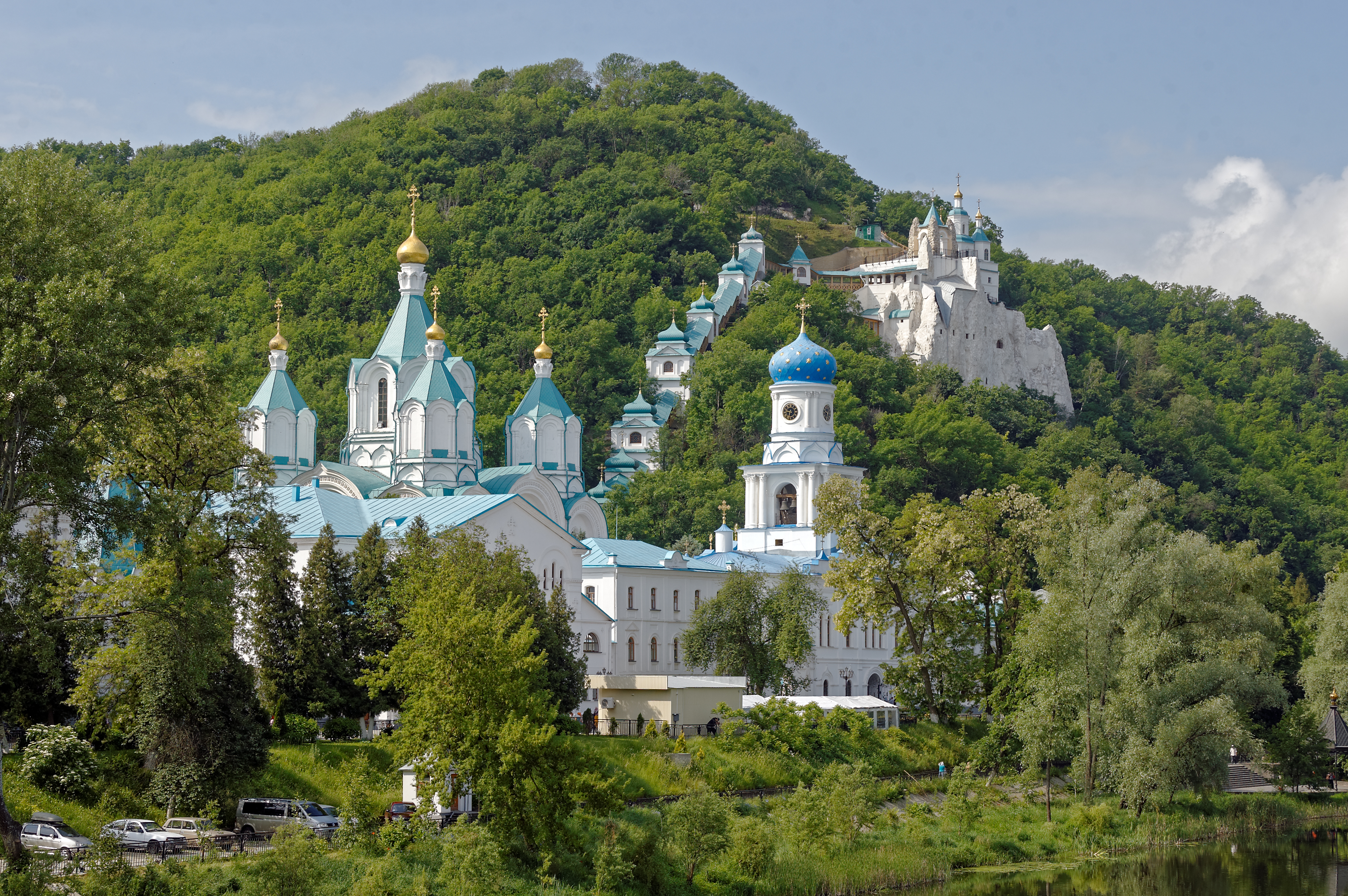
Sviatohirsk Lavra

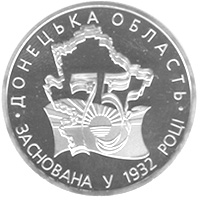
Jubilee coin of the National Bank of Ukraine

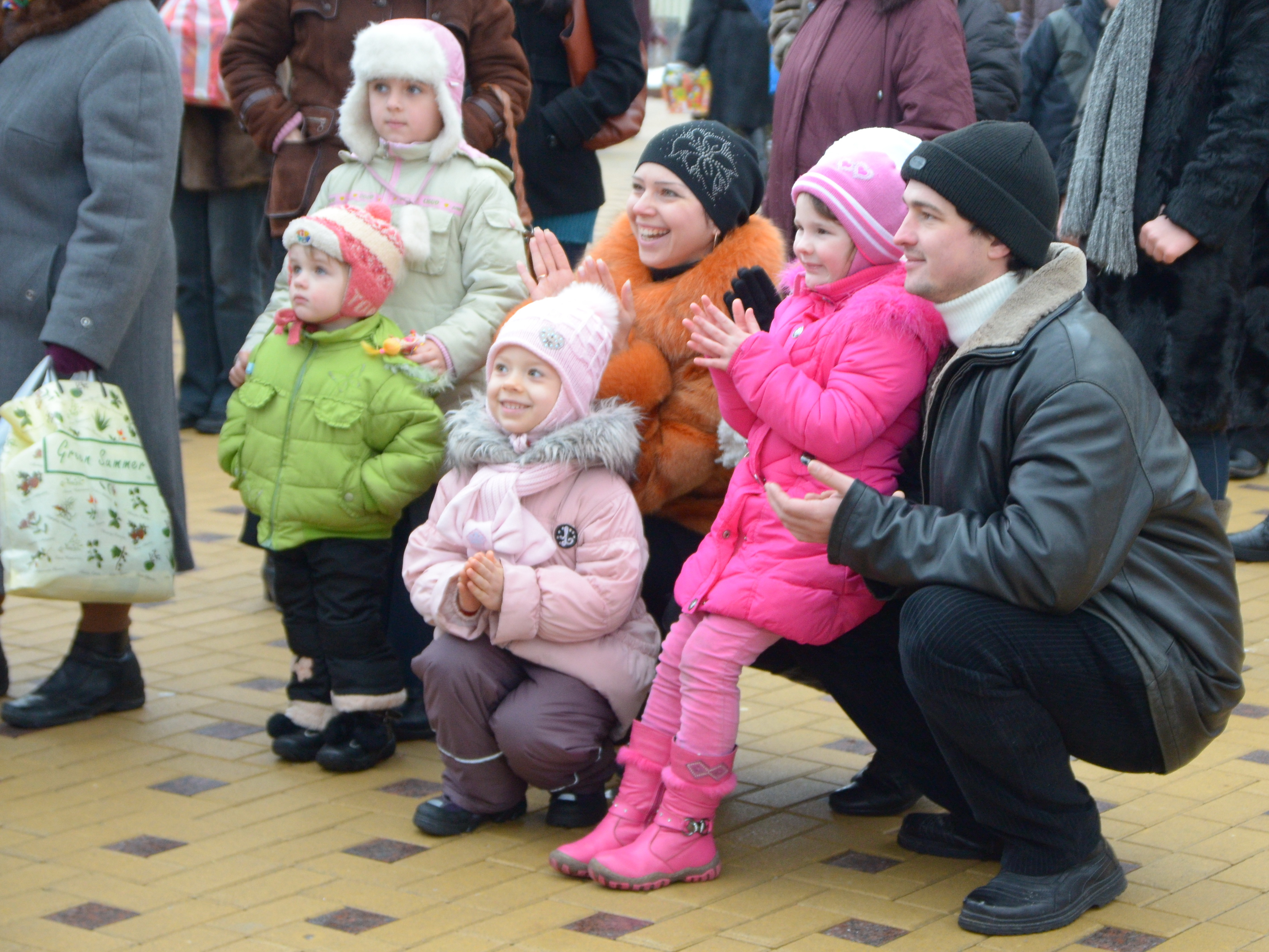
Young family in Donetsk

== See also ==
- Administrative divisions of Ukraine
- List of cities in Donetsk Oblast
