= Victor Nilsen =

Russian city architect

Victor Alexandrovich Nilsen
- Виктор Александрович Нильсен
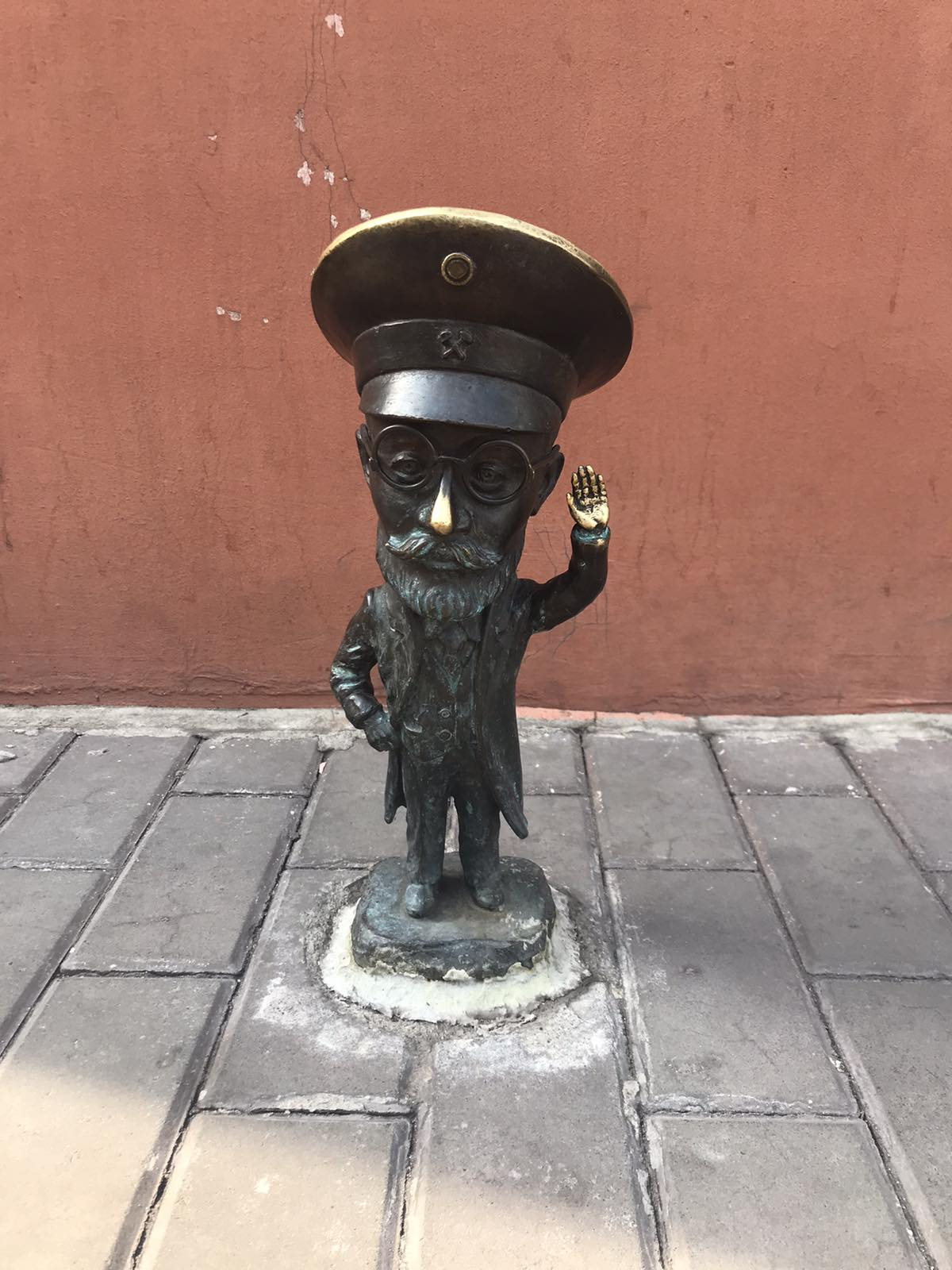
- The Statue of Victor Alexandrovich Nilsen
- Born: 1871; Saint Petersburg
- Died: 1949 (aged 77–78); Dushanbe
- Occupation: Architect
- Buildings: House of the weeping nymphs, House of the Lions, Pryazovskyi State Technical University, Saints Constantine and Helen Church (Mariupol), Old tower

Victor Alexandrovich Nilsen (Russian: Виктор Александрович Нильсен, born in 1871 in Saint Petersburg; died in 1949 in Dushanbe) was an engineer, city architect of Mariupol from 1901 to 1917 and publicist and a deputy in the Mariupol Duma (city council).

== History ==
Nilsen was a man of Danish and German origin. Victor had two brothers and a sister. He studied in St. Petersburg, where he graduated from the Institute of Engineers. He began to work as an architect and engineer in the city of Rybinsk on the Volga. In 1900 he was appointed by the mayor of Mariupol Ivan Alexeyevich Popov as architect of the city of Mariupol. The predecessors were Samuel Jossipovitch Ber and Adolf Gustavovitch Emerik. The architect Victor Nilsen designed and built the Saints Constantine and Helen Church between 1903 and 1911. The Old tower was also designed by this architect and was completed in 1910. He also designed and built his two houses. A house is located opposite the city garden at 49 Semenichina Street and has the nickname “House of the weeping nymphs. The city architect dedicated this building to his daughter, who died of typhoid fever. In her honor, he placed a face of a nymph on the house. The nymph's face is similar to the face of his daughter. When it rains, drops flow down the face like tears. It seems that the nymph is crying about the dead girl. Nilsen's other house was the House of the Lions.

In addition, he designed and built in 1911 the eparchial school (now Pryazovskyi State Technical University) . The other buildings were the Nikopol Factory School (now Secondary School No. 21) and the “Spartak” Hotel.

== Buildings ==
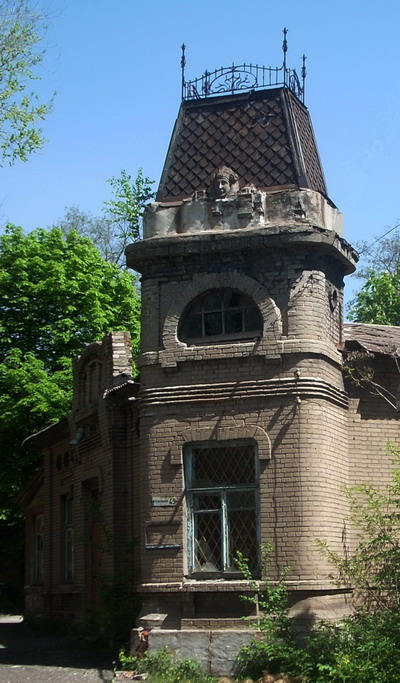
House of the weeping nymphs,

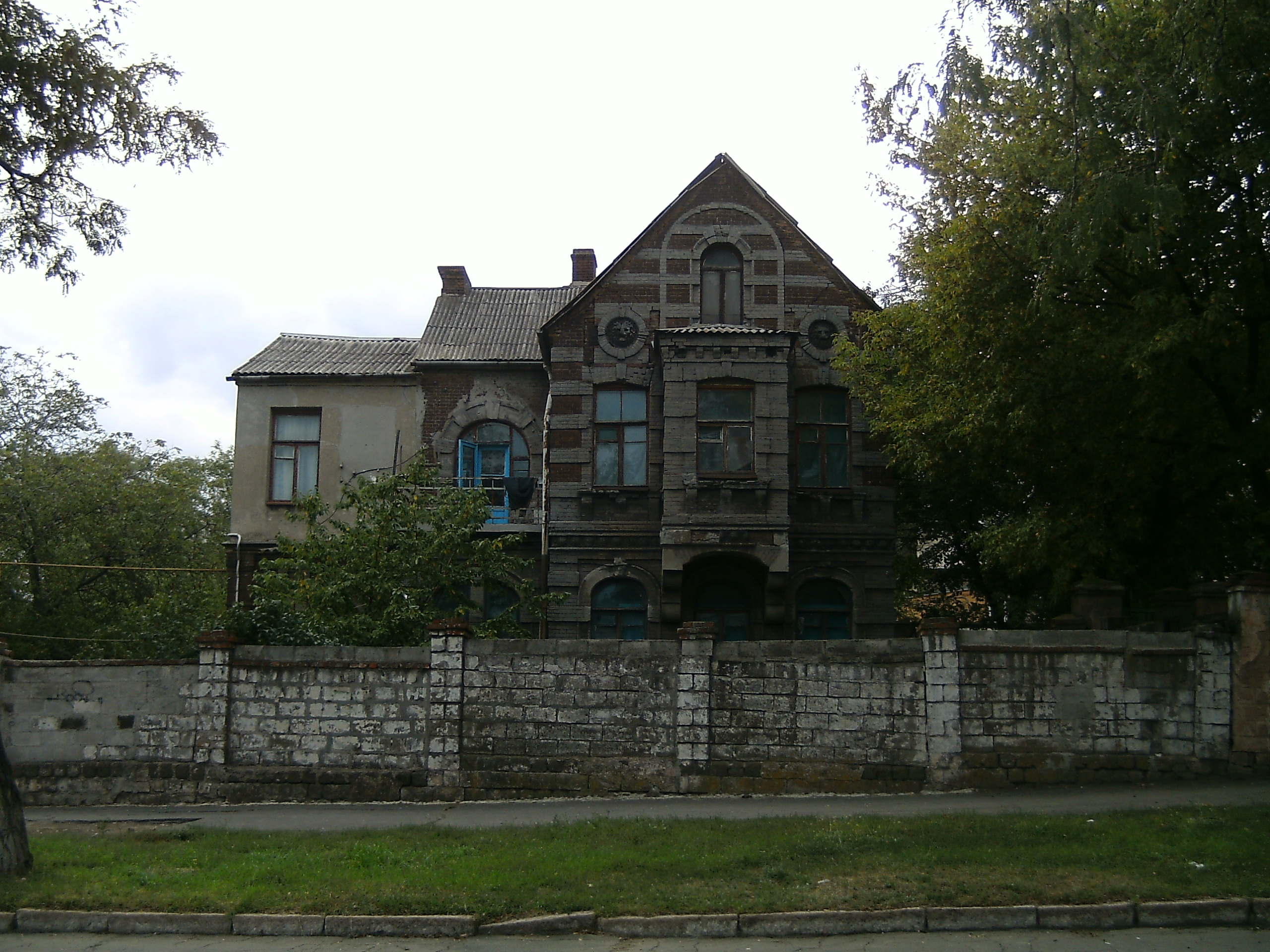
House of the Lions,

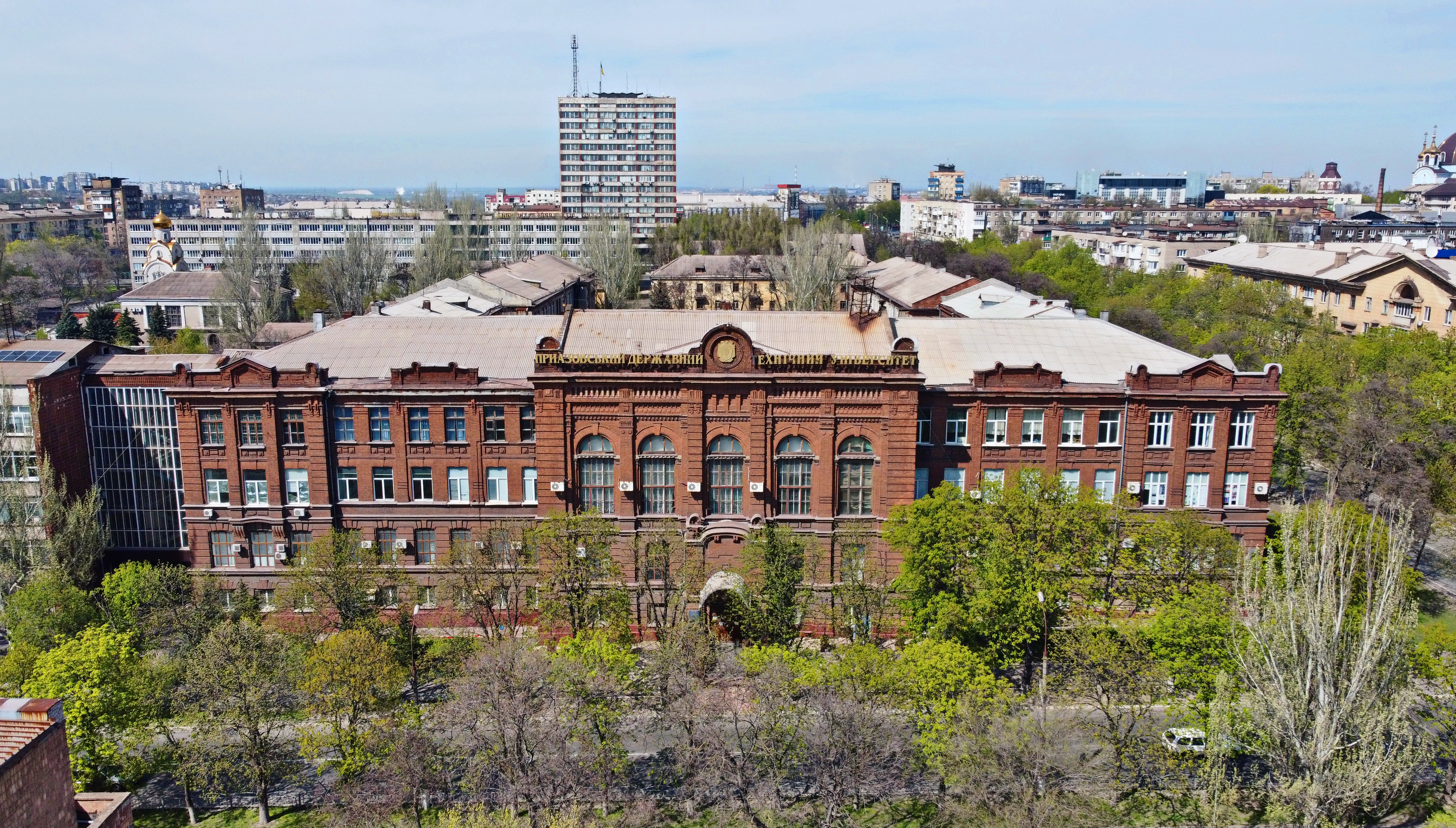
Pryazovskyi State Technical University,

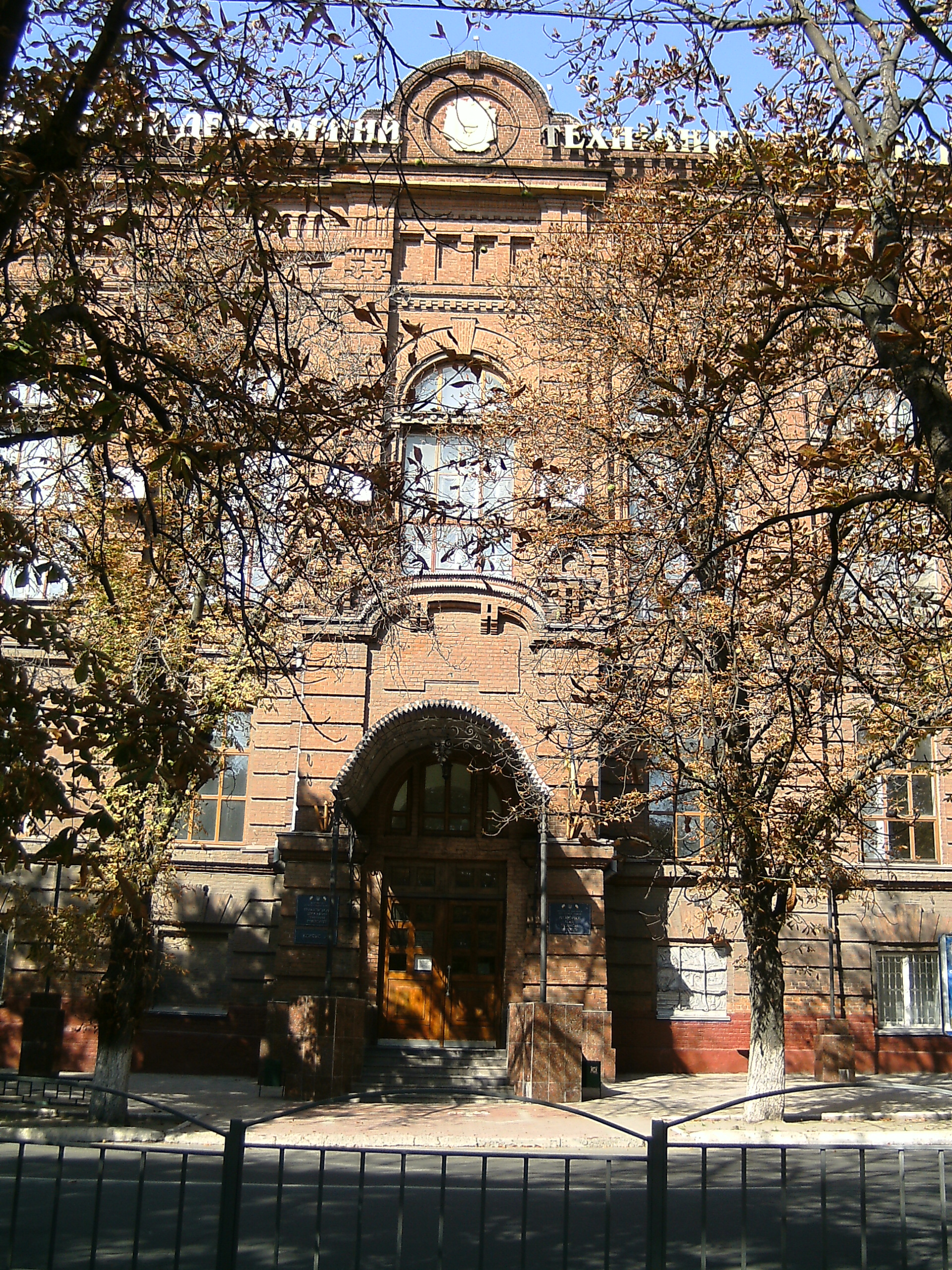
door of the Pryazovskyi State Technical University

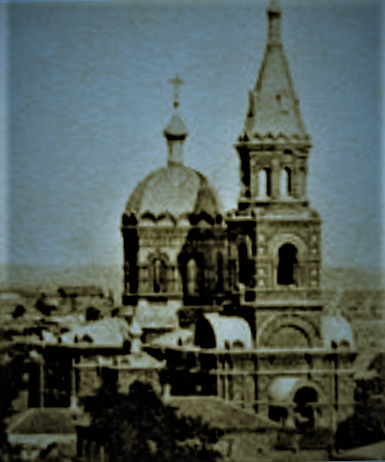
Saints Constantine and Helen Church (Mariupol)

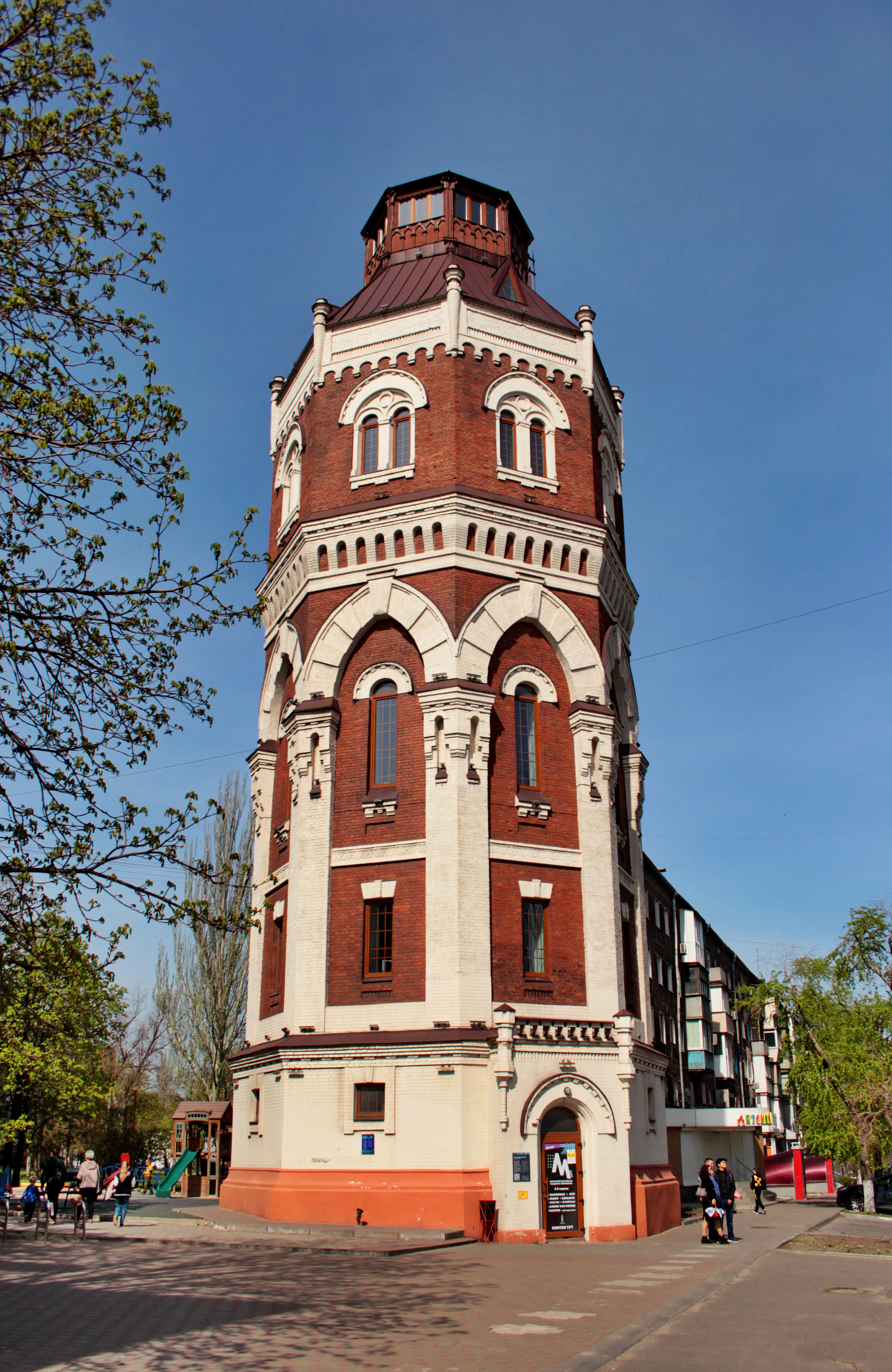
The Old tower
