= Battle of Izium =

Battle of the Russian invasion of Ukraine

Coordinates: 49°12′46″N 37°15′25″E

- Part of the eastern front of the Russian invasion of Ukraine
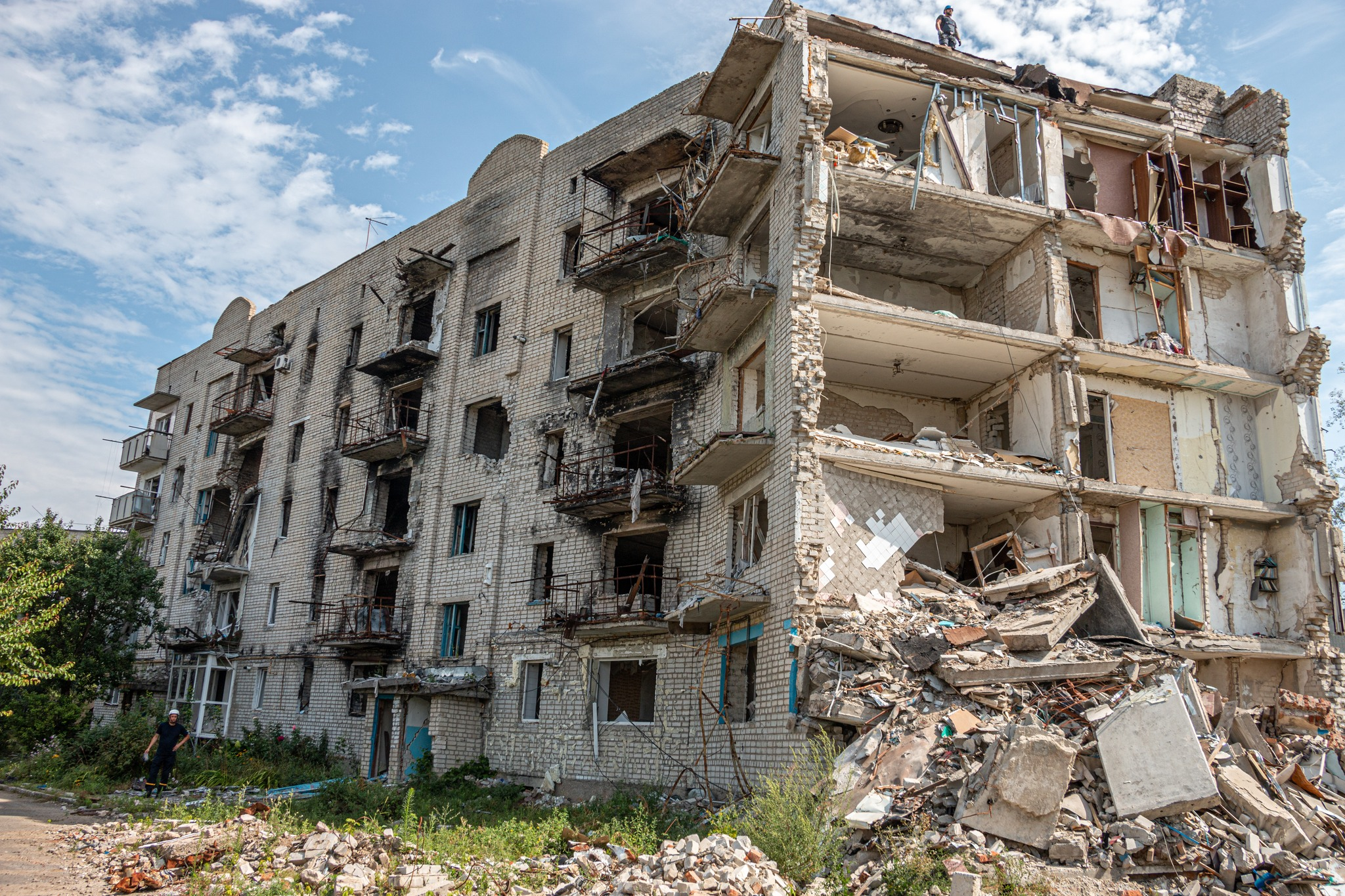
- An apartment block on Khlibozavodska street following the Russian occupation of Izium
Date	6 March – 1 April 2022 (4 weeks and 1 day)
Location	Izium, Kharkiv Oblast, Ukraine
Result	Russian victory

Belligerents
Russia	Ukraine

Commanders and leaders
	Ruslan Matushev; Vladyslav Tsyba

Units involved
26th Tank Regiment; 144th Guards Motor Rifle Division; 437th Training Regiment	90th Airmobile Battalion, 81st Airmobile Brigade; 122nd Territorial Defense Battalion, 113th Territorial Defense Brigade; Unit of the 3rd Separate Special Purpose Regiment

Strength
	~200 (6–13 March)

Casualties and losses
19+ killed, 46+ wounded 1 captured 1 Su-34 lost	30–35 killed and wounded (per Marushev); 50+ civilians killed

On the eastern front of the Russian invasion of Ukraine, a military engagement began in March 2022 between Russian and Ukrainian forces took place for control over the city of Izium, an important transportation node. The Russian military wanted to capture Izium so its forces in Kharkiv Oblast could link up with their troops in the Donbas region.

== Background ==
Russian attacks on Izium started from 28 February 2022, with "constant" rocket and air strikes by the Russian military beginning on 3 March. Eight civilians were killed on 3 March, with the city's central hospital reportedly sustaining significant damage.

On 5 March, the commander of the 90th Airmobile Battalion of Ukraine's 81st Airmobile Brigade ordered units of his battalion to advance to Izium, where an imminent Russian offensive was expected. Elements of the 90th Battalion, including the 1st Airmobile Company, arrived in Izium by the morning of 6 March.

== Battle ==
After arriving in Izium, units of the 90th Battalion were ordered to conduct reconnaissance in the northern part of the city. Elements of the 90th established contact with local territorial defence forces and Ukrainian special forces in Izium's northern outskirts and went on a joint reconnaissance patrol in the village of Hlynske, finding evidence that Russian forces had recently been in the area.

During this patrol, Russian vehicles began entering Hlynske from the nearby fields, and a Russian convoy began moving south down the E40 highway near the village. The Ukrainians forced the Russians to retreat with losses. This was the first Russian attempt to assault Izium, though there had been Russian reconnaissance activity in the area earlier. Simultaneously, other Ukrainian units destroyed a Russian tank near the city's concrete bridge over the Siverskyi Donets river, as the Russians were probing all routes into Izium.

Later on 6 March, the Russian military took control of Izium's railway station and two of the city's northern neighbourhoods, Honcharivka and Pisky.

Throughout the evening of 6 March, Ukrainian positions in central Izium were monitored by Russian drones and struck by Grad missiles. Overnight and into the next morning, Russian forces began a sustained bombardment of the city centre, striking the city hospital, a nearby church, the city administration building, the central square, schools in which Ukrainian forces had taken up positions, and the highway and other roads.

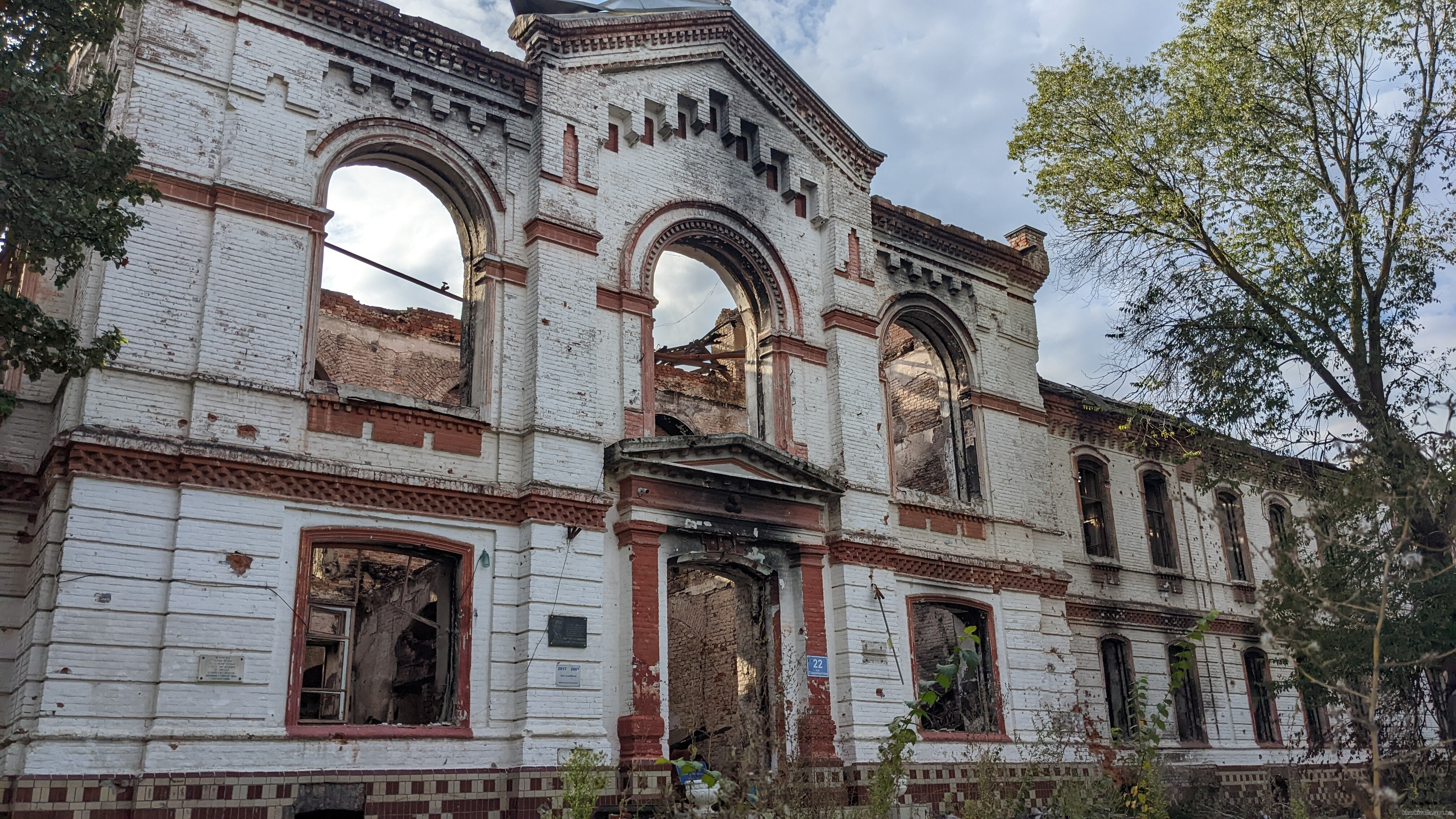
A historic school in central Izium damaged during the battle

On 7 March, combat took place near Izium's concrete bridge, and a nearby position held by the 90th Battalion's 1st Company and other units was destroyed. The 90th Battalion's commander ordered the units to destroy the bridge and retreat. Later on, fighting took place near the city's iron bridge, which was also ordered to be detonated to prevent Russian forces from crossing it. Thus, Ukrainian forces destroyed both of Izium's bridges over the Siverskyi Donets river. Later, Russian forces started attempting to cross at the city's pedestrian bridge, to storm the city centre, though they were struck by Ukrainian forces after crossing and eventually withdrew. While the pedestrian bridge had also been mined by the Ukrainians, it was impossible to detonate because the wiring had been damaged by shelling.

Heavy fighting continued throughout the day, involving Ukrainian special forces units, local territorial defence, the 1st Company and other 90th Battalion units. On 7 March, Russian troops entered the village of Kapytolivka was captured by Russian forces. Nearby villages also came under Russian control by this date. Kapytolivka was mostly captured by elements of the 488th Motor Rifle Regiment and the 856th Artillery Regiment, which are units of the 144th Motor Rifle Division of Russia's 20th Combined Arms Army.

The next morning, Ukrainian units in the city were informed that discussions were underway between the Russian and Ukrainian governments regarding "green corridors" for the evacuation of civilians, and that a ceasefire was supposed to be observed in Izium, though both sides exchanged fire. Evacuations took place between 09:00 and 11:00.

On 9 March, Ukrainian forces received information that Russian forces were attempted to lay pontoon bridges near the pedestrian bridge and the city beach, but after conducting reconnaissance found no evidence of any Russian attempts to deploy pontoon crossings over the river. However, the next day, the Russians assaulted the city from both the pedestrian bridge and the city beach, having breached the river in an area between two Ukrainian positions near the beach.

By 9 March, Russian Telegram channels had reported that Russian forces had broken through the Ukrainian defence in Izium, reaching the city's southern outskirts, and that Ukrainian forces had destroyed the city's bridges over the Siverskyi Donets in response. Between 9 and 10 March, 2,250 civilians were evacuated from Izium.

On 11 March, fierce fighting took place in Izium, with Russian forces assaulting the southern part of the city, according to a local official.

On 12 March, Russian troops captured "portions" of the northern part of Izium. The following day, the Ukrainian military claimed that Russian forces had launched an unsuccessful attack in the city.

On the evening of 12 March, with the Ukrainian forces in Izium under the threat of encirclement, the 90th Battalion completely withdrew from the city, to the villages of Kamyanka and Sukha Kamyanka. Units of the 95th Air Assault Brigade covered Izium's left flank to prevent the 90th Battalion from becoming completely encircled. During the remainder of March, the 90th Battalion and units of the 95th Brigade fought near Kamyanka. The next day, 13 March, the territorial defence battalion's commander ordered his forces to leave Izium, as they were surrounded and it no longer made sense to continue to defend the city. They were fired on by Russian forces during their withdrawal.

On the evening of 13 March, Russian forces established a pontoon crossing over the Siverskyi Donets at the village of Spivakivka and advanced towards Kamyanka, thus surrounding Izium. The next day, Ukrainian officials claimed that Ukrainian forces went on the counteroffensive and forced the Russian military to retreat from the villages of Topolske, Shpakivka, and Donetske. According to pro-Russian Telegram channels, fighting continued in the southern part of Izium, and Russian forces had managed to cross the Siverskyi Donets using pontoon bridges.

On 15 March, a unit of Ukraine's 25th Airborne Brigade, supported by a company of six tanks from the 3rd Tank Brigade, attempted to storm Topolske, which was under Russian control, from two sides. About two dozen Russian tanks were stationed the village; the commander of the 3rd Brigade later claimed that nine Russian tanks were destroyed during the battle. The Ukrainians failed to retake the village.

According to Austrian military expert Tom Cooper, Ukrainian forces retook the southern side of Izium between 15 and 16 March.

On 17 March, a local official said that Russian forces had crossed the Siverskyi Donets river near the highway to Barvinkove, but had been "completely destroyed" near the Izium fish farm. Meanwhile, pro-Russian Telegram channels reportedly claimed that Russian forces had entered the village of Kamyanka, south of Izium, thus cutting off the Ukrainian garrison in Izium from food and supplies. On the same day, the Ukrainian military claimed to have stopped a Russian column as it was moving in the direction of Kamyanka. It was said that the column consisted of military vehicles belonging to the 26th Tank Regiment's battalion tactical group, as well as the 437th Training Regiment. Cooper claimed that Russia's 144th Motor Rifle Division was part of an unsuccessful attempt to recapture the southern part of Izium on 17 March.

A US DoD official reportedly stated on 17 March that Izium had been captured by Russian forces; according to the Institute for the Study of War, "either the statement itself or media reporting was incorrect".

Fighting continued on 18 March. The Ukrainian military reported that Russian forces were deploying additional units and supplies to Izium.

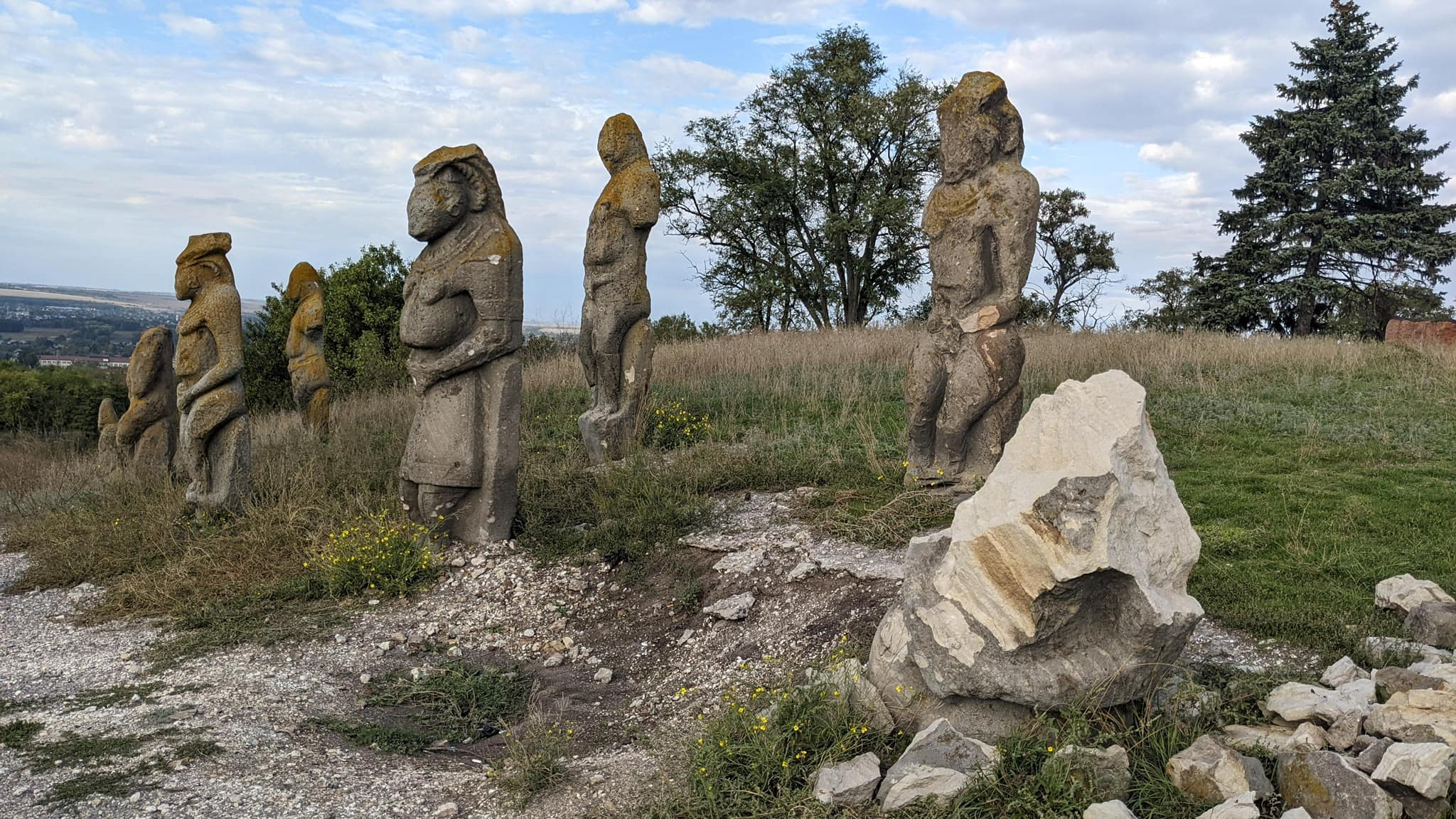
Polovtsian "babas" (statues) on Mount Kremenets near Izium damaged by Russian shelling

Between 19 and 20 March, a new Russian attempt to capture the centre of Izium was repelled. During the fighting, Russian engineering troops attempted to make a pontoon bridge over the Donets river, so to bypass two vehicle bridges that were partially destroyed by Ukrainian forces in an attempt to halt the Russian advance. However, the engineering troops were ambushed and 19 Russian soldiers were killed and 46 wounded. Among the dead was the commander of the engineering unit, Colonel Nikolay Ovcharenko, variously described in sources as a member of the 1st Guards Tank Army or the 45th Engineer Regiment. Eventually, Russian forces managed to erect two pontoon bridges and Russian tanks crossed the river to encircle the Ukrainian-held part of Izium. During this time, on 22 March, Ukrainian forces made an attempted counterattack to regain control of the city.

On 24 March, the Russian military announced that it had taken full control of Izium, which was denied by Ukraine which stated that fighting was still ongoing. According to a local official, Russian forces were holding the northern part of the city, while Ukrainian soldiers were in the south, with the Donets river separating them. He also confirmed that Izium was blockaded and that the city had been "completely destroyed" by this point.

On 25 March, it was reported by a US DoD official and others that Russian forces broke through Ukrainian lines to the south of Izium, reportedly advancing 10 kilometres. However, the ISW cited the Ukrainian military that the Russian troops were repelled at the village of Kamyanka, just south of Izium. The ISW further stated that Russian forces were going to continue with their attempts to encircle the city, after failing to capture it in a direct assault.

By 27 March, the Russian military captured Kamyanka, Topolske, and Sukha Kamyanka, all south of Izium, but Ukrainian forces claimed that they managed to subsequently recapture all three villages. They also claimed to have shot down a Russian Sukhoi Su-34 fighter aircraft near Izium. Two days later, it was confirmed Kamyanka was under Russian control, with Russian forces fortifying their positions around it, while the fighting moved south of Izium, along the road to Sloviansk.

On 1 April, the Ukrainian military confirmed Izium was under Russian control. The following day, in an interview for Ukrinform, Izium's Deputy Mayor Volodymyr Matsokin claimed that 80% of the city's residential buildings had been destroyed and that there was no power, heating, or water in the city.

== Aftermath and Ukrainian counterattacks ==
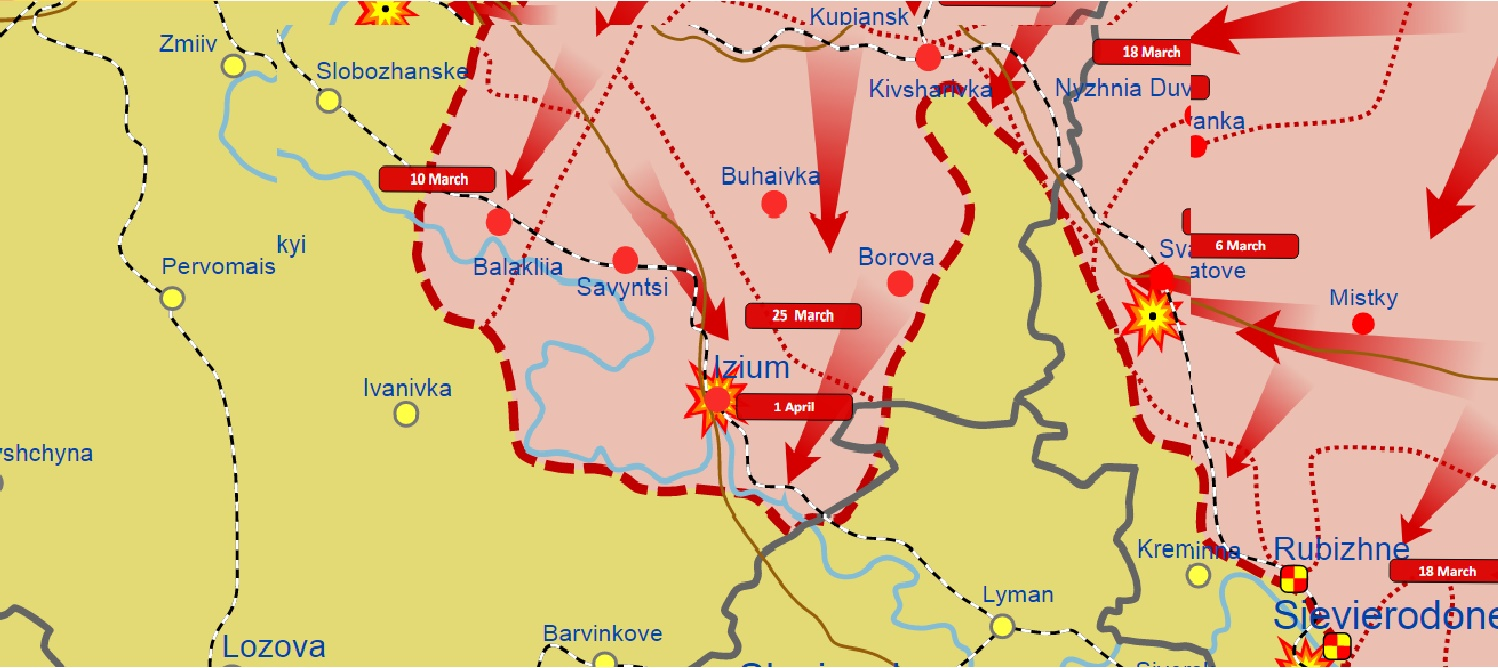
Russian advance as of early April 2022

On 3 April 2022, the Ukrainian government stated that two Russian soldiers were killed and 28 others hospitalised after Ukrainian civilians handed out poisoned cakes to Russian soldiers of the Russian 3rd Motor Rifle Division in Izium.

On 4 April, The Guardian reported, based on eyewitness reports by residents and military officials, that intense fighting continued close to Izium.

On 10 April, several US defence officials stated that Russian forces were massing in Izium in preparation for an offensive campaign between Izium and Dnipro. Russian forces had been reportedly redeploying forces from the Kyiv axis and the Sumy axis to Izium from 5 April.

On 11 April, Russian forces launched an attack against Dovhenke and Dmytrivka, which was repelled by Ukrainian forces.

On 18 April, Ukraine claimed the recapture of a "number of settlements" in or near the Izium area. Russian forces in the city were beginning mass deportations of city residents towards the territory of the Russian Federation.

Following the start of a new Russian offensive mid-April 2022, Russian troops had some success through localised advances south and southwest of Izium on 20 April. As of 26 April, Russian forces continued to make slow progress south of Izium, while the following day, the Russian military captured Zavody west of Izium, as well as the outskirts of Velyka Komyshuvakha, 20 kilometres west of the city.

On 27 April 2022, Ukrainian publication Defense Express claimed that Valery Gerasimov the Chief of General Staff of the Russian Army arrived in Izium to personally command the Russian offensive in the region. According to the Ukrainian Independent Information Agency, Gerasimov was wounded on 1 May 2022 near Izium. Two US officials confirmed Gerasimov had been in the region but a Ukrainian official denied Ukraine was specifically targeting Gerasimov and said that when the command post was attacked, with 200 Russian soldiers being killed, Gerasimov had already set off to return to Russia. 30 armoured vehicles, including tanks, were also claimed to be destroyed. Ukrainian officials claimed the attack killed Russian General Andrei Simonov.

By 4 June, the Ukrainians claimed to have largely destroyed the 35th Combined Arms Army in heavy fighting south of Izium. According to CIT analyst Kyrylo Mykhailov, out of 1,500–2,000 infantrymen in its two brigades, only 100–200 were left. In the same report, however, he stated that the Russians had assembled 20 BTGs, of 400–600 troops each, south of the city for a possible offensive. According to independent Russian sources, the entirety of the army had not yet been transferred from its headquarters in the Far East, and it represented an incomplete corps with just two full motorised brigades forming the main strike force. The soldiers were also "forced" to fight in the woods, a situation which was compared to the Battle of the Hürtgen Forest. Thus, according to the report, by early June the numbers of combat-ready infantry in certain motorised brigade battalions of the army successfully reached 12–15 people (64th brigade), the combined number of 38th and 64th motorised brigades – less than 100 of truly combat-ready infantry in each brigade.

On 25 June, the Ukrainians claimed that they had carried out a strike using the HIMARS. Ukrainian military said that during this strike over 40 soldiers were killed, including Colonel Andrei Vasilyev. The strike occurred on a Russian military base near Izium. Russia acknowledges the attack but says it hit a hospital and killed two civilians.

In July, several calls were intercepted by the Ukrainians between several Russian soldiers near Izium and their family members, to whom they described the combat conditions. One soldier claimed that out of 90 troops in his company, just 26 were left. Another claimed that his unit had suffered over 20 men killed and 100 wounded in one engagement, and just 20 remained. A third claimed that out of 107 men in his company, just 10 were still alive, and that four of the survivors had deserted. He also said that he was the only one left from his platoon of 22 men.

On 12 August, citing a report from Radio Free Europe/Radio Liberty, the Institute for the Study of War concluded that the 64th Separate Guards Motor Rifle Brigade had likely been destroyed as "part of an intentional Kremlin effort to conceal war crimes it committed in Kyiv Oblast." The report went further stating that of the 1,500 members of the brigade, losses were placed at 200–300 likely killed during fighting at Izium and Sloviansk, and that the unit "largely ceased to exist."

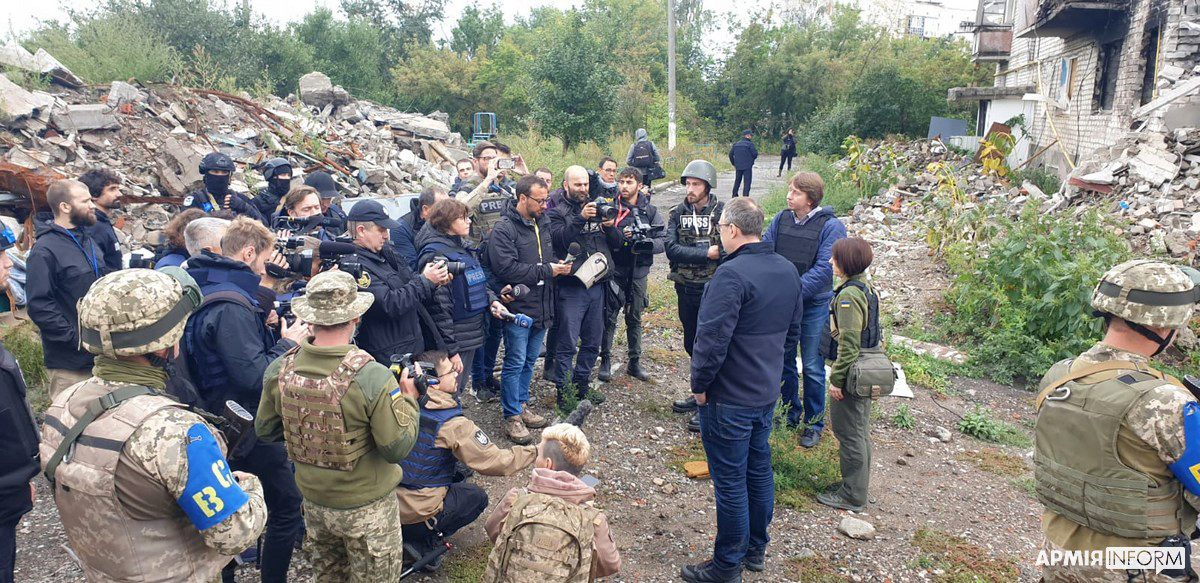
Ukrainian soldiers and journalists in Izium after the city's liberation from Russian occupation

Ukraine began a counteroffensive in the Kharkiv region in early September 2022. On 9 September, the suburbs of Oskil and Kapytolivka were recaptured by the Ukrainian military. By the morning of 10 September, Russian forces, leaving their equipment, had withdrawn from the city which was now again under control of Ukrainian forces. and local mass graves with 440 bodies were found. Izium's population decreased to just 10,000 due to the war.

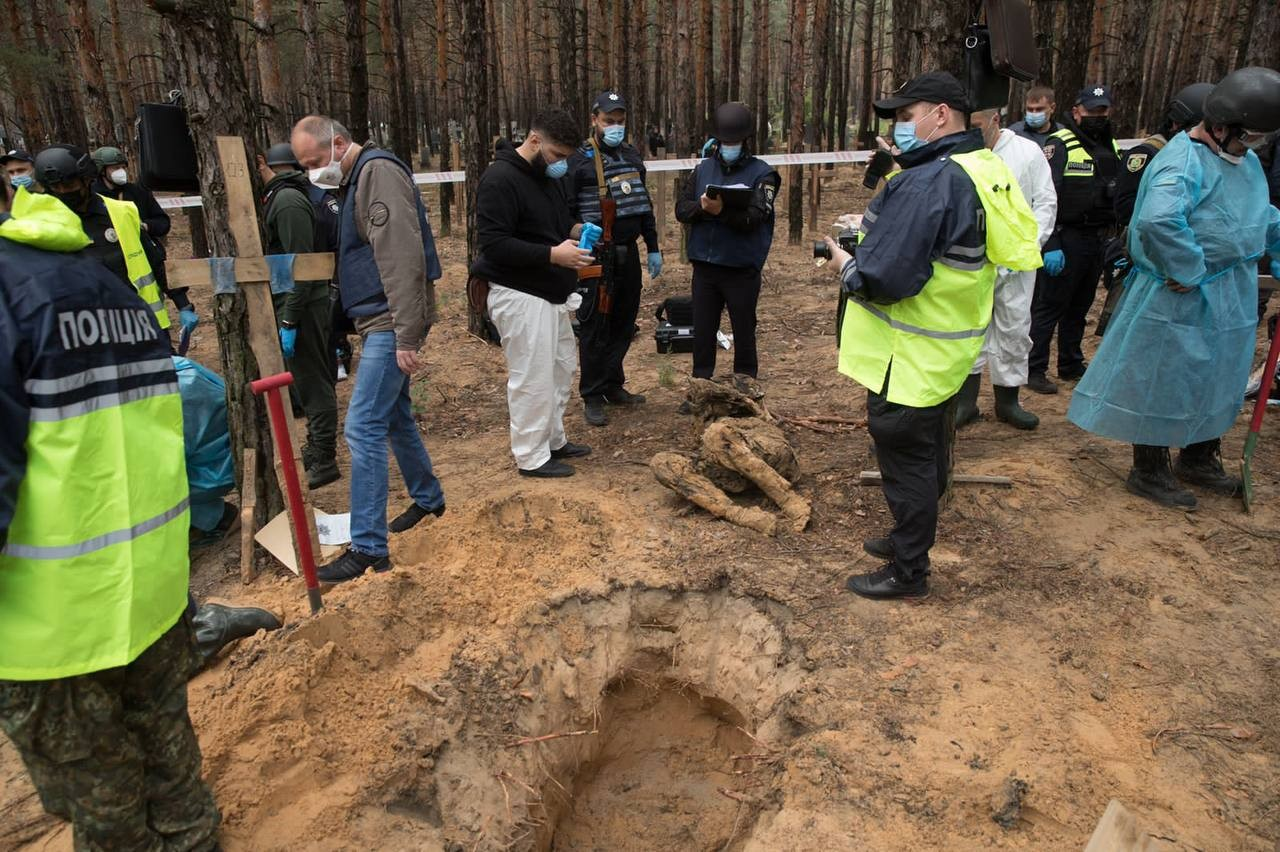
Exhumation of the bodies from the mass graves

== Civilian casualties ==
Mass graves with more than 440 bodies were found after the Russians were driven out of the city.

In late November 2022, a phone call from a Russian soldier in the 27th Separate Guards Motor Rifle Brigade discussing killing of Izium's citizens during the September retreat was leaked. The soldier detailed a secondhand account of where his commanding officer Colonel Sergey Igorevich Safonov and another officer had stabbed an elderly Ukrainian woman and shot her husband respectively, killing both.
