= Donetske =

Donetske (Ukrainian: Донецьке) may refer to the following places in Ukraine:

- Donetske, Donetsk Oblast, urban-type settlement in Kramatorsk Raion
- Donetske, Kharkiv Oblast, village in Izium Raion

.
