= 47th Guards Tank Division =

Tank division of the Russian Ground Forces

47th Guards Tank Division (1965–1997) 26th Guards Tank Division (1957–1965) 19th Guards Mechanized Division (1945–1957) 47th Guards Rifle Division (1942–1945)
- 47-я гвардейская танковая Нижнеднепровская Краснознамённая, ордена Богдана Хмельницкого дивизия
- Active: Soviet Union (1942–1991); Russia (1991–1997)
- Branch: Russian Ground Forces
- Type: Infantry (later Armor)
- Part of: Moscow Military District; 1st Guards Tank Army
- Engagements: World War II
- Decorations: Order of the Red Banner; Order of Bogdan Khmelnitsky 2nd class
- Battle honours: Lower Dnieper

Commanders
- Notable commanders: Fyodor Ostashenko; Sergey Bobruk; Sobir Rakhimov; Vasily Shugayev

The 47th Guards Nizhnedneprovskaya Red Banner Order of Bogdan Khmelnitsky Tank Division (Russian: 47-я гвардейская танковая Нижнеднепровская Краснознамённая, ордена Богдана Хмельницкого дивизия, romanized: 47-ya gvardeyskaya tankovaya Nizhnedneprovskaya Krasnoznamonnaya, ordena Bogdana Khmel'nitskogo diviziya), was a tank division of the Soviet Armed Forces, later Russian Ground Forces.

It was formed in October 1942, during World War II from the first formation of the 154th Rifle Division as the 47th Guards Rifle Division. It served with the 8th Guards Army from late 1943. In late 1945, the division was converted into the 19th Guards Mechanized Division as part of the Group of Soviet Occupation Forces in Germany. It was ultimately relocated to Hillersleben as part of the 3rd Shock Army (later the 3rd Army) and served there with the Group of Soviet Forces in Germany for the rest of the Cold War, being converted to the 26th Guards Tank Division in 1957 and renumbered to restore its original number in 1965.

== World War II ==
The 47th Guards Rifle Division was formed on 20 October 1942 by the conversion of the first formation of the 154th Rifle Division for the latter's "courage and heroism" during the Kozelsk Offensive. It included the 437th, 473rd, and 510th Rifle Regiments, the 571st Artillery Regiment, and smaller units. The commander of the 154th, Major General Yakov Fokanov, continued in command of the 47th Guards. The division's units received Guards designations on 26 December, with the rifle regiments becoming the 137th, 140th, and 142nd Guards, while the artillery regiment became the 99th Guards.

On February 13, 1944, by Order No. 28, the honorary name "Nizhnedneprovskaya"- was granted to the division by the order of the Supreme Commander-in-Chief.

== Postwar ==
In late May 1945, the division with the 8th Guards Army became part of the newly created Group of Soviet Occupation Forces in Germany (renamed the Group of Soviet Forces in Germany (GSFG) in 1954). In late 1945, the 47th Guards Rifle Division was converted into the 19th Guards Mechanized Division. The latter included three mechanized regiments and two tank regiments: the 62nd, 63rd, and 64th Guards Mechanized Regiments, formed from the 137th, 140th, and 142nd Guards Rifle Regiments, and the 26th and 153rd Tank Regiments, the former 244th Separate Tank Regiment and 153rd Tank Brigade, respectively. It was subsequently transferred to the 3rd Shock Army (the 3rd Army from 1954) in 1947, joining the 79th Rifle Corps. The corps was renumbered as the 23rd in 1955 and disbanded a year later, leaving the division directly subordinated to the army headquarters. On 17 May 1957, the division was converted into the 26th Guards Tank Division. The 63rd and 64th Guards Mechanized Regiments were accordingly disbanded, while the 62nd Guards became the 245th Guards Motor Rifle Regiment. To replace the disbanded units, the 49th Guards Tank Regiment was transferred to the 26th Guards from the 12th Guards Tank Division.

The division was renumbered as the 47th Guards to restore its World War II designation on 11 January 1965. The 49th Guards was subsequently renumbered as the 197th Guards in addition. As the Cold War ended, the GSFG was reduced in size and renamed the Western Group of Forces. Following the Dissolution of the Soviet Union at the end of 1991, the division became part of the Russian Ground Forces. In April 1993, the division began its withdrawal to Mulino, Nizhny Novgorod Oblast, in the Moscow Military District.

In 1995 in the village of Shatoy during the First Chechen War, a checkpoint of the division's 245th Motorized Rifle Regiment was captured by Chechen fighters. Aleksey Pulikovsky, an officer of the Ground Forces, and the eldest son of General-Lieutenant Konstantin Pulikovsky, died while unblocking the checkpoint on 14 December 1995.

The division was disbanded by merging it with the 31st Tank Division of the Moscow Military District into the 3rd Motor Rifle Division at Nizhny Novgorod in 1997.

== Composition in 1988 ==
- Divisional HQ (1 PRP-3, 1 R-145BM, 1 R-156 BTR)
- 26th Tank Regiment (95 T-64, 12 BMP-2, 41 BMP-1, 2 BRM-1K, 1 BTR-70, 1 BTR-60, 18 2S1 Gvozdika, 6 2S12 Sani)
- 153rd Tank Regiment (96 T-64, 44 BMP-2, 10 BMP-1, 2 BRM-1K, 1 BTR-70, 1 BTR-60, 18 2S1 Gvozdika, 6 2S12 Sani)
- 197th Guards Tank Regiment (94 T-64, 12 BMP-2, 42 BMP-1, 2 BRM-1K, 18 2S1 Gvozdika, 6 2S12 Sani)
- 245th Guards Motorized Rifle Regiment (27 T-64A, 46 BMP-2, 39 BMP-1, 2 BRM-1K, 2 BTR-60, 18 2S1 Gvozdika, 6 2S12 Sani)
- 99th Guards Self-Propelled Artillery Regiment (36 2S3 Akatsia, 18 BM-21 Grad, 3 PRP-3)
- 1009th Anti-Aircraft Missile Regiment (9K33 Osa SAM)
- 7th Separate Reconnaissance Battalion (6 T-64, 10 BMP-1, 7 BRM-1K, 2 BTR-70, 3 BTR-60)
- 73rd Separate Guards Signal Battalion (8 R-145BM, R-137B, 1 R-2AM)
- 52nd Separate Engineer Battalion (1 IMR-2, 3 UR-67)
- 1077th Separate Transport Battalion
- 65th Separate Repair and Maintenance Battalion
- 63rd Separate Medical Battalion

Total: 322 tanks, 271 infantry fighting vehicles, 14 armored personnel carriers, 108 self-propelled guns, 30 mortars, 18 MLRS.
