= Izium mass graves =

Mass graves found near Izium during the Russian invasion of Ukraine

Coordinates: 49°12′46″N 37°15′25″E

- Part of War crimes in the Russian invasion of Ukraine; Battle of Izium; 2022 Kharkiv counteroffensive
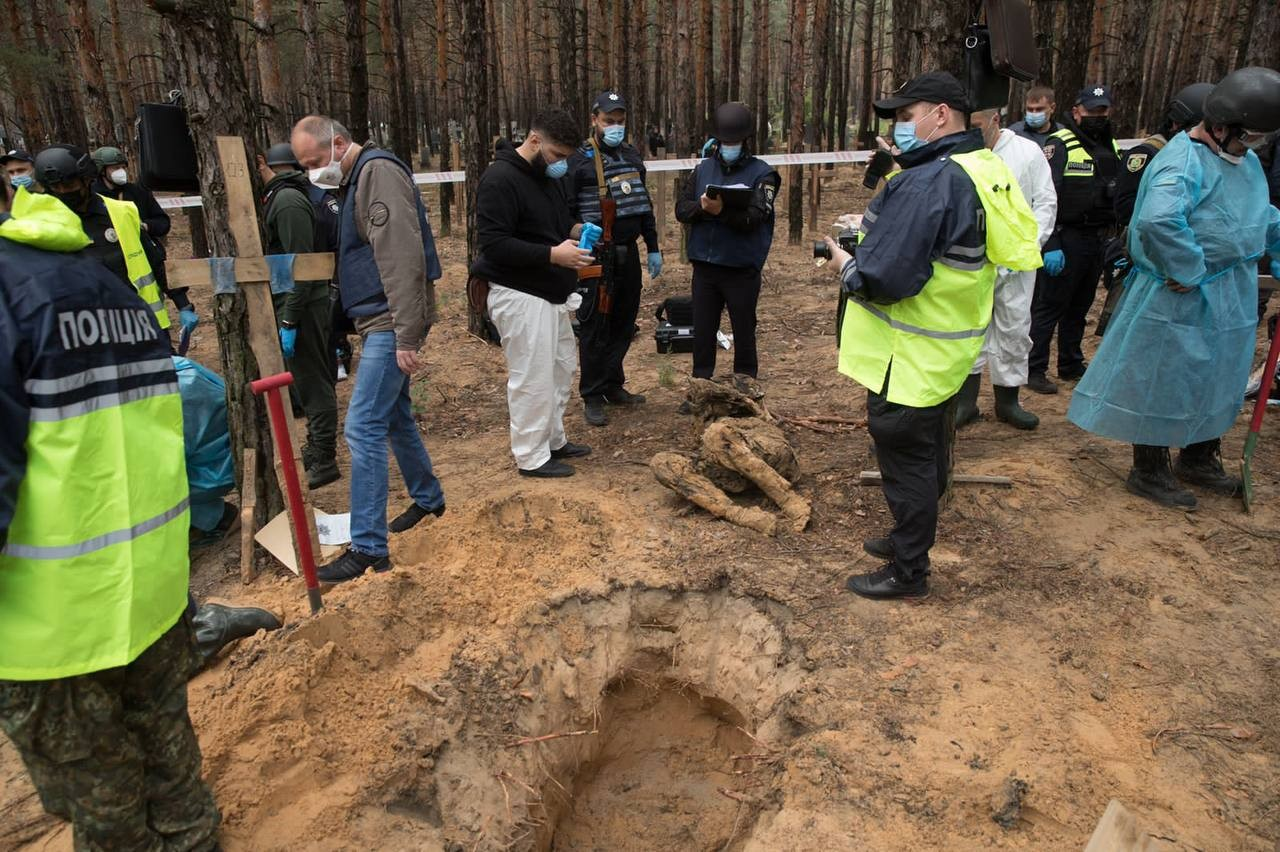
- Exhumation of the bodies, 16 September 2022
- Location: Izium, Kharkiv Oblast
- Attack type: War crimes, including torture and execution
- Victim: At least 440 people
- Perpetrator: Russian Ground Forces

On 15 September 2022, several mass graves, including one site containing at least 440 bodies, were found in woods near the Ukrainian city of Izium after it was recaptured by Ukrainian forces during the Russian invasion of Ukraine. The graves contained bodies of people who were killed by Russian forces. The Ukrainian government believes that over 1,000 civilian residents were killed during the battle for and subsequent Russian occupation of Izium.

According to Ukrainian investigators, 447 bodies were discovered in one of the sites including 414 bodies of civilians (215 women, 194 men, 5 children) and 22 servicemen. Most of the dead showed signs of violent death and 30 presented traces of torture and summary execution, including ropes around their necks, bound hands, broken limbs and genital amputation; others might have died from shelling and a lack of access to healthcare.

On 26 September, Ukrainian President Volodymyr Zelenskyy said that two more mass graves had been found "with hundreds of people".

== Background ==
Izium, Kharkiv oblast

After the Russian invasion of Ukraine began on 24 February 2022, the battle for control of the town of Izium began in March 2022, due to the town's importance as a transportation node. The Russian military wanted to capture Izium so its forces in the Kharkiv Oblast could link up with their troops in the Donbas region. On 1 April, the Ukrainian military confirmed Izium was under Russian control.

Following the launch of the Kherson counteroffensive in late August, Ukrainian forces began a simultaneous counteroffensive in early September in Kharkiv Oblast, in the northeast of the country. Following an unexpected thrust deep into Russian lines, Ukraine recovered many hundreds of square kilometers of territory by 9 September. On 10 September 2022 Ukrainian forces recaptured the town during the 2022 Kharkiv counteroffensive.

== Reports ==
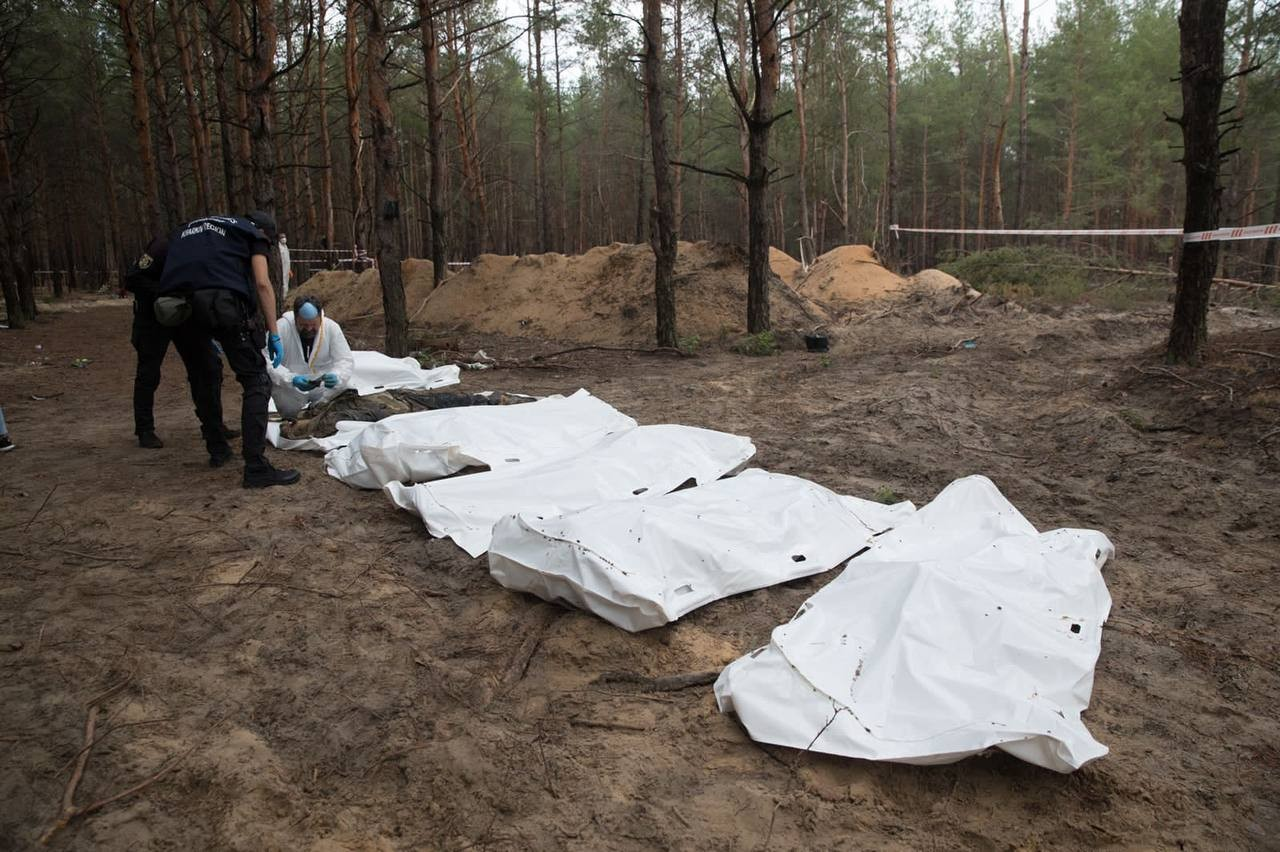
Cemetery in Izium made during Russian occupation

On 15 September 2022, after Russian forces were driven out of the city in the Kharkiv counteroffensive, a large number of mostly unmarked graves was found in the woods close to Izium. Amid the trees were hundreds of graves with simple wooden crosses, most of them marked only with numbers, whilst one of the larger graves bore a marker saying it contained the bodies of at least 17 Ukrainian soldiers. By 16 September, investigators had discovered more than 445 graves of both civilians and soldiers, with some of the identification and location of the sites helped by the head of the local funeral home, who had been instructed by occupying forces to mark the graves only with numbers and record both the number and individuals names in a journal.

Local firefighters were enlisted to help recover the human remains at the site, with one stating that after they unearth the body a moment of silence is held before the remains are quickly investigated for identifying characteristics or items. They are then placed in a bag and transported to a morgue for more detailed forensics.

A minority of the casualties were caused by artillery fire and from lack of healthcare. According to the authorities some of the bodies had their hands tied behind their back and showed signs of torture. Oleh Synyehubov, governor of Kharkiv region said:

"Among the bodies that were exhumed today, 99 per cent showed signs of violent death. There are several bodies with their hands tied behind their backs, and one person is buried with a rope around his neck. Obviously, these people were tortured and executed. There are also children among the buried."

Residents who survived the occupation stated that the Russians targeted specific individuals and that they already had lists of those locals who were in the military, the families of military people, or the people who were veterans of the war in Donbas that occurred between 2014 and 2022. They also said that in selecting victims they would terrorize the townspeople by publicly strip searching them. Tamara Volodymyrivna claimed that she had been allowed to bury territorial defense members and some soldiers, but the majority of Ukrainian soldier casualties she was not allowed to bury and did not know where the bodies were located.

== Investigation ==
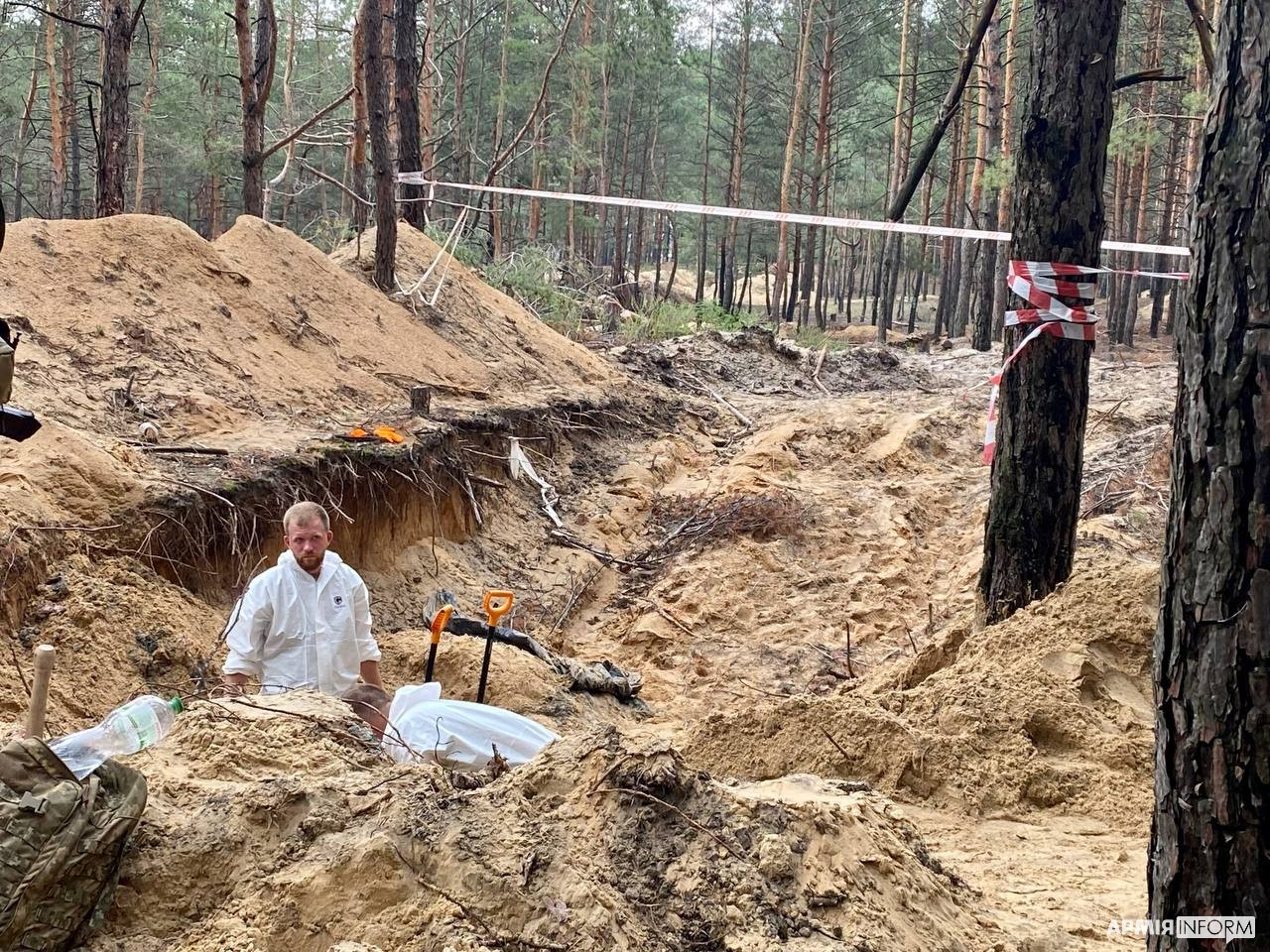
Cemetery in Izium investigation after Russian occupation

The United Nations responded by stating they plan to send monitors to Izium. Ultimately, the investigations were supported by ICC experts.

According to Ukrainian investigators, 447 bodies were discovered: 414 bodies of civilians (215 women, 194 men, 5 children), 22 servicemen, and 11 bodies whose gender had not yet been determined as of 23 September. Most of the dead showed signs of violent death and 30 presented traces of torture and summary execution, including ropes around their necks, bound hands, broken limbs and genital amputation.

== Reactions ==
Ukrainian President Volodymyr Zelenskyy likened the discovery to the Bucha massacre as officials began forensic investigations. Individuals working the scene have been overcome with the process and emotions, with one telling reporters he believes they will need mental health help in the future as the work will stay with them forever.

Russia responded with a mass disinformation campaign on using pro-Russian accounts in Western social media aimed at discrediting the findings as a "Western fabrication", or claiming that the killed civilians were actually Ukrainian soldiers. When asked by reporters about Zelenskyy's claims, Kremlin spokesman Dmitry Peskov claimed both the Izium and Bucha massacres are "lies".

The Spanish Ministry of Foreign Affairs in an official statement condemned the massacre, and called for respect for international humanitarian law and the investigation of the crimes committed. French president Emmanuel Macron condemned Izium atrocities committed under Russian occupation. John Kirby, of the White House National Security Council, said that "unfortunately, this matches the deprivation and brutality that the Russian Armed Forces are leading the war against Ukraine and the Ukrainian nation."

Cardinal Konrad Krajewski traveled from Zaporizhzhia where he had been delivering humanitarian aid, to join Bishop Pavlo Honcharuk of the Kharkiv-Zaporizhzhia Diocese to offer prayers for the deceased and the workers.

== See also ==
- Bucha massacre
- Claims of genocide of Ukrainians in the 2022 Russian invasion of Ukraine
- War crimes in the Russian invasion of Ukraine
- List of massacres in Ukraine
