= 3rd Motor Rifle Division =

Russian Ground Forces formation

- 3-я мотострелковая Висленская Краснознамённая, орденов Суворова и Кутузова дивизия
- Shoulder Sleeve Patch
- Active: 1997–2009, 2016–present
- Country: Russia
- Branch: Russian Ground Forces
- Type: Mechanized infantry
- Size: Division
- Part of: 22nd Guards Army (1997–2009); 20th Guards Combined Arms Army (2016–present)
- Garrison/HQ: Nizhny Novgorod (1997–2009); Valuyki, Belgorod Oblast (2016–present)
- Engagements: Russian invasion of Ukraine
- Decorations: Order of the Red Banner; Order of Kutuzov, 2nd Class; Order of Suvorov, 2nd Class
- Battle honours: Vislenskaya

Commanders
- Current commander: Major General Aleksei Vyacheslavovich Avdeyev

The 3rd Vislenskaya Red Banner Order of Suvorov and Kutuzov Motor Rifle Division (Russian: 3-я мотострелковая Висленская Краснознамённая, орденов Суворова и Кутузова дивизия, romanized: 3-ya motostrelkovaya Vislenskaya Krasnoznamonnaya, ordenov Suvorova i Kutuzova diviziya), is a motorized infantry division of the Russian Ground Forces.

The 3rd Motor Rifle Division was formed in 1997 from the amalgamation of the 31st and 47th Guards Tank Divisions of the Moscow Military District in Nizhny Novgorod, and existed until March 2009, when the division was disbanded and split into the 6th Separate Tank Brigade and the 9th Separate Motor Rifle Brigade. The 3rd Motor Rifle Division was reformed in 2016 and based in the town of Valuyki, Belgorod Oblast, as part of the 20th Guards Army in the Western Military District, later Moscow Military District.

== History ==
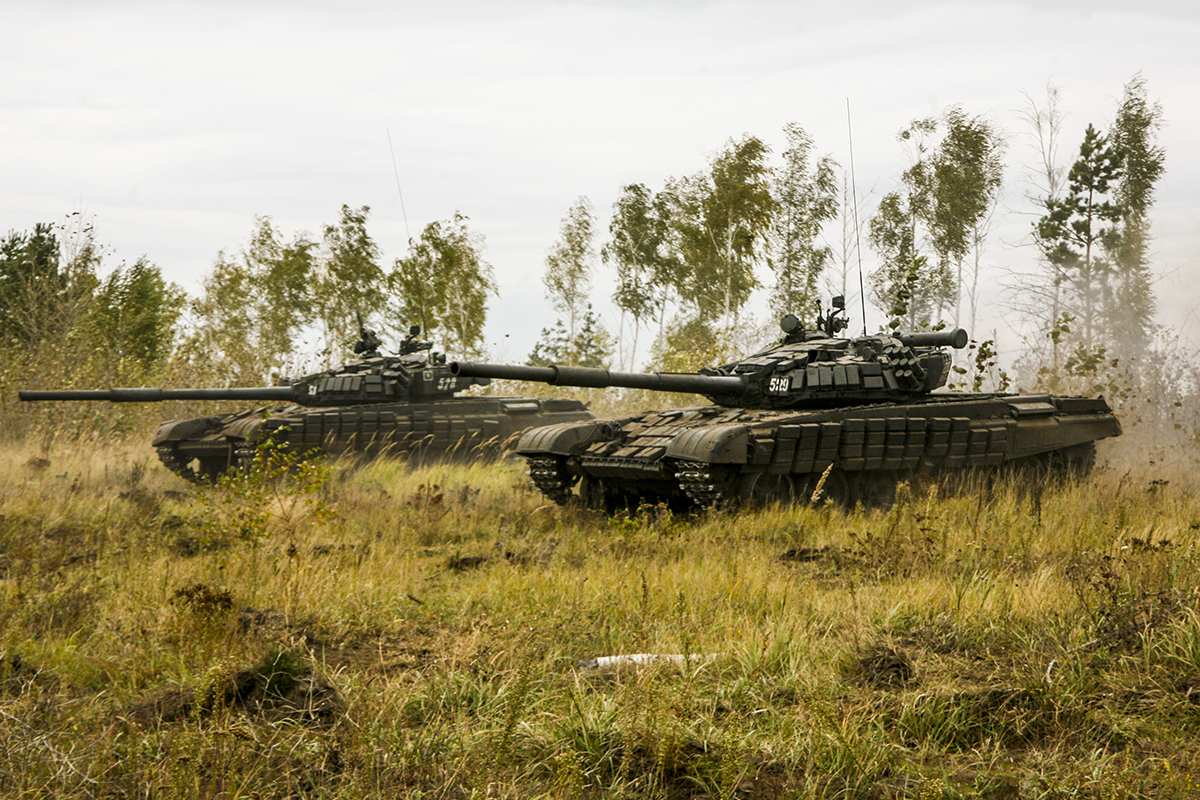
T-72B tanks of the 3rd Motor Rifle Division at the Pogonovo proving grounds in Voronezh Oblast, 2017.

The division formed as 3rd 'Vislenskaya (Russian for Vistula) Red Banner Orders of Suvorov and Kutuzov' Motor Rifle Division by amalgamation of 31st and 47th Guards Tank Divisions at Novy in the Moscow Military District on 1 July 1997 gaining the honours of the 31st Tank Division. The Division was in 2004 under the command of General Major Aleksandr Konnov. Elements of the division, notably the two motor rifle regiments, participated in the First Chechen War and Second Chechen War.

Warfare.ru notes that 3rd MRD was unit number 54046, and had constant readiness status. In 2000 the division had 10,850 personnel, 244 T-80 tanks, 361 BMP/BTR, 36 2S19 Msta-S, 96 2S3 Akatsiya, and 16 Grad multiple rocket launchers. It consisted of the 100th and 237th Tank Regiments, and the 245th and 752nd Motor Rifle Regiments, as well as the 99th Self-Propelled Artillery Regiment.

In March 2009 the division was disbanded and reorganised as the 6th Separate Tank Brigade and the 9th Separate Motor Rifle Brigade. V/Ch 54046 became the 9th Separate Motorized Rifle Visla Red Banner Order of Suvorov Brigade.

In 2016, the 9th Motor Rifle Brigade moved to Boguchar. Its transition to the west wasn't easy. The 9th will become the new, reformed 3rd MRD, as announced on 21 October 2016, by Defense Minister Sergey Shoygu.

In 2022, the division took part in the Russian invasion of Ukraine. Colonel Igor Yevgenyevich Nikolaev, the commander of the division's 252nd Guards Motor Rifle Regiment, was killed in the Kharkiv Oblast on 15 March 2022. In April 2022, Ukrainian officials claimed that the division's troops had to be treated for eating poisoned meals distributed to them by Ukrainian civilians in Izium.

According to the Institute for the Study of War, the 3rd Motor Rifle Division had been active on the Lyman front from at least 2023 until early 2025, without having been withdrawn for rest or reconstitution at any point.

== Structure ==
=== 1997 ===
- Headquarters (Novy)
- 100th Tank Częstochowa Regiment (Dzerzhinsk)
- 237th Tank Regiment (Dzerzhinsk)
- 245th Guards Motor Rifle Gniezno Regiment (Mulino)
- 752nd Guards Motor Rifle Regiment (Novy settlement, Nizhny Novgorod)
- 99th Guards Self-Propelled Artillery Pomeranian Regiment (Mulino)
- 1143rd Anti-Aircraft Oder Regiment (Novy)
- 159th Separate Anti-Tank Battalion (Mulino)
- 84th Separate Reconnaissance Battalion (Nizhny Novgorod)
- 145th Separate Engineer Sapper Battalion (Seyma)
- 692nd Separate Signal Battalion (Novy)
- 9th Separate Electronic Warfare Battalion (Bor)
- 625th Separate NBC protection Battalion
- 152nd Separate Maintenance Battalion
- 911th Separate Supply Battalion
- 231st Separate Medical Battalion

=== 2017 ===
- Headquarters (Valuyki)
- 237th Guards Tank Regiment (Soloti)
- 252nd Guards Motor Rifle Stalingrad-Korsun Regiment (Boguchar)
- 752nd Guards Motor Rifle Regiment (Valuyki, Soloti)
- 99th Guards Self-Propelled Pomeranian Regiment (Boguchar)
- 1143rd Anti-Aircraft Oder Regiment
- 84th Separate Reconnaissance Battalion (Valuyki)
- 159th Separate Anti-Tank Artillery Battalion
- 692nd Separate Signal Battalion (Valuyki)
- 337th Separate Engineer-Sapper Battalion (Boguchar)
- 911th Separate Supply Battalion (Boguchar)
- 231st Separate Medical Battalion (Boguchar)
- Separate UAV Company
- Separate EW Company
- Separate NBC protection company

=== 2021 ===
- 237th Tank Regiment (Valuyki and Soloti, Belgorod Oblast, Military Unit Number 91726)
- 245th Motorised Rifle Regiment (Soloti, established in December 2021)
- 252nd Motor Rifle Regiment (Boguchar, Voronezh Oblast, MUN 91711)
- 752nd Guards Motor Rifle Regiment (Valuyki and Soloti, Belgorod Oblast, MUN 34670)
- 84th Reconnaissance Battalion (Valuyki and Soloti, Belgorod Oblast, MUN 22263)
- 1143rd Anti-Aircraft Missile Regiment (Belgorod Oblast)
- 99th Self-propelled Artillery Regiment (Boguchar, Voronezh Oblast, MUN 91727)
- 159th Anti-Tank Battalion (Boguchar, Voronezh Oblast, MUN 81989)

== Commanders ==
- 2008-2010? Major General Konstantin Georgyevich Kastornov
- 25.10.2011–after June 2014 Colonel Sergei Semyonovich Nyrkov
- ...
- 2016–2019 Major General Andrei Yuryevich Ruzinskiy
- 12.01.2019–present Colonel/Major General Aleksei Vyacheslavovich Avdeyev

== Sources ==
- June 1998 report by Andrew Duncan in Jane's Intelligence Review
- Feskov, V.I.; Kalashnikov, K.A.; Golikov, V.I. (2004). The Soviet Army in the Years of the 'Cold War' (1945–1991). Tomsk: Tomsk University Press. ISBN 5-7511-1819-7.

== Gallery ==
3rd Motor Rifle Division exercise 2017 in Voronezh Oblast.

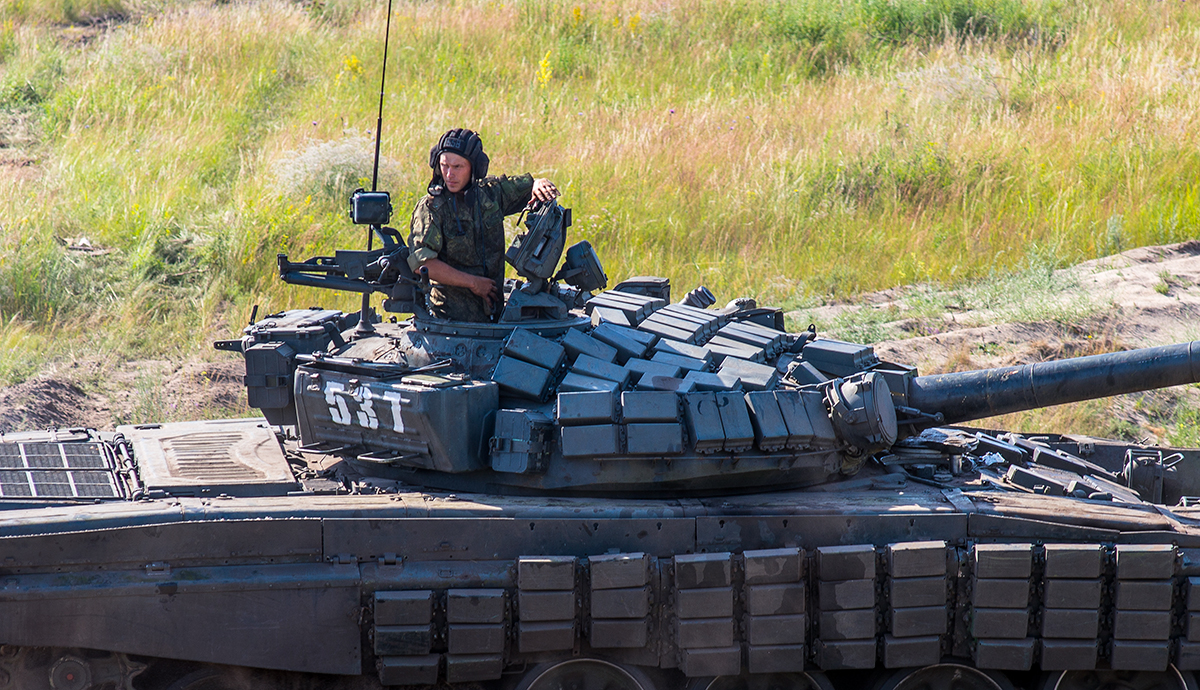

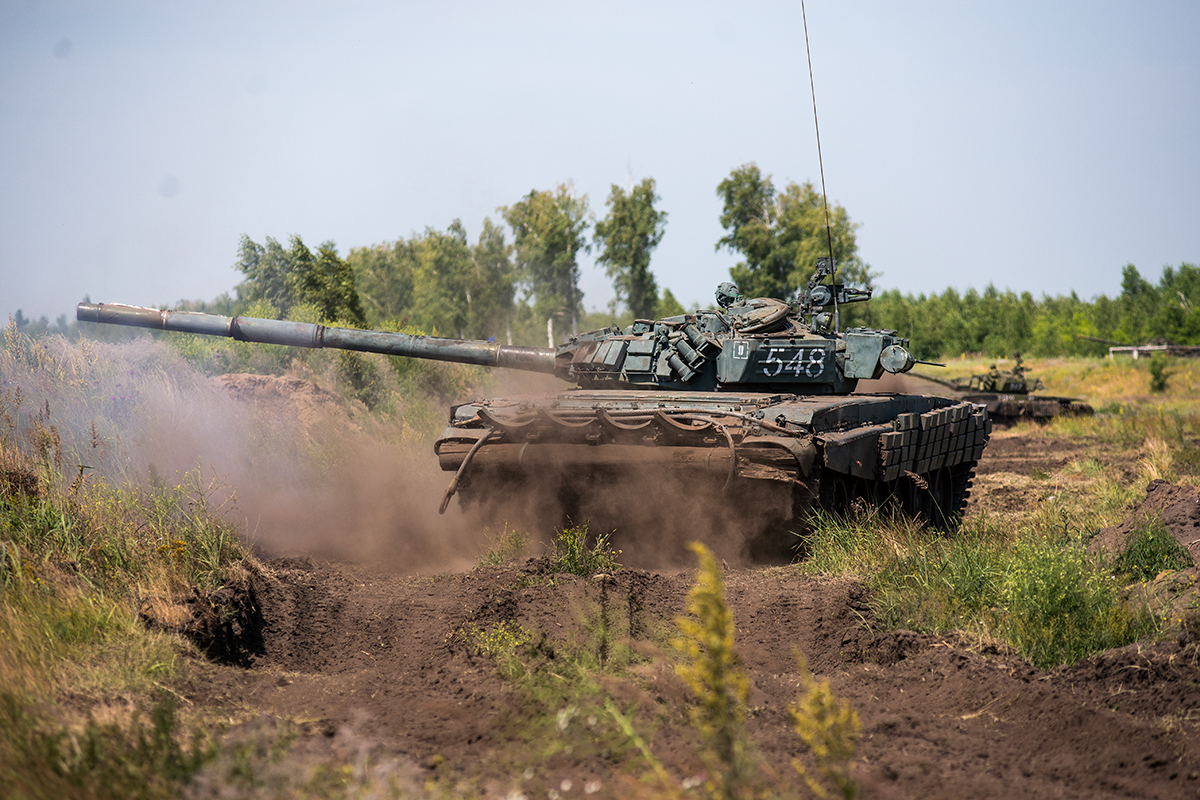

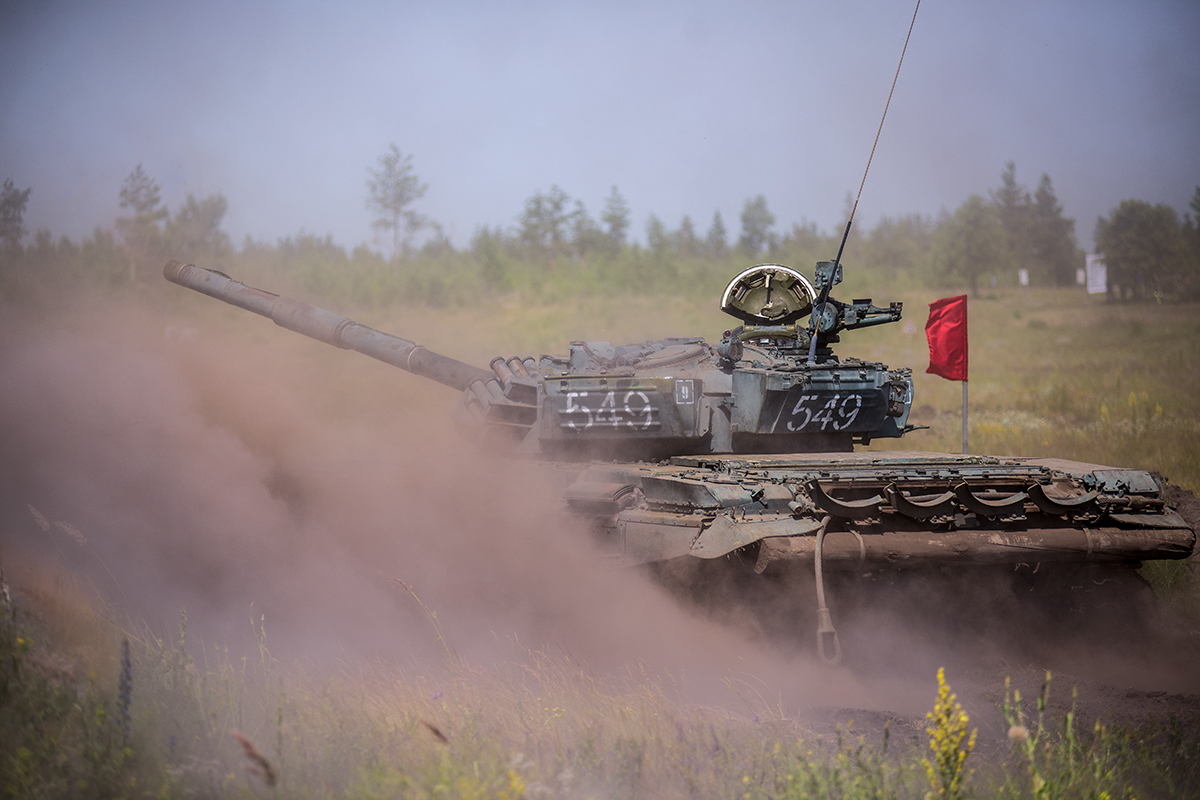

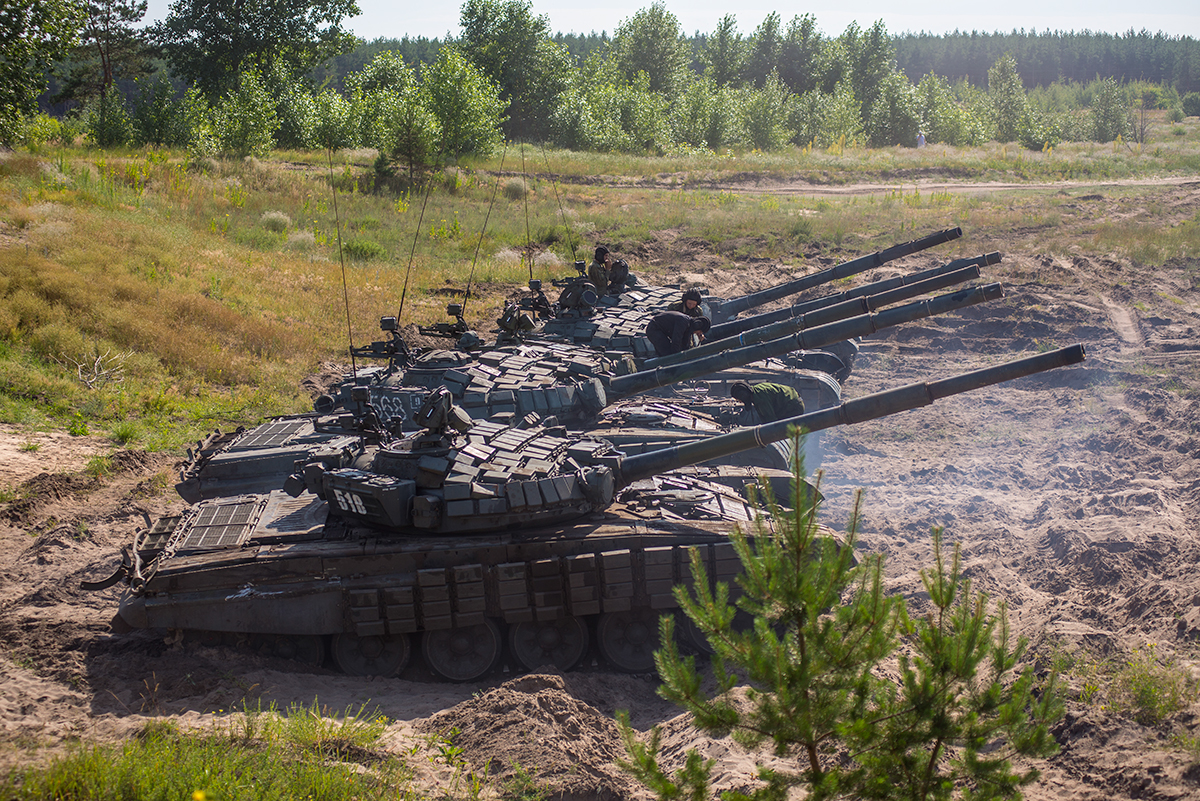

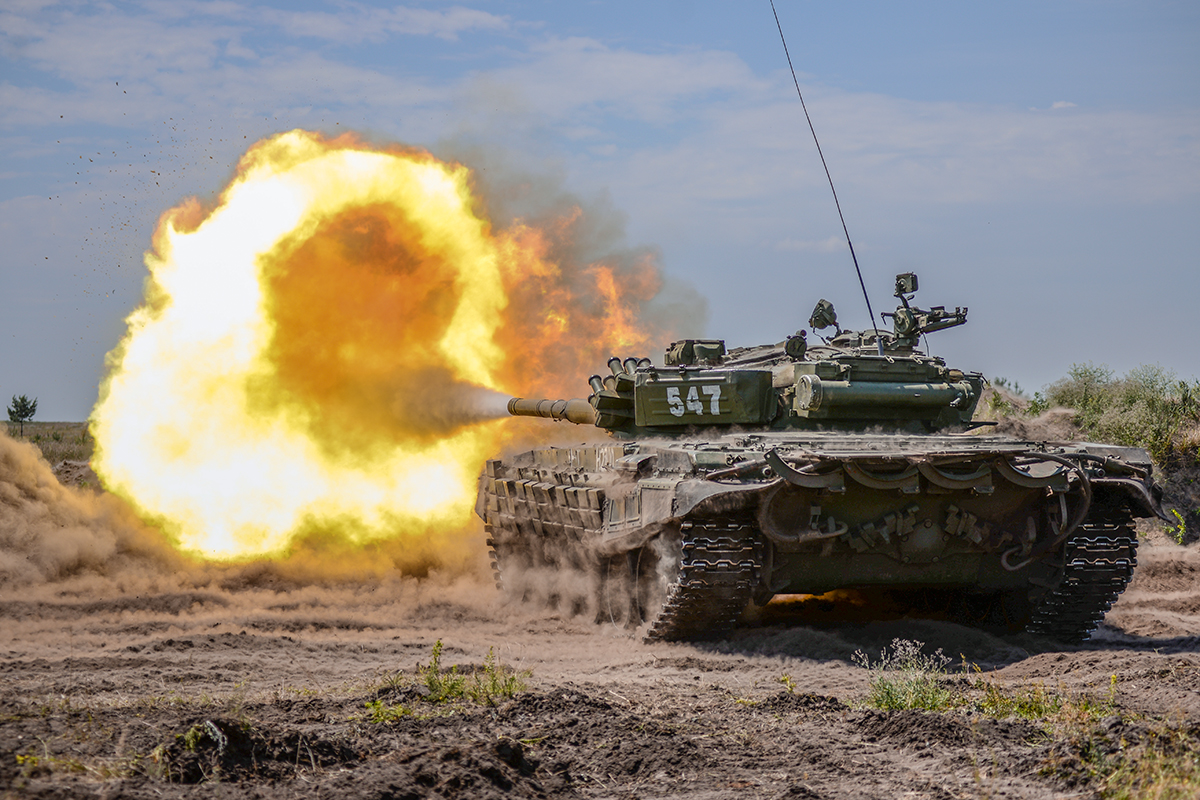

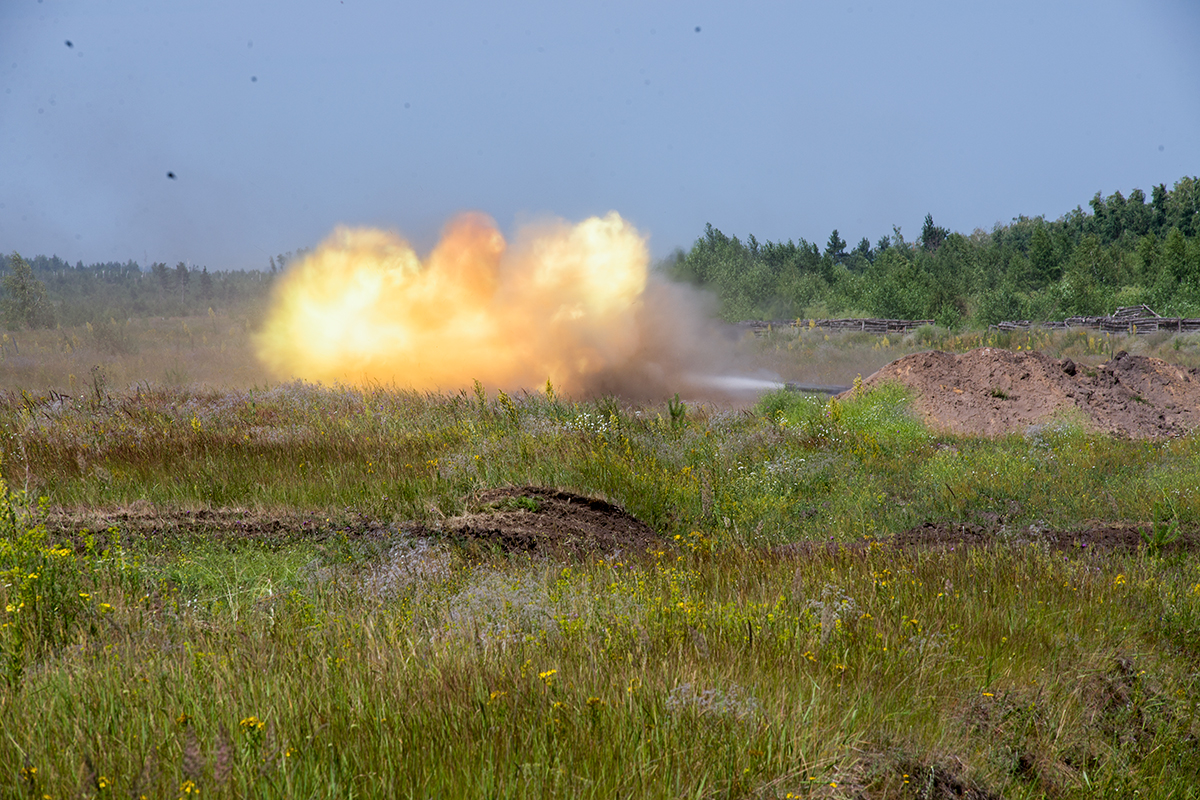

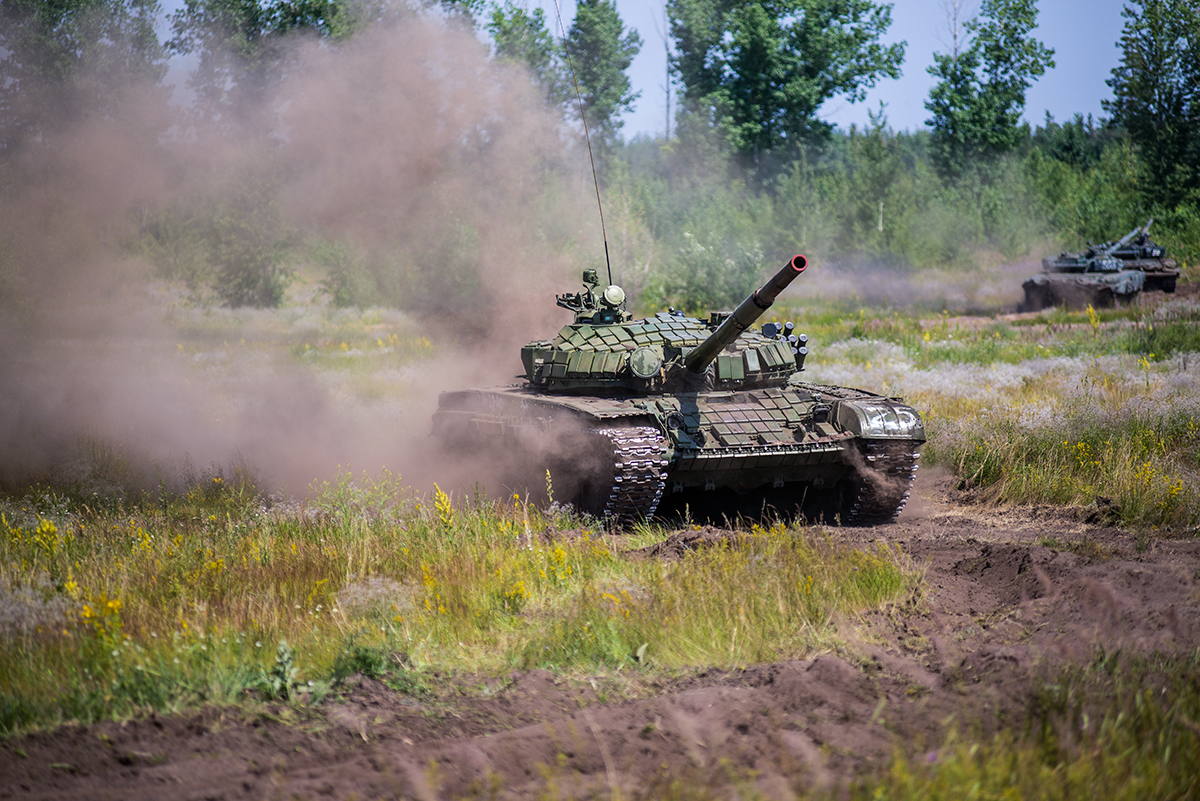

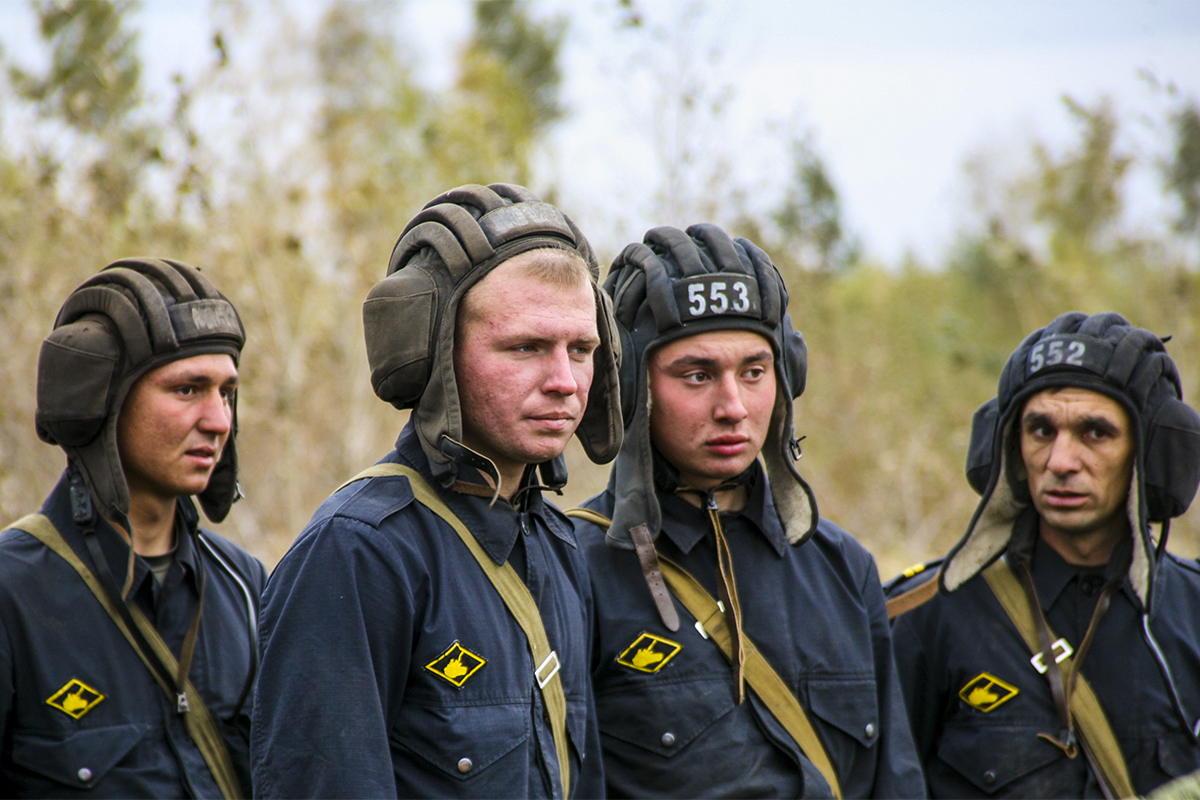

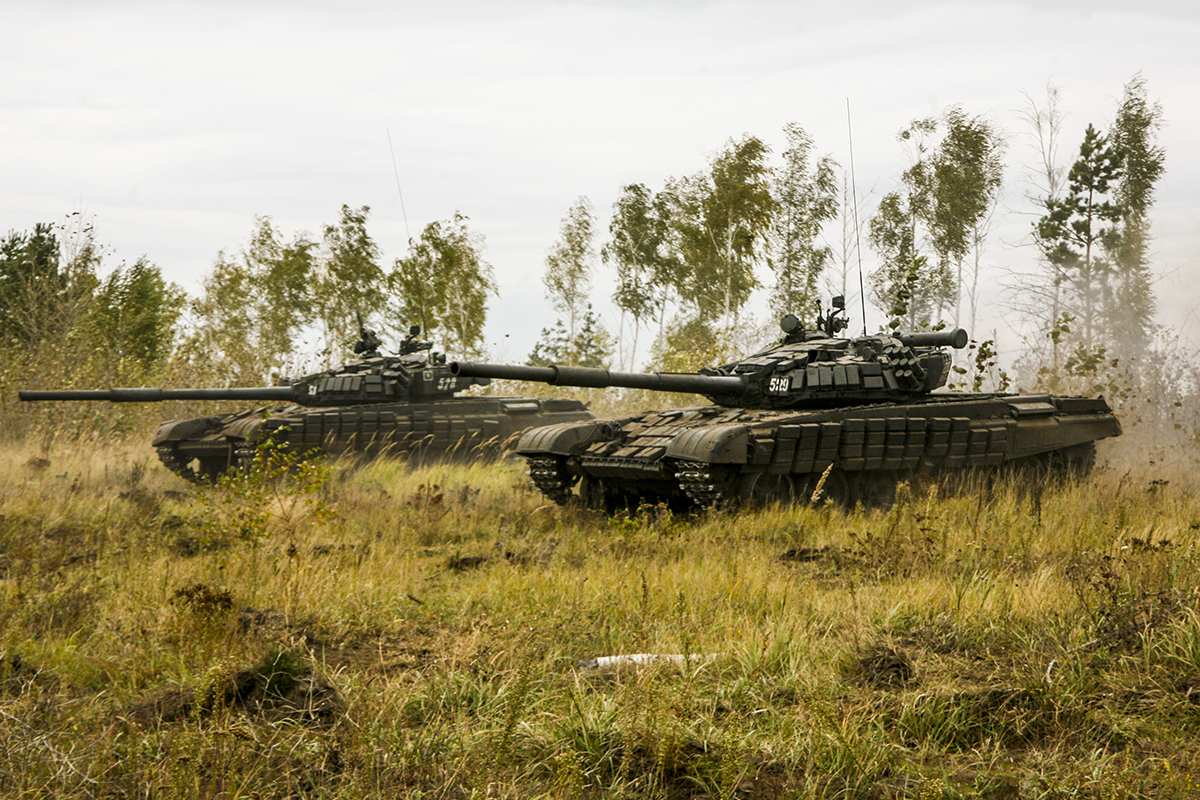

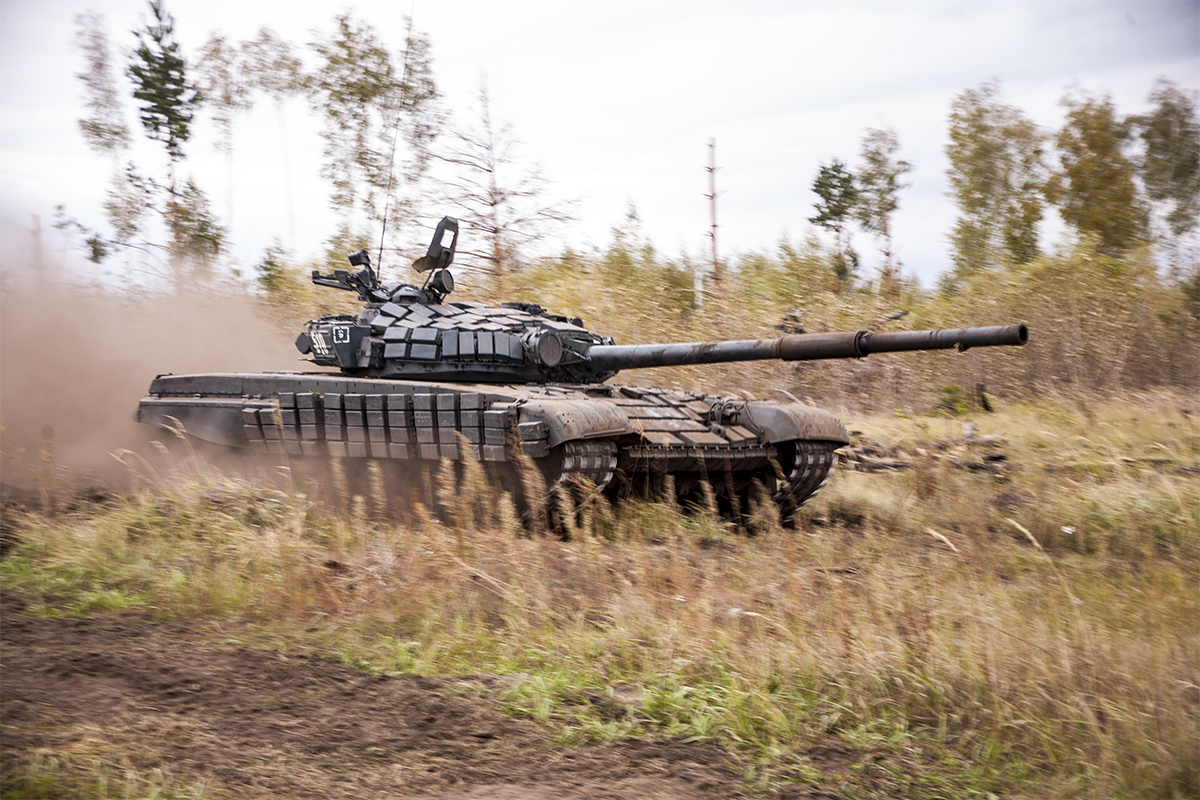

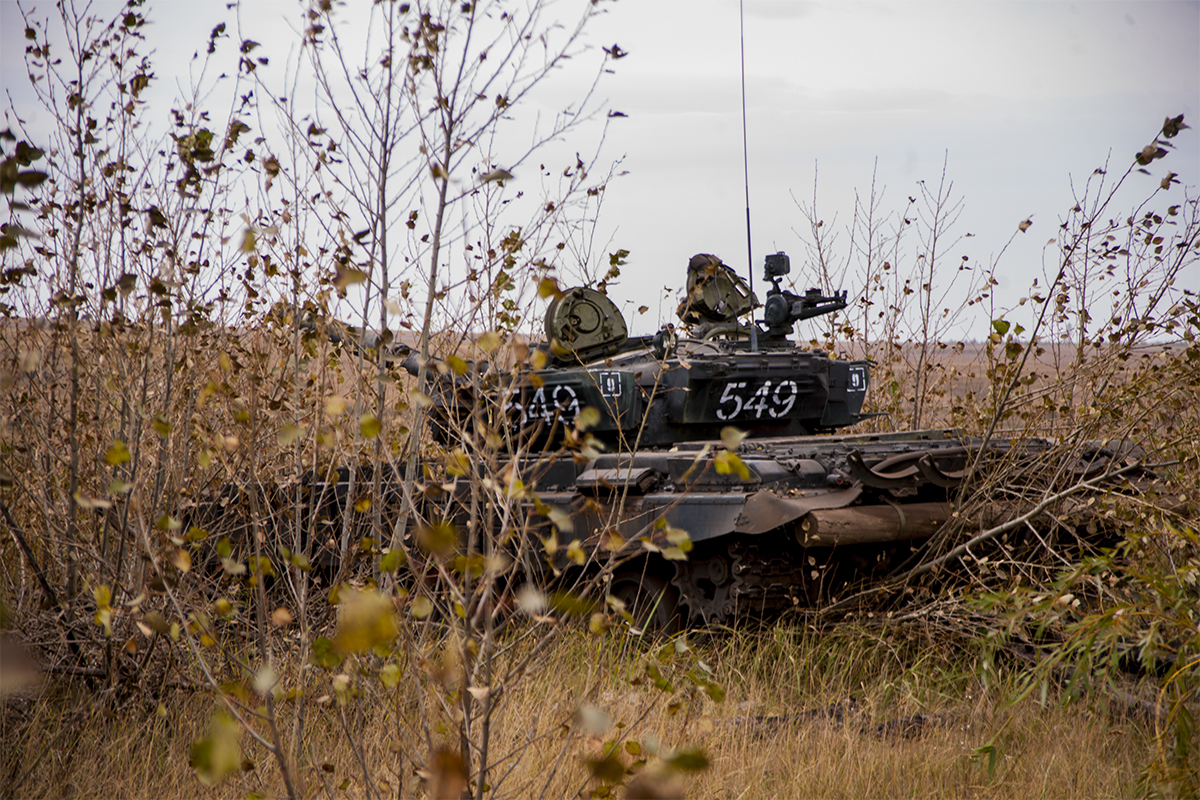

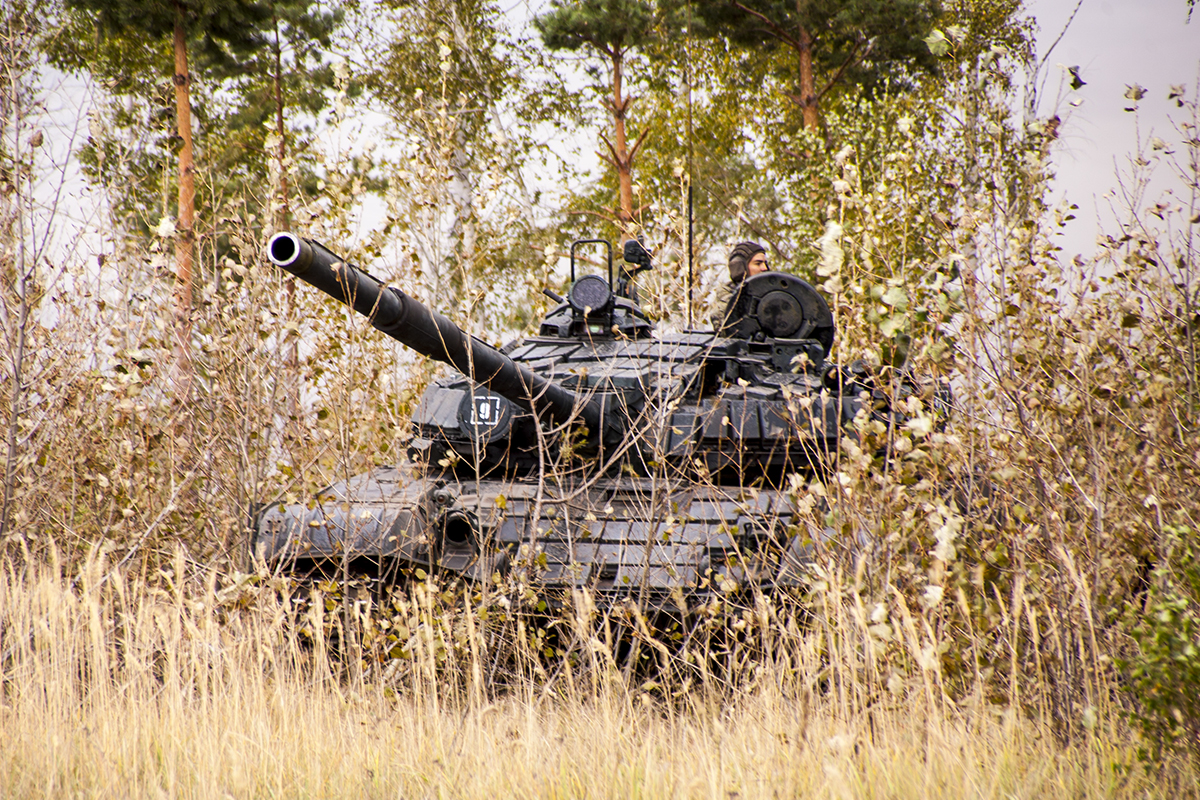

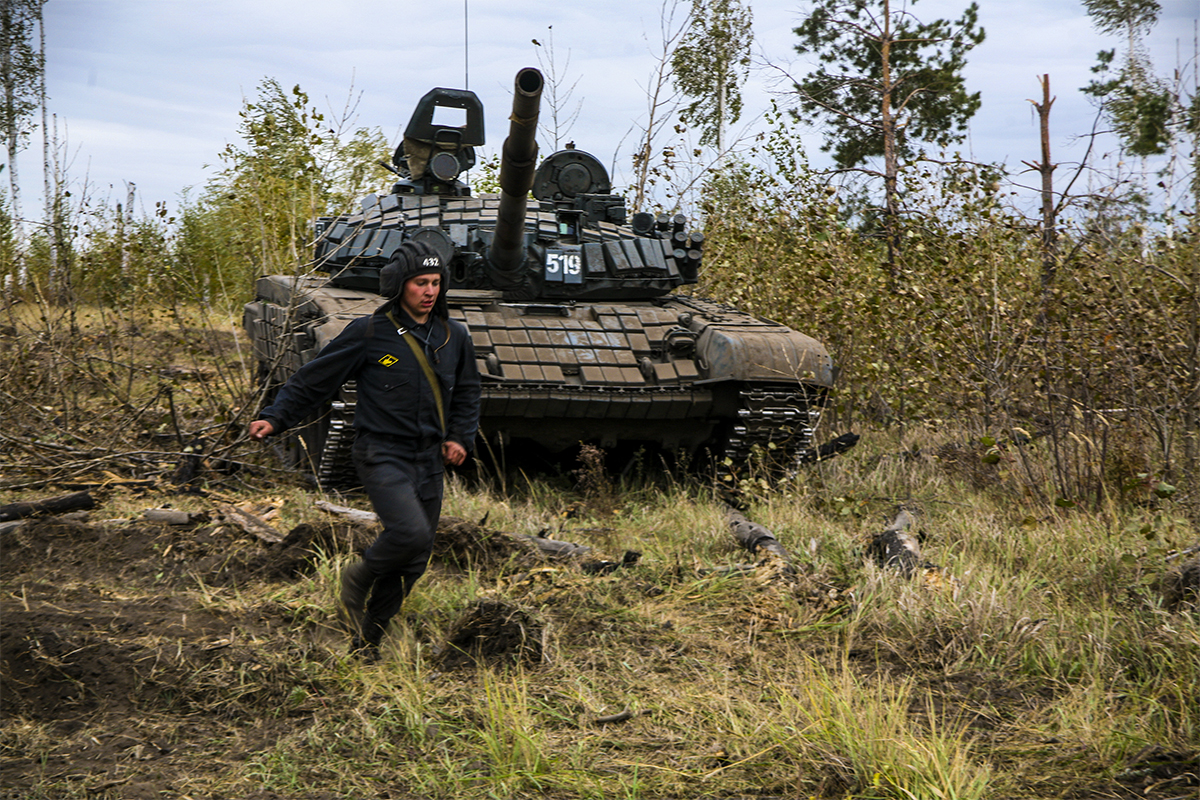

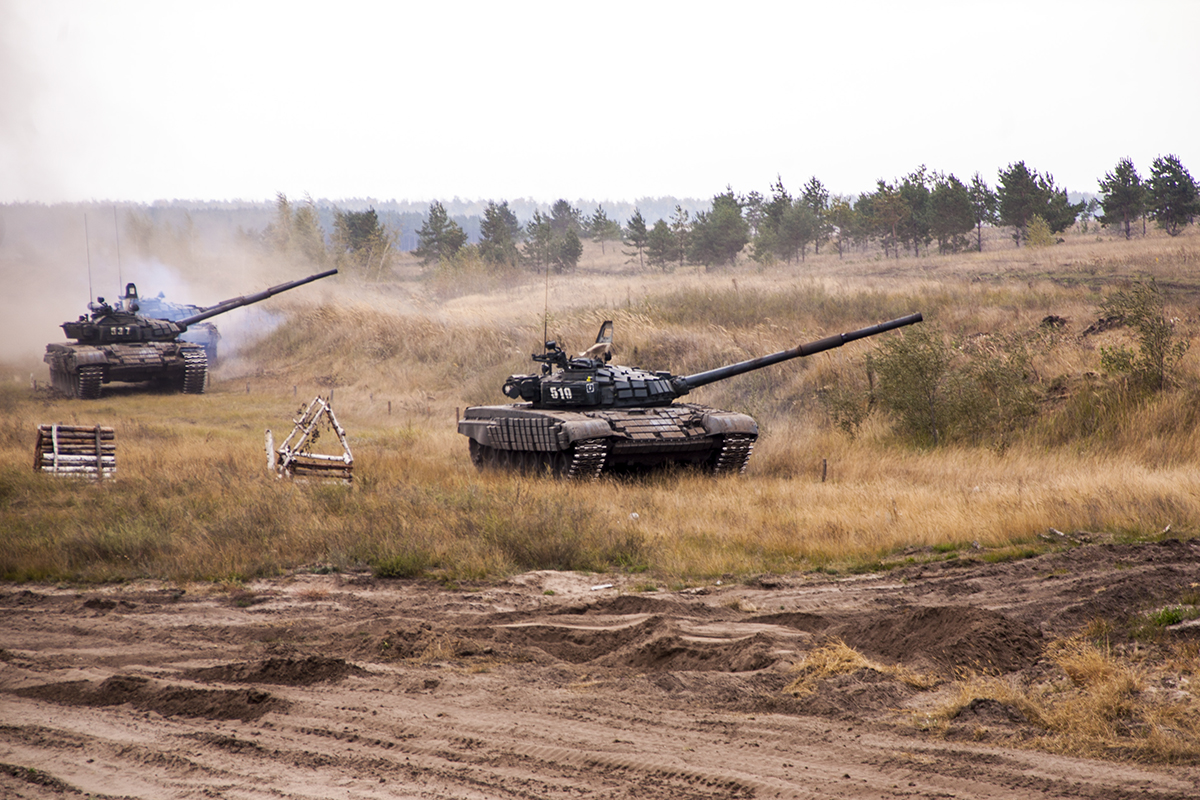

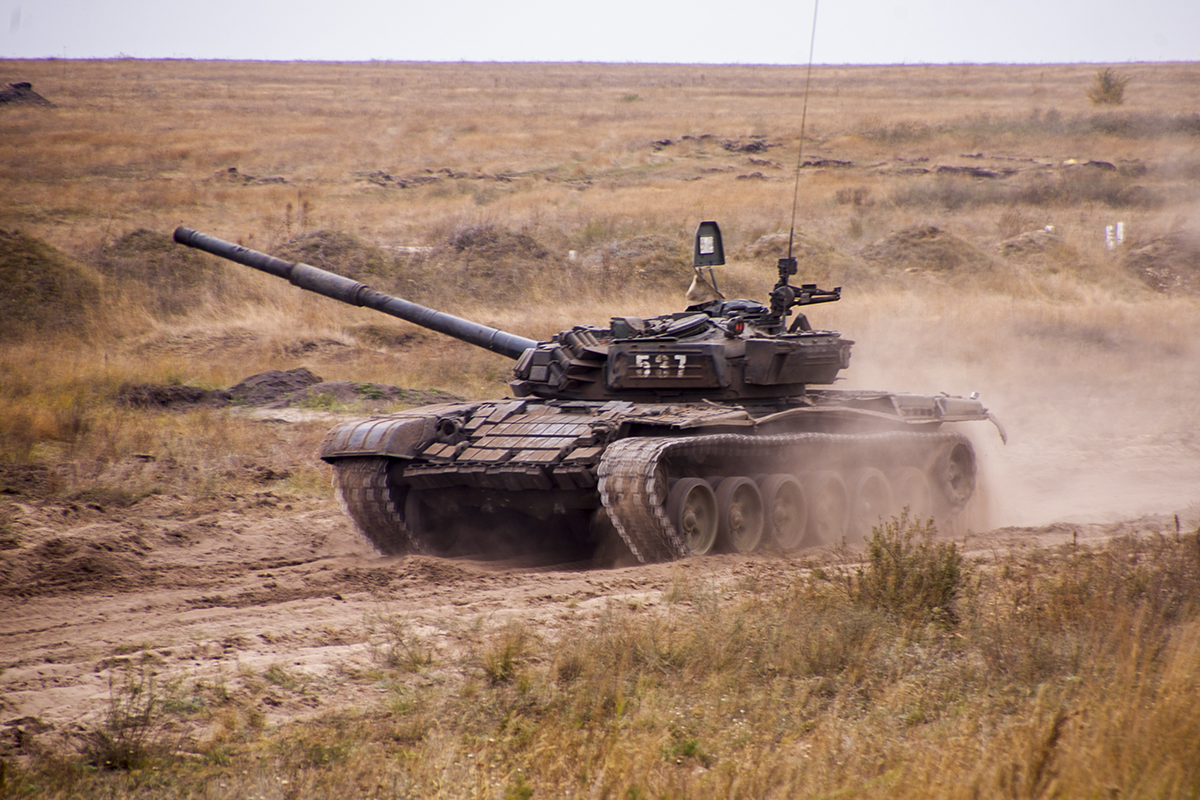

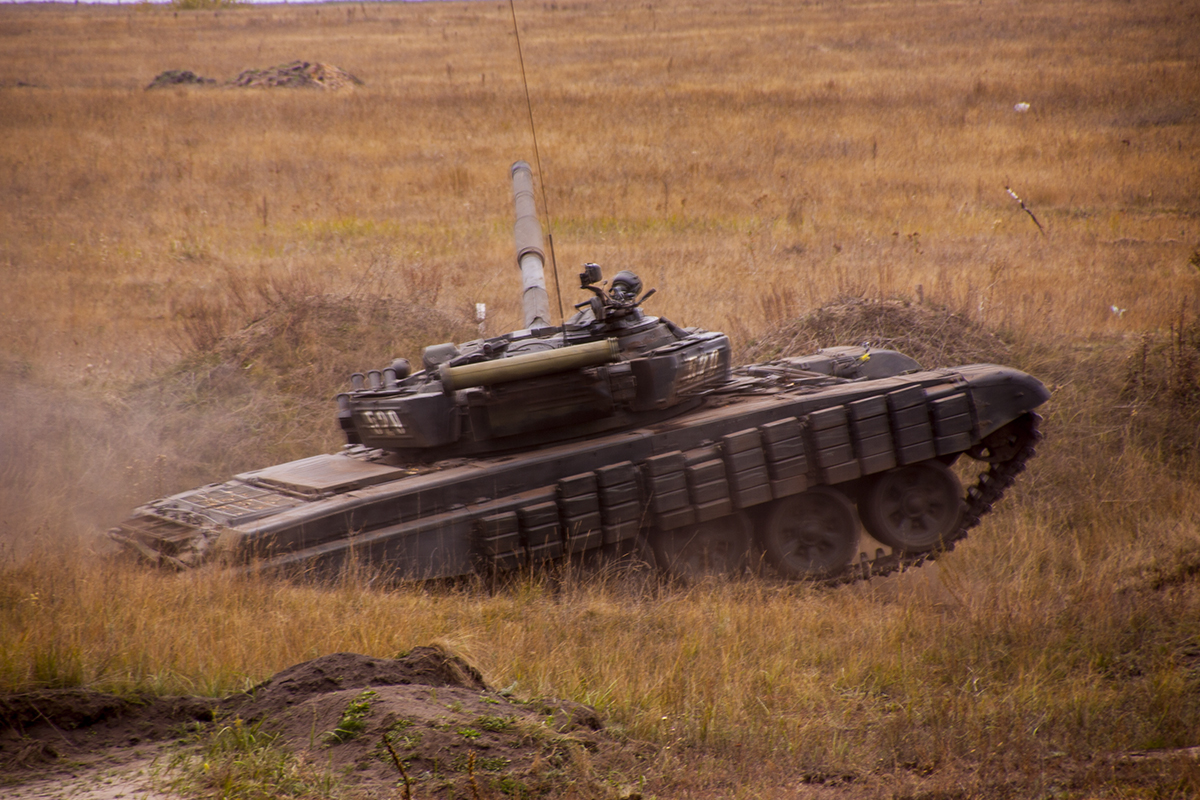

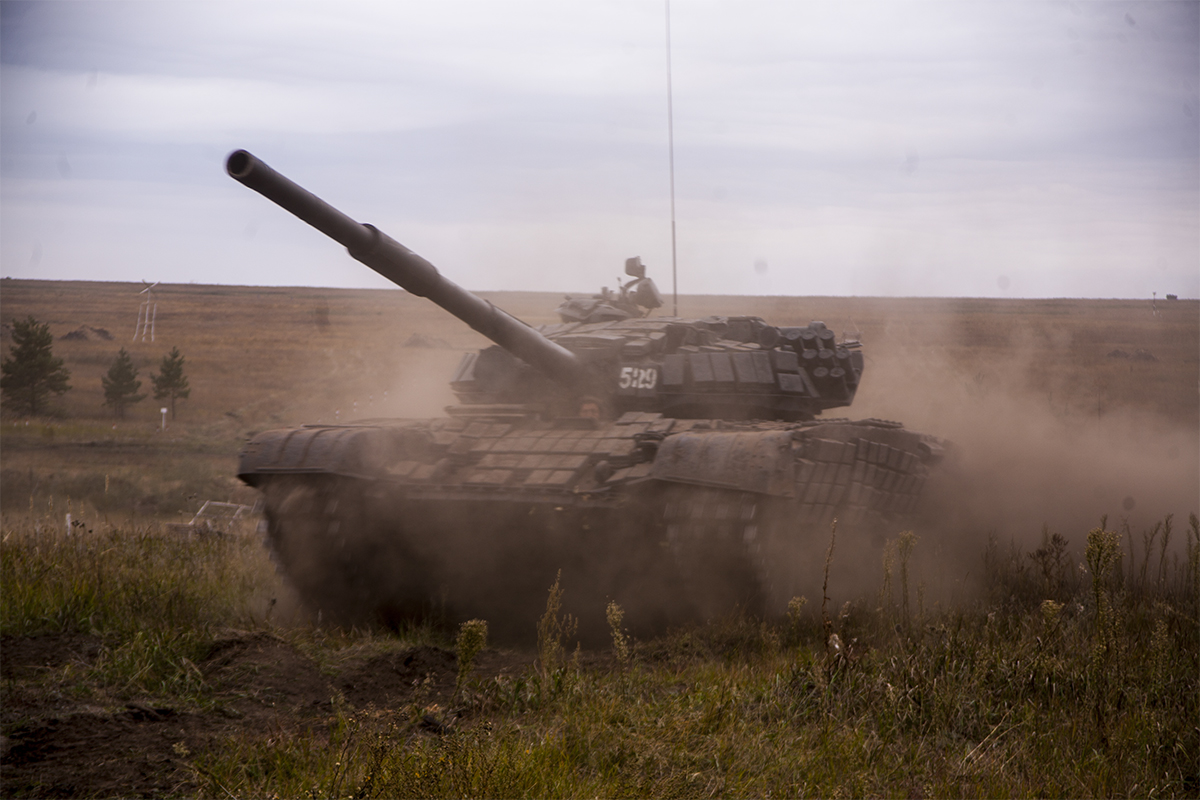

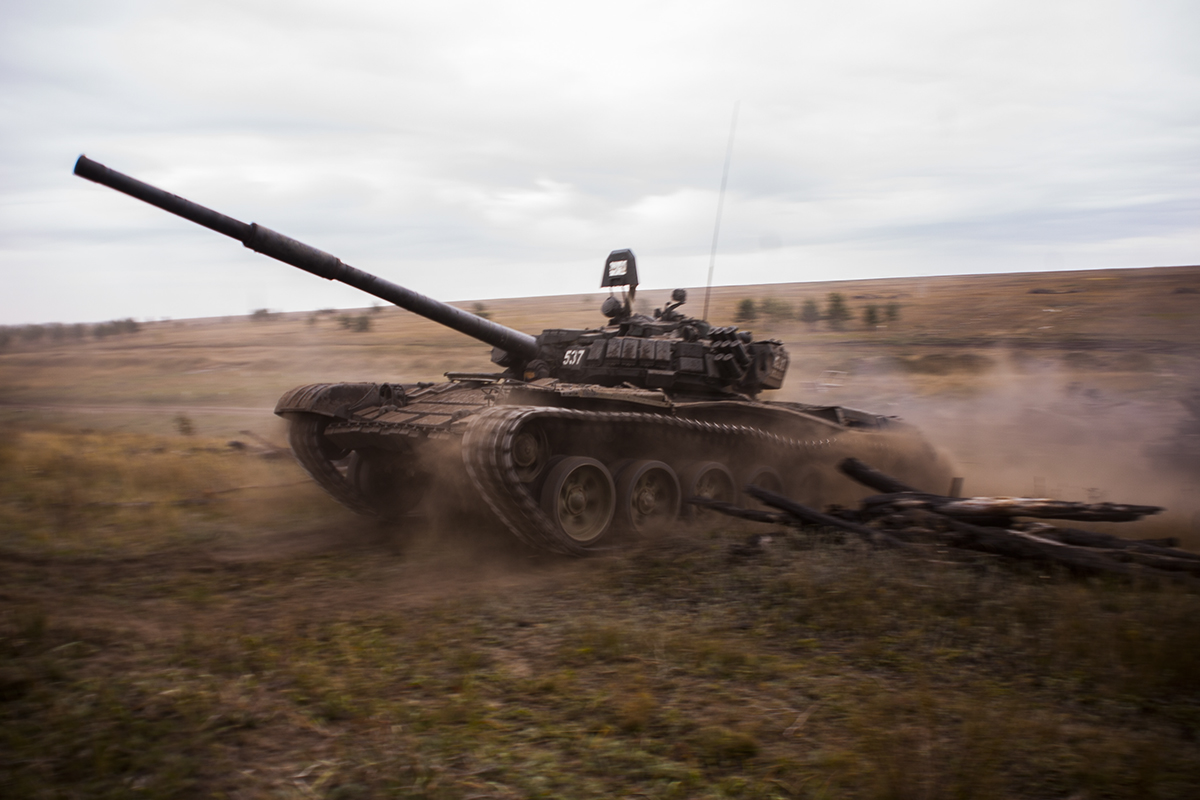
