= 34th Guards Artillery Division =

34th Guards Artillery Division (1993–2009) 34th Artillery Division (1945–1993)
- Active: 1945–2009
- Country: Soviet Union; Russian Federation
- Branch: Soviet Army; Russian Ground Forces
- Type: Artillery
- Garrison/HQ: Potsdam; Mulino
- Anniversaries: 9 July (formation)
- Decorations: Guards; Order of the Red Banner; Order of Suvorov
- Battle honours: Perekop

The 34th Guards Artillery Perekop Red Banner Order of Suvorov Division (Russian: 34-я гвардейская артиллерийская Перекопская Краснознамённая, ордена Суворова дивизия) was an artillery division of the Soviet Ground Forces and the Russian Ground Forces. It was formed after the Second World War in Potsdam as the 34th Artillery Division and served there with the Group of Soviet Forces in Germany. In 1993 it inherited the honors of the disbanded 2nd Guards Artillery Division. The division withdrew to Mulino, Nizhny Novgorod Oblast, in 1994 and was disbanded in 2009.

== History ==
The division was formed as the 34th Artillery Division as part of the Group of Soviet Occupation Forces in Germany's 4th Artillery Corps at Potsdam from 25 June to 9 July 1945. It included the 30th and 38th Guards and the 148th Cannon Artillery Brigades. In 1953, the 4th Artillery Corps was disbanded and the division was directly subordinated to the GSFG Staff.

In 1958, the 38th Guards Cannon Artillery Brigade was renamed the 243rd Guards Cannon Artillery Regiment. In 1960, the 30th Guards Cannon Artillery Brigade became the 248th Guards Cannon Artillery Regiment. The 148th Cannon Artillery Brigade returned to the Soviet Union in 1960 with the 6th Artillery Division. The 17th Cannon Artillery Regiment and 245th Heavy Howitzer Regiment were transferred to the 34th from the 6th Division. In 1961 the division became part of the Rocket Forces and Artillery - renamed that year.

In 1970, the 245th Regiment became the 288th Heavy Howitzer Artillery Brigade, and the 258th Guards Regiment became the 286th Guards Cannon Artillery Brigade. In 1974, the 243rd became the 303rd Guards Cannon Artillery Brigade, and the 17th Regiment became the 307th Reactive Artillery Brigade. In 1982, the 303rd was rearmed with 48 2S7 Pion. In 1989, the 303rd was rearmed with the 2S5 Giatsint-S. The 122nd Anti-Tank Artillery Brigade joined the brigade in January 1989.

- Drummed the last march
- https://www.alamy.com/stock-photo-a-red-army-soldier-has-drummed-the-last-march-before-his-unit-is-withdrawn-59948707.html

In 1993, the division inherited the honors of the disbanded 2nd Guards Artillery Division and became the 34th Guards Perekop Red Banner Order of Suvorov Artillery Division. From 10 April to 1 September 1994 it was withdrawn to Mulino, where it replaced the 20th Artillery Training Division. The division was disbanded in 2009.
