= 4th Artillery Corps =

Military unit

The 4th Artillery Berlin Red Banner Breakthrough Corps of the RGK — (4 акп РГК) was a military formation, artillery breakthrough corps Reserve of the Supreme High Command of the Red Army during the Second World War.

== History ==
The 4th Artillery Corps of the Reserve of the Supreme High Command (RVGK) was formed on April 24, 1943, and on the basis of the resolution of the State Defence Committee (GKO) of April 12 1943.

During the war it fought as part of the Central Front; 1st Belorussian Front; and 2nd Belorussian Front.

The corps' formations, units, and awards included:

- 5th Artillery Kalinkovichi Red Banner Breakthrough Division
- 6th Artillery Mozyr Order of Lenin Red Banner Breakthrough Division
- 12th Artillery Red Banner Orders of Kutuzov and Bogdan Khmelnitsky Breakthrough Division
- 5th Guards Mortar Kalinkovichskaya Red Banner, Order of the Suvorov Division
- 34th Guards Artillery Perekop Red Banner, Order of the Suvorov Division (after its formation in June-July 1945)
- 3rd Guards Anti-tank Artillery Brest-Warsaw, Order of Lenin, Red Banner, Order of Kutuzov Brigade
- 4th Guards Anti-Tank Artillery Rechitsko-Radom twice Red Banner Orders of Suvorov, Kutuzov and Bogdan Khmelnitsky Brigade
- 20th separate anti-tank artillery Stalingrad-Rechitsa Red Banner Orders of Suvorov and Kutuzov Brigade
- 1002nd Separate Order of the Red Star Signals Battalion
- 821st Separate Reconnaissance Artillery Kalinkovichsky Red Banner Orders of Bohdan Khmelnitsky and Alexander Nevsky Division.

On 9 May 1945, at the end of the war in Europe, the corps was made up of the 5th Breakthrough Artillery Division; the 12th Breakthrough Artillery Division; the 5th Guards Mortar Division (multiple rocket launchers); the 1002nd Communications Battalion; the 821st Separate Reconnaissance Artillery Battalion; and the 2355th military postal station.

The 34th Artillery Division was formed within the corps in 1945. By that time the corps was part of the Group of Soviet Forces in Germany. In 1953, the 4th Artillery Corps was disbanded.
