= 47th Tank Division (Russia) =

Russian Ground Forces formation

47th Tank Division (2022–present) 6th Separate Tank Brigade (2009–2022) 100th Tank Regiment (1945–2009) 100th Tank Brigade (1942–1945)
- Russian: 47-я танковая Ченстоховская Краснознамённая, ордена Кутузова дивизия
- Great emblem of the 47th Tank Division
- Active: 1942–2009; 2022–present
- Country: Soviet Union (1942–1991); Russia (1991–2009, 2022–present)
- Branch: Russian Ground Forces
- Type: Armoured Forces
- Size: Division
- Part of: Moscow Military District; 1st Guards Tank Army
- Garrison/HQ: Mulino; MUN 54096
- Engagements: World War II; Operation Danube; Russo-Ukrainian War; War in Donbas; Battle of Ilovaisk; Battle of Debaltseve; Russian invasion of Ukraine; Battle of Sumy; Battle of Kharkiv (2022); Battle of Izium; 2024 Kharkiv offensive; 2024 Kursk offensive; Kupiansk offensive
- Decorations: Order of the Red Banner; Order of Kutuzov
- Battle honours: Czestochowa

Commanders
- Current commander: Major General Azer Nuralievich Ramazanov

Insignia
- Shoulder Patch

The 47th Czestochowa Red Banner Order of Kutuzov Tank Division (Russian: 47-я танковая Ченстоховская Краснознамённая, ордена Кутузова дивизия; Military Unit Number 54096) is a formation of the Russian Ground Forces. The late 6th Tank Brigade fought in the war in Donbas of 2014–2015. In 2022, the brigade was reorganized into the 47th Tank Division, retaining its historical form, awards, and combat glory.

== History ==
The historical predecessor of the 47th Tank Division is the 100th Tank Brigade of the 31st Tank Corps, which was formed on March 3, 1942 in the city of Noginske, Moscow region and began its combat journey near Rzhev, participating in the defeat of the tank divisions of Waffen-SS: “Totenkopf” and “Leibstandarte SS Adolf Hitler". Then the unit took part in battles on the North-Western and Voronezh Fronts. For its actions during World War II, the brigade was awarded the Order of the Red Banner, the Order of Kutuzov 2nd class, and the honorific "Czestochowa".

In 1945 the brigade, part of the 31st Tank Corps, became the 100th Tank Regiment as part of a reorganization of the Soviet Tank Troops. At the same time the corps became the 31st Tank Division. The regiment was based in Khmelnitsky. The regiment fought in Operation Danube, the suppression of the Prague Spring. After the end of the operation the regiment stayed in Czechoslovakia with the division and was based at Frenštát pod Radhoštěm. In early 1990 the regiment withdrew to Dzerzhinsk.

The 6th Separate Tank Brigade was formed in June 2009 as part of the 20th Guards Army in Mulino from the 100th Tank Regiment. In August 2014 the brigade's units fought in the Battle of Ilovaisk. On 26 August, during a fight near Ahronomichne village, a T-72B3 tank of the 1st Company of the brigade's 3rd Battalion was captured by troops of the Ukrainian 51st Mechanized Brigade. During the Ukrainian forces' withdrawal from Ilovaisk on 29 August, Donbas Battalion fighters were able to seize and destroy another two brigade T-72B3 tanks near Chervonosilske village, capturing two prisoners: Ivan Badanin and Eugen Chernov, as well as some paratroopers of the 31st Air Assault Brigade.

In November 2014 the brigade became part of the 1st Guards Tank Army. In February 2015 the brigade's units fought in Battle of Debaltseve.

According to Telegram users, "unofficial sources" claimed that the 6th Tank Brigade was reformed into the 47th Guards Tank Division on 1 December 2021, and that the 26th Tank Regiment had been formed out of the main units of the former brigade.

In early December 2021, a local newspaper reported that the 6th Tank Brigade was no longer in existence and that the 26th Tank Regiment of the 47th Guards Tank Division had been newly deployed to the brigade's base in Mulino. It was reported that Colonel E. V. Doroshenko was the commander of the 47th Division.

Citing "Western sources", Telegram users claimed that trains with the 26th Tank Regiment's military vehicles arrived in Kursk in early February 2022.

=== Russo-Ukrainian war (2022–present) ===
A 1st Guards Tank Army document covering losses until 15 March, published by Ukrainian intelligence, revealed that the 26th Tank Regiment had lost four killed, 13 wounded and sixteen vehicles, and the 7th Separate Reconnaissance Battalion had lost five killed and 13 wounded.

On 17 March 2022, the Ukrainian military claimed to have stopped a Russian column as it was moving in the direction of Kamyanka, Kharkiv Oblast. It was said that the column consisted of military vehicles belonging to the 26th Tank Regiment's battalion tactical group, as well as the 437th Training Regiment.

On 27 March 2022, the Ukrainian general staff claimed that 600 bodies of servicemen of the 47th Tank Division had been sent to Nizhny Novgorod region. Three days later, the Ukrainian military claimed that after their experience fighting in Ukraine, conscripts from the 26th Tank Regiment had requested to terminate their contracts.

On 12 April 2022, Ukrainian Defence Intelligence wrote that soldiers of the 47th Division had failed to receive promised additional payments for fighting in Ukraine and that the military leadership had ignored appeals for the money.

On 15 January 2023, the Ukrainian military claimed that a battalion of the division's 26th Tank Regiment had reportedly been reduced to just 30 men and 10 T-80 tanks.

According to Ukrainian military observer Kostiantyn Mashovets, elements of up to three battalions from the 47th Division were operating near Vovchansk in July 2024, after Russian forces had opened a new front in the area the previous May.

== Commanders ==
=== Commanders of the 100th Tank Brigade ===
- Colonel Ivanov Nikolay Mikhailovich (01.04.1942 — 21.07.1943)
- Major Potapov Vasily Mikhailovich (22.07.1943 — 27.09.1943)
- Lieutenant Colonel Verevchenko Pyotr Danilovich (28.09.1943 — 06.02.1944)
- Colonel Mikhailov Isai Petrovich, (07.02.1944 — 25.11.1944)
- Colonel Zlenko Mikhail Kuzmich, (26.11.1944 — 15.12.1944)
- Colonel Gladnev Dmitry Fyodorovich, (16.12.1945 — 24.05.1945)
- Lieutenant Colonel Cheshuk Nikolay Vasilievich, (25.05.1945 — 11.06.1945)

=== Commanders of the 6th Tank Brigade ===
- Colonel Vyacheslav Nikolaevich Gurov (30 March 2011 — 20 January 2012)
- ...
- Dmitri Nikolaevich Baklushin (???? — 2022)

=== Commanders of the 47th Tank Division ===
- Major General Azer Nuralievich Ramazanov (2024 – present)

== Composition ==
47th Tank Division at the training ground Mulino conducts bilateral company exercises with military personnel of Belarus; 19 March 2021.

- 26th Tank Regiment
- 153rd Tank Regiment
- 245th Guards Motor Rifle Regiment
- 272nd Motor Rifle Regiment
- 380th Motorized Rifle Regiment
- 4th Volunteer Assault Brigade (Egyptian volunteers)
- 7th Separate Reconnaissance Battalion
- 1077th Separate Material Supply Battalion
- 63rd Separate Anti-Aircraft Missile Battalion.
