= Vasily Shugayev =

Soviet Army major general

Vasily Minayevich Shugayev
- Born: 9 April 1905; Ptichye, Stavropolsky Uyezd, Stavropol Governorate, Russian Empire
- Died: 21 November 1976 (aged 71) Kishinev, Soviet Union
- Allegiance: Soviet Union
- Branch: Red Army (later Soviet Army)
- Service years: 1927–1954
- Rank: Major general
- Commands: 47th Guards Rifle Division; 180th Rifle Division; 36th Rifle Division
- Conflicts: World War II
- Awards: Hero of the Soviet Union

Vasily Minayevich Shugayev (Russian: Василий Минаевич Шугаев; 9 April 1905 – 21 November 1976) was a Soviet Army major general and a Hero of the Soviet Union.

Drafted into the Red Army in the late 1920s, Shugayev became a junior officer in cavalry units after enlisted service. After graduating from the Frunze Military Academy's staff department in the late 1930s, he served in staff positions, which he held by the beginning of Operation Barbarossa. After fighting in the Battle of Smolensk and the Battle of Moscow, Shugayev became a regimental commander in the 154th Rifle Division in early 1942. He continued in command of the same regiment when the division was converted into the 47th Guards Rifle Division, leading it during the division's advance into Ukraine from mid-1943. Given command of the division in March 1944, Shugayev was made a Hero of the Soviet Union for his leadership in the Lublin–Brest Offensive in August, but was severely wounded in late August and evacuated. Returning to command of the 47th Guards after nearly two months, he led it for the rest of the war, which it ended in the Battle of Berlin. After graduating from a course at the Voroshilov Higher Military Academy in the late 1940s, he commanded the 180th and 36th Rifle Divisions before his 1954 retirement for health reasons.

== Early life and interwar period ==
Shugayev was born on 9 April 1905 in the stanitsa of Ptichye, Stavropolsky Uyezd, Stavropol Governorate to a peasant family. He was drafted into the Red Army in November 1927 and became a Red Army man in the 28th Cavalry Regiment of the North Caucasus Military District, stationed in Novocherkassk. From November 1928, after graduating from the regimental school, he served in the regiment as an assistant platoon commander and starshina in the regimental school. Having become a Communist Party of the Soviet Union member in 1929, Shugayev decided to continue his service as an officer and entered the North Caucasus Mountain Peoples Cavalry School in Krasnodar in 1930. Upon graduation in 1932, he was assigned to the 76th S.M. Budyonny Red Banner Cavalry Regiment of the 12th Cavalry Division, serving as a commander of cavalry and regimental school platoons before becoming a machine gun squadron commander.

From September 1935, he commanded a platoon of the 1st Cavalry Army Red Banner Combined Cavalry School in Tambov, and a year later transferred to the 5th M.F. Blinov Stavropol Cavalry Division, based at Slavuta in the Kiev Military District. There, Shugayev served as a squadron commander in the 29th Cavalry Regiment, and from December 1937 as assistant chief of staff of the 26th Cavalry Regiment. Between November 1938 and May 1939 he studied at the 5th faculty (staff work) of the Frunze Military Academy after passing examinations for seven years of schooling, then returned to his previous position. In September 1939 he was transferred to become temporary assistant head of the 1st staff department of the 2nd Cavalry Corps in the Odessa Military District. From December 1939, Shugayev served as chief of staff of the 101st Separate Reconnaissance Battalion of the Kiev Special Military District in Chernigov. In February 1940 he became head of the regimental school of the 33rd Rifle Regiment of the 187th Rifle Division, and in April was appointed assistant chief of staff of the division's 1st staff department. In that year, he was awarded the Order of the Red Banner.

== World War II ==
At the beginning of Operation Barbarossa in June 1941, Shugayev was appointed assistant chief of staff of the 2nd staff department of the 45th Rifle Corps of the Western Front. Elements of the corps fought with the 13th Army in the defense of the Minsk Fortified Region, but were forced by German attacks to withdraw beyond the Berezina in the area of Borisov. Between July and September, the corps as part of the 13th Army with the Central and then Western Fronts fought in the Battle of Smolensk. From 5 September, Shugayev was temporary chief of staff and deputy commander of the 510th Rifle Regiment of the 154th Rifle Division of the Bryansk Front. In October the regiment with the division fought in the Oryol-Bryansk defensive operation against Operation Typhoon. In November, as part of the 50th Army, it participated in defensive battles near Tula, fighting in the Tula defensive operation. From December, during the counteroffensive near Moscow, the regiment and division as part of the 50th Army fought in the Tula and Kaluga Offensives, during which they helped recapture Kaluga. In February 1942, Shugayev, now a captain, was appointed regimental commander, distinguishing himself in battles in the area of Vyshnee and Barsuki between 13 and 14 February. On 13 February, in the battle for Vyshnee, Shugayev was reported by his superiors to have "personally led the regimental attack", which was credited with destroying several firing points and killing up to 180 German soldiers. On the next day, in the battle for height 186.1 near Barsuki, he was wounded, but remained in the action. For his actions, Shugayev was awarded the Order of the Red Banner on 28 February.

For its "courage in battle", the regiment was converted into the 142nd Guards Rifle Regiment on 23 October 1942, after the division became the 47th Guards Rifle Division. From April 1943, Shugayev, now a lieutenant colonel, temporarily served as chief of staff of the division for a month, before returning to his command. From July the 47th Guards, as part of the 34th Guards Rifle Corps of the 3rd Guards Army of the Southwestern Front, fought in the Izyum-Barvenkovo Offensive. In August, the division, transferred to the 26th Guards Rifle Corps of the 6th Army, fought in the Donbass Strategic Offensive, during which it participated in the recapture of Lozovaya, then fought in the assault crossing of the Dnieper in the area of the fortified point of Alekseyevka. For his leadership in the 14 October capture of Zaporozhye, Shugayev was awarded the Order of the Red Banner and promoted to colonel on 30 October. From November 1943, as part of the 4th Guards Rifle Corps of the 8th Guards Army of the 3rd Ukrainian Front, it fought in heavy offensive battles in Dnipropetrovsk Oblast. During January 1944, the 47th Guards participated in the Nikopol–Krivoi Rog Offensive. Between February and March, Shugayev, now a colonel, temporarily served as deputy chief of staff for the auxiliary command post of the 8th Guards Army. In the same position he participated in the Bereznegovatoye–Snigirevka Offensive, before taking temporary command of the 47th Guards on 27 March; his position was made permanent on 21 May.

He commanded the division during the Odessa Offensive of April, during which it helped recapture Odessa, and after the end of the operation, in June, the division was withdrawn with the corps and army to the Reserve of the Supreme High Command, then joined the 1st Belorussian Front for the Lublin–Brest Offensive. Breaking through German defenses west of Kovel, the 47th Guards captured Liuboml, and crossed the Western Bug and Vistula. During the latter, they captured the Magnuszew bridgehead. For his "exemplary performance of combat missions" and "personal courage" shown in the offensive, Shugayev was made a Hero of the Soviet Union and awarded the Order of Lenin on 6 April 1945. Severely on 29 August when his jeep blew up a mine, he was temporarily replaced by Major General Sobir Rakhimov between 3 September and 22 October while evacuated to Moscow for treatment. Shugayev was promoted to major general upon his return to the 47th Guards. During the Warsaw-Poznan Offensive in January 1945, the division captured Edminsk and Schwerin. From March it fought in the East Pomeranian Offensive and the Berlin Offensive, crossing the Spree and capturing Kustrin, Müncheberg, and Berlin.

== Postwar ==
After the end of the war, Shugayev continued to command the division. Entering the Higher Academic Courses at the Voroshilov Higher Military Academy in January 1946, he became commander of the 180th Rifle Division upon graduation in May 1948. In May 1951 Shugayev was dismissed from command and appointed deputy commander of the 36th Rifle Division of the Transbaikal Military District, and in July 1952 became division commander. He was retired for health reasons in May 1954, and moved to Kishinev, where he lived with his wife Anastasia Nikolayevna and son Vladimir. Shugayev was chairman of the veterans' council of the 47th Guards Rifle Division in his later years. He died on 21 November 1976 and was buried in the city's Central Cemetery.

== Awards and honors ==
- Hero of the Soviet Union
- Order of Lenin (2)
- Order of the Red Banner (3)
- Order of Suvorov, 2nd and 3rd classes
- Order of the Red Star (2)
