= Mulino (settlement), Nizhny Novgorod Oblast =

Rural locality in Nizhny Novgorod Oblast, Russia

Mulino Мулино
- Settlement
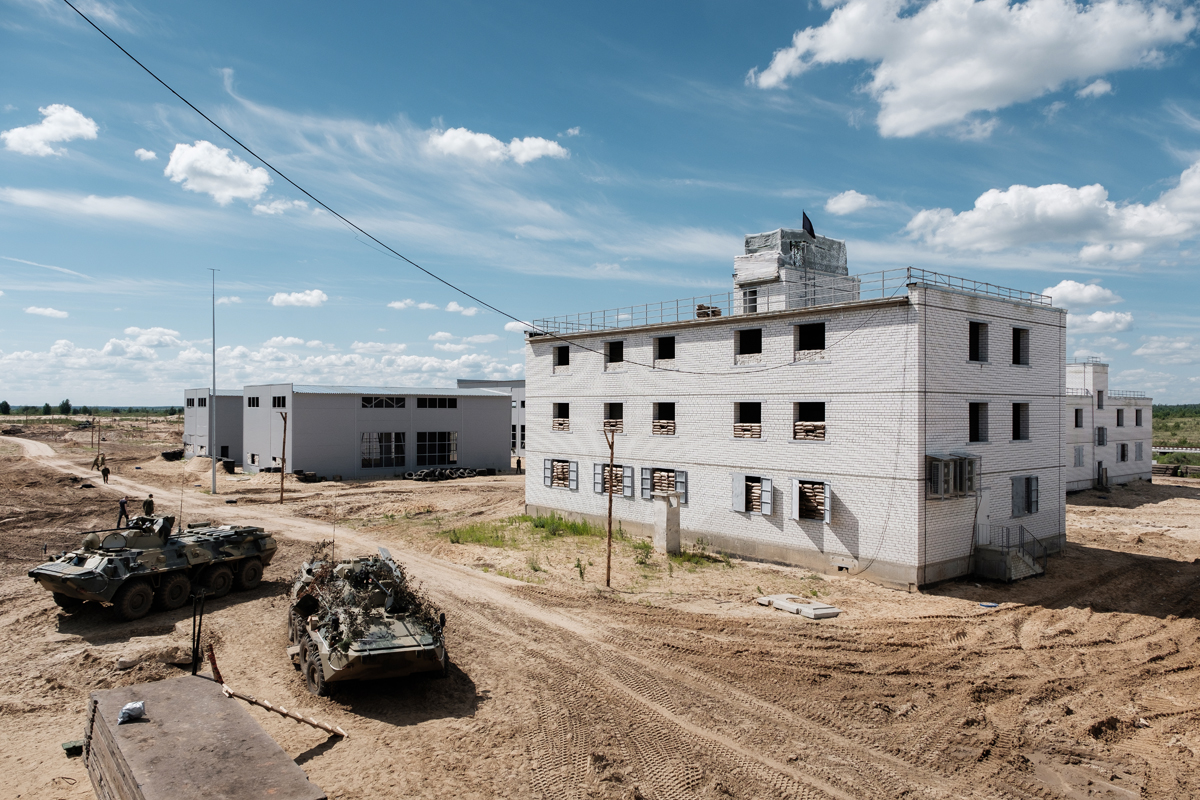
- Military training ground near Mulino

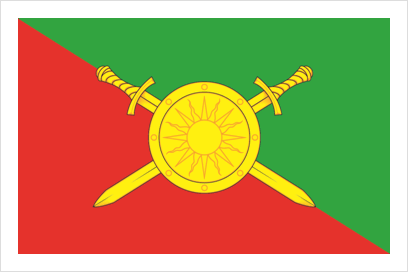
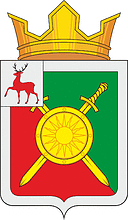
- Flag Coat of arms
- Interactive map of Mulino
- Location of Mulino Mulino (Nizhny Novgorod Oblast)
- Coordinates: 56°18′36″N 42°56′24″E
- Country: Russia
- Federal subject: Nizhny Novgorod Oblast
- Administrative district: Mulinsky Rural Settlement
- SettlementSelsoviet: Mulinsky Rural Settlement

Population
  - Estimate (2021): 8,446 )

Administrative status
  - Capital of: Volodarsky District

Municipal status
  - Urban settlement: Mulinsky Rural Settlement
- Time zone: UTC+3 (MSK)
- Postal code: 606083
- Dialing code: +7 83136
- OKTMO ID: 22631411101

Mulino (Russian: Му́лино) is a rural locality (a settlement) in Volodarsky District of Nizhny Novgorod Oblast, Russia. Population: 13,008 (2010 census); 11,711 (2002 census). Dialing code: +7 83136. Postal code: 606083.

== History ==
The settlement was founded in the 1930s. In the 1940s, a military unit was based on its territory. The first primary school was built on the site where the hospital is now located. A few years later, new buildings began to be built in the settlement, in particular a secondary school, brick houses for officers and their families. Initially, the area where the new buildings were built was considered the center of Mulino. The brick buildings were surrounded by the first wooden structures on all sides.

== Military ==
There is a significant military presence in the area; a local newspaper describes Mulino as "surrounded by military units". An important facility in the area is the Mulino training center of the Russian Ground Forces, which in September and December 2007 was the site of joint US-Russian military exercises, part of the series codenamed "Torgau" (after the city in Germany that figures in the military history of both countries). Joint exercises at Mulino were originally planned for 2006 ("Torgau-2006"), but were canceled, possibly due to the protests of certain local groups against the presence of foreign military on Russian soil.

Among military units listed by Kommersant-Vlast in 2002 at Mulino were the 34th Guards Artillery Division, the 99th Guards Self-Propelled Artillery Regiment (3 MRD), the 211th Training Artillery Brigade, the 245th Guards Motor Rifle Regiment (3 MRD), the 752nd Motor Rifle Regiment, the 237th and 100th Tank Regiments (3rd Motor Rifle Division), one other unit, and a penal battalion. Headquarters 3rd Motor Rifle Division was nearby in Nizhny Novgorod.

There is also a penal battalion at the site.

Several military reorganizations have now occurred. (Note: A listing of the reorganized units at Mulino can be accessed at МОСКОВСКИЙ ВОЕННЫЙ ОКРУГ) As of late 2009, units there appear to include 6th Tank Brigade (2022 partially transformed into the 26th Tank Regiment of the established 47th Tank Division), 288th Artillery Brigade, and a rocket forces and artillery depot.

In 2014 a new training range site was to be opened in Mulino, in accordance with a €100-million-plus agreement signed with Germany’s Rheinmetall to build a brigade-sized live combat simulation and marksmanship training center. Due to the Russo-Ukrainian war and sanctions imposed by European Union against Russia, Rheinmetall cancelled this agreement with the Russian armed forces.

The peak of the large-scale Zapad-2021 military exercises conducted by the Russian and Belarusian armies, was in Mulino.

== See also ==
- ru:Гороховецкий артиллерийский полигон - The Gorokhovets Artillery Research and Testing Range, located near the village of Mulino.
