= 26th Tank Regiment =

Russian Ground Forces formation

- 26-й танковый Феодосийский ордена Александра Невского полк
- Active: 1943–1997; 2021–present
- Country: Soviet Union (1943–1991); Russia (1991–1997; 2021–present)
- Branch: (Soviet Union) Soviet Army; Russian Ground Forces
- Type: Armoured
- Role: Armoured warfare
- Size: 1400–1500
- Part of: 47th Tank Division
- Garrison/HQ: Mulino
- Engagements: Russo-Ukrainian war; Russian invasion of Ukraine; Eastern front; Luhansk Oblast campaign
- Decorations: Order of Alexander Nevsky
- Battle honours: Feodosia

The 26th Tank Feodosia Order of Alexander Nevsky Regiment (Russian: 26-й танковый Феодосийский ордена Александра Невского полк) is an element of the Russian Ground Forces formed out of the armored core of the disbanded 6th Tank Brigade. It is part of the 47th Tank Division.

== History ==
=== World War II and Germany ===
The unit traces its history back to the 244th Separate Tank Regiment of the Red Army. The 244th Separate Tank Regiment was created in 1943. It participated in combat operations as part of the North Caucasian Front and the Separate Coastal Army. After the war in November 1945, it was transformed into the 26th Tank Regiment and became part of the 19th Guards Mechanized Division.

After 1957, it was part of the 26th Guards Tank Division. Before the dissolution of the USSR, it was stationed in Hillersleben, German Democratic Republic as part of the 47th Guards Tank Division. The regiment was armed with 95 T-64, 55 infantry fighting vehicles (12 BMP-2, 41 BMP-1, 2 BRM-1K), 2 armored personnel carriers (1 BTR-70, 1 BTR-60), 18 self-propelled guns 2S1, 6 mortars 2S12, 5 BMP-1KSh. After 1990, the unit moved to Russian and became part of the new Russian Armed Forces. In 1997, the regiment was disbanded.

=== Formation in 2021–22 ===
At the end of 2021, the 26th Feodosiya Order of Alexander Nevsky Tank Regiment was recreated at the site of the former 6th Separate Tank Brigade in the village of Mulino. The unit was spun out of the then disbanding 6th Tank Brigade in time for the 2021-2022 winter training program of the Russian army. The unit is subordinate to the recreated 47th Tank Division.

Their first training period was opened by Colonel General Alexander Zhuravlyov, commander of the Western Military District, and Lieutenant General Serhiy Kisel, then commander of the 47th Tank Division, as well as various local politicians from the Volodarsky District where their headquarters in Mulino is located.

== Russo-Ukrainian war ==
=== Russian invasion of Ukraine ===
According to a captured document dated 23 February 2022, the day before the Russian invasion of Ukraine, a unit of the 26th Regiment had been ordered to advance 250 miles (400 km) within 24 hours from the Russia–Ukraine border to a position on the Dnieper River two hours outside Kyiv.

==== March 2022: Operations in southern Kharkiv Oblast ====
On 17 March 2022, the Ukrainian military claimed to have stopped a Russian column as it was moving in the direction of Kamyanka, Kharkiv Oblast. It was said that the column consisted of military vehicles belonging to the 26th Tank Regiment's battalion tactical group, as well as the 437th Training Regiment.

On 30 March 2022, it was claimed by the Ukrainian military that many conscripts in the regiment had attempted to terminate their contracts after their experiences in combat in Ukraine.

==== 2023-2024: Operations in northeastern Kharkiv Oblast ====
In January 2023, the Ukrainian military claimed that one of the tank battalions of the 26th Tank Regiment, which was taking part in combat operations on the Kupyansk front, had only 30 soldiers and 10 T-80BV tanks remaining.

In February 2023, the 26th Tank Regiment operated on the Svatovo–Kupyansk front line. In October 2023, the regiment fought in the direction of Yagodnoe–Ivanovka of the Kupyansk district. In early February 2024, the 26th Tank Regiment attempted to break through the Ukrainian defense in the direction of the villages of Kyslovka–Kotlyarovka in the Kupyansk district of the Kharkiv region to encircle the Ukrainian group in Stepova Novoselovka, and the attack succeeded in May.
