= Donetske, Kharkiv Oblast =

Village in Kharkiv Oblast, Ukraine

Donetske Донецьке
- Village
- Interactive map of Donetske
- Location within Kharkiv Oblast Location within Ukraine
- Coordinates: 49°08′52″N 37°15′08″E
- Country: Ukraine
- Oblast: Kharkiv Oblast
- Raion: Izium Raion
- Hromada: Oskil rural hromada
- Elevation: 86 m (282 ft)

Population (2021)
  - Total: 235
- Time zone: UTC+2 (EET)
  - Summer (DST): UTC+3 (EEST)
- Postal code: 64343
- Area code: +380 5743

Donetske (Ukrainian: Донецьке) is a village in Izium Raion of Kharkiv Oblast in eastern Ukraine. It belongs to Oskil rural hromada, one of the hromadas of Ukraine.

== Demographics ==
Native language as of the Ukrainian Census of 2001:

- Ukrainian 84.68%
- Russian 11.91%
- Others 3.41%
