= 42nd Mechanized Brigade =

Ukrainian Ground Forces unit

- 42-га окрема механізована бригада імені Героя України Валерія Гудзя
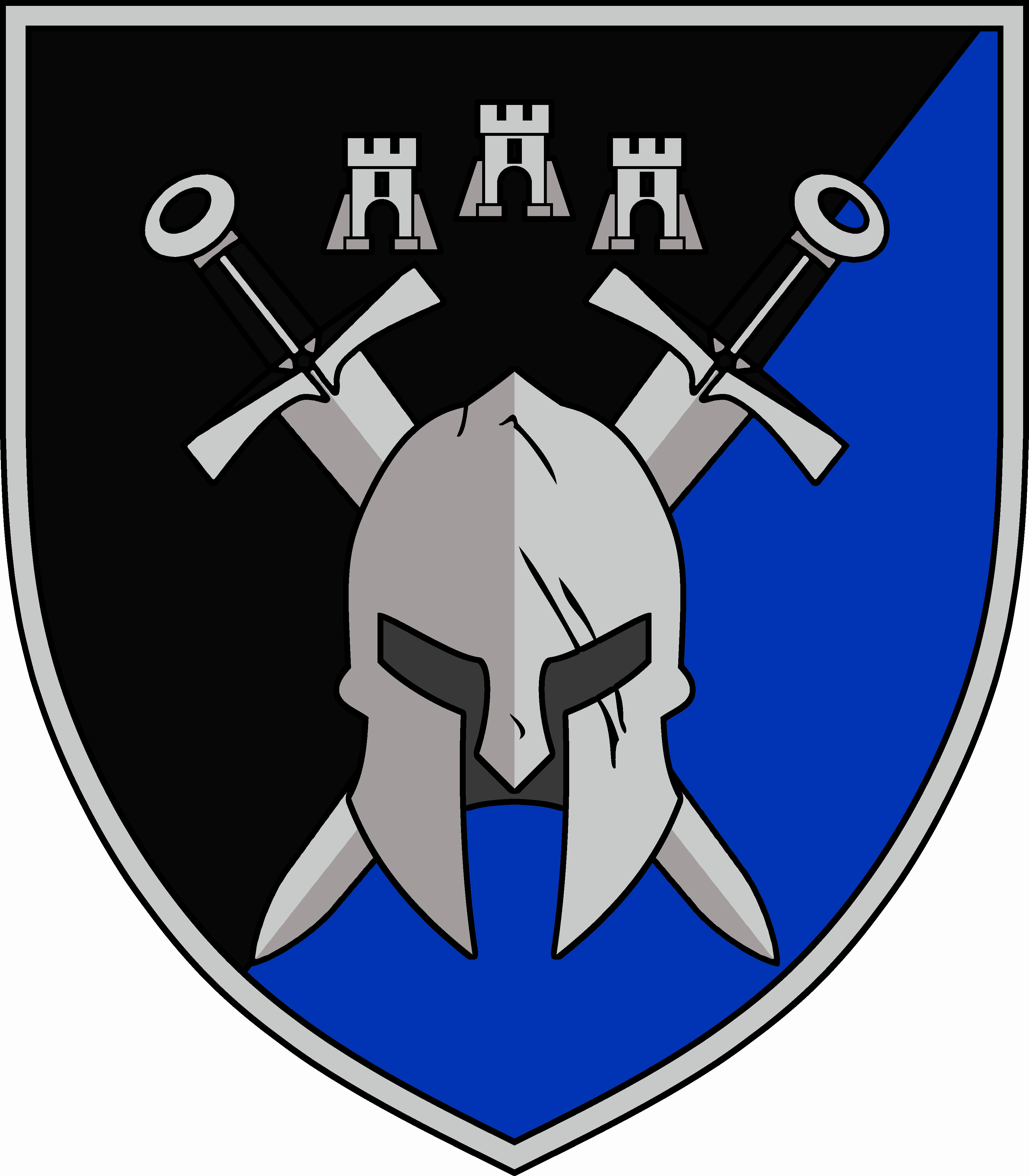
- Active: January 25, 2023 – Today
- Country: Ukraine
- Allegiance: Armed Forces of Ukraine
- Branch: Ukrainian Ground Forces
- Type: Mechanized Infantry
- Size: Brigade
- Part of: Operational Command West: 14th Army Corps
- Garrison/HQ: Chortkiv, Ternopil Oblast
- Nickname: Hero of Ukraine Valerii Hudz Brigade
- Patron: Valerii Hudz
- Mottos: With valor and weaponry
- Engagements: Russo-Ukrainian war; Russian invasion of Ukraine; Eastern front; Northern Kharkiv front
- Decorations: For Courage and Bravery
- Website: Website

Commanders
- Current commander: Lt. Col. Serhiy Lisovenko

The 42nd Separate Mechanized Brigade named after Hero of Ukraine Valerii Hudz is a mechanized infantry brigade of the Ukrainian Ground Forces.

== History ==
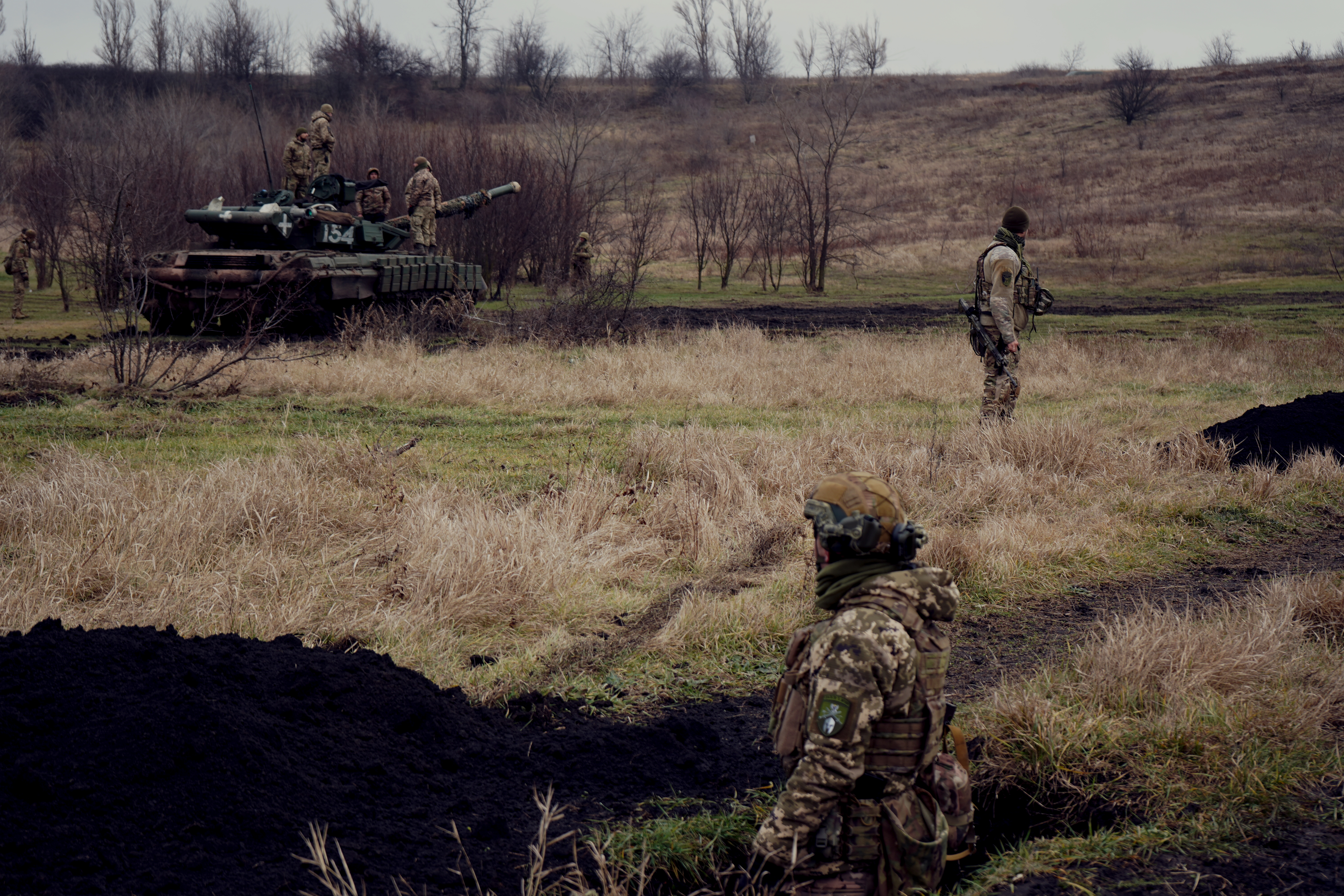
Soldiers of the 42nd Mechanized Brigade during training

The brigade was formed on January 25, 2023, as part of the expansion of the Ukrainian Army in anticipation of the 2023 Ukrainian counteroffensive, primarily from personnel mobilized in western Ukraine and officers from the 10th Mountain Assault Brigade. The command was entrusted to Lieutenant Colonel Volodymyr Bolechan, former commander of the 109th Battalion of the 10th Brigade. However, these were only equipped to one battalion, and the other two received the BMP-1LB, vehicles based on the MT-LB hull and equipped with a modern stabilized turret.

In September 2023 the brigade was deployed to the front for the first time, being sent together with the 44th Mechanized Brigade to the Kupiansk Raion to reinforce the Ukrainian defenses in the north. Starting from October it was deployed in the Andriivka area near Bakhmut. In the first months of 2024 they were part of the Ukrainian defense against the Russian winter offensive in the direction of Chasiv Yar.

=== 2024 Kharkiv offensive ===
The brigade was transferred to the Kharkiv region, on 9 May, providing support to the 125th Territorial Defense Brigade in repelling a Russian attacks near the village of Pylna reportedly its "Perun" drone unit destroyed 4 Russian BMPs along with personnel near Pylna, Hlyboke and Lukiantsi. Forced to give up ground in the following days, with the arrival of elements of the 92nd Assault Brigade it managed to stop the advancement of the 18th Motor Rifle Division by taking positions in the village of Lyptsi. The drone operators of the unit fly 20 kilometers deep into Belgorod Oblast to destroy enemy targets. A soldier from the brigade who goes by the callsign "Chirva", told The Washington Post that many scouts in the brigade had only been given 14 days of training before being sent into combat.

As of December 2024, the brigade was still fighting in the Kharkiv Oblast.

On 1 October 2025, on the occasion of Defenders Day, the brigade was awarded the honorary title named after Hero of Ukraine Valerii Hudz by decree of President Volodymyr Zelenskyy.

On 14 May 2026 the unit was awarded the honorary award For Courage and Bravery by the president.

== Structure ==
As of 2024 the brigade's structure is as follows:

- 42nd Mechanized Brigade,
  - Headquarters & Headquarters Company
  - 1st Mechanized Battalion
  - 2nd Mechanized Battalion
  - 422nd Separate Rifle Battalion (A4850)
  - 424th Rifle Battalion (А4856)
  - Tank Battalion (T-64)
  - Artillery Group "Gods of War" (“Боги війни)
    - Rocket Artillery Battery. (BM-21) Commander Captn. Mykola Kozachenko
    - Self-propelled Artillery Battery. Commander "Nazar".
  - Anti-Aircraft Defense Battalion
  - Reconnaissance Company
  - Unmanned Systems Battalion "Perun"
  - Engineer Battalion
  - Logistic Battalion
  - Signal Company
  - Maintenance Battalion
  - Radar Company
  - Medical Company
  - Chemical, Biological, Radiological and Nuclear Defense Company

== Insignia history ==
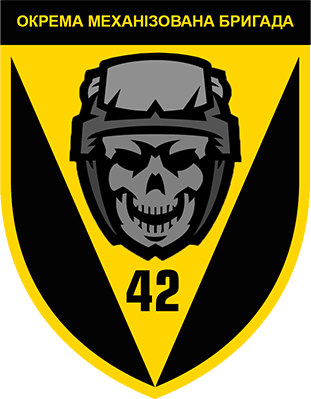
Original unit patch

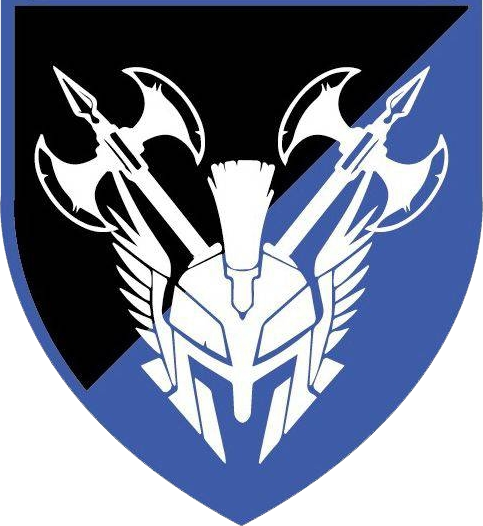
Old unit patch

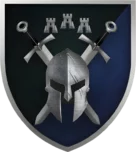
Officially approved variant, 2023
