= Saint Nicholas of Myra saves three innocents from death =

1888 painting by Ilya Repin

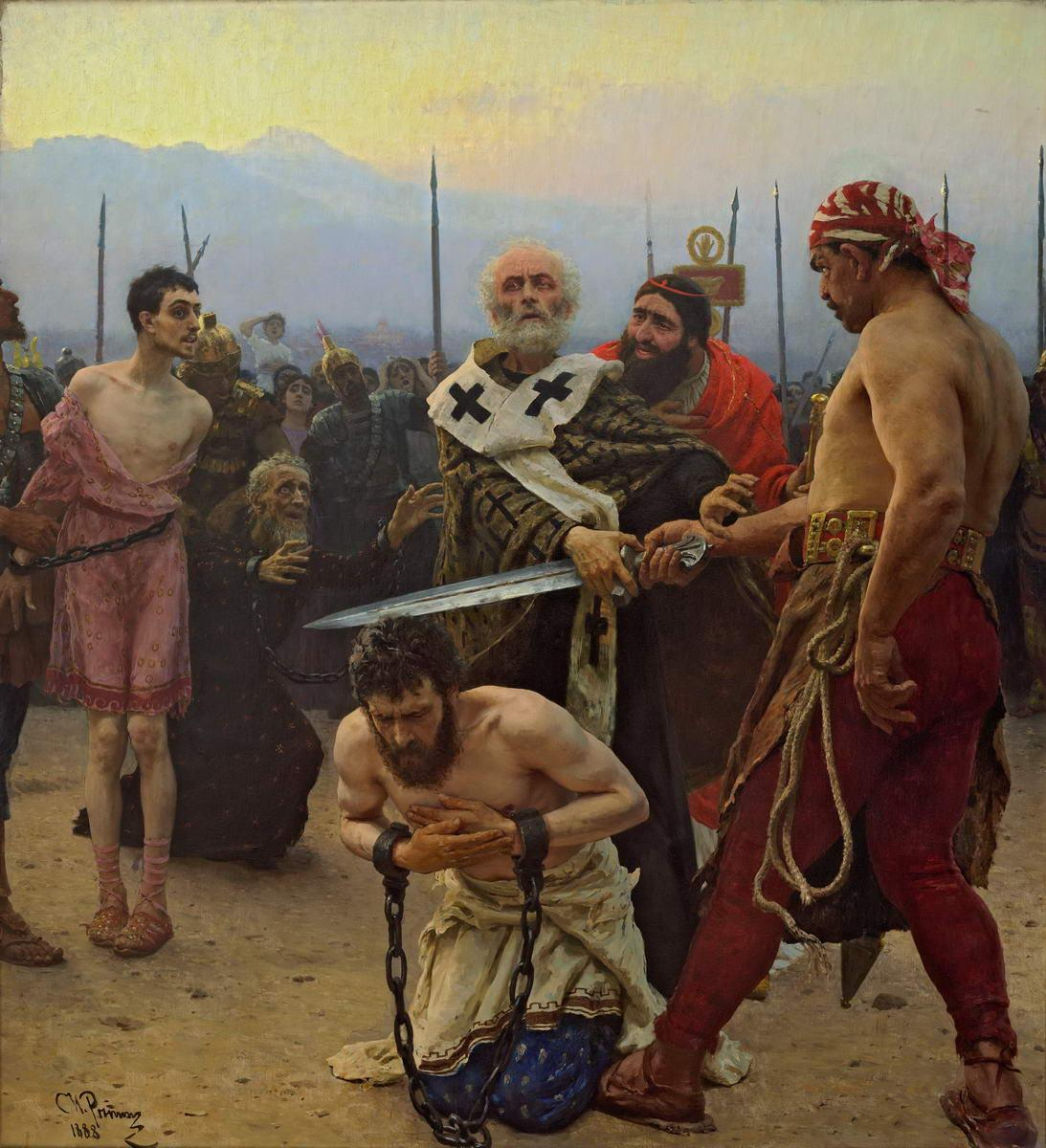
- Artist: Ilya Repin
- Year: 1888
- Medium: Oil on canvas
- Dimensions: 215 cm × 196 cm (85 in × 77 in)
- Location: Russian Museum, Saint Petersburg

Saint Nicholas of Myra saves three innocents from death is a painting by Russian artist Ilya Repin (1844–1930), completed in 1888. It is held at the Russian Museum in St. Petersburg (Inventory Zh-4001). The dimensions of the painting are 215 × 196 cm. The narrative of the painting is linked to one of the deeds of Saint Nicholas the Wonderworker (of Myra), whose courageous and principled actions helped to prevent the execution of three innocent people. The relevance of this theme was linked to Leo Tolstoy's moral teachings and the debate surrounding the abolition of the death penalty.

The canvas was presented at the 17th exhibition of the Society for Travelling Art Exhibitions ("Peredvizhniki"), which opened in February 1889 in St Petersburg. The critical response to the painting was mixed. The writer Mitrofan Remezov praised Repin's Saint Nicholas as the best of all the paintings presented at the exhibition "both in idea and execution", while Leo Tolstoy noted that the content of the canvas was "not artistic, not new, not dear to the author", "the whole picture is without focus, and all the figures crawl apart". The painting was purchased by Emperor Alexander III, and the decision to establish the Russian Museum was subsequently attributed to this purchase on numerous occasions.

According to art historian Nikolai Mashkovtsev, Nicholas of Myra should not be considered an icon or a religious work - "Repin was carried away to the point of self-forgetfulness by the expression of the actors, especially the convicts", and he shows "the initial, the strongest moment of mental impetus". Art historian Nonna Yakovleva noted that Repin "as if calling on the favourite holy wonderworker to stop the flow of blood in Russia, puts the audience in the face of one of his miracles".

== History ==
=== Background and creation ===
In 1884, Ilya Repin was commissioned by a nunnery near Kharkiv to create an image of Saint Nicholas of Myra. As the writer and historian Dmytro Yavornytsky recalled in a conversation with him, Repin mentioned that the person who commissioned the image of Nicholas the Wonderworker was the hegumen of the Nicholas Convent in the village of Strilecha, Kharkovsky Uyezd. This was the same convent where he had come to visit his cousin, who was a nun there. The artist's relative's name was Emilia, in monasticism Eupraxia, and Repin referred to her as Olympiada. According to some sources, she was Repin's paternal cousin and her surname was Borisova. Apparently, the order was timed to coincide with the 800th anniversary of the translation of the relics of Saint Nicholas from Myra to Bari, which was expected to be celebrated in 1887.

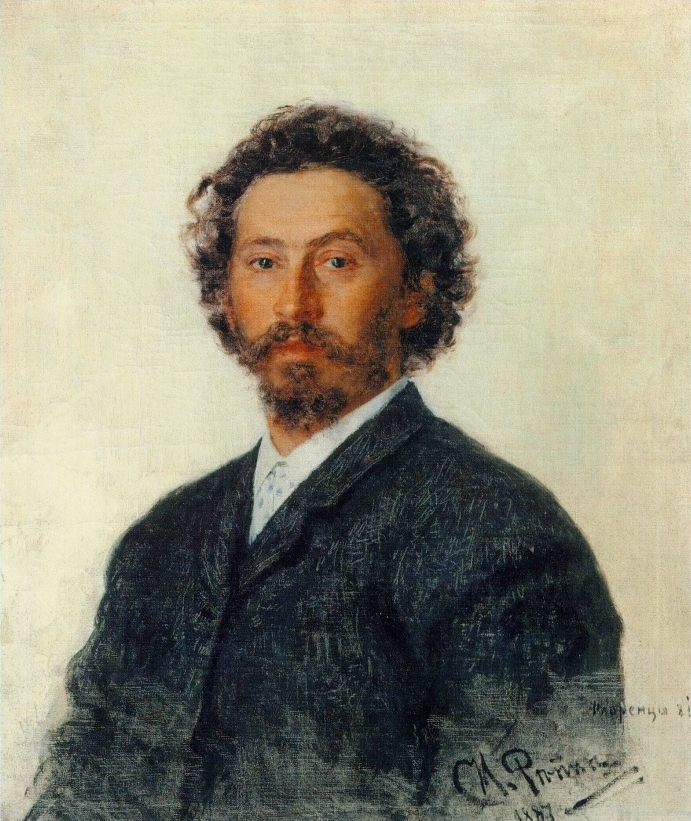
Repin, Self-Portrait, 1887; Tretyakov Gallery

Initially, Repin produced a pencil sketch in the style of icon painting. However, he subsequently became increasingly fascinated by this theme, which, as in the painting Ivan the Terrible and His Son Ivan, was associated with the moral preaching of Leo Tolstoy and the question of the abolition of the death penalty. In order to gather material, Repin appealed to art critic Vladimir Stasov, writing to him in a letter dated 30 September 1886: (Note: The Julian calendar ("old style") is used to date events that took place in the Russian Empire.) "Do not forget, please, if you find anything about Nicholas the Wonderworker, put it aside for me. I promised to one backwater convent in my homeland to write them an image in the church". It transpired that Repin commenced work on a large canvas, which he continued throughout the winter of 1886/1887 and the entirety of 1888. For the St Nicholas Convent, the artist was to create an author's reproduction of the painting, incorporating certain alterations.

During a trip to Western Europe in 1887, Repin visited Vienna and examined the art collection at the Belvedere Palace. In a letter to Vladimir Stasov dated 30 May 1887, the artist provided a detailed account of his impressions, particularly highlighting the works of Peter Paul Rubens, including Miracle of Saint Ignatius of Loyola and Miracles of St. Francis Xavier. According to art historian Tatiana Yudenkova, "the perception of these paintings reveals that Repin at that moment was looking for some "clues" in European art to solve the composition of Saint Nicholas of Myra saves three innocents from death".

Following his visit to Vienna, Repin proceeded to Italy, where he planned to visit Bari in particular. In a letter to Vladimir Chertkov dated 24 May 1887, the artist wrote about this: "In Italy I will now find a lot of material for my ventures. I am even thinking of visiting Bari, if there is something about Nicholas the Wonderworker...". In a letter to Pavel Tretyakov dated 17 August 1887 (after his return to St Petersburg), Repin wrote about the results of his trip: "Mainly I thought in Bari to find something for his St. Nicholas - there was nothing, but I do not regret the trip there, a lot of interesting was."

=== 17th travelling exhibition and subsequent events ===
The painting Saint Nicholas of Myra saves three innocents from death was completed in 1888. It was exhibited at the 17th exhibition of the Society for Travelling Art Exhibitions (Peredvizhniki), which opened on 26 February 1889 in St Petersburg and subsequently moved to Moscow in April of the same year. The part of the exhibition held in St Petersburg was hosted by Botkina at her residence on Sergievskaya Street (now Tchaikovsky Street). The Moscow part of the exhibition was held at the premises of the Moscow School of Painting, Sculpture and Architecture. The painting was catalogued in the exhibition catalogue under the title Saint Nicholas. (Saint Nicholas spares from the death penalty three innocently convicted in the city of Mirah-Likia). Additionally, three further paintings by Repin were exhibited at the same event - portraits of the actor M.S. Schepkin and the composers A.K. Glazunov and A.P. Borodin.

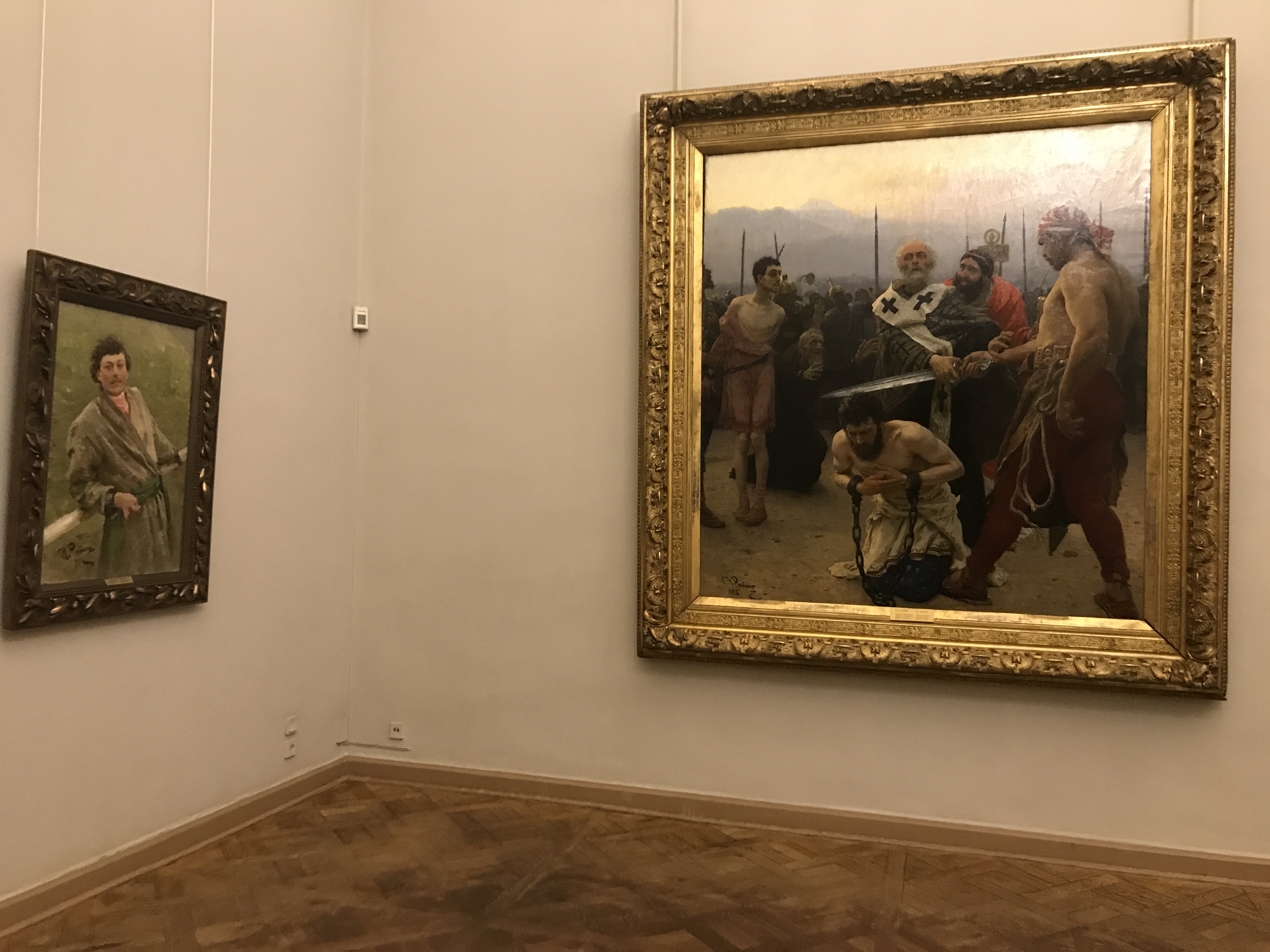
The painting Saint Nicholas of Myra saves three innocents from death in the Russian Museum (left - I.E. Repin's painting Belarusian).

According to the "legend," which has been repeatedly referenced in publications pertaining to the history of the Russian Museum, the final decision of Emperor Alexander III to establish the museum was influenced by the acquisition of the painting Saint Nicholas of Myra saves three innocents from death from the 17th exhibition of the Peredvizhniki. Prince Vladimir Meshchersky wrote in his memoirs: "The Emperor was very enthusiastic about the idea of the Museum and at this exhibition bought eight paintings, repeatedly saying that it's for the future Museum. After standing at one of the travelling exhibitions in front of Repin's painting Saint Nicholas Stopping an Unjust Execution, the Sovereign said: "Here is a beautiful thing for the Museum," and the painting was purchased."

In 1891, two of Repin's paintings, Nicholas of Myra and Seeing off the recruit, were exhibited at an international exhibition in Berlin, dedicated to the 50th anniversary of the Berlin Academy of Arts, where other works by Russian artists were displayed as well. Repin's paintings were well received by the public and critics alike. In particular, one of the reviewers observed that "never before has Russian art been represented in Germany by so many works, and none of them was received as [well as] Repin's St Nicholas of Myra." The art reviewer of the Berlin newspaper National-Zeitung, Georg Voß, wrote that the canvas St Nicholas is "full of such an amazing power of colour, which is found only maybe in Böcklin himself."

In 1897, the painting was transferred from the Winter Palace to the then emerging Russian Museum of Emperor Alexander III (now the Russian Museum), where it remains today. As Alexander III himself was no longer alive in 1897 (he died in 1894), the painting is considered to have been a gift from his son Nicholas II (the catalogue states that it came from the Winter Palace). The painting is currently on display in Hall 34 of the Mikhailovsky Palace, where it is exhibited alongside other renowned works by Repin, including Reply of the Zaporozhian Cossacks, Seeing off the recruit and portraits of V.V. Stasov, A.G. Rubinstein and I.R. Tarkhanov.

The painting Saint Nicholas of Myra saves three innocents from death was exhibited at Repin's personal exhibition held in 1936 at the State Tretyakov Gallery in Moscow. Additionally, the painting was exhibited at the 175th anniversary of Repin's birth, held from March to August 2019 at the New Tretyakov Gallery on Krymsky Val, and then, from October 2019 to March 2020, at the Benois Building of the State Russian Museum in St Petersburg.

== Subject and description ==
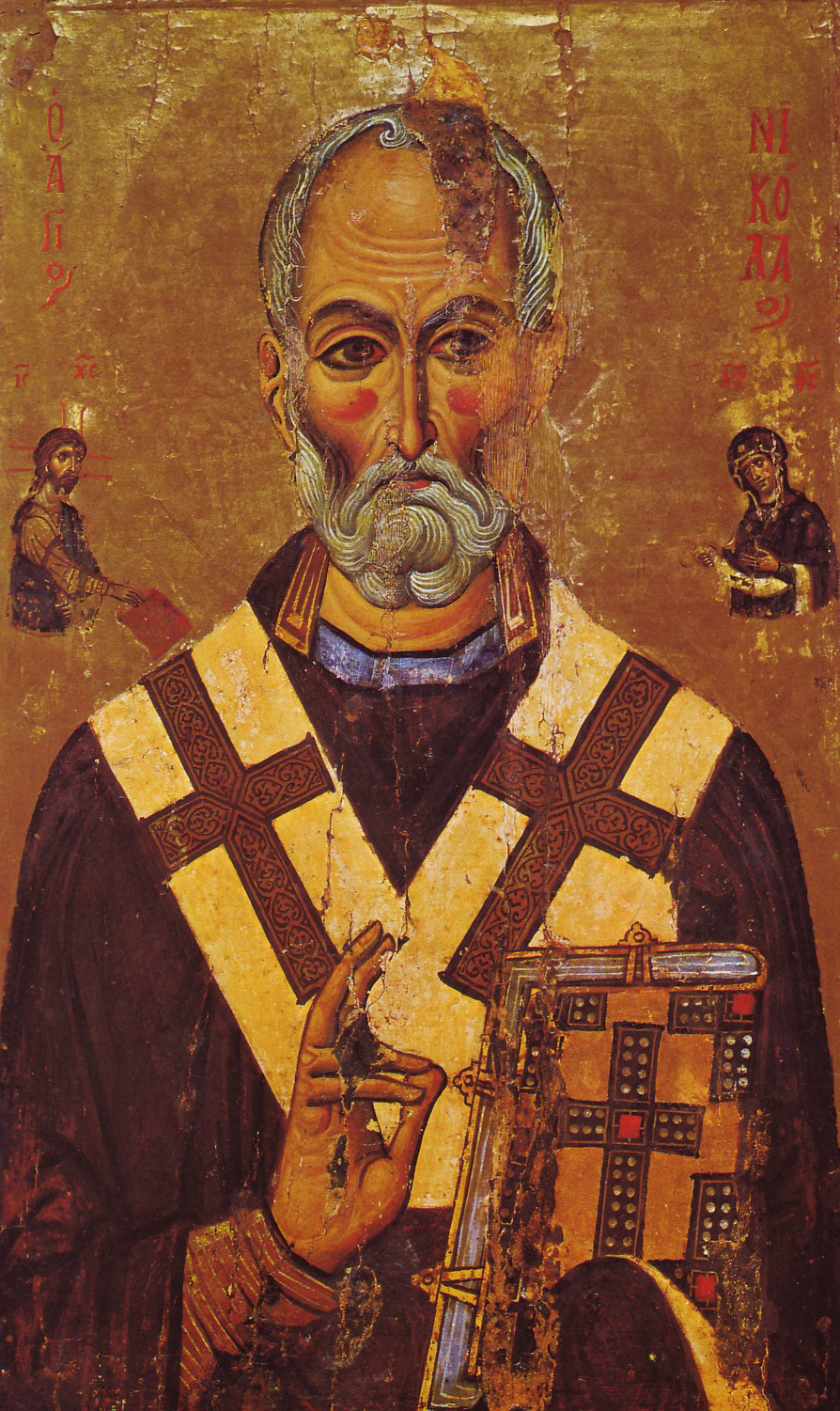
Saint Nicholas on a 13th century icon (Saint Catherine's Monastery, Sinai, Egypt)

The painting's narrative is based on one of the deeds of Saint Nicholas the Wonderworker (approximate dates of life - 270-345 AD), which he performed while serving as bishop in Myra, a city located in Lycia (present-day Turkey, specifically the Turkish province of Antalya). The famous nickname of St Nicholas - "Myrrh of Myra" - is linked to the name of this town.

While he was away, Nicholas of Myra heard that the governor of Myra, Eustathius, had condemned three innocent people to death after being bribed by their ill-wishers. Anxious to stop this injustice, Nicholas hurried back to Myra and arrived at the Dioscurov field where the execution was to take place, just as the executioner was about to begin.

In his work, The Life and Works of our Holy Father Nicholas the Wonderworker, the 10th-century Byzantine writer Symeon the Metaphrast offers the following account of the story: "When the saint saw this, and turned his eyes to the sad spectacle, he balanced his severity with gentleness, said neither a bold nor a harsh word, but neither did he show any apprehension or timidity; as much as his strength reached he ran to the executioner, boldly snatched the sword from his hands, and, fearing nothing, threw it to the ground, and set the condemned free from their chains. No one prevented his autocratic act...".

The painting depicts the moment when Nicholas the Wonderworker intervenes to halt the executioner's blade as it is about to strike the first of the condemned. The painting presents a stark contrast between the unwavering conviction of Nicholas of Myra, confident in his righteousness, the bewilderment of the executioner, the frightened and flattered expression on the face of the town governor ("Byzantine kingmaker"), and the figures and faces of the condemned, who had lost all hope of salvation - "one submissive, another bewildered and a third in a burst of mad hope".

The painting depicts a crowd of people at the rear of the scene, their expressions indicating a tense observation of the events unfolding in the foreground. Above the heads of the people in the crowd is the figure of a child who has been lifted up by someone so that he can see better and remember "all the details of the great feat of humanity". One of the girls in the crowd is trying not to lose sight of the young convict (he could be her brother or fiancé). Mentioning this girl in one of his letters to his pupil, the artist Vera Veryovkina, Repin wrote: "But what struck me: the girl is a perfect portrait of you!" According to Veryovkina's recollections, Repin deliberately took her to the Russian Museum of Alexander III to introduce her to her "double".

Although the prototype of Nicholas of Myra appears to have been Leo Tolstoy, with whom Repin talked quite a lot during that period, the face of St Nicholas was painted from the poet Apollon Maykov. Repin wrote the executioner from the artist Nikolai Kuznetsov. The image of the kneeling condemned to death was created from the writer Ieronim Yasinsky, and the puny young death row inmate awaiting his turn was created from the Symbolist writer Dmitry Merezhkovsky.

Actors

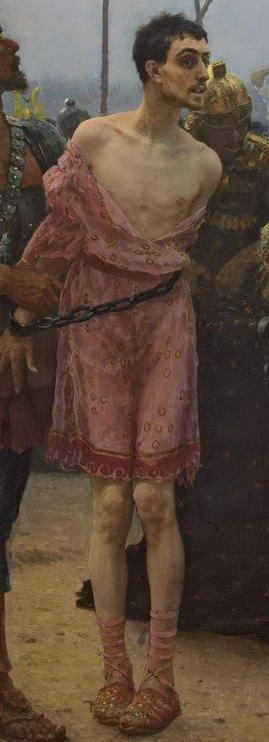
Young convict

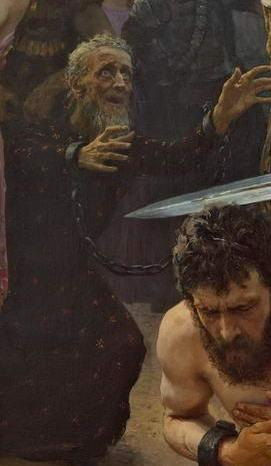
Old convict

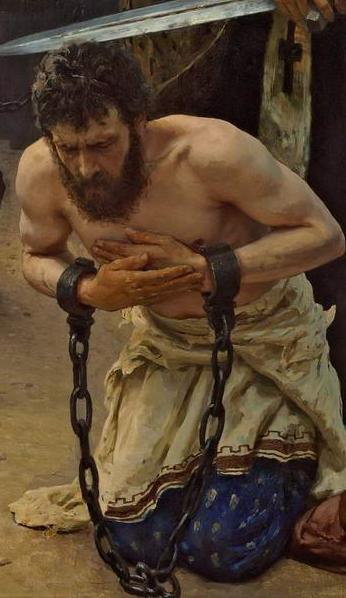
A convict with a sword hanging over him

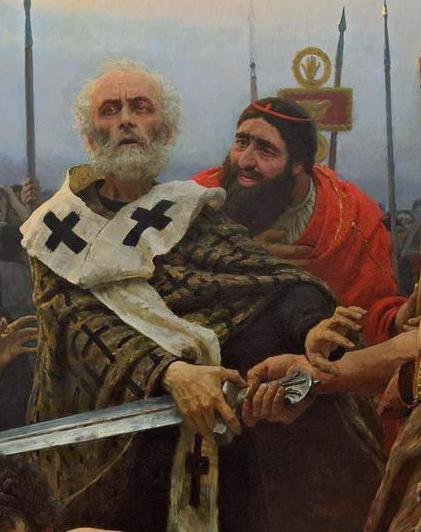
St Nicholas of Myra (on the left) and the town governor

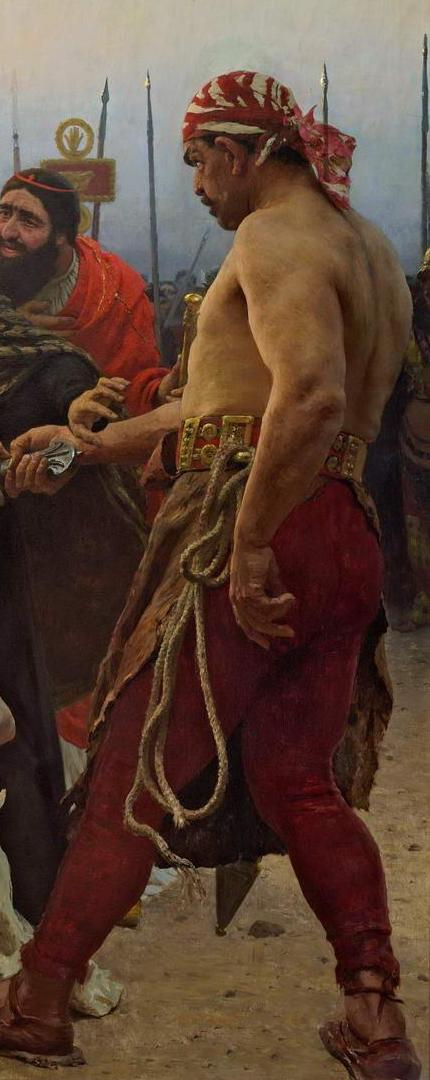
Executioner

== Sketches, studies and repetitions ==
=== Variations ===
In 1890, Repin created a variation of this painting, which is currently housed in the Kyiv Picture Gallery (canvas, oil, 215 × 198 cm, inv. Zh-143). The painting was donated by the artist for an exhibition held in Moscow in 1891, aimed at raising funds for starving peasants. It was purchased by Fyodor Tereshchenko. This version was presented at the All-Russia industrial and art exhibition, which opened on 28 May 1896 in Nizhny Novgorod. In a letter to Alexander Zhirkevich dated 4 September 1896, Repin provided details regarding the Nizhny Novgorod exhibition: "My St. Nicholas was pulled out of Kiev. This failed version I donated in favour of the starving, and it was bought at auction by Tereshchenko for 5000 r[ubles]. I would never have sent it to this national exhibition." Later on, Fyodor Tereshchenko's collection, including this painting, became part of the collection of the Kyiv Museum of Russian Art (now the Kyiv Picture Gallery).

Furthermore, in 1890 Repin created a smaller iteration of the painting, which is currently housed in the Kharkiv Art Museum (paper on canvas, oil, 126 × 98 cm). This is the version of the painting that was created by Repin for the Nicholas Convent in the village of Strilecha (Streletchina). In August 1930, the monastery was closed, after which many icons and paintings were dismantled by local residents. In 1934, the painting St Nicholas of Myra was discovered in the residence of the chairman of the local council in Lyptsi. The chairman subsequently failed to return the painting promptly, instead concealing it in a storage room. The painting was only handed over to the state in 1935 and subsequently placed in the Kharkiv Museum.

Author's variations of the painting

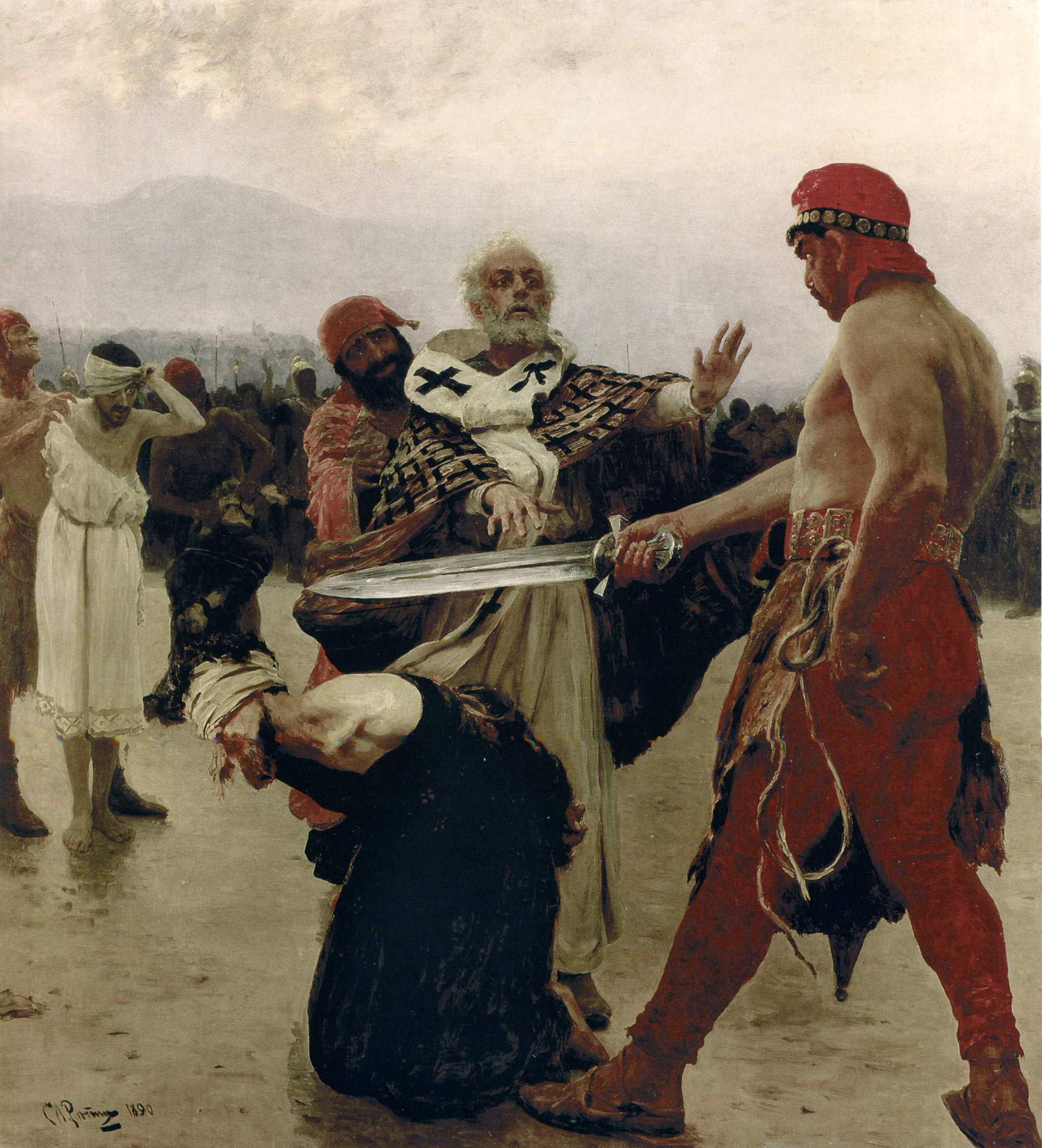
Version of the painting (1890, Kyiv Picture Gallery)

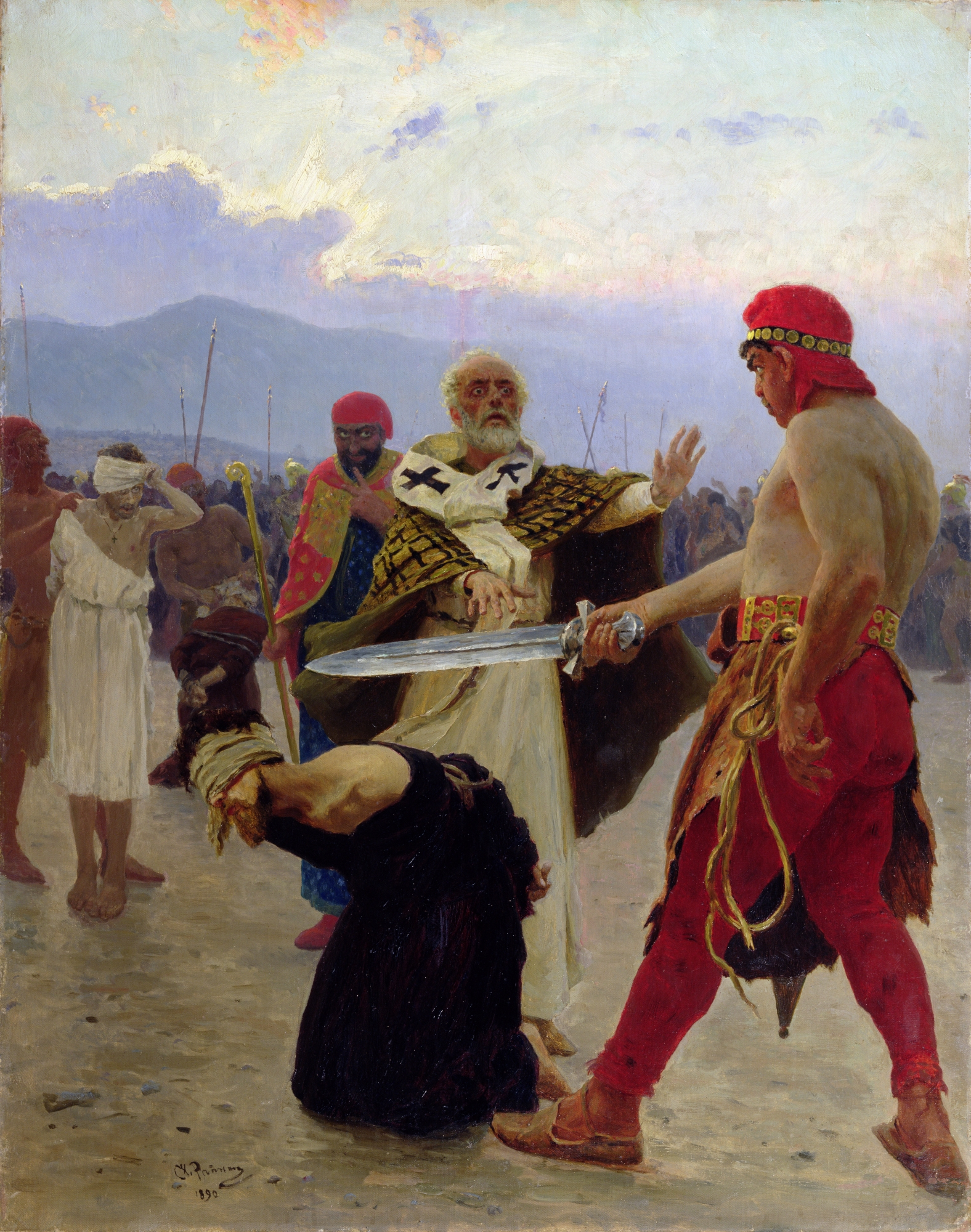
Version of the painting (1890, Kharkiv Art Museum)

In the opinion of art historian Galina Elshevskaya, the alterations evident in the two subsequent versions may have been prompted by the influence of Leo Tolstoy: "if in the first version of the painting the saint draws the executioner's sword, so to speak, purely physically, then in the last two versions the artist's favourite theme of the duel of views appears - and the executioner, defeated by the moral superiority of his opponent, stops the procedure himself". Nevertheless, according to art historian Olga Lyaskovskaya, the two later versions are considerably weaker than the painting from the Russian Museum: "in them the hysterical note is extremely strengthened, Nicholas himself no longer intervenes in the course of events, he only persuades; the courageous image of the condemned man has been replaced by a figure of a completely different content".

Another variation of the painting Saint Nicholas of Myra saves three innocents from death was created by Ilya Repin's students under his direct supervision. In October 1900, following an inspection of Repin's paintings in the Tretyakov Gallery, the writer Alexei Maximovich Gorky requested permission from the artist to create copies of some of the paintings. In 1901, all the copies completed, and in 1908, they were transferred to the Nizhny Novgorod Museum of Art and History. As a consequence of the museum's restructuring between 1924 and 1934, part of the collection was lost. As of 2006, the repetition of St. Nicholas of Myra was retained within the collection of Saratov collector S. A. Tarasov. The painting was exhibited at the "exhibition of one painting," held from April 27 to June 1, 2006, at the Radishchev Art Museum in Saratov.

=== Sketches and studies ===
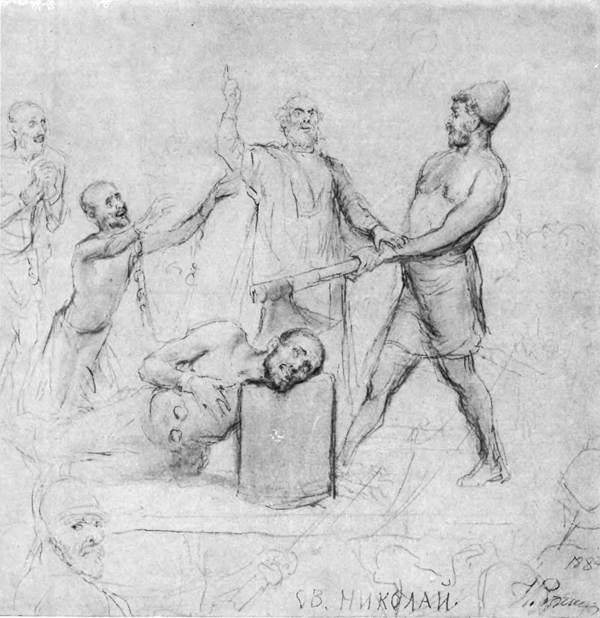
Pencil sketch (1886, State Tretyakov Gallery)

The State Tretyakov Gallery collection includes a graphic sketch of the painting Saint Nicholas of Myra saves three innocents from death, which was previously in the collection of businessman and philanthropist Mikhail Ryabushinsky. Despite the inscription indicating 1884, the prevailing view among art historians is that this date is erroneous and that the pencil sketch should instead be dated 1886. The sketch features five actors, including three condemned men, Nicholas of Myra and the executioner. Notably absent from the main characters is the town governor. In contrast with the final iteration of the painting, the condemned man with a sword does not kneel, but rather lies with his head resting on the scaffold. In addition to the original sketch, the literature makes mention of two further pencil sketches from 1887, one of which is kept in the Tretyakov Gallery, as well as another sketch from 1888. A sketch for the author's repeat from the Kyiv Picture Gallery is held in the State Russian Museum (canvas, oil, cardboard, 34.2 × 28.7 cm, about 1889, inv. Zh-7907).

The Ateneum in Helsinki houses a study for the image of St Nicholas of Myra named Saint Nicolas (1888, oil on canvas, 30 × 24 cm, inv. A-1995-85). The study was acquired with the collection of Wäinö Valle (Finnish: Wäinö Wallin kokoelma).

In the course of his work on the painting and the artist's subsequent repetitions, Repin created a number of graphic studies. Several drawings are preserved at the Ateneum in Helsinki, including two studies for the image of Nicholas of Myra, one from 1889 (paper, pencil, 31 × 23.5 cm, Inventory A III 1754:13), and one undated (paper, pencil, 31 × 23.5 cm, Inventory A III 1754:18), as well as a study for an image of a young convict (1895?, paper, pencil, 31 × 23.5 cm, Inventory No. A III 1754:17), and a study A Young Man (1889, paper, pencil, coloured crayons, 18.2 × 13.5 cm, Inventory No. A III 1754:16).

Sketch and studies for different versions of the painting

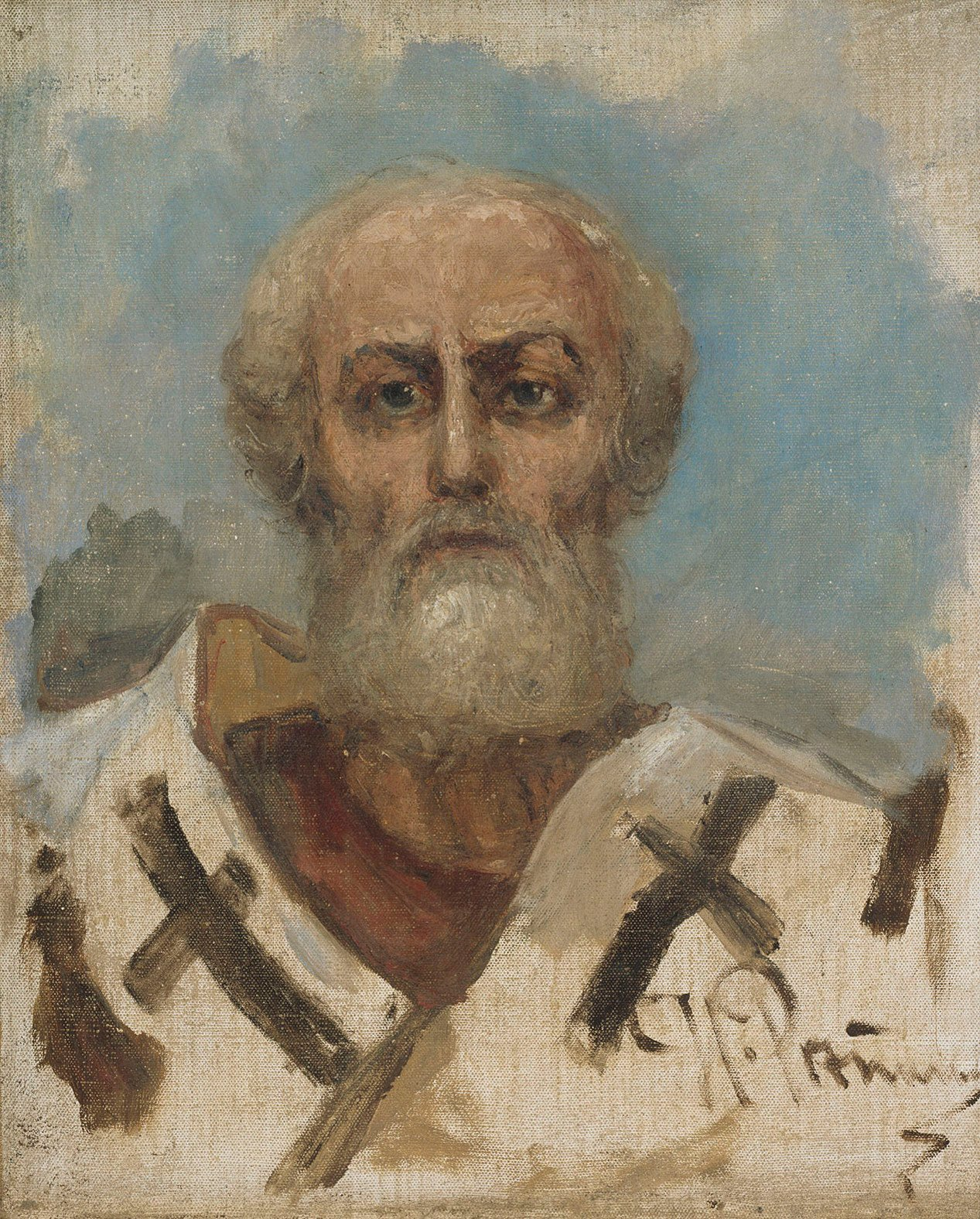
Saint Nicolas (1888, Ateneum)

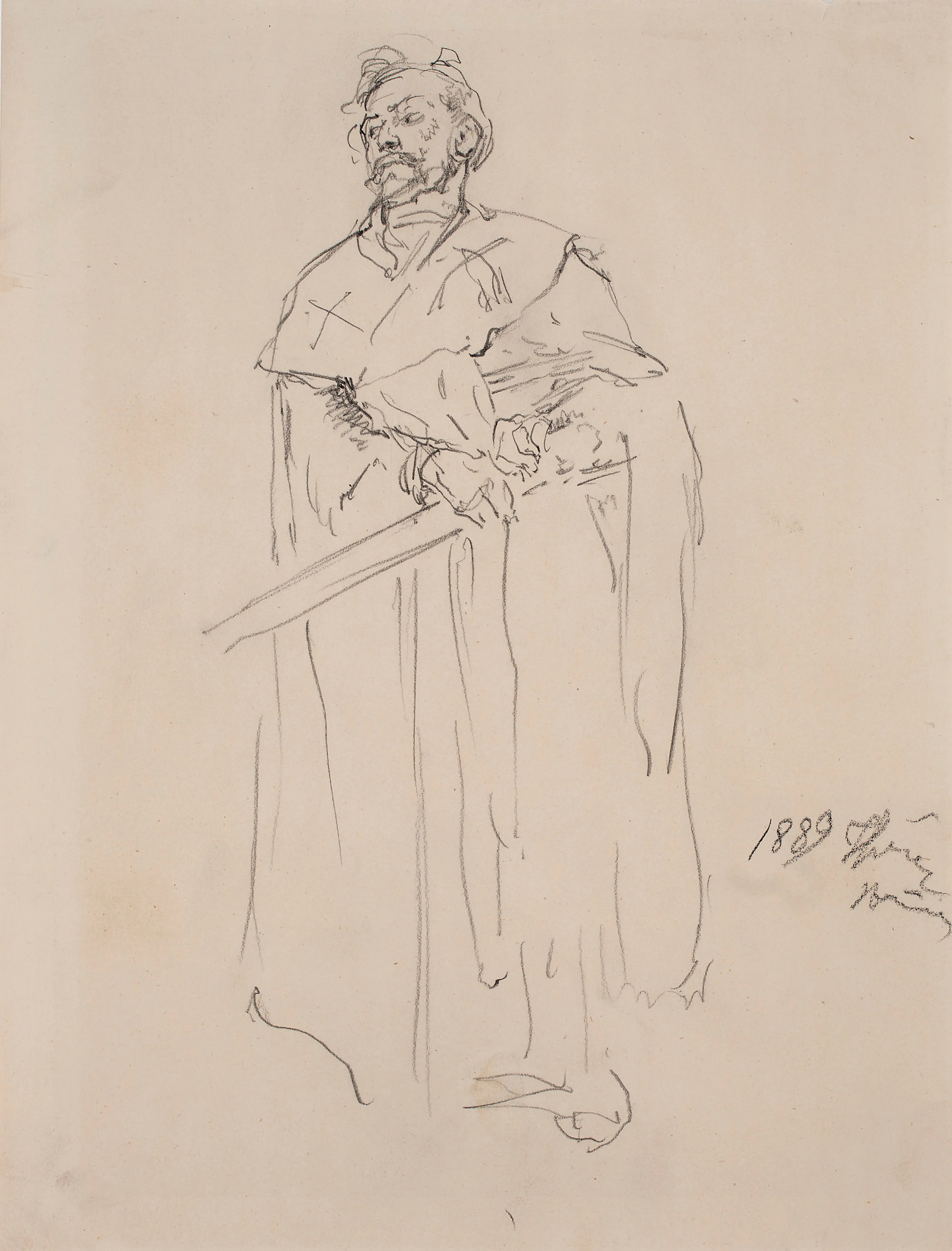
Study (1889, Ateneum)

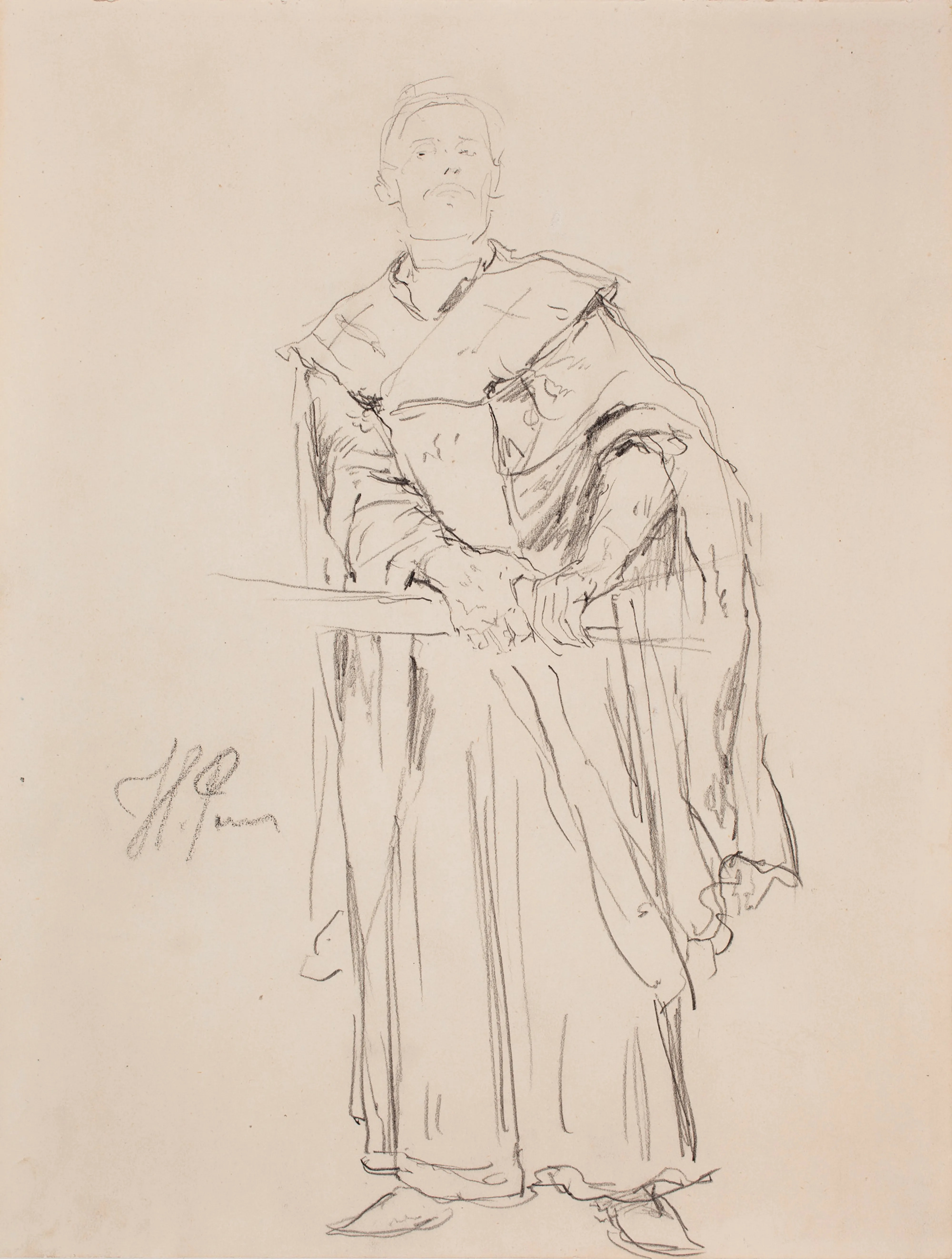
Study (not dated, Ateneum)

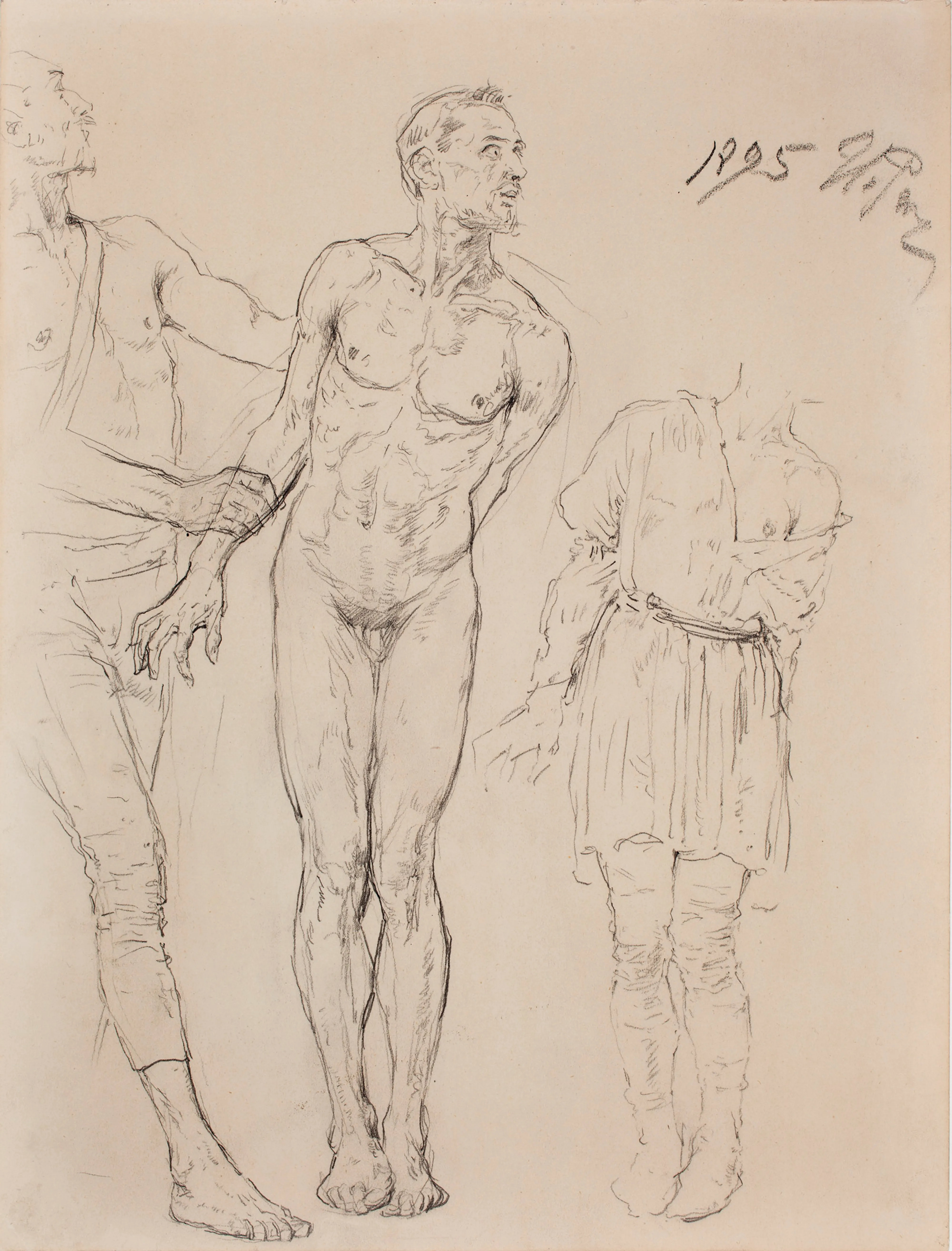
Study, (1895?, Ateneum)

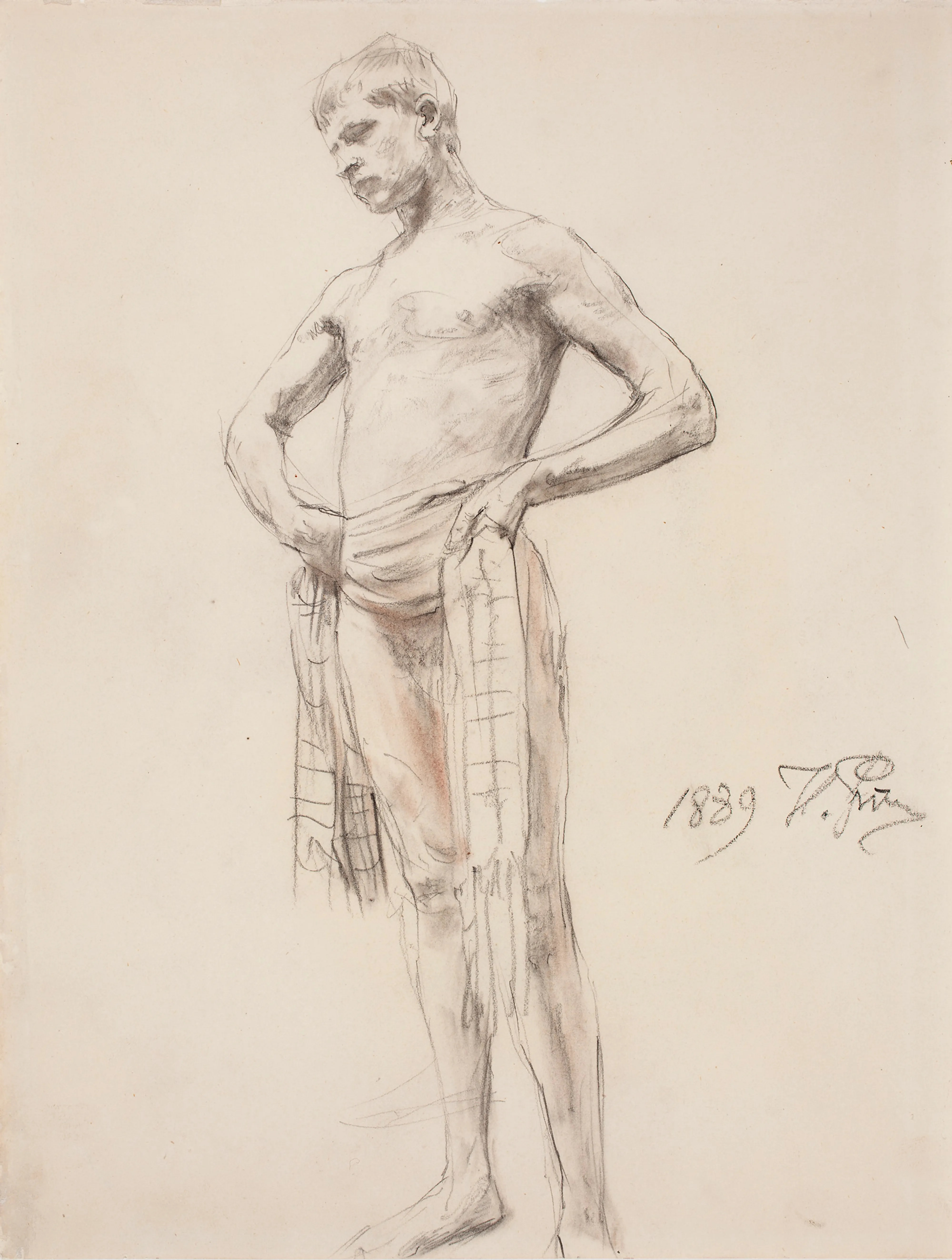
A Young Man (1889, Ateneum)

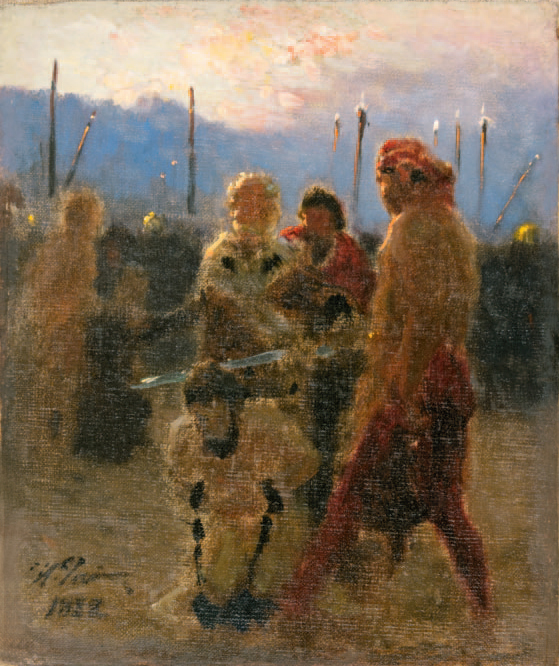
Sketch (circa 1889, Russian Museum)

== Reviews and criticism ==
=== 19th century ===
Upon the painting's appearance at the 17th Peredvizhniki exhibition, the writer Nikolai Leskov wrote to Repin (the letter is dated 27 February 1889), "I greet the great and undoubted success of your works. At the exhibition, there is nothing better than 'St Nicholas' and Glazunov's portrait. The praise for you is unanimous. The paintings are priced beautifully, and they need no better." In the same letter, Leskov cited the opinion of journalist and critic Aleksey Suvorin, noting that "Suvorin was delighted with 'St Nicholas'", then continued: "The crowds at 'St Nicholas' are not thinning, and the talk is very curious and unexpected - for example, that you want to 'show the supremacy of the church over the state'." - If it is true that you have been given only ten thousand for 'St. Nicholas', it is very cheap, especially in view of the price of the 'Phryne'." In this instance, Leskov was making reference to Henryk Siemiradzki's large-format painting, entitled Phryne at the Festival of Poseidon in Eleusis. This painting was purchased by the Ministry of the Imperial Court in the same year for 50,000 roubles.

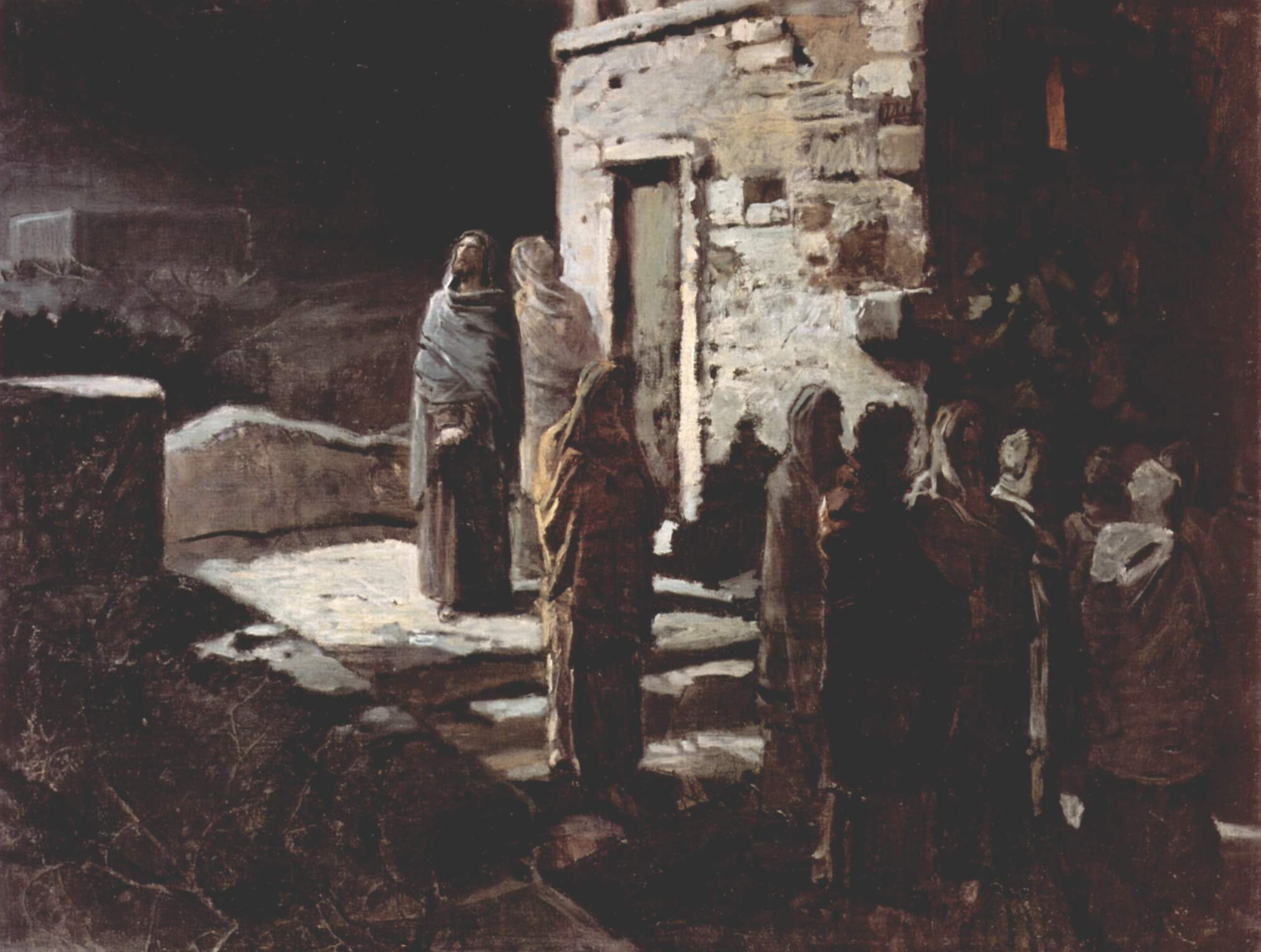
Nikolai Ge, Agony in the Garden, 1888; Tretyakov Gallery

In an article published in the journal Russian Mind (May 1889 issue), the writer Mitrofan Remezov offered high praise for Repin's Saint Nicholas, considering it the best of all the canvases presented at the 17th travelling exhibition. In his opinion, "at the exhibition, this painting, both in thought and execution, occupies the first place". Discussing the image of Nicholas of Myra, Remezov noted that "it was not the physical strength of the elder bishop that prevented the execution, but the great spiritual power, with amazing skill expressed by the artist in the countenance and in the whole figure of the saint". Furthermore, the writer commended other images, particularly the portrayal of the "full-motion figure of the condemned old man in fetters, falling to his knees and stretching out his hands," as well as the depiction of the exhausted young man, "morally exhausted to the point that he no longer quite clearly understands the meaning of what is happening before his eyes."

Leo Tolstoy visited the exhibition as well. In a letter to the artist Nikolai Ge, who presented a painting at the same exhibition entitled Christ praying in Gethsemane, Tolstoy wrote, comparing this canvas to Repin's painting (the letter is dated 21 April 1889): "A striking illustration of what art is, at the present exhibition: a your painting and Repin's. In R[epin's] it is represented that a man in the name of Christ stops an execution, i.e. does one of the most striking and important things." In a subsequent passage of the same letter, Tolstoy offers a favourable assessment of Ge's painting while simultaneously offering a critique of Repin's work: "Repin said what he wanted to say, so narrowly, so tightly, that it could be said even more accurately in words. It is said, and nothing more. He prevented the execution, so what? Well, he prevented it. And then? But not only that: since the content is not artistic, not new, not dear to the author, even that is not said. The whole painting is out of focus, and all the figures creep apart." Commenting on these words of Tolstoy, art historian Galina Elshevskaya wrote that Repin "got carried away with the psychology of the 'last minutes', and in the realistic narration of human affects... not only the preachy and edifying overtones of history were removed, but also its high taste in general"

=== 20th and 21st centuries ===
In the chapter dedicated to Repin in his book "History of Russian Painting in the XIX century", the artist and critic Alexandre Benois noted that "the weak point of 'St Nicholas' - the banal expression of the saint, the caricature of the rest", but at the same time, "the only successful place - the sneaky grimace of a Byzantine kingmaker". Benois identified Repin's paintings Sadko (1876, Russian Museum) and Nicholas of Myra as illustrative examples of the selection of themes that were arguably premature for the 1870s and 1880s, indicating that their author "was not at heart a faithful son of the travelling church" and that "he was drawn to other, more exalted spheres".

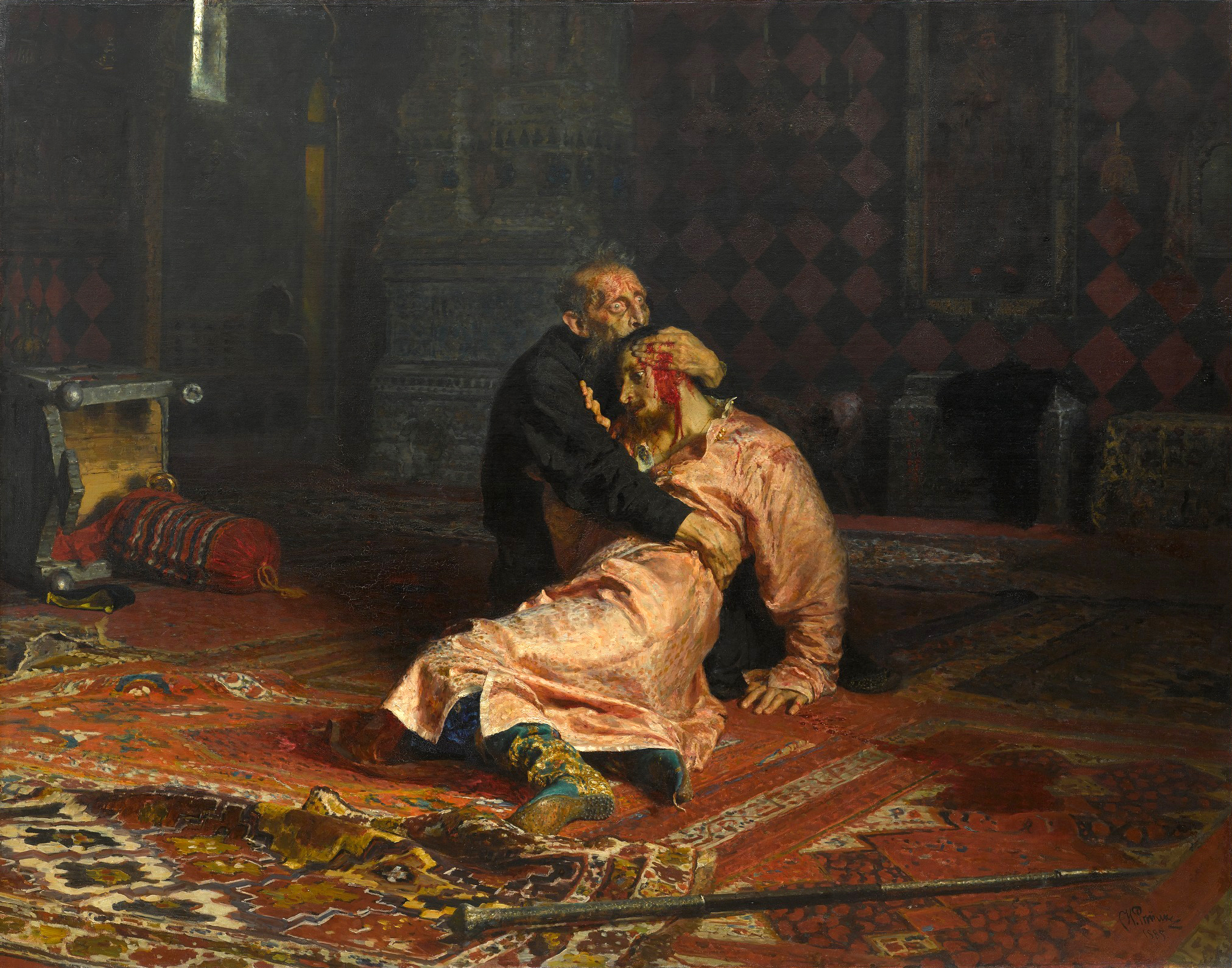
Repin, Ivan the Terrible and His Son Ivan, 1883–1885; Tretyakov Gallery

In the view of art historian Nikolai Mashkovtsev, the painting Saint Nicholas of Myra saves three innocents from death is not an icon or a work on a religious theme. Its power lies elsewhere. According to Mashkovtsev, "Repin was fascinated to the point of self-forgetfulness by the expression of the actors, especially the condemned: one, ready to take the blow of the sword, and the other, whose face expresses extreme mental shock". Mashkovtsev wrote that the artist depicted "the initial, the strongest moment of mental shock" on the canvas, and that is the essence of the work.

The critic Boris Asafiev (literary pseudonym - Igor Glebov) wrote: "When he [Repin] exhibited at the travelling exhibition of 1889 a remarkable painting "Saint Nicholas of Myra saves from death penalty three innocents in the city of Myra of Lycia", very few people understood that the point here is not in an act of mercy and not in the innocents (which painting can not show), but in the psyche of the people over whom the sword hangs. And not to forget the look of one of the executed - a look of flickering, trembling hope!..."

Discussing the subtle inner connection between Repin's paintings Nicholas of Myra and Ivan the Terrible and His Son Ivan, art historian Nonna Yakovleva wrote that the former is a kind of antithesis to the latter, because it "reminds of the need to stop death, a call to mercy, which alone can resist evil." Emphasising the fact that Nicholas of Myra is a native image for the Russian people, Yakovleva noted that Repin "as if calling upon the favourite holy wonderworker to stop the flow of blood in Russia, puts the audience in the face of one of his miracles."

== Bibliography ==
- Asafyev, Boris (1966). Русская живопись. Мысли и думы [Russian painting. Thoughts and ponderings] (in Russian). Moscow - Leningrad: Iskusstvo.
- Benois, Alexandre (1995). История русской живописи в XIX веке [History of Russian painting in the 19th century] (in Russian). Moscow: Республика. ISBN 5-250-02524-2.
- Бородина, Т.П. (2000). "И. Е. Репин в немецкой критике конца XIX — начала XX века" [I. Е. Repin in German criticism of the late XIX - early XX century]. Немцы в России. Русско-немецкие научные и культурные связи [Germans in Russia. Russian-German scientific and cultural relations] (in Russian). Saint Petersburg: Дмитрий Буланин. pp. 244–250. ISBN 5-8600-7248-1.
- Верёвкина, В.В. (1949). "Памяти учителя" [In memory of the teacher]. Репин [Repin]. Художественное наследство (in Russian). Vol. 2. Igor Grabar, Ilya Silberstein. Moscow: USSR Academy of Sciences Publishing House. pp. 185–199.
- Вовк, О. (2011). "Роль Верхо-Харківського Миколаївського жіночого монастиря у творчій біографії І. Ю. Рєпіна" (PDF). Актуальні Проблеми Всесвітньої Та Вітчизняної Історії (in Ukrainian) (14). National University of Kharkiv: 190–197.
- Grabar, Igor (1964). Репин [Repin] (in Russian). Vol. 2. Moscow: Nauka.
- Евстратова, Е.Н. (2008). Репин [Repin] (in Russian). Moscow: ОЛМА Медиа Групп. ISBN 978-5-37300-683-5.
- Ельшевская, Г.В. (1996). Илья Репин [Ilya Repin] (in Russian). Moscow: Слово. ISBN 5-85050-131-2.
- Кудрина, Ю.В. (2019). "Передвижники и императорская власть. К 175-летию со дня рождения И. Е. Репина" [Peredvizhniki and the Imperial Power. To the 175th anniversary of the birth of I. Е. Repin] (PDF). Иные Берега (in Russian) (1 (49)): 136–149.
- Leskov, Nikolai (1958). Собрание сочинений в 11 томах [Collected Works in 11 Volumes] (in Russian). Vol. 11: Письма (1881—1895). Moscow: Khudozhestvennaya Literatura.
- Лясковская, О.А. (1982). Илья Ефимович Репин [Ilya Efimovich Repin] (in Russian). Moscow: Iskusstvo.
- Машковцев, Н.Г. (1943). И. Е. Репин [I. E. Repin] (in Russian). Moscow - Leningrad: Iskusstvo.
- Москвинов, В.Н. (1949). "По репинским местам Харьковщины" [Along Repin's places of Kharkiv region]. In the Book «Репин» [Repin] (издание Института Истории Искусств АН СССР, Volume 2, 470 p.) (in Russian): 393–428. Archived from the original on 2016-04-09.
- Москвинов, В.Н. (1955). Репин в Москве [Repin in Moscow] (in Russian). Moscow: Государственное издательство культурно-просветительской литературы.
- Ремезов, М.Н. (М. Анютин) (1889). "Современное искусство" [Contemporary art]. Russian Mind (in Russian) (5): 188—201 (2nd pagination).
- Repin, Ilya (1946). Переписка с П. М. Третьяковым, 1873—1898 [Correspondence with P. M. Tretyakov, 1873-1898] (in Russian). М. Н. Григорьева, А. Н. Щекотова. Moscow - Leningrad: Iskusstvo.
- Repin, Ilya (1949). Переписка с В. В. Стасовым, 1877—1894 [Correspondence with V. V. Stasov, 1877-1894] (in Russian). А. К. Лебедев, Г. К. Бурова. Moscow - Leningrad: Iskusstvo.
- Repin, Ilya (1949). "Письма И. Е. Репина к В. В. Верёвкиной (1893—1929)" [I. Е. Repin's letters to V. В. Veryovkina (1893-1929)]. Репин [Repin]. Художественное наследство (in Russian). Vol. 2. Igor Grabar, Ilya Silberstein. Moscow: USSR Academy of Sciences Publishing House. pp. 200–218.
- Repin, Ilya (1969). Избранные письма в двух томах [Selected letters in two volumes] (in Russian). Vol. 1 (1867—1892). И. А. Бродский. Moscow: Iskusstvo.
- Repin, Ilya (1969). Избранные письма в двух томах [Selected letters in two volumes] (in Russian). Vol. 2 (1893—1930). И. А. Бродский. Moscow: Iskusstvo.
- Рогинская, Ф.С. (1989). Товарищество передвижных художественных выставок [Society for Travelling Art Exhibitions] (in Russian). Moscow: Iskusstvo.
- Стернин, Г.Ю. (2007). Два века. Очерки русской художественной культуры [Two Centuries. Sketches of Russian artistic culture] (in Russian). Moscow: Галарт. ISBN 978-5-269-01052-6.
- Tolstoy, Leo (1953). Полное собрание сочинений [Complete Works] (in Russian). Vol. 64: Письма (1887—1889). Moscow: Khudozhestvennaya Literatura. pp. 248–249.
- Юденкова, Т.В. (2019). "Илья Репин: «Выражаться свободно». О некоторых особенностях творческого метода И. Е. Репина" [Ilya Repin: "Free expression". On some features of the creative method of I. Е. Repin] (PDF). Искусствознание (in Russian) (4): 120–153.
- Яковлева, Н.А. (2005). Историческая картина в русской живописи [Historical painting in Russian painting]. Энциклопедия мирового искусства (in Russian). Moscow: Bely Gorod. ISBN 5-7793-0898-5.
- Yasinsky, Ieronim (1926). Роман моей жизни. Книга воспоминаний [The novel of my life. A book of memories] (in Russian). Moscow - Leningrad: Государственное издательство.
- Государственный Русский музей — Живопись, XVIII — начало XX века (каталог) [State Russian Museum - Painting, 18th - early 20th century (catalogue)] (in Russian). Leningrad: Aurora, Iskusstvo. 1980.
- Государственный Русский музей — каталог собрания [State Russian Museum - catalogue of the collection] (in Russian). Vol. 7: Живопись второй половины XIX века (Н—Я). В. А. Леняшин. Saint Petersburg: Palace Editions. 2017. ISBN 978-3-906917-17-7.
- Государственный Русский музей — Из истории музея [The State Russian Museum - From the history of the museum] (in Russian). И. Н. Карасик, Е. Н. Петрова. Saint Petersburg: State Russian Museum. 1995. ISBN 5-900872-04-1.
- И. Е. Репин. Каталог выставки с 58 иллюстрациями [I. Е. Repin. Exhibition catalogue with 58 illustrations] (in Russian). М. П. Кристи. Moscow: Государственное издательство изобразительного искусства. 1936. p. 40.
- Иллюстрированный каталог XVII передвижной выставки «Товарищества передвижных художественных выставок» [Illustrated catalogue of the XVII travelling exhibition of the Society for Travelling Art Exhibitions] (in Russian). Н. П. Собко. Saint Petersburg: Типография М. М. Стасюлевича. 1889.
- Новое о Репине. Статьи и письма художника, воспоминания учеников и друзей, публикации [New about Repin. Articles and letters of the artist, memories of his students and friends, publications.] (in Russian). И. А. Бродский, В. Н. Москвинов. Leningrad: Художник РСФСР. 1969. p. 168.
- Святитель Николай Чудотворец [Saint Nicholas the Wonderworker] (in Russian). Андрей Вознесенский, Фёдор Гусев. Moscow: Издание Сретенского монастыря. 2005.
- Товарищество передвижных художественных выставок. Письма, документы. 1869—1899 [Society for Travelling Art Exhibitions. Letters, documents. 1869-1899] (in Russian). В. В. Андреева, М. В. Астафьева, С. Н. Гольдштейн, Н. Л. Приймак. Moscow: Iskusstvo. 1987.
- Художники и коллекционеры — Русскому музею. Дары (1898—2019) [Artists and collectors to the Russian Museum. Gifts (1898-2019)] (in Russian). Moscow: State Russian Museum. 2019.
