= Hlyboke =

Hlyboke (Ukrainian: Глибо́ке) is the name of several villages in Ukraine:

- Hlyboke, Nizhyn Raion, Chernihiv Oblast
- Hlyboke, Pryluky Raion, Chernihiv Oblast
- Hlyboke, Donetsk Oblast
- Hlyboke, Ivano-Frankivsk Oblast
- Hlyboke, Kharkiv Oblast
- Hlyboke, Kirovohrad Oblast
- Hlyboke, Kyiv Oblast
- Hlyboke — a former village in the former Bilokurakyne Raion of Luhansk Oblast
- Hlyboke, Luhansk Raion, Luhansk Oblast
- Hlyboke, Mykolaiv Oblast
- Hlyboke, Odesa Oblast
- Hlyboke, Kremenchuk Raion, Poltava Oblast
- Hlyboke, Liutenka rural hromada, Myrhorod Raion, Poltava Oblast
- Hlyboke, Myrhorod urban hromada, Myrhorod Raion, Poltava Oblast
- Hlyboke, Zakarpattia Oblast

== See also ==
- Hlyboke village council
