= Ternova =

Ternova Тернова
- Village
- Location in Ukraine Ternova (Kharkiv Oblast)
- Coordinates: 50°11′27″N 36°40′40″E
- Country: Ukraine
- Oblast: Kharkiv Oblast
- Raion: Kharkiv Raion
- Hromada: Lyptsi rural hromada

Population (2023)
  - Total: 0
- Postal code: 62421

Ternova is a village in Kharkiv Raion, Ukraine, 5 kilometres (3.1 miles) away from the Russian border.

== History ==
Ternova has a history that dates back to the 16th century, when it was a remote frontier settlement of the Tsardom of Russia. According to records from 1864, the town was a state settlement with a population of 1,607 people, including 887 males and 892 females. There were 281 farmsteads and both an Eastern Orthodox church and a post office in the area.

By 1914, the population of Ternova had increased to 4,149 people.

=== Russo-Ukrainian War ===
During the eastern campaign of the 2022 Russian invasion of Ukraine, fighting between Russian and Ukrainian forces had started in Ternova in late May 2022.

On September 12, 2022, the Ukrainian Ground Forces successfully liberated the village of Ternova in the north of Kharkiv Oblast during its 2022 Kharkiv counteroffensive and reached the border with Russia. This was announced by the head of the Office of the President of Ukraine, Andriy Yermak, in a Telegram post. According to the report, the 14th Separate Mechanized Brigade in the Kharkiv region entered the village, marking a significant moment in the ongoing conflict in eastern Ukraine.

On 13 May 2024, during the Russian 2024 Kharkiv offensive, Russian sources claimed that Ukrainian forces partially withdrew from Ternova following clashes nearby however the status of the village is currently unknown.

== Geography ==
Ternova is located between two rivers, the Murom and the Siverskyi Donets, and is surrounded by several forest areas, including the Zalomny (oak) forest. The village is also close to the Russian border, located just 2 km away.

== Notable residents ==
- Oleksa Vetuchiv (c. 1867 – c. 1869 —1941), Ukrainian philologist
