= Peremoha, Kharkiv Raion =

Village in Kharkiv Oblast, Ukraine

Peremoha Перемога
- Village
- Location of Peremoha Peremoha (Ukraine)
- Coordinates: 50°07′02″N 36°40′00″E
- Country: Ukraine
- Oblast: Kharkiv Oblast
- Raion: Kharkiv Raion
- Hromada: Vilkhivka rural hromada
- Elevation: 153 m (502 ft)

Population (2001)
  - Total: 850
- Time zone: UTC+2
  - Summer (DST): UTC+3
- Postal code: 62422
- Area code: +380 57

Peremoha (Ukrainian: Перемога) is a village in the Kharkiv Raion, Kharkiv Oblast (province) of eastern Ukraine. It is part of the Lyptsi rural hromada, one of the hromadas of Ukraine.
