= 127th Heavy Mechanized Brigade =

Ukrainian 127th Territorial Defense Forces Brigade

127th Heavy Mechanized Brigade (2025–present) 127th Territorial Defense Brigade (2022–2025)
- Ukrainian: 127-ма окрема бригада територіальної оборони
- Active: 8 March 2022 - present
- Country: Ukraine
- Branch: Armed Forces of Ukraine
- Role: Mechanized Infantry
- Part of: Operational Command East; 11th Army Corps
- Garrison/HQ: Kharkiv; MUN А7383
- Patron: Kharkiv
- Engagements: Russo-Ukrainian War; 2022 Kharkiv counteroffensive; Kursk offensive (2024–2025)
- Website: 127ovmbr.mil.gov.ua

Commanders
- Current commander: Krupko Yuri Yuriyovych

Insignia
- TrO Flag

The 127th Separate Heavy Mechanized Brigade Kharkiv (Ukrainian: 127-ма окрема бригада територіальної оборони) is a military formation of the Ukrainian Ground Forces in Kharkiv. It is part of Operational Command East.

== History ==
=== Formation ===
Brigade artillery in action

In early March 2022 Colonel Roman Hryshchenko began forming the brigade in Kharkiv. In the first stage almost two thousand servicemen joined the unit. They were assigned to headquarters and two battalions.

=== Russo-Ukrainian War ===
==== Russian invasion of Ukraine ====
The first assignment of the brigade was to reinforce army and national guard units defending the city. As of July 2022, the brigade was holding the front line north and east of the city of Kharkiv. On 29 August 2022 the brigade received its battle flag. On 11 September 2022, the brigade's 249th Battalion announced that the village of Borshchova had come under Ukrainian control. Two days later, on 13 September, the brigade's 247th Battalion announced that it had captured the villages of Lyptsi, Hlyboke, and Strilecha, amid a Ukrainian counteroffensive in Kharkiv Oblast.

In July 2023 the 225th battalion transferred out of the brigade and became a separate assault battalion of the Ground Forces.

In 2024, the brigade was transferred to the Ground Forces of Ukraine, and in July 2025, the unit was reformed as heavy mechanized brigade.

On 6 December 2025 President Volodymyr Zelenskyy awarded the brigade the honorary name "Kharkivska".

== Structure ==
As of 2022 the brigade's structure is as follows:

- Headquarters
- 225th Territorial Defense Battalion MUN А7400
- 226th Territorial Defense Battalion MUN А7401
- 227th Territorial Defense Battalion MUN А7402
- 228th Territorial Defense Battalion MUN А7403
- 229th Territorial Defense Battalion MUN А7404
- 247th Territorial Defense Battalion MUN А4085
- 249th Territorial Defense Battalion
- Engineering Company
- Communication Company
- Logistics Company
- Mortar Battery

== Commanders ==
- Colonel Roman Hryshchenko (2022–2023)
- Colonel Yurii Krupko (2023–present)

== See also ==
- Territorial Defense Forces of the Armed Forces of Ukraine
