= Borysivka, Kharkiv Oblast =

Village in Kharkiv Oblast, Ukraine

Coordinates: 50°16′31″N 36°33′43″E

Borysivka (Ukrainian: Борисівка) is a selo (village) in Lyptsi rural hromada, Kharkiv Raion, Kharkiv Oblast, Ukraine. The village was formerly administrated by the Lukiantsi rural hromada before the 2020 administrative division reforms.

Borysivka was called Sontsivka (Ukrainian: Сонцівка) before 1897 and the population in 2001 was 533 people.

== Geography ==
Borysivka is located 3 km from the left bank of the Lypets. The village is right on the border with Russia, oppositely bordering the Russian village of Solntsevka in Belgorod Oblast. A dried-up stream flows through Borysivka and a large garden massif is adjacent to the village.

== History ==
Borysivka was first mentioned in 1779 as Sontsivka (or Sontsevka in Russian) as a settlement within the Russian Empire.

During the initial eastern campaign of the 2022 Russian invasion of Ukraine, the village was occupied by Russia on 24 February 2022, the first day of the conflict. It was retaken by Ukrainian forces later that year during its 2022 Kharkiv counteroffensive. Borysivka was once again captured by Russian forces on 10 May 2024 during the 2024 Kharkiv offensive.

== Transport ==
The bus route 1177 runs daily on the route from Heroiv Pratsi station in Kharkiv to Borysivka.

== Monuments ==
In November 1998, a monument to Dmytro Yavornytsky was erected on Sadovii Street. The creators of the monument are Natalia and Oleksii Fomenka.

== Notable residents ==
- Dmytro Yavornytsky (1855 – 1940), Ukrainian academician, historian, archeologist, ethnographer, folklorist, and lexicographer.
- Ivan Berezhnyi (1922 – 1997), Ukrainian food commodity expert, candidate of technical sciences and professor.
