= Krasne, Kharkiv Raion =

Village in Kharkiv Oblast, Ukraine

Krasne Красне
- Village
- Interactive map of Krasne
- Location of Krasne within Ukraine Krasne (Ukraine)
- Coordinates: 50.281944°N 36.459722°E
- Country: Ukraine
- Oblast: Kharkiv Oblast
- Raion: Kharkiv Raion
- Hromada: Lyptsi rural hromada
- Founded: 1783

Area
  - Total: 0.2 km^{2} (0.077 sq mi)
- Elevation: 175 m (574 ft)

Population (2001 census)
  - Total: 19
  - Density: 95/km^{2} (250/sq mi)
- Time zone: UTC+2 (EET)
  - Summer (DST): UTC+3 (EEST)
- Postal code: 62410
- Area code: +380 57

Krasne (Ukrainian: Красне; Russian: Красное) is a village in Kharkiv Raion (district) in Kharkiv Oblast of eastern Ukraine, 32.73 kilometres (20.34 mi) north-northeast (NNE) of the centre of Kharkiv city. It belongs to Lyptsi rural hromada, one of the hromadas of Ukraine.

== History ==
Krasne was founded in 1783 as a frontier settlement of the expanding Russian Empire.

During the initial eastern campaign of the 2022 Russian invasion of Ukraine, the village was occupied by Russia on 24 February 2022, the first day of the conflict. It was retaken by Ukrainian forces later that year during its 2022 Kharkiv counteroffensive. Krasne was once again captured by Russian forces on 10 May 2024 during the 2024 Kharkiv offensive.

== Demographics ==
As of the 2001 Ukrainian census, the settlement had 19 inhabitants, whose native languages were 55.00% Ukrainian and 45.00% Russian.
