= Oliinykove =

Village in Kharkiv Oblast, Ukraine

Oliinykove Олійникове
- Village
- Interactive map of Oliinykove
- Location of Oliinykove within Ukraine Oliinykove (Ukraine)
- Coordinates: 50.2678°N 36.4844°E
- Country: Ukraine
- Oblast: Kharkiv Oblast
- Raion: Kharkiv Raion
- Hromada: Lyptsi rural hromada
- Founded: 1800

Area
  - Total: 0.02 km^{2} (0.0077 sq mi)
- Elevation: 166 m (545 ft)

Population (2001 census)
  - Total: 8
  - Density: 400/km^{2} (1,000/sq mi)
- Time zone: UTC+2 (EET)
  - Summer (DST): UTC+3 (EEST)
- Postal code: 62413
- Area code: +380 557

Oliinykove (Ukrainian: Олійникове; Russian: Олейниково) is a village in Kharkiv Raion (district) in Kharkiv Oblast of eastern Ukraine, located 31.69 kilometres (19.69 mi) north-northeast of Kharkiv city.

== History ==
Oliinykove was founded in 1800 as a settlement within the Russian Empire.

During the initial eastern campaign of the 2022 Russian invasion of Ukraine, the village was occupied by Russia on 24 February 2022, the first day of the conflict. It was subsequently retaken by Ukrainian forces later that year during its 2022 Kharkiv counteroffensive. Oliinykove was once again captured by Russian forces on 11 May 2024 during the 2024 Kharkiv offensive.

== Demographics ==
As of the 2001 Ukrainian census, the settlement had 8 inhabitants, whose native language was 100% Ukrainian.
