= Morokhovets =

Settlement in Kharkiv Oblast, Ukraine

Morokhovets Мороховець
- Village
- Interactive map of Morokhovets
- Location of Morokhovets within Ukraine Morokhovets (Ukraine)
- Coordinates: 50.273056°N 36.471111°E
- Country: Ukraine
- Oblast Region: Kharkiv Oblast
- Raion: Kharkiv Raion
- Hromada: Lyptsi rural hromada
- Founded: 1730

Area
  - Total: 0.3 km^{2} (0.12 sq mi)
- Elevation: 165 m (541 ft)

Population (2001 census)
  - Total: 29
  - Density: 97/km^{2} (250/sq mi)
- Time zone: UTC+2 (EET)
  - Summer (DST): UTC+3 (EEST)
- Postal code: 62410
- Area code: +380 57

Morokhovets (Ukrainian: Мороховець; Russian: Мороховец) is a village in Kharkiv Raion (district) in Kharkiv Oblast of eastern Ukraine, 31.97 kilometres (19.87 mi) north-northeast (NNE) of the centre of Kharkiv city. It belongs to Lyptsi rural hromada, one of the hromadas of Ukraine.

== History ==
Morokhovets was founded in 1730 as a frontier settlement of the expanding Russian Empire.

During the initial eastern campaign of the 2022 Russian invasion of Ukraine, the village was occupied by Russia on 24 February 2022, the first day of the conflict. It was subsequently retaken by Ukrainian forces later that year during its 2022 Kharkiv counteroffensive. Morokhovets was once again captured by Russian forces on 11 May 2024 during the 2024 Kharkiv offensive.

== Demographics ==
As of the 2001 Ukrainian census, the settlement had 29 inhabitants. Their native languages were 47.73% Ukrainian and 52.27% Russian.
