= Zelene, Kharkiv Raion =

Village in Kharkiv Oblast, Ukraine

Zelene Зелене
- Village
- Interactive map of Zelene
- Location of Zelene within Ukraine Zelene (Ukraine)
- Coordinates: 50.226111°N 36.581944°E
- Country: Ukraine
- Oblast: Kharkiv Oblast
- Raion: Kharkiv Raion
- Hromada: Lyptsi rural hromada
- Founded: 1725

Area
  - Total: 0.34 km^{2} (0.13 sq mi)
- Elevation: 133 m (436 ft)

Population (2001 census)
  - Total: 71
  - Density: 210/km^{2} (540/sq mi)
- Time zone: UTC+2 (EET)
  - Summer (DST): UTC+3 (EEST)
- Postal code: 62420
- Area code: +380 57

Zelene (Ukrainian: Зелене; Russian: Зелёное) is a village in Kharkiv Raion (district) in Kharkiv Oblast of eastern Ukraine, located 31.60 kilometres (19.64 mi) northeast of Kharkiv city. It belongs to Lyptsi rural hromada, one of the hromadas of Ukraine.

== History ==
Zelene was founded in 1725 as a frontier settlement of the expanding Russian Empire.

=== Russo-Ukrainian War ===
During the initial eastern campaign of the 2022 Russian invasion of Ukraine, the village was occupied by Russia on or shortly after the first day of the conflict. It was subsequently retaken by Ukrainian forces later that year during its 2022 Kharkiv counteroffensive.

Zelene was once again captured by Russian forces on 13 May 2024 during the 2024 Kharkiv offensive.

On May 14, DeepState confirmed the village to be under Ukrainian control. On 15 September, Ukrainian forces retreated to the outside of the village to establish better defensive positions.

The Russian defense ministry claimed on 1 February 2026 that Russian forces took the towns of Zelene and Sukhetske, northeast of Rodynske.

== Demographics ==
As of the 2001 Ukrainian census, the settlement had 71 inhabitants, whose native languages were 50.68% Ukrainian and 49.32% Russian.
