= Lyptsi rural hromada =

Hromada in Kharkiv Raion, Kharkiv Oblast, Ukraine

Lyptsi rural territorial hromada (Ukrainian: Липецька сільська територіальна громада, romanized: Lypetska silska terytorialna hromada) is a hromada located in Kharkiv Raion, Kharkiv Oblast, Ukraine. The administrative center is Lyptsi.

The total area and population of the hromada are 362.5 square kilometres (140.0 sq mi) and 13,321 respectively.

The rural hromada was formed on 12 June 2020 by merging the Lyptsi, Vesele, Hlyboke, Slobozhanske, Lukiantsi, and Ternova village councils (silski rady; Ukrainian: сільські ради) of Kharkiv Raion, Kharkiv Oblast. The first elections were held on 25 October 2020.

== Composition ==
The hromada comprises seventeen settlements; one rural settlement, Male Vesele, and sixteen villages:

- Borshchova
- Borysivka
- Hlyboke
- Krasne
- Lukiantsi
- Lyptsi
- Morokhovets
- Neskuchne
- Oliinykove
- Peremoha
- Pylna
- Slobozhanske
- Strilecha
- Ternova
- Vesele
- Zelene

== Geography ==
Lyptsi rural hromada is located in the north of Kharkiv Oblast. The hromada occupies a border position with Russia.

Lyptsi rural hromada is located on the slopes of the Central Russian Upland, in the forest-steppe natural zone, in the basin of the Siversky Donets (the Don basin). The rivers flowing through the hromada are flat, have old beds, and artificial lakes have been built on some of them.

The climate of the hromada is temperate continental with cold winters and hot summers. The average annual temperature is +8.7 °C, ranging from −4.5 °C in January to +22 °C in July. The average annual rainfall is 520 mm. The heaviest rainfall occurs in the summer.

The soils of the hromada are chernozems and meadow soils.

== Notable people ==
Notable people born in the settlements of the hromada include:

- Dmytro Ivanovych Yavornytsky (1855–1940; born in Borysivka, then called Sontsivka), Ukrainian academician, historian, archeologist, ethnographer, folklorist, and lexicographer
- Mykhailo Hordiiovych Derehus (1904–1997; born in Vesele), Soviet Ukrainian graphic artist, painter, and teacher

== See also ==
- List of hromadas of Ukraine
