= Hlyboke, Kharkiv Oblast =

Hlyboke Глибоке
- Village
- Interactive map of Hlyboke
- Location of Hlyboke within Ukraine Hlyboke (Kharkiv Oblast)
- Coordinates: 50°15′27″N 36°25′31″E
- Country: Ukraine
- Oblast: Kharkiv Oblast
- Raion: Kharkiv Raion
- Hromada: Lyptsi rural hromada
- Founded: 1930

Area
  - Total: 0.47 km^{2} (0.18 sq mi)
- Elevation: 150 m (490 ft)

Population (2001 census)
  - Total: 1,156; Civilian population has been evacuated during the Russian invasion
  - Density: 2,500/km^{2} (6,400/sq mi)
- Time zone: UTC+2 (EET)
  - Summer (DST): UTC+3 (EEST)
- Postal code: 62410
- Area code: +380 57
- KATOTTH: UA63120090160050552

Hlyboke (Ukrainian: Глибоке; Russian: Глубокое) is a village in Lyptsi rural hromada, Kharkiv Raion, Kharkiv Oblast, Ukraine. It is located 29.68 kilometres (18.44 mi) south-southwest (SSW) from the centre of Kharkiv city, at about 5.2 kilometres (3.2 mi) east-southeast (ESE) of the Russia–Ukraine border.

== History ==
The settlement was founded in 1930.

=== Russian invasion of Ukraine ===
On 13 September 2022, the 247th Battalion of Ukraine's 127th Territorial Defense Brigade announced that its forces had recaptured Hlyboke, raising the Ukrainian flag in the village.

The village witnessed intense fighting in the summer of 2024, during the 2024 Kharkiv offensive of the full-scale Russian invasion of Ukraine.

== Demographics ==
As of the 2001 Ukrainian census, the settlement had 1,156 inhabitants, whose native languages were Ukrainian (58.69%), Russian (40.23%) and other languages (0.58%).
