= 2024 northern Kharkiv offensive =

Battle in the Russian invasion of Ukraine

- Part of the Kharkiv Oblast campaign (2024–present) of the Russo-Ukrainian war (2022–present)
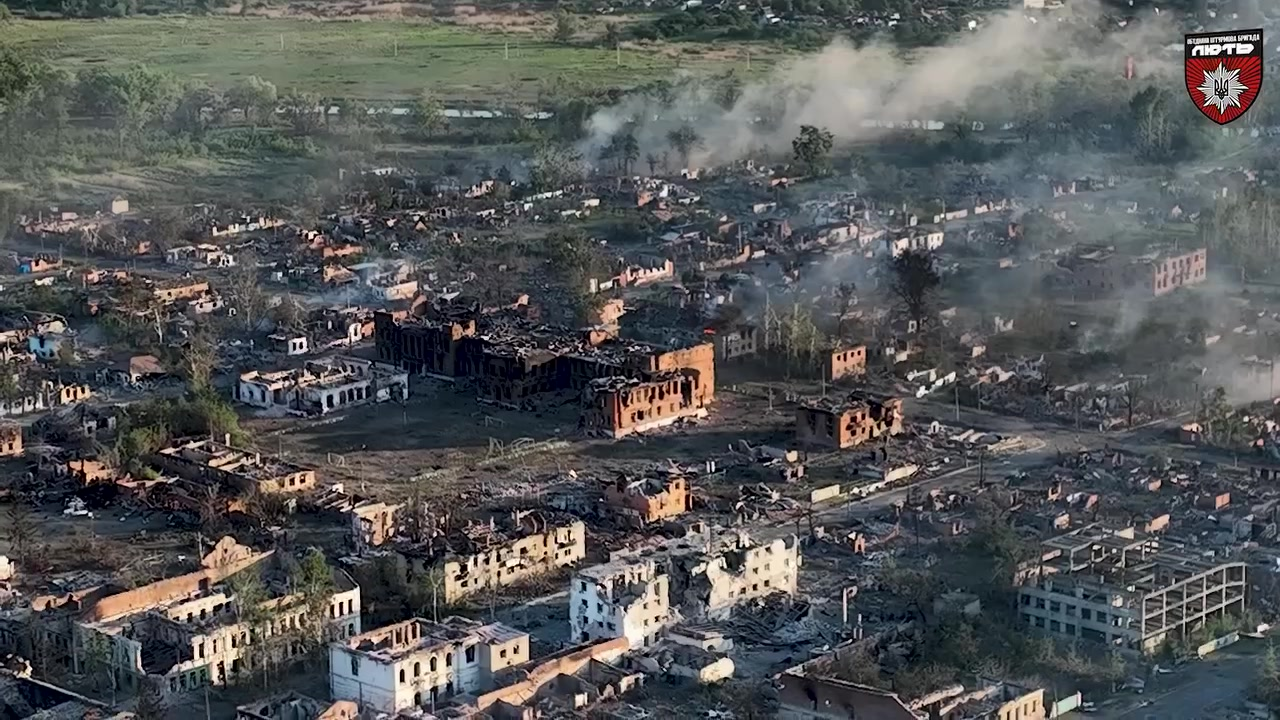
- Ruins of Vovchansk after Russian bombing in June 2024
Date	10 May 2024 – June 2024
Location	Kharkiv Oblast
Result	Inconclusive
Territorial changes	Russian army captures several border villages, but fails to advance further.

Belligerents
Russia	Ukraine

Units involved
Order of battle	Order of battle

Strength
2,000 – 8,000 (initial force per Ukraine); 72,000–75,000 (Northern Group of Forces total strength by August 7 per ISW); 46,000–47,000 (Belgorod Group of Forces total strength by September 29 per ISW)	Unknown

Casualties and losses
- 10,500 civilians evacuated

On 10 May 2024, the Russian Armed Forces began an offensive operation in Ukraine's Kharkiv Oblast, shelling and attempting to breach the defenses of the Ukrainian Armed Forces in the direction of Vovchansk and Kharkiv. The Guardian reported that the offensive led to Russia's biggest territorial gains in 18 months. By early June the Russian offensive stalled, with The Guardian reporting that the situation on the frontline had been "stabilized." Ukrainian forces then began small-scale counterattacks, which reportedly recaptured a settlement on 19 June.

The Russian armed forces have also launched raids into Sumy Oblast and other segments of Kharkiv Oblast, in an effort to draw Ukrainian resources away from the main offensive in Kharkiv. Similarly, Ukrainian forces have launched raids into Belgorod Oblast, while some western analysts attribute the 2024 Kursk offensive as a diversion from Kharkiv.

== Background ==
Ukrainian forces dismantling Russian pro-annexation propaganda posters in Vovchansk during the city's liberation in the 2022 Kharkiv counteroffensive

The flag of the Russian administration of occupied Kharkiv Oblast

On February 24, 2022, the opening day of the Russian invasion of Ukraine, 20,000 Russian soldiers commenced an offensive operation south from Belgorod Oblast to capture Kharkiv, Ukraine's second largest city. Throughout February, Russian forces captured Vovchansk, before continuing south to Shevchenkove, and Balakliia, Izium. It has been speculated that Russian operations near these cities were initially meant to cut off Kharkiv from the south and southeast, thus separating it from combat-ready Ukrainian units in the Donbas and ensuring its capture by the Russian forces advancing from the city's north, though Russian forces would later abandon their plans to capture Kharkiv. For three days Kharkiv was the site of street fighting until Russian forces withdrew on February 28 under threat of being encircled in the city. Ukrainian forces launched a major counteroffensive in Kharkiv Oblast in late 2022. As a result, Ukrainian control was restored over most of Kharkiv Oblast, with the exception of a small portion in the northeast between the border with Luhansk Oblast and the Oskil river.

Ethnically Russian pro-Ukrainian militias, the Russian Volunteer Corps and Freedom of Russia Legion performed cross-border raids into Kursk and Belgorod in 2023 and again later in 2024. Kremlin Press Secretary Dmitry Peskov and Russian Foreign Minister Sergey Lavrov repeatedly threatened to attack Kharkiv Oblast and establish a buffer zone to protect Russia's border in response. During the first months of 2024, reports appeared that the Russian army was rebuilding its forces in the north to launch a new offensive in the direction of Kharkiv later that year. On 8 May 2024, the governor of Kharkiv Oblast, Oleh Syniehubov, reported a large gathering of Russian forces north of the region. The secretary of the National Security and Defense Council of Ukraine, Oleksandr Lytvynenko, subsequently said that over 50,000 Russian soldiers had been deployed to the border.

According to the Ukrainian military journalist Yurii Butusov, the Ukrainian command became aware of the Russian plan to launch an offensive into the Kharkiv region and the composition of the troops involved no later than the beginning of April. At the end of April, the Ukrainian forces in the area were brought to full combat readiness.

== Offensive ==
Map of Russian advances up to 16 May 2024

Up to 4–5 Russian infantry battalions from a newly created force launched an armored ground attack across the state border around 05:00 on 10 May, opening a new front in the war. Russian forces launched two limited offensive efforts, one in the direction of Lyptsi and one in the area of Vovchansk. Ukraine's armed forces urged residents of northern Kharkiv Oblast to evacuate.

A senior Ukrainian military source told Reuters that Russian forces were aiming to advance up to 10 kilometers into Ukrainian territory in order to establish a buffer zone. Ukrainian officials did not believe that Russia was capable of launching an operation to capture Kharkiv, Ukraine's second-largest city.

=== Vovchansk front ===
On 10 May, the border city of Vovchansk was subjected to "massive shelling" by artillery and guided aerial bombs, and residents were evacuated. Fighting was reported in the villages of Pletenivka, Hatyshche, and Ohirtseve, and Russian bloggers claimed that these three villages had come under Russian control.

In a 11 May briefing, the Russian defence ministry claimed that its forces had taken Pletenivka and Ohirtseve. According to the ISW, geolocated footage published on 11 May indicated Ohirtseve had indeed come under Russian control.

The same day, Russian military bloggers claimed that Russian forces had captured the village of Tykhe and were trying to advance into Vovchansk, but the ISW said it had not observed evidence to verify these claims.

The Russian Ministry of Defence claimed on 12 May that its forces had captured the village of Hatyshche. ISW assessed that Hatyshche, Pletenivka and Tykhe had come under Russian control by 12 May. Certain Russian and Ukrainian sources claimed that combat was ongoing in Vovchansk, though a Ukrainian military spokesman denied reports that Russian forces had entered the city.

On 13 May, Russian forces advanced into Vovchansk and managed to capture the Vovchansk meat processing plant located north of the city. A shoe factory in the north of Vovchansk was captured in the morning and Russian troops advanced into the center of Vovchansk up to the northern (right) bank of the river Vovcha by the evening, according to Russian milbloggers. The General Staff of the Ukrainian Armed Forces said that Russian forces had achieved "tactical success" in Vovchansk.

On 14 May, Russian forces continued to make gains within Vovchansk, and advanced into central Buhruvatka. The Russian ministry of defense claimed that its forces had fully secured the village, which the ISW said was consistent with geolocated evidence.

Russian advances near Vovchansk continued on 15 May. Russian milbloggers claimed that Russian forces had taken control of Starytsia and were attacking near Izbytske and Buhruvatka. The next day, Russian forces advanced within northern Vovchansk and made marginal gains in northeastern Starytsia, while continuing offensive operations near Starytsia and Pletenivka. A Ukrainian sergeant operating near Vovchansk told the Wall Street Journal on 17 May that Russian forces were in control the northern half of the city, although the ISW had not observed evidence that the entire portion of Vovchansk north of the Vovcha River had come under Russian control.

The Russian ministry of defense claimed on 18 May that the Russian army had captured Zybyne, and also claimed to have advanced near Buhruvatka and repelled Ukrainian counterattacks near Tykhe.

Russian forces made advances in Vovchansk on 19 May, namely in the northeast, reportedly reaching the Vovcha River. Russian milbloggers claimed on 19 May that Russian forces seized Starytsia and Buhruvatka. The Russian Ministry of Defense claimed that Russian forces repelled Ukrainian counterattacks in Vovchansk and near Starytsia on 21 May.

Russian milbloggers claimed the same day that a Russian force had crossed the Vovcha River. The Institute for the Study of War assessed that Russia probably maintained a small infantry foothold across the river, but with no vehicles or artillery.

=== Lyptsi front ===
On 10 May, Russian forces reportedly captured the villages of Krasne, Borysivka, Strilecha, and Pylna. According to Ukrainian military journalist Yuri Butusov, this captured border area had been a "gray zone" behind the Ukrainian defensive line with no Ukrainian military presence, with the exception of Strilecha. Syniehubov also referred to the affected villages as a "gray zone", claiming that "the Ukrainian armed forces have not lost a single meter". According to DeepStateMap.Live analysts, citing confidential sources, Russian forces had occupied the village of Pylna several days before 10 May, but poor communication within the Ukrainian military had prevented any action from being taken.

The same day, fighting was reported in the villages of Hoptivka, Morokhovets, and Oliinykove. Russian bloggers claimed that Zelene had come under Russian control. Ukraine's 42nd Mechanized Brigade published footage on 10 May of its "Perun" unit destroying four Russian BMP infantry fighting vehicles in the area of Pylna using combat drones, claiming to have inflicted several casualties.

The Russian defence ministry claimed in an 11 May briefing that its forces had taken the villages of Strilecha, Pylna and Borysivka. According to the ISW, geolocated footage published on 11 May indicated that Morokhovets and Oliinykove had also come under Russian control. Furthermore, it was claimed by Russian military bloggers that Russian forces had captured the villages of Hoptivka and Kudiivka on 11 May, though ISW said it had not observed evidence to verify these claims. The Russian Ministry of Defence announced the capture of Krasne, Morokhovets and Oliinykove on 12 May.

Ukrainian outlets Rubryka and Ukrainska Pravda reported that the DeepState map indicated on 13 May that Russian forces had taken control over the village of Zelene, while the village of Lukiantsi was almost wholly occupied. The next day, DeepState reported that Zelene was still under Ukrainian control despite heavy fighting in the area.

A Ukrainian source claimed that Lukiantsi had been captured by 13 May. Russian sources claimed that the entirety of Lukiantsi had been captured on 14 May. The same day, the Ukrainian General Staff reported that Ukrainian forces "repositioned" near Lukiantsi to save the lives of Ukrainian personnel. This was considered a "tacit acknowledgment of Russian advances into the settlement" by the Institute for the Study of War, though it was unable to independently confirm the Russian capture of Lukiantsi until 16 May. Lyptsi village head Serhiy Kryvetchenko announced on 15 May that Russian forces had entered Lukiantsi.

Russian sources claimed on 15 May that Russian forces had captured Hlyboke and Lukiantsi. The Russian Ministry of Defense also claimed that its forces had captured these villages. Russian forces made advances east of Hlyboke and along the east bank of the Travianske Reservoir on 15 May.

The Ukrainian General Staff reported on 15 May that Ukrainian forces repelled Russian assaults between Borysivka and Neskuchne.

== Stalemate ==
After the initial Russian offensive in May, the front line saw minimal changes the rest of the year.

Ukrainian Commander-in-Chief Oleksandr Syrskyi reported on 23 May that Russian forces had switched to an "active defense" in the Lyptsi direction, and were no longer performing offensive actions there. Syrskyi also stated that Russian forces were now "bogged down" in street fighting in Vovchansk, which was reflected by Russian milbloggers claims that fighting there had become "positional."

The next day, the Ukrainian general staff said their forces "halted" the Russian advance and "stabilized" the situation along the border. Russian milbloggers reflected this sentiment, calling the front-line "stagnate" and reporting on a failed effort by Russian forces to cross the Vovcha River.

On 29 May, Kostiantyn Mashovets, a Ukrainian military observer, reported that the Russian 18th Motor Rifle Division had switched to an "active defense" while Russian sources claimed that the 25th and 138th motorized rifle brigades, 2nd Motorized Rifle Division, and 47th Tank Division had begun to "conslidate" their positions and engage in defensive efforts.

By 1 June, Russian milbloggers described the offensive as having "stalled" because Russian forces failed to control the battlefield with artillery and air support, attributing Ukraine's defense primarily to the use of drones. The offensive has been described as a Russian strategic failure.

== Analysis ==
The offensive comes at a time when the limited Ukrainian troops were already stretched across a 1,000+ km frontline, forcing partial troop pull backs from other areas such as Kupiansk. Observers assessed that Ukraine appeared to be ill-prepared for the offensive despite official denials. Noting a small buildup of Russian forces near Sumy Oblast, Kyiv warned that the current operation may be a precursor to a larger summer offensive.

In a Reuters article, Pasi Paroinen, an analyst with the Black Bird Group, also assessed that the Kharkiv push aimed to deplete limited Ukrainian reserves before a main offensive. Notably, he said: "If Ukraine overcommits in Kharkiv and Sumy, they may preserve some territory there, perhaps prevent Kharkiv civilians from suffering artillery bombardments, perhaps even push back the enemy back to the border, but it may cost them the war, if the reserves are not available to respond to crises during the Russian summer offensive." In a lighter tone, David Axe, a military correspondent for Forbes, suggested that the offensive might be "an elaborate feint" whose main goal was to pull Ukrainian resources away from Chasiv Yar and the area of Avdiivka.

On 28 May, the Institute for the Study of War reported attacks east of Chasiv Yar and Novopokrovske, as well as attacks near Novomykhailivka and Staromaiorske, all of which are in Donetsk Oblast. All four attacks were considered by the ISW to have likely been intended to test Ukrainian response after the Kharkiv offensive; they failed to make any meaningful gain.

The decision by US president Joe Biden in late May to allow firing US-supplied weapons into Russian territory to defend Kharkiv was seen by observers as having allowed Ukraine to very quickly stem the Russian offensive, and gain time to bring in troops from the southern and eastern fronts.

By July 6, Russian milbloggers began to critically denounce the offensive's leadership, claiming that Russian forces are far from achieving their objective of creating a 15-kilometer buffer zone and that Russian forces are struggling with coordination in the Vovchansk direction. These milbloggers also pointed out that Russian forces have already suffered a third of the casualties that Russian forces suffered in their four-month campaign to seize Avdiivka. Milbloggers conclude that this is the result of the poor leadership and tactical skills of Colonel General Alexander Lapin, commander of the Russian Northern Grouping of Forces.

== Reactions ==
On 25 May 2024, the Ukrainian State Bureau of Investigation opened an investigation into the Ukrainian army's 125th Brigade and its subordinate units for failing to "properly organize the defense of positions on the border of Kharkiv Oblast" due to a "careless attitude to military service".

On 30 May 2024, US president Biden gave Ukraine permission to strike targets inside Russia near Kharkiv Oblast using American-supplied weapons. The same permission was given to Ukraine by Germany, France and the United Kingdom.

On 8 June 2024, Ukrainian president Zelenskyy said in his evening address that Russia had failed its Kharkiv offensive despite on-going fighting in the area.

On 9 June 2024, US national security adviser Jake Sullivan said that Russia's advance in the area had "stalled out".

== Military casualty claims ==
=== Russia ===
The Ukrainian's Khortytsia group claimed on 10 June that Russia lost 4,000 soldiers killed and injured over the past month. They also claimed to have damaged or destroyed 52 Russian tanks, 59 armored vehicles, 165 artillery systems, six units of air defense equipment. However, an undisclosed NATO official estimated that "Russia likely suffered losses of almost 1,000 people a day in May," referring to the number of fatalities (allegedly "calculated" at over 30,000), potentially indicating even higher numbers than those presented by the Khortytsia group.

On 10 July, Ukraine's Kharkiv OTP group made an estimate claiming that out of 10,350 Russian troops deployed, 2,939 soldiers had been killed and 6,509 had been wounded in action, losses of approximately 91%. Additionally, 45 Russian troops have been captured as of early July. Russia's 83rd Air Assault Brigade was claimed to be "constantly suffering losses" of "several dozen people a day". On 21 July, President Zelenskyy gave a much higher claim of Russians killed, saying that "their maximum depth of incursion was 10 kilometres from the border. We stopped them. Approximately 20,000 people died." In that same interview, he claimed that the ratio of killed and wounded soldiers "in" Russia is 1 to 3.

On 6 July, Russian milbloggers claimed that the Russian forces in Kharkiv had lost around a third of the casualties that Russia lost during the battle of Avdiivka.

The Ukrainian 71st Jaeger Brigade claimed that they had killed or wounded 1,200 Russian soldiers near Vovchansk in August.

== Impact on civilians ==
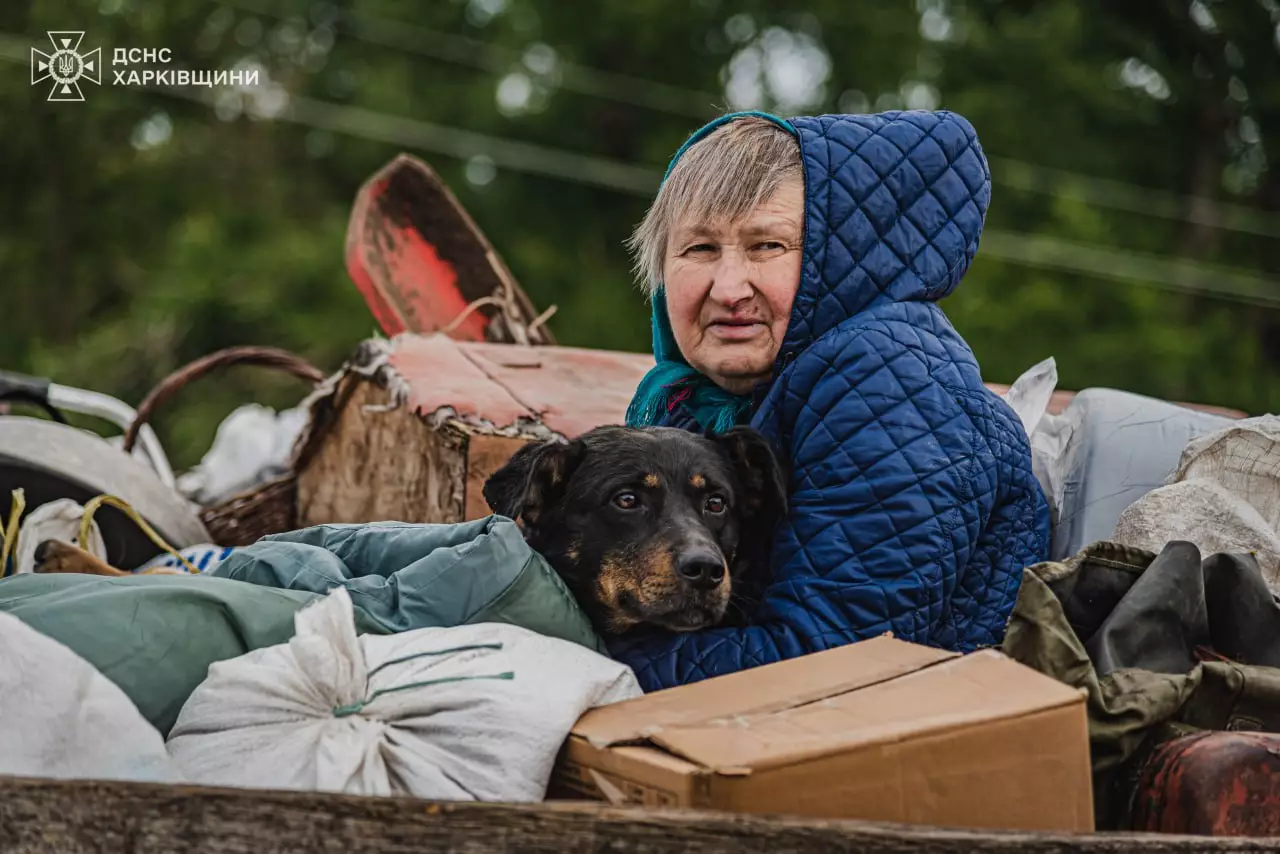
Evacuation of a civilian and their dog from the front-line region

The governor of Kharkiv Oblast reported that, as of 20 May 2024, more than 10,500 residents have been evacuated from areas of Kharkiv Oblast affected by the fighting, particularly in Kharkiv, Bohodukhiv and Chuhuiv raions. By 14 May, only about 400 civilians remained in Vovchansk, with "almost none" in the northern part of the city.

Ukrainian Interior Minister Ihor Klymenko claimed on 16 May that a resident of Vovchansk had been killed by Russian soldiers after refusing to obey their orders and attempting to escape on foot. He also said that other civilians were being forced into basements.

A video shot by aerial reconnaissance over Vovchansk showed the body of a dead civilian man in a wheelchair in the middle of a road near a local hospital that had been occupied by Russian forces. Law enforcement officials reported they opened a proceeding to investigate the circumstances of the death.

On 7 June, the regional governor of Sumy Oblast Volodymyr Artyukh ordered the evacuation of 8 border settlements in Sumy Oblast.

=== Allegations of war crimes ===
Ukrainian police claimed on 17 May that up to 40 civilians, mostly elderly, were being interrogated by people who were calling themselves FSB employees, and alleged that they were being used as human shields by Russian forces, a claim which has not been independently verified.

Furthermore, a Ukrainian military spokesman claimed that Russian forces were looting houses of local residents on the outskirts of Vovchansk, with a video published on Telegram showing a Russian soldier taking a large covered object into a UAZ-3303 truck, purportedly looting.

On June 9, a Ukrainian serviceman reported that Russian forces were attempting to attack positions in Vovchansk while in civilian clothes, hiding machine-guns under said civilian clothes, which constitutes perfidy, a war-crime per Articles 37, 38 and 39 of the Geneva convention.

== See also ==
- List of military engagements during the Russian invasion of Ukraine
- Battle of Kupiansk
- 2023 Ukrainian counteroffensive
- Battle of Chasiv Yar
- Battle of Krasnohorivka
