= Lukiantsi =

Settlement in Kharkiv Oblast, Ukraine

Lukiantsi Лук'янці
- Village
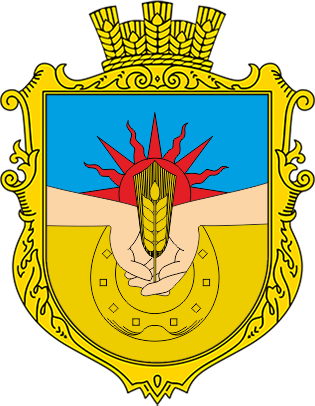
- Coat of arms
- Interactive map of Lukiantsi
- Location of Lukiantsi within Ukraine Lukiantsi (Ukraine)
- Coordinates: 50.248333°N 36.507778°E
- Country: Ukraine
- Oblast: Kharkiv Oblast
- Raion: Kharkiv Raion
- Hromada: Lyptsi rural hromada
- Founded: 1862

Area
  - Total: 0.61 km^{2} (0.24 sq mi)
- Elevation: 131 m (430 ft)

Population (2001 census)
  - Total: 1,192
  - Density: 2,000/km^{2} (5,100/sq mi)
- Time zone: UTC+2 (EET)
  - Summer (DST): UTC+3 (EEST)
- Postal code: 62413
- Area code: +380 57

Lukiantsi (Ukrainian: Лук'янці; Russian: Лукьянцы) is a village in Kharkiv Raion, Kharkiv Oblast, eastern Ukraine. It is situated 31 kilometres (19 mi) northeast of Kharkiv city. It belongs to Lyptsi rural hromada, one of the hromadas of Ukraine.

== History ==
Lukiantsi was founded in 1862 as a settlement within the Russian Empire.

=== Russo-Ukrainian War ===
During the initial eastern campaign of the 2022 Russian invasion of Ukraine, the village was occupied by Russia on or shortly after the first day of the conflict. It was subsequently retaken by Ukrainian forces later that year during its 2022 Kharkiv counteroffensive.

Lukiantsi once again came under direct attack by Russian forces on 13 May 2024, during the 2024 Kharkiv offensive.

On 14 May, DeepState reported the village to be captured by the Russian forces.

On 15 May, a speaker of the Ukrainian military stated that troops were withdrawn from the Lukiantsi and Vovchansk areas to "preserve the lives of our servicemen and avoid losses" and move to "more advantageous positions", and that the situation "remains difficult".

== Demographics ==
As of the 2001 Ukrainian census, the settlement had 1,192 inhabitants, whose native languages were 53.95% Ukrainian, 42.51% Russian, 2.09% Armenian, 0.89% Belarusian and 0.08% Moldovan (Romanian).
