= Valerii Hudz =

Ukrainian soldier and colonel, Hero of Ukraine (1971–2022)

Valerii Fedorovych Hudz
- Валерій Федорович Гудзь
- Born: Valerii Fedorovych Hudz; 12 February 1971; Boryspil, Kyiv Oblast, Ukrainian SSR, Soviet Union
- Died: 12 March 2022 (aged 51); Luhansk Oblast, Ukraine
- Military career
- Allegiance: Ukraine
- Branch: Ukrainian Army
- Service years: 1991–2001; 2014–2022
- Rank: Colonel
- Units: 24th Mechanized Brigade, 72nd Mechanized Brigade
- Conflicts: Russo-Ukrainian War; War in Donbas; Battle on the Border; Battle of Avdiivka; Russian invasion of Ukraine; Eastern Ukraine campaign †
- Awards: Order of the Gold Star (posthumously)

Valerii Fedorovych Hudz (Ukrainian: Валерій Федорович Гудзь; 12 February 1971 – 12 March 2022) was a Ukrainian serviceman.

== Career ==
Hudz's military career began in 1999, and ended in 2001. In 2014, following the Revolution of Dignity and the start of the war in Donbas, Hudz came out of retirement to serve in the Ukrainian Army once more.

He was a Colonel in the Armed Forces of Ukraine, serving as commander of the 24th Mechanized Brigade from 2017 to 2020. Hudz fought in sector "D" on the border war with Russia, in the area of Volnovakha and Avdiivka. He died at age 51 during the Russian invasion of Ukraine in the Luhansk region. He was posthumously awarded the highest award in Ukraine, Hero of Ukraine.
