= Strilecha =

Strilecha Стрілеча
- Village
- Interactive map of Strilecha
- Location of Strilecha within Ukraine Strilecha (Kharkiv Oblast)
- Coordinates: 50.302778°N 36.401389°E
- Country: Ukraine
- Oblast: Kharkiv Oblast
- Raion: Kharkiv Raion
- Hromada: Lyptsi rural hromada
- Founded: 1695

Area
  - Total: 1.4 km^{2} (0.54 sq mi)
- Elevation: 154 m (505 ft)

Population (2001 census)
  - Total: 2,097
  - Density: 1,500/km^{2} (3,900/sq mi)
- Time zone: UTC+2 (EET)
  - Summer (DST): UTC+3 (EEST)
- Postal code: 62411
- Area code: +380 57

Strilecha (Ukrainian: Стрілеча; Russian: Стрелечья) is a village in Kharkiv Raion (district) in Kharkiv Oblast of Ukraine, located 36.44 kilometres (22.64 mi) north-northeast (NNE) from the centre of Kharkiv. The settlement belongs to Lyptsi rural hromada, one of the hromadas of Ukraine.

Strilecha is located at a distance of about 0.5 kilometres (0.31 mi) from the Russia–Ukraine border.

== History ==
Strilecha was founded in 1695 as a frontier settlement of the expanding Tsardom of Russia.

The village was occupied by the Russian military on 24 February 2022, the first day of the Russian invasion of Ukraine. Ukrainian troops first arrived in the village on 13 September 2022, after a counteroffensive in the Kharkiv region. The 247th Battalion of Ukraine's 127th Territorial Defense Brigade announced that its forces had recaptured Strilecha on 13 September 2022, raising the Ukrainian flag in the village.

Strilecha was once again captured by Russian forces on 10 May 2024 during the 2024 Kharkiv offensive.

== Demographics ==
In 2001 the settlement had 2097 inhabitants. Native language as of the Ukrainian Census of 2001:

- Ukrainian – 67.62%
- Russian – 31.64%
- Armenian – 0.18%
- Belarusian – 0.06%
