= Pylna =

Settlement in Kharkiv Oblast, Ukraine

Pylna Пильна
- Village
- Interactive map of Pylna
- Location of Pylna within Ukraine Pylna (Ukraine)
- Coordinates: 50.286944°N 36.517778°E
- Country: Ukraine
- Oblast: Kharkiv Oblast
- Raion: Kharkiv Raion
- Hromada: Lyptsi rural hromada
- Founded: 1885

Area
  - Total: 0.69 km^{2} (0.27 sq mi)
- Elevation: 130 m (430 ft)

Population (2001 census)
  - Total: 211
  - Estimate (2023): 45
  - Density: 310/km^{2} (790/sq mi)
- Time zone: UTC+2 (EET)
  - Summer (DST): UTC+3 (EEST)
- Postal code: 62412
- Area code: +380 57

Pylna (Ukrainian: Пильна; Russian: Пыльная) is a village in Kharkiv Raion (district) in Kharkiv Oblast of eastern Ukraine, 34.93 kilometres (21.70 mi) north-northeast (NNE) of the centre of Kharkiv city. It belongs to Lyptsi rural hromada, one of the hromadas of Ukraine.

== History ==
Pylna was founded in 1885 as a new settlement within the Russian Empire

During the initial eastern campaign of the 2022 Russian invasion of Ukraine, the village was occupied by Russia on 24 February 2022, the first day of the conflict. It was retaken by Ukrainian forces later that year during its 2022 Kharkiv counteroffensive. Pylna was once again captured by Russian forces on 10 May 2024 during the 2024 Kharkiv offensive.

== Demographics ==
As of the 2001 Ukrainian census, the settlement had 211 inhabitants, whose native languages were 64.09% Ukrainian and 35.11% Russian.
