= Lyptsi =

Village in Kharkiv Oblast, Ukraine

Lyptsi Липці
- Village
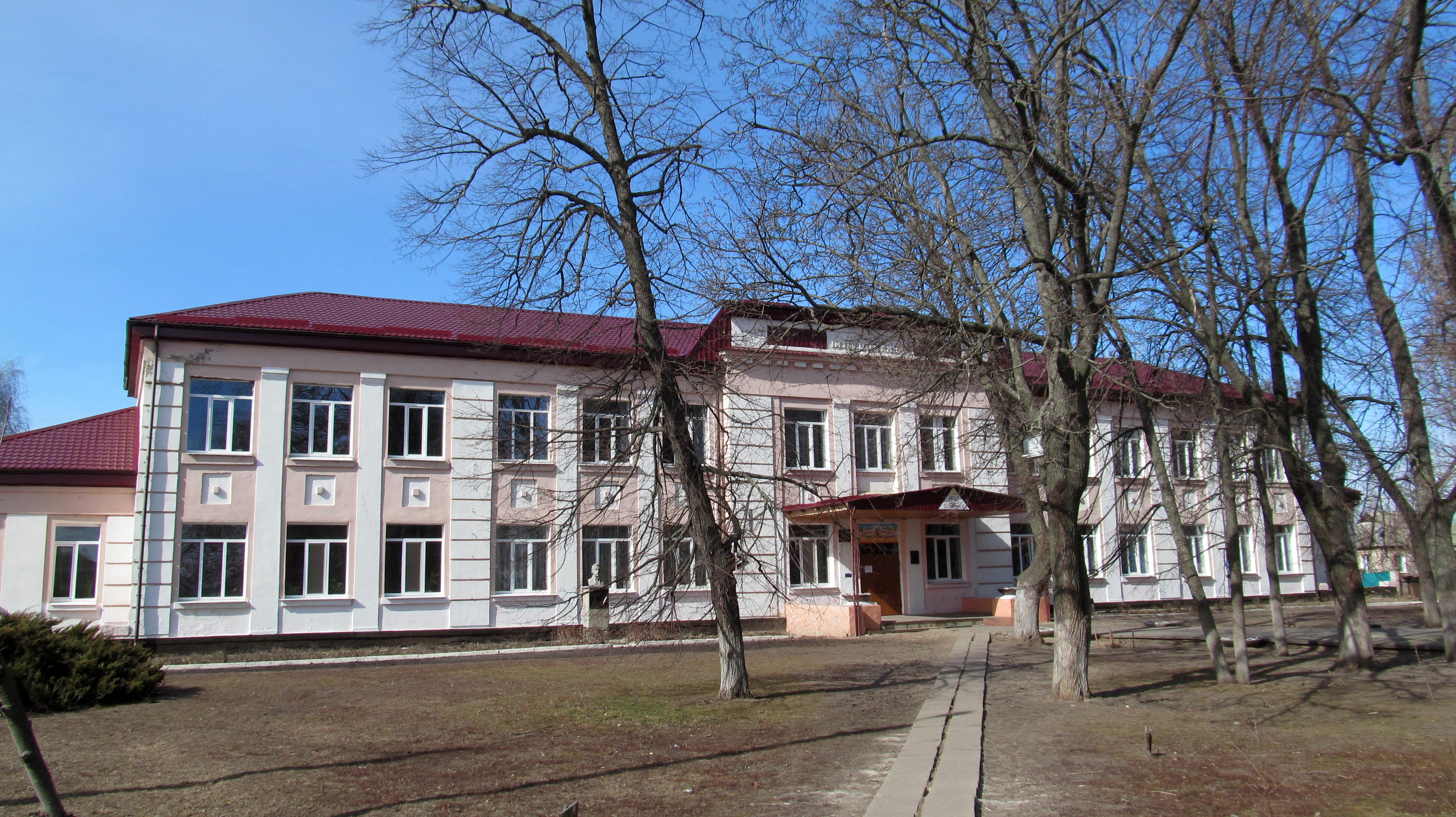
- Lipetsk primary school for the I-III grades

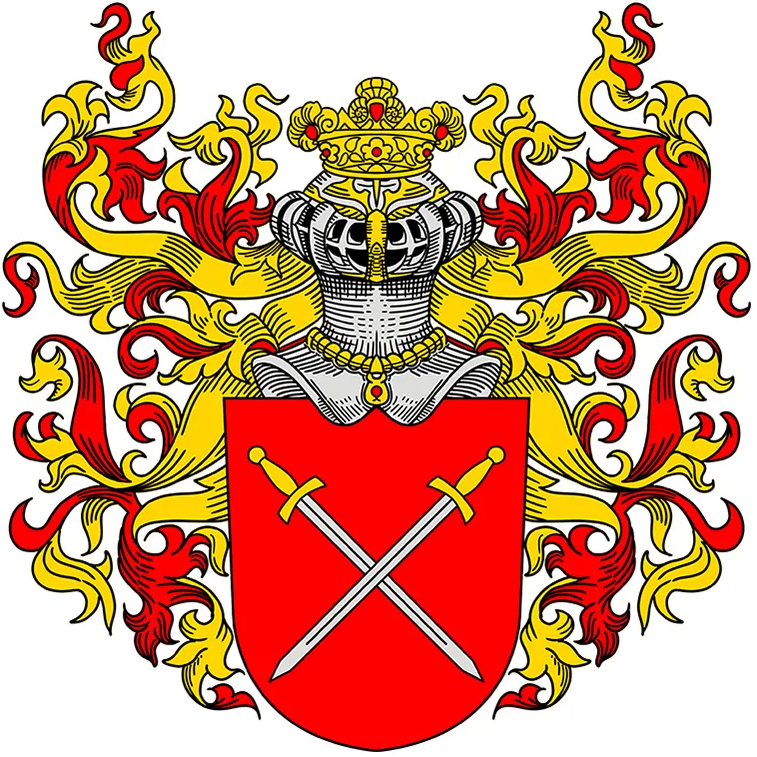
- Coat of arms
- Interactive map of Lyptsi
- Coordinates: 50.209167°N 36.421111°E
- Country: Ukraine
- Oblast: Kharkiv Oblast
- Raion: Kharkiv Raion
- Hromada: Lyptsi rural hromada
- Founded: 1660

Area
  - Total: 5.23 km^{2} (2.02 sq mi)
- Elevation: 113 m (371 ft)

Population (2001 census)
  - Total: 4,209
  - Density: 805/km^{2} (2,080/sq mi)
- Time zone: UTC+2 (EET)
  - Summer (DST): UTC+3 (EEST)
- Postal code: 62414
- Area code: +380 57
- KATOTTH: UA63120090010039403

Lyptsi (Ukrainian: Липці; Russian: Липцы) is a village in the Kharkiv Oblast, Ukraine. The village was founded in 1660. The village had a population of 13,321 in 2020. Lyptsy is the center of the Liptsi territorial community of Kharkiv Raion.

== Geography ==
The village of Liptsi is located northeast of Kharkiv, 10 km from the border with Russia. The Kharkiv River (Siversky Donets basin) and its left tributary, the Liptsi, flow through the village. To the north of the village is the Travianske Reservoir. The administration of the Liptsi Rural Territorial Community is located in the village

Liptsi is located on the slopes of the Central Russian Upland, in the forest-steppe natural zone. The climate of the territory has a temperate continental type with cold winters and hot summers. The average annual temperature is +8.7 °C (in January -4.5, in July +22). The average annual precipitation is 520 mm. The greatest amount of precipitation falls in summer.

Around the village are summer cottages and broad-leaved and pine forests.

== History ==
The village was founded under the Tsardom of Russia in 1660 by peasants from Right-bank Ukraine. The area had fallen under Russian control as a result of the Khmelnytsky Uprising, with the Cossack Hetmanate swearing fealty to the Russian tsar.

=== Russo-Ukrainian War ===
Lyptsi was occupied by the Russian Armed Forces on 24 February 2022, the first day of the Russian invasion of Ukraine.

By 10 May 2022, a major Ukrainian counterattack around Kharkiv city led to Lyptsi becoming contested, according to GlobalSecurity.org, an American defense think tank.

On 13 September 2022, during another Ukrainian counteroffensive in Kharkiv Oblast, the 247th Battalion of Ukraine's 127th Territorial Defense Brigade announced that its forces had recaptured Lyptsi, raising the Ukrainian flag in the village.

== Demographics ==
As of the 2001 Ukrainian census, the settlement had 4,209 inhabitants, whose native languages were 78.00% Ukrainian, 21.40% Russian, 0.24% Belarusian, 0.12% Armenian, 0.05% Moldovan (Romanian) and 0.02% German.
