= 7th Separate Guards Motor Rifle Regiment (Russia) =

- 7-й отдельный гвардейский мотострелковый полк
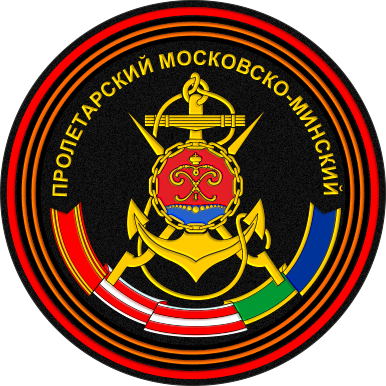
- Founded: 1 June 2002
- Country: Russia
- Branch: Russian Ground Forces
- Type: Mechanized infantry
- Size: Regiment
- Part of: 11th Army Corps
- Garrison/HQ: Kaliningrad, Russia

7th Separate Guards Motor Rifle Regiment (Russian: 7-й отдельный гвардейский мотострелковый полк) (MUN 06414) is a tactical formation of the Ground Forces of the Russian Armed Forces. The formation is part of the 11th Army Corps. It is headquartered in Kaliningrad, Kaliningrad Oblast.

== History ==
The 7th Separate Guards Motor Rifle Regiment inherits the awards, historical record, military glory and honorary titles of the 1st Guards Motor Rifle Proletarian Moscow-Minsk Order of Lenin, Twice Red Banner, Orders of Suvorov and Kutuzov Division.

On December 29, 1926, the 1st Proletarian Rifle Division was formed on the basis of the Separate Moscow Rifle Regiment. In 1936, in honor of the 10th anniversary of its formation and for its success in combat and political training, the Central Executive Committee of the Soviet Union awarded the division the Honorary Revolutionary Red Banner, which is equivalent to the Order of the Red Banner, and 15 of its commanders were awarded the Orders of Lenin and the Red Banner. The division was given the honorary title "Moscow".

In the first days of the Great Patriotic War, on June 26, 1941, the unit's servicemen received their baptism of fire on the Berezina River, becoming an iron wall against one of Heinz Wilhelm Guderian's tank corps. On August 31, 1941, for its unparalleled feat in heavy defensive battles, the division was awarded the Order of the Red Banner, and on September 22, it was one of the first to be awarded the honorary title of "Guards".

On December 18, 1941, the unit's servicemen defended the approaches to Moscow and went on the offensive near Naro-Fominsk. By January 15, 1942, the division reached the approaches to the Vereya River. During 1942 and the winter of 1943, the division, operating as part of the 43rd and 16th armies, was involved in the liberation of the cities of Medyn, Vyazma, Kaluga, and Sukhinichi.

In July-August 1943, the division, as part of the 11th Guards Army, took an active part in the Battle of Kursk. In the second half of August 1943, as part of the Bryansk Front, the division was involved in the battles to liberate the cities of Karachev and Bryansk. During the winter of 1943-44, the division waged heavy offensive battles in the Vitebsk direction. For its unparalleled feats in the liberation of the capital of Soviet Belarus, Minsk, on July 13, 1944, the division received the name "Minsk".

On November 14, 1944, for exemplary execution of command assignments to break through the defense and invade East Prussia, and for the valor and heroism displayed in the process, the division was awarded the Order of Lenin.

In January-April 1945, the unit's servicemen, as part of the 11th Guards Army, fought fierce battles for Gumbinnen, Altenberg, and other heavily fortified enemy strongholds in East Prussia. By April 1945, the division's military units, overcoming stubborn resistance from the Nazis, had come close to Königsberg and were the first to break into the city. On April 9, 1945, Moscow saluted the heroes of the assault on Königsberg, informing the world of the defeat of the East Prussian group.

From April 21 to 26, the division was involved in the destruction of the Wehrmacht group in the Pillau area. The division's combat operations in the Great Patriotic War ended with the storming of the city of Pillau.

On May 28, 1945, for heroism and courage during the storming of Königsberg, the division was awarded the Order of Kutuzov, 2nd degree.

During the war, 16 soldiers of the division were awarded the title Hero of the Soviet Union. 17 streets of Kaliningrad were named after the heroic guardsmen of the "Proletarka". Over the years of the Great Patriotic War, more than one hundred thousand people passed through the ranks of the 1st Guards Division. 25 sets of company and platoon commanders changed from 1941 to 1945. Most of them died."

In 1957, the 1st Guards Rifle Division was reformed into the 1st Guards Motor Rifle Division, while maintaining continuity, regalia, and military glory.

On June 1, 2002, the division was reformed into the 7th Separate Guards Motor Rifle Brigade.

On December 1, 2008, the unit was reformed into the 7th Separate Guards Motor Rifle Regiment.

On December 16-17, 2016, the regiment celebrated the 90th anniversary of the unit.

The Security Service of Ukraine accuses two servicemen of the regiment of war crimes during the Russian invasion of Ukraine in 2022. According to the service, in the spring of 2022, in the captured parts of the Kupyansk and Izyum districts of the Kharkiv Oblast, Russian troops detained and killed local residents, stole property, household appliances, including 6 cars and trucks, which they intended to transport to Russia. The SBU suspects Russian serviceman Vitaly Poddubny of murdering a local farmer in the village of Bezmiatezhne in the Kupyansky district, after which Poddubny, together with Alexey Gorbunov and a serviceman from the 202nd regiment, Ruslan Goncharov, dismembered and burned the body. The servicemen are suspected in absentia of violating the laws and customs of war.

Members of Ukraine's 93rd Mechanized Brigade claimed that captured members of the 7th Regiment said that their unit had been flown from Kaliningrad to Russia's Belgorod Oblast and subsequently deployed to an area south of Balakliia in the Kharkiv Oblast, near the villages of Nova Husarivka and Bairak, in March 2022. In September 2022, the commander of Ukraine's 3rd Tank Brigade claimed that his forces had pushed the 7th Regiment out of the village of Shchurivka, in the same area.
