= Husarivka =

Husarivka (Ukrainian: Гусарівка) may refer to several settlements in Ukraine:

- Husarivka, Balakliia urban hromada, in Izium Raion, Kharkiv Oblast
- Husarivka, Barvinkove urban hromada, in Izium Raion, Kharkiv Oblast
- Husarivka, Zhytomyr Oblast

== See also ==
- Nova Husarivka
