= 3rd Heavy Mechanized Brigade =

Ukrainian Ground Forces unit

3rd Heavy Mechanized Brigade (2025 – present) 3rd Tank Brigade (2016 – 2025)
- 3-тя важка механізована бригада 3-tia vazhka mekhanizovana bryhada
- Shoulder sleeve patch
- Active: 2016 – present
- Country: Ukraine
- Branch: Ukrainian Ground Forces
- Role: Mechanized Infantry
- Size: Brigade
- Nickname: Iron Brigade
- Engagements: War in Donbas; Russian invasion of Ukraine; 2022 Kharkiv counteroffensive; 2023 Ukrainian counteroffensive

Commanders
- Notable commanders: Col. Roman Sheremet

Insignia
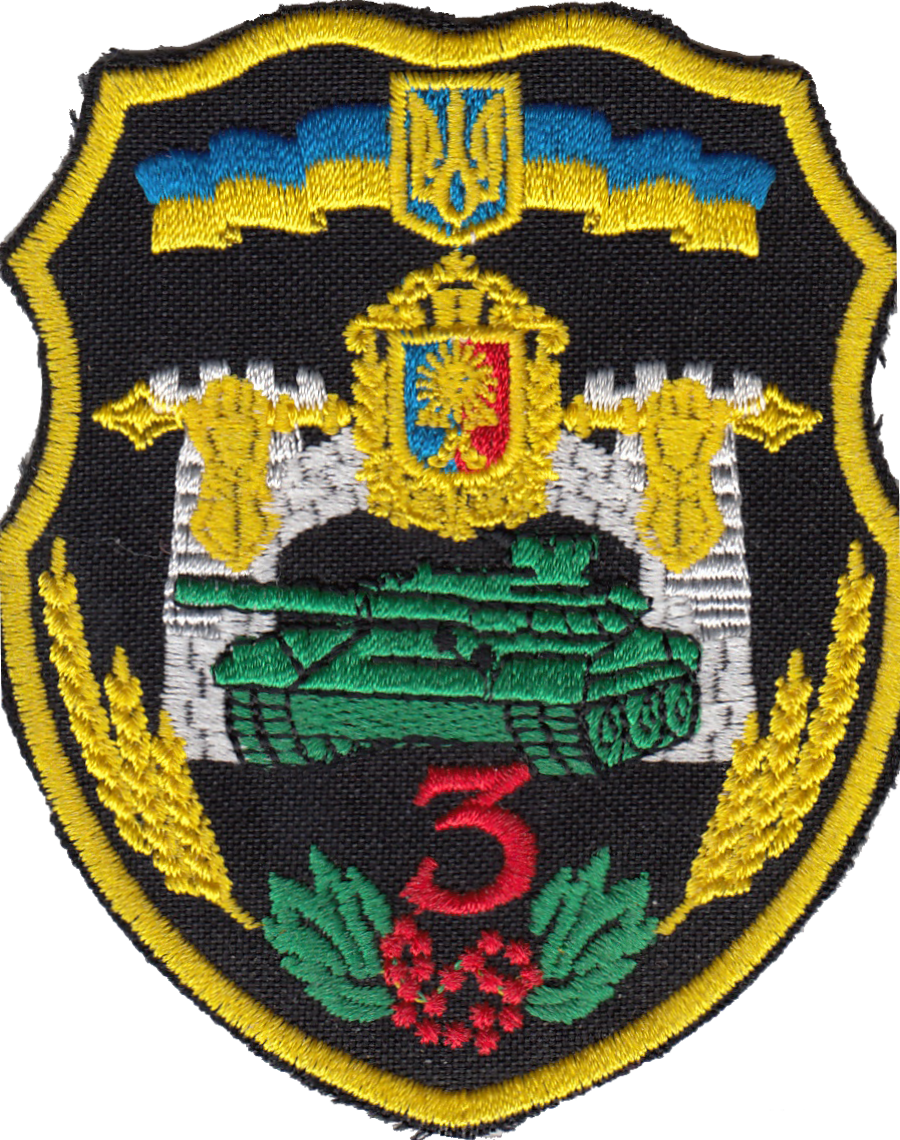
- Former sleeve patch

The 3rd Heavy Mechanized Brigade (Note: Ukrainian: 3-тя важка механізована бригада, romanized: 3-tia vazhka mekhanizovana bryhada) is a brigade of the Ukrainian Ground Forces.

== History ==
=== Formation ===
The brigade was formed in 2016 as a reserve unit. It was armed with T-72 tanks. Before February 2022, it was composed of only 130 personnel, who were tasked with maintaining its equipment.

=== Russian invasion of Ukraine ===
Following the start of the 2022 Russian invasion of Ukraine, the brigade's ranks were filled with mobilized soldiers. As the brigade's units were being assembled, they were deployed to different front lines, including to Kyiv, Izium, Kharkiv, Sloviansk, and Zaporizhzhia.

On 15 March, a few hours after arriving in Barvinkove, a company of six tanks from the 3rd Brigade took part in an assault on the village of Topolske, on the Izium front in the Kharkiv Oblast. The brigade's commander later claimed that about two dozen Russian tanks were stationed in the village and that nine were destroyed during combat, but Ukrainian forces failed to retake the village.

In September, units of the 3rd Tank Brigade participated in a major Ukrainian offensive in the Kharkiv Oblast. In cooperation with other Ukrainian forces, the brigade's units took part in the recapture of the settlements of Nova Husarivka, Bairak, Shchurivka and Balakliia. Neil Hauer reported that elements of the 3rd Tank Brigade were also among the Ukrainian units which retook Izium, as part of the same offensive.

Also in September 2022, units of the brigade took part in combat at Mar'yinka in the Donetsk Oblast.

In March 2023, elements of the brigade were positioned in the Kharkiv Oblast. In June of the same year, a unit of the brigade was positioned near Vovchansk on the Russia-Ukraine border.

The 2nd Battalion of the 3rd Brigade took part in a December 2024 operation to recapture the village of Novomlynsk in the Kharkiv region.

In July 2025, it was announced that the 3rd Tank Brigade had been reformed into the 3rd Heavy Mechanized Brigade.

== Structure ==
- 3rd Heavy Mechanized Brigade "Iron"
  - Headquarters
    - 9th Separate Tank Battalion
      - Headquarters
      - 3x Tank Companies (T-72 variants, T-84 Oplot)
      - Reconnaissance Platoon
      - Anti-Aircraft Platoon (9K38 Igla, FIM-92 Stinger, Mistral MANPADS)
      - Engineer & Sapper Platoon
      - Signals Platoon
      - Medical Station
      - Support Company
        - Technical Support Platoon
        - Material Support Platoon
    - 10th Separate Tank Battalion
      - Headquarters
      - 3x Tank Companies (T-72 variants, T-84 Oplot)
      - Reconnaissance Platoon
      - Anti-Aircraft Platoon (9K38 Igla, FIM-92 Stinger, Mistral MANPADS)
      - Engineer & Sapper Platoon
      - Signals Platoon
      - Medical Station
      - Support Company
        - Technical Support Platoon
        - Material Support Platoon
    - 11th Separate Tank Battalion
      - Headquarters
      - 3x Tank Companies (T-72 variants, T-84 Oplot)
      - Reconnaissance Platoon
      - Anti-Aircraft Platoon (9K38 Igla, FIM-92 Stinger, Mistral MANPADS)
      - Engineer & Sapper Platoon
      - Signals Platoon
      - Medical Station
      - Support Company
        - Technical Support Platoon
        - Material Support Platoon
    - Mechanized Battalion
      - Headquarters
      - 3x Mechanized Companies (BMP-1)
      - Grenade Launcher Platoon (AGS-17)
      - Reconnaissance Platoon
      - Mortar Battery (120mm/82mm mortars)
      - Anti-Aircraft Platoon (9K38 Igla, FIM-92 Stinger, Mistral MANPADS)
      - Engineer & Sapper Platoon
      - Signals Platoon
      - Medical Station
      - Support Company
        - Technical Support Platoon
        - Material Support Platoon
    - 1st Rifle Battalion
      - Headquarters
      - 3x Rifle Companies
      - Fire Support Company
      - Reconnaissance Platoon
      - Mortar Battery (120mm/82mm mortars)
      - Engineer & Sapper Platoon
      - Signals Platoon
      - Medical Station
      - Technical Support Platoon
      - Material Support Platoon
    - 2nd Infantry Battalion "Joker"
      - Headquarters
      - 3x Infantry Companies
      - Fire Support Company
      - Reconnaissance Platoon
      - Mortar Battery (120mm/82mm mortars)
      - Engineer & Sapper Platoon
      - Signals Platoon
      - Medical Station
      - Technical Support Platoon
      - Material Support Platoon
    - 36th Separate Rifle Battalion "Steppe Wolves" (Attached)
      - Headquarters
      - 3x Infantry Companies
      - Fire Support Company
      - Reconnaissance Platoon
      - Mortar Battery (120mm/82mm mortars)
        - Rocket Artillery Platoon ("Soroka" MLRS)
      - Engineer & Sapper Platoon
      - Signals Platoon
      - Medical Station
      - Technical Support Platoon
      - Material Support Platoon
    - Artillery Group
      - Headquarters & Target Acquisition Battery (Leleka-100 & A1-CM Furia drones)
        - BUAR UAV Group (Drops/Observation)
      - 1st Self-propelled Artillery Battalion (2S1 Gvozdika)
      - 2nd Self-propelled Artillery Battalion (2S3 Akatsiya)
      - 30th Rocket Artillery Battalion (BM-21 Grad, Bastion-01)
      - Anti-Tank Artillery Battalion (FGM-148 Javelin)
    - Sniper Platoon
    - Reconnaissance Platoon
    - Anti-Aircraft Defense Battalion (ZU-23)
    - Engineer Battalion (BAT-2)
    - Transmissions Company
    - Radar Company
    - Medical Company
    - CBRN Protection Company
    - Commandant's Platoon
    - Repair and Restoration Battalion (BREM-1)
    - Logistics Battalion
