= Donets, Ukraine =

Rural locality in Kharkiv Oblast, Ukraine

Donets Донець
- Rural settlement
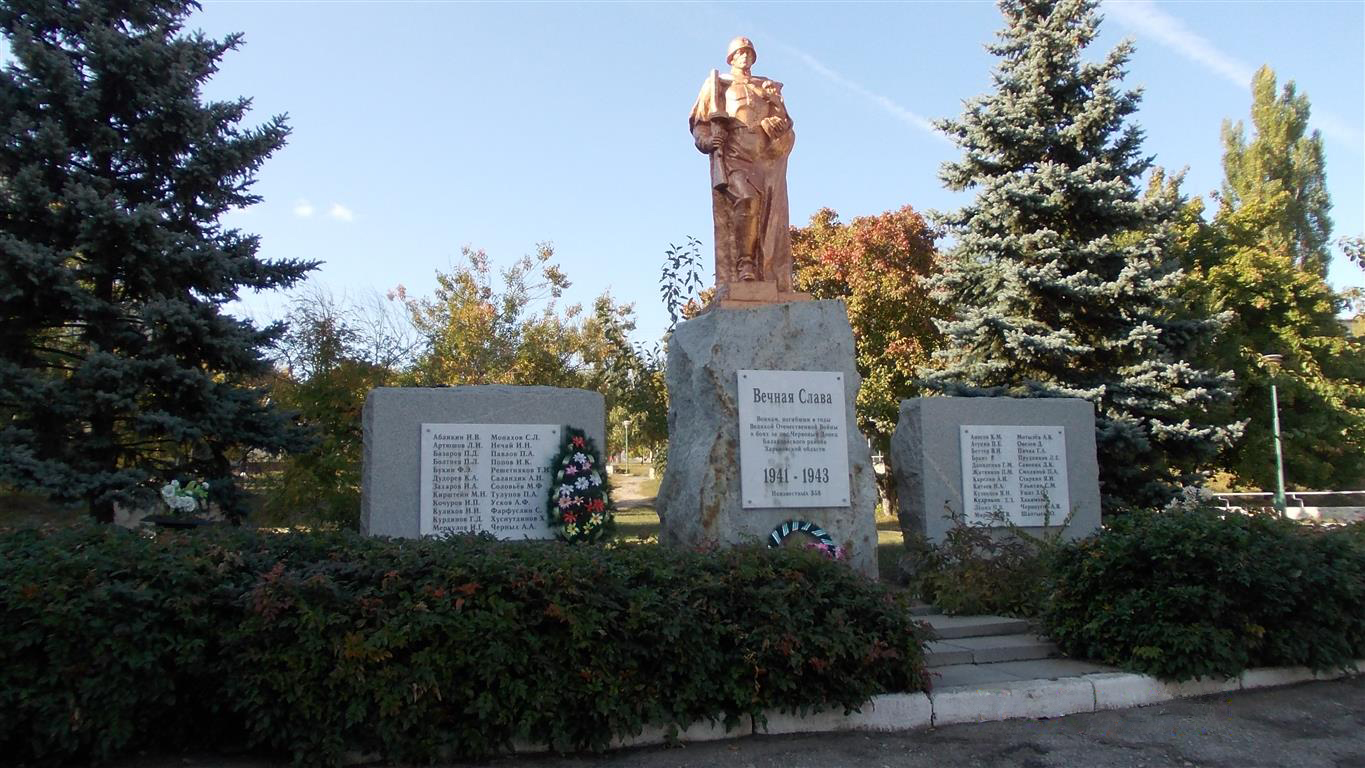
- Monument to the Red Army soldiers fallen during World War II in the village.

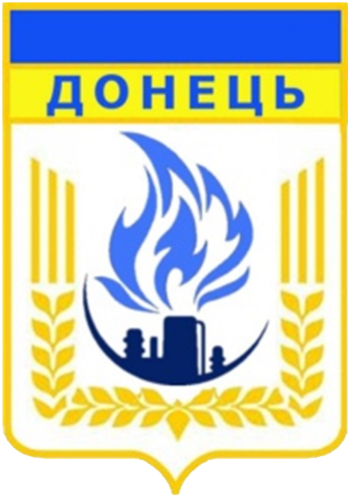
- Coat of arms
- Interactive map of Donets
- Location in Kharkiv Oblast Location in Ukraine
- Coordinates: 49°30′30″N 36°34′16″E
- Country: Ukraine
- Oblast: Kharkiv Oblast
- Raion: Izium Raion
- Hromada: Donets settlement hromada
- Established: c. 1850

Population (2022)
  - Total: 8,450
- Time zone: UTC+2 (EET)
  - Summer (DST): UTC+3 (EEST)
- Postal code: 64250
- KATOTTH: UA59080170010043659

Donets (Ukrainian: Донець, Russian: Донец), until May 2016 Chervonyi Donets (Ukrainian: Червоний Донець, Russian: Червоный Донец), is a rural settlement in Izium Raion, Kharkiv Oblast, Ukraine. Donets hosts the administration of Donets settlement hromada, one of the hromadas of Ukraine. Population: 8,450 (2022 estimate). The Donets village was one of the richest communities in Ukraine in 2020 and 2021.

== Geography ==
The Donets is located at the confluence of the Shebelinka on the right bank of the Donets River. On the opposite bank are many lakes, including Lake Liman, the Andreevsky Bor tract, and the urban-type settlement of Andriivka. The Shebelynskoye gas field is nearby, and gas and condensate pipelines run through it.

== History ==
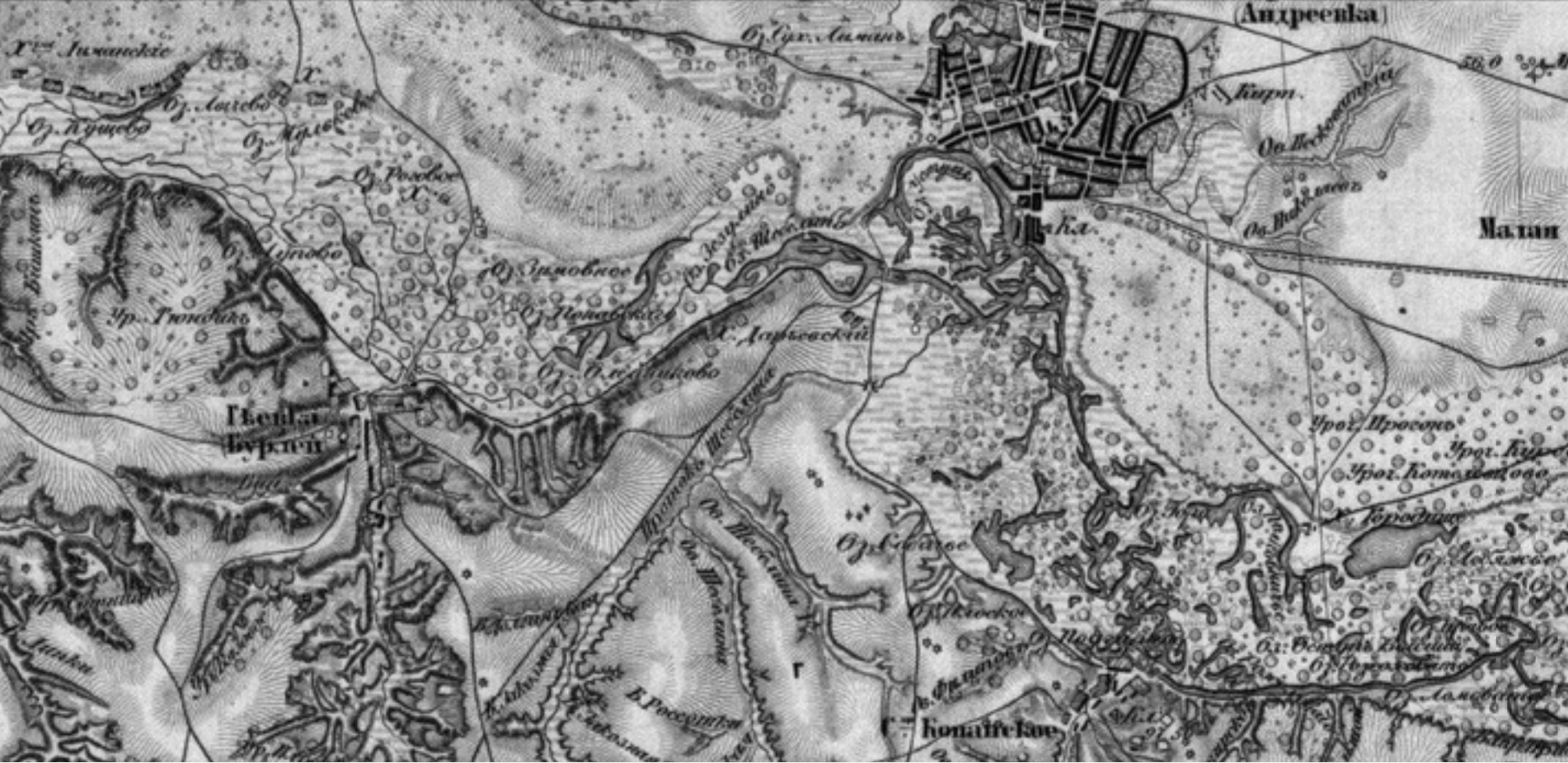
Daryevsky farmstead on F.F. Schubert's Three-Verst Military Topographic Map of the Russian Empire.

In 1860, Darevsky farmstead was established. In 1924, after Ukrainian SSR was established, Chervony Donets farmstead was created. In 1956, after the discovery of the Shebelinskoye gas field, construction began on the Chervony Donets settlement for gas workers and drillers, which was granted urban-type settlement status in 1959. In 1983, with the assistance of the Shebelinsky Gas Production Department, a television center was created in the Chervonodonetsk Secondary School (put into operation in January 1984).

In January 1989 the population was 9653 people. In May 1995, the Cabinet of Ministers of Ukraine approved the decision to privatize the experimental plant located here. In January 2013 the population was 8997 people.

On 19 May 2016, Verkhovna Rada adopted decision to rename Chervonyi Donets to Donets, conforming to the law prohibiting names of Communist origin.

Until 18 July 2020, Donets belonged to Balakliia Raion. The raion was abolished in July 2020 as part of the administrative reform of Ukraine, which reduced the number of raions of Kharkiv Oblast to seven. The area of Balakliia Raion was merged into Izium Raion.

Until 26 January 2024, Donets was designated urban-type settlement. On this day, a new law entered into force which abolished this status, and Donets became a rural settlement.

== Economy ==
=== Transportation ===
Donets has access (via a bridge) to the R78 Highway connecting Kharkiv and Balakliia, and is also connected by road with Pervomaiskyi.

=== Enterprises ===
- City-forming enterprise "Shebelinkagazvydobuvannya" Naftogaz of Ukraine.
- Cable television operator "Quorum" LLC.
- Solid waste landfill of the housing and communal services "Chervony Donetsk", 2.25 hectares.
- Sports and fitness center "FOK Gazovic".

== Education and culture ==
- Two schools and a children's music school
- A Palace of Culture, one children's and two public libraries.
- The Children's health camp "Fakel" (sanatorium-type).
- Services are held in the temple of the UOC (MP) Archangel Michael (built in 2000).

== Sports ==
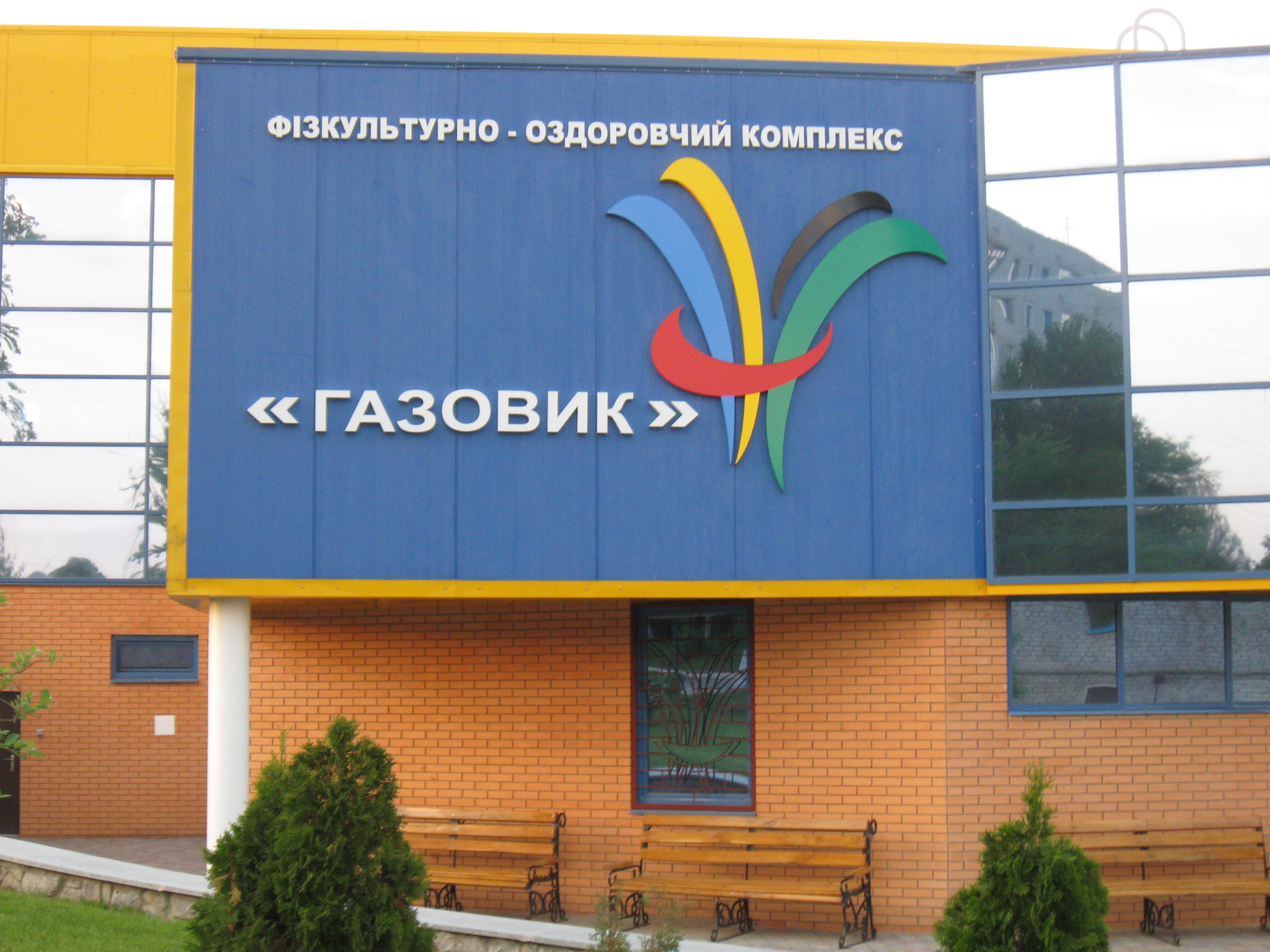
Gazovik Sports and Fitness Complex.

- The village is home to the Gazovik football club, which plays its home games at the regional stadium "Gazovik."
- The Gazovik Sports and Fitness Complex (opened on October 11, 2011).
- Rowing facilities.

== Monuments ==
- Monuments to participants and victims of the Great Patriotic War, to the heroic liquidators of the Chernobyl disaster, and a memorial plaque to soldiers of the Afghan War.
