= Yakovenkove, Kharkiv Oblast =

Village in Kharkiv Oblast, Ukraine

Yakovenkove Яковенкове
- Village
- Interactive map of Yakovenkove
- Location of Yakovenkove in Kharkiv Oblast Yakovenkove (Ukraine)
- Coordinates: 49.528973°N 36.91498°E
- Country: Ukraine
- Oblast: Kharkiv Oblast
- Raion: Izium Raion
- Hromada: Balakliia urban hromada

Area
  - Total: 2.278 km^{2} (0.880 sq mi)
- Elevation: 93 m (305 ft)

Population (2001 census)
  - Total: 1,123
  - Density: 493.0/km^{2} (1,277/sq mi)
- Time zone: UTC+2 (EET)
  - Summer (DST): UTC+3 (EEST)
- Postal code: 64225
- Area code: +380 5749

Yakovenkove (Ukrainian: Яковенкове; Russian: Яковенково), also known as Iakovenkove, is a village in Izium Raion (district) in Kharkiv Oblast of eastern Ukraine, at about 71.5 kilometres (44.4 mi) southeast by east (SEbE) from the centre of Kharkiv city, at about 4 kilometres (2.5 mi) north-northeast (NNE) from the northern border of Balakliia (Balakliya).

The settlement came under attack by Russian forces during the Russian invasion of Ukraine in 2022 and was regained by Ukrainian forces by the beginning of September the same year.
