= Andriivka, Kharkiv Oblast =

Rural locality in Kharkiv Oblast, Ukraine

Andriivka Андріївка
- Rural settlement
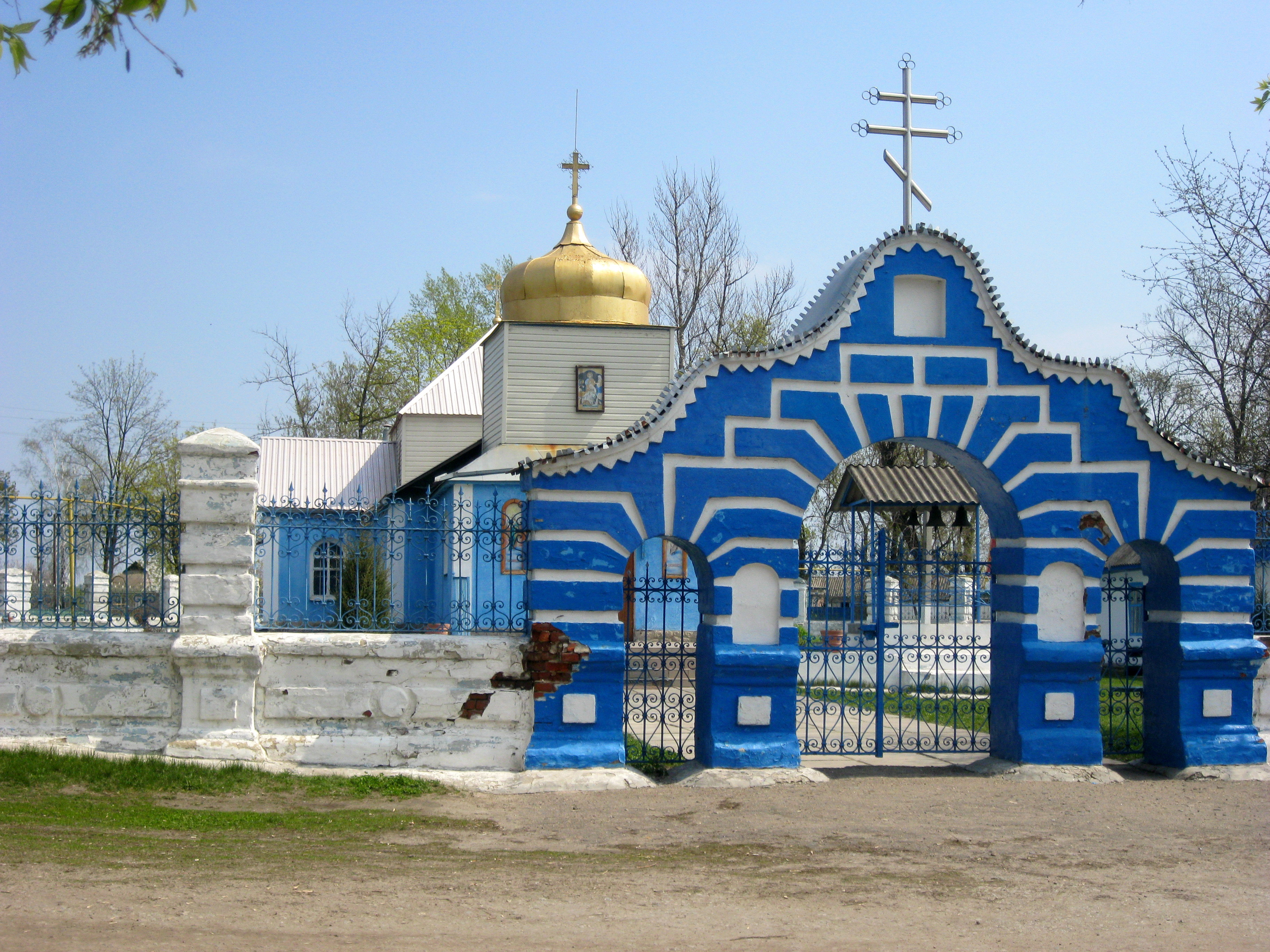
- Nativity of the Theotokos Church
- Interactive map of Andriivka
- Location in Kharkiv Oblast Location in Ukraine
- Coordinates: 49°32′05″N 36°36′48″E
- Country: Ukraine
- Oblast: Kharkiv Oblast
- Raion: Izium Raion

Population (2022)
  - Total: 8,372
- Time zone: UTC+2 (EET)
  - Summer (DST): UTC+3 (EEST)

Andriivka (Ukrainian: Андріївка; Russian: Андреевка) is a rural settlement in Izium Raion, Kharkiv Oblast, Ukraine. It is located on the left bank of the Siverskyi Donets. Andriivka belongs to Donets settlement hromada, one of the hromadas of Ukraine. Population: 8,372 (2022 estimate).

== History ==
Until 18 July 2020, Andriivka belonged to Balakliia Raion. The raion was abolished in July 2020 as part of the administrative reform of Ukraine, which reduced the number of raions of Kharkiv Oblast to seven. The area of Balakliia Raion was merged into Izium Raion.

Until 26 January 2024, Andriivka was designated urban-type settlement. On this day, a new law entered into force which abolished this status, and Andriivka became a rural settlement.

== Economy ==
=== Transportation ===
Shebelinka and Andriivka railway stations are both located in Andriivka and are on the railway line connecting Kharkiv and Lyman via Izium. There is frequent passenger traffic.

The settlement has road access to both Kharkiv and Izium, via Balakliia.

== Notable people ==
- Petro Shelest (1908–1996), First Secretary of the Communist Party of Ukraine (1963–1972)
