= Savyntsi =

Rural locality in Kharkiv Oblast, Ukraine

Savyntsi Савинці
- Rural settlement
- Location in Kharkiv Oblast Location in Ukraine
- Coordinates: 49°23′44″N 37°03′24″E
- Country: Ukraine
- Oblast: Kharkiv Oblast
- Raion: Izium Raion

Population (2022)
  - Total: 5,182
  - Estimate (2026): ▼2,984
- Time zone: UTC+2 (EET)
  - Summer (DST): UTC+3 (EEST)

Savyntsi (Ukrainian: Савинці, Russian: Са́винцы) is a rural settlement in Izium Raion of Kharkiv Oblast in Ukraine. It is located on the left bank of the Siverskyi Donets. Savyntsi hosts the administration of Savyntsi settlement hromada, one of the hromadas of Ukraine. Population: 5,182 (2022 estimate).

== History ==
Until 18 July 2020, Savyntsi belonged to Balakliia Raion. The raion was abolished in July 2020 as part of the administrative reform of Ukraine, which reduced the number of raions of Kharkiv Oblast to seven. The area of Balakliia Raion was merged into Izium Raion.

Until 26 January 2024, Savyntsi was designated urban-type settlement. On this day, a new law entered into force which abolished this status, and Savyntsi became a rural settlement.

== Economy ==
=== Transportation ===
Savyntsi railway station is on the railway line connecting Kharkiv and Lyman via Izium. There is frequent passenger traffic.

The settlement has road access to Highway M03 connecting Kharkiv and Sloviansk. It is also connected by local roads with Kharkiv via Balakliia and with Kupiansk via Borova.
