= Protopopivka, Izium Raion, Kharkiv Oblast =

Village in Kharkiv Oblast, Ukraine

Protopopivka Протопопівка
- Village
- Interactive map of Protopopivka
- Location of Protopopivka within Ukraine Protopopivka (Ukraine)
- Coordinates: 49.2425°N 36.913333°E
- Country: Ukraine
- Oblast: Kharkiv Oblast
- District: Izium Raion
- Hromada: Balakliia urban hromada
- Founded: 1704

Area
  - Total: 3.607 km^{2} (1.393 sq mi)
- Elevation: 112 m (367 ft)

Population (2001 census)
  - Total: 1,253
  - Density: 347.4/km^{2} (899.7/sq mi)
- Time zone: UTC+2 (EET)
  - Summer (DST): UTC+3 (EEST)
- Postal code: 64281
- Area code: +380 5749

Protopopivka (Ukrainian: Протопопівка; Russian: Протопоповка) is a village in Izium Raion (district) in Kharkiv Oblast of eastern Ukraine, at about 92 kilometres (57 mi) southeast by south from the centre of Kharkiv city, on the right bank of the Siverskyi Donets river.

The village came under attack by Russian forces in June 2022, during the Russian invasion of Ukraine.
