= Borshchivka, Izium Raion =

Village in Kharkiv Oblast, Ukraine

Borshchivka Борщівка
- Village
- Interactive map of Borshchivka
- Borshchivka in Kharkiv Oblast Borshchivka (Ukraine)
- Coordinates: 49.508233°N 36.974227°E
- Country: Ukraine
- Oblast: Kharkiv Oblast
- Raion: Izium Raion
- Hromada: Balakliia urban hromada
- Founded: 1668

Area
  - Total: 2.595 km^{2} (1.002 sq mi)
- Elevation: 89 m (292 ft)

Population (2001 census)
  - Total: 1,281
  - Density: 493.6/km^{2} (1,279/sq mi)
- Time zone: UTC+2 (EET)
  - Summer (DST): UTC+3 (EEST)
- Postal code: 64240
- Area code: +380 5749

Borshchivka (Ukrainian: Борщівка; Russian: Борщовка) is a village in Izium Raion (district) in Kharkiv Oblast of eastern Ukraine, at about 71.1 kilometres (44.2 mi) south-east from the centre of Kharkiv city.

The settlement came under attack by Russian forces during the Russian invasion of Ukraine in 2022.

== Demographics ==
The settlement had 1281 inhabitants in 2001, native language distribution as of the Ukrainian Census of 2001:

- Ukrainian: 91.87%
- Russian: 6.73%
- Belarusian: 0.23%
- Greek: 0.23%
- Romani: 0.27%
- other languages: 0.86%
