= Druzheliubivka, Kharkiv Oblast =

Village in Izium Raion, Ukraine

Druzheliubivka Дружелюбівка
- Village
- Interactive map of Druzheliubivka
- Location of Druzheliubivka within Ukraine Druzheliubivka (Ukraine)
- Coordinates: 49.263056°N 37.855°E
- Country: Ukraine
- Oblast: Kharkiv Oblast
- Raion: Izium Raion
- Hromada: Borova rural hromada
- Founded: 1790

Area
  - Total: 7.8 km^{2} (3.0 sq mi)
- Elevation: 92 m (302 ft)

Population (2001 census)
  - Total: 347
  - Estimate (2026): 14
  - Density: 44/km^{2} (120/sq mi)
- Time zone: UTC+2 (EET)
  - Summer (DST): UTC+3 (EEST)
- Postal code: 63801
- Area code: +380 5759

Druzheliubivka (Ukrainian: Дружелюбівка; Russian: Дружелюбовка) is a village in the Izium Raion of Kharkiv Oblast in eastern Ukraine, at about 141.95 kilometres (88.20 mi) southeast by east (SEbE) of the centre of Kharkiv city. It belongs to Borova rural hromada, one of the hromadas of Ukraine. On 4 July 2026, it was captured by Russian forces.

== Demographics ==
In 2001 the settlement had 347 inhabitants, native language as of the 2001 Ukrainian census:

- Ukrainian – 94.94%
- Russian – 4.78%
