= Verbivka, Kharkiv Oblast =

Village in Kharkiv Oblast, Ukraine

Verbivka Вербівка
- Village
- Interactive map of Verbivka
- Location of Verbivka in Kharkiv Oblast Verbivka (Ukraine)
- Coordinates: 49°29′18″N 36°49′47″E
- Country: Ukraine
- Oblast: Kharkiv Oblast
- Raion: Izium Raion
- Hromada: Balakliia urban hromada
- Founded: 1830

Area
  - Total: 3.395 km^{2} (1.311 sq mi)
- Elevation: 83 m (272 ft)

Population (2001 census)
  - Total: 3,507
  - Density: 1,033/km^{2} (2,675/sq mi)
- Time zone: UTC+2 (EET)
  - Summer (DST): UTC+3 (EEST)
- Postal code: 64219
- Area code: +380 5749
- KATOTTH: UA63040010070080766

Verbivka (Ukrainian: Вербівка; Russian: Вербовка) is a village in Izium Raion (district) in Kharkiv Oblast of eastern Ukraine, at about 71.0 kilometres (44.1 mi) southeast by south (SEbS) from the centre of Kharkiv city. It belongs to Balakliia urban hromada, one of the hromadas of Ukraine.

== History ==
The settlement was founded in 1830 under the Russian Empire.

Until 18 July 2020, Verbivka belonged to Balakliia Raion. The raion was abolished in July 2020 as part of the administrative reform of Ukraine, which reduced the number of raions of Kharkiv Oblast to seven. The area of Balakliia Raion was merged into Izium Raion.

=== Russian invasion of Ukraine ===
The settlement came under attack by Russian forces during the Russian invasion of Ukraine in 2022 and was regained by Ukrainian forces in the beginning of September the same year.

== Demographics ==
As of the 2001 Ukrainian census, the settlement had 3,507 inhabitants, whose native languages were 90.35% Ukrainian, 8.51% Russian and 0.03% Moldovan (Romanian).
