= Zelenyi Hai, Izium Raion, Kharkiv Oblast =

Rural locality in Kharkiv Oblast, Ukraine

Coordinates: 49°24′31″N 37°47′23″E

Zelenyi Hai (Ukrainian: Зелений Гай) is a village in Izium Raion, Kharkiv Oblast, Ukraine. It belongs to Borova settlement hromada, one of the hromadas of Ukraine.

Until 18 July 2020, Zelenyi Hai belonged to Borova Raion. The raion was abolished in July 2020 as part of the administrative reform of Ukraine, which reduced the number of raions of Kharkiv Oblast to seven. The area of Borova Raion was merged into Izium Raion.
