= Balakliia urban hromada =

Balakliia urban hromada Балаклійська міська громада
- Hromada
- Interactive map of Balakliia urban hromada
- Country: Ukraine
- Oblast: Kharkiv
- Raion: Izium
- Admin. center: Balakliia

Area
  - Total: 1,299.5 km^{2} (501.7 sq mi)

Population (2020)
  - Total: 46,142
  - Density: 35.508/km^{2} (91.964/sq mi)
- CATOTTG code: UA63040010000010092
- Settlements: 37
- Cities: 1
- Rural settlements: 1
- Villages: 35

Balakliia urban hromada (Ukrainian: Балаклійська міська територіальна громада) is a hromada of Ukraine, located in Izium Raion, Kharkiv Oblast. Its administrative center is the city Balakliia. The area of the hromada is 1,299.5 square kilometres (501.7 mi^{2}), and its population is 46,142 (2020).

It was formed on 12 June 2020 via the merger of several local councils in Balakliia Raion and Chuhuiv Raion in Kharkiv Oblast. The first elections took place on 25 October 2020.

== Composition ==
The hromada contains 37 settlements: 1 city (Balakliia), 1 rural settlement (Slobozhanske), and 35 villages:

- Asiivka
- Bairak
- Berestianky
- Borshchivka
- Bryhadyrivka
- Chepil
- Husarivka
- Kalynivka
- Kreidianka
- Krynychne
- Lozovenka
- Milova
- Nova Husarivka
- Nova Serpukhivka
- Novomykolaivka
- Petrivske
- Popivka
- Protopopivka
- Shchurivka
- Shevelivka
- Siverske
- Sokolivka
- Stepok
- Taranushyne
- Uspenske
- Verbivka
- Vilne
- Vitrivka
- Volobuivka
- Volokhiv Yar
- Volvenkove
- Vovchyi Yar
- Yakovenkove
- Yanokhine
- Zavhorodnie

== Geography ==
The territory of the Balakliya hromada is located in the west of the Izyum district of the Kharkiv region. The distance to the administrative center of the city of Kharkiv from the Balakliya station by rail is 84 km, by road - 101 km.

The Siverskyi Donets River (Don basin) and its tributaries flow through the Balakliya hromada. The rivers flowing through the hromada are flat, the floodplains are marshy and have oxbow lake.

The climate of the hromada is temperate continental with cold winters and hot summers. The average annual temperature is +8.7 °C (in January -4.5, in July +22). The average annual rainfall is 520 mm. The highest rainfall occurs in the summer. There are large forest areas (pine and deciduous trees) on the territory of the hromada. The soils of the community are chernozems and meadow soils.

The territory of the community is crossed by a railway and national highways P-78 (Kharkiv - Zmiiv - Balakliya - Gorokhovatka), and E-40, which runs from Izyum to Chuguiv.
