= Borova Raion =

Former subdivision of Kharkiv Oblast, Ukraine

Borova Raion Борівський район
- Raion
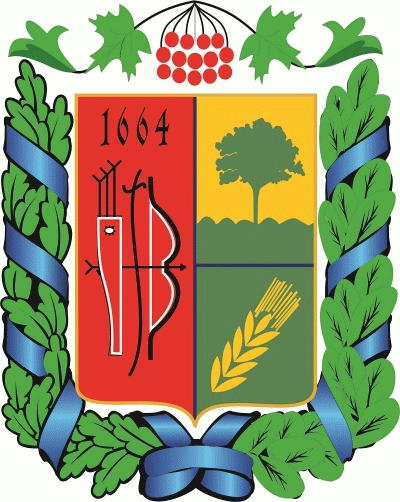
- Flag Coat of arms

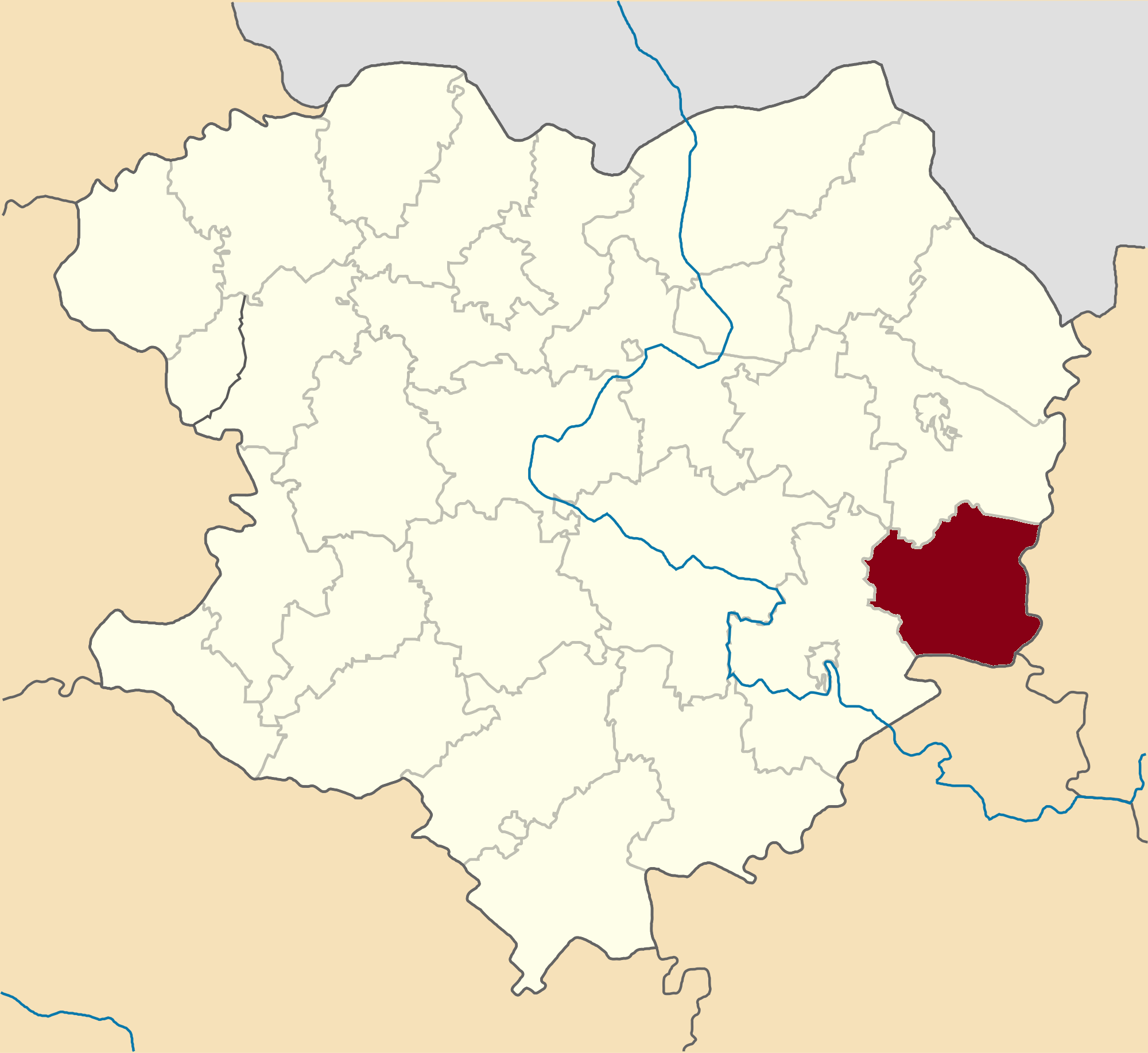
- Raion location in Kharkiv Oblast
- Coordinates: 49°21′10.9542″N 37°41′5.19″E
- Country: Ukraine
- Oblast: Kharkiv Oblast
- Disestablished: 18 July 2020
- Admin. center: Borova

Area
  - Total: 875.3 km^{2} (338.0 sq mi)

Population (2020)
  - Total: 15,972
  - Density: 18.25/km^{2} (47.26/sq mi)
- Time zone: UTC+2 (EET)
  - Summer (DST): UTC+3 (EEST)

Borova Raion (Ukrainian: Борівський район) was a raion (district) in Kharkiv Oblast of Ukraine. Its administrative center was the urban-type settlement of Borova. The raion was abolished on 18 July 2020 as part of the administrative reform of Ukraine, which reduced the number of raions of Kharkiv Oblast to seven. The area of Borova Raion was merged into Izium Raion. The last estimate of the raion population was 15,972 (2020 est.)

== Subdivisions ==
At the time of disestablishment, the raion consisted of one hromada, Borova settlement hromada with the administration in Borova.

== Geography ==
The main rivers of the raion were the Oskil River and 8 more rivers. Borova Raion bordered with Kupiansk Raion in the north, with Svatove and Kreminna Raions of Luhansk Oblast in the east, Lyman Raion, Donetsk Oblast in the south, and Izium Raion in the west.

=== Localities ===
- Zelenyi Hai
