= Russian torture chambers in Ukraine =

Torture chambers used by Russian troops

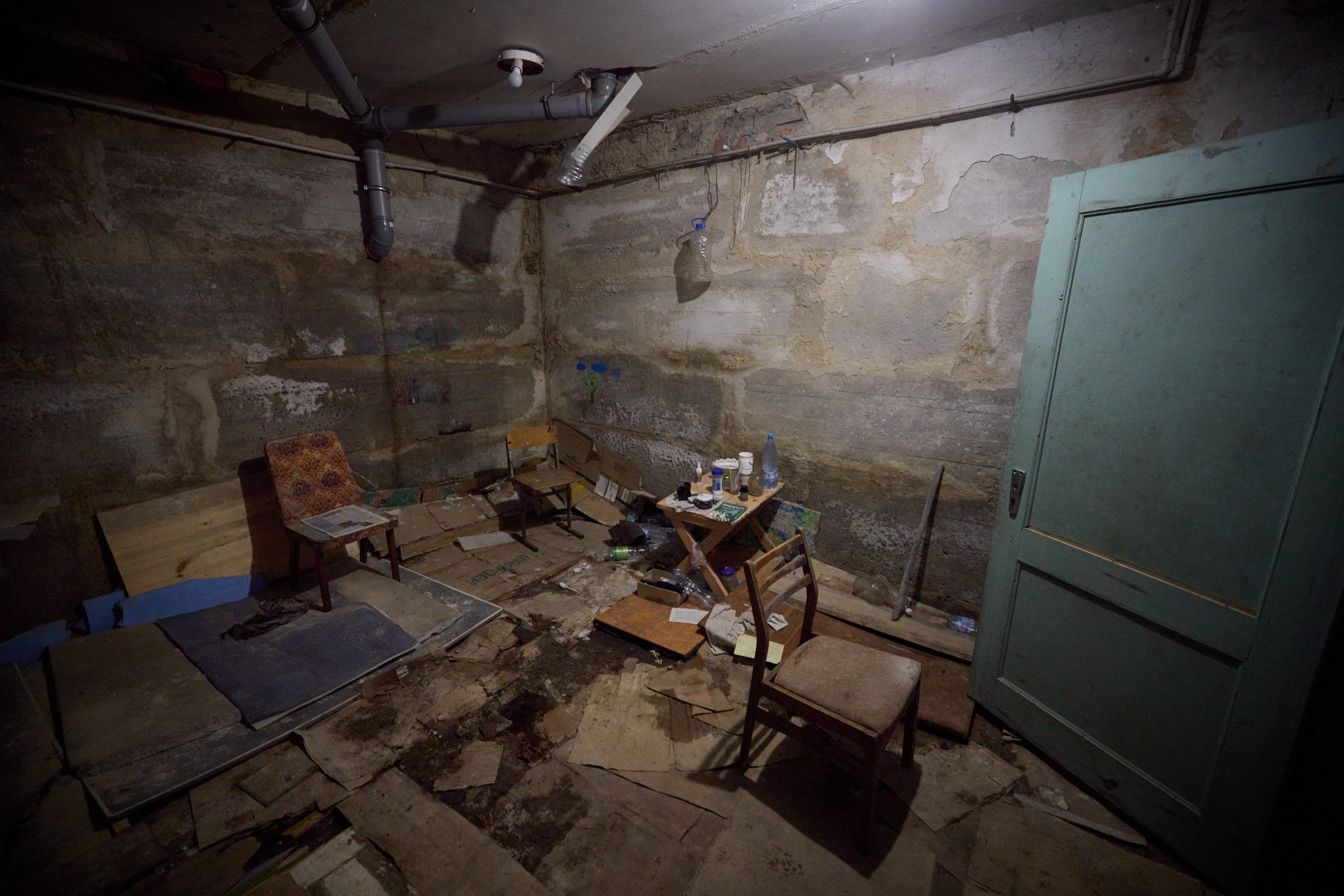
One of the torture chambers in the village of Yahidne in Chernihiv Oblast, which was under Russian occupation

After the successful 2022 Ukrainian Kharkiv counteroffensive which liberated a number of settlements and villages in the Kharkiv region from Russian occupation, authorities discovered torture chambers which had been used by Russian troops during their time in control of the area.

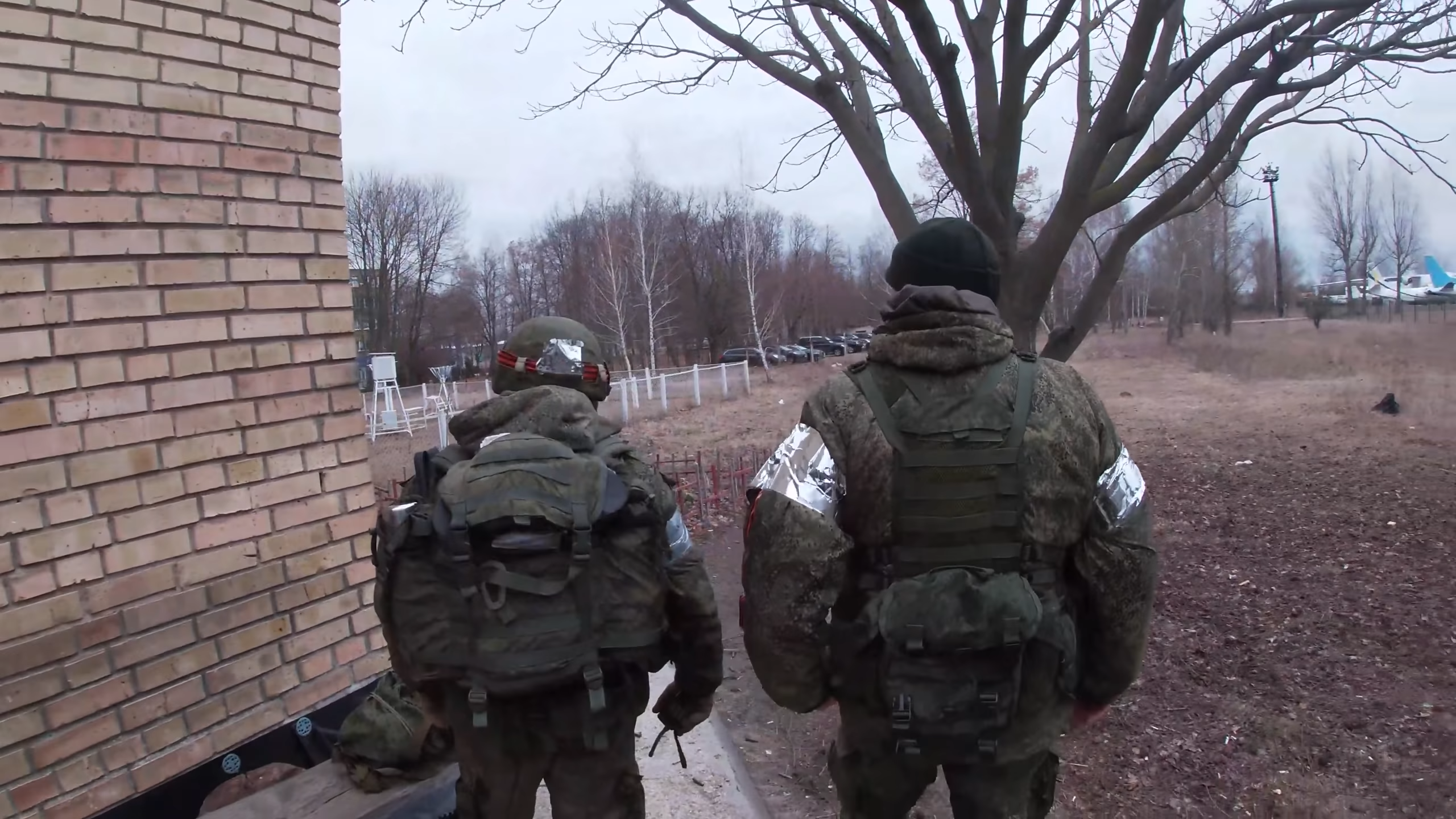
Russian troops during the March 2022 offensive

== In areas liberated in September ==
In the town of Balakliya, which the Russians occupied for six months, forensics specialists, human rights activists, criminal law experts, and Ukrainian investigators found extensive evidence of war crimes and torture. During the Russian occupation, the Russian troops used a two-story building named "BalDruk" (after a former publishing company which had an office there before the war) as a prison and a torture center. The Russians also used the police station building across the street for torture. Around 40 people were held in torture chambers during the occupation and subjected to various forms of violence, including electrocution, beatings, and mutilation. One of those arrested (because he had a picture of his brother in a Ukrainian army uniform in his home) and tortured reported hearing screams through the walls. At least several Ukrainian prisoners died as a result of the torture. Aleksander Kulik, head of the information department of the Derhachi city council, stated that several young women were subjected to gang rapes that lasted for several days.

Another Russian torture chamber was found in the liberated village of Kozacha Lopan, located at the local railway station.

In Izyum, which the Russian army occupied on 1 April 2022, and which Ukrainian forces liberated in September 2022, journalists for the Associated Press found ten torture sites. An investigation found that both Ukrainian civilians and POWs were "routinely" subject to torture. At least eight men died while under torture.

=== Rape as torture in Izyum ===
A 52-year-old woman was taken by Russian soldiers in occupied Izyum and repeatedly raped while her husband was beaten. She was arrested on 1 July along with her husband, bags were placed over their heads, and they were taken to a small shed which served as a torture room in Izyum. Russian interrogators told her they would "beat the 'Ukrainian' out of (her)" and that her body would never be found. They forcibly undressed her, groped her, and told her they would send photos to her family. The woman was raped repeatedly by the commander of the unit over three days, while other Russian soldiers beat her husband in a nearby garage. The rapist would then describe raping her to her husband. She tried to hang herself, but survived. The Russian soldiers began torturing her with electric shocks to her feet, while laughing at her pain. The Russian commander obtained the woman's bank number and stole funds from her account. The woman and her husband were released on 10 July, dumped blindfolded by the Russians at a nearby gas station. They made their way through several counties to a part of Ukraine that was not occupied by Russians, and when Izyum was liberated in September, returned home.

== Torture chambers in other areas ==
In July 2022, The Guardian reported on torture chambers in the Russian-occupied Zaporizhzhia region based on the testimony of a 16-year-old boy who was held in one of them beginning in April. The boy was arrested by Russian soldiers while trying to leave the occupied city of Melitopol because he had a video on his phone from social media, which featured Russian soldiers expressing defeatist attitudes towards Russia's invasion. He was held in a makeshift prison in Vasylivka. According to his testimony, he saw rooms where torture took place, as well as bloodstains and soaked bandages, and heard the screams of the people being tortured. The torture involved electric shocks and beating and could last for several hours.

A Russian makeshift prison that functioned as an FSB torture chamber was discovered in the liberated Kherson city, too. Ukrainian authorities estimated the number of people who had been imprisoned there at some point to be in the thousands. Among other instruments of torture, FSB officials used electric shocks against the victims.

== Torture chambers for children ==
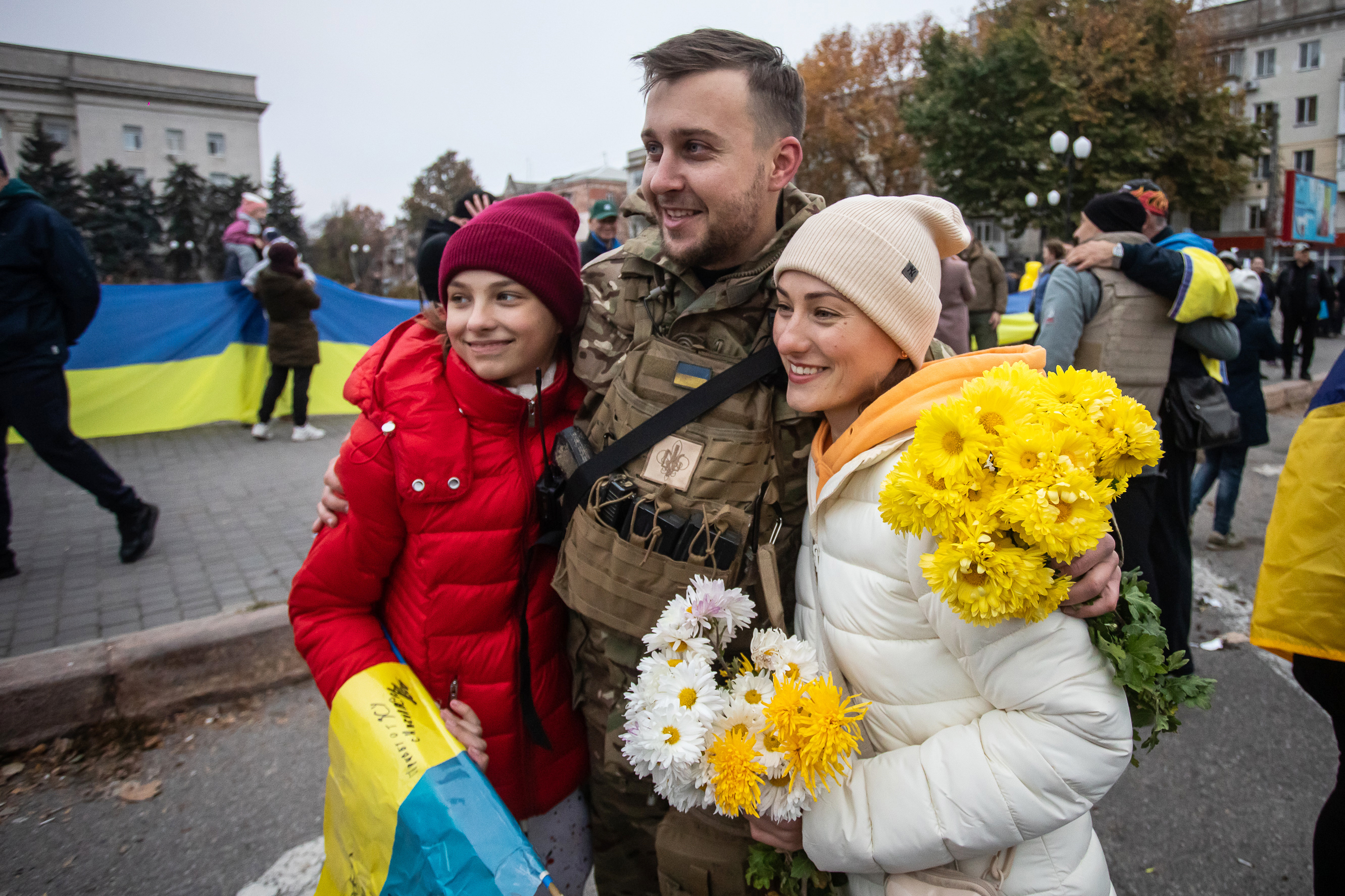
Kherson citizens celebrate the city's liberation at the end of 2022.

After the liberation of Kherson by Ukrainian forces from Russian occupation Ukrainian investigators discovered Russian torture chambers established especially for children. According to testimony, children were denied food and given water only every other day, were told their parents had abandoned them and forced to clean up the blood spilled by torture in the adjacent torture cells for adults.

Overall Ukrainian authorities uncovered ten torture chambers in Kherson region, four of them in the city itself.

In the Kharkiv region, which was liberated during the 2022 Ukrainian eastern counteroffensive authorities also found evidence of child torture, including two in the town of Balakliya. One of the children who had been held in the torture chamber described being cut with a knife, burnt with heated metal and subjected to mock executions.

== Analysis and reactions ==
Writing for Time Magazine, journalist Peter Pomerantsev commented on the systemic nature of the torture, speculating that the consistency of methods across different regions meant that torture was a policy of the Russian army rather than rogue soldiers acting against orders.

Ukrainian President Volodymyr Zelenskyy stated that more than ten torture chambers, along with mass graves, had been discovered in the Kharkiv areas liberated by Ukrainian troops. Zelenskyy also said: "As the occupiers fled they also dropped the torture devices". Kharkiv Regional Prosecutor's Office stated that "Representatives of the Russian Federation created a pseudo-law enforcement agency, in the basement of which a torture chamber was set up, where civilians were subjected to inhumane torture."

Ukrainian prosecutors have opened investigations into Russia's use of torture chambers.

== See also ==
- Izolyatsia prison
- Rusich Group
- Russian world
