= Bairak, Izium Raion =

Village in Kharkiv Oblast, Ukraine

Bairak Байрак
- Village
- Interactive map of Bairak
- Bairak in Kharkiv Oblast Bairak (Ukraine)
- Coordinates: 49.412685°N 36.837134°E
- Country: Ukraine
- Oblast: Kharkiv Oblast
- Raion: Izium Raion
- Hromada: Balakliia urban hromada
- Founded: 1729

Area
  - Total: 0.38 km^{2} (0.15 sq mi)
- Elevation: 101 m (331 ft)

Population (2001 census)
  - Total: 205
  - Density: 540/km^{2} (1,400/sq mi)
- Time zone: UTC+2 (EET)
  - Summer (DST): UTC+3 (EEST)
- Postal code: 64265
- Area code: +380 5749

Bairak (Ukrainian: Байрак; Russian: Байрак) is a village in Izium Raion (district) in Kharkiv Oblast of eastern Ukraine, at about 69.9 kilometres (43.4 mi) south-east from the centre of Kharkiv city, on the right bank of the Siverskyi Donets river.

== Etymology ==
The word Bairak comes from bayrak, which means a ravine overgrown with grass.

== History ==
On 12 June 2020, in accordance with an order from the Cabinet of Ministers of Ukraine, the territory became part of the Balakliia urban hromada in the Balakliia Raion. On 19 June 2020, the raion it was in was liquidated and it became part of the Izium Raion while retaining its previous hromada.

Since the 2020s, on the T-21-10 highway off near Bairak, there is the construction of a bridge that is set to be around 200 meters long to connect the area. The village came under attack by Russian forces in 2022, during the Russian invasion of Ukraine, and the village was occupied from the early onslaught of the invasion until September 2022. Russian forces presumably left the area in late August 2022 during the 2022 Kharkiv counteroffensive after blowing up the bridges connecting Bairak to the area via the Siverskyi Donets River. By early September 2022, Ukrainian forces reached the village and liberated it. After liberation, the village's main transport ways had to be rebuilt due to the destruction.
