= Husarivka, Barvinkove urban hromada =

Village in Kharkiv Oblast, Ukraine

Husarivka Гусарівка
- Village
- Interactive map of Husarivka
- Location of Husarivka within Kharkiv Oblast Husarivka (Ukraine)
- Coordinates: 48.89278°N 37.141491°E
- Country: Ukraine
- Oblast: Kharkiv Oblast
- Raion: Izium Raion
- Hromada: Barvinkove
- Founded: 1923

Area
  - Total: 1.0 km^{2} (0.39 sq mi)
- Elevation: 85 m (279 ft)

Population (2001 census)
  - Total: 575
  - Density: 580/km^{2} (1,500/sq mi)
- Time zone: UTC+2 (EET)
  - Summer (DST): UTC+3 (EEST)
- Postal code: 64782
- Area code: +380 5757

Husarivka (Ukrainian: Гусарівка) is a village in Barvinkove urban hromada, Izium Raion, Kharkiv Oblast, Ukraine. It had 575 inhabitants before the 2022 Russian invasion of Ukraine.

The village was liberated on April 4, 2022. The bodies of a number of residents who had been killed were found.
