= Husarivka, Balakliia urban hromada =

Village in Kharkiv Oblast, Ukraine

Husarivka Гусарівка
- Village
- Interactive map of Husarivka
- Location of Husarivka within Ukraine Husarivka (Ukraine)
- Coordinates: 49.355756°N 36.815718°E
- Country: Ukraine
- Oblast: Kharkiv Oblast
- Raion: Izium Raion
- Hromada: Balakliia
- Founded: 1685

Area
  - Total: 2.854 km^{2} (1.102 sq mi)
- Elevation: 89 m (292 ft)

Population (2001 census)
  - Total: 1,352
  - Density: 473.7/km^{2} (1,227/sq mi)
- Time zone: UTC+2 (EET)
  - Summer (DST): UTC+3 (EEST)
- Postal code: 64264
- Area code: +380 5749

Husarivka (Ukrainian: Гусарівка; Russian: Гусаровка) is a village in Izium Raion (district) in Kharkiv Oblast of Ukraine, at about 72.7 kilometres (45.2 mi) southeast by south from the centre of Kharkiv city. It belongs to Balakliia urban hromada, one of the hromadas of Ukraine.

The village was captured by Russian forces in early March 2022, during the Russian invasion of Ukraine, and was recaptured by Ukrainian forces around 26 March.
