= Nova Husarivka =

Village in Kharkiv Oblast, Ukraine

Nova Husarivka Нова Гусарівка
- Village
- Interactive map of Nova Husarivka
- Nova Husarivka in Kharkiv Oblast Nova Husarivka (Ukraine)
- Coordinates: 49.391155°N 36.876995°E
- Country: Ukraine
- Oblast: Kharkiv Oblast
- Raion: Izium Raion
- Hromada: Balakliia urban hromada
- Founded: 1824

Area
  - Total: 1.249 km^{2} (0.482 sq mi)
- Elevation: 130 m (430 ft)

Population (2001 census)
  - Total: 852
  - Density: 682/km^{2} (1,770/sq mi)
- Time zone: UTC+2 (EET)
  - Summer (DST): UTC+3 (EEST)
- Postal code: 64265
- Area code: +380 5749

Nova Husarivka (Ukrainian: Нова Гусарівка; Russian: Новая Гусаровка) is a village in Izium Raion (district) in Kharkiv Oblast of eastern Ukraine, at about 74.2 kilometres (46.1 mi) south-east from the centre of Kharkiv city.

The settlement came under attack by Russian forces during the Russian invasion of Ukraine in 2022.
