= Balakliia Raion =

Former subdivision of Kharkiv Oblast, Ukraine

Balakliia Raion Балаклійський район
- Raion
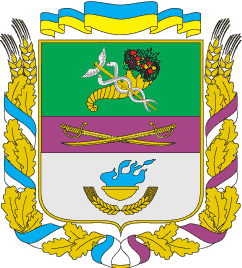
- Flag Coat of arms

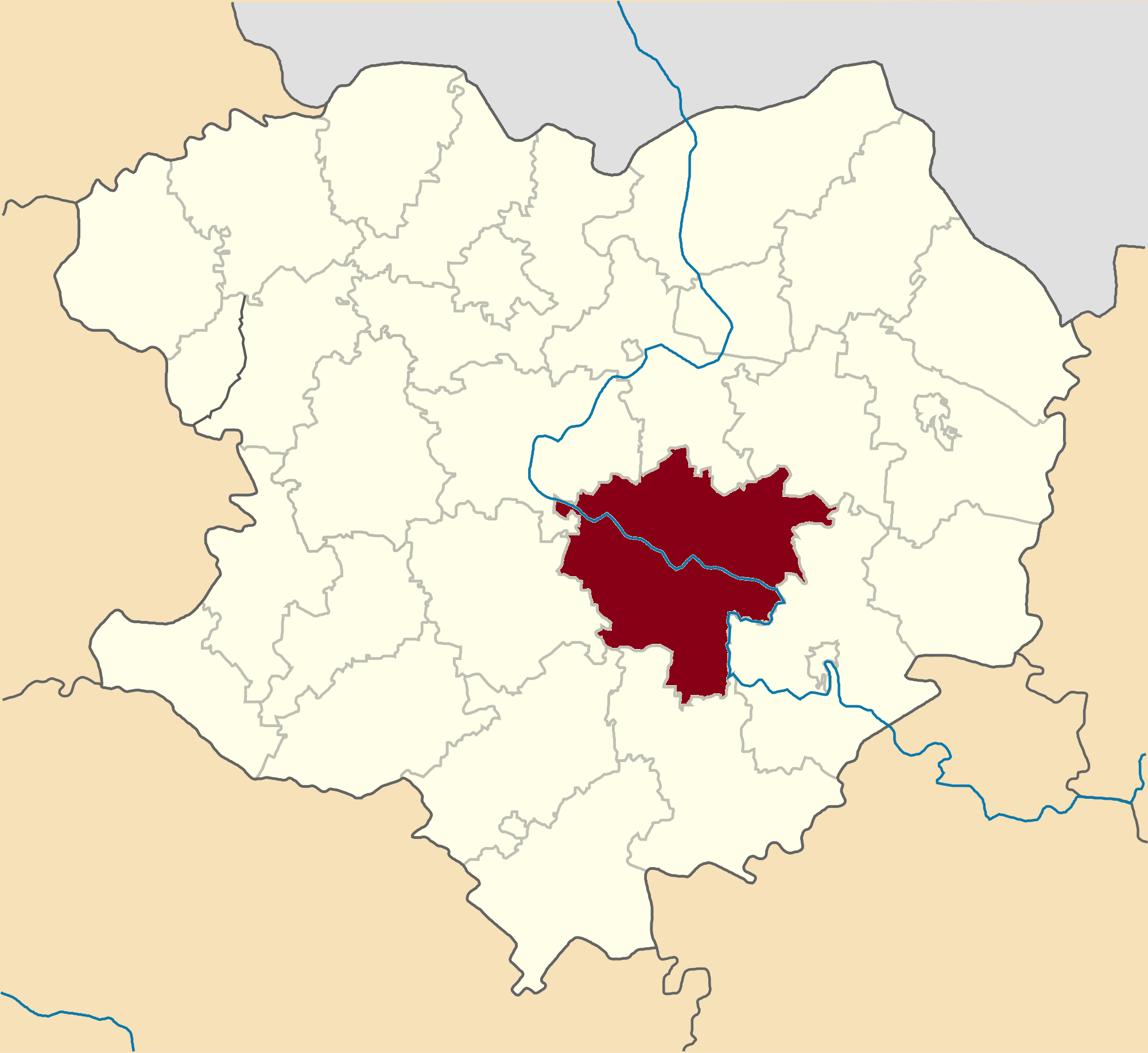
- Raion location in Kharkiv Oblast
- Coordinates: 49°24′27.1476″N 36°51′17.715″E
- Country: Ukraine
- Oblast: Kharkiv Oblast
- Established: 1923
- Disestablished: 18 July 2020
- Admin. center: Balakliia

Area
  - Total: 1,986.44 km^{2} (766.97 sq mi)

Population (2020)
  - Total: 78,337
  - Density: 39.436/km^{2} (102.14/sq mi)
- Time zone: UTC+2 (EET)
  - Summer (DST): UTC+3 (EEST)
- Website: http://balakliya-rda.gov.ua/

Balakliia Raion (Ukrainian: Балаклійський район) was the largest raion (district) in Kharkiv Oblast of Ukraine. The area of the raion was 1,986.4 km^{2}, corresponding to 6.3% of the total territory of Kharkiv Oblast. Its administrative center was the town of Balakliia. The raion was abolished on 18 July 2020 as part of the administrative reform of Ukraine, which reduced the number of raions of Kharkiv Oblast to seven. The area of Balakliia Raion was merged into Izium Raion. The last estimate of the raion population was 78,337 (2020 est.)

At the time of disestablishment, the raion consisted of three hromadas:

- Balakliia urban hromada with the administration in Balakliia;
- Donets settlement hromada with the administration in the urban-type settlement of Donets;
- Savyntsi settlement hromada with the administration in the urban-type settlement of Savyntsi.
