= Balakliia =

City in Kharkiv Oblast, Ukraine

Balakliia Балаклія
- City
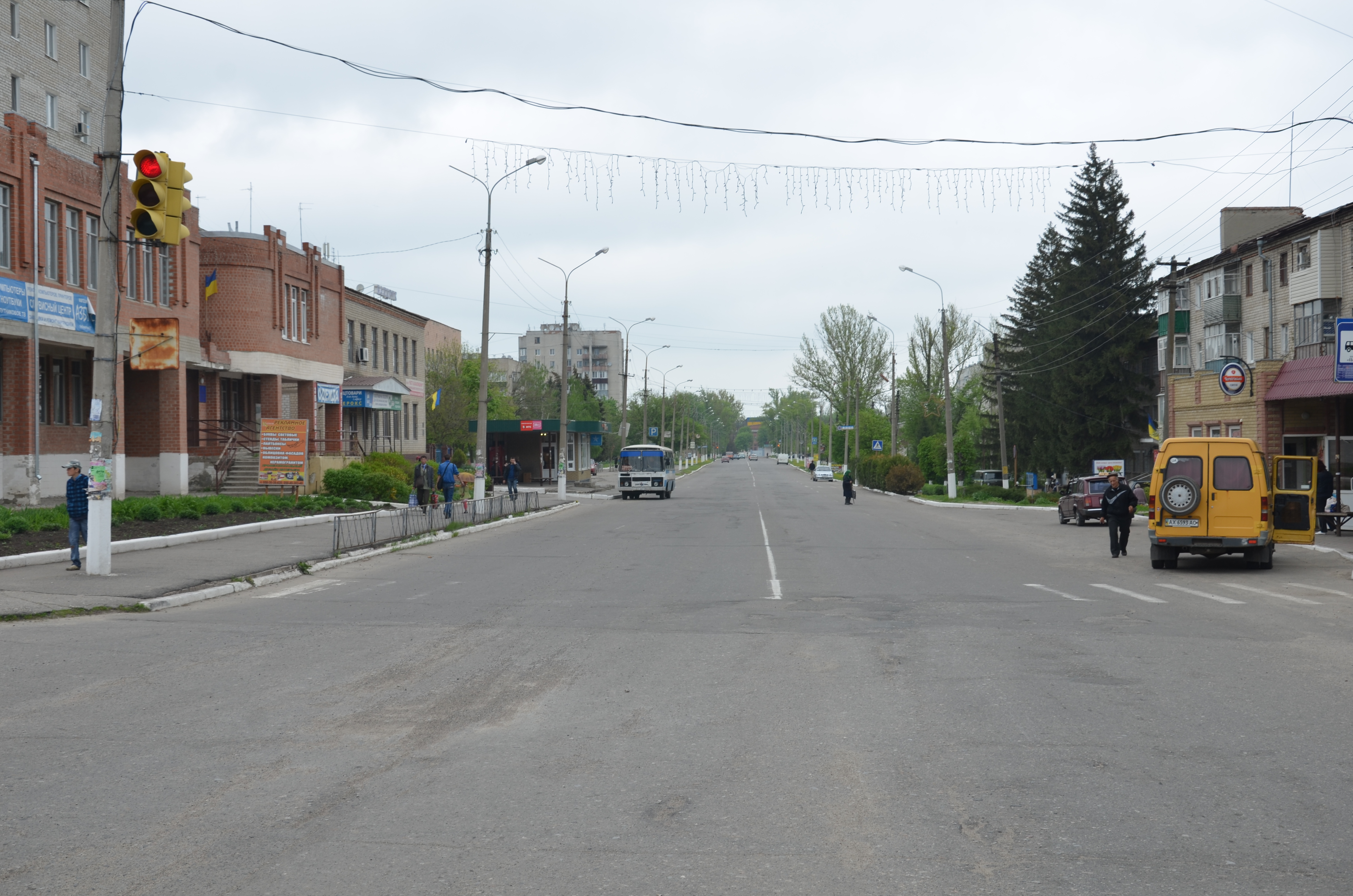
- Zhovtneva street, the main street of Balakliia

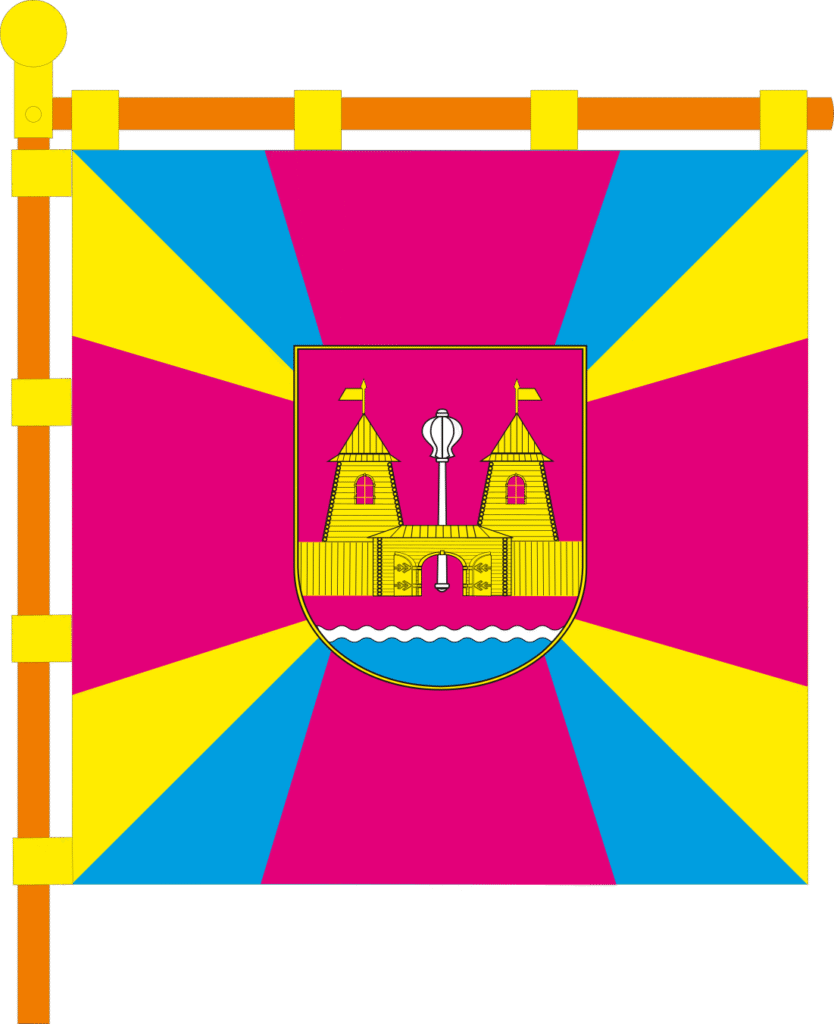
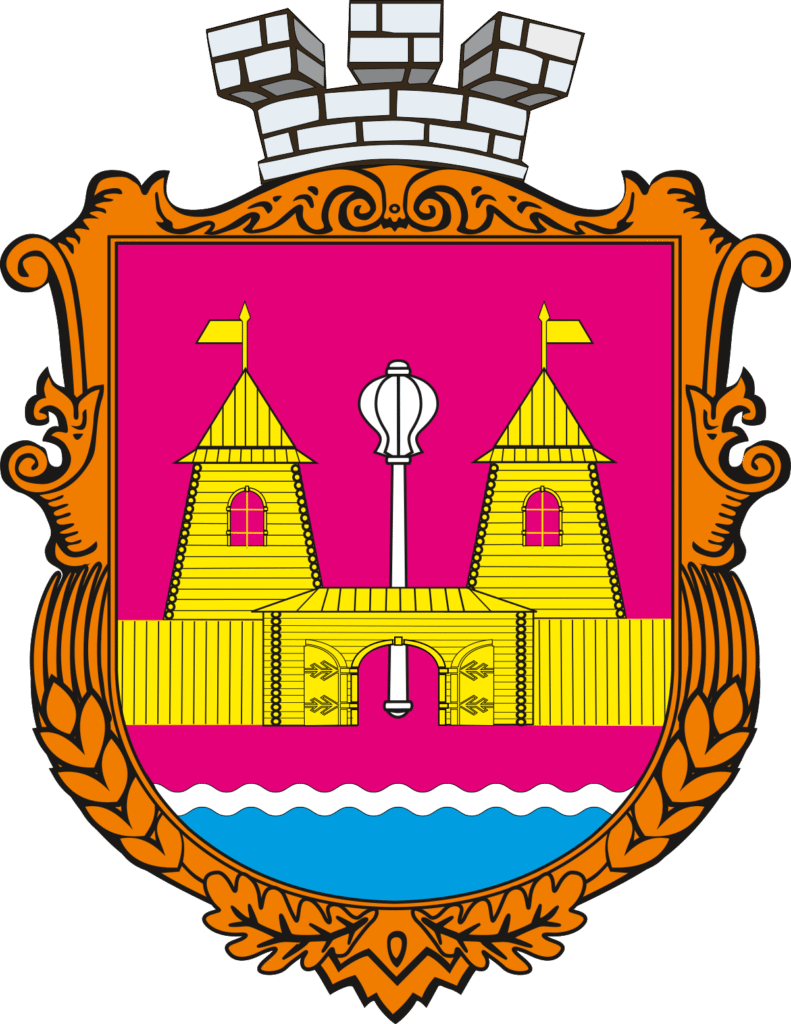
- Flag Coat of arms
- Interactive map of Balakliia
- Location of Balakliia Balakliia (Ukraine)
- Coordinates: 49°27′57″N 36°52′04″E
- Country: Ukraine
- Oblast: Kharkiv Oblast
- Raion: Izium Raion
- Hromada: Balakliia urban hromada
- Founded: 1663

Area
  - Total: 35 km^{2} (14 sq mi)
- Elevation: 79 m (259 ft)

Population (2022)
  - Total: 26,334
- Time zone: UTC+2 (EET)
  - Summer (DST): UTC+3 (EEST)
- Postal code: 64200

Balakliia or Balakliya (Ukrainian: Балаклія, IPA: [bɐlɐˈkl⁽ʲ⁾ijɐ]; Russian: Балаклея, romanized: Balakleya) is a city in the Izium Raion, Kharkiv Oblast, eastern Ukraine, on the northeast side of the Siverskyi Donets river close to where it is joined by the Balakliika river, which runs through the town. It is an important railroad junction in the oblast. Balakliia hosts the administration of Balakliia urban hromada, one of the hromadas of Ukraine. Population: 26,334 (2022 estimate).

== Administrative status ==
Until 18 July 2020, Balakliia was the administrative center of Balakliia Raion. The raion was abolished in July 2020 as part of the administrative reform of Ukraine, which reduced the number of raions of Kharkiv Oblast to seven. The area of Balakliia Raion was merged into Izium Raion.

== History ==
=== Early history and etymology ===
The land that is now Balakliia has been inhabited since ancient times. Settlements from the Neolithic Age and Bronze Age have been preserved.

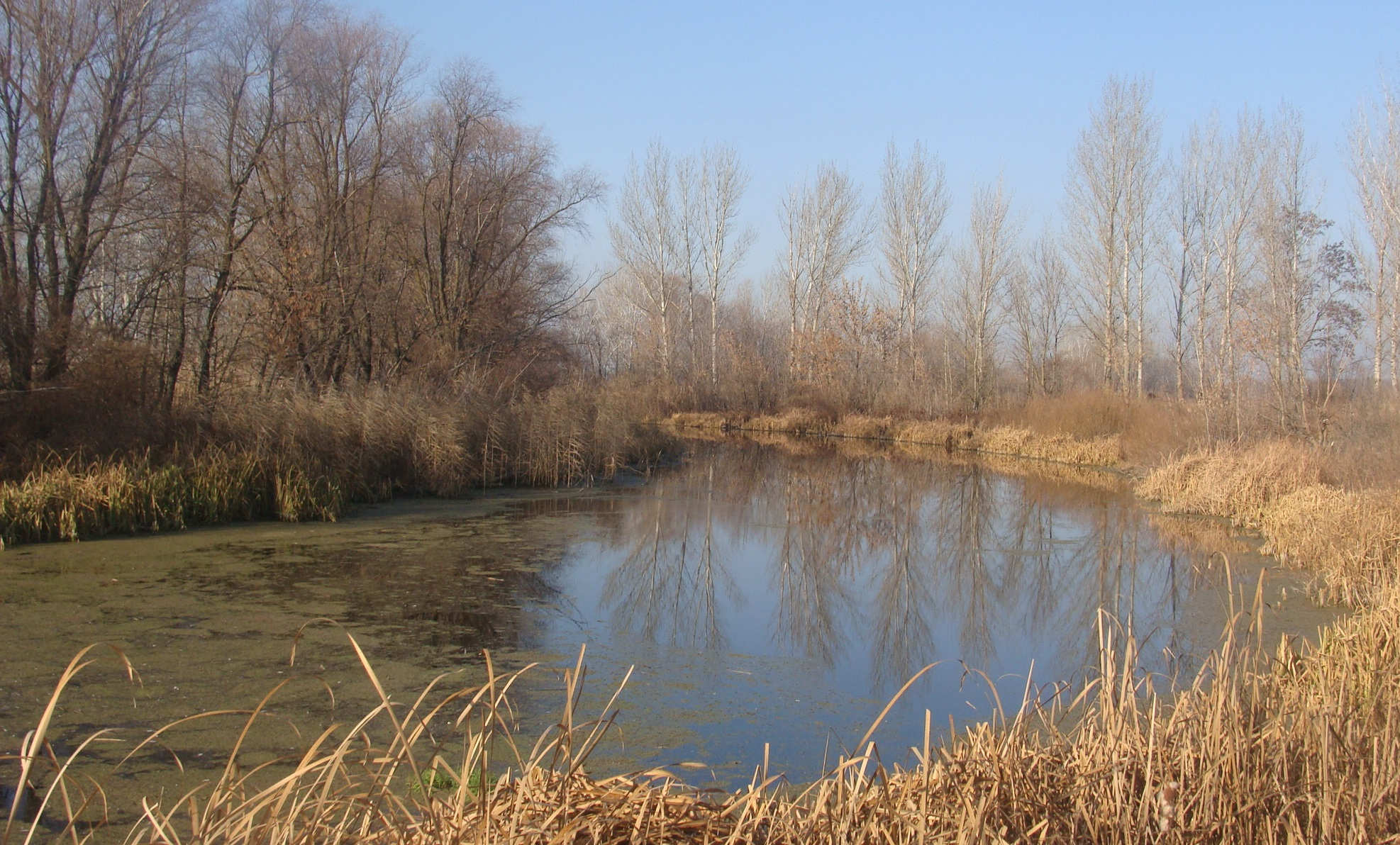
The Balakliika River is the basis for the town's name.

The name "Balakliia" is derived from the Balakliia River, a tributary of the Donets. The river's name in turn comes from a Turkic word meaning 'fish river'. The Brockhaus and Efron Encyclopedic Dictionary judges from the name of the settlement that the town was originally a Tatar settlement.

=== Modern period ===
In 1571, the Moscow government established a watch service on the Seversky Donets and Oskil rivers-seven watches whose task was to report the approach of the Tatars. A third watch was built at the mouth of the Balakliika River.

The modern history of the settlement began in 1663, when it became populated by East Slavs and served as a guard post against raids from Crimean Tatars. Starting in 1669 or 1670, the settlement served as the center of the Balakliia Regiment, which existed until 1677. Residents of Balakliia took an active part in the Stenka Razin Rebellion (1676–1681), the Bulavin Rebellion (1707–1708), and Pugachev's Rebellion (1773–1775).

From 1817 to 1891, the settlement was known as Novo-Serpukhiv. (Note: Ukrainian: Ново-Серпухів; Russian: Ново-Серпухов, romanized: Novo-Serpukhov)

By the early 20th century, Balakliia had a population of 5,197. During the Ukrainian War of Independence, from 1917 to 1920, it passed between various factions. Afterwards it was administratively part of the Kharkiv Governorate of Ukraine. It received urban status in 1938. During World War II, the town was occupied by the Wehrmacht between 9 December 1941, and 5 February 1943.

=== 2017–2019 arms depot explosions ===
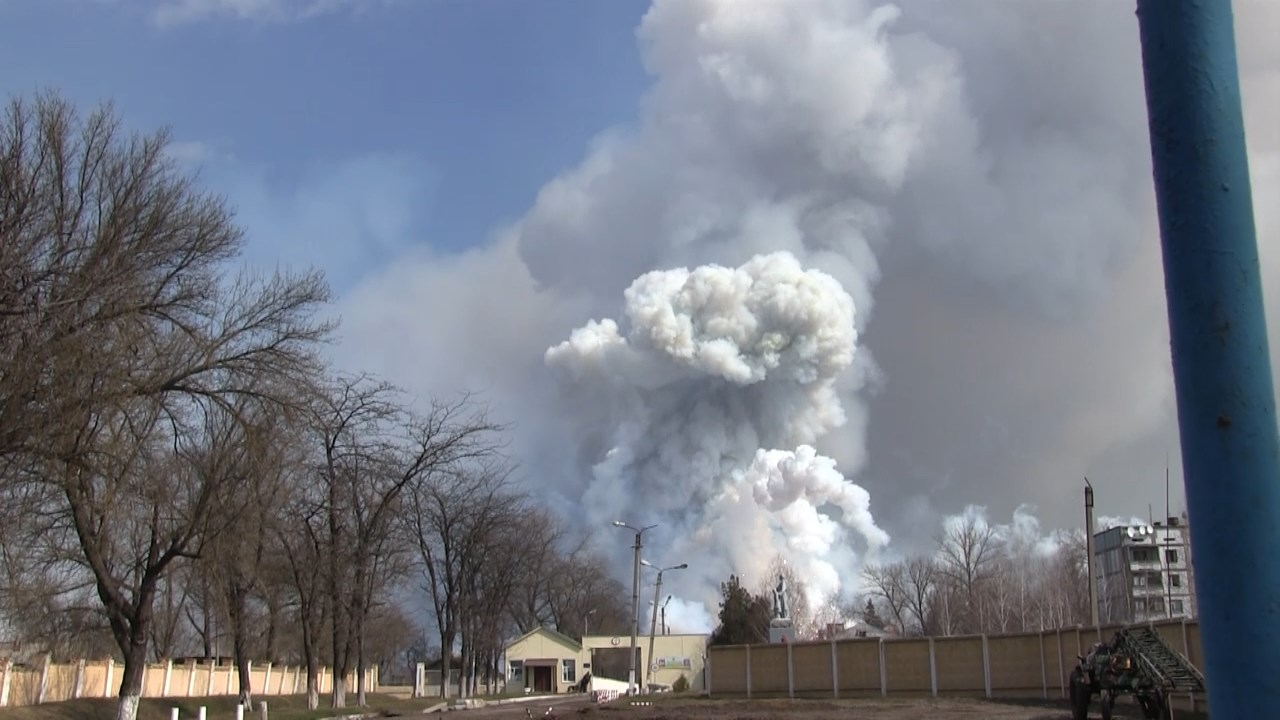
March 2017 explosions in the city

On 23 March 2017, 20,000 inhabitants of Balakliia were evacuated after a series of massive explosions erupted at a nearby arms depot of the Balakliia military installation, which stockpiles missile and artillery ammunition. The disaster led to the death of one woman civilian; five other civilians were injured. There were no casualties among the military. Thousands of residents within a 10 km radius around the complex were evacuated in the aftermath. By the end of March, the fires and resulting arms explosions at the ammunition depot in Balakliia had damaged almost 250 buildings. On 18 April, Balakliia and nearby villages were cleared of unexploded ordnance.

On 3 May 2018, there was a new series of explosions at the depot after dry grass caught fire. 1,500 locals were evacuated, and no casualties were reported. On 15 November 2019, another series of explosions killed two Ukrainian soldiers.

=== Full-scale Russian invasion of Ukraine ===
==== Russian capture and occupation ====
On 3 March 2022, during the Russian invasion of Ukraine, Russian forces captured the town. The then-Mayor Ivan Stolbovyy initially stayed in the occupied town and collaborated with the Russian occupation forces. "[I]t’s complicated," he told Balakliia residents, "It’s war." He urged the town's inhabitants not to engage in looting or "terrorist acts". On 28 March, the government of Ukraine began criminal proceedings against Stolbovyy on charges of treason and collaboration with Russia. In early April 2022, Stolbovyy fled with his family to Russia.

The senior military occupation officer in Balakliia was Colonel Ivan Popov; the commandant charged with "keeping the local civilian population in check" went under the pseudonym "V. Granit" (Granite), and oversaw at least one interrogation center where Ukrainian civilians were "beaten and questioned using electric shocks", according to Balakliia residents and Ukrainian government officials. According to a Reuters investigation published in April 2023, "Granit" was the pseudonym of Valery Sergeyevich Buslov, a lieutenant colonel in the military police.

The occupation force occupied a "run-down vehicle repair complex" on the town's outskirts and used it as their command center for the occupation. Russian soldiers distributed flyers "warning of Ukraine’s descent into Nazi rule" if the Ukrainian government regained control of the town, and "scribbled" on the walls of the military base.

==== Liberation by Ukraine ====
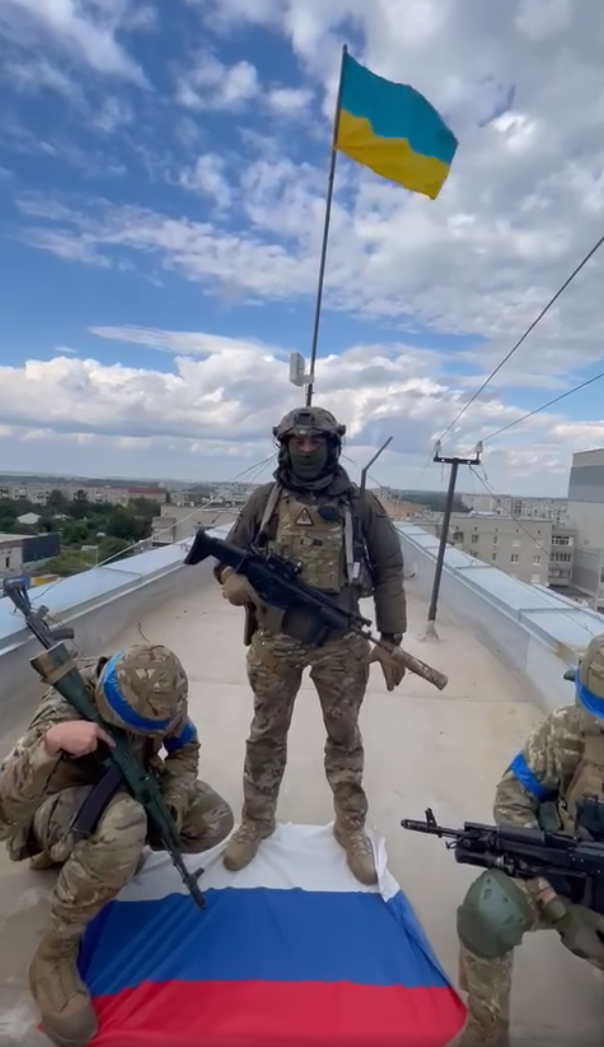
Ukrainian flag flying in liberated Balakliia on 8 September 2022

On 6 September 2022, Ukrainian forces launched a counteroffensive towards Balakliia, reportedly retaking adjacent Verbivka and besieging the town. After crossing the Donets River, men of the 71st Jaeger Brigade led an offensive on Balakliia, coming from the direction of Husarivka. On 8 September, the Ukrainian flag was raised over the town after a brief battle, and on 10 September, Ukraine announced it had established control.

After recapturing the town, Ukrainian officials said they had discovered torture chambers where Ukrainian prisoners were held. Serhiy Bolvinov, head of the Kharkiv Region National Police Investigation Department, said that 40 people had been detained there. Ukrainian President Volodymyr Zelenskyy said that more than ten similar torture chambers had been discovered in the Kharkiv Region. Investigations also began against more alleged collaborators.

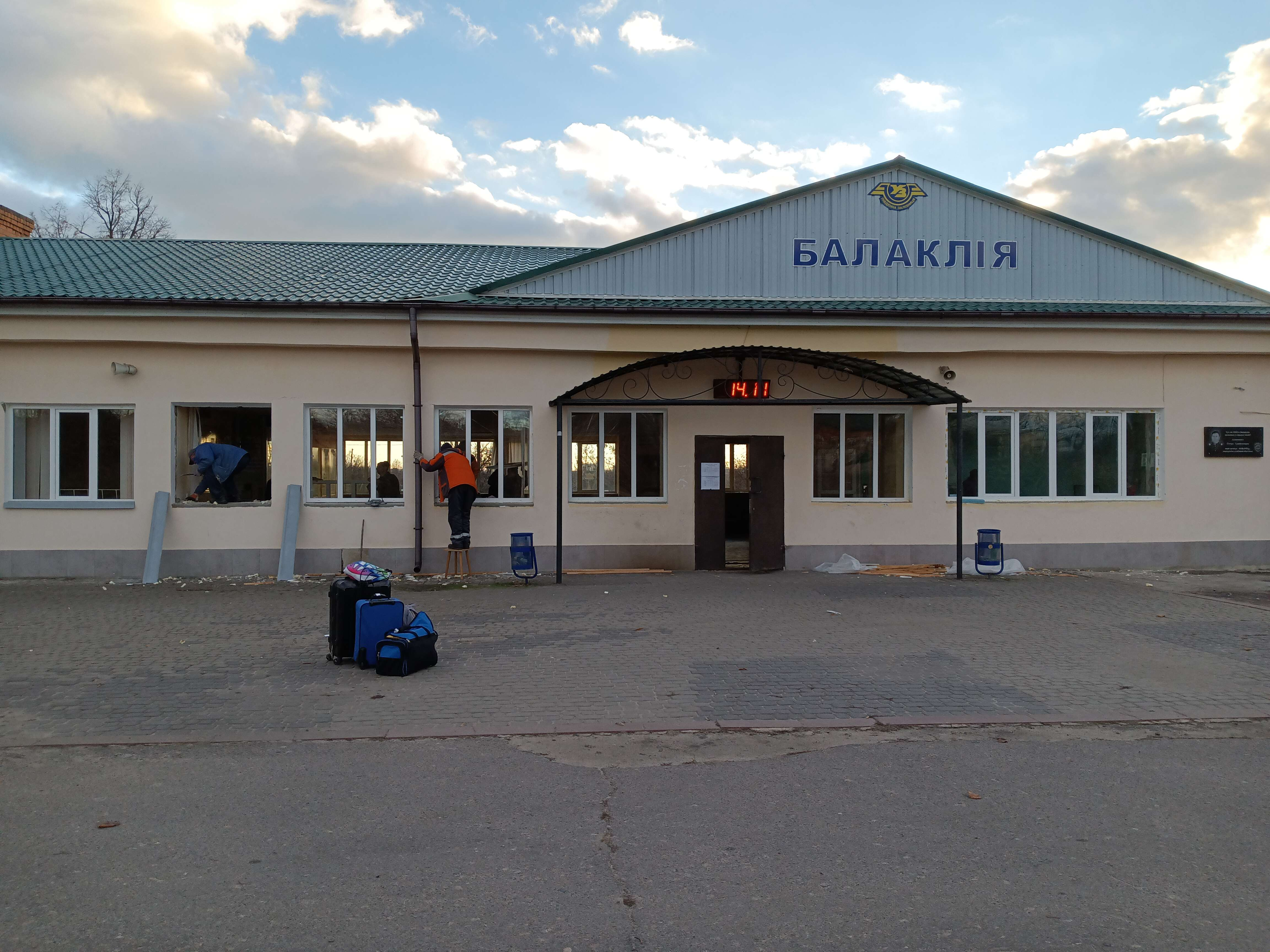
Balakliia train station under repair in November 2022 after the city's liberation

Diesel trains were running on the Kharkiv–Balakliia railway line four days after liberation. Electric power was restored to the town on 26 September 2022. On 25 November 2022, the Vinnytsia city council allocated 10 million hryvnias in funds to help rebuild Balaklia. The funds were to be used, specifically, to restore housing and improve heating services ahead of the winter.

== Demographics ==
Historical population
Year	Pop.	±% p.a.
1732	1,186	—
1906	5,197	+0.85%
1968	30,200	+2.88%
1989	35,737	+0.80%
2001	32,117	−0.89%
2013	29,499	−0.71%
2022	26,334	−1.25%

As of the 2001 Ukrainian census, Balakliia had a population of 32,117 inhabitants. The ethnic composition was as follows:

Ethnic groups in Balakliia
	percent
Ukrainians	80.44%
Russians	18.04%
Belarusians	0.42%
Azerbaijanis	0.19%
Armenians	0.17%
Romani	0.08%
Tatars	0.07%
Georgians	0.04%

== Gallery ==
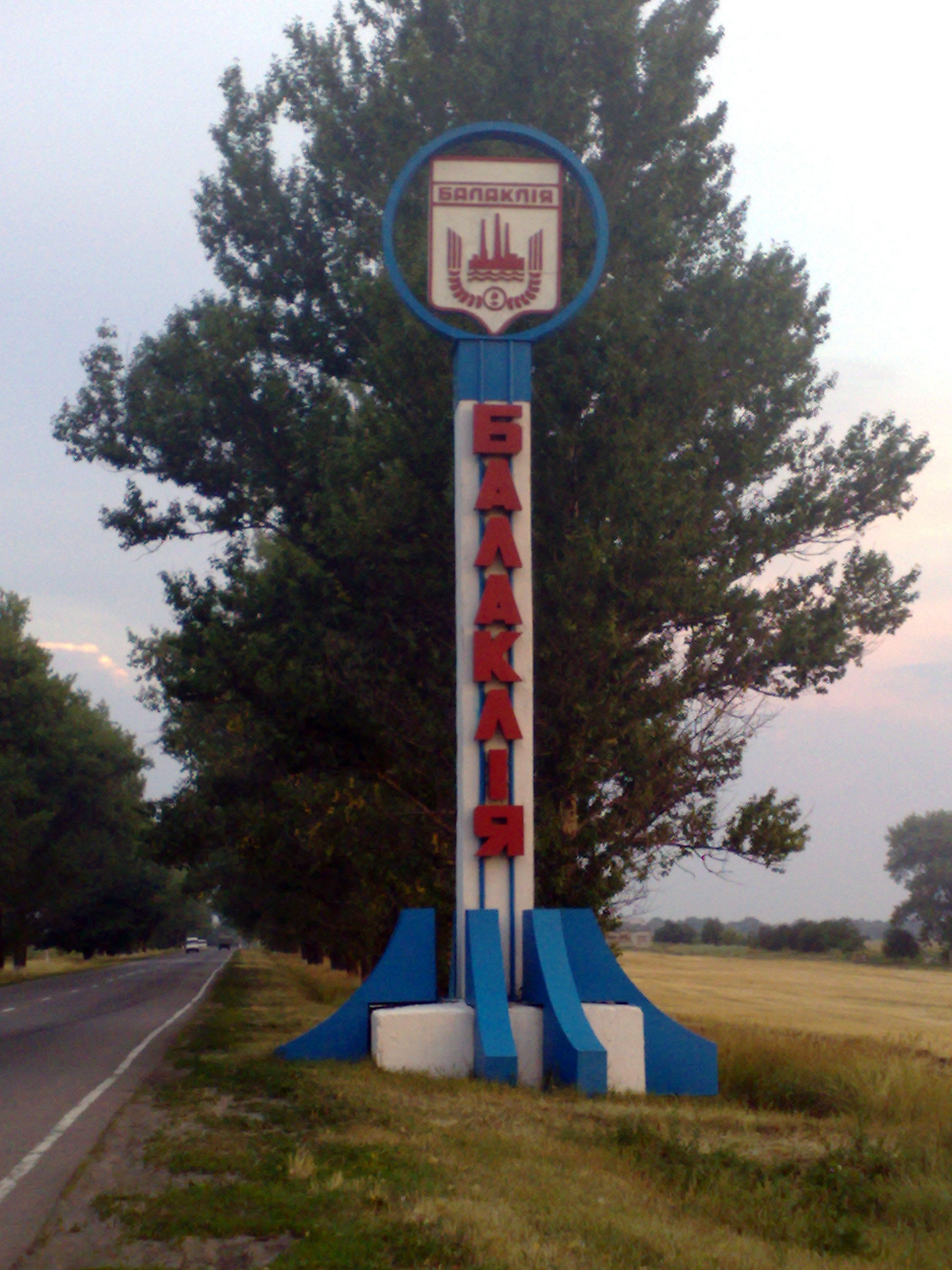
Balakliia city sign

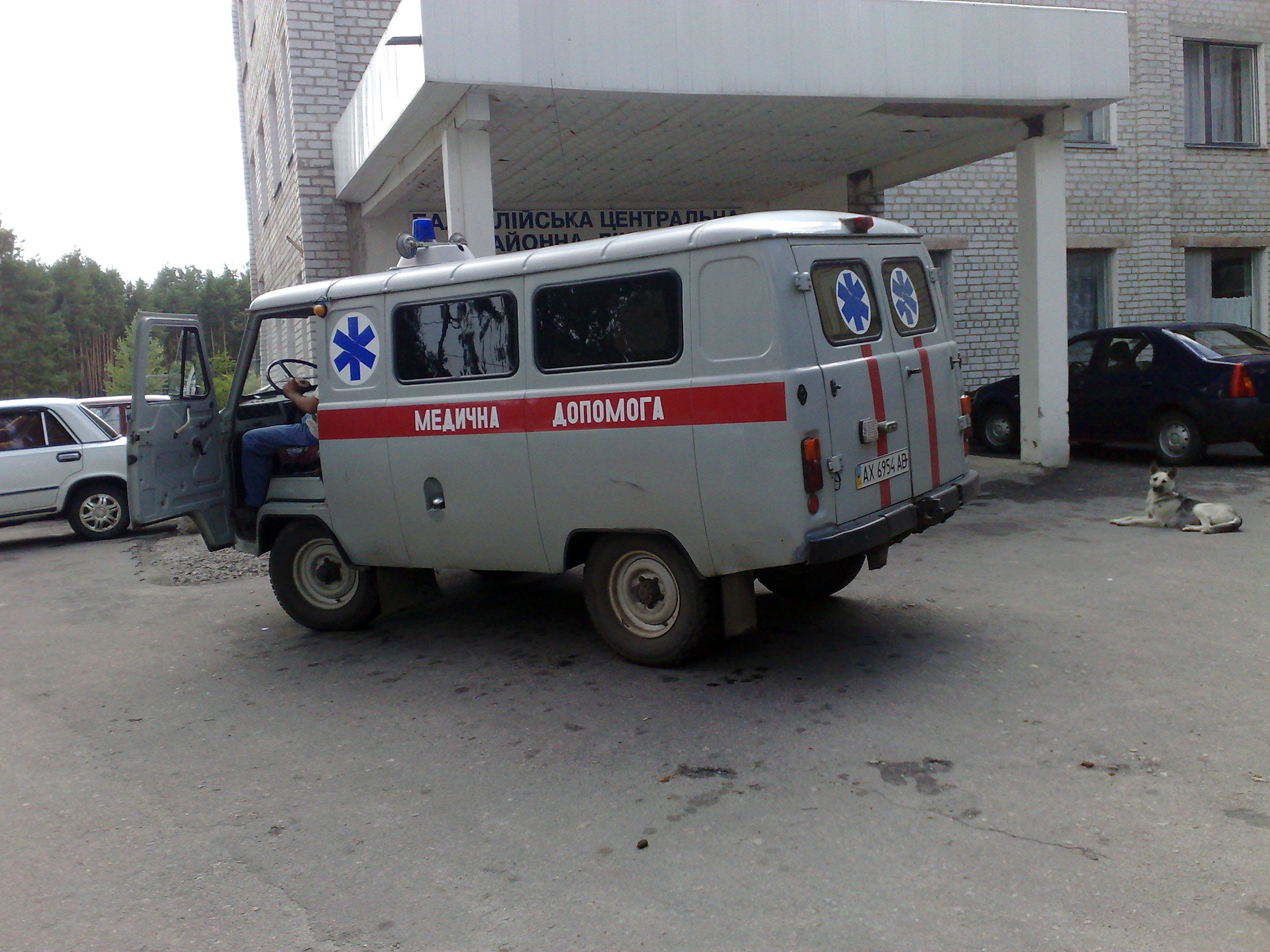
Balakliia Ambulance in front of local hospital

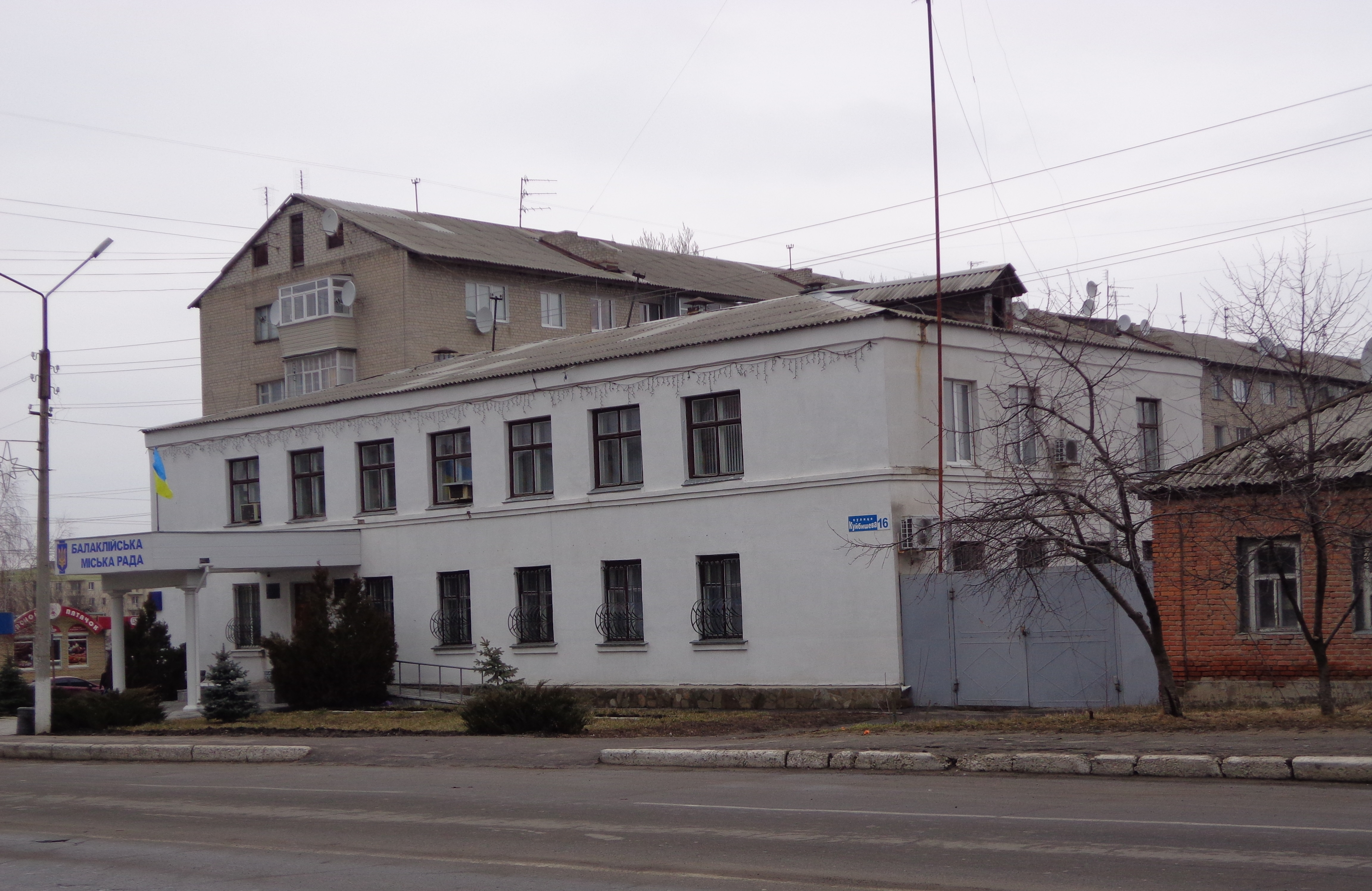
City hall

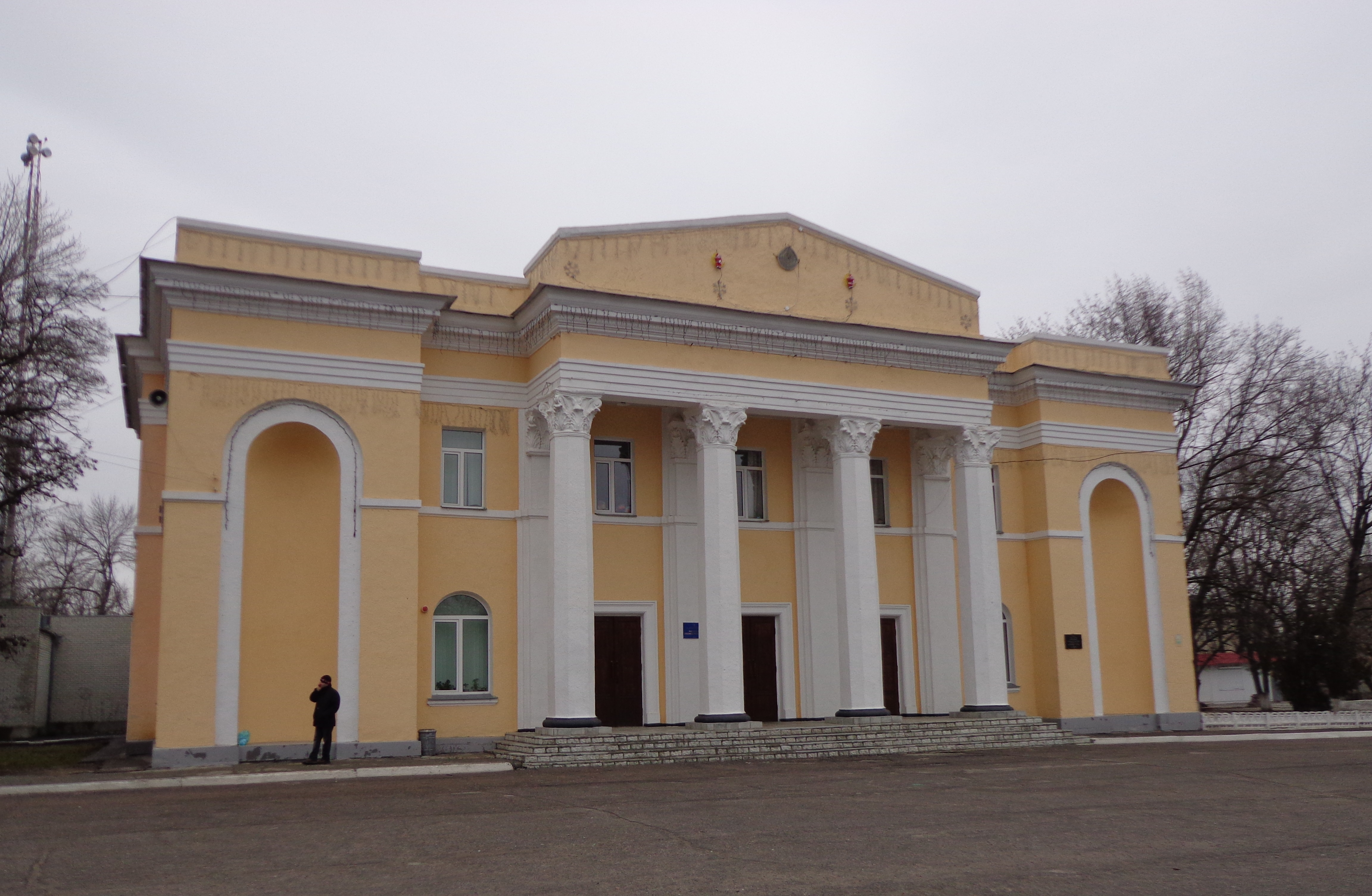
Palace of Culture

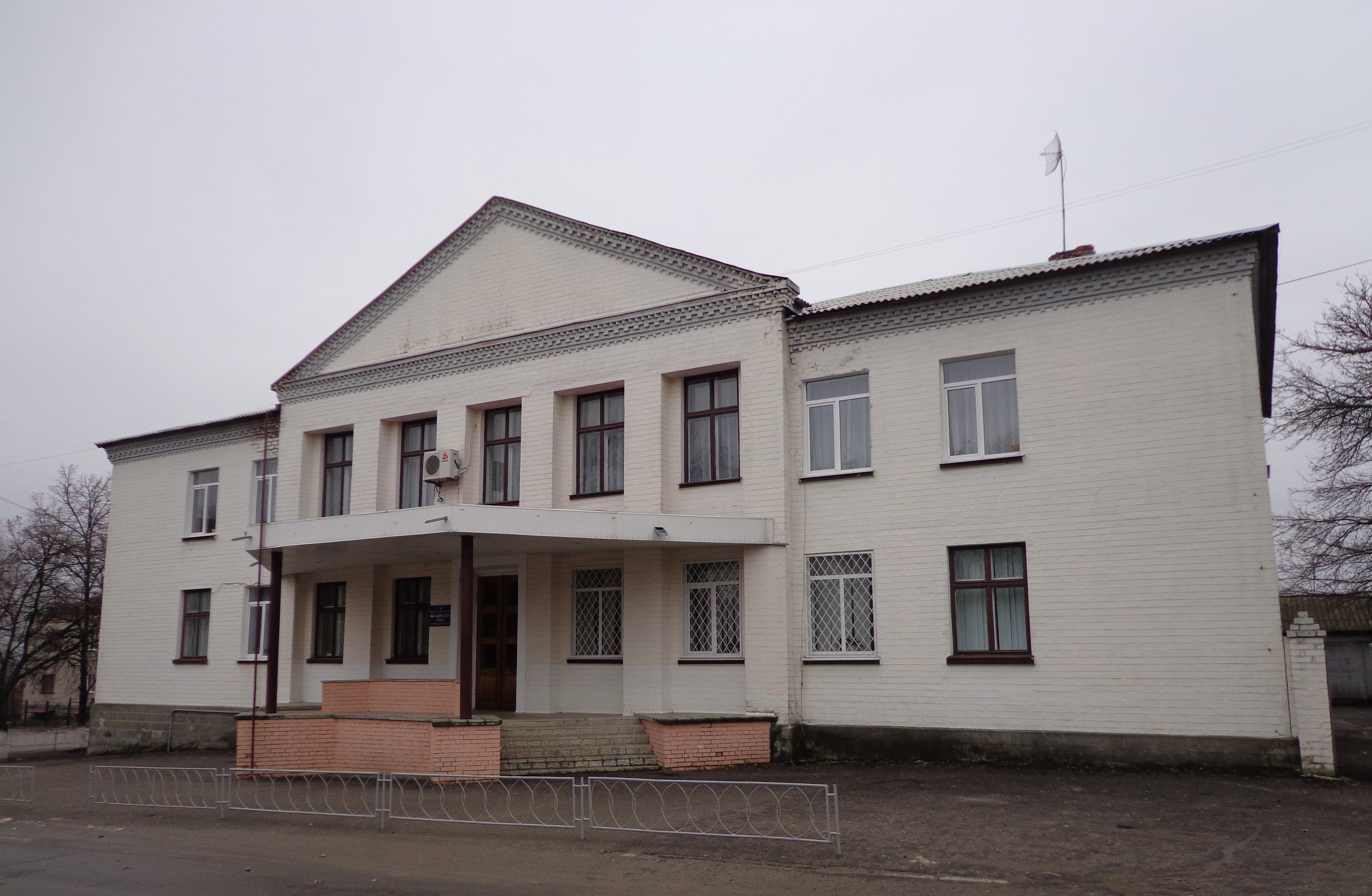
Balakliia Lyceum

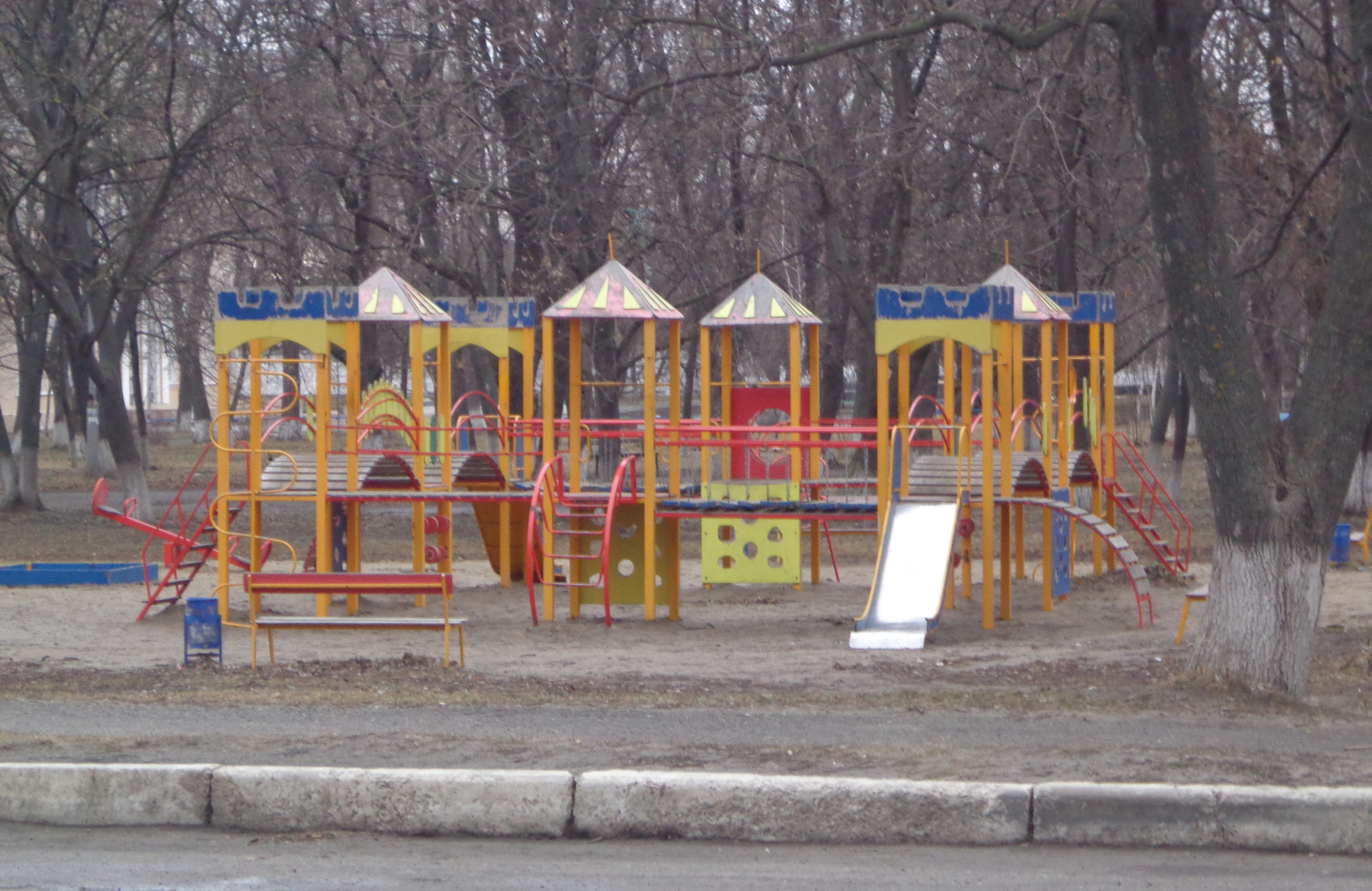
Children's playground

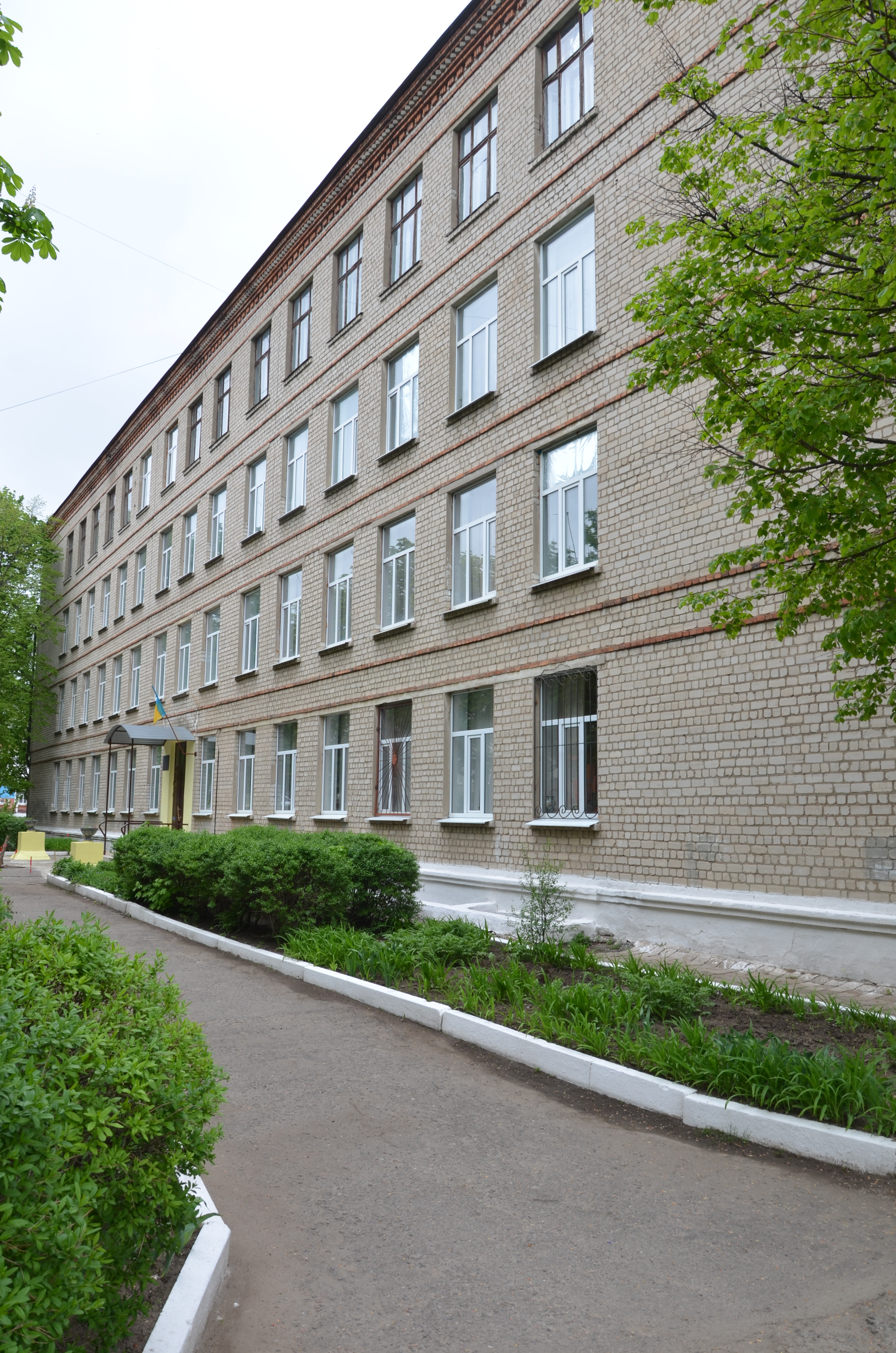
Balakliysk Primary School

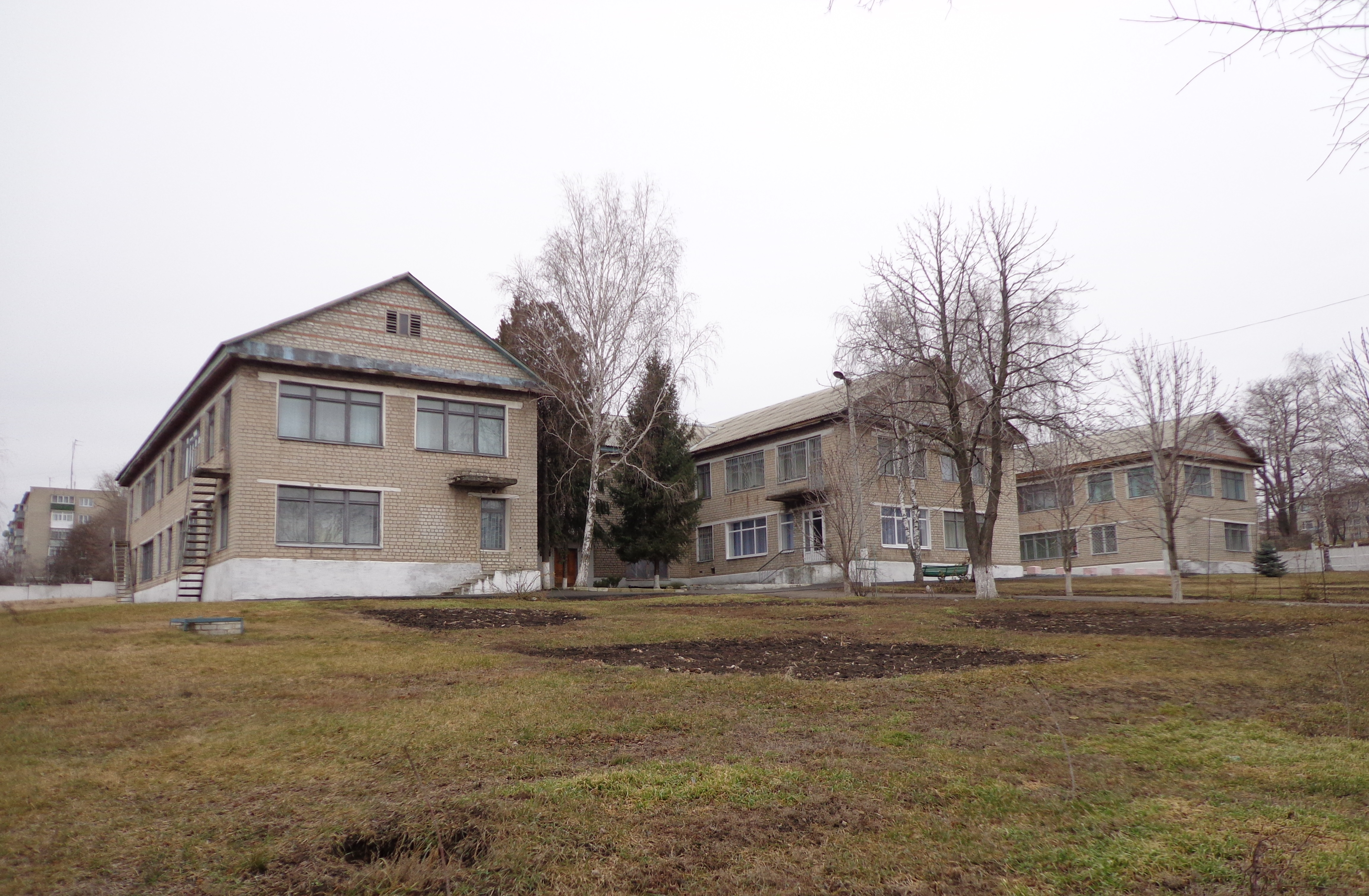
Pedagogical college

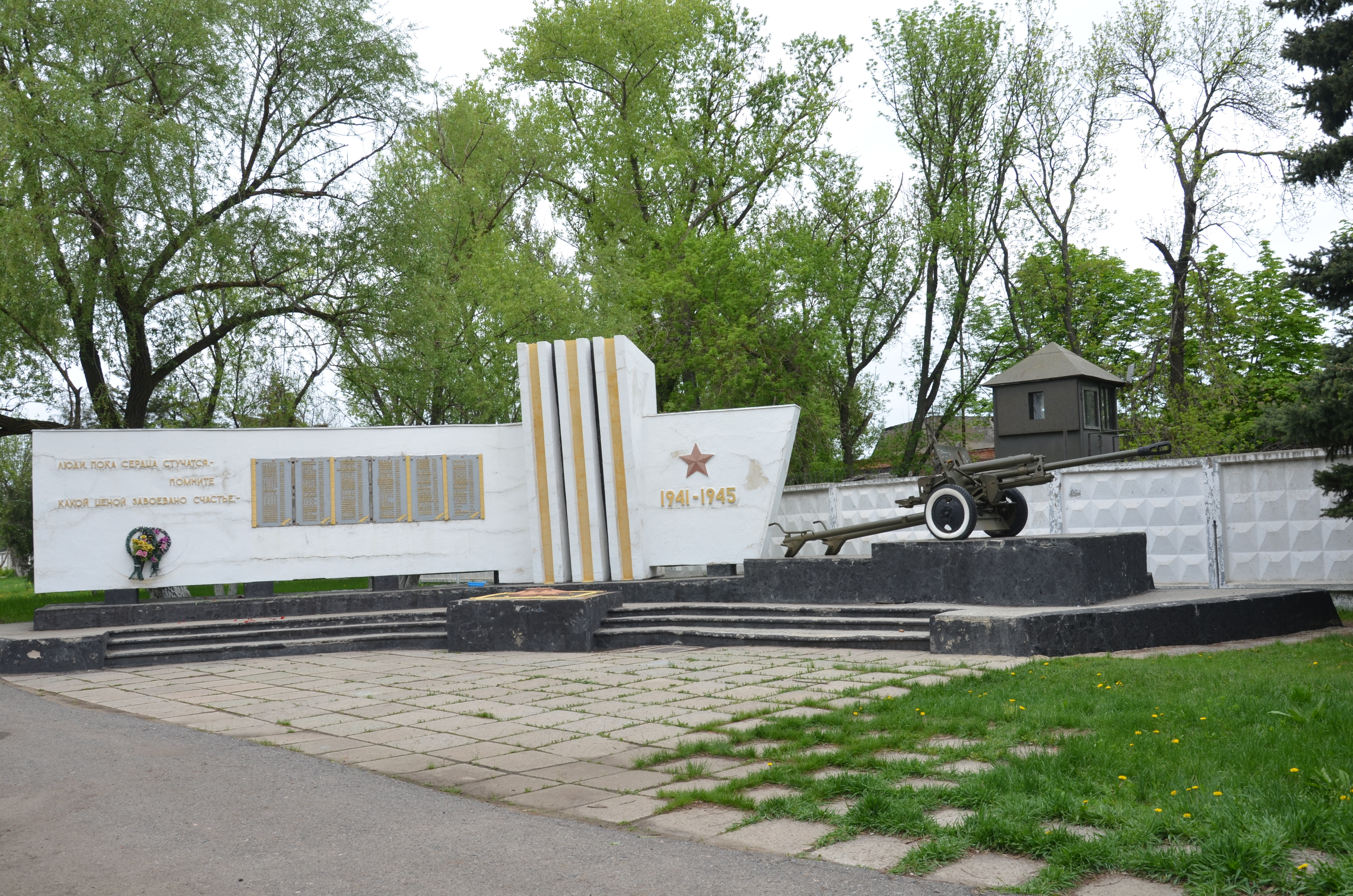
Monument to fallen soldiers in the Second World War
