= Izium Raion =

Subdivision of Kharkiv Oblast, Ukraine

Izium Raion Ізюмський район
- Raion
- Flag Coat of arms

- Raion location in Kharkiv Oblast
- Coordinates: 49°15′48.5094″N 37°16′50.34″E
- Country: Ukraine
- Oblast: Kharkiv Oblast
- Admin. center: Izium
- Subdivisions: 8 hromadas

Area
  - Total: 5,906.2 km^{2} (2,280.4 sq mi)

Population (2022)
  - Total: 172,120
  - Density: 29.142/km^{2} (75.478/sq mi)
- Time zone: UTC+2 (EET)
  - Summer (DST): UTC+3 (EEST)
- Website: http://www.izyumrda.gov.ua/

Izium Raion (Ukrainian: Ізюмський район, romanized: Iziumskyi raion) is a raion (district) in Kharkiv Oblast of Ukraine. Its administrative center is the city of Izium. Population: 172,120 (2022 estimate).

On 18 July 2020, as part of the administrative reform of Ukraine, the number of raions of Kharkiv Oblast was reduced to seven, and the area of Izium Raion was significantly expanded. Three abolished raions – Balakliia, Barvinkove, and Borova Raions – and the city of Izium, which was previously incorporated as a city of oblast significance and did not belong to the raion, were merged into Izium Raion.

The pre-reform January 2020 estimate of the raion population was 16,416 (2020 est.).

== Subdivisions ==
=== Current ===
After the reform in July 2020, the raion consisted of 8 hromadas:

- Balakliia urban hromada with the administration in the city of Balakliia, transferred from Balakliia Raion;
- Barvinkove urban hromada with the administration in the city of Barvinkove, transferred from Barvinkove Raion;
- Borova settlement hromada with the administration in the rural settlement of Borova, transferred from Borova Raion;
- Donets settlement hromada with the administration in the rural settlement of Donets, transferred from Balakliia Raion;
- Izium urban hromada with the administration in the city of Izium, transferred from the city of oblast significance of Izium;
- Kunie rural hromada with the administration in the village of Kunie, retained from Izium Raion;
- Oskil rural hromada with the administration in the village of Oskil, retained from Izium Raion;
- Savyntsi settlement hromada with the administration in the rural settlement of Savyntsi, transferred from Balakliia Raion.

=== Before 2020 ===
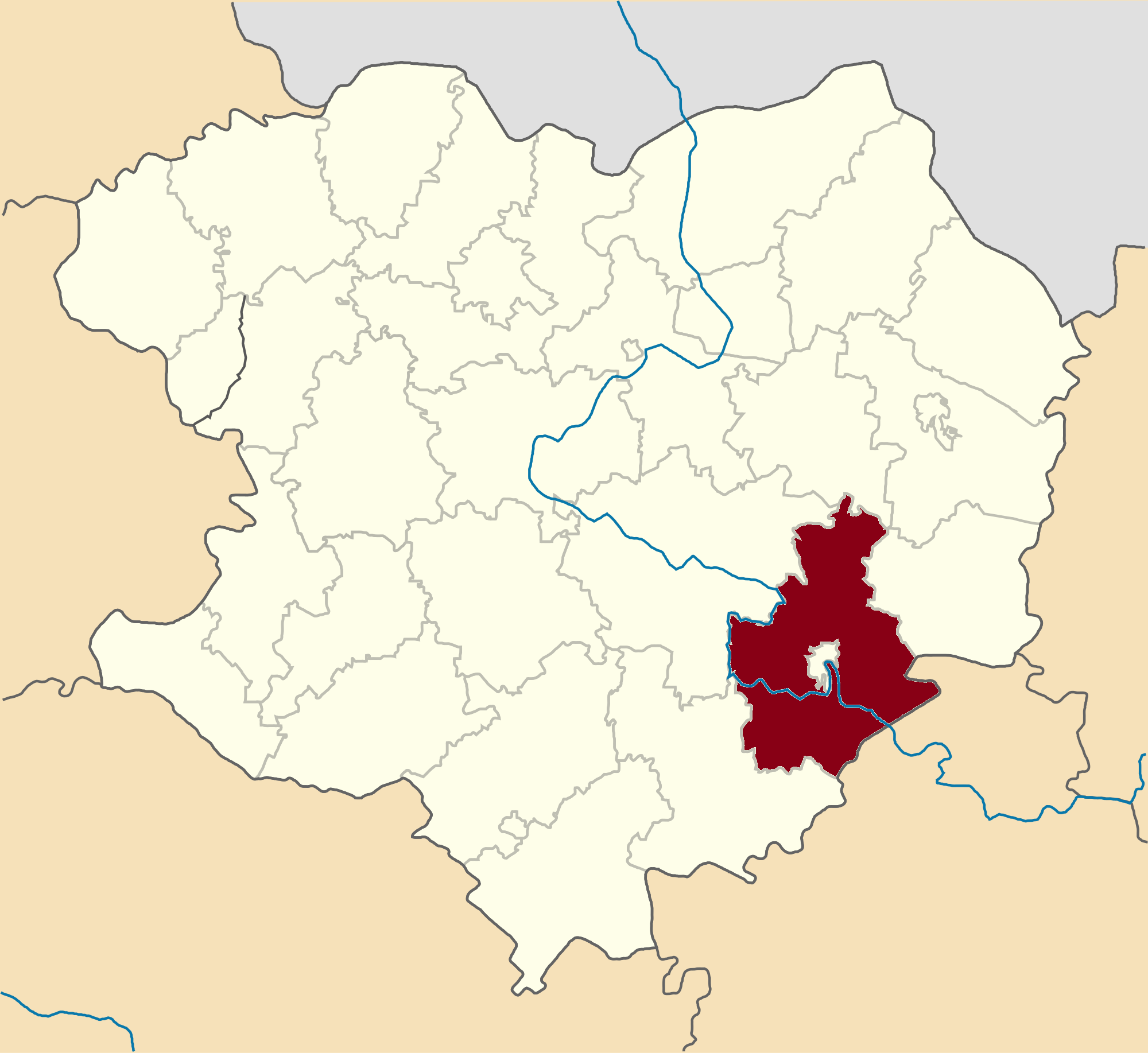
Izium Raion in Kharkiv Oblast before 2020

Before the 2020 reform, the raion consisted of two hromadas:

- Kunie rural hromada with the administration in Kunie;
- Oskil rural hromada with the administration in Oskil.

== Silrada ==
English name	Ukrainian name
Oleksandrivska	Олександрівська сільська рада
Brazhkivska	Бражківська сільська рада
Bryhadyrivska	Бригадирівська сільська рада
Buhaivska	Бугаївська сільська рада
Virnopilska	Вірнопільська сільська рада
Dovhenkivska	Довгеньківська сільська рада
Zavodska	Заводська сільська рада
Ivanchukivska	Іванчуківська сільська рада
Kamianska	Кам'янська сільська рада
Kapytolivska	Капитолівська сільська рада
Komarivska	Комарівська сільська рада
Kunievska	Куньєвська сільська рада
Levkivska	Левківська сільська рада
Malokomyshuvaska	Малокомишуваська сільська рада
Studenokska	Студенокська сільська рада
Chervonooskilska	Червонооскільська сільська рада
Chystovodivska	Чистоводівська сільська рада
