= Territorial control during the Russo-Ukrainian war =

Map of the oblasts of Ukraine. Russia had control of Crimea and parts of Donetsk and Luhansk (the striped areas) prior to the 2022 invasion.

This page provides information on the most recently known control of localities in Ukraine during the ongoing Russo-Ukrainian War, which started in 2014 and escalated with the Russian invasion of Ukraine in 2022. It includes all larger localities across the country, as well as some smaller localities close to current or recent lines of contact. It also includes a timeline of changes in territorial control, both of individual settlement captures and changes in the overall area under Russian control.

== Cherkasy Oblast ==
Name	Pop.	Raion	Held by	As of	More information
Cherkasy	272,651	Cherkasy	Ukraine	24 Feb 2022	
Chyhyryn	8,664	Cherkasy	Ukraine	1 Jan 2024	
Horodyshche	13,304	Cherkasy	Ukraine	1 Jan 2024	
Kamianka	11,146	Cherkasy	Ukraine	24 Feb 2022	
Kaniv	23,503	Cherkasy	Ukraine	24 Feb 2022	
Khrystynivka	10,068	Uman	Ukraine	24 Feb 2022	
Korsun-Shevchenkivskyi	17,474	Cherkasy	Ukraine	24 Feb 2022	
Monastyryshche	8,425	Uman	Ukraine	1 Jan 2024	
Shpola	16,573	Zvenyhorodka	Ukraine	24 Feb 2022	
Smila	66,475	Cherkasy	Ukraine	24 Feb 2022	
Talne	13,012	Zvenyhorodka	Ukraine	24 Feb 2022	
Uman	82,154	Uman	Ukraine	24 Feb 2022	
Vatutine	16,096	Zvenyhorodka	Ukraine	24 Feb 2022	
Zhashkiv	13,355	Uman	Ukraine	24 Feb 2022	
Zolotonosha	27,458	Zolotonosha	Ukraine	24 Feb 2022	
Zvenyhorodka	16,490	Zvenyhorodka	Ukraine	24 Feb 2022	

== Chernihiv Oblast ==
Name	Pop.	Raion	Held by	As of	More information
Bakhmach	17,192	Nizhyn	Ukraine	4 Apr 2022	
Baturyn	2,458	Nizhyn	Ukraine	1 Jan 2024	
Bobrovytsia	10,742	Nizhyn	Ukraine	4 Apr 2022	
Borzna	9,632	Nizhyn	Ukraine	4 Apr 2022	
Chernihiv (Note: Hero City of Ukraine)	285,234	Chernihiv	Ukraine	25 Mar 2022	See Siege of Chernihiv, Chernihiv bombing, Chernihiv breadline attack
Horodnia	11,710	Chernihiv	Ukraine	2 Apr 2022	Captured by Russia on 24 February 2022. Recaptured by Ukraine on 2 April 2022.
Ichnia	10,585	Pryluky	Ukraine	1 Jan 2024	
Koriukivka	12,409	Koriukivka	Ukraine	4 Apr 2022	Captured by Russia on 25 February 2022. Recaptured by Ukraine on 4 April 2022.
Kozelets	7,646	Chernihiv	Ukraine	29 Mar 2022	Captured by Russia on 3 March 2022. Recaptured by Ukraine on 31 March 2022.
Mena	11,096	Koriukivka	Ukraine	4 Apr 2022	
Mykhailo-Kotsiubynske	2,851	Chernihiv	Ukraine	2 Apr 2022	Captured by Russia on 28 February 2022. Recaptured by Ukraine on 2 April 2022.
Nizhyn	66,983	Nizhyn	Ukraine	1 Jan 2024	
Nosivka	13,120	Nizhyn	Ukraine	1 Jan 2024	
Nova Basan	2,929	Nizhyn	Ukraine	31 Mar 2022	Captured by Russia on 28 February 2022. Recaptured by Ukraine on 31 March 2022.
Novhorod-Siverskyi	12,647	Novhorod-Siverskyi	Ukraine	11 Mar 2022	
Novyi Bykiv	2,024	Nizhyn	Ukraine	2 Apr 2022	Captured by Russia on 25 February 2022. Recaptured by Ukraine on 31 March 2022.
Oster	5,655	Chernihiv	Ukraine	1 Jan 2024	
Pryluky	52,553	Pryluky	Ukraine	1 Jan 2024	
Ripky	6,807	Chernihiv	Ukraine	4 Apr 2022	Captured by Russia on 24 February 2022. Recaptured by Ukraine on 2 April 2022.
Sedniv	1,063	Chernihiv	Ukraine	4 Apr 2022	
Semenivka	7,952	Novhorod-Siverskyi	Ukraine	4 Apr 2022	Captured by Russia on 24 February 2022. Recaptured by Ukraine on 4 April 2022.
Snovsk	10,825	Koriukivka	Ukraine	4 Apr 2022	
Sosnytsia	6,708	Koriukivka	Ukraine	4 Apr 2022	

== Chernivtsi Oblast ==
Name	Pop.	Raion	Held by	As of	More information
Chernivtsi	265,471	Chernivtsi	Ukraine	24 Feb 2022	
Hertsa	2,108	Chernivtsi	Ukraine	2 Jan 2024	
Khotyn	9,075	Dniester	Ukraine	2 Jan 2024	
Kitsman	6,135	Chernivtsi	Ukraine	2 Jan 2024	
Novodnistrovsk	10,590	Dniester	Ukraine	24 Feb 2022	
Novoselytsia	7,514	Chernivtsi	Ukraine	2 Jan 2024	
Sokyriany	8,652	Dniester	Ukraine	2 Jan 2024	
Storozhynets	14,138	Storozhynets	Ukraine	24 Feb 2022	
Vashkivtsi	5,312	Vyzhnytsia	Ukraine	2 Jan 2024	
Vyzhnytsia	3,875	Vyzhnytsia	Ukraine	2 Jan 2024	
Zastavna	7,807	Chernivtsi	Ukraine	2 Jan 2024	

== Crimea and Sevastopol ==
Name	Pop.	Municipality or raion	Held by	As of	More information
Alupka	8,087	Yalta Municipality	Russia	4 Jan 2024	Captured by Russia on 27 February 2014.
Alushta	30,194	Alushta Municipality	Russia	4 Jan 2024	Captured by Russia on 27 February 2014.
Armiansk	21,239	Armiansk Municipality	Russia	4 Jan 2024	Captured by Russia on 27 February 2014.
Bakhchysarai	26,090	Bakhchysarai Raion	Russia	4 Jan 2024	Captured by Russia on 27 February 2014.
Bilohirsk	16,354 (Note: 2014 census)	Bilohirsk Raion	Russia	4 Jan 2024	Captured by Russia on 27 February 2014.
Kerch	149,566	Kerch City	Russia	24 Feb 2022	Captured by Russia on 27 February 2014.
Sevastopol	509,992	none (Note: City with special status)	Russia	24 Feb 2022	Captured by Russia on 27 February 2014.
Simferopol	332,317	Simferopol City	Russia	24 Feb 2022	Captured by Russia on 27 February 2014.
Yalta	76,746	Yalta City	Russia	24 Feb 2022	Captured by Russia on 27 February 2014.
Yevpatoria	105,719	Yevpatoria City	Russia	24 Feb 2022	Captured by Russia on 27 February 2014.

== Dnipropetrovsk Oblast ==
Name	Pop.	Raion	Held by	As of	More information
Apostolove	16,356	Kryvyi Rih	Ukraine	24 Feb 2022	
Chaplyne	3,655	Synelnykove	Ukraine	24 Feb 2022	See Chaplyne railway station attack
Dachne	121	Synelnykove	Russia	1 Jul 2025	Contested by Russia before 1 July 2025. Captured by Russia on 1 July 2025. Contested by Ukraine since around 6 July 2025. Recaptured by Russia on 24 July 2025.
Dnipro	980,948	Dnipro	Ukraine	24 Feb 2022	See Dnipro strikes
Hannivka	236	Kryvyi Rih	Ukraine	11 May 2022	
Kamianske	229,794	Kamianske	Ukraine	24 Feb 2022	
Kryvyi Rih	612,750	Kryvyi Rih	Ukraine	24 Feb 2022	See Bombing of Kryvyi Rih
Maliivka	161	Synelnykove	Ukraine	12 Aug 2026	Contested by Russia before 25 July 2025. Captured by Russia on 25 July 2025. Recontested by Ukraine since 14 July 2026. Recaptured by Ukraine on 12 August 2026.
Marhanets	45,718	Nikopol	Ukraine	24 Feb 2022	
Mezhova	7,022	Synelnykove	Ukraine	1 Sep 2024	
Nikopol	107,464	Nikopol	Ukraine	24 Feb 2022	
Novomoskovsk	70,230	Novomoskovsk	Ukraine	24 Feb 2022	
Novopavlivka	3,439	Synelnykove	Ukraine	19 Jun 2026	
Pavlohrad	103,073	Pavlohrad	Ukraine	24 Feb 2022	
Pershotravensk	27,573	Synelnykove	Ukraine	24 Feb 2022	
Piatykhatky	18,457	Kamianske	Ukraine	24 Feb 2022	
Pidhorodne	19,336	Dnipro	Ukraine	24 Feb 2022	
Pokrov	38,111	Nikopol	Ukraine	24 Feb 2022	
Prosiana	4,547	Synelnykove	Ukraine	7 Sep 2024	
Synelnykove	30,021	Synelnykove	Ukraine	24 Feb 2022	
Ternivka	29,226	Pavlohrad	Ukraine	24 Feb 2022	
Verkhivtseve	10,081	Kamianske	Ukraine	5 Jul 2022	
Verkhnodniprovsk	16,976	Kamianske	Ukraine	24 Feb 2022	
Vilnohirsk	22,458	Kamianske	Ukraine	24 Feb 2022	
Zaporizke	103	Synelnykove	Ukraine	12 Aug 2026	Captured by Russia on 26 August 2025. Recontested by Ukraine since 14 July 2026. Recaptured by Ukraine on 12 August 2026.
Zelenodolsk	12,874	Kryvyi Rih	Ukraine	27 Apr 2022	
Zhovti Vody	42,901	Kamianske	Ukraine	24 Feb 2022	

== Donetsk Oblast ==
Name	Pop.	Raion	Held by	As of	More information
Avdiivka	31,940	Pokrovsk	Russia	17 Feb 2024	See Battle of Avdiivka (2017), Battle of Avdiivka (2022–2024); Captured by Donetsk PR in mid-April 2014. Mostly recaptured by Ukraine on 21 July 2014. Recaptured by Russia on 17 February 2024.
Bakhmut	72,310	Bakhmut	Russia	23 May 2023	See Battle of Artemivsk (2014), Battle of Bakhmut (2022-2023); Captured by Donetsk PR in April 2014. Recaptured by Ukraine on 6 July 2014. Recaptured by Russia on 20 May 2023.
Chasiv Yar	12,557	Bakhmut	Russia	19 May 2024	See Battle of Chasiv Yar; Pressured by Russia between 4 April – 17 May 2024. Contested by Russia since 17 May 2024. Captured by Russia on 7 August 2025.
Debaltseve	24,316	Horlivka	Russia	20 Feb 2015	See Battle of Debaltseve (2015); Captured by Donetsk PR in mid-April 2014. Recaptured by Ukraine on 29 July 2014. Recaptured by Donetsk PR on 18 February 2015.
Dobropillia	28,170	Pokrovsk	Ukraine	24 Feb 2022	
Donetsk	905,364	Donetsk	Russia	22 Feb 2022	See March 2022 Donetsk attack Captured by Donetsk PR on 7 April 2014.
Druzhkivka	55,088	Kramatorsk	Ukraine	4 May 2022	
Hirnyk	10,357	Pokrovsk	Russia	27 Oct 2024	Claimed contested by Russian sources starting 18 September 2024. Confirmed contested by Russia between around 26 September – 26 October 2024. Captured by Russia on 27 October 2024.
Horlivka	241,106	Horlivka	Russia	9 Mar 2022	See Battle of Horlivka (2014); Captured by Donetsk PR in mid-April 2014.
Ilovaisk	17,620	Donetsk	Russia	20 Feb 2015	See Battle of Ilovaisk (2014); Captured by Donetsk PR in mid-April 2014. Recaptured by Ukraine on 19 August 2014. Recaptured by Donetsk PR on 1 September 2014.
Kostiantynivka	68,792	Kramatorsk	Contested	10 Mar 2022	See Battle of Kostiantynivka Captured by Donetsk PR in mid-April 2014. Recaptured by Ukraine on 7 July 2014. Contested by Russia since 4 November 2025.
Kramatorsk	150,084	Kramatorsk	Ukraine	4 May 2022	See Battle of Kramatorsk (2014), Kramatorsk railway station attack Captured by Donetsk PR on 12 April 2014. Recaptured by Ukraine on 5 July 2014.
Krasnohorivka	14,917	Pokrovsk	Russia	10 Sep 2024	See Battle of Krasnohorivka; Contested by Russia between 8 April – 8 September 2024. Captured by Russia on 9 September 2024.
Kurakhove	18,220	Pokrovsk	Russia	26 Dec 2024	See Battle of Kurakhove; Pressured by Russia between around 3–28 October 2024. Contested by Russia between 29 October – 24 December 2024. Likely captured by Russia on 25 December 2024.
Lyman	20,469	Kramatorsk	Contested	1 Oct 2022	See Battle of Krasnyi Lyman (2014), Battle of Lyman (September–October 2022); Captured by Donetsk PR in mid-April 2014. Recaptured by Ukraine on 5 June 2014. Recaptured by Russia/DPR on 27 May 2022. Recaptured by Ukraine on 1 October 2022. Contested by Russia since 26 November 2025.
Makiivka	340,337	Donetsk	Russia	9 Mar 2022	Captured by Donetsk PR on 13 April 2014.
Marinka	10,722	Pokrovsk	Russia	25 Dec 2023	See Battle of Marinka (2015), Battle of Marinka (2022–2023); Captured by Donetsk PR in mid-April 2014. Recaptured by Ukraine on 5 August 2014. Contested by Russia between around spring 2022 and 24 December 2023. Recaptured by Russia on 24–25 December 2023.
Mariupol	431,859	Mariupol	Russia	17 May 2022	See Battle of Mariupol (2014), 2014 offensive, 2015 attack, Siege of Mariupol, Hospital airstrike, Theatre airstrike Partially captured by Donetsk PR on 9 May 2014. Recaptured by Ukraine on 13 June 2014; Recaptured by Russia/DPR on 16 May 2022.
Myrnohrad	46,098	Pokrovsk	Russia	3 Feb 2026	Pressured by Russia since around 29 August 2024. Contested by Russia since around 25 October 2025. Captured by Russia in early February 2026.
Novoazovsk	11,104	Kalmiuske	Russia	28 Aug 2014	See Battle of Novoazovsk (2014); Captured by Donetsk PR in mid-April 2014. Recaptured by Ukraine in June 2014.
Novohrodivka	14,037	Pokrovsk	Russia	27 Aug 2024	Pressured by Russia between around 14–21 August 2024. Contested by Russia between around 22–26 August 2024. Captured by Russia around 27 August 2024.
Pokrovsk	61,161	Pokrovsk	Russia	25 Feb 2026	See Pokrovsk offensive Contested by Russia since July 2024. Captured by Russia in late January 2026.
Rodynske	9,850	Pokrovsk	Russia	22 Aug 2026	Contested by Russia since around 25 October 2025. Captured by Russia in 22 August 2026.
Selydove	21,916	Pokrovsk	Russia	30 Oct 2024	See Pokrovsk offensive § Battle for Selydove; Contested by Russia between around 28 August – 5 September 2024. Likely recaptured by Ukraine around 6 September 2024. Contested by Russia between around 27 September – late October 2024. Claimed captured by Russian sources on 27 October 2024. Claimed captured by Russia on 29 October 2024. Confirmed captured by Russia on 30 October 2024.
Siversk	11,068	Kramatorsk	Russia	21 Dec 2025	Confirmed captured by Russia on 21 December 2025.
Sloviansk	106,972	Kramatorsk	Ukraine	4 May 2022	See Murder of Pentecostals in Sloviansk (2014), Siege of Sloviansk; Captured by Donetsk PR in mid-April 2014. Recaptured by Ukraine on 5 July 2014.
Soledar	10,692	Bakhmut	Russia	16 Jan 2023	See Battle of Soledar; Captured by Donetsk PR in April 2014. Recaptured by Ukraine in July 2014. Recaptured by Russia 16 January 2023.
Svitlodarsk	11,281	Bakhmut	Russia	24 May 2022	Captured by Russia/DPR on 24 May 2022.
Toretsk	30,914	Bakhmut	Russia	7 Aug 2025	See Battle of Toretsk; Pressured by Russia between around 5 July – 21 August 2024. Contested by Russia since around 22 August 2024. Captured by Russia on 7 August 2025.
Ukrainsk	10,655	Pokrovsk	Russia	17 Sep 2024	Pressured by Russia between around 29 August – 5 September 2024. Claimed contested by Russian sources starting 29 August 2024. Contested by Russia between around 6–16 September. Confirmed with geolocated footage to be contested by 11 September. Captured by Russia on 17 September 2024.
Volnovakha	21,441	Volnovakha	Russia	11 Mar 2022	See Volnovakha bus attack (2015), Battle of Volnovakha; Captured by Donetsk PR on 11 March 2022.
Vuhledar	14,144	Volnovakha	Russia	1 Oct 2024	See Battle of Vuhledar; Captured by Russia on 1 October 2024.
Yenakiieve	77,053	Horlivka	Russia	24 Jun 2015	Captured by Donetsk PR on 13 April 2014.

== Ivano-Frankivsk Oblast ==
Name	Pop.	Raion	Held by	As of	More information
Burshtyn	14,866	Ivano-Frankivsk	Ukraine	24 Feb 2022	
Dolyna	20,641	Kalush	Ukraine	24 Feb 2022	
Ivano-Frankivsk	237,855	Ivano-Frankivsk	Ukraine	24 Feb 2022	See Ongoing missile strikes
Kalush	65,814	Kalush	Ukraine	24 Feb 2022	
Kolomyia	61,140	Kolomiya	Ukraine	24 Feb 2022	
Nadvirna	22,545	Nadvirna	Ukraine	24 Feb 2022	

== Kharkiv Oblast ==
Name	Pop.	Raion	Held by	As of	More information
Balakliia	26,921	Izium	Ukraine	8 Sep 2022	Captured by Russia on 3 March 2022. Recaptured by Ukraine on 8 September 2022.
Barvinkove	8,110	Izium	Ukraine	30 Apr 2022	
Berestove	230	Kupiansk	Russia	15 Nov 2024	Pressured by Russia between around 16–17 May 2024. Contested by Russia between around 18 May – 14 November 2024. Claimed by Russian sources between around 26–28 May 2024. Confirmed captured by Russia on 15 November 2024.
Bohodukhiv	15,797	Bohodukhiv	Ukraine	24 Feb 2022	
Bohuslavka	1330	Izium	Ukraine	5 Oct 2022	
Borivska Andriyivka	163	Izium	Ukraine	5 Oct 2022	
Borova	5,174	Izium	Ukraine	3 Oct 2022	Captured by Russia on 14 April 2022. Recaptured by Ukraine on 3 October 2022.
Borshchivka	3,139	Izium	Ukraine	9 Sep 2022	
Borysivka	533	Kharkiv	Russia	10 May 2024	Recaptured by Russia on 10 May 2024.
Buhaivka	1	Kharkiv	Ukraine	12 May 2024	
Buhruvatka	12	Chuhuiv	Russia	14 May 2024	Pressured and contested by Russia between 12 and 14 May 2024. Recaptured by Russia on 14 May 2024.
Cherkaski Tyshky	1,165	Kharkiv	Ukraine	10 May 2022	
Chkalovske	3,730	Chuhuiv	Ukraine	9 Sep 2022	Captured by Russia on 16 March 2022. Recaptured by Ukraine on 6 September 2022.
Chuhuiv	31,535	Chuhuiv	Ukraine	7 Mar 2022	See Chuhuiv air base attack Captured by Russia on 25 February 2022. Recaptured by Ukraine on 7 March 2022.
Derhachi	17,433	Kharkiv	Ukraine	6 Apr 2022	
Dovhenke	850	Izium	Ukraine	22 Aug 2022	See Sloviansk offensive
Dvorichna	3,387	Kupiansk	Russia	30 Nov 2024	Captured by Russia on 14 April 2022. Recaptured by Ukraine on 11 September 2022. Contested by Russia since around 30 November 2024. Claimed recaptured by Russian sources on 15 December 2024. Confirmed recaptured by Russia by 28 January 2025.
Dvorichne	326	Kupiansk	Russia	31 Dec 2023	Captured by Russia in February 2022. Recaptured by Ukraine 11 September 2022. Contested between 2022 and 2023. Recaptured by Russia on 10 February 2023.
Fyholivka	104	Kupiansk	Russia	6 Feb 2025	Recaptured by Russia on 6 February 2025.
Ivanivka	135	Kupiansk	Russia	9 Jun 2024	Pressured by Russia on 23 May 2024. Contested by Russia between around 24–25 May 2024. Recaptured by Russia between around 25 May – 6 June 2024.
Izium	45,884	Izium	Ukraine	10 Sep 2022	See Battle of Izium, Izium mass graves Captured by Russia on 27 March 2022. Recaptured by Ukraine by 10 September 2022.
Hatyshche	509	Chuhuiv	Russia	12 May 2024	Recaptured by Russia between around 10–11 May 2024.
Hlyboke	1,203	Kharkiv	Contested	18 Jun 2024	Recaptured by Russia between 11 and 13 May 2024. Pressured by Ukraine between around 7–16 June 2024. Contested by Ukraine since around 16 June 2024.
Holubivka	26	Kupiansk	Russia	25 Jul 2025	Contested by Russia before 25 July 2025. Captured by Russia on 25 July 2025.
Hoptivka	999	Kharkiv	Ukraine?	12 May 2024	
Horobivka	263	Kupiansk	Russia	31 Dec 2023	Captured by Russia in February 2022. Recaptured by Ukraine by 24 September 2022. Again recaptured by Russia by 18 October 2022.
Hrushivka	1,277	Kupiansk	Ukraine	8 Sep 2022	
Hrianykivka	607	Kupiansk	Russia	30 Dec 2023	
Husarivka	1,352	Izium	Ukraine	27 Mar 2022	Captured by Russia in 2022. Recaptured by Ukraine on 26/27 March 2022.
Izbytske	37	Chuhuiv	Ukraine	11 May 2024	
Kalynove	-	Kupiansk	Ukraine	31 Dec 2023	
Kamianka	961	Kupiansk	Ukraine	30 Dec 2023	
Kharkiv	1,433,886	Kharkiv	Ukraine	2 Mar 2022	See Battle of Kharkiv, Kharkiv cluster bombing, Dormitories missile strike
Khotimlia	1,351	Chuhuiv	Ukraine	29 Feb 2024	Captured by Russia on 24 February 2022. Recaptured by Ukraine on 10 September or 15 September 2022.
Kivsharivka	18,302	Kupiansk	Ukraine	28 Sep 2022	Сaptured by Russia in 2022. Recaptured by Ukraine on 28 September.
Kochetok	2,968	Chuhuiv	Ukraine	3 May 2022	
Kotliarivka	255	Kupiansk	Russia	5 May 2024	Pressured by Russia between around 28 January – 1 February 2024. Pressured and contested by Russia between 27 April – 4 May 2024. Recaptured by Russia on 4 May 2024.
Kozacha Lopan	5,005	Kharkiv	Ukraine	11 Sep 2022	Captured by Russia in February 2022. Recaptured by Ukraine 11 September 2022.
Krasne	20	Kharkiv	Russia	10 May 2024	Recaptured by Russia on 10 May 2024.
Krasne Pershe	84	Kupiansk	Ukraine	30 Dec 2023	
Krasnohrad	20,013	Krasnohrad	Ukraine	24 Feb 2022	
Krokhmalne	45	Kupiansk	Russia	20 Jan 2024	Recaptured by Russia on 20 January 2024.
Kruhliakivka	1,173	Kupiansk	Russia	31 Oct 2024	Contested by Russia between around 19–30 October 2024. Claimed captured by Russia on 30 October 2024. Confirmed captured by Russia on 31 October 2024.
Kudiivka	22	Kharkiv	Ukraine	12 May 2024	Claimed pressured by a Russian source since around 10–12 May 2024.
Kupiansk	27,169	Kupiansk	Ukraine	25 Jul 2025	Captured by Russia 27 February 2022. Recaptured by Ukraine by 10 September 2022. Contested by Russia between 14 and 24 November 2024. Contested by Russia from 25 July 2025 until November 2025. Confirmed liberated by Ukraine in November 2025.
Kupiansk-Vuzlovyi	8,397	Kupiansk	Ukraine	26 Sep 2022	Captured by Russia in 2022. Recaptured by Ukraine on 26 September 2022.
Kutuzivka	1,184	Kharkiv	Ukraine	28 Apr 2022	
Kyslivka	965	Kupiansk	Russia	6 May 2024	Contested by Russia between around 26 April and 6 May 2024. Recaptured by Russia around 6 May 2024.
Lebyazhe	1,534	Chuhuiv	Ukraine	20 Apr 2022	
Liubotyn	20,376	Kharkiv	Ukraine	24 Feb 2022	
Lozova	54,026	Lozova	Ukraine	24 Feb 2022	
Lozova	64	Izium	Russia	26 Dec 2024	Captured by Russia around 24 December 2024.
Lukiantsi	1,242	Kharkiv	Russia	15 May 2024	Pressured by Russia around 11 May 2024. Contested by Russia around 12 May 2024. Recaptured by Russia on 13 May 2024.
Lyman Pershyi	280	Kupiansk	Russia	19 Dec 2023	Captured by Russia in February 2022. Recaptured by Ukraine by 1 October 2022. Again recaptured by Russia on 16 February 2023.
Lyptsi	4,182	Kharkiv	Ukraine	25 May 2024	Captured by Russia in 2022. Recaptured by Ukraine 11 September 2022. Pressured by Russia between around 16–25 May 2024.
Malynivka	7,500	Chuhuiv	Ukraine	5 Apr 2022	Captured by Russia in early 2022. Recaptured by Ukraine on 5 April 2022.
Merefa	21,421	Kharkiv	Ukraine	24 Feb 2022	
Milove	508	Kupiansk	Contested	12 Jul 2025	Contested by Russia since 12 July 2025.
Molodova	595	Chuhuiv	Ukraine	3 May 2022	
Morokhovets	44	Kharkiv	Russia	11 May 2024	Recaptured by Russia on 11 May 2024.
Novomlynsk	16	Kupiansk	Russia	31 Jan 2025	Captured by Russia on 24 February 2022. Recaptured by Ukraine on 10 September 2022. Claimed by Russian sources on 4 June 2023. Recaptured by Russian forces in early January 2025.
Ohirtseve	234	Chuhuiv	Russia	11 May 2024	Recaptured by Russia around 10 May 2024.
Oliinykove	8	Kharkiv	Russia	11 May 2024	Recaptured by Russia on 11 May 2024.
Oskil	3,217	Izium	Ukraine	7 Sep 2022	Captured by Donetsk PR on 5 May 2022. Recaptured by Ukraine on 7 September 2022.
Pechenihy	5,058	Chuhuiv	Ukraine	3 May 2022	
Pervomaiskyi	28,986	Lozova	Ukraine	24 Feb 2022	
Petropavlivka	2,452	Kupiansk	Contested	13 Sep 2024	Contested by Russia since around 12 September 2024.
Pishchane	528	Kupiansk	Russia	20 Jul 2024	Claimed pressured by a Russian source between 16 June – 5 July 2024. Contested by Russia between 6 – 19 July 2024. Captured by Russia on 20 July 2024.
Pisky-Radkivski	2,507	Izium	Ukraine	26 Sep 2022	Captured by Russia on 2 March 2022. Recaptured by Ukraine on 26 September 2022.
Pivdenne	7,394	Kharkiv	Ukraine	24 Feb 2022	
Pletenivka	124	Chuhuiv	Russia	11 May 2024	Recaptured by Russia around 10 May 2024.
Protopopivka	1,253	Izium	Ukraine	4 May 2022	
Prylipka	12	Chuhuiv	Ukraine	21 May 2024	Pressured by Russia since around 21 May 2024.
Pylna	220	Kharkiv	Russia	10 May 2024	Recaptured by Russia on 10 May 2024.
Radkivka	39	Kupiansk	Ukraine	12 Dec 2025	Contested by Russia before 23 July 2025. Captured by Russia on 23 July 2025. Recaptured by Ukraine 12 December 2025.
Rubizhne	649	Chuhuiv	Ukraine	11 Sep 2022	Recaptured by Russia 19 May 2022. Ukrainian control claimed by Ukrainian sources as of 17 June 2022. Russian forces in control as of 23 August. Recaptured by Ukraine 11 September 2022.
Ruska Lozova	5,016	Kharkiv	Ukraine	6 May 2022	
Ruski Tyshky	1,908	Kharkiv	Ukraine	10 May 2022	
Savyntsi	5,266	Izium	Ukraine	8 Sep 2022	Captured by Russia in 2022. Recaptured by Ukraine on 8 September 2022.
Shevchenkove	6,724	Kupiansk	Ukraine	8 Sep 2022	Captured by Russia 26 February 2022. Recaptured by Ukraine on 7 September 2022.
Slatyne	6,076	Kharkiv	Ukraine	9 Apr 2022	
Sotnytskyi Kozachok	177	Bohodukhiv	Contested	4 Jul 2024	Raided by Russia on 26 June 2024. Raided by Russia and claimed captured on 4 July 2024.
Staryi Saltiv	3,394	Chuhuiv	Ukraine	2 May 2022	Captured by Russia in 2022. Recaptured by Ukraine on 2 May 2022.
Starytsia	486	Chuhuiv	Contested	19 Jun 2024	Pressured by Russia between 11 and 14 May 2024. Contested by Russia since 14 May 2024. Claimed by Russian sources between 15 and 18 May 2024.
Strilecha	2,097	Kharkiv	Russia	10 May 2024	Captured by Russia on 24 February 2022. Recaptured by Ukraine on 13 September 2022. Recaptured by Russia on 10 May 2024.
Stroivka	31	Kupiansk	Russia	29 May 2025	Contested by Russia since 27 May 2025. Captured by Russia on 29 May 2025.
Studenok	1,440	Izium	Ukraine	18 Sep 2022	Captured by Russia in March 2022. Multiple reports said Russian forces withdrew 15 September 2022.
Synkivka	389	Kupiansk	Russia	7 Sep 2024	Captured by Russia in 2022. Recaptured by Ukraine in the Kharkiv counteroffensive. Contested by Russia between around 28 November 2023 – 5 September 2024. Captured by Russia on 6 September 2024.
Tabaivka	34	Kupiansk	Russia	28 Feb 2024	Recaptured by Russia on 27 January 2024.
Tavilzhanka	1,924	Kupiansk	Russia	22 Nov 2022	Captured by Russia.
Ternova	907	Kharkiv	Ukraine	13 May 2024	
Tymkivka†	N/A	Kupiansk	Ukraine	11 Jun 2024	Claimed by Russian sources on 11 June 2024.
Tokarivka	16	Kharkiv	Ukraine	12 May 2024	
Topoli (rural settlement)	261	Kupiansk	Russia	23 Mar 2025	Captured by Russia in February 2022. Recaptured by Ukraine on about 11 September 2022. Demined by 7 September 2023. Recaptured by Russia on 23 March 2025.
Topoli (village)	860	Kupiansk	Russia	8 Mar 2022	Captured by Russia on 25 February 2022.
Tsyrkuny	6,310	Kharkiv	Ukraine	7 May 2022	
Tykhe	163	Chuhuiv	Contested	19 Jun 2024	Recaptured by Russia around 11 May 2024. Recaptured by Ukraine around 18 June 2024. Contested by Russia since around 12 January 2025.
Udy	1,677	Bohodukhiv	Ukraine	11 Sep 2022	Russia advanced in the settlement on 28 August. Recaptured by Ukraine on 11 September 2022.
Valky	8,721	Bohodukhiv	Ukraine	24 Feb 2022	
Velykyi Burluk	3,656	Kupiansk	Ukraine	11 Sep 2022	Captured by Russia on 24 February 2022. Recaptured by Ukraine on 10 September 2022.
Verbivka	3,515	Izium	Ukraine	7 Sep 2022	
Vilshana	1,500	Kupiansk	Russia	1 Mar 2022	Captured by Russia on 1 March 2022.
Vovchansk	17,747	Chuhuiv	Contested	12 May 2024	See also: Northern Kharkiv front of the Russo-Ukrainian war Captured by Russia on 24 February 2022. Recaptured by Ukraine on 11 September 2022. Pressured by Russia on 11 May 2024. Contested by Russia since 12 May 2024.
Vovchanski Khutory	1,340	Chuhuiv	Ukraine	18 May 2024	Claimed shared control by Russian sources since around 17 May 2024.
Yakovenkove	1,123	Izium	Ukraine	8 Sep 2022	Recaptured by Ukraine on 7 September 2022.
Zapadne	345	Kupiansk	Russia	6 Feb 2025	Claimed recaptured by Russia on 22 January 2025. Confirmed recaptured by Russia on 5 February 2025.
Zmiiv	14,071	Chuhuiv	Ukraine	24 Feb 2022	
Zolochiv	7,926	Bohodukhiv	Ukraine	10 Apr 2022	
Zybyne	115	Chuhuiv	Ukraine	18 May 2024	Claimed pressured and contested by Russian sources between 12 and 18 May 2024. Claimed by Russian sources on 17 May 2024.

== Kherson Oblast ==
Name	Pop.	Raion	Held by	As of	More information
Arkhanhelske	1,769	Beryslav	Ukraine	3 Oct 2022	Captured by Russia in March 2022. Recaptured by Ukraine on 2 October 2022.
Beryslav	12,123	Beryslav	Ukraine	30 Mar 2022	Captured by Russia on 27 February 2022. Recaptured by Ukraine in November 2022.
Bilohrudove	275	Skadovsk	Russia	20 May 2024	Contested by Ukraine between around 30 November – 3 December 2023.
Blahodatne	1,008	Kherson	Ukraine	14 Sep 2022	Controlled by Ukraine, according to a Ukrainian military journalist.
Borozenske	2,021	Beryslav	Ukraine	10 Nov 2022	Captured by Russia in 2022. Recaptured by Ukraine on 10 November 2022.
Chaplynka	9,539	Kakhovka	Russia	27 Apr 2022	Captured by Russia in 2022.
Chornobaivka	9,275	Kherson	Ukraine	27 Mar 2022	See 2022 Chornobaivka attacks Captured by Russia on 27 February 2022. Recaptured by Ukraine on 11 November.
Chulakivka	3,087	Skadovsk	Russia	15 Mar 2022	Captured by Russia on 15 March 2022.
Davydiv Brid	1,223	Beryslav	Ukraine	4 Oct 2022	See Battle of Davydiv Brid; Captured by Russia in March 2022. Recaptured by Ukraine on 4 October 2022.
Dudchany	2,102	Beryslav	Ukraine	4 Oct 2022	
Havrylivka	1,487	Beryslav	Ukraine	4 Oct 2022	
Henichesk	19,253	Henichesk	Russia	19 Apr 2022	Captured by Russia on 24 February 2022.
Kakhovka	35,400	Kakhovka	Russia	6 Sep 2022	Captured by Russia in February 2022.
Kalynivske	1,075	Beryslav	Ukraine	9 Nov 2022	Captured by Russia on 27 April 2022. Recaptured by Ukraine on 9 November 2022.
Kherson	283,649	Kherson	Ukraine	11 Nov 2022	See Battle of Kherson and Liberation of Kherson; Captured by Russia on 1 March 2022. Recaptured by Ukraine on 11 November 2022.
Kozachi Laheri	3,726	Kherson	Russia	10 Aug 2023	
Krynky	991	Kherson	Russia	19 Jul 2024	Captured by Russia in 2022. Contested by Ukraine between around 19 October 2023 – 17 July 2024. Recaptured by Russia around 18 July 2024.
Kyselivka	2,466	Kherson	Ukraine	10 Nov 2022	Recaptured by Ukraine 10 November 2022.
Liubymivka	1,695	Beryslav	Ukraine	2 Oct 2022	Captured by Russia in March 2022. Recaptured by Ukraine on 2 October 2022.
Mykhailivka	1,020	Beryslav	Ukraine	3 Oct 2022	
Nova Kakhovka	45,069	Kakhovka	Russia	27 Feb 2022	Captured by Russia on 24 February 2022.
Novooleksandrivka	1,335	Beryslav	Ukraine	3 Oct 2022	Captured by Russia in 2022. Recaptured by Ukraine on 3 October 2022.
Novoraisk	2,376	Beryslav	Ukraine	27 Apr 2022	Captured by Russia on 27 April 2022. Recaptured by Ukraine on 10 November 2022.
Novovorontsovka	6,081	Beryslav	Ukraine	27 Apr 2022	
Oleksandrivka	2,596	Kherson	Ukraine	10 Nov 2022	Captured by Russia on 17 April 2022. Recaptured by Ukraine on 10 November 2022.
Oleshky	24,383	Kherson	Russia	24 Feb 2022	Captured by Russia on 24 February 2022.
Osokorivka	2,747	Beryslav	Ukraine	6 Apr 2022	
Pishchanivka	582	Kherson	Russia	19 Oct 2023	Captured by Russia in 2022. Contested by Ukraine between 17 and 19 October 2023.
Poima	117	Kherson	Russia	19 Oct 2023	Captured by Russia in 2022. Recaptured by Ukraine on 17 October 2023. Recaptured by Russia on 18 October 2023.
Posad-Pokrovske	2,349	Kherson	Ukraine	21 Mar 2022	Captured by Russia on 9 March 2022. Recaptured by Ukraine on 21 March 2022.
Pravdyne	1,621	Kherson	Ukraine	9 Nov 2022	Captured by Russia in 2022. Recaptured by Ukraine on 9 November 2022.
Skadovsk	17,344	Skadovsk	Russia	13 Mar 2022	Captured by Russia on 9 March 2022.
Sokolohirne	709	Henichesk	Russia	15 Oct 2022	Captured by Russia on 25 February 2022.
Stanislav	4,909	Kherson	Ukraine	10 Nov 2022	Captured by Russia in March 2022. Recaptured by Ukraine on 10 November 2022.
Tiahynka	2,031	Beryslav	Ukraine	27 Apr 2022	Captured by Russia in 2022. Recaptured by Ukraine on 10 November.
Velyka Oleksandrivka	6,487	Beryslav	Ukraine	4 Oct 2022	Captured by Russia on 10 March 2022. Recaptured by Ukraine on 4 October 2022.
Vysokopillia	3,899	Beryslav	Ukraine	4 Sep 2022	Captured by Russia on 16 March 2022. Recaptured by Ukraine on 4 September 2022.
Zolota Balka	1,681	Beryslav	Ukraine	3 Aug 2022	Recaptured by Ukraine on 2 October 2022.

== Khmelnytskyi Oblast ==
Name	Pop.	Raion	Held by	As of	More information
Kamianets-Podilskyi	97,908	Kamianets-Podilskyi	Ukraine	24 Feb 2022	
Khmelnytskyi	274,582	Khmelnytskyi	Ukraine	24 Feb 2022	
Shepetivka	40,802	Shepetivka	Ukraine	24 Feb 2022	

== Kirovohrad Oblast ==
Name	Pop.	Raion	Held by	As of	More information
Kropyvnytskyi	222,695	Kropyvnytskyi	Ukraine	24 Feb 2022	
Oleksandriia	77,303	Oleksandriia	Ukraine	24 Feb 2022	
Svitlovodsk	43,931	Oleksandriia	Ukraine	24 Feb 2022	

== Kyiv Oblast and Kyiv ==
Name	Pop.	Raion	Held by	As of	More information
Bila Tserkva	208,737	Bila Tserkva	Ukraine	24 Feb 2022	
Borodianka	13,044	Bucha	Ukraine	1 Apr 2022	See Bombing of Borodianka
Brovary	109,473	Brovary	Ukraine	1 Apr 2022	See Battle of Brovary
Bucha	36,971	Bucha	Ukraine	1 Apr 2022	See Battle of Bucha, Bucha massacre Captured by Russia on 12 March 2022. Recaptured by Ukraine on 31 March 2022.
Buzova	1,548	Bucha	Ukraine	1 Apr 2022	
Chernobyl	2,500	Vyshhorod	Ukraine	2 Apr 2022	See Capture of Chernobyl; Captured by Russia on 24 February 2022. Recaptured by Ukraine on 2 April 2022.
Dymer	5,817	Vyshhorod	Ukraine	1 Apr 2022	Captured by Russia on 2 March 2022. Recaptured by Ukraine on 31 March 2022.
Fastiv	44,841	Fastiv	Ukraine	17 Mar 2022	
Hornostaipil	1,033	Vyshhorod	Ukraine	3 Apr 2022	Captured by Russia on 24 February 2022. Recaptured by Ukraine on 1 April 2022.
Hostomel	17,534	Bucha	Ukraine	1 Apr 2022	See Battle of Hostomel, Battle of Antonov Airport; Captured by Russia on 25 February 2022. Recaptured by Ukraine on 2 April 2022.
Irpin	62,456	Bucha	Ukraine	1 Apr 2022	See Battle of Irpin, Irpin refugee column shelling Partially captured by Russia on 14 March 2022. Recaptured by Ukraine on 28 March 2022.
Ivankiv	10,563	Vyshhorod	Ukraine	1 Apr 2022	Captured by Russia on 2 March 2022. Recaptured by Ukraine on 1 April 2022.
Klavdiievo-Tarasove	5,019	Bucha	Ukraine	2 Apr 2022	Captured by Russia in 2022. Recaptured by Ukraine on 1 April 2022.
Kyiv	2,962,180	none	Ukraine	28 Feb 2022	See Battle of Kyiv, Kyiv shopping centre bombing, Kyiv missile strikes
Makariv	9,589	Bucha	Ukraine	1 Apr 2022	Captured by Russia on 28 February 2022. Recaptured by Ukraine on 2 March 2022.
Nemishaieve	7,841	Bucha	Ukraine	3 Mar 2022	
Obukhiv	33,443	Obukhiv	Ukraine	24 Feb 2022	
Shevchenkove	2,913	Brovary	Ukraine	1 Apr 2022	
Slavutych (Note: Geographically within Chernihiv Oblast)	24,685	Vyshhorod	Ukraine	3 Apr 2022	See Battle of Slavutych; Captured by Russia on 26 March 2022. Recaptured by Ukraine on 3 April 2022.
Vasylkiv	37,310	Obukhiv	Ukraine	26 Feb 2022	
Velyka Dymerka	9,461	Brovary	Ukraine	1 Apr 2022	Captured by Russia in 2022. Recaptured by Ukraine on 1 April 2022.
Vorzel	6,766	Bucha	Ukraine	1 Apr 2022	
Vyshhorod	22,933	Vyshhorod	Ukraine	7 Mar 2022	

== Luhansk Oblast ==
Name	Pop.	Raion	Held by	As of	More information
Alchevsk	106,550	Alchevsk	Russia	2 May 2014	Captured by Luhansk PR on 30 April 2014.
Andriivka	67	Svatove	Russia	4 Oct 2024	Claimed by a Russian source on 10 June 2024. Pressured by Russia between around 7–19 July 2024. Contested by Russia between around 20 July – 3 October 2024. Claimed captured by Russian sources on 20 July 2024. Confirmed captured by Russia on 4 October 2024.
Bilohorivka	808	Sievierodonetsk	Russia	23 Feb 2025	Captured by Russia/LPR on 3 July 2022. Recaptured by Ukraine on 19 September 2022. Recaptured by Russia on 23 February 2025.
Chervonopopivka	1,042	Sievierodonetsk	Russia	20 Mar 2023	Captured by Russia/LPR on 26 March 2022.
Hirske	9,274	Sievierodonetsk	Russia	24 Jun 2022	Captured by Russia/LPR on 24 June 2022.
Kirovsk / Holubivka	26,838	Alchevsk	Russia	26 Feb 2022	Captured by Luhansk PR in mid-July 2014.
Hrekivka	53	Svatove	Russia	23 Jun 2025	Recaptured by Ukraine on 5 October 2022. Contested by Russia before 21 June 2025. Captured by Russia before 21 June 2025.
Kadiivka	73,702	Alchevsk	Russia	2 May 2014	Captured by Luhansk PR on 2 May 2014.
Krasnorichenske	4,020	Svatove	Russia		Captured by Luhansk PR in 2022.
Krasnyi Luch	79,764	Rovenki	Russia	25 Feb 2022	Captured by Luhansk PR in mid-April 2014.
Kreminna	18,417	Sievierodonetsk	Russia	19 Apr 2022	Captured by Russia/LPR on 18 April 2022.
Luhansk	399,559	Luhansk	Russia	25 Feb 2022	See Siege of the Luhansk Border Base (2014); Captured by Luhansk PR in mid-April 2014.
Lysychansk	95,031	Sievierodonetsk	Russia	3 Jul 2022	See Battle of Lysychansk; Captured by Luhansk PR in mid-April 2014. Recaptured by Ukraine on 25 July 2014. Recaptured by Russia/LPR 2 July 2022.
Makiivka	831	Svatove	Russia	16 Oct 2024	Raided by Russia on 20 March 2023. Contested by Russia between around 13 July – September 2024. Claimed captured by Russia on 29 September 2024. Confirmed captured by Russia on 16 October 2024.
Miasozharivka	37	Svatove	Russia	7 Oct 2024	Claimed contested by Russian sources since around 18–31 May 2024. Claimed by Russian sources on 11 June 2024. Captured by Russia around 7 October 2024.
Nevske	729	Svatove	Russia	16 Oct 2024	Claimed captured by Russian sources on 21 September 2024. Confirmed captured by Russia on 16 October 2024.
Novodruzhesk	6,806	Sievierodonetsk	Russia	1 Jul 2022	See Battle of Lysychansk; Captured by Russia/LPR on 1 July 2022.
Novoselivske	736	Svatove	Russia	7 Aug 2023	Captured by Russia/LPR on 6 March 2022. Recaptured by Russia by around 29 November 2022. Recaptured by Ukraine on 30 December 2022. Recaptured by Russia on 5 August 2023.
Popasna	19,672	Sievierodonetsk	Russia	8 May 2022	See Battle of Popasna; Captured by Luhansk PR in mid-April 2014. Recaptured by Ukraine on 19 June 2014. Recaptured by Luhansk PR on 8 July 2014. Recaptured by Ukraine on 22 July 2014. Recaptured by Russia/LPR on 7 May 2022.
Pryvillia	6,679	Sievierodonetsk	Russia	1 Jul 2022	See Battle of Lysychansk; Captured by Russia/LPR on 1 July 2022.
Rubizhne	56,066	Sievierodonetsk	Russia	12 May 2022	See Battle of Rubizhne; Captured by Luhansk PR in 2014. Recaptured by Ukraine in July 2014. Recaptured by Russia/LPR on 12 May 2022
Serhiivka	20	Svatove	Russia	12 Nov 2023	Captured by Russia/LPR early in the war. Recaptured by Ukraine on 26 October 2022. Recaptured by Russia on 25 July 2023.
Shchastia	11,552	Shchastia	Russia	12 Mar 2022	Captured by Luhansk PR in 2014. Recaptured by Ukraine on 14 June 2014. Recaptured by Russia/Lugansk PR on 26 February 2022.
Sievierodonetsk	101,135	Sievierodonetsk	Russia	25 Jun 2022	See Battles of Sievierodonetsk (2014), Battle of Sievierodonetsk (2022); Captured by Luhansk PR in late May 2014. Recaptured by Ukraine on 22 July 2014. Recaptured by Russia/LPR on 25 June 2022.
Starobilsk	16,267	Starobilsk	Russia	13 Mar 2022	See Battle of Starobilsk (2022); Captured by Russia/LPR on 26 February 2022.
Stelmakhivka	505	Svatove	Russia	30 Aug 2024	Captured by Russia/LPR in March 2022. Recaptured by Ukraine in October 2022. Claimed contested by Russian sources starting 25 June 2024. Confirmed contested by Russia between around 14 July – 29 August 2024. Recaptured by Russia on 30 August 2024.
Svatove	16,420	Svatove	Russia	9 Mar 2022	Captured by Russia/LPR on 6 March 2022.
Toshkivka	4,088	Sievierodonetsk	Russia	21 Jun 2022	See Battle of Toshkivka; Capture claimed by Russia/LPR on 21 June 2022.
Zolotarivka	631	Sievierodonetsk	Russia	21 Oct 2022	Captured by Russia/LPR on 4 July 2022. Claimed recaptured by Ukraine on 21 October 2022, but not verified.
Zolote	13,203	Sievierodonetsk	Russia	24 Jun 2022	Captured by Russia/LPR on 24 June 2022.

== Lviv Oblast ==
Name	Pop.	Raion	Held by	As of	More information
Brody	23,335	Zolochiv	Ukraine	24 Feb 2022	
Chervonohrad	65,180	Chervonohrad	Ukraine	24 Feb 2022	
Drohobych	74,610	Drohobych	Ukraine	24 Feb 2022	
Lviv	717,486	Lviv	Ukraine	24 Feb 2022	See October missile strikes Many diplomatic missions temporarily relocated to Lviv from Kyiv.
Sambir	34,444	Sambir	Ukraine	24 Feb 2022	
Truskavets	28,474	Drohobych	Ukraine	24 Feb 2022	
Yavoriv	12,888	Yavoriv	Ukraine	24 Feb 2022	See Yavoriv military base attack

== Mykolaiv Oblast ==
Name	Pop.	Raion	Held by	As of	More information
Barativka	1,088	Bashtanka	Ukraine	11 Nov 2022	Captured by Russia on 18 March 2022. Recaptured by Ukraine in November 2022.
Kinburn Spit	Unknown	Mykolaiv	Contested	8 Jun 2026	Contested by Ukraine in June 2026.
Lupareve	1,268	Mykolaiv	Ukraine	23 Apr 2022	
Mykolaiv	476,101	Mykolaiv	Ukraine	18 Mar 2022	See Battle of Mykolaiv, Mykolaiv cluster bombing, Government building airstrike
Novomykolaivka	1,161	Mykolaiv	Ukraine	9 Jul 2022	Captured by Russia on 4 July 2022. Recaptured by Ukraine on 16 August 2022.
Novopetrivka	1,722	Bashtanka	Ukraine	11 Nov 2022	Captured by Russia on 3 March 2022. Recaptured by Ukraine on 27 April 2022. Recaptured by Russia on 23 May 2022. Recaptured by Ukraine in November 2022.
Ochakiv	13,927	Mykolaiv	Ukraine	24 Feb 2022	
Oleksandrivka	1,336	Bashtanka	Ukraine	11 Nov 2022	Captured by Russia on 11 March 2022. Recaptured by Ukraine on 11 November 2022.
Partyzanske	1,021	Bashtanka	Ukraine	11 Nov 2022	Captured by Russia on 3 March 2022. Recaptured by Ukraine in April 2022. Contested in September–November 2022.
Pervomaiske	2,698	Mykolaiv	Ukraine	11 Nov 2022	Captured by Russia on 2 September 2022. Recaptured by Ukraine in 2022.
Pokrovka	229	Mykolaiv	Russia	9 Nov 2022	Captured by Russia in 2022.
Pokrovske	181	Mykolaiv	Russia	9 Nov 2022	Captured by Russia in 2022.
Shevchenkove	3,150	Mykolaiv	Ukraine	18 Mar 2022	
Snihurivka	12,307	Bashtanka	Ukraine	9 Nov 2022	Captured by Russia on 13 March 2022. Recaptured by Ukraine on 10 November 2022.
Tsentralne	1,247	Mykolaiv	Ukraine	11 Nov 2022	Captured by Russia on 18 June 2022. Recaptured by Ukraine in November 2022.
Ukrainka	1,170	Mykolaiv	Ukraine	18 Mar 2022	
Vasylivka	382	Mykolaiv	Russia	4 Sep 2022	Captured by Russia in 2022.
Voznesensk	34,050	Voznesensk	Ukraine	14 Mar 2022	See Battle of Voznesensk
Vynohradivka	1,388	Bashtanka	Ukraine	25 Mar 2022	

== Odesa Oblast ==
Name	Pop.	Raion	Held by	As of	More information
Bile (Snake Island)	≈ 100	Izmail	Ukraine	30 Jun 2022	See Snake Island campaign Captured by Russia on 24 February 2022. Recaptured by Ukraine on 30 June 2022.
Bilhorod-Dnistrovskyi	48,197	Bilhorod-Dnistrovskyi	Ukraine	24 Feb 2022	
Izmail	70,731	Izmail	Ukraine	24 Feb 2022	
Odesa	1,015,826	Odesa	Ukraine	24 Feb 2022	See Bombing of Odesa
Podilsk	39,662	Podilsk	Ukraine	24 Feb 2022	
Serhiivka	5,316	Bilhorod-Dnistrovskyi	Ukraine	24 Feb 2022	See Serhiivka missile strike

== Poltava Oblast ==
Name	Pop.	Raion	Held by	As of	More information
Bobryk	4,299	Myrhorod	Ukraine	6 Mar 2022	Captured by Russia on 28 February 2022. Recaptured by Ukraine on 5 March 2022.
Hadiach	22,581	Myrhorod	Ukraine	28 Feb 2022	Russian tanks spotted and captured near Hadiach after skirmishes on 27 February 2022
Kremenchuk	217,710	Kremenchuk	Ukraine	24 Feb 2022	See Kremenchuk shopping mall attack
Lubny	44,595	Lubny	Ukraine	24 Feb 2022	
Myrhorod	38,447	Myrhorod	Ukraine	24 Feb 2022	
Pirky	703	Poltava	Ukraine	4 Mar 2022	Captured by Russia on 2 March 2022. Recaptured by Ukraine on 3 March 2022.
Poltava	283,402	Poltava	Ukraine	24 Feb 2022	See October missile strikes

== Rivne Oblast ==
Name	Pop.	Raion	Held by	As of	More information
Dubno	37,257	Dubno	Ukraine	24 Feb 2022	
Kostopil	31,060	Rivne	Ukraine	24 Feb 2022	
Rivne	245,289	Rivne	Ukraine	24 Feb 2022	
Sarny	28,865	Sarny	Ukraine	24 Feb 2022	
Varash	42,126	Varash	Ukraine	24 Feb 2022	

== Sumy Oblast ==
Name	Pop.	Raion	Held by	As of	More information
Andriivka	83	Sumy	Contested	13 May 2026	Contested by Russia before 6 June 2025. Captured by Russia 6 June 2025. Recaptured by Ukraine on 23 June 2025. Recaptured by Russia before 25 January 2026. Recaptured by Ukraine on 22 April 2026. Re-contested by Russia on 13 May 2026.
Basivka	644	Sumy	Russia	9 Apr 2025	Contested by Russia since 13 March 2025. Captured by Russia 9 April 2025.
Bilovody	487	Sumy	Russia	26 May 2025	Contested by Russia since 29 April 2025. Captured by Russia 25 May 2025.
Buryn	8,359	Konotop	Ukraine	6 Apr 2022	Captured by Russia 24 February 2022. Recaptured by Ukraine 4 April 2022.
Hlukhiv	32,248	Hlukhiv	Ukraine	6 Apr 2022	
Hrabovske	718	Sumy	Russia	21 Dec 2025	Contested by Russia on 20 December 2025. Captured by Russia 21 December 2025.
Ivolzhanske	226	Sumy	Contested	21 May 2026	Contested by Russia on 21 May 2026.
Kindrativka	852	Sumy	Contested	17 Feb 2026	Contested by Russia since 7 June 2025. Claimed captured by Russian sources as of 10 June 2025. Captured by Russia 16 June 2025. Contested by Ukraine since 8 July 2025. Captured by Ukraine on 25 July 2025. Re-contested by Russia since 17 February 2026.
Konotop	84,787	Konotop	Ukraine	6 Apr 2022	Captured by Russia 25 February 2022. Recaptured by Ukraine 4 April 2022.
Kostiantynivka	246	Sumy	Contested	30 Oct 2025	Contested by Russia before 29 May 2025. Captured by Russia 29 May 2025. Recontested by Ukraine since 11 August 2025.
Krolevets	22,437	Konotop	Ukraine	6 Apr 2022	
Lebedyn	24,238	Lebedyn	Ukraine	6 Apr 2022	
Loknya	368	Sumy	Russia	1 Jul 2025	Contested by Russia since 24 April 2025. Claimed captured by Russian sources as of 10 June 2025. Confirmed captured by Russia 1 July 2025.
Myropillia	2,873	Sumy	Contested	11 Jul 2025	Contested by Russia since 11 July 2025.
Myropilske	158	Sumy	Russia	23 Apr 2026	Contested by Russia on 18 April 2026. Captured by Russia 23 April 2026.
Nova Sich	378	Sumy	Contested	24 Jun 2026	Contested by Russia on 24 June 2026.
Novenke	15	Sumy	Russia	8 Mar 2025	Contested by Russia since 27 February 2025. Captured by Russia on 8 March 2025.
Novodmytrivka	242	Sumy	Contested	28 May 2026	Contested by Russia on 28 May 2026.
Novomykolaivka	136	Sumy	Russia	18 Jul 2025	Contested by Russia since 4 July 2025. Captured by Russia 4 July 2025. Contested by Ukraine on 8 July 2025. Recaptured by Russia on 19 July 2025.
Okhtyrka	47,216	Okhtyrka	Ukraine	6 Apr 2022	
Oleksiivka	547	Sumy	Contested	7 Nov 2025	Contested by Russia since 7 June 2025. Claimed captured by Russian sources as of 10 June 2025. Confirmed captured by Russia on 12 June 2025. Recaptured by Ukraine on 21 July 2025. Recontested by Russia since 11 August 2025. Recaptured by Russia on 5 November 2025. Recontested by Ukraine since 7 November 2025.
Pokrovka	768	Sumy	Contested	8 Feb 2026	Contested by Russia on 8 February 2026.
Popivka	6	Sumy	Russia	28 May 2026	Contested by Russia before 28 May 2026. Captured by Russia 28 May 2026.
Prokhody	60	Sumy	Contested	18 Apr 2026	Contested by Russia on 18 April 2026.
Putyvl	15,100	Konotop	Ukraine	6 Apr 2022	Captured by Russia 27 February 2022. Recaptured by Ukraine 2 April 2022.
Pysarivka	829	Sumy	Contested	24 Jun 2026	Contested by Russia on 24 June 2026.
Riasne	814	Sumy	Contested	8 Aug 2026	Contested by Russia since 3 May 2026. Captured by Ukraine on 23 May 2026. Re-contested by Russia since 28 May 2026. Captured by Russia on 13 July 2026. Recontested by Ukraine on 8 August 2026.
Romny	38,305	Romny	Ukraine	6 Apr 2022	
Ryzhivka	854	Sumy	Gray zone	12 Jun 2024	Uncontrolled before 9 June 2024. Raided by Russia on 9 June 2024. Uncontrolled since 10 June 2024.
Shostka	73,197	Shostka	Ukraine	6 Apr 2022	
Sopych	763	Sumy	Russia	6 Mar 2026	Contested by Russia before 6 March 2026. Captured by Russia 6 March 2026.
Sumy	259,660	Sumy	Ukraine	6 Apr 2022	See Battle of Sumy, Sumykhimprom ammonia leak, October missile strikes
Taratutyne	73	Sumy	Contested	20 Jul 2026	Contested by Russia on 20 July 2026.
Trostianets	19,797	Okhtyrka	Ukraine	6 Apr 2022	Captured by Russia 1 March 2022. Recaptured by Ukraine 26 March 2022.
Varachyne	60	Sumy	Ukraine	21 Aug 2025	Contested by Russia before 23 July 2025. Captured by Russia 23 July 2025. Recaptured by Ukraine on 21 August 2025.
Veselivka	67	Sumy	Russia	30 Mar 2025	Claimed captured by Russia on 29 March 2025. Confirmed captured by Russia on 30 March 2025.
Vodolahy	151	Sumy	Russia	4 Jun 2025	Contested by Russia before 4 June 2025. Captured by Russia 4 June 2025.
Volodymyrivka	144	Sumy	Russia	29 May 2025	Contested by Russia before 29 May 2025. Captured by Russia 29 May 2025.
Vysoke	28	Sumy	Russia	28 May 2026	Contested by Russia on 19 January 2026. Captured by Russia 28 May 2026.
Yablunivka	168	Sumy	Russia	20 Jul 2025	Contested by Russia since 7 June 2025. Captured by Russia 20 July 2025.
Yunakivka	1,741	Sumy	Ukraine	14 Jul 2025	Contested by Russia since 14 July 2025. Recaptured by Ukraine on 16 November 2026.
Zhuravka	163	Sumy	Russia	17 May 2025	Contested by Russia since 21 March 2025. Captured by Russia 26 April 2025.
Zapsillia	654	Sumy	Contested	9 Jun 2026	Contested by Russia on 9 June 2026.

== Ternopil Oblast ==
Name	Pop.	Raion	Held by	As of	More information
Berezhany	17,316	Ternopil	Ukraine	24 Feb 2022	
Chortkiv	28,393	Chortkiv	Ukraine	24 Feb 2022	
Ternopil	225,238	Ternopil	Ukraine	24 Feb 2022	See October missile strikes

== Vinnytsia Oblast ==
Name	Pop.	Raion	Held by	As of	More information
Bar	15,563	Zhmerynka	Ukraine	24 Feb 2022	
Bershad	12,446	Haisyn	Ukraine	24 Feb 2022	
Haisyn	25,883	Haisyn	Ukraine	24 Feb 2022	
Hnivan	12,314	Vinnytsia	Ukraine	24 Feb 2022	
Kalynivka	18,695	Khmilnyk	Ukraine	24 Feb 2022	
Khmilnyk	27,158	Khmilnyk	Ukraine	24 Feb 2022	
Koziatyn	22,634	Khmilnyk	Ukraine	24 Feb 2022	
Ladyzhyn	22,593	Haisyn	Ukraine	24 Feb 2022	
Mohyliv-Podilskyi	30,186	Mohyliv-Podilskyi	Ukraine	24 Feb 2022	
Tulchyn	14,668	Tulchyn	Ukraine	24 Feb 2022	
Vinnytsia	370,601	Vinnytsia	Ukraine	24 Feb 2022	See Vinnytsia missile strikes
Zhmerynka	34,097	Zhmerynka	Ukraine	24 Feb 2022	

== Volyn Oblast ==
Name	Pop.	Raion	Held by	As of	More information
Kivertsi	13,917	Lutsk	Ukraine	24 Feb 2022	
Kovel	67,991	Kovel	Ukraine	24 Feb 2022	
Lutsk	217,197	Lutsk	Ukraine	24 Feb 2022	
Novovolynsk	50,417	Volodymyr	Ukraine	24 Feb 2022	
Rozhyshche	12,584	Lutsk	Ukraine	24 Feb 2022	
Volodymyr	38,070	Volodymyr	Ukraine	24 Feb 2022	

== Zakarpattia Oblast ==
Name	Pop.	Raion	Held by	As of	More information
Berehove	23,485	Berehove	Ukraine	24 Feb 2022	
Khust	28,206	Khust	Ukraine	24 Feb 2022	
Mukachevo	85,903	Mukachevo	Ukraine	24 Feb 2022	
Rakhiv	15,596	Rakhiv	Ukraine	24 Feb 2022	
Svaliava	17,124	Mukachevo	Ukraine	24 Feb 2022	
Uzhhorod	115,542	Uzhhorod	Ukraine	24 Feb 2022	
Vynohradiv	25,442	Berehove	Ukraine	24 Feb 2022	

== Zaporizhzhia Oblast ==
Name	Pop.	Raion	Held by	As of	More information
Berdiansk	107,928	Berdiansk	Russia	24 May 2022	See Berdiansk port attack Captured by Russia 27 February 2022.
Chernihivka	5,645	Berdiansk	Russia	17 Mar 2022	Captured by Russia 14 March 2022.
Dniprorudne	18,036	Vasylivka	Russia	22 Apr 2022	Captured by Russia 4 March 2022.
Dorozhnianka	327	Polohy	Russia	28 Dec 2023	Recaptured by Russia between 31 December 2022 – 2 January 2023.
Enerhodar	52,887	Vasylivka	Russia	4 Mar 2022	See Battle of Enerhodar; Captured by Russia 4 March 2022.
Fedorivka	2,214	Polohy	Russia	27 Jul 2023	
Huliaipole	13,070	Polohy	Russia	6 Feb 2026	See Shelling of Huliaipole and Huliaipole offensive Contested by Russia since November 2025. Captured by Russia in early February 2026.
Inzhenerne	1,003	Polohy	Russia	21 May 2022	
Kamianka	6,507	Polohy	Russia	15 Mar 2022	Captured by Russia 14 March 2022.
Kamianka-Dniprovska	12,332	Vasylivka	Russia	2 Mar 2022	Captured by Russia 2 March 2022.
Kamianske	2,639	Vasylivka	Russia	7 Oct 2024	Shared control between around May 2022 – 5 October 2024. Contested by Russia since 6 October 2024. Claimed captured by Russia which is confirmed by independent Ukrainian sources since 31 July 2025.
Kopani	616	Polohy	Russia	11 Oct 2022	
Levadne	1	Polohy	Russia	26 Oct 2024	Captured by Russia before the 2023 Ukrainian counteroffensive. Recaptured by Ukraine between 12 and 14 June 2023. Claimed recaptured by Russian sources on 12–13 October 2024. Confirmed recaptured by Russia on 26 October 2024.
Lobkove	99	Vasylivka	Russia	2 Apr 2025	Claimed captured by Russia 20 January 2023. Recaptured by Ukraine around 9–11+ June 2023. Contested by Russia since 25 March 2025. Recaptured by Russia around 2 April 2025.
Mala Tokmachka	200	Polohy	Contested	24 Nov 2025	See also: Battle of Mala Tokmachka Contested by Russia since 24 November 2025.
Malynivka	873	Polohy	Russia	14 Jul 2025	Contested by Russia since 20 June 2025. Captured by Russia around 14 July 2025.
Melitopol	150,768	Melitopol	Russia	16 May 2022	See Capture of Melitopol; Captured by Russia 25 February 2022.
Mykhailivka	11,694	Vasylivka	Russia	13 May 2022	
Myrne	872	Polohy	Russia	24 Apr 2022	
Nesterianka	1,566	Polohy	Russia	3 Sep 2022	
Novodarivka	48	Polohy	Russia	24 Nov 2024	Captured by Russia before the 2023 Ukrainian counteroffensive. Recaptured by Ukraine around 11–14+ June 2023. Contested by Russia since 23 November 2024. Claimed re-captured by Russia on 3 December 2024. Confirmed recaptured by Russia on 19 May 2025.
Novomykolaivka	5,059	Zaporizhzhia	Ukraine	24 Feb 2022	
Novoprokopivka	747	Polohy	Russia	24 Aug 2023	
Novopokrovka	314	Polohy	Russia	17 Aug 2023	
Orikhiv	14,136	Polohy	Ukraine	30 Mar 2022	
Piatykhatky	301	Vasylivka	Russia	17 Mar 2025	Captured by Russia before the 2023 Ukrainian counteroffensive. Recaptured by Ukraine around 21–25+ June 2023. Contested by Russia since 16 March 2025. Recaptured by Russia by 25 March 2025
Polohy	18,396	Polohy	Russia	30 Mar 2022	Captured by Russia 7 March 2022.
Plavni	329	Vasylivka	Contested	26 May 2026	Contested by Russia between around 6 October – December 2024. Recontested by Russia since 11 July 2025. Captured by Russia on 28 August 2025. Recontested by Ukraine on 26 May 2026.
Prymorsk	11,397	Berdiansk	Russia	1 Mar 2022	Captured by Russia 28 February 2022.
Robotyne	480	Polohy	Russia	23 May 2024	Captured by Russia in March 2022. Recaptured by Ukraine between 28 August – 1 September 2023. Contested by Russia between around 19 February – 20 May 2024. Recaptured by Russia around 20 May 2024.
Rozivka	3,022	Polohy	Russia	30 Apr 2022	
Stepnohirsk	4,294	Vasylivka	Contested	15 Oct 2022	Held by Ukraine on 15 October 2022. Contested by Russia since October 2025.
Tokmak	30,132	Polohy	Russia	22 Apr 2022	Captured by Russia 7 March 2022.
Vasylivka	12,771	Vasylivka	Russia	23 May 2022	Captured by Russia by 2 March 2022.
Verbove	1,246	Polohy	Russia	1 Aug 2023	Captured by Russia in 2022.
Zahirne	14	Polohy	Russia	16 Jun 2024	Claimed uncontrolled by a Russian source between around 2023 – 16 June 2024. Claimed by some Russian sources around 16 June 2024.
Zaporizhzhia	722,713	Zaporizhzhia	Ukraine	24 Feb 2022	See Civilian convoy attack, Residential building airstrike, October missile strikes

== Zhytomyr Oblast ==
Name	Pop.	Raion	Held by	As of	More information
Berdychiv	73,999	Berdychiv	Ukraine	24 Feb 2022	
Narodychi	2,907	Korosten	Ukraine	4 Apr 2022	
Pershotravneve	2,260	Korosten	Ukraine	3 Apr 2022	
Radcha	265	Korosten	Ukraine	3 Apr 2022	Captured by Russia 24 February 2022; Recaptured by Ukraine 3 April 2022
Zhytomyr	263,507	Zhytomyr	Ukraine	24 Feb 2022	See 2022 Zhytomyr attacks, Infrastructure attacks
Zviahel	55,463	Zviahel	Ukraine	24 Feb 2022	

== Kursk Oblast, Russia ==
Name	Pop.	District	Held by	As of	More information
Belaya	2,598	Belovsky	Russia	6 Aug 2024	
Bolshoye Soldatskoye	2,681	Bolshesoldatsky	Russia	6 Aug 2024	
Glushkovo	4,785	Glushkovsky	Russia	6 Aug 2024	
Korenevo	6,119	Korenevsky	Russia	6 Aug 2024	
Kurchatov	42,706	none	Russia	6 Aug 2024	
Kursk	440,052	none	Russia	6 Aug 2024	
Lgov	21,453	none	Russia	6 Aug 2024	
Malaya Loknya	799	Sudzhansky	Russia	9 Mar 2025	Mostly captured by Ukraine on 8 August 2024. Contested by Russia since 9 August 2024. Likely captured by Ukraine on 4 September 2024. Recaptured by Russia by 9 March 2025.
Rylsk	15,069	Rylsky	Russia	6 Aug 2024	
Slobodka-Ivanovka	58	Rylsky	Contested	11 Aug 2024	Captured by Ukraine since 11 August 2024.
Snagost	494	Korenevsky	Russia	14 Sep 2024	Contested by Ukraine on 8 August 2024. Likely fully recaptured by Russia on 9 August 2024. Contested by Ukraine since around 11 August 2024. Likely captured by Ukraine on 18 August 2024. Contested by Russia between around 10–12 September 2024. Claimed recaptured by Russian sources on 11 September 2024. Confirmed recaptured by Russia on 13 September 2024.
Sudzha	6,036	Sudzhansky	Russia	12 Mar 2025	Contested by Ukraine between around 6–14 August 2024. Claimed captured by Ukraine on 15 August 2024. Contested by Russia by 11 March 2025. Recaptured by Russia by 12 March 2025.
Tyotkino	3,852	Glushkovsky	Contested	7 May 2025	See also: 2025 Tyotkino incursion Contested by Ukraine from 7 May 2025. On Russia control by 15 June 2025.

== Timeline ==
=== 2022 (since Kherson withdrawal) ===
November
Russia recaptured Pavlivka, Donetsk Oblast between 11–14 November 2022.
Russia recaptured (Note: Previously captured by the DPR during the War in Donbas) Opytne, Donetsk Oblast between 11–17 November 2022.
Russia recaptured Ozarianivka, Donetsk Oblast between 27–28 November 2022.
Russia recaptured Zelenopillia, Donetsk Oblast around 28 November 2022.
Russia recaptured Andriivka, Donetsk Oblast between around 28 November – 1 December 2022.
Russia recaptured Novoselivske, Luhansk Oblast by around 29 November 2022.
Russia recaptured Kurdiumivka, Donetsk Oblast around 30 November 2022.

December
Russia recaptured Dorozhnianka, Zaporizhzhia Oblast between 31 December 2022 – 2 January 2023.

=== 2023 ===
January
Russia recaptured Soledar, Donetsk Oblast on 16 January 2023.
Russia recaptured Sakko i Vantsetti, Donetsk Oblast on 31 January 2023.

February
Russia recaptured Dvorichne, Kharkiv Oblast on 10 February 2023.
Russia recaptured Krasna Hora, Donetsk Oblast on 11 February 2023.
Russia recaptured Lyman Pershyi, Kharkiv Oblast on 16 February 2023.
Russia recaptured Paraskoviivka, Donetsk Oblast on 18 February 2023.

May
Russia recaptured Bakhmut, Donetsk Oblast on 20 May 2023.

June
Ukraine recaptured Neskuchne, Donetsk Oblast on 10 June 2023.
Ukraine recaptured Blahodatne, Donetsk Oblast on 10 June 2023.
Ukraine recaptured Storozheve, Donetsk Oblast on 11 June 2023.
Ukraine recaptured Lobkove, Zaporizhzhia Oblast around 9–11+ June 2023.
Ukraine recaptured Levadne, Zaporizhzhia Oblast between 12–14 June 2023.
Ukraine recaptured Novodarivka, Zaporizhzhia Oblast around 11–14+ June 2023.
Ukraine recaptured Makarivka, Donetsk Oblast between 13–14 June 2023.
Ukraine recaptured Piatykhatky, Zaporizhzhia Oblast around 21–25+ June 2023.
Ukraine recaptured Rivnopil, Donetsk Oblast on 26 June 2023.

July
Russia recaptured Serhiivka, Luhansk Oblast on 25 July 2023.
Ukraine recaptured Staromaiorske, Donetsk Oblast between 27–28 July 2023.

August
Russia recaptured Novoselivske, Luhansk Oblast on 5 August 2023.
Ukraine recaptured Urozhaine, Donetsk Oblast between 15–16 August 2023.

September
Ukraine recaptured Robotyne, Zaporizhzhia Oblast between 28 August – 1 September 2023.
Ukraine recaptured Andriivka, Donetsk Oblast between 14–15 September 2023.
Ukraine recaptured Klishchiivka, Donetsk Oblast between 17–22 September 2023.

October
Ukraine recaptured Poima, Kherson Oblast on 17 October 2023.
Russia recaptured Poima, Kherson Oblast on 18 October 2023.

November
Russia recaptured Khromove, Donetsk Oblast on 29 November 2023.

December
Russia recaptured Marinka, Donetsk Oblast on 24–25 December 2023.

=== 2024 ===
January
Russia recaptured Vesele, Donetsk Oblast on 18 January 2024.
Russia recaptured Krokhmalne, Kharkiv Oblast on 20 January 2024.
Russia recaptured Tabaivka, Kharkiv Oblast on 27 January 2024.

February
Russia recaptured Avdiivka, Donetsk Oblast on 17 February 2024.
Russia recaptured Pobieda, Donetsk Oblast on 21 February 2024.
Russia recaptured Stepove, Donetsk Oblast around 23 February 2024.
Russia recaptured Lastochkyne, Donetsk Oblast on 24 February 2024.
Russia recaptured Sieverne, Donetsk Oblast between 22–26 February 2024.

March
Russia recaptured Orlivka, Donetsk Oblast between around 29 February – 19 March 2024.
Russia fully recaptured Tonenke, Donetsk Oblast by 21 March 2024.
Russia recaptured Nevelske, Donetsk Oblast around 12 March 2024.
Russia recaptured Ivanivske, Donetsk Oblast around 23 March 2024.

April
Russia fully recaptured Vodiane, Donetsk Oblast between 31 March – 5 April 2024.
Russia recaptured Bohdanivka, Donetsk Oblast on 8 April 2024.
Russia recaptured Pervomaiske, Donetsk Oblast around 9 April 2024.
Russia captured Novomykhailivka, Donetsk Oblast around 22 April 2024.
Russia recaptured Novobakhmutivka, Donetsk Oblast on 24 April 2024.
Russia recaptured Soloviove, Donetsk Oblast on 25 April 2024.
Russia recaptured Semenivka, Donetsk Oblast between around 20–26 April 2024.
Russia recaptured Berdychi, Donetsk Oblast between around 20–27 April 2024.
Russia recaptured Novokalynove, Donetsk Oblast around 27 April 2024.
Russia fully recaptured Ocheretyne, Donetsk Oblast around 30 April 2024.

May
Russia fully recaptured Keramik, Donetsk Oblast between around 28 April – 3 May 2024.
Russia recaptured Arkhanhelske, Donetsk Oblast on 3 May 2024.
Ukraine recaptured Nevelske, Donetsk Oblast before 4 May 2024.
Russia recaptured Kotliarivka, Kharkiv Oblast on 4 May 2024.
Russia recaptured Kyslivka, Kharkiv Oblast around 6 May 2024.
Russia recaptured Pylna, Kharkiv Oblast on 10 May 2024.
Russia recaptured Strilecha, Kharkiv Oblast on 10 May 2024.
Russia recaptured Borysivka, Kharkiv Oblast on 10 May 2024.
Russia recaptured Krasne, Kharkiv Raion on 10 May 2024.
Russia recaptured Pletenivka, Kharkiv Oblast around 10 May 2024.
Russia recaptured Ohirtseve, Kharkiv Oblast around 10 May 2024.
Russia recaptured Hatyshche, Kharkiv Oblast between around 10–11 May 2024.
Russia recaptured Morokhovets, Kharkiv Oblast on 11 May 2024.
Russia recaptured Oliinykove, Kharkiv Oblast on 11 May 2024.
Russia recaptured Hlyboke, Kharkiv Oblast between 11–13 May 2024.
Russia recaptured Lukiantsi, Kharkiv Oblast on 13 May 2024.
Russia recaptured Buhruvatka, Kharkiv Oblast on 14 May 2024.
Russia recaptured Netailove, Donetsk Oblast between around 18–20 May 2024.
Russia recaptured Umanske, Donetsk Oblast around 20 May 2024.
Russia recaptured Robotyne, Zaporizhzhia Oblast around 20 May 2024.
Russia recaptured Andriivka, Donetsk Oblast on 23 May 2024.
Russia recaptured Klishchiivka, Donetsk Oblast between around late – 17 May June 2024.

June
Russia recaptured Ivanivka, Kharkiv Oblast between around 25 May – 6 June 2024.
Russia recaptured Heorhiivka, Donetsk Oblast between around 5–14 June 2024.
Russia captured Paraskoviivka, Donetsk Oblast between around 5–14 June 2024.
Russia likely recaptured Staromaiorske, Donetsk Oblast on 10 June 2024.
Russia recaptured Novooleksandrivka, Donetsk Oblast around 10 June 2024.
Russia recaptured Novopokrovske, Donetsk Oblast between 12–13 June 2024.
Russia recaptured Shumy, Donetsk Oblast on 21 June 2024.
Russia captured Sokil, Donetsk Oblast between around 29 June – 6 July 2024.

July
Russia captured Voskhod, Donetsk Oblast between around 4–11 July 2024.
Russia captured Yevhenivka, Donetsk Oblast around 10 July 2024.
Russia recaptured Urozhaine, Donetsk Oblast on 13 July 2024.
Russia captured Spirne, Donetsk Oblast between around 30 June – 17 July 2024.
Russia captured Ivano-Daryivka, Donetsk Oblast around 17 July 2024.
Russia recaptured Krynky, Kherson Oblast around 18 July 2024.
Russia captured Prohres, Donetsk Oblast on 19 July 2024.
Russia recaptured Pishchane, Kharkiv Oblast on 20 July 2024.
Russia captured Yasnobrodivka, Donetsk Oblast between around 7–26 July 2024.
Russia captured Lozuvatske, Donetsk Oblast around 26 July 2024.
Russia captured Novoselivka Persha, Donetsk Oblast around 29 July 2024.

August
Russia captured Rozdolivka, Donetsk Oblast between around 19 July – 3 August 2024.
Russia captured Vesele, Donetsk Oblast between around 1–4 August 2024.
Russia captured Serhiivka, Donetsk Oblast around 7 August 2024.
Russia recaptured Nevelske, Donetsk Oblast on 9 August 2024.
Russia captured Ivanivka, Donetsk Oblast around 13 August 2024.
Russia captured Zhelanne, Donetsk Oblast around 14 August 2024.
Russia captured Orlivka, Donetsk Oblast on 14 August 2024.
Russia captured Mykolaivka, Donetsk Oblast between around 17–23 August 2024.
Russia captured Novozhelanne, Donetsk Oblast around 18 August 2024.
Russia captured Zavitne, Donetsk Oblast around 18 August 2024.
Russia captured Mezhove, Donetsk Oblast around 19 August 2024.
Russia captured Skuchne, Donetsk Oblast around 19 August 2024.
Russia captured Komyshivka, Donetsk Oblast around 21 August 2024.
Russia captured Ptyche, Donetsk Oblast on 22 August 2024.
Russia captured Kalynove, Donetsk Oblast on 27 August 2024.
Russia captured Novohrodivka, Donetsk Oblast on 27 August 2024.
Russia captured Kostiantynivka, Donetsk Oblast on 27 August 2024.
Russia recaptured Stelmakhivka, Luhansk Oblast on 30 August 2024.
Russia captured Karlivka, Donetsk Oblast around 30 August 2024.

September
Russia captured Mykhailivka, Donetsk Oblast around 1 September 2024.
Russia captured Halytsynivka, Donetsk Oblast around 3 September 2024.
Russia captured Prechystivka, Donetsk Oblast around 3 September 2024.
Russia captured Pivdenne, Donetsk Oblast between around 30 July – 5 September 2024.
Russia captured Zalizne, Donetsk Oblast between around 19 August – 5 September 2024.
Russia recaptured Synkivka, Kharkiv Oblast on 6 September 2024.
Russia captured Vodiane, Donetsk Oblast on 8 September 2024.
Russia captured Krasnohorivka, Donetsk Oblast on 9 September 2024.
Russia captured Ukrainsk, Donetsk Oblast on 17 September 2024.
Russia captured Pivnichne, Donetsk Oblast by 21 September 2024.
Russia recaptured Krutyi Yar, Donetsk Oblast around 29 September 2024.
Russia captured New York, Donetsk Oblast in September 2024.

October
Russia captured Vuhledar, Donetsk Oblast on 1 October 2024.
Russia recaptured Andriivka, Luhansk Oblast by 4 October 2024.
Russia captured Tsukuryne, Donetsk Oblast around 6 October 2024.
Russia recaptured Miasozharivka, Luhansk Oblast around 7 October 2024.
Russia recaptured Verkhniokamianske, Donetsk Oblast around 7 October 2024.
Russia captured Zhelanne Pershe, Donetsk Oblast by 7 October 2024.
Russia captured Mykolaivka, Donetsk Oblast around 10 October 2024.
Russia captured Ostrivske, Donetsk Oblast by 15 October 2024.
Russia recaptured Makiivka, Luhansk Oblast around 16 October 2024.
Russia recaptured Nevske, Luhansk Oblast by 16 October 2024.
Russia captured Nelipivka, Donetsk Oblast by 18 October 2024.
Russia captured Zhelanne Druhe, Donetsk Oblast by 19 October 2024.
Russia captured Maksymilianivka, Donetsk Oblast by 20 October 2024.
Russia captured Hrodivka, Donetsk Oblast by 21 October 2024.
Russia recaptured Novosadove, Donetsk Oblast on 22 October 2024.
Russia captured Izmailivka, Donetsk Oblast on 23 October 2024.
Russia recaptured Levadne, Zaporizhzhia Oblast by 26 October 2024.
Russia captured Bohoiavlenka, Donetsk Oblast on 27 October 2024.
Russia captured Hirnyk, Donetsk Oblast on 27 October 2024.
Russia captured Novoukrainka, Donetsk Oblast on 29 October 2024.
Russia captured Selydove, Donetsk Oblast around 30 October 2024.
Russia captured Zoriane, Donetsk Oblast around 30 October 2024.
Russia captured Kurakhivka, Donetsk Oblast around 31 October 2024.
Russia recaptured Kruhliakivka, Kharkiv Oblast around 31 October 2024.

November
Russia captured Yasna Poliana, Donetsk Oblast around 1 November 2024.
Russia captured Shakhtarske, Donetsk Oblast around 2 November 2024.
Russia captured Maksymivka, Donetsk Oblast on 2 November 2024.
Russia captured Katerynivka, Donetsk Oblast around 3 November 2024.
Russia captured Druzhba, Donetsk Oblast by 5 November 2024.
Russia captured Novooleksiivka, Donetsk Oblast on 7 November 2024.
Russia captured Illinka, Donetsk Oblast on 13 November 2024.
Russia captured Rivnopil, Donetsk Oblast around 14 November 2024.
Russia recaptured Berestove, Kharkiv Oblast by 15 November 2024.
Russia captured Kalynivka, Donetsk Oblast by 18 November 2024.
Russia captured Dalne, Donetsk Oblast around 21 November 2024.
Russia captured Rozdolne, Donetsk Oblast on 29 November 2024.
Russia captured Zhovte, Donetsk Oblast on 29 November 2024.

December
Russia recaptured Blahodatne, Donetsk Oblast on 5 December 2024.
Russia captured Novotroitske, Donetsk Oblast around 10 December 2024.
Russia captured Uspenivka, Donetsk Oblast on 13 December 2024.
Russia captured Shevchenko, Donetsk Oblast around 15 December 2024.
Russia captured Sontsivka, Donetsk Oblast on 17 December 2024.
Russia captured Novyi Komar, Donetsk Oblast on 19 December 2024.
Russia recaptured Makarivka, Donetsk Oblast around 23 December 2024.
Russia recaptured Storozheve, Donetsk Oblast around 24 December 2024.
Russia recaptured Lozova, Kharkiv Oblast around 24 December 2024.
Russia captured Kurakhove, Donetsk Oblast on 25 December 2024.
Russia captured Novoielyzavetivka, Donetsk Oblast around 31 December 2024.

=== 2025 ===
January
Russia captured Vozdvyzhenka, Donetsk Oblast on 1 January 2025.
Russia captured Novomlynsk, Kharkiv Oblast in early January 2025.
Russia captured Hryhorivka, Donetsk Oblast before 11 January 2025.
Russia recaptured Neskuchne, Donetsk Oblast around 13 January 2025.
Russia captured Pishchane, Donetsk Oblast around 13 January 2025.
Russia captured Vremivka, Donetsk Oblast on 17 January 2025.
Russia recaptured Terny, Donetsk Oblast by 19 January 2025.
Russia captured Uspenivka, Donetsk Oblast by 28 January 2025.
Russia captured Dvorichna, Kharkiv Oblast by 28 January 2025.
Russia captured Velyka Novosilka, Donetsk Oblast by 28 January 2025.

February
Russia recaptured Zapadne, Kharkiv Oblast by 5 February 2025.
Russia recaptured Fyholivka, Kharkiv Oblast on 6 February 2025.
Russia captured Dachne, Donetsk Oblast on 6 February 2025.
Russia captured Baranivka, Donetsk Oblast by 11 February 2025.
Russia captured Novoocheretuvate, Donetsk Oblast on 20 February 2025.
Russia captured Ulakly, Donetsk Oblast on 21 February 2025.
Russia recaptured Bilohorivka, Luhansk Oblast on 23 February 2025.
Russia captured Andriivka, Donetsk Oblast by 25 February 2025.

March
Russia captured Noven'ke, Sumy Oblast on 8 March 2025.
Russia captured Kostyantynopil, Donetsk Oblast on 9 March 2025.
Russia captured Dniproenerhiia, Donetsk Oblast on 12 March 2025.
Russia captured Topoli, Kharkiv Oblast on 23 March 2025.
Russia recaptured Piatykhatky, Zaporizhzhia Oblast on 25 March 2025.
Russia captured Veselivka, Sumy Oblast on 30 March 2025.

April
Russia captured Basivka, Sumy Oblast on 9 April 2025.
Russia captured Sukha Balka, Donetsk Oblast on 23 April 2025.
Russia captured Kostiantynopil, Donetsk Oblast on 29 April 2025

June
Russia captured Zelene Pole, Donetsk Oblast on 1 June 2025
Russia captured Kindrativka, Sumy Oblast on 16 June 2025.
Russia captured Komar, Donetsk Oblast on 22 June 2025.

August
Russia captured Toretsk, Donetsk Oblast in early August 2025.
Russia captured Chasiv Yar, Donetsk Oblast in early August 2025.
Russia captured Plavni, Zaporizhzhia Oblast on 28 August 2025.

December
Russia recaptured Siversk, Donetsk Oblast on 20 December 2025.

=== 2026 ===
January
Russia captured Pokrovsk, Donetsk Oblast in late January 2026.
February
Russia captured Myrnohrad, Donetsk Oblast in early February 2026.
Russia captured Huliaipole, Zaporizhzhia Oblast in early February 2026.
March
Ukraine recaptured Stepove, Dnipropetrovsk Oblast around early March 2026.
Ukraine recaptured Ternove, Dnipropetrovsk Oblast in early March 2026.
Ukraine recaptured Kalynivske, Velykomykhailivka rural hromada, Synelnykove Raion, Dnipropetrovsk Oblast in early March 2026.
Ukraine recaptured Minkivka, Donetsk Oblast mid-March 2026.
April
Ukraine recaptured Andriivka, Sumy Raion mid-April 2026.
July
Ukraine recaptured Novopavlivka, Dnipropetrovsk Oblast.
August
Ukraine recaptured Nove, Donetsk Oblast.
Ukraine recaptured Katerynivka, Donetsk Oblast.

=== Timeline of total controlled territory ===
The following table summarizes some estimates of the total area of Ukrainian territory under Russian control, presented by various publishers at different instances during the conflict. Note that some of the estimates from the end of 2022 were conflicting.

Amount of Ukrainian territory under Russian control during the conflict
Date	Area under Russian control (km^{2})	Percentage of Ukrainian territory (%)	Source
20 February 2019	44,000	7.3%	Petro Poroshenko, UN
29 December 2021	43,133	7.12%	CIA World Factbook
22 February 2022	42,000	7.0%	CNN
28 February 2022	119,000	20%	CNN
22 March 2022	163,000	27%	CNN
8 April 2022	114,000	19%	CNN
2 June 2022	119,000	20%	Volodymyr Zelenskyy
31 August 2022	125,000	21%	CNN
11 September 2022	116,000	19%	CNN
26 September 2022	116,000	19%	CNN
11 November 2022	119,000	20%	CNN
14 November 2022	109,000	18%	NY Times
23 February 2023	109,000	18%	Belfer center
25 September 2023	109,000 (518 km^{2} more than in December 2022)	18%	NY Times (on ISW data)
20 May 2024	109,000	18%	Center for Preventive Action
2 September 2024	110,000–111,000 (1,730 km^{2} more than in December 2023)	18%	AFP (on ISW data)
28 October 2025	117,143 (7,143 km^{2} more than in September 2024)	19%	Belfer Center

== See also ==
- List of cities in Ukraine
- List of military engagements during the Russian invasion of Ukraine
- List of urban-type settlements in Ukraine
- Timeline of geopolitical changes (2000–present)
- Timeline of the Russian invasion of Ukraine
- Template:Russo-Ukrainian War detailed map
- Template:Russo-Ukrainian War detailed relief map
