= 272nd Motor Rifle Regiment =

Motor Rifle Regiment of Russia

46th Motorised Rifle Division (1957-1964) 272nd Motorised Rifle Division (1964-1989) 128th Machine-Gun Artillery Division (1989-1993) 173rd Mobile Fortress Brigade (1993-1997) 128th Machine-Gun Artillery Division (1997-2009) 69th Independent Fortress Brigade (2009-N/A) 272nd Motor Rifle Regiment (2022-present)
- 272-й мотострелковый полк
- Active: 1957–present
- Country: USSR (until 1991); Russia
- Branch: Soviet Army (until 1991); Russian Ground Forces
- Type: Mechanized infantry
- Size: Regiment
- Part of: Moscow Military District, 1st Guards Tank Army, 47th Tank Division
- Garrison/HQ: Babstovo; MUN 36994
- Engagements: Russian Invasion of Ukraine: 2024 Kharkiv offensive; 2024 Kursk offensive; Kupiansk offensive

The 272nd Motor Rifle Regiment (Russian: 272-й мотострелковый полк), is an active regiment of the Russian Ground Forces. It is a part of the Moscow Military District, the 1st Guards Tank Army and the 47th Tank Division.

== History ==
The Russian Regiment was activated on June 25, 1957, as the 46th Motorised Rifle Division, from the 46th Rifle Division. The Garrison/HQ of the regiment at the time was at Kursk, Kursk Oblast. On November 17, 1964, the regiment was renamed as the 272nd Motorised Rifle Division. In June 1967 the Garrison/HQ of the regiment was moved to Birobidzhan, Jewish Autonomous Oblast. In June 1978 the Garrison/HQ was moved to Babstovo, Jewish Autonomous Oblast, all units where to be moved from Birobidzhan to Babstovo. On June 27, 1989, the regiment was renamed as the 128th Machine-Gun Artillery Division. On February 2, 1993, the regiment was renamed as the 173rd Mobile Fortress Brigade. On March 12, 1997, the regiment was renamed as the 128th Machine-Gun Artillery Division. On June 1, 2009, the regiment was renamed as the 69th independent Fortress Brigade.

=== Russian Invasion of Ukraine ===
In November 2023, the regiment operated in the direction of Stelmakhivka, Svatove Raion, Lugansk Oblast. At the end of January 2024, the regiment operated in the area of Tabaevka and Krokhmalne, Kupiansk Raion, and both villages were captured by the 47th Tank Division. In May 2024, according to the ISW, units of the regiment operated near Vovchansk.

== Subordination ==
- 13th Guards Army Corps - 1957 - 1967
- 51st Combined Arms Army - 1967 - 1969
- 43rd Army Corps - 1969 - 1989
- 35th Combined Arms Army - 1989 - 2022
- 47th Tank Division - 2022–present

== See also ==
- Western Military District
- 1st Guards Tank Army
- 47th Tank Division
