= Zherebets =

Zherebets (Ukrainian: Жеребець, lit. 'stallion') may have multiple meanings:

- Zherebets (river), a river in eastern Ukraine
- Zherebets Lake in Kazakhstan
- Tavriiske, Zaporizhzhia Raion, Zaporizhzhia Oblast, a village in southern Ukraine formerly known as Zherebets until 1939
