= Synkivka =

Village in Kharkiv Oblast, Ukraine

Synkivka Синьківка
- Village
- Interactive map of Synkivka
- Location within Kharkiv Oblast Location within Ukraine
- Coordinates: 49°45′47″N 37°42′20″E
- Country: Ukraine
- Oblast: Kharkiv Oblast
- Raion: Kupiansk Raion
- Founded: 1872

Government
  - Type: Petropavlivka rural hromada

Area
  - Total: 1.245 km^{2} (0.481 sq mi)
- Elevation: 91 m (299 ft)

Population (2001 census)
  - Total: 392
  - Density: 315/km^{2} (815/sq mi)
- Civilian population has been evacuated during the Russian invasion
- Time zone: UTC+2 (EET)
  - Summer (DST): UTC+3 (EEST)
- Postal code: 63722
- Area code: +380 5742
- KOATUU code: 6323785503
- KATOTTH code: UA63080130130078227

Synkivka (Ukrainian: Синьківка, Russian: Синьковка, romanized: Sinkovka) is a village in Kupiansk Raion, Kharkiv Oblast, Ukraine. During the first days of the Russian invasion of Ukraine, the village was captured by Russian forces in their initial advance into the nation. After the successful 2022 Ukrainian eastern counteroffensive in September, however, the village returned to Ukrainian control.

On 16 February 2023, Russian forces reportedly entered the village Lyman Pershyi to the north, making Synkivka a frontline settlement. Since then, three local Russian offensives aimed at recapturing the village took place in August, November, and December 2023. Each of the assaults have been unsuccessful, however, consistent shelling has rendered the village void of civilians as of September 2023. In September 2024, Russia managed to recapture the village.

== Geography ==
The village is separated 3 km (1.9 mi) from the left bank of the Oskil river by a pine forest. The closest village to the settlement, Lyman Pershyi is located 2 km (1.2 mi) upstream. The Synkivka station is located on the right of the village, connecting the village to the larger rail lines nearby.

== History ==
According to the 2001 census, the village had a population of 392 people.

On 12 June 2020; Decree No. 725-r of the Cabinet of Ministers of Ukraine placed the village in the administration of the Petropavlivka rural hromada, and on 17 July became part of the redistricted Kupiansk Raion as a result of the administrative-territorial reform.

=== Russian invasion of Ukraine ===
At the beginning of the Russian invasion of Ukraine in February 2022, Synkivka was occupied by Russian forces during their initial advance into the nation. In September 2022, the village was retaken by Ukraine after their successful 2022 Kharkiv counteroffensive, which pushed Russian forces past the Oskil river in the area bordering the village. This advance was further supported by an update to DeepStateMap.Live on 20 November claiming the same thing.

The situation later changed after the Russian recapture of Lyman Pershyi on 16 February 2023, the result of which made the village a frontline settlement. In August, the first localized Russian offensive took place with the aim of recapturing the village. The attacks would culminate on 20 August after a Russian post on Telegram announced their recapture of the village, providing video of a Russian convey supposedly driving through the village to support their claims. The Ukrainian Armed Forces immediately dismissed the claims, and the following day, the footage of the Russian convoy was geolocated and debunked as being from Voronove, Luhansk Oblast in 2014. According to another Telegram post supported by previous Russian claims: the assaults on the village would end after Russian forces lost an estimated 150 infantry, "two T-72 tanks, three armored vehicles, a D-30 howitzer, a mortar, and a command and observation post."

Russian attacks and shelling continued intermittently on the village in September and October, leading Ukraine to evacuate the final five residents from the village on 29 September 2023.

From middle to late November, the second Russian localized assault on the village took place. Beginning with shelling, four Russian assaults took place on or near the village on 17 November. On 26 November, head of public relations of the Ukrainian Ground Forces Volodymyr Fitio claimed that 758 artillery strikes had been carried out by Russian forces on or near the village during the assaults. Fitio further claimed, though, that no strategic success was made by Russian forces during the assaults, and that they had lost a further 158 infantry and 39 pieces of military equipment in their attempts to recapture the village.

From middle to late December, a third localized Russian assault took place on the village. On 11 December, commander of the Ukrainian Ground Forces Oleksandr Syrskyi announced on Telegram that multiple Russian assault companies had been used in the past days to try to recapture the village, but that severe losses had forced them to call up reserves to continue the assaults. On 15 December, this claim was supported by combat footage of a Russian armored assault group consisting of at least nine armored vehicles with infantry on the outskirts of the village being attacked by Ukrainian forces, resulting in the loss of five of the Russian vehicles. On 16 December, the General Staff of the Ukrainian Armed Forces reported that a further 11 Russian assaults on the village had been repelled.

Continued fighting in 2024 resulted in a Russian recapture of the village on 6 September 2024.

== See also ==
Nearby settlements

- Lyman Pershyi
- Vilshana
- Holubivka
- Petropavlivka
