= Balka Zhuravka =

Balka Zhuravka Балка Журавка
- Village
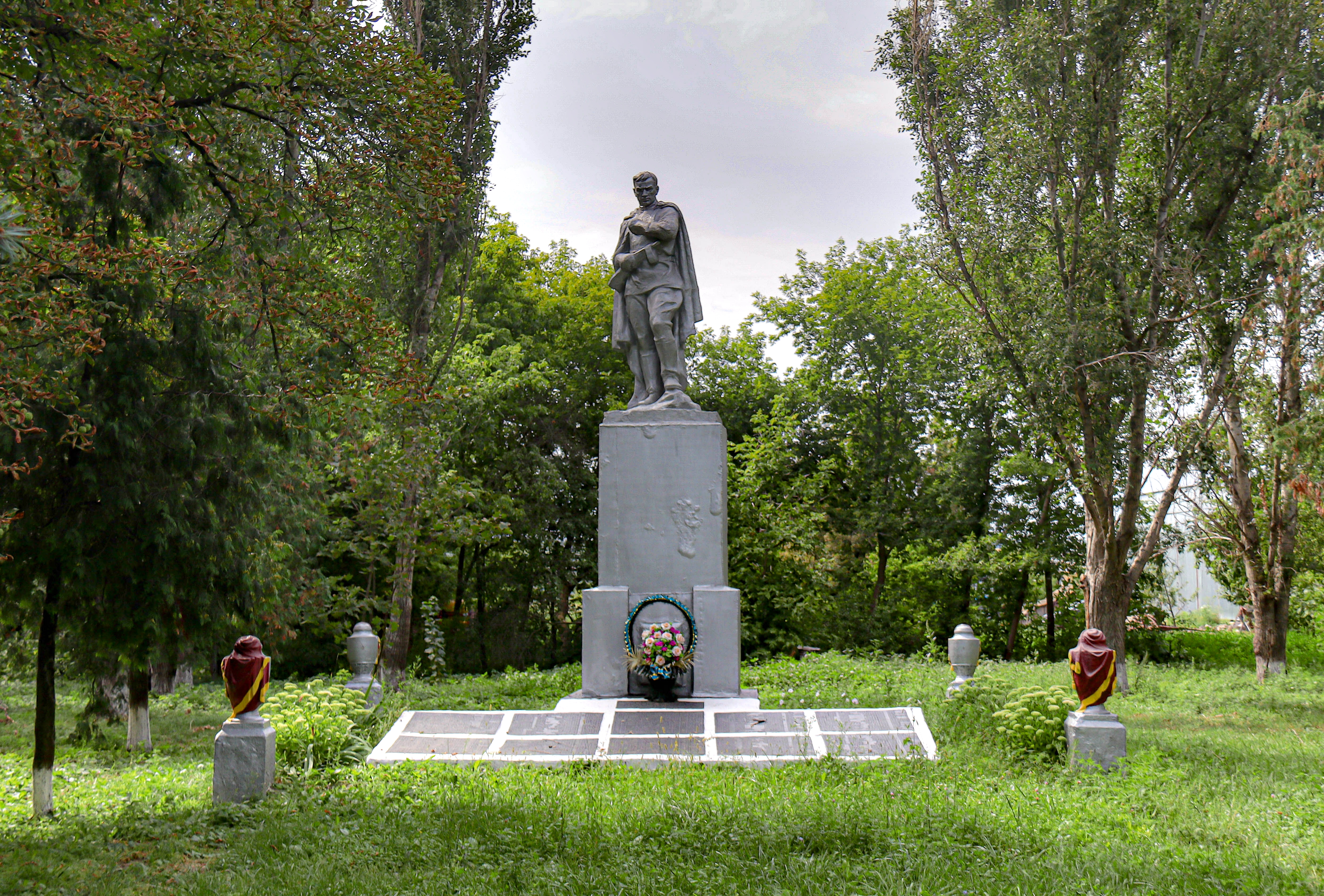
- A memorial
- Interactive map of Balka Zhuravka
- Location of Balka Zhuravka within Ukraine Balka Zhuravka (Luhansk Oblast)
- Coordinates: 49°09′32″N 37°58′30″E
- Country: Ukraine
- Oblast: Luhansk Oblast
- Raion: Svatove Raion
- Hromada: Krasnorichenske settlement hromada
- Founded: 1720

Area
  - Total: 2.85 km^{2} (1.10 sq mi)
- Elevation: 75 m (246 ft)

Population (2001 census)
  - Total: 729
  - Density: 256/km^{2} (662/sq mi)
- Time zone: UTC+2 (EET)
  - Summer (DST): UTC+3 (EEST)
- Postal code: 92917
- Area code: +380 6454
- KATOTTH: UA44100050060052037

Balka Zhuravka (Ukrainian: Балка Журавка; formerly known as Nevske (Невське)) is a village in Krasnorichenske settlement hromada, Svatove Raion, Luhansk Oblast, eastern Ukraine. It is located 117.76 kilometres (73.17 mi) northwest (NW) from the centre of Luhansk city.

== Geography ==
On the southwestern outskirts of the village, the Zhuravka Balka River flows into the Zherebets River. The absolute height is 75 metres above sea level.

== History ==
Date of foundation — 1720.

=== Russian invasion of Ukraine ===
The village was initially captured by Russian forces in March 2022 during the full-scale Russian invasion of Ukraine and was recaptured by Ukraine in October 2022 during the immediate aftermath of the 2022 Kharkiv counteroffensive. Over the course of Russian offensives along the Svatove-Kreminna front, it was again captured by Russian forces in October 2024.

== Demographics ==
As of the 2001 Ukrainian census, the settlement had 729 inhabitants, whose native languages were 96.70% Ukrainian and 3.16% Russian.
