= Krasnorichenske settlement hromada =

Krasnorichenske settlement hromada Красноріченська селищна громада
- Hromada
- Interactive map of Krasnorichenske settlement hromada
- Country: Ukraine
- Oblast: Luhansk
- Raion: Svatove

Government
  - Head: Serhiy Anatoliyovich Hlushchenko

Area
  - Total: 443.0 km^{2} (171.0 sq mi)

Population (2020)
  - Total: 7,977
  - Density: 18.01/km^{2} (46.64/sq mi)
- Settlements: 10
- Villages: 9
- Towns: 1

Krasnorichenske settlement hromada (Ukrainian: Красноріченська селищна громада) is a hromada of Ukraine, located in Svatove Raion, Luhansk Oblast. Its administrative center is the town of Krasnorichenske.

It has an area of 443.0 square kilometres (171.0 mi^{2}) and a population of 7,977, as of 2020.

The hromada contains 10 settlements: 1 town (Krasnorichenske) and 9 villages:

- Balka Zhuravka
- Baranykivka
- Hrekivka
- Zalyman
- Makiivka
- Novovodiane
- Novoliubivka
- Novooleksandrivka
- Ploshanka

== Demographics ==
As of the 2001 Ukrainian census, the municipality had a population of 11,464 people. The population is overwhelmingly Ukrainophone, while only less than 8% of the population speaks a different native language.

Native languages in the Krasnorichenske settlement hromada
Languages	percent
Ukrainian	92.3%
Russian	7.4%
Belarusian	0.2%
others	0.2%

== See also ==
- List of hromadas of Ukraine
