= Hatyshche, Kharkiv Oblast =

Settlement in Kharkiv Oblast, Ukraine

Hatyshche Гатище
- Village
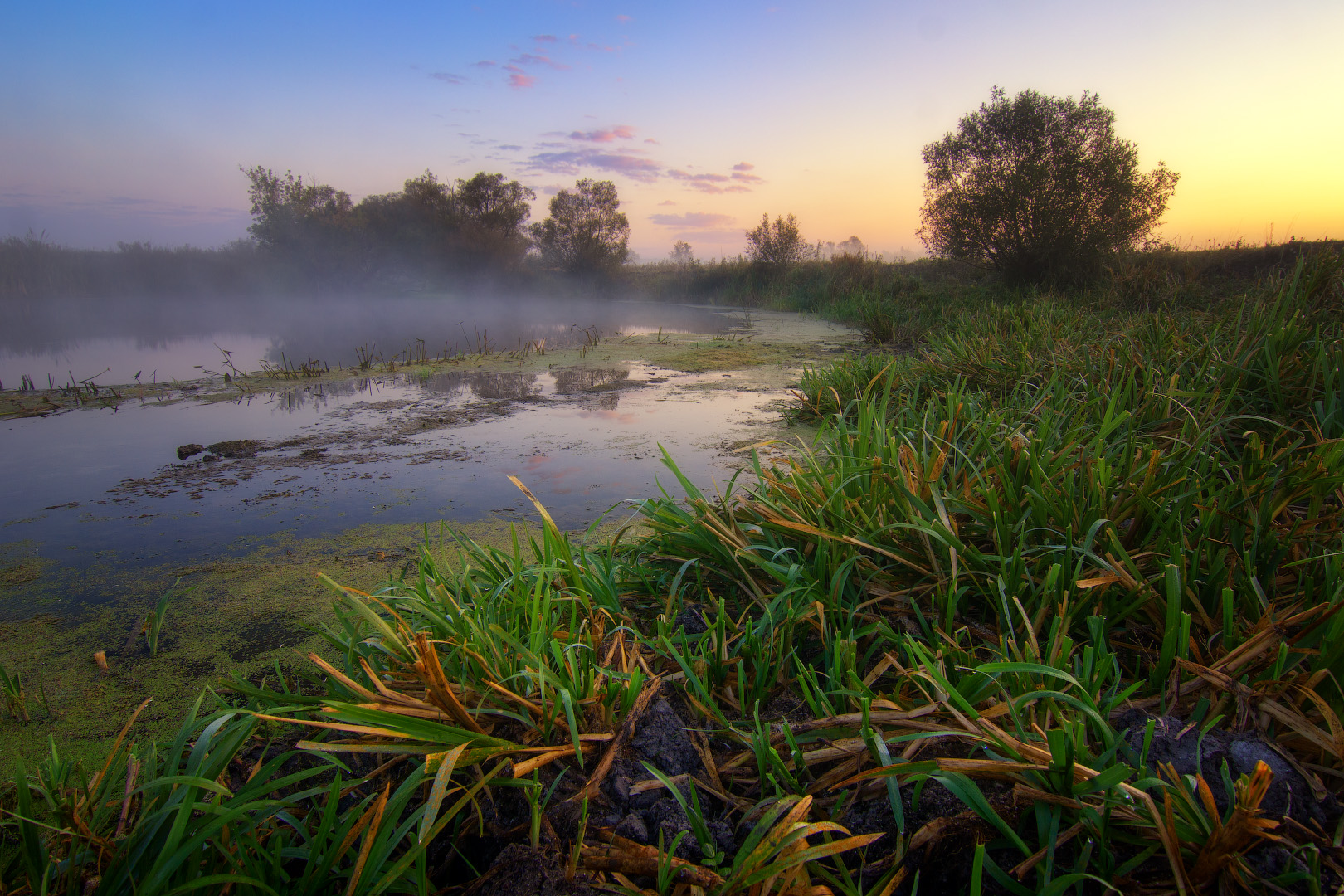
- Vovcha
- Interactive map of Hatyshche
- Location of Morokhovets within Ukraine Hatyshche (Ukraine)
- Coordinates: 50.303333°N 36.866389°E
- Country: Ukraine
- Oblast: Kharkiv Oblast
- Raion: Chuhuiv Raion
- Hromada: Vovchansk urban hromada
- Founded: 1625

Area
  - Total: 0.109 km^{2} (0.042 sq mi)
- Elevation: 114 m (374 ft)

Population (2001 census)
  - Total: 509
  - Density: 4,670/km^{2} (12,100/sq mi)
- Time zone: UTC+2 (EET)
  - Summer (DST): UTC+3 (EEST)
- Postal code: 62509
- Area code: +380 5741

Hatyshche (Ukrainian: Гатище; Russian: Гатище) is a village in Chuhuiv Raion (district) in Kharkiv Oblast of eastern Ukraine, located 52.04 kilometres (32.34 mi) northeast of Kharkiv city. It belongs to Vovchansk urban hromada, one of the hromadas of Ukraine.

== Geography ==
The village is located on the left bank of the Siverskyi Donets River at the confluence of the Vovcha River, 2 kilometres (1.2 mi) upstream of the Vovcha River is the town of Vovchansk, on the opposite bank of the Siverskyi Donets River is the village of Ohirtseve. There are large forests (pine, oak) around the village with a large number of recreation camps and holiday homes.

The border with Russia is 2 kilometres (1.2 mi) away.

== Demographics ==
As of the 2001 Ukrainian census, the settlement had 509 inhabitants. Their native languages were 54.03% Ukrainian, 42.04% Russian, 0.34% Romanian (self-declared), 0.39% Belarusian and 0.20% Moldovan (Romanian).

== History ==
Since May 2024, the settlement has been under Russian Occupation.
