= Kotliarivka, Kharkiv Oblast =

Settlement in Kharkiv Oblast, Ukraine

Kotliarivka Котлярівка
- Village
- Interactive map of Kotliarivka
- Location of Kotliarivka within Ukraine Kotliarivka (Ukraine)
- Coordinates: 49.630556°N 37.906667°E
- Country: Ukraine
- Oblast Region: Kharkiv Oblast
- Raion: Kupiansk Raion
- Hromada: Petropavlivka rural hromada
- Founded: 1711

Area
  - Total: 0.75 km^{2} (0.29 sq mi)
- Elevation: 150 m (490 ft)

Population (2001 census)
  - Total: 251
  - Density: 330/km^{2} (870/sq mi)
- Time zone: UTC+2 (EET)
  - Summer (DST): UTC+3 (EEST)
- Postal code: 63742
- Area code: +380 5742

Kotliarivka (Ukrainian: Котлярівка; Russian: Котляровка) is a village in Kupiansk Raion (district) in Kharkiv Oblast of eastern Ukraine, located 121.87 kilometres (75.73 mi) east-southeast (ESE) of the centre of Kharkiv city. It belongs to Petropavlivka rural hromada, one of the hromadas of Ukraine.

== History ==
Date of foundation — 1711.

=== Russian Invasion, from 2022 ===
Russian forces claimed control over the village on 6 May 2024, the claim has not yet been confirmed by the Ukrainian side. However, Pro-Ukrainian DeepstateUA claimed the capture of Kotlyarivka by the Russian Military was on 4 May.

== Demographics ==
As of the 2001 Ukrainian census, the settlement had 251 inhabitants. Their native languages were 92.94% Ukrainian, 6.67% Russian and 0.39% Belarusian.
