= Makiivka, Luhansk Oblast =

Village in Luhansk Oblast, Ukraine

Makiivka Макіївка
- Village
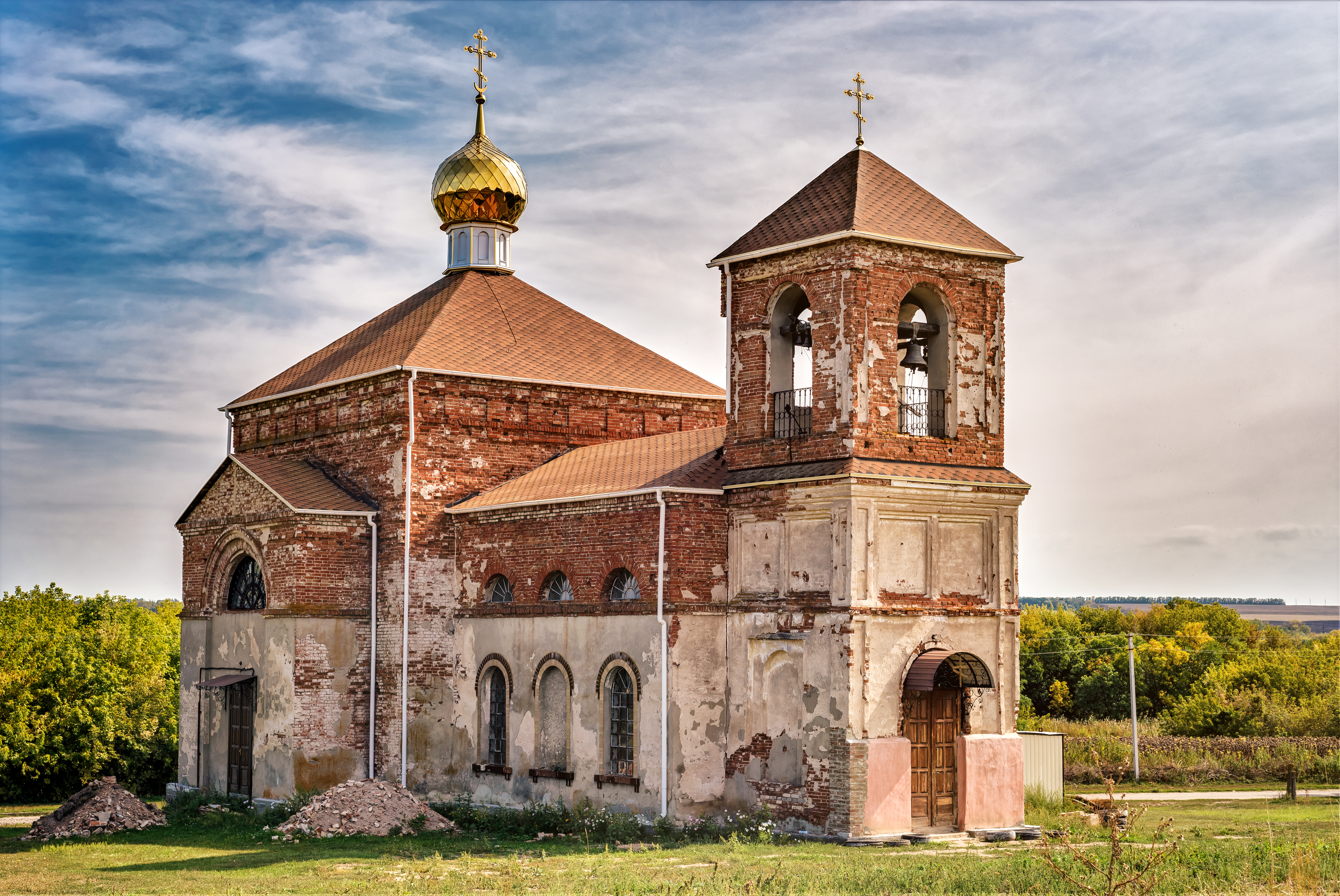
- Saints Peter and Paul Church
- Interactive map of Makiivka
- Location of Makiivka in Luhansk Oblast Makiivka (Ukraine)
- Coordinates: 49°13′37″N 37°59′09″E
- Country: Ukraine
- Oblast: Luhansk Oblast
- Raion: Svatove Raion
- Hromada: Krasnorichenske settlement hromada
- Founded: 1705

Government
  - Mayor: Halyna Hlobchasta
- Elevation: 78 m (256 ft)

Population (2024)
  - Total: 0
- Time zone: UTC+2 (EET)
  - Summer (DST): UTC+3 (EEST)
- Postal code: 92911
- Area code: +380 6454

Makiivka (Ukrainian: Макіївка; Russian: Макеевка, romanized: Makeyevka) is a village in Svatove Raion, Luhansk Oblast, eastern Ukraine. It is located about 121.4 kilometres (75.4 mi) northwest of the centre of the city of Luhansk. It belongs to Krasnorichenske settlement hromada, one of the hromadas of Ukraine.

== History ==
The village was captured by Russian forces during the Russian invasion of Ukraine, with Ukrainian forces entering it in the beginning of October the same year. The regional military administration reported on 13 November that the settlement was under Ukrainian control.

Russia claimed to have recaptured the village on 29 September 2024, which was confirmed in mid-October by a Ukrainian source.

== Demographics ==
As of the 2001 Ukrainian census, the village had 819 inhabitants. The native languages composition was:

Native languages in Makiivka
	percent
Ukrainian	94.5%
Russian	5.3%
Hungarian	0.2%

== See also ==
- Makiivka surrender incident
