= Krasnorichenske =

Urban locality in Luhansk Oblast, Ukraine

Krasnorichenske Красноріченське
- Rural settlement
- Location of Krasnorichenske in Luhansk Oblast Location of Krasnorichenske in Ukraine
- Coordinates: 49°12′37″N 38°12′27″E
- Country: Ukraine
- Oblast: Luhansk Oblast
- Raion: Svatove Raion
- Elevation: 75 m (246 ft)

Population (2022)
  - Total: 3,755
- Postal code: 92913
- Area code: +380 6454

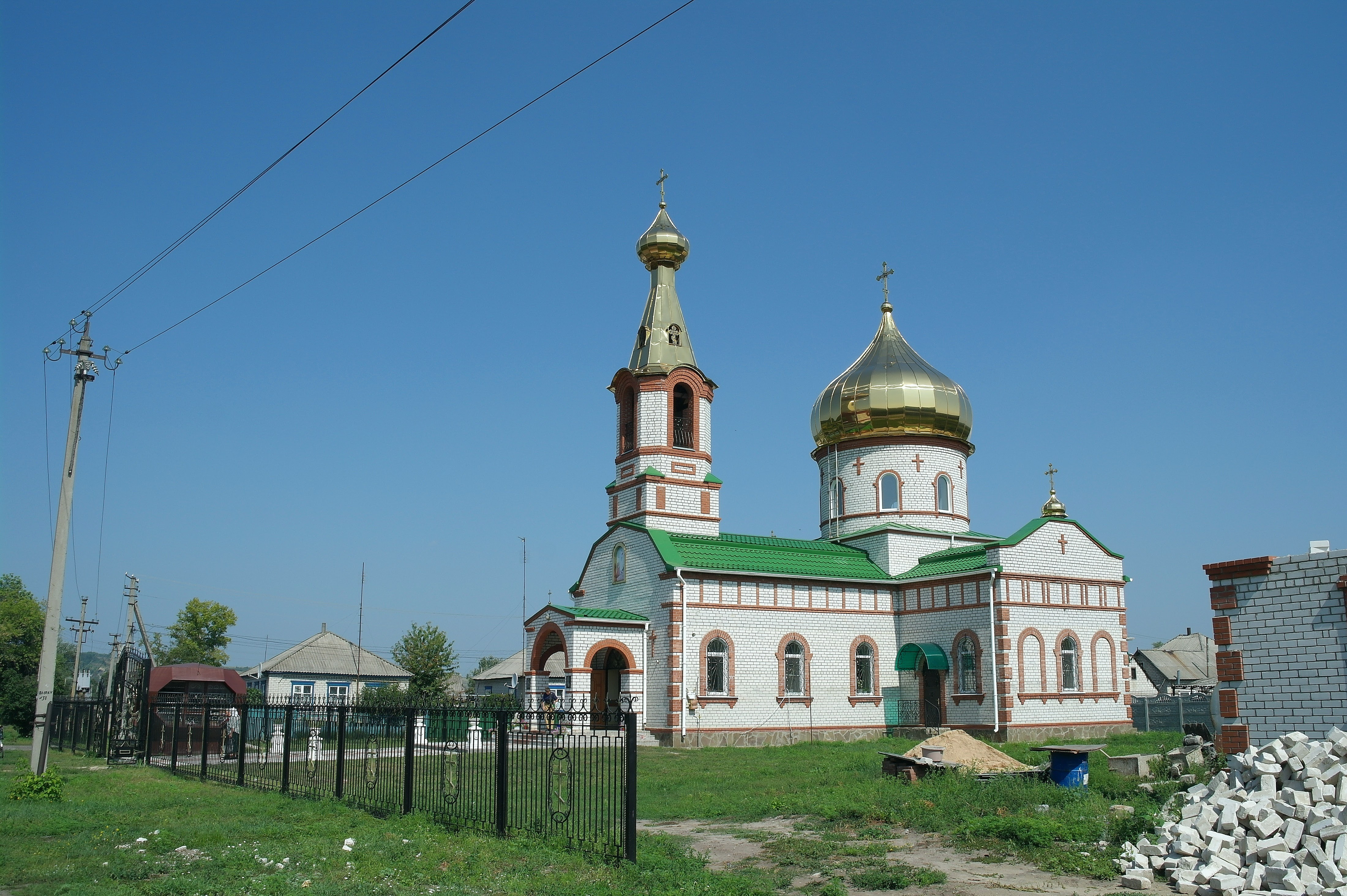

Krasnorichenske (Ukrainian: Красноріченське), known as Kabannye (Ukrainian: Кабаннє) until 1973, is a rural settlement in the Svatove Raion of the Luhansk Oblast of Ukraine. The population was estimated as 3,755 (2022 estimate).

It is the center of Krasnorichenske settlement hromada, an administrative unit.

Luhansk People's Republic officials announced on 3 March 2022 that their forces had taken control over Krasnorichenske.

== Demographics ==
As of the 2001 Ukrainian census, the village had 5,381 inhabitants. The native languages were:

Native languages in Krasnorichenske
Languages	percent
Ukrainian	93.0%
Russian	6.8%
others	0.2%
