= Holubivka, Kupiansk Raion, Kharkiv Oblast =

Village in Kharkiv Oblast, Ukraine

Holubivka Голубівка
- Village
- Interactive map of Holubivka
- Location of Holubivka within Ukraine Holubivka (Ukraine)
- Coordinates: 49.7513573°N 37.6319955°E
- Country: Ukraine
- Oblast: Kharkiv Oblast
- Raion: Kupiansk Raion
- Hromada: Kindrashivka
- Founded: 1898

Area
  - Total: 0.319 km^{2} (0.123 sq mi)
- Elevation: 115 m (377 ft)

Population (2020)
  - Total: 26
  - Density: 82/km^{2} (210/sq mi)
- Time zone: UTC+2 (EET)
  - Summer (DST): UTC+3 (EEST)
- Postal code: 62720
- Area code: +380 575042
- KATOTTH: UA63080070080068961

Holubivka (Ukrainian: Голубівка; Russian: Голубовка) is a village in Kindrashivka rural hromada, Kupiansk Raion, Kharkiv Oblast, eastern Ukraine. It is 98.59 kilometres (61.26 mi) east by south (EbS) of the centre of Kharkiv city.

== Geography ==
The settlement lies on the right bank of the Oskil river, upstream at a distance of 2.00 kilometres (1.24 mi) is the village of Kalynove, downstream it is adjacent to the town of Kupiansk, and on the opposite bank is the village of Petropavlivka.

== History ==
The settlement was founded in 1898.

== Demographics ==
As of the 2001 Ukrainian census, the settlement had 33 inhabitants, whose native languages were 93.94% Ukrainian and 6.06% Russian.
