= Hrekivka =

Village in Luhansk Oblast, Ukraine

Hrekivka Греківка
- Village
- Interactive map of Hrekivka
- Location of Hrekivka in Luhansk Oblast Hrekivka (Ukraine)
- Coordinates: 49.245833°N 37.915°E
- Country: Ukraine
- Oblast: Luhansk Oblast
- Raion: Svatove Raion
- Hromada: Krasnorichenske settlement hromada
- Founded: 1961

Government
  - Mayor: Halyna Hlobchasta

Area
  - Total: 0.653 km^{2} (0.252 sq mi)
- Elevation: 110 m (360 ft)

Population (2001 census)
  - Total: 57
  - Density: 87/km^{2} (230/sq mi)
- Time zone: UTC+2 (EET)
  - Summer (DST): UTC+3 (EEST)
- Postal code: 92911
- Area code: +380 6454
- KATOTTH: UA44100050030096749

Hrekivka (Ukrainian: Греківка; Russian: Грековка, romanized: Grekovka), known as Petrivske (Ukrainian: Петрі́вське) before 2016, is a village in Svatove Raion (district) in Luhansk Oblast of eastern Ukraine, at about 126.5 kilometres (78.6 mi) northwest from the centre of Luhansk city. It belongs to Krasnorichenske settlement hromada, one of the hromadas of Ukraine.

== History ==
The settlement was founded in 1963.

=== Russian invasion of Ukraine ===
The village came under attack and was occupied by Russian forces in 2022, during the Russian invasion of Ukraine, and was regained by Ukrainian forces on 5 October the same year.

By 21 June 2025, Russia had recaptured the settlement which resulted in Russia having control of 99.1% of Luhansk Oblast, but was regained by Ukraine again by 31 July.

== Demographics ==
As of the 2001 Ukrainian census, the settlement had 57 inhabitants, whose native languages were 92.45% Ukrainian and 7.55% Russian.
