= Nevelske =

Nevelske Невельське
- Village
- Interactive map of Nevelske
- Location of Nevelske within Ukraine Nevelske (Ukraine)
- Coordinates: 48°3′40″N 37°34′34″E
- Country: Ukraine
- Oblast: Donetsk Oblast
- District: Pokrovsk Raion
- Hromada: Ocheretyne
- Elevation: 199 m (653 ft)

Population (2001 census)
  - Total: 283
- Time zone: UTC+2 (EET)
  - Summer (DST): UTC+3 (EEST)
- Postal code: 86051
- Area code: +380 6236

Nevelske (Ukrainian: Невельське; Russian: Невельское, romanized: Nevelskoye) is a village in Pokrovsk Raion, Donetsk Oblast, Ukraine, at about 17.35 kilometres (10.78 mi) west by north (WbN) from the centre of Donetsk city. Nevelske belongs to Ocheretyne settlement hromada.

== History ==
=== Russo-Ukrainian War ===
==== War in Donbas ====
The War in Donbas, which lasted from mid-April 2014 until the Russian invasion of Ukraine in February 2022, brought both civilian and military casualties. Two Ukrainian servicemen were killed and two others were wounded in action at Nevelske on 8 November 2014. Two Ukrainian soldiers were wounded at Nevelske on 16 December 2016, and another was killed by shelling at a Ukrainian army position near the settlement. On 14 November 2021 nine houses were damaged due to the shelling of Nevelske. Three days later seven houses were damaged, destroying two of them.

==== Russian invasion of Ukraine ====
On 12 March 2024, during the Russian invasion of Ukraine, the Russian Ministry of Defense announced the full capture of Nevelske by Russian forces, later on the settlement was referred to as a "grey zone".

On 9 August 2024, geolocated footage confirmed that the village had been recaptured by Russia.

== Demographics ==
As of the 2001 Ukrainian census, the settlement had 283 inhabitants. Their native languages were 83.92% Russian and 16.08% Ukrainian.
