= Pishchane, Kharkiv Oblast =

Pishchane Піщане
- Village
- Interactive map of Pishchane
- Pishchane shown within Ukraine Pishchane shown within Kharkiv
- Coordinates: 49°34′6″N 37°49′58″E
- Country: Ukraine
- Oblast: Kharkiv Oblast
- Raion: Kupiansk Raion
- Hromada: Petropavlivka rural hromada
- Founded: 1650
- Elevation: 94 m (308 ft)

Population
  - Total: 528
- Postal code: 63743
- Area code: +380 5742

Pishchane (Ukrainian: Піщане) is a village in Petropavlivka rural hromada, Kupiansk Raion, Kharkiv Oblast, Ukraine. The population was 528 in the 2001 Ukrainian census.

== History ==
The village was founded in 1650.

As part of the Russo-Ukrainian War, the village was occupied by Russia in the early stages of the invasion but liberated by Ukraine during their 2022 Kharkiv counteroffensive. The village was claimed by a Russian milblogger to have came under Russian pressure again in June 2024 and was entered by Russian troops and became contested again on 6 July 2024. On 20 July, the village was confirmed to have been captured by Russia.

== Demographics ==
According to the Ukrainian national census in 2001, Pishchane had a population of 528 inhabitants. The linguistic composition of the population was as follows:

First languages in Pishchane
	percent
Ukrainian	94.9%
Russian	3.8%
Belarusian	0.4%
Armenian	0.2%
others	0.8%
