= Tabaivka =

Tabaivka Табаївка
- Village
- Location within Kharkiv Oblast Location within Ukraine
- Coordinates: 49°36′01″N 37°52′39″E
- Country: Ukraine
- Oblast: Kharkiv Oblast
- Raion: Kupiansk Raion

Population (2001)
  - Total: 34
- Postal code: 63742

Tabaivka (Ukrainian: Табаївка [tɐˈbɑjiu̯kɐ]) is a village in Kupiansk Raion, Kharkiv Oblast, Ukraine.

== History ==
Russia Has Claimed Control On January 29, 2024 but as of September 12th 2025 ISW Confirms that Tabaivka is in Russian Control.

== Population ==
=== Language ===
Distribution of the population by native language according to the 2001 census:

Language	Number	Percentage
Ukrainian	33	97.06%
Russian	1	2.94%
Total	34	100.00%
