= Zherebets (river) =

Left tributary of the Donets in Ukraine

Coordinates: 48°56′22″N 38°05′34″E

Zherebets River
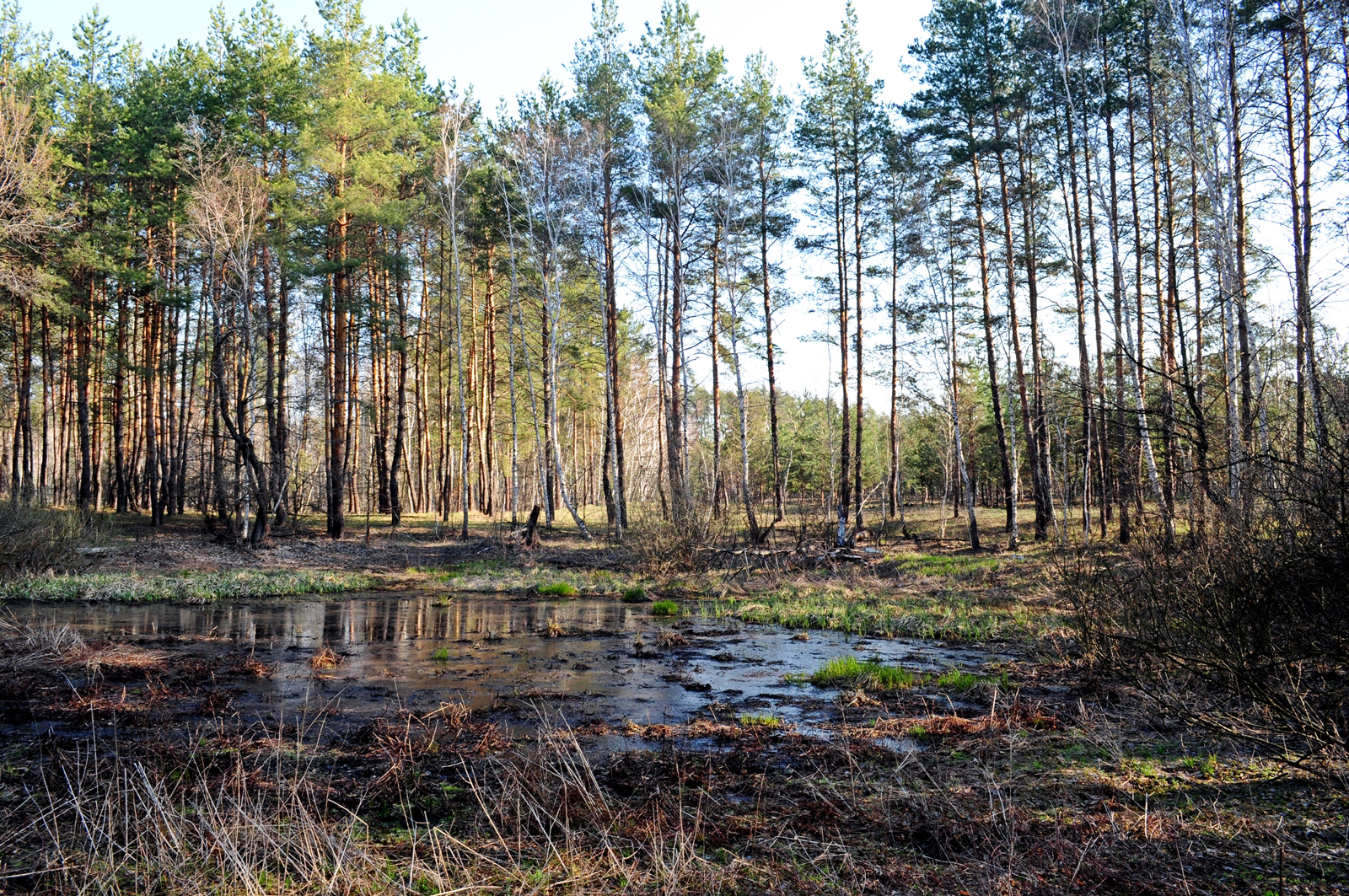

Location
- Country: Ukraine
- Oblast: Donetsk Oblast; Luhansk Oblast

Physical characteristics
- Source
  - location: Stelmakhivka
- Mouth
  - location: Siverskyi Donets
- Length: 88 kilometres (55 mi)
- Basin size: 990 km^{2} (382.24 sq mi)
- Discharge
  - average: 25.37 m^{3}/s (896 cu ft/s)

The Zherebets (Ukrainian: Жеребець, lit. 'stallion') is a river in eastern Ukraine. It is a tributary of the Donets, and mainly flows through the western areas of the Donbas, including Svatove Raion, Sievierodonetsk Raion, and Kramatorsk Raion. The length of the river is approximately 88 km, and the floodplain is almost 1,000 km^{2} in area.
