= Krokhmalne =

Village in Kharkiv Oblast, Ukraine

Krokhmalne Крохмальне
- Village
- Interactive map of Krokhmalne
- Location of Krokhmalne within Ukraine Krokhmalne (Ukraine)
- Coordinates: 49.573056°N 37.917222°E
- Country: Ukraine
- Oblast: Kharkiv Oblast
- Raion: Kupiansk Raion
- Hromada: Petropavlivka rural hromada
- Founded: 1759

Area
  - Total: 0.43 km^{2} (0.17 sq mi)
- Elevation: 129 m (423 ft)

Population (2001 census)
  - Total: 41
  - Density: 95/km^{2} (250/sq mi)
- Time zone: UTC+2 (EET)
  - Summer (DST): UTC+3 (EEST)
- Postal code: 63742
- Area code: +380 5742

Krokhmalne (Ukrainian: Крохмальне; Russian: Крахмальное) is a village in Kupiansk Raion (district) in Kharkiv Oblast of eastern Ukraine, at about 125.53 kilometres (78.00 mi) southeast by south (SEbS) of the centre of Kharkiv city. It belongs to Petropavlivka rural hromada, one of the hromadas of Ukraine.

== History ==
Krokhmalne was founded in 1759.

In February 2022, during the Russian invasion of Ukraine, the village was occupied by the Armed Forces of Russia. In autumn of the same year, during the counteroffensive of the Armed Forces of Ukraine in Kharkiv Oblast, the village was returned under Ukrainian control.

In January 2024 the village was taken under control by Russian forces for the second time, after a failed Ukrainian counter-offensive.

== Demographics ==
As of the 2001 Ukrainian census, the settlement had 41 inhabitants. Their native languages were 88.67% Ukrainian and 11.11% Russian.
