= Petropavlivka, Kupiansk Raion, Kharkiv Oblast =

Village in Kharkiv Oblast, Ukraine

Petropavlivka Петропавлівка
- Village
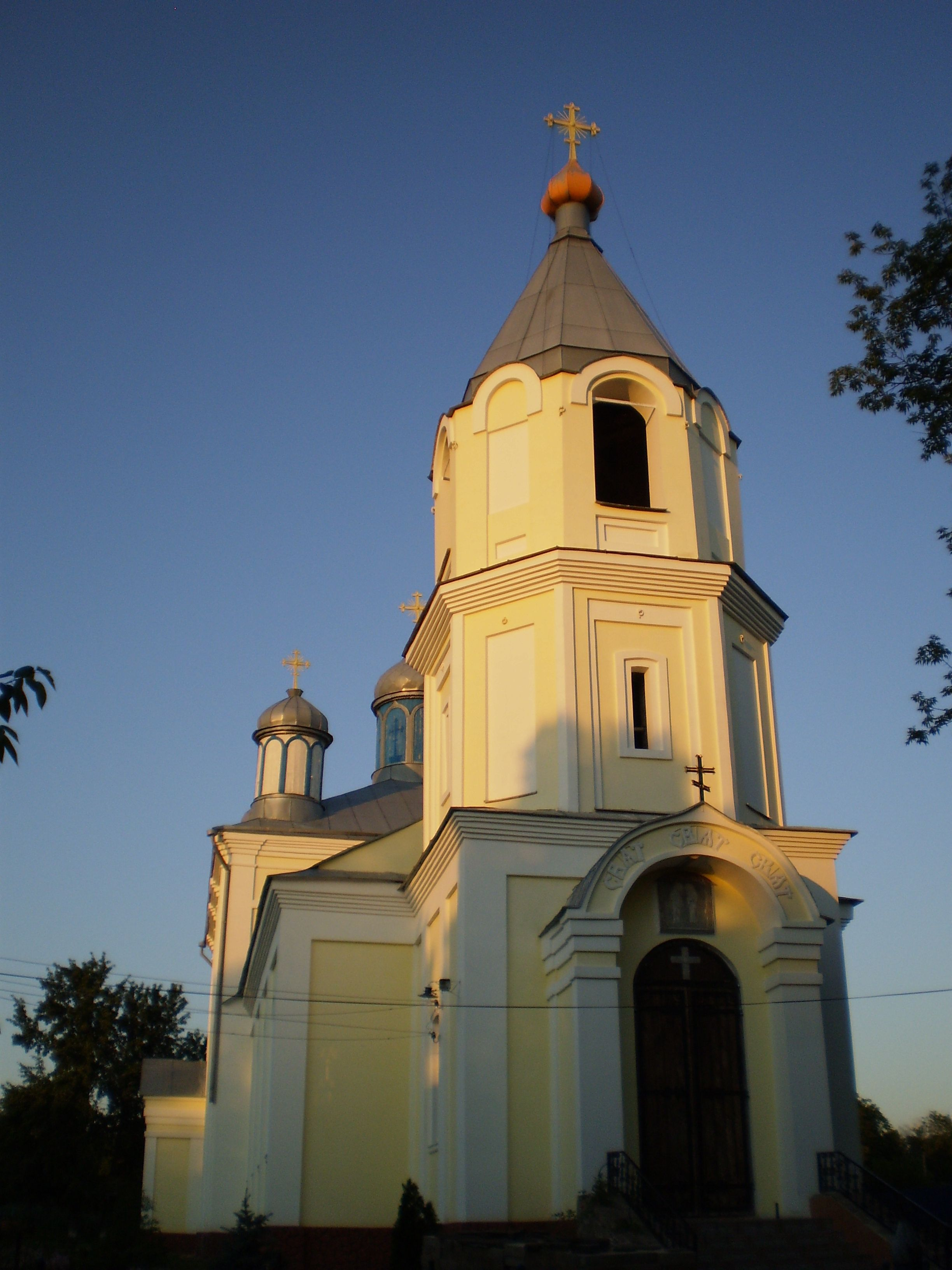
- Front of the Church of St. Peter and Paul

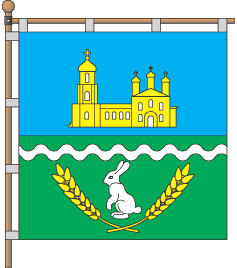
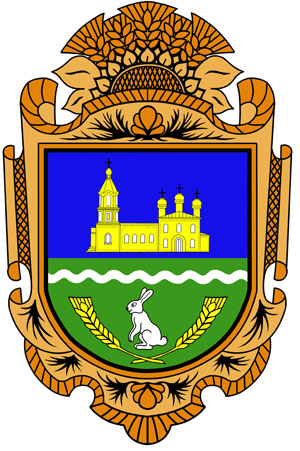
- Flag Coat of arms
- Interactive map of Petropavlivka
- Coordinates: 49°43′00″N 37°43′09″E
- Country: Ukraine
- Oblast: Kharkiv Oblast
- Raion: Kupiansk Raion
- Founded: 1686

Government
  - Type: Petropavlivka rural hromada

Area
  - Total: 9,121 km^{2} (3,522 sq mi)
- Elevation: 106 m (348 ft)

Population (2001 census)
  - Total: 2,452
  - Density: 0.2688/km^{2} (0.6963/sq mi)
- Time zone: UTC+2 (EET)
  - Summer (DST): UTC+3 (EEST)
- Postal code: 63722
- Area code: +380 5742
- KOATUU code: 6323785501

Petropavlivka (Ukrainian: Петропавлівка, Russian: Петропавловка, romanized: Petropavlovka) is a village in Kupiansk Raion, Kharkiv Oblast, Ukraine. The village is located about 110.4 kilometres (68.6 mi) east by south (EbS) of the centre of Kharkiv. The village also hosts the administration of the Petropavlivka rural hromada, one of the hromadas of Ukraine.

The settlement came under attack by Russian forces during the Russian invasion of Ukraine in 2022 and was regained by Ukrainian forces by the end of September the same year. In September 2024, Russian forces advanced into northern Petropavlivka. By 20 November 2025, Russian forces managed to recapture the settlement of Petropavlivka.

== History ==
- 1821 — date of first mention.
- 1872 — date of renaming to the village of "Petropavlovka".
- On February 27, 2022, the Russian Armed Forces captured Petropavlivka.
- On October 2, 2022, during the Ukrainian counteroffensive, the Ukrainian Armed Forces recaptured Petropavlivka.
- By 20 November 2025, Russian forces again recaptured the village.

== Demographics ==
As of the Ukrainian national census in 2001, the settlement had a population of 2,486 inhabitants. The linguistic composition of the population was as follows:

Languages in Petropavlivka
	percent
Ukrainian	92.6%
Russian	6.7%
Romanian	0.3%
Belarusian	0.1%
others	0.3%

== See also ==
List of nearby settlements

- Kupiansk
- Kucherivka
- Podoli
