= Slatyne =

Rural locality in Kharkiv Oblast, Ukraine

Slatyne Слатине
- Rural settlement
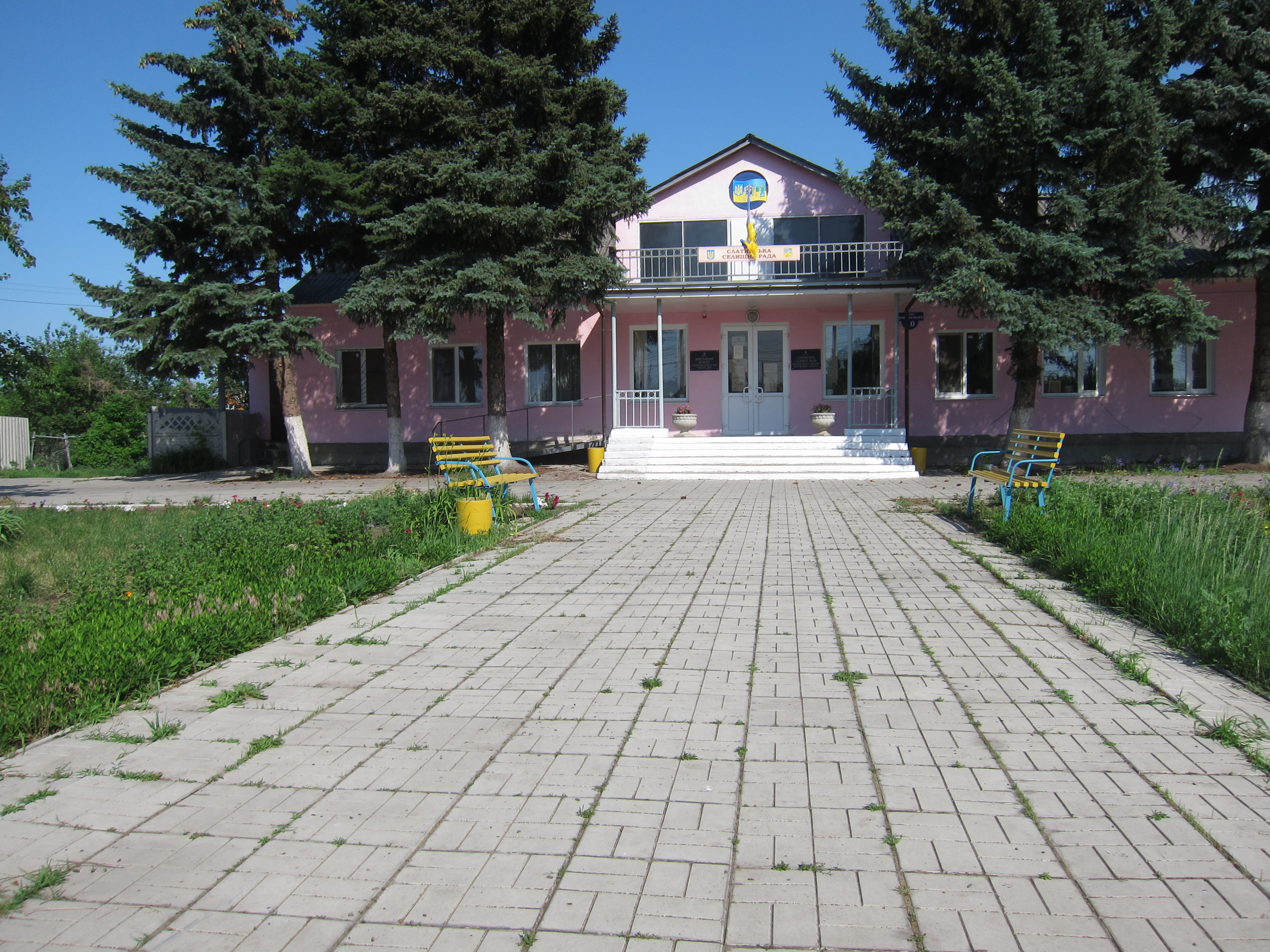
- Village council

- Location in Kharkiv Oblast Location in Ukraine
- Coordinates: 50°12′39″N 36°09′18″E
- Country: Ukraine
- Oblast: Kharkiv Oblast
- Raion: Kharkiv Raion

Population (2022)
  - Total: 5,998
- Time zone: UTC+2 (EET)
  - Summer (DST): UTC+3 (EEST)

Slatyne (Ukrainian: Слатине, Russian: Слатино) is a rural settlement in Kharkiv Raion of Kharkiv Oblast in eastern Ukraine. It is located on the left bank of the Lopan, in the drainage basin of the Don. Slatyne belongs to Derhachi urban hromada, one of the hromadas of Ukraine. Population: 5,998 (2022 estimate).

== History ==
During the Ukrainian War of Independence, from 1917 to 1920, it passed between various factions. Afterwards it was administratively part of the Kharkiv Governorate of Ukraine.

Until 18 July 2020, Slatyne belonged to Derhachi Raion. The raion was abolished in July 2020 as part of the administrative reform of Ukraine, which reduced the number of raions of Kharkiv Oblast to seven. The area of Derhachi Raion was merged into Kharkiv Raion.

Until 26 January 2024, Slatyne was designated urban-type settlement. On this day, a new law entered into force which abolished this status, and Slatyne became a rural settlement.

== Geography ==
Slatyne is located north of Derhachi, in the northern part of the Kharkiv Oblast, next to Prudianka. The Lopan River, a left tributary of the Uda River (Donets Basin) flows through the village. Slatyne is located on the Central Russian Upland, within the forest steppe natural zone, a small forest massif (oak) adjoins the village. The relief of the settlement is an undulating plain with ravines and gullies. The Slatyne Reservoir is located on the territory of the village.

The climate of Slatyne is temperate continental with cold winters and hot summers. The average annual temperature is +8.7 °C (in January -4.5, in July +22). The average annual rainfall is 520 mm. The highest rainfall occurs in the summer. There are large forest areas (pine and deciduous trees) on the territory of the settlement. The soils of the community are chernozems and meadow soils.

== Economy ==
=== Transportation ===
Slatyne railway station is on the railway connecting Kharkiv - Kozacha Lopan - Belgorod.

The settlement has road access to Highway M20 which connects Kharkiv with the Russian border and continues across the border to Belgorod.
