= Bezruky =

Village in Kharkiv Raion, Kharkiv Oblast, Ukraine

Coordinates: 50°10′29″N 36°07′12″E

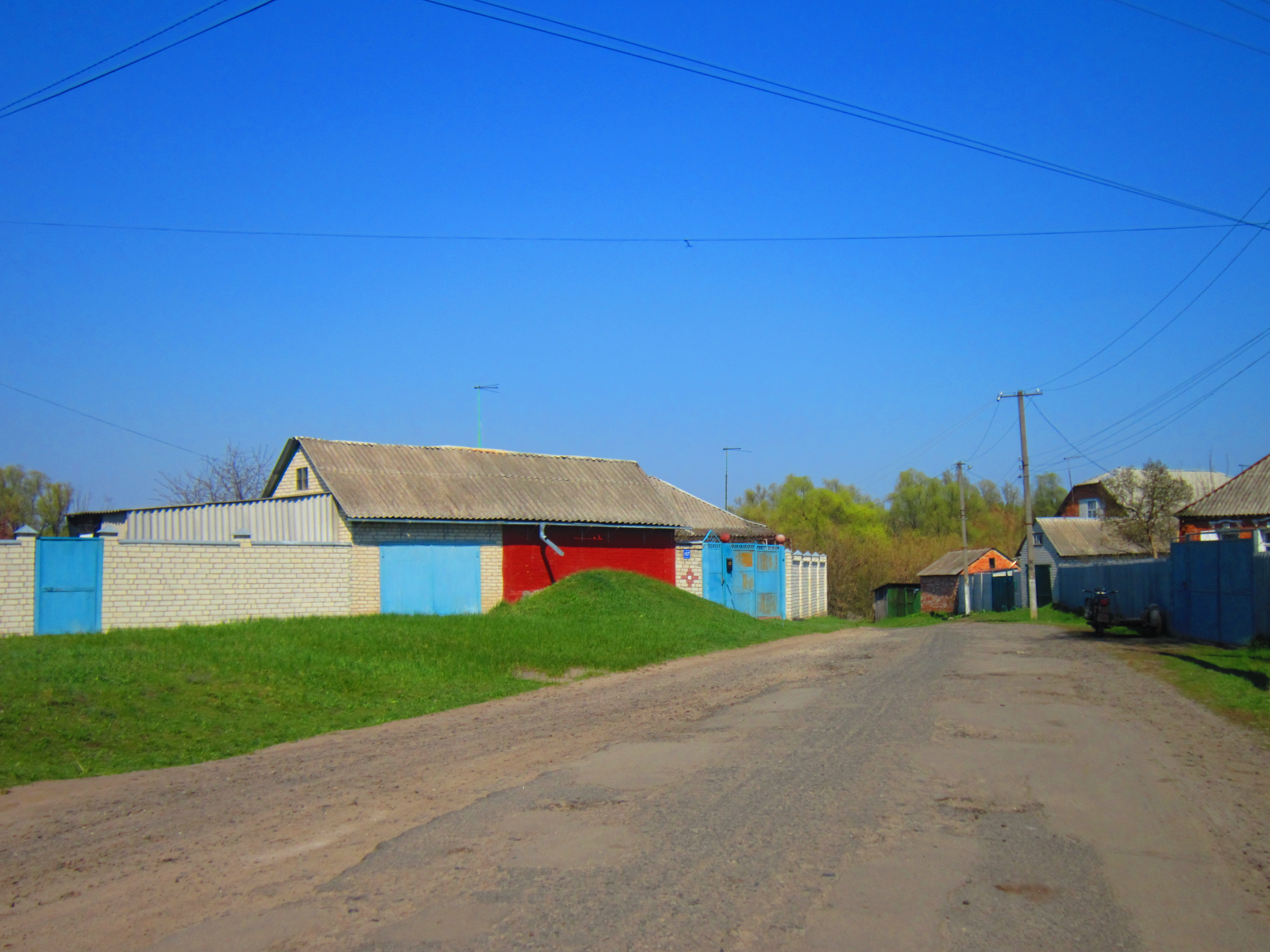

Bezruky (Безручки) is a village in the Kharkiv Raion of Kharkiv Oblast in Ukraine. The area was invaded by Russia in 2022 and liberated by Ukraine the same year.

== Geography ==
The village of Bezruky is located north of Dergachi, on the Lopan River (Donets Basin). The riverbed is very winding and many irrigation canals are laid along it. Upstream of Lopan, 1 km away, is the village of Solonyi Yar and the town of Slatyne, downstream it adjoins the villages of Shovkoplyasy and Yemtsi, and 2 km away is the village of Leschenky.

The territory of the Bezruky is located on the Central Russian Upland, within the forest steppe natural zone, a small forest massif (oak) adjoins the village. The relief of the village is an undulating plain with ravines and gullies.

The climate of the Bezruky is temperate continental with cold winters and hot summers. The average annual temperature is +8.7 °C (in January -4.5, in July +22). The average annual rainfall is 520 mm. The highest rainfall occurs in the summer. There are large forest areas (pine and deciduous trees) on the territory of the raion. The soils of the community are chernozems and meadow soils.

The Kozacha Lopan-Kharkiv railway line passes near the village, the nearest railway station is located in Bezrukivka. The regional highway passes in the north of the village, bus connections are carried out from Slatino, Dergachi, Kharkiv.

== Population ==
According to the 1989 census of the Ukrainian SSR, the village had a population of 2,679 people, of whom 1,246 were men and 1,433 were women. According to the 2001 census of Ukraine, the village had a population of 2,463 people. The distribution of the population by native language according to the 2001 census was: 84.13% - Ukrainian, 15.67% - Russian.
