= Tokarivka, Kharkiv Raion, Kharkiv Oblast =

Village in Kharkiv Oblast, Ukraine

Tokarivka Токарівка
- Village
- Interactive map of Tokarivka
- Location of Tokarivka within Ukraine Tokarivka (Ukraine)
- Coordinates: 50.283056°N 36.237778°E
- Country: Ukraine
- Oblast: Kharkiv Oblast
- Raion: Kharkiv Raion
- Hromada: Derhachi
- Founded: 1850

Area
  - Total: 0.396 km^{2} (0.153 sq mi)
- Elevation: 152 m (499 ft)

Population (2001 census)
  - Total: 16
  - Density: 40/km^{2} (100/sq mi)
- Time zone: UTC+2 (EET)
  - Summer (DST): UTC+3 (EEST)
- Postal code: 62313
- Area code: +380 5763

Tokarivka (Ukrainian: Токарівка; Russian: Токаревка) is a village (selo) in Kharkiv Raion (district) in Kharkiv Oblast of eastern Ukraine, located 31.37 kilometres (19.49 mi) north by west (NbW) of the centre of Kharkiv city, 3.39 kilometres (2.11 mi) westwards of the Russia–Ukraine border. It belongs to Derhachi urban hromada, one of the hromadas of Ukraine.

== History ==
=== Russian invasion ===
Since the beginning of the Russian invasion of Ukraine, the village has been temporarily occupied by Russian army. The settlement was regained by Ukrainian army on 11 September 2022.

== Geography ==
The village of Tokarivka is located in the north of the Kharkiv Oblast, next to the village Hoptivka, on the banks of the Tatarka River, a left tributary Lopan River (Donets Basin). The village is located near the state border of Ukraine with Russia. The territory of the Tokarivka is located on the Central Russian Upland, within the forest steppe natural zone, a small forest massif (oak) adjoins the village. The relief of the village is an undulating plain with ravines and gullies.

The climate of the Tokarivka is temperate continental with cold winters and hot summers. The average annual temperature is +8.7 °C (in January -4.5, in July +22). The average annual rainfall is 520 mm. The highest rainfall occurs in the summer. There are large forest areas (pine and deciduous trees) on the territory of the village. The soils of the community are chernozems and meadow soils.

Tokarivka has a highway through Hoptivka to the M20 state highway.

== Demographics ==
As of the 2001 Ukrainian census, the settlement had 16 inhabitants, whose native languages were 75.00% Ukrainian and 25.00% Russian.
