= Pytomnyk, Kharkiv Oblast =

Rural settlement in Kharkiv Oblast, Ukraine

Pytomnyk Питомник
- Interactive map of Pytomnyk
- Location of Pytomnyk within Ukraine Pytomnyk (Ukraine)
- Coordinates: 50.171111°N 36.265278°E
- Country: Ukraine
- Oblast: Kharkiv Oblast
- Raion: Kharkiv Raion
- Founded: 1650

Area
  - Total: 1.208 km^{2} (0.466 sq mi)
- Elevation: 199 m (653 ft)

Population (2001 census)
  - Total: 205
  - Density: 170/km^{2} (440/sq mi)
- Time zone: UTC+2 (EET)
  - Summer (DST): UTC+3 (EEST)
- Postal code: 62332
- Area code: +380 5763

Pytomnyk (Ukrainian: Питомник) is a rural settlement in Kharkiv Raion, Kharkiv Oblast, eastern Ukraine, at about 21.5 kilometres (13.4 mi) north by east from the centre of Kharkiv city. It belongs to Derhachi urban hromada, one of the hromadas of Ukraine.The local government is the Rusko-Lozivska village council.

The settlement came under attack by Russian forces in 2022, during the Russian invasion of Ukraine. The Armed Forces of Ukraine liberated the village of Pytomnyk on May 11, 2022.

== Geography ==
The village of Pytomnyk is located at about 21.5 kilometres (13.4 mi) north of Kharkiv, in the northern part of the Kharkiv Oblast, next to Ruska Lozova. The village is located on the watershed of the Lopan and Kharkiv river basins (Donets Basin). The territory of the Pytomnyk is located on the Central Russian Upland, within the forest steppe natural zone, a forest massif (oak) adjoins the village. The relief of the village is an undulating plain with ravines and gullies.

The climate of the Pytomnyk is temperate continental with cold winters and hot summers. The average annual temperature is +8.7 °C (in January -4.5, in July +22). The average annual rainfall is 520 mm. The highest rainfall occurs in the summer. There are large forest areas (pine and deciduous trees) on the territory of the village. The soils of the community are chernozems and meadow soils.

Olkhova Balka Wildlife Park is located near the village.

A highway M20 passes through the village Pytomnyk. There is no railway connection. The nearest railway station is in Kharkiv.
