= Prudianka =

Rural locality in Kharkiv Oblast, Ukraine

Prudianka Прудянка
- Rural settlement
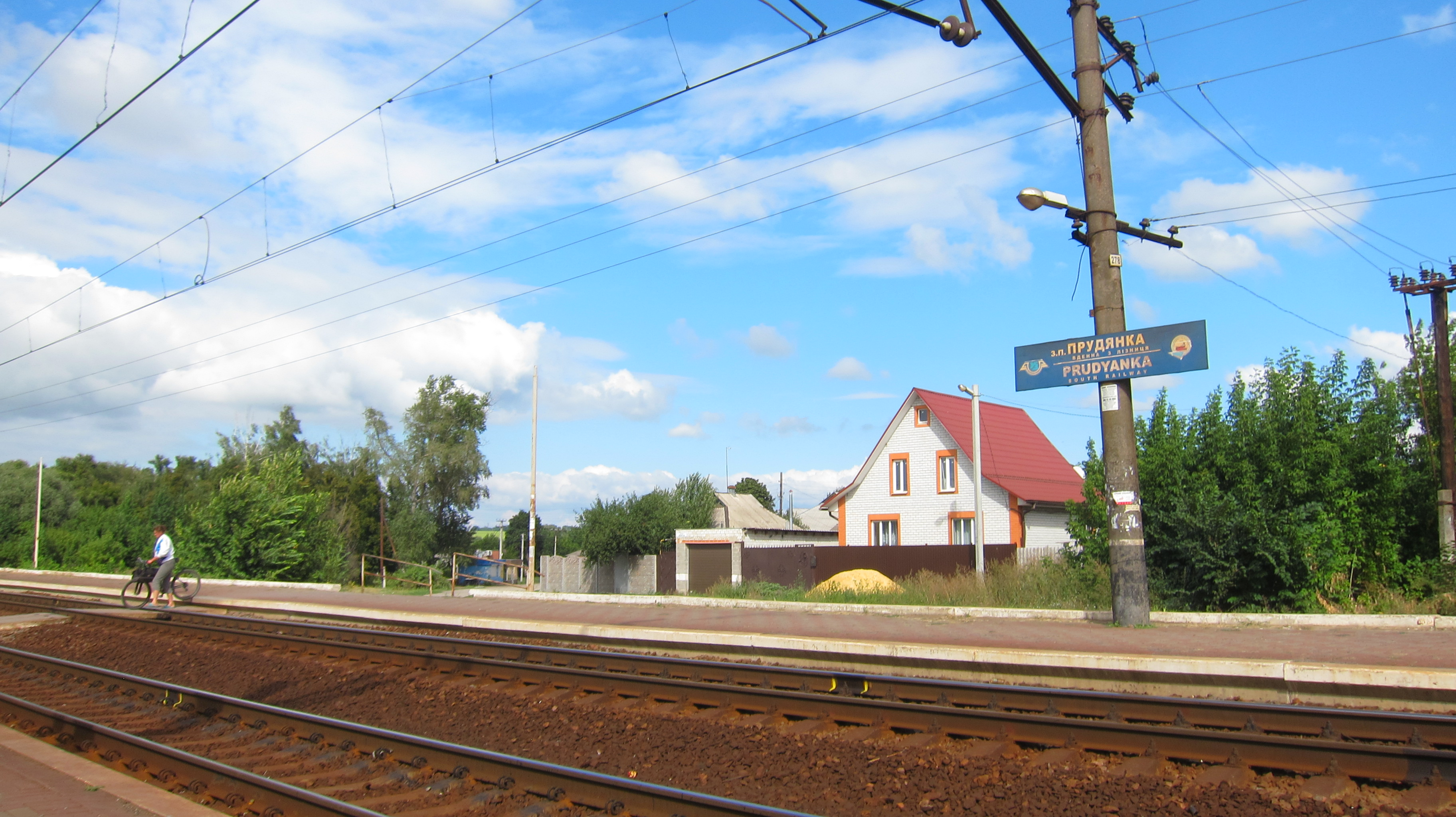
- Railway station in the village.
- Interactive map of Prudianka
- Location in Kharkiv Oblast Location in Ukraine
- Coordinates: 50°14′30″N 36°10′06″E
- Country: Ukraine
- Oblast: Kharkiv Oblast
- Raion: Kharkiv Raion

Population (2022)
  - Total: 1,749
- Time zone: UTC+2 (EET)
  - Summer (DST): UTC+3 (EEST)

Prudianka (Ukrainian: Прудянка, Russian: Прудянка) is a rural settlement in Kharkiv Raion of Kharkiv Oblast in Ukraine. It is located on the left bank of the Lopan, in the drainage basin of the Don. Prudianka belongs to Derhachi urban hromada, one of the hromadas of Ukraine. Population: 1,749 (2022 estimate).

== History ==
Until 18 July 2020, Prudianka belonged to Derhachi Raion. The raion was abolished in July 2020 as part of the administrative reform of Ukraine, which reduced the number of raions of Kharkiv Oblast to seven. The area of Derhachi Raion was merged into Kharkiv Raion.

Prudianka was captured by Ukrainian forces on 22 April 2022.

Until 26 January 2024, Prudianka was designated urban-type settlement. On this day, a new law entered into force which abolished this status, and Prudianka became a rural settlement.

== Economy ==
=== Transportation ===
Prudianka railway station is on the railway connecting Kharkiv and Belgorod. There is local passenger traffic between Kharkiv and Kozacha Lopan.

The settlement has road access to Highway M20 which connects Kharkiv with the Russian border and continues across the border to Belgorod.
