= Mala Danylivka =

Rural locality in Kharkiv Oblast, Ukraine

Mala Danylivka Мала Данилівка
- Rural settlement
- Location in Kharkiv Oblast Location in Ukraine
- Coordinates: 50°04′05″N 36°09′53″E
- Country: Ukraine
- Oblast: Kharkiv Oblast
- Raion: Kharkiv Raion

Population (2022)
  - Total: 8,085
- Time zone: UTC+2 (EET)
  - Summer (DST): UTC+3 (EEST)

Mala Danylivka (Ukrainian: Мала Данилівка, Russian: Малая Даниловка) is a rural settlement in Kharkiv Raion of Kharkiv Oblast in Ukraine. It is essentially a northern suburb of the city of Kharkiv and is located between Kharkiv and Derhachi on the banks of the Lopan and the Lozovenka rivers, in the drainage basin of the Don. Mala Danylivka hosts the administration of Mala Danylivka settlement hromada, one of the hromadas of Ukraine. Population: 8,085 (2022 estimate).

== History ==
Until 18 July 2020, Mala Danylivka belonged to Derhachi Raion. The raion was abolished in July 2020 as part of the administrative reform of Ukraine, which reduced the number of raions of Kharkiv Oblast to seven. The area of Derhachi Raion was merged into Kharkiv Raion.

Until 26 January 2024, Mala Danylivka was designated urban-type settlement. On this day, a new law entered into force which abolished this status, and Mala Danylivka became a rural settlement.

== Economy ==
=== Transportation ===
Lozovenka and Pidhorodna railway stations are on the railway connecting Kharkiv and Belgorod. There is local passenger traffic between Kharkiv and Kozacha Lopan.

The settlement is adjacent to the Kharkiv Ring Road.
