= Ruska Lozova =

Village in Amalgamated Hromada Derhachi, Kharkiv Raion, Kharkiv Oblast, Ukraine

Ruska Lozova Руська Лозова
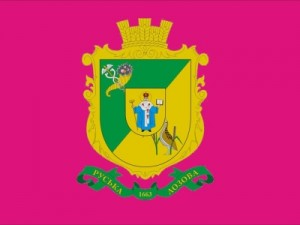
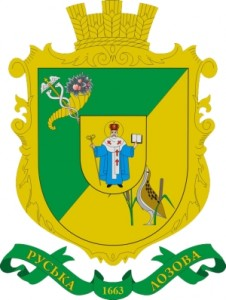
- Flag Seal

- Location within Kharkiv Oblast Location within Ukraine
- Coordinates: 50°8′26″N 36°16′46″E
- Country: Ukraine
- Oblast: Kharkiv Oblast
- Raion: Kharkiv Raion
- Hromada: Derhachi urban hromada
- Founded: 1663

Population (2001)
  - Total: 5,016
- Time zone: UTC+2 (EET)
  - Summer (DST): UTC+3 (EEST)

Ruska Lozova (Ukrainian: Руська Лозова, Russian: Русская Лозовая) is a village (selo) in Ukraine, in Kharkiv district of Kharkiv Oblast. It belongs to Derhachi urban hromada, one of the hromadas of Ukraine. The local government is the Rusko-Lozivska village council. As of 2001, Ruska Lozova had a population of 5,016 people.

== Geography ==
The village of Ruska Lozova is located north of Kharkiv, on the Lozovenka River (Donets Basin). The territory of the Ruska Lozova is located on the Central Russian Upland, within the forest steppe natural zone, a small forest massif (oak) adjoins the village. The relief of the village is an undulating plain with ravines and gullies.

The climate of the Ruska Lozova is temperate continental with cold winters and hot summers. The average annual temperature is +8.7 °C (in January -4.5, in July +22). The average annual rainfall is 520 mm. The highest rainfall occurs in the summer. There are large forest areas (pine and deciduous trees) on the territory of the village. The soils of the community are chernozems and meadow soils.

A highway M20 passes through the village Ruska Lozova. There is no railway connection.

== History ==
Ruska Lozova was founded in 1663. The village suffered as a result of the Holodomor from 1932 to 1933, during which 20 people in the village died.

Until 18 July 2020, Ruska Lozova belonged to Derhachi Raion. The raion was abolished in July 2020 as part of the administrative reform of Ukraine, which reduced the number of raions of Kharkiv Oblast to seven. The area of Derhachi Raion was merged into Kharkiv Raion.

The suburb was used in early 2022, during the Russian occupation of Kharkiv Oblast, as a launch point by the Russian army firing at the city's civilian infrastructure. Ukrainian forces re-took the village from Russian troops on 29 April of that year.

== Gallery ==
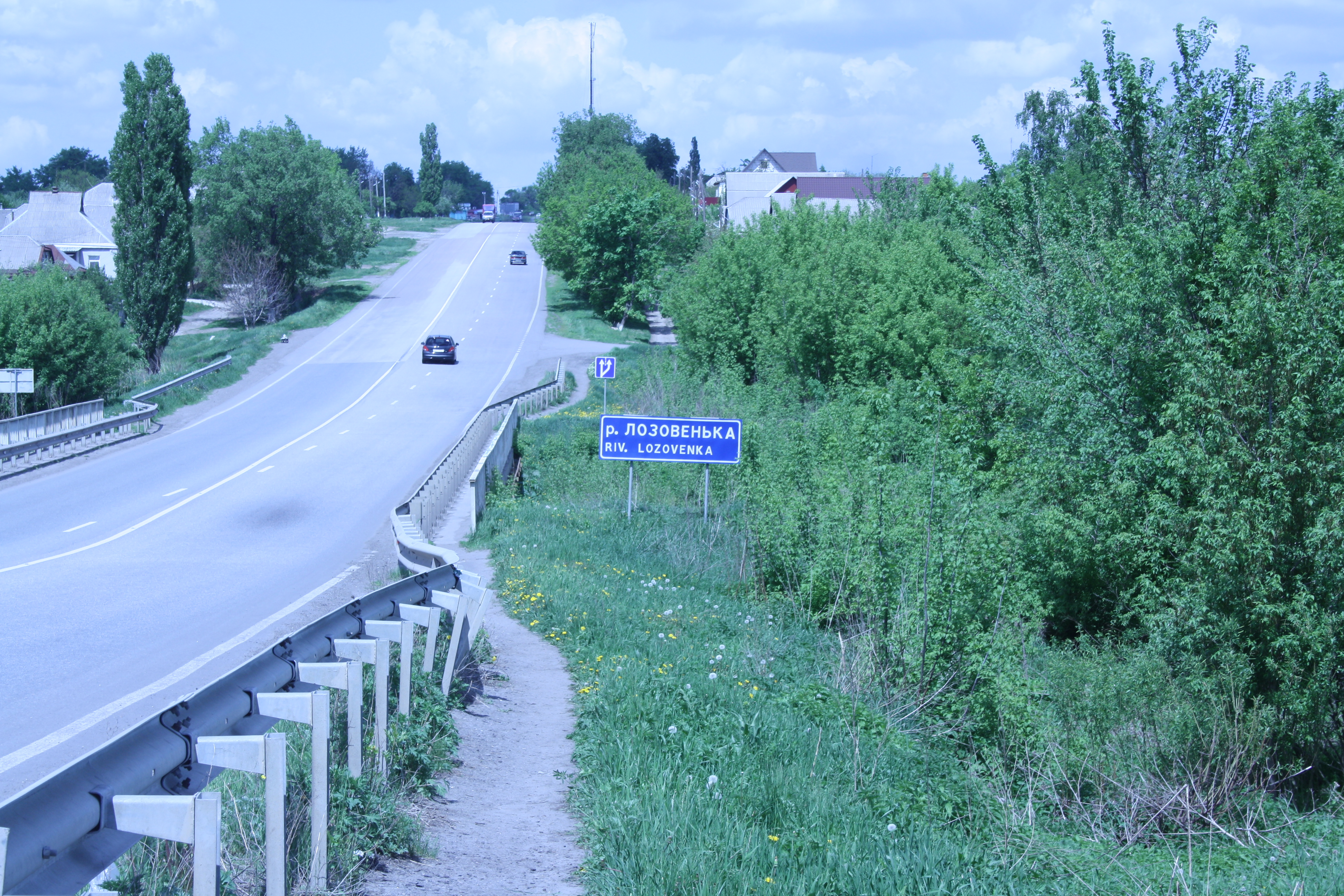
Lozovenka river

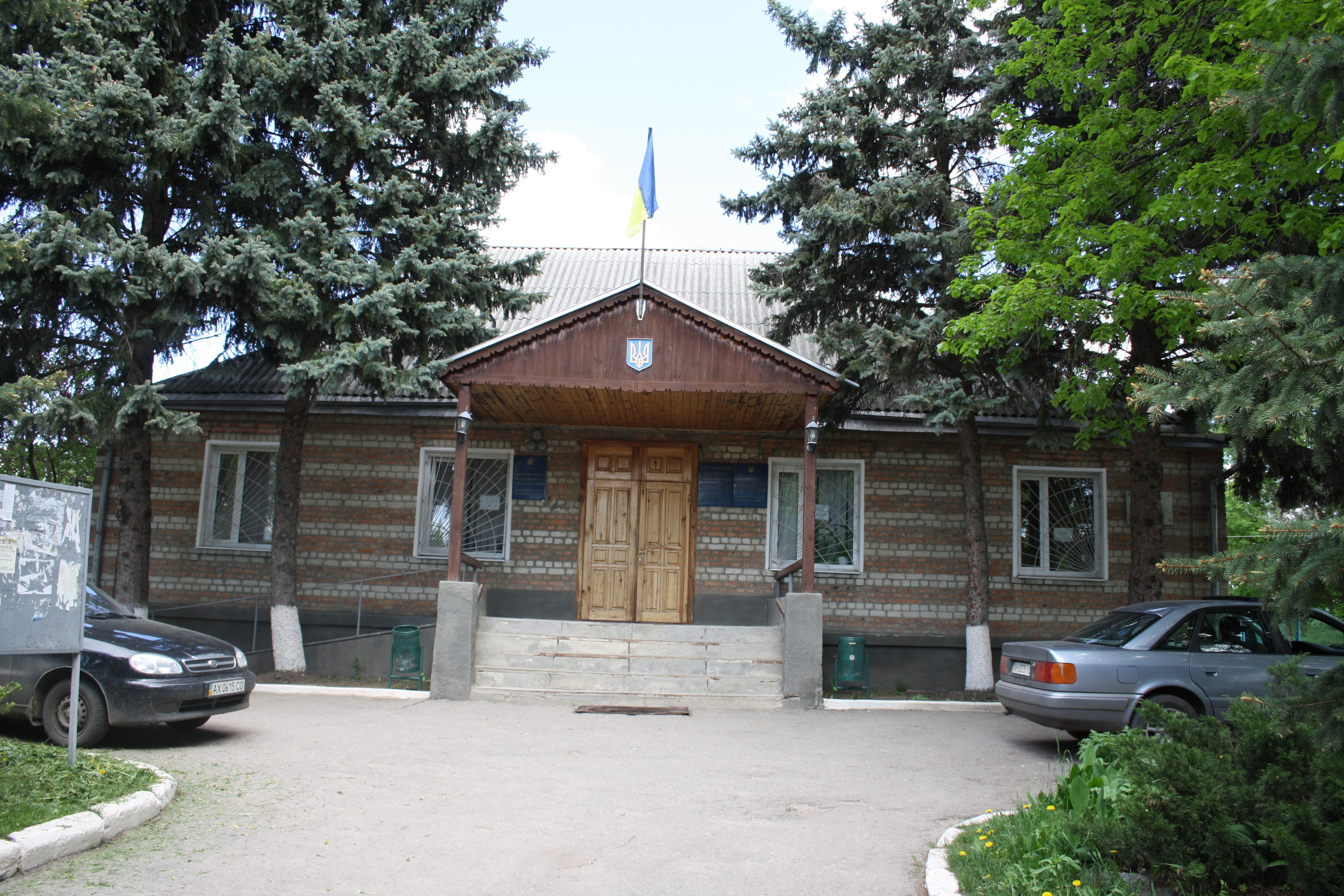
Village council

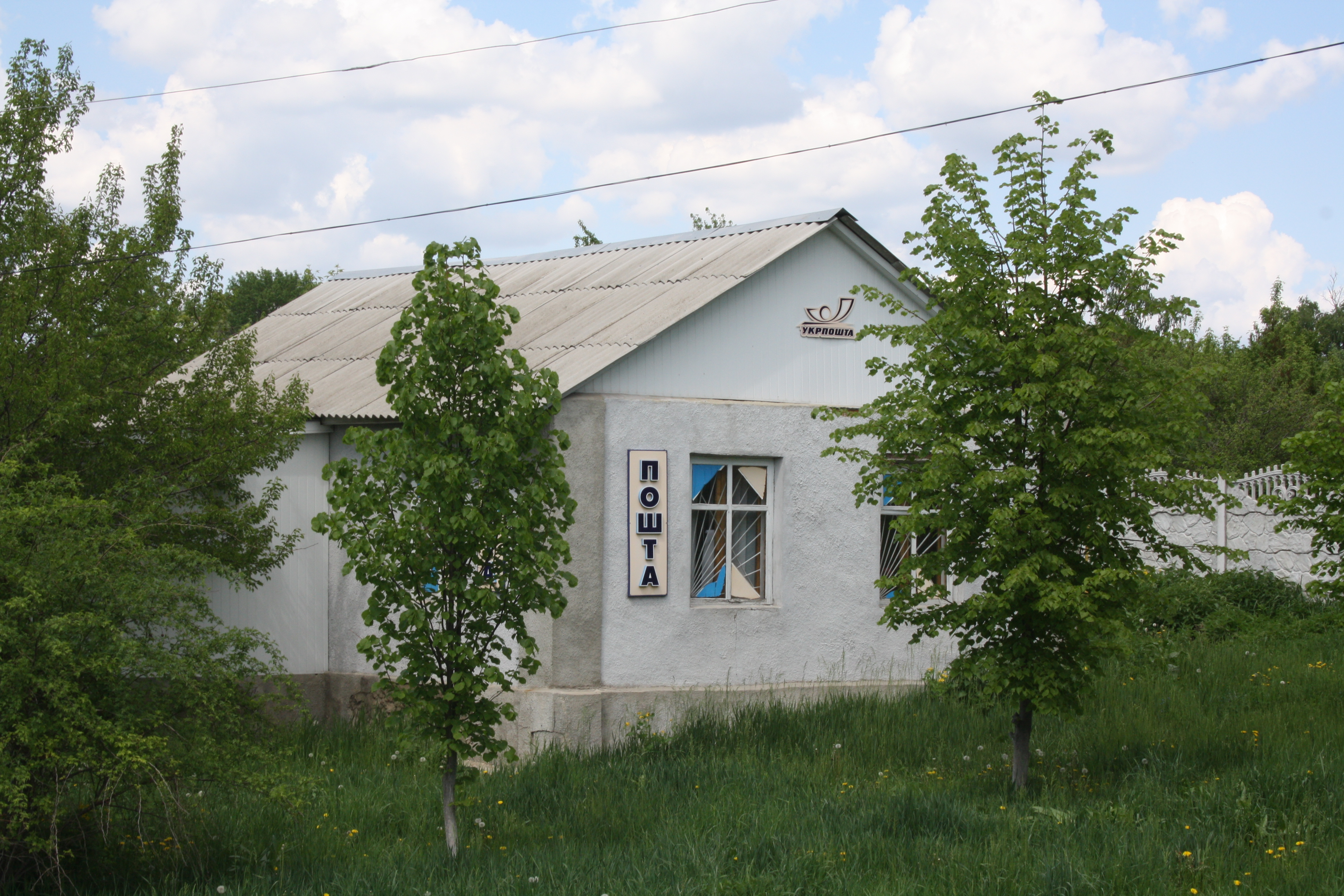
Post office

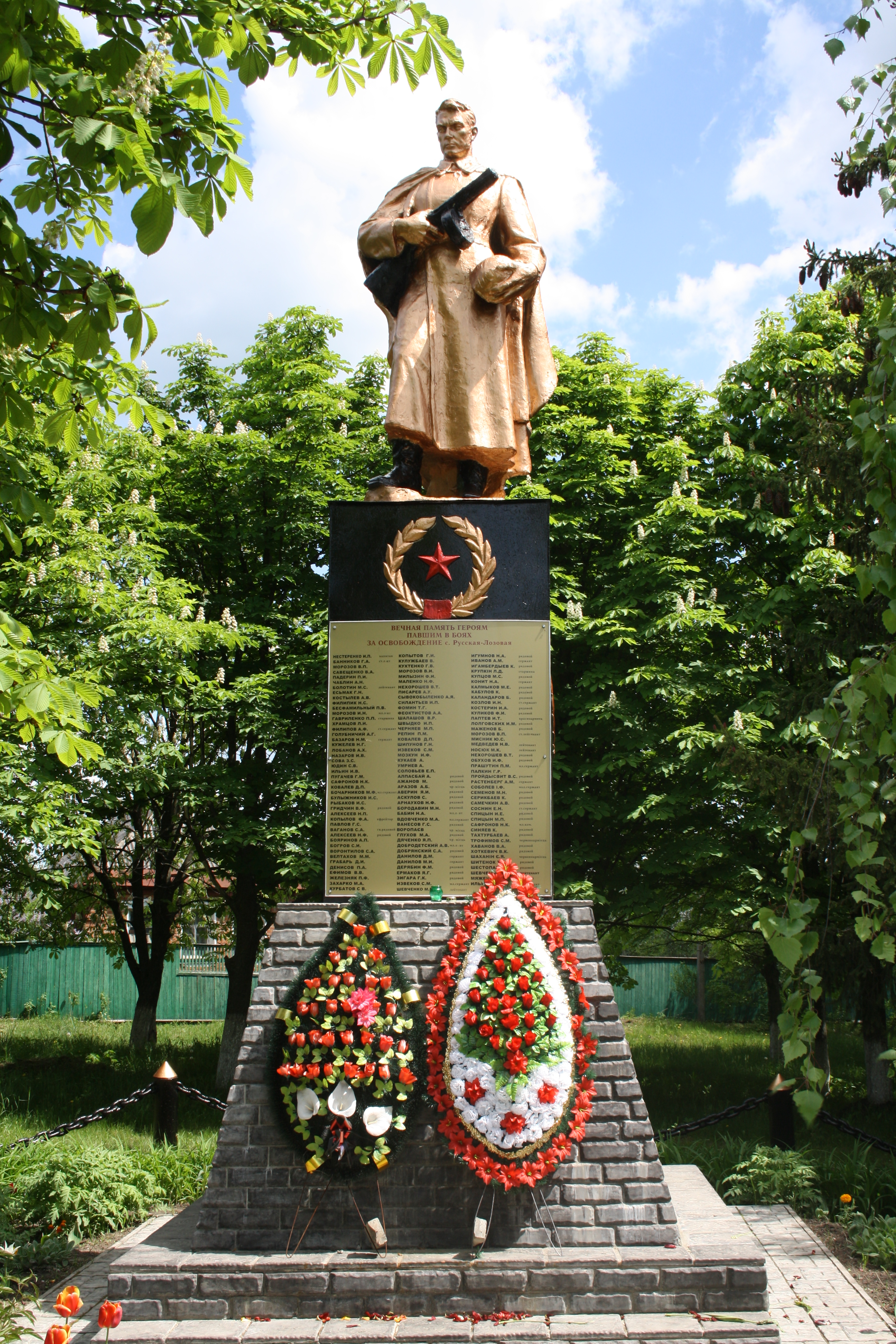
Monument to the liberators of the village during World War II

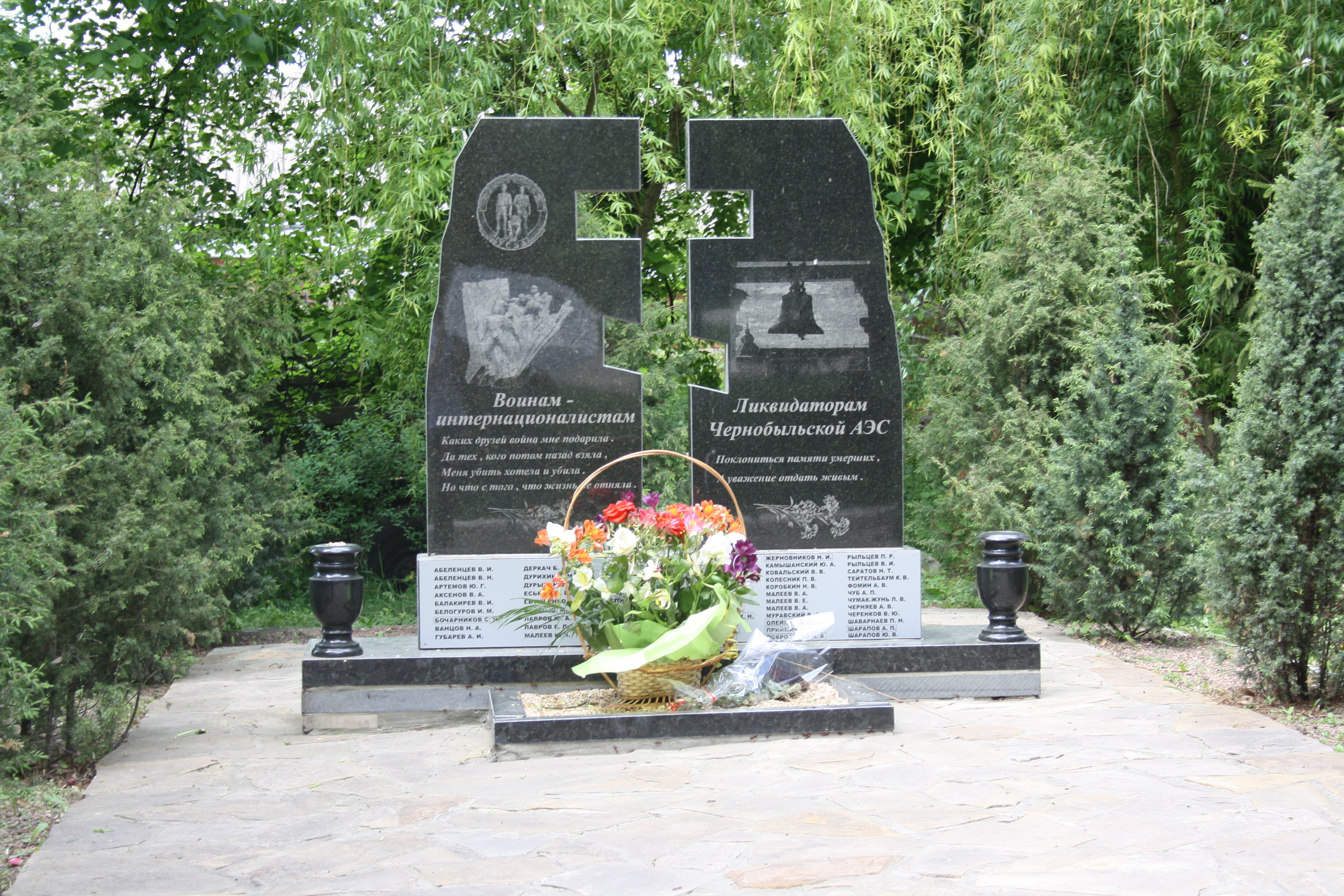
Monument to the responders during the Chernobyl disaster

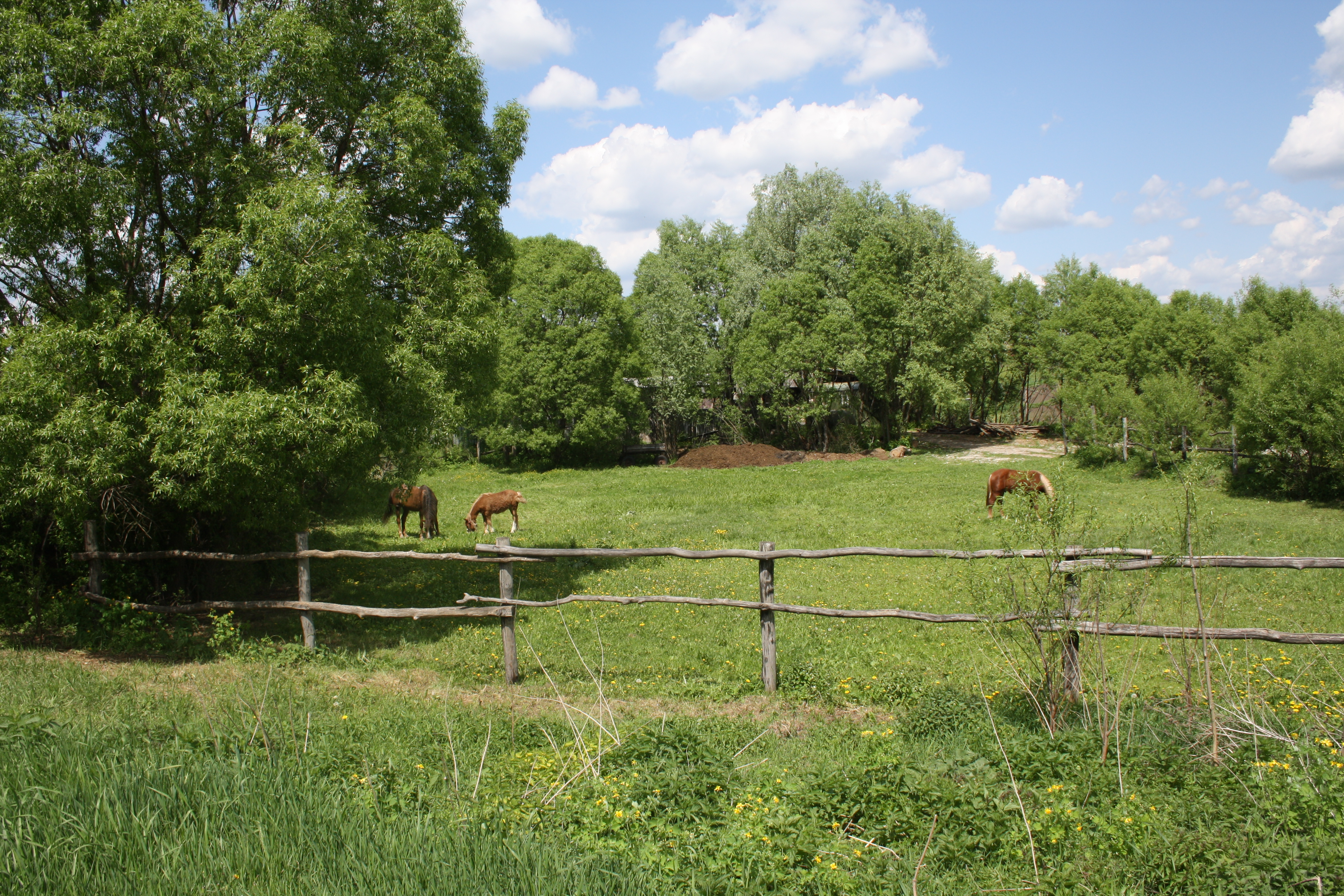
Horse pasture
