= Hoptivka =

Village in Kharkiv Oblast, Ukraine

Hoptivka Гоптівка
- Village
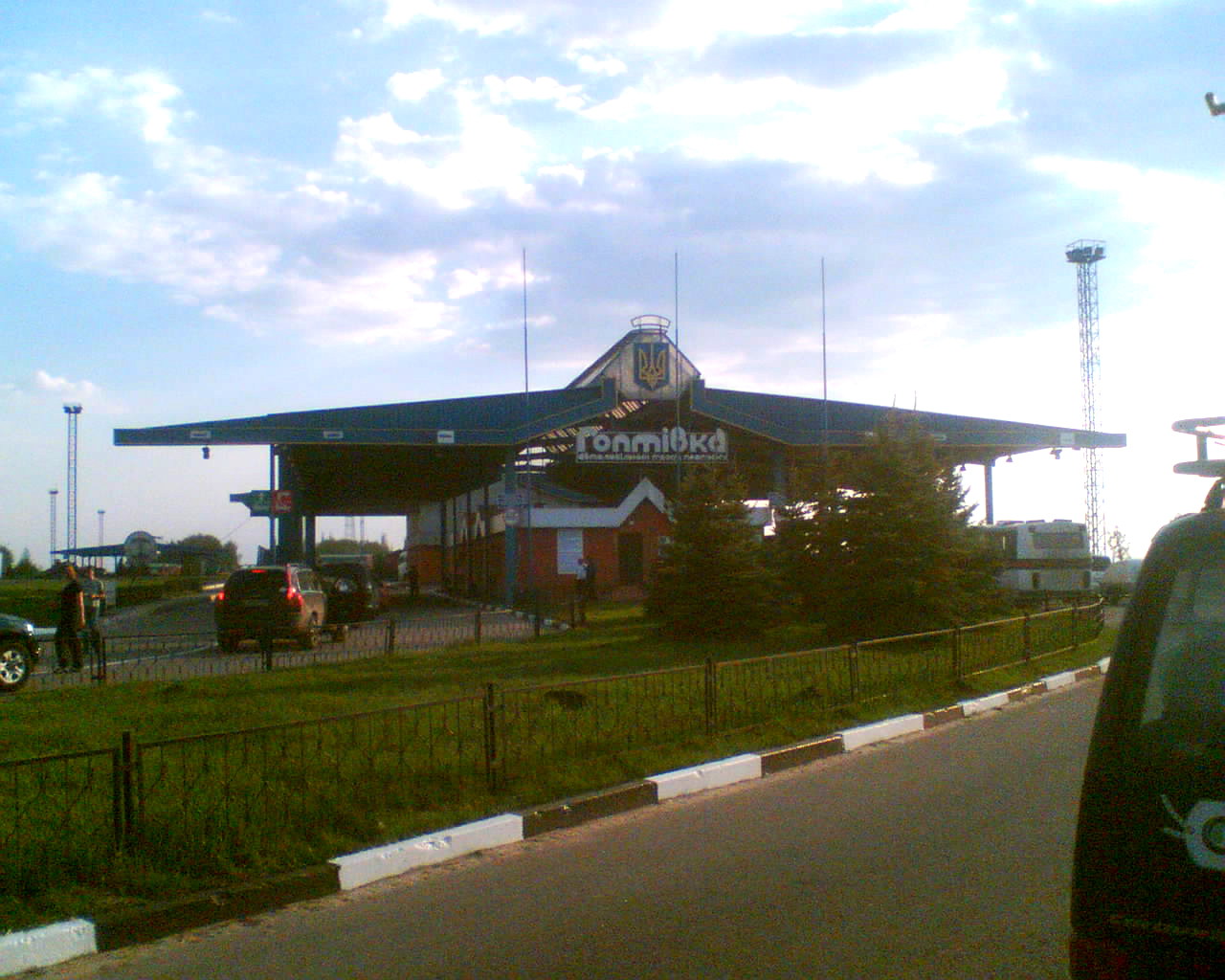
- "Hoptivka" border crossing
- Interactive map of Hoptivka
- Location of Hoptivka within Ukraine Hoptivka (Kharkiv Oblast)
- Coordinates: 50°17′04″N 36°16′12″E
- Country: Ukraine
- Oblast: Kharkiv Oblast
- Raion: Kharkiv Raion
- Hromada: Derhachi urban hromada
- Founded: 1850

Area
  - Total: 1.273 km^{2} (0.492 sq mi)
- Elevation: 158 m (518 ft)

Population (2001 census)
  - Total: 999
  - Density: 785/km^{2} (2,030/sq mi)
- Time zone: UTC+2 (EET)
  - Summer (DST): UTC+3 (EEST)
- Postal code: 62313
- Area code: +380 5763
- KATOTTH: UA63120070120011322

Hoptivka (Ukrainian: Гоптівка, Russian: Гоптовка) is a village in Kharkiv Raion, Kharkiv Oblast, Ukraine and a northeastern border crossing with Russia.

== Border crossing ==
The M2 highway is the primary border crossing, which meets the M20 in Ukraine.

== History ==
=== Russian invasion of Ukraine ===
During the initial eastern campaign of the 2022 Russian invasion of Ukraine, the village was occupied by Russia on or about 25 February 2022, and was subsequently retaken by Ukrainian forces on or about 11 September 2022 during its 2022 Kharkiv counteroffensive.

Hoptivka came under direct attack again by Russian forces on 10 May 2024 during Russia's 2024 Kharkiv offensive, with unverified reports from Russian military bloggers claiming that the village was captured on 11 May 2024. On 15 May 2024, the village was confirmed to be under Russian control. Later on the village was recaptured by Ukrainian forces and on 4 August 2025 Russian soldiers who had attempted to assault the Hoptivka border checkpoint were repelled.

== Local government ==
Until 18 July 2020, Hoptivka belonged to Derhachi Raion. The raion was abolished in July 2020 as part of the administrative reform of Ukraine, which reduced the number of raions of Kharkiv Oblast to seven. The area of Derhachi Raion was merged into Kharkiv Raion.

It belongs to Derhachi urban hromada, one of the hromadas of Ukraine.

== Demographics ==
As of the 2001 Ukrainian census, the settlement had 999 inhabitants, whose native languages were 69.47% Ukrainian, 30.23% Russian and 0.30% Armenian.
