= Tokarivka =

Tokarivka may refer to several settlements in Ukraine:

- Tokarivka, Kharkiv Raion, Kharkiv Oblast
- Tokarivka, Kupiansk Raion, Kharkiv Oblast
- Tokarivka, Voznesensk Raion, Mykolaiv Oblast
