= Derhachi urban hromada =

Administrative unit in Kharkiv Oblast, Ukraine

Derhachi urban hromada Дергачівська міська громада
- Hromada
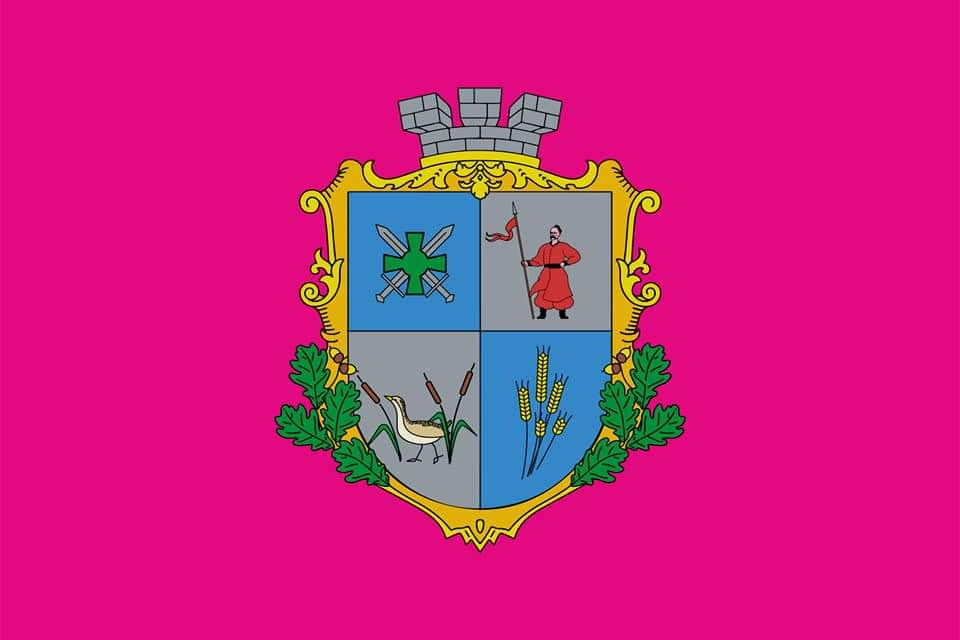
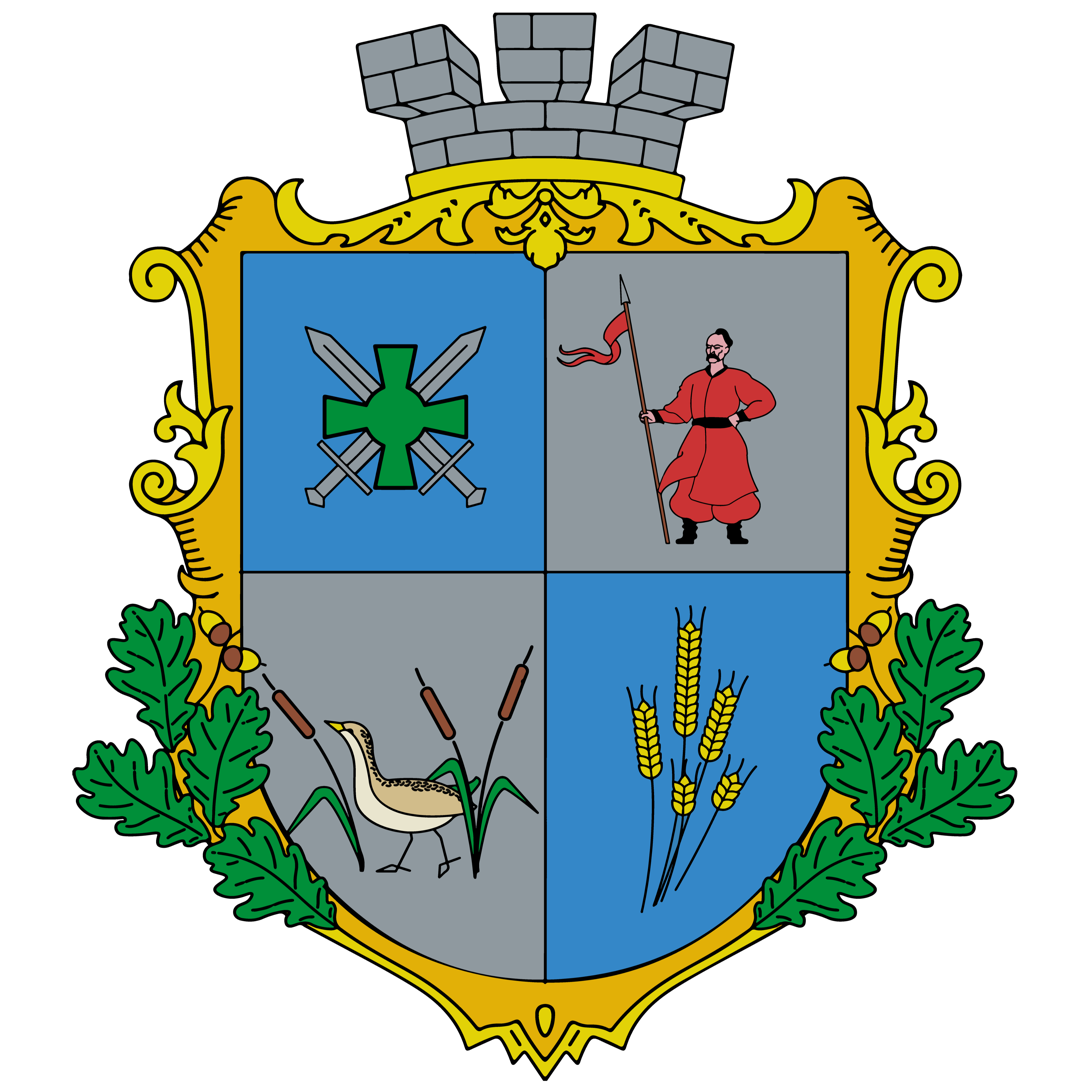
- Flag Seal
- Interactive map of Derhachi urban hromada
- Country: Ukraine
- Oblast: Kharkiv
- Raion: Kharkiv

Government
  - Head: Vyacheslav Valentynovych Zadorenko

Population (2022)
  - Total: 42,823
- Settlements: 38
- Cities: 1
- Rural settlements: 6
- Villages: 31

Derhachi urban hromada is a hromada (municipality) of Ukraine, in Kharkiv Raion of Kharkiv Oblast. The administrative center is the city of Derhachi. Population: 42,823 (2022 estimate).

Until 18 July 2020, the hromada belonged to Derhachi Raion. The raion was abolished in July 2020 as part of the administrative reform of Ukraine, which reduced the number of raions or districts in the Kharkiv Oblast to seven. The area of Derhachi Raion was merged into Kharkiv Raion.

The hromada contains 1 city (Derhachi), 6 rural settlements (Kozacha Lopan, Prudianka, Slatyne, Vetarynarne, Nova, and Pytomnyk) and 31 villages:

- Alisivka
- Bilashi
- Bezruky
- Bolyboky
- Buhayivka
- Velyki Prokhody
- Vysoka Yaruga
- Hoptivka
- Hraniv
- Dementiivka
- Dubivka
- Yemtsi
- Zamirtsi
- Kochubeivka
- Kudiivka
- Leshchenky
- Lobanivka
- Mali Prokhody
- Maslii
- Myshchenky
- Nova Kozacha
- Ruska Lozova
- Semenivka
- Solonyi Yar
- Tokarivka
- Tokarivka Druha
- Tsupivka
- Shapovalivka
- Shevchenka
- Shovkopliasy
- Shopyne

== Symbolism ==
Approved on December 3, 2021 at the session of the Dergachiv City Council.

=== Coat of arms ===
The shield of the coat of arms uses a cross-division of the field. The tinctures (backgrounds) of the field - silver and azure - are arranged in a checkerboard pattern. On the upper azure tincture is the symbol of the border status of the Dergachiv community - a straight equilateral cross with diverging green ends and two silver crossed swords with the tips pointing upwards. On the upper silver tincture is a Ukrainian Cossack in national clothing with a pike in his right hand, turned heraldically to the right, which personifies the historical heritage of the Dergachiv region.

On the lower azure tincture are five golden ears of wheat, symbolizing the agrarian potential of the Dergachiv region. The lower silver tincture contains historical symbols of local flora and fauna - a natural-colored warbler bird among reeds. On the right and left sides of the shield, the cartouche is framed by oak leaves and acorns - symbols of the wealth of green spaces of the Dergachi region.

=== Flag ===
The flag of the Dergachi community has the appearance of a rectangular crimson cloth, in the center of which is the coat of arms in the form of a heraldic shield with a rounded lower part in a gold cartouche, symbolizing the wealth of the community. The cartouche is crowned with a silver city masonry crown with three teeth.
