= Kozacha Lopan =

Rural locality in Kharkiv Oblast, Ukraine

Kozacha Lopan Козача Лопань
- Rural settlement
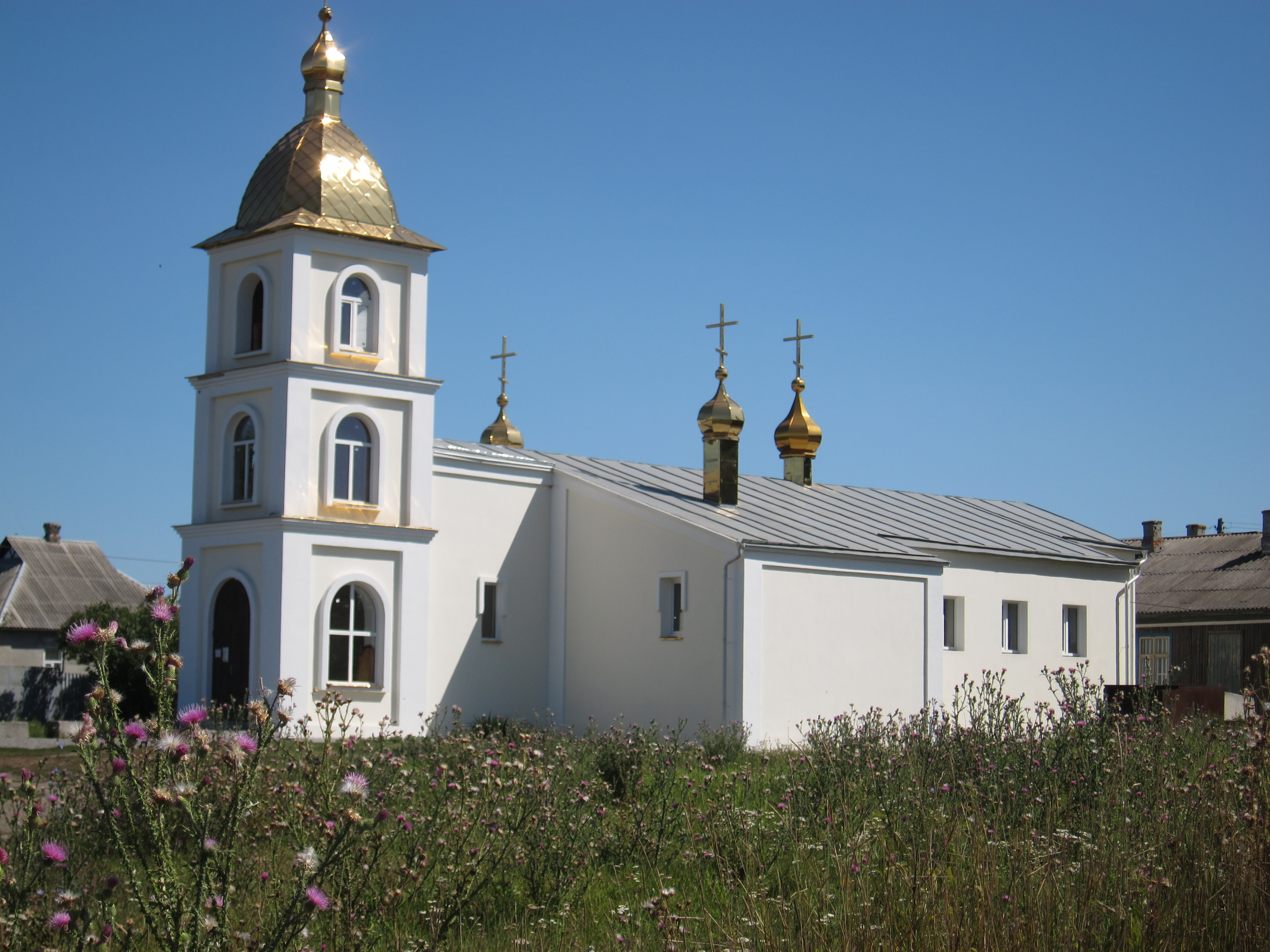
- Church of Saint Archangel Michael

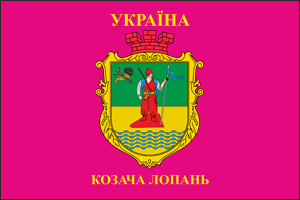
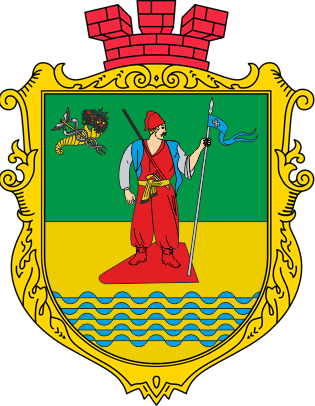
- Flag Coat of arms
- Interactive map of Kozacha Lopan
- Location in Kharkiv Oblast Location in Ukraine
- Coordinates: 50°19′55″N 36°11′37″E
- Country: Ukraine
- Oblast: Kharkiv Oblast
- Raion: Kharkiv Raion
- Hromada: Derhachi urban hromada
- Established: 1660

Area
  - Total: 0.96 km^{2} (0.37 sq mi)
- Elevation: 144 m (472 ft)

Population (2022)
  - Total: 4,935
  - Estimate (03.08.2026): 63
  - Density: 5,100/km^{2} (13,000/sq mi)
- Time zone: UTC+2 (EET)
  - Summer (DST): UTC+3 (EEST)
- Post Code: 62312
- Area code: +380 5763

Kozacha Lopan (Ukrainian: Козача Лопань, pronounced [koˈzɑtʃɐ ˈlɔpɐnʲ]; Russian: Казачья Лопань), called Lopan in the 18th–19th centuries, is a rural settlement in Kharkiv Raion, Kharkiv Oblast, Ukraine. It is located on the banks of the Lopan in the drainage basin of the Don, about 5 kilometres (3.1 mi) from the border with Russia. Kozacha Lopan belongs to Derhachi urban hromada, one of the hromadas of Ukraine. Population: 4,935 (2022 estimate).

== Geography ==
The village of Kozacha Lopan is located on both banks of the Lopan river, 2 kilometers from the border with Russia. Upstream is the village of Shevchenka; 1 kilometer away is the village of Hraniv; and 3 kilometers downstream is the village of Nova Kozacha.

== History ==
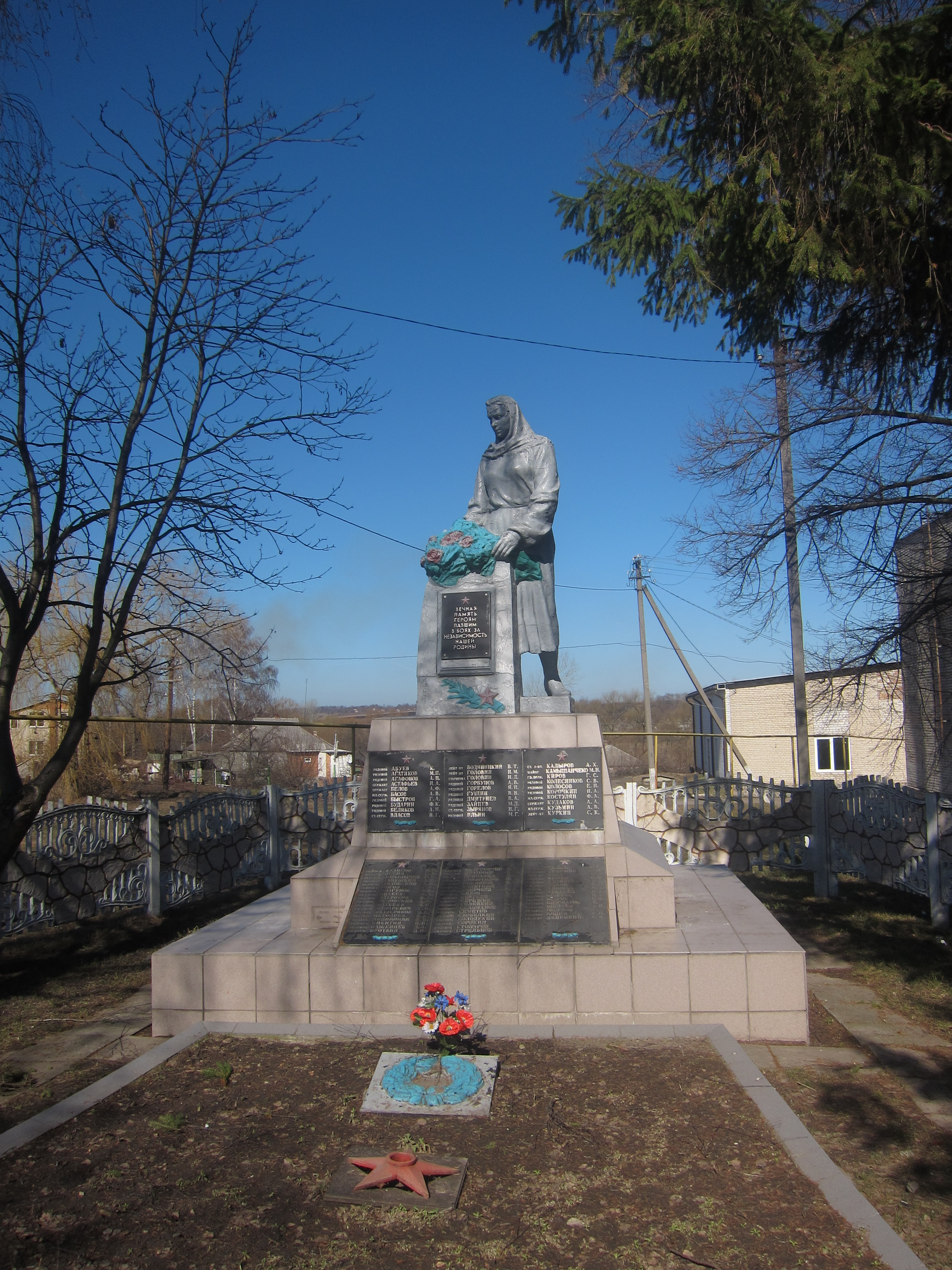
Mass grave of the Red Army soldiers.

The remains of three Bronze Age settlements and two Scythian settlements have been discovered in Kazachya Lopan. The first historical information about the village back to the 1660s. The population of the Lopan settlement in 1779, according to the bulletin of which cities and districts the Kharkov Viceroyalty was composed of and how many people lived in them in 1779, was quite large, at 868 people (only men were counted). Thus, that year Lopan was the fourth most populous settlement in the Zolochiv Uyezd, behind only the town of Olshana (2,695 p), the settlement of Dementiivka (1,176 p.), and the village of Udy (973 p).

Until 1917, the village was the administrative center of the Kazachye-Lopanskaya volost of the Kharkovsky Uyezd, Kharkov Governorate, Russian Empire. Soviet power was established in December 1917. In late 1918, near Kazachya Lopan, Red Army in one of the battles defeated units of the UPR army. During the fight against Denikin's forces in June 1919, the entire party organization joined the ranks of the Red Army.

From 1922 to 1924, three agricultural cooperatives were established in the village. In 1938, the village's status was upgraded from a village to an urban-type settlement. In 1940, there were 1,595 households in "Kazachya Lopan", the "Shlyakh (Put) Industria" state farm, and a flour mill (in Turovo).

During World War II, Kazachya Lopan was occupied by German troops. As Soviet troops approached in 1943, the village was converted by the Germans into a fortified stronghold. In early August 1943, Kazachya Lopan became the site of fierce fighting. It changed hands several times and was completely razed by the Germans. It was finally liberated on August 10, 1943. In Kazachya Lopan in mid-August 1943, during the liberation of Kharkov from the German occupation, the headquarters of the 233rd Rifle Division of the Steppe Front of the Red Army was located.

A total of 410 residents fought against the enemy on the war fronts and in partisan detachments, 334 of whom were awarded orders and medals of the USSR for their courage and bravery. 196 people were killed. An obelisk commemorating the communists and Komsomol members who perished during the civil war and four monuments to Soviet soldiers "who fell in battle to liberate the village from the Nazis" were erected in Kazachya Lopan.

In 1966, the population was 10,600. In 1972, the "Put' Industrii" seed-growing state farm (4,512 hectares of land), the Michurin collective farm (3,487 hectares), and a milk processing plant operated here. In January 1989 the population was 7,235 people (3,223 men and 4,012 women).

After the declaration of independence of Ukraine, the village found itself on the border with Russia, a border crossing and customs office were established here, which are in the area of responsibility of the Kharkiv border detachment of the Eastern regional administration of the State Border Service of Ukraine. In July 1995, the Cabinet of Ministers of Ukraine approved a decision to privatize the state farm and the inter-collective farm specialized farm "Agronom" located here. As of January 1, 2013, the population was 5,334 people.

Until 18 July 2020, Kozacha Lopan belonged to Derhachi Raion. The raion was abolished in July 2020 as part of the administrative reform of Ukraine, which reduced the number of raions of Kharkiv Oblast to seven. The area of Derhachi Raion was merged into Kharkiv Raion.

In March 2022, after the start of the Russian invasion of Ukraine, the settlement was occupied by the Russian army. As part of the invasion, Russian forces shelled residential areas in Kozacha Lopan. On 11 September, the local authorities reported that the Ukrainian army had recaptured Kozacha Lopan.

Until 26 January 2024, Kozacha Lopan was designated urban-type settlement. On this day, a new law entered into force which abolished this status, and Kozacha Lopan became a rural settlement. On 2 September 2026, Russian forces said it had captured the settlement. The Ukrainian head of the military administration of Derhachi urban hromada, Viacheslav Zadorenko, responded saying that the majority of the settlement was under Ukrainian control, but that Russian infiltrators were engaging in flag planting for drone footage, which is enough for Russian sources to report success. According to Zadorenko, the infiltrators were being killed minutes after unfurling their flags.

== Demographics ==
As of the 2001 Ukrainian census, Kozacha Lopan had a population of 5,878 inhabitants. The linguistic composition of the settlement was as follows:

Native languages in Kozacha Lopan
| | percent |
| Ukrainian | 86.3% |
| Russian | 13.0% |
| Armenian | 0.2% |
| Belarusian | 0.1% |
| others | 0.3% |

== Economy ==
=== Production ===
- Dairy and poultry farms;
- Gora animal farm;
- Kazachanka-2 gardening association.

=== Transportation ===
Kozacha Lopan railway station is on the railway connecting Kharkiv and Belgorod. There is local passenger traffic in the direction of Kharkiv, and long-distance trains connecting Kharkiv with Russia. Kozacha Lopan is the last station on the Ukrainian side, and here border and custom controls take place.

The settlement has road access to Highway M20 which connects Kharkiv with the Russian border and continues across the border to Belgorod. Route 1648T buses and commuter trains run along the route (Kozacha Lopan - Kharkiv).

== Social sphere ==
- "Podsolnukh" Preschool;
- Kozacholopan Lyceum School;
- Hospital;
- Stadium;
- Museum of Military Glory;
- Church of St. Michael the Archangel.

== Attractions ==
- "Stary Sad" Local Entomological Reserve (5.0 hectares).
- "Kushchevatoe" - burial mounds from the Scythian period.
- 4 mass graves of Soviet soldiers.
- Monument to the Victims of Nazi Terror (1941-43).
