= M2 highway (Russia) =

Federal highway in Russia

Federal Highway M2
- Федеральная автомобильная дорога М2
- Crimea Highway

Route information
- Part of E105
- Length: 720 km (450 mi)
- Existed: 1950–present

Major junctions
- West end: Ukrainian border
- East end: MKAD in Moscow

Location
- Country: Russia

Highway system
- Russian Federal Highways
← M 1	→ M 3

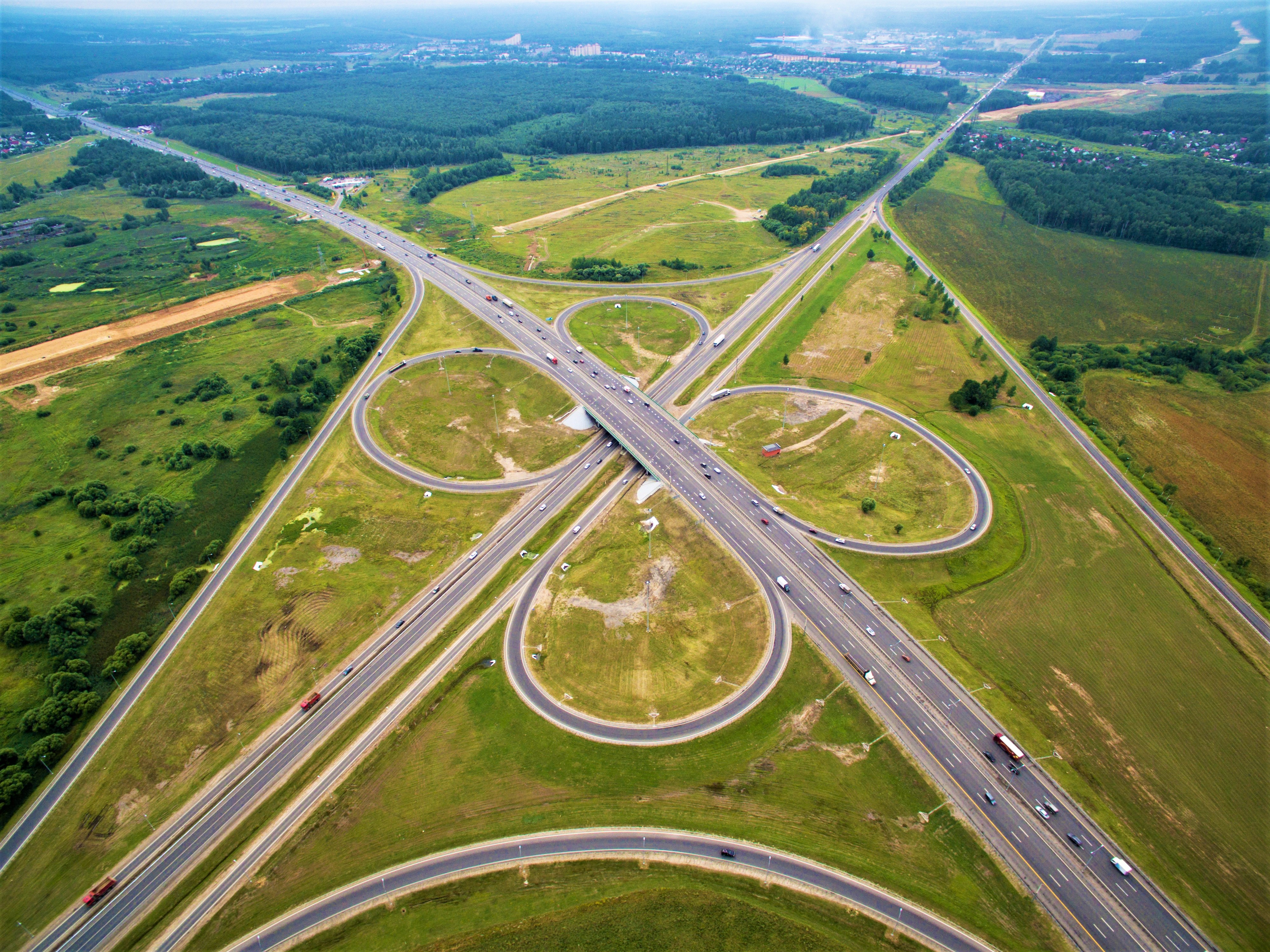
Transportation interchange at the intersection of M-2 and A-107, the "Moscow Small Ring" (August 2017)

The Russian route M2 (also known as the Crimea Highway, (автодорога "Крым")) is a major trunk road that connects Moscow to Crimea. It is part of the European route E105. It is 720 kilometers long.

Inaugurated in 1950, the highway starts at the junction of the Moscow Ring Road and Varshavskoye Shosse and travels south-west, immediately bypassing the cities of Tula, Oryol, Kursk and Belgorod before terminating at the border with Ukraine.

West of the border at Hoptivka, the road continues through Kharkiv and Zaporizhia to Simferopol and Yalta as the Ukrainian M20 and M18.

== See also ==
- Berlinka, the never-completed Reichsautobahn Berlin-Königsberg of the Third Reich into East Prussia.
