= Derhachi =

City in Kharkiv Oblast, Ukraine

Derhachi Дергачі
- City
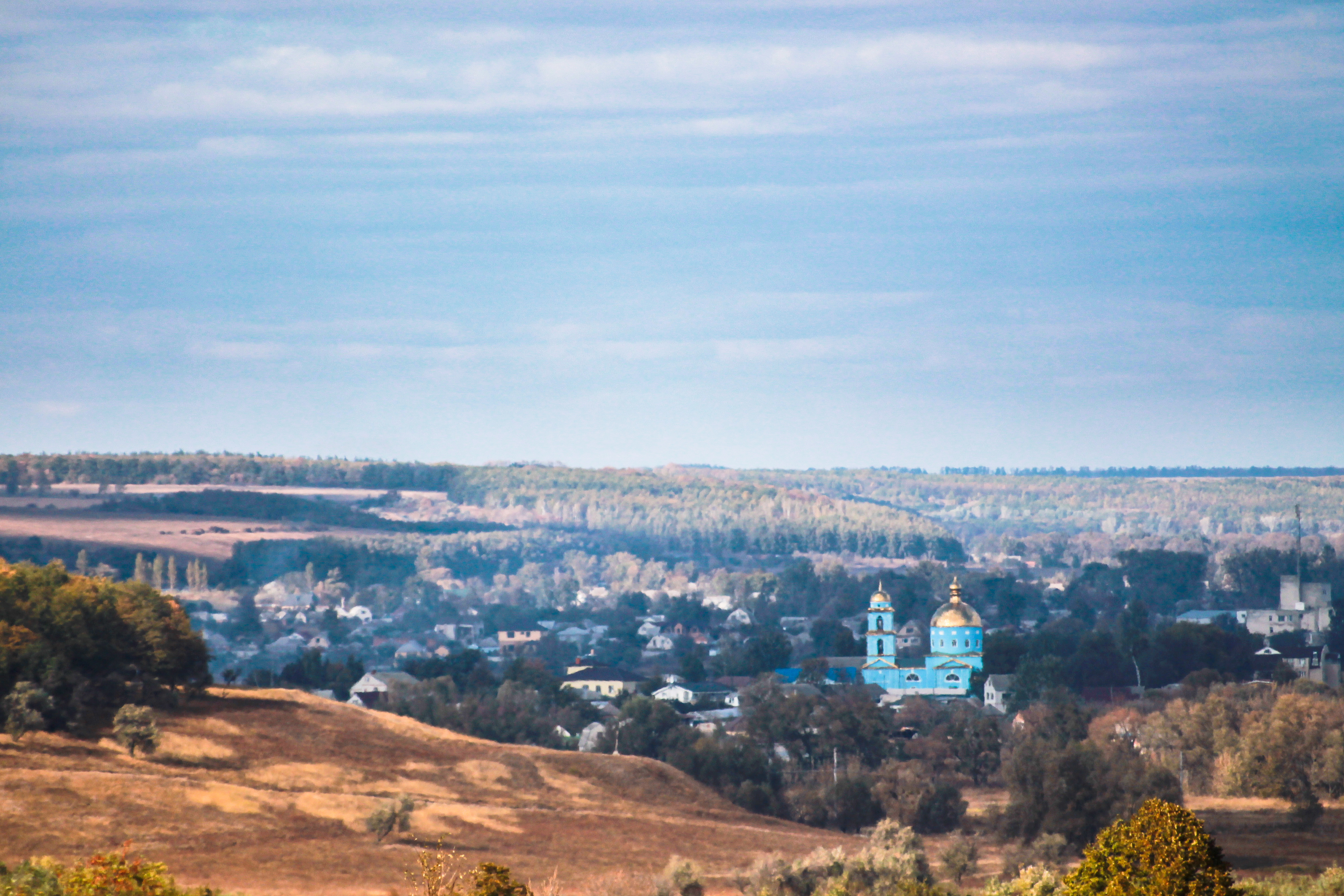
- A view over north-west Derhachi

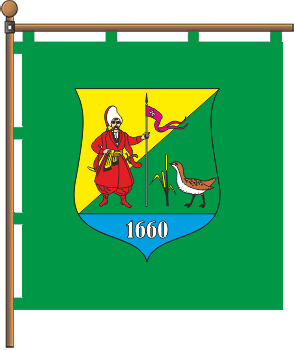
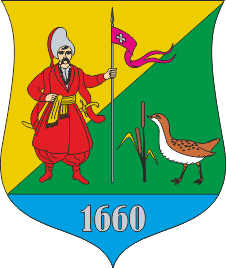
- Flag Coat of arms
- Interactive map of Derhachi
- Location within Kharkiv Oblast Location within Ukraine
- Coordinates: 50°07′N 36°07′E
- Country: Ukraine
- Oblast: Kharkiv Oblast
- Raion: Kharkiv Raion
- Hromada: Derhachi urban hromada
- Established: 1660

Area
  - Total: 19.1 km^{2} (7.4 sq mi)
- Elevation: 122 m (400 ft)

Population (2022)
  - Total: 17,139
  - Density: 897/km^{2} (2,320/sq mi)
- Time zone: UTC+2 (EET)
  - Summer (DST): UTC+3 (EEST)
- Postal code: 62309
- Area code: +380 5763

Derhachi (Ukrainian: Дергачі, pronounced [derɦɐˈtʃi]; Russian: Дeргaчи, romanized: Dergachi) is a city in Kharkiv Raion, Kharkiv Oblast, eastern Ukraine. The town is 12 km (7 mi) northwest of the administrative center of the oblast, Kharkiv. The settlement was founded in the second half of the 17th century as a sloboda. It hosts the administration of Derhachi urban hromada, one of the hromadas of Ukraine. Population: 17,139 (2022 estimate).

== Etymology ==
There are at least two versions of the origin of the town name. The first is connected with the term derkach, the Ukrainian name for the corncrake that inhabits the banks of the local Lopan river. Another version links the name to that of a legendary cossack Derkach who, it said, was the town's founder. After 1943, the Soviet local authorities rejected the Ukrainian variant of the name with letter к and began to use only the Russian version, with the letter г (Dergachi in Russian; Derhachi in Ukrainian). Later, the Russian-influenced spelling was officially installed in Ukrainian official settlements classification. Currently, there is an initiative to return the historic name Derkachi.

== Geography ==
=== Location ===
The town lies in the valley of the Lopan river, north-west of Ukraine's second-largest city Kharkiv. Most of the town is located on the plain, on the left bank of Lopan River. The western edge of the settlement is hilly and full of ravines. The Lopan riverbed has many artificial channels and small tributaries at this point. The T2103 Regional Highway passes through Derhachi from the north-west to south-east, connecting it with Kharkiv and Zolochiv. There is an extensive uninhabited and forested area to the south-west of the town.

=== Climate ===
Derhachi has a humid continental climate, Dfb by Köppen climate classification, with warm summers, but it lacks a dry season. The average annual temperature is 7.3 °C. Annual rainfall is around 535 mm.

== History ==
=== The Scythian period (500-200 BC) ===
It has been established that the present area of today's town was populated in Scythian times (6th–3rd centuries B.C.) and later. A unique Scythian ritual pommel decorated with a sphinx was found in the town. This artefact formed part of a Scythian World Tree and is now on show at the Kharkiv Historical Museum. In 2018 and 2019, an archaeological expedition from Kharkiv Historical Museum carried out excavations of the Scythian kurgan or burial mound in the western part of Derhachi. Scholars examined the mounds and put together a collection of items that provided information about the funeral rites of the Scythian period.

=== Modern period ===
In the 17th century, Derkachi was a sotnia town of the Kharkiv Sloboda Cossack Regiment. Up to 1742 there was one cossacks sotnia administration there; from 1742 to 1765 there were two. Traditionally, a sotnyk (head of a sotnia) in Derkachi was a member of a family, well known in Sloboda Ukraine, the Kowalewskis (Dołęga coat of arms). The town had its own symbols. The sotnia standard used an image of the Archangel Michael. The town seal contained an image of the derkach (corn crake) surmounted by an octagram. According to 1779 documents, Derkachi was a military sloboda of the Kharkiv povit (uyezd) with a population of 2,287 citizens.

During Tsarist times, Derkachi was a settlement within Kharkov Governorate of the Russian Empire. During the Ukrainian War of Independence, from 1917 to 1920, it passed between various factions. Afterwards it was administratively part of the Kharkiv Governorate of Ukraine.

=== Soviet times ===
At least 274 of the town's residents died in the Holodomor, the man-made famine in Soviet Ukraine in 1932 and 1933. The officials of Derkachi town council were involved in expropriation of local citizens property in 1932.

Derhachi spent 630 days during the Eastern Front under the occupation of the German Army, from 21 October 1941 to 13 August 1943; save for a period during the Third Battle of Kharkov in February 1943 when it was briefly recaptured by the Red Army. The town would be liberated later that year during the Belgorod–Kharkov offensive operation. In 1942, the German occupiers operated the Dulag 205 transit prisoner-of-war camp in Derhachi.

In January 1989, the town's population was 22,915 people.

=== Independent Ukraine ===
In January 2013, the town population was 18,154 people. On September 28, 2014, a monument to Lenin was toppled in the city, parallel to the regional center, by unknown masked youths.

Until 18 July 2020, Derhachi was the administrative center of Derhachi Raion. The raion was abolished in July 2020 as part of the administrative reform of Ukraine, which reduced the number of raions or districts in the Kharkiv Oblast to seven. The area of Derhachi Raion was merged into Kharkiv Raion.

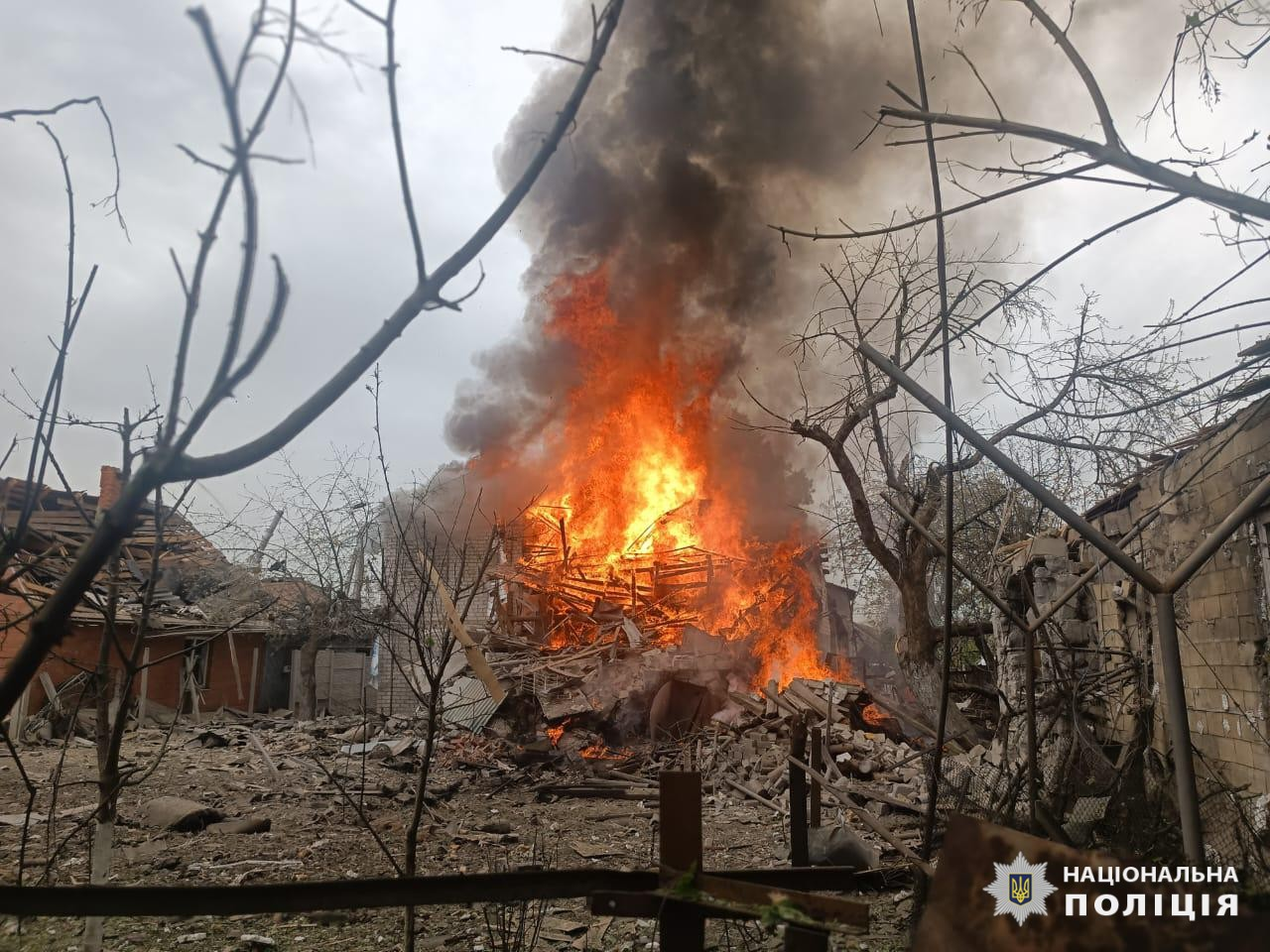
Destructions in Derhachi after Russian bombing, 2024

During the 2022 Russian invasion of Ukraine, the town saw shelling and fighting as part of the battle of Kharkiv, resulting in civilian casualties. On 12 May 2022, the local palace of culture was shelled by a BM-27 Uragan MLRS, killing two people and wounding four. Later, on the night of May 12–13, the building was completely destroyed by a missile strike. Russian troops failed to occupy Derhachi, unlike large swaths of Kharkiv Oblast. In September 2023, a shield bearing the inscription "Derkachi - the shield of the defense of Kharkiv" was installed at the base of a monument to the purported founder of the city, Cossack Derkach.

== Demographics ==
As of the 2001 Ukrainian census, Derhachi counted a population of 20,196 inhabitants. The exact ethnic and linguistic composition was as follows:

Ethnic groups in Derhachi
	percent
Ukrainians	86.67%
Russians	12.06%
Belarusians	0.31%
Armenians	0.11%
others	0.19%

Native languages in Derhachi
Languages	percent
Ukrainian	87.5%
Russian	11.8%
Belarusian	0.1%
others	0.4%

== Transportation ==
=== Trains ===
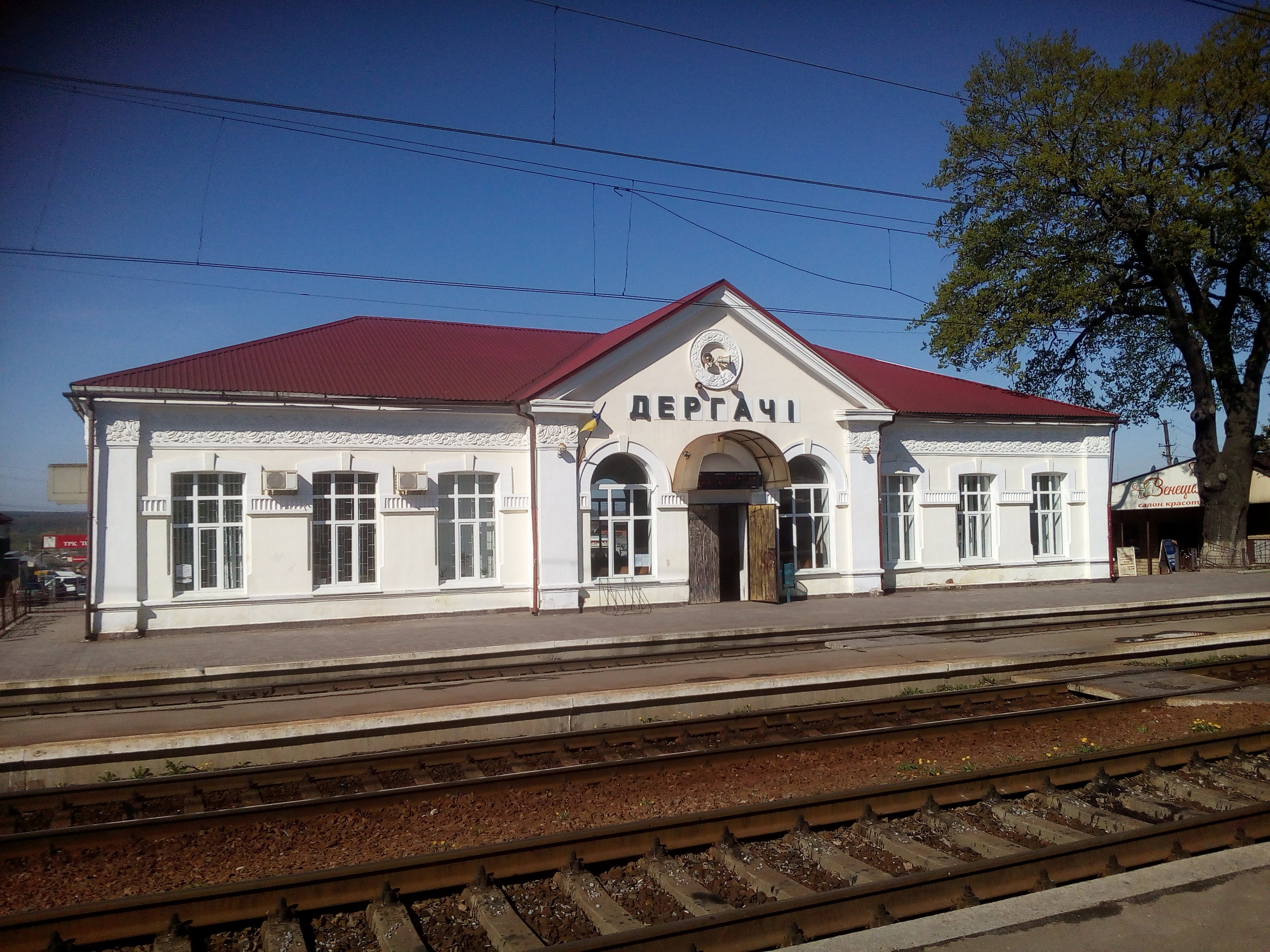
The railway station building in Derhachi

The town has 3 railway stops operated by Ukrainian Railways: Derhachi, Motorna and Novi Derhachi. The largest stop Derhachi has a station building. All stops are used only by commuter trains running on the line Kharkiv - Kozacha Lopan. Before 2014 there was a direct commuter train connection with towns in the adjacent Belhorod Region of Russia.

=== Buses ===
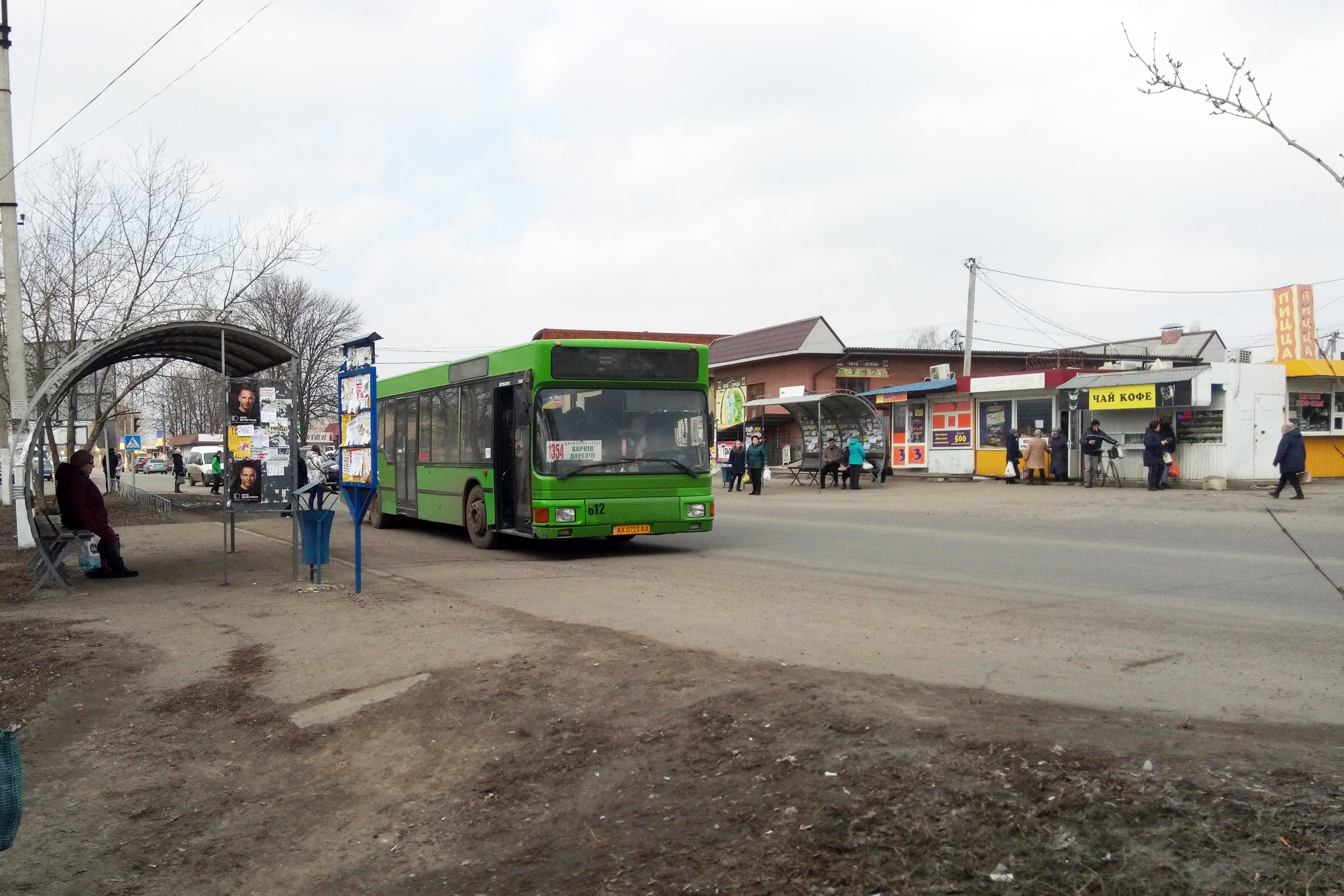
A bus at a stop in Derhachi

Derhachi has a bus connection with the city of Kharkiv. The buses on this route go via the central street Sumsky Shliakh, then pass through the town of Mala Danylivka to the center of Kharkiv (bus station Tsentralnyi Rynok).

Derhachi also has an internal town bus route, which mainly runs along the central streets (Sumskyi Shliakh and Zolochivskyi Shliakh). The town has a direct connection with the neighboring raion center Zolochiv.

=== Metro ===
In the 1980s, when planning the Oleksiivska line of the Kharkiv Metro, it was planned to build a Dergachi metro station, but it has not yet been constructed.

== Economy ==
Most enterprises are concentrated in the industrial zone in south Derhachi, near the Motorna railway halt.

The largest enterprises in the town are: the UBC Group which manufactures refrigeration and brewing equipment and Amcor which produces packaging for the tobacco industry.

Derhachi is the manufacturing base of the BRIG company, one of the world's leading manufacturers of rigid-hulled inflatable boats.

== Notable people ==
=== Born in the town ===
- Panas (Afanasi) Matushenko who led the mutiny on the Russian battleship Potemkin in 1905.

=== Lived or worked in the town ===
- Hnat Khotkevych was a Ukrainian writer, ethnographer, composer, and bandurist. As a student in 1895, he organized a village theater in Derkachi. In 1920-1928 he taught Ukrainian language and literature in the Derkachi zoo technical school
- Oleksandr Oles was a Ukrainian writer and poet. In 1893 he entered the agricultural college in Derkachi, where he published the first verses.

== Media ==
Since Soviet times, the town has had a newspaper, established in 1939 by the local Communist Party committee.

The newspaper has changed its name five times since then (see below):

- By the way of Stalin (Ukrainian: Сталінським шляхом), 28 July 1939 – 4 November 1956;
- The truth of Lenin (Ukrainian: Ленінська правда), 1957–1962;
- The tribune of the working people (Ukrainian: Трибуна трудящих), 1962–1967;
- The way of Lenin (Ukrainian: Ленінський шлях), 1967-10 October 1991; and
- The news of Derhachi land (Ukrainian: Вісті Дергачівщини), since 10 October 1991

== Twin towns — Sister cities ==
Derhachi is twinned with:

- Sosnowiec, Silesian Voivodeship, Poland
