= Derhachi Raion =

Former subdivision of Kharkiv Oblast, Ukraine

Derhachi Raion Дергачівський район
- Raion
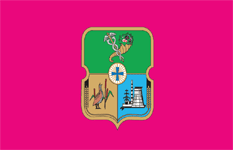
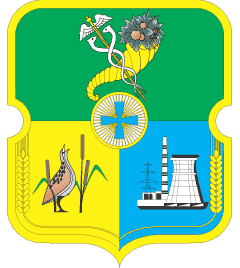
- Flag Coat of arms

- Raion location in Kharkiv Oblast
- Coordinates: 50°9′5.2452″N 36°8′25.152″E
- Country: Ukraine
- Oblast: Kharkiv Oblast
- Disestablished: 18 July 2020
- Admin. center: Derhachi

Area
  - Total: 900 km^{2} (350 sq mi)

Population (2020)
  - Total: 92,829
  - Density: 100/km^{2} (270/sq mi)
- Time zone: UTC+2 (EET)
  - Summer (DST): UTC+3 (EEST)
- Website: rayrada.gov.ua

Derhachi Raion (Ukrainian: Дергачівський район) was a raion (district) in Kharkiv Oblast of Ukraine. Its administrative center was the town of Derhachi. The raion was abolished on 18 July 2020 as part of the administrative reform of Ukraine, which reduced the number of raions of Kharkiv Oblast to seven. The area of Derhachi Raion was merged into Kharkiv Raion. The last estimate of the raion population was 92,829 (2020 est.)

== Subdivisions ==
At the time of disestablishment, the raion consisted of three hromadas:

- Derhachi urban hromada with the administration in Derhachi;
- Mala Danylivka settlement hromada with the administration in the urban-type settlement of Mala Danylivka;
- Solonytsivka settlement hromada with the administration in the urban-type settlement of Solonytsivka.

== Border crossings ==
=== Auto ===
E105 (Crimea highway, (Крым шоссе)): Hoptivka ( (Ukraine) Гоптівка, Дергачівський район, Ха́рківська о́бласть (Харківщина)) M 20 – Nekhoteyevka, Belgorodsky Raion, Belgorodskaya Oblast( (Russia) Нехотеевка, Белгородский райо́н, Белгоро́дская о́бласть) M 2

=== Railway ===
Kozacha Lopan ( (Ukraine) Козача Лопань, Дергачівський район, Ха́рківська о́бласть (Харківщина)) – Dolbino, Belgorodsky Raion, Belgorodskaya Oblast( (Russia) Долбино, Белгородский райо́н, Белгоро́дская о́бласть)

== See also ==
- Russia–Ukraine border
