= Highway M20 (Ukraine) =

Highway in Ukraine

Highway M20
- Автошлях М20
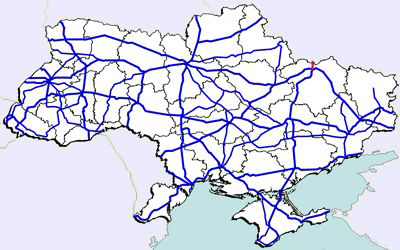

Route information
- Part of E105
- Length: 28.5 km (17.7 mi)

Major junctions
- South end: M 18 / M 03 in Kharkiv
- North end: Russian border at Hoptivka checkpoint

Location
- Country: Ukraine
- Oblasts: Kharkiv

Highway system
- Roads in Ukraine; State Highways
← M 19	→ M 21

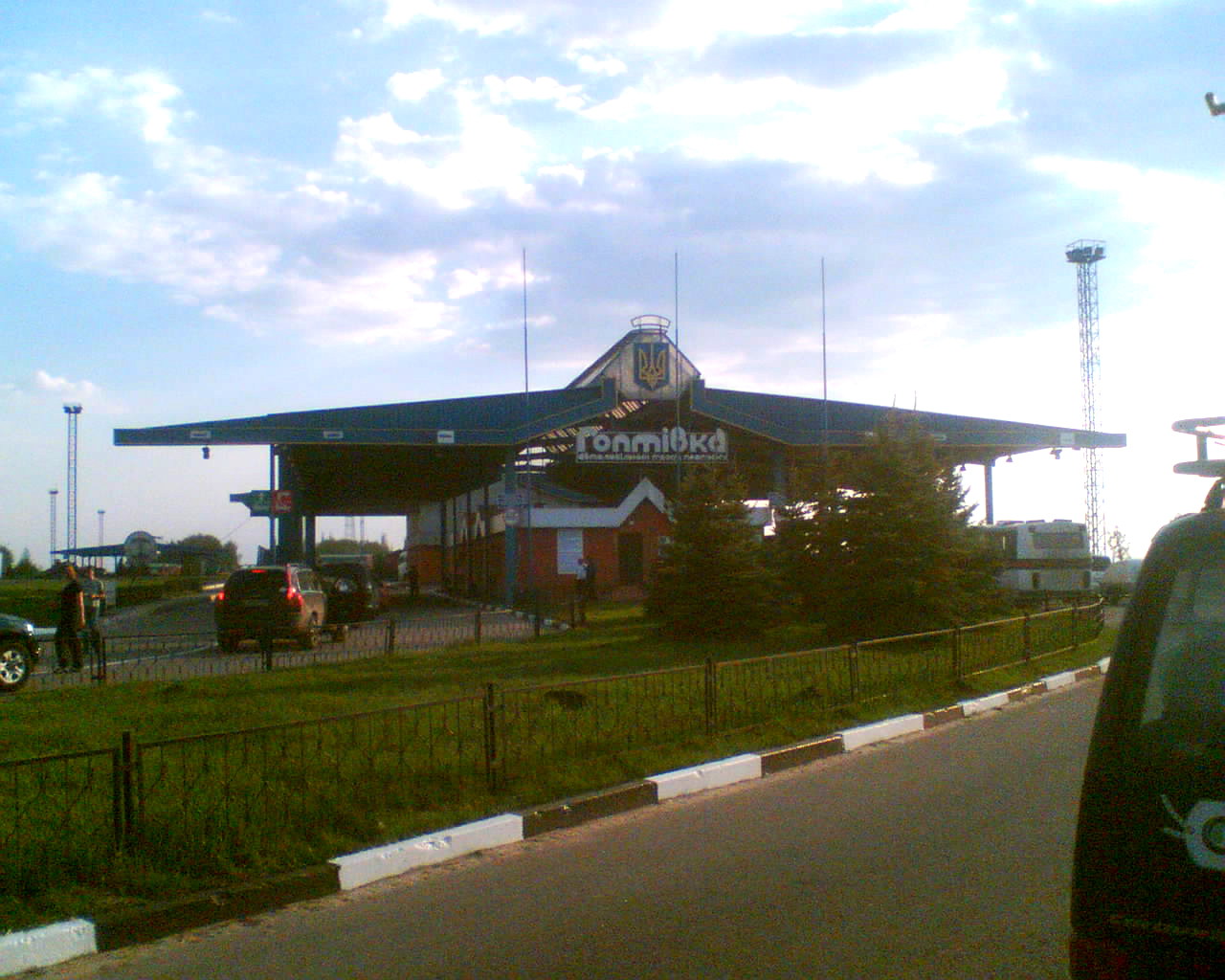
Hoptivka checkpoint on Ukraine-Russia border

Highway M20 is the second shortest Ukraine international highway (M-highway) which connects Kharkiv to the border with Russia at Hoptivka in Kharkiv Raion in Kharkiv Oblast (Kharkivshchyna) (Ukrainian: Дергачівський район, Ха́рківська о́бласть (Харківщина)) and Nehoteevka in Belgorodsky Raion in Belgorodskaya Oblast (Russian: Нехотеевка, Белгородский район, Белгоро́дская о́бласть). The section from Lisne to the Russian border is part of European route E105, known as the Crimea Highway (Крым шоссе) in Russia.

In 2011, major renovations took place on segments of the road in preparation to the Euro 2012.

== Route ==
Highway M20
Marker	Main settlements	Notes	Highway Interchanges
0 km	Kharkiv		M 18 • M 03
28 km	Hoptivka in Kharkiv Raion / Border (Russia)		M 2 (Russia)

== See also ==
- Roads in Ukraine
- Ukraine Highways
- International E-road network
- Pan-European corridors
