= Lopan =

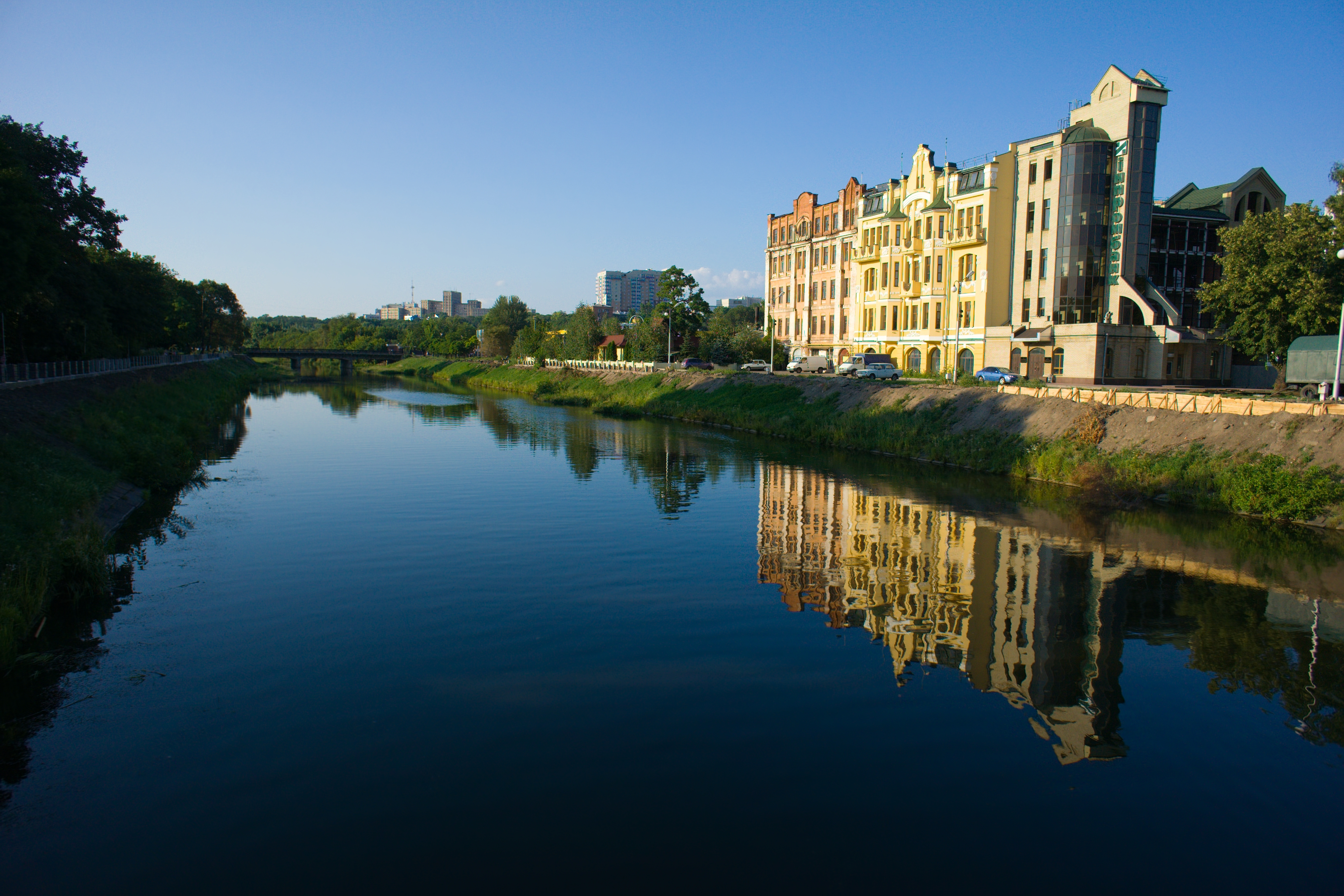
- The Lopan in Kharkiv, Ukraine
- Native name: Лопань (Russian)

Location
- Country: Russia, Ukraine

Physical characteristics
- Mouth: Udy
  - coordinates: 49.9370°N 36.2032°E
- Length: 93 km (58 mi)

Basin features
- Progression: Udy→ Donets→ Don→ Sea of Azov

The Lopan (Russian and Ukrainian: Лопань) is a river that rises in Belgorod Oblast of Russia and flows across the Russia–Ukraine border into Kharkiv Oblast where it joins the Udy in Kharkiv. The river is 93 kilometres (58 mi) long. The river Kharkiv is one of its tributaries.
