= Kharkiv Raion =

Subdivision of Kharkiv Oblast, Ukraine

Kharkiv Raion Харківський район (Ukrainian)
- Raion
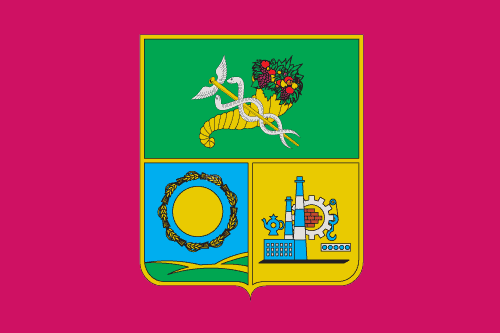
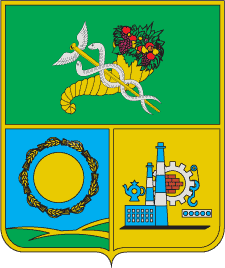
- Flag Coat of arms

- Raion location in Kharkiv Oblast, Ukraine
- Coordinates: 50°4′11.4666″N 36°16′46.959″E
- Country: Ukraine
- Oblast: Kharkiv
- Admin. center: Kharkiv
- Subdivisions: 15 hromadas

Area
  - Total: 3,222.5 km^{2} (1,244.2 sq mi)

Population (2022)
  - Total: 1,729,049
  - Density: 536.56/km^{2} (1,389.7/sq mi)
- Time zone: UTC+2 (EET)
  - Summer (DST): UTC+3 (EEST)
- Website: khrda.gov.ua

Kharkiv Raion (Ukrainian: Харківський район) is a raion (district) of Kharkiv Oblast in eastern Ukraine. Its administrative center is the city of Kharkiv. Population: 1,729,049 (2022 estimate).

On 18 July 2020, as part of the administrative reform of Ukraine, the number of raions of Kharkiv Oblast was reduced to seven, and the area of Kharkiv Raion was significantly expanded. One abolished raion, Derhachi Raion, as well as Liubotyn Municipality, part of Nova Vodolaha Raion, and the city of Kharkiv, which was previously incorporated as a city of oblast significance and did not belong to the raion, were merged into Kharkiv Raion. The January 2020 estimate of the population of the former Kharkiv Raion was 176,186 (2020 est.).

== Geography ==
The Kharkiv Raion is located in the north of the Kharkiv Oblast.

It covers an area of 3222.5 km².

In the north, the district borders with the Belgorodsky Raion of the Belgorod Oblast of Russia, in the east with the Chuhuiv Raion, in the south with the Berestyn Raion, and in the west with the Bohodukhiv Raion of the Kharkiv Oblast.

== History ==
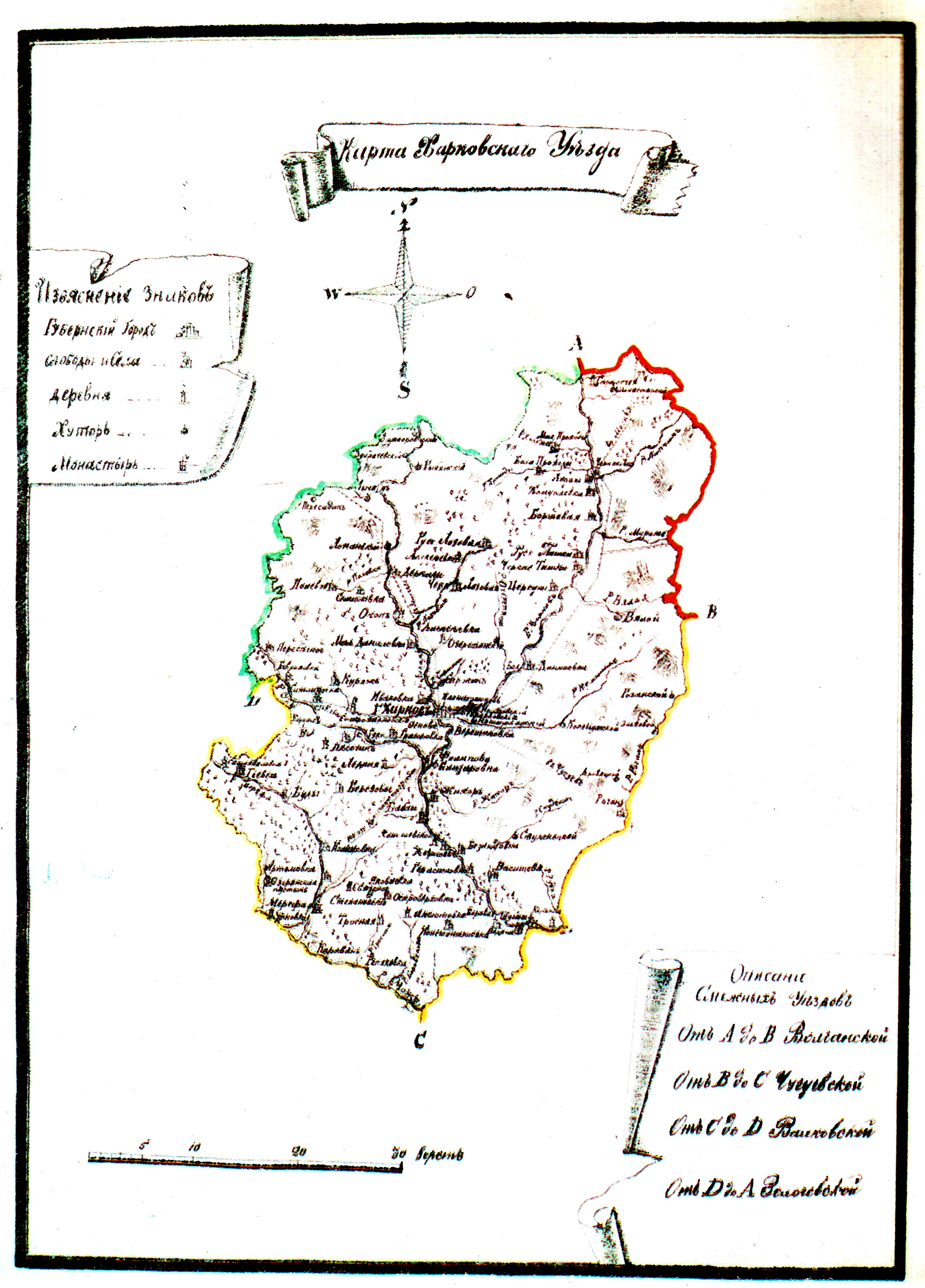
Kharkovsky Uezd in 1788

On March 7, 1923, the government of the Ukrainian SSR, by the resolution of the Presidium of the All-Ukrainian Central Executive Committee No. 315 of March 7, 1923, adopted a new system of administrative division of the territory of the republic. Uezd and volost were replaced by districts and okrugs. In the Kharkov province, instead of 10 counties, 5 districts were created, instead of 227 volosts - 77 districts, including Lyubotynsky, Kharkovsky, Lipetsky, Tsirkunovsky, Merefa and Korotichansky, located on the territory of the current Kharkov district within its borders until July 2020.

Over forty years, the district's territory underwent administrative-territorial changes five times. Thus, on February 19, 1939, 10 settlement and 9 village councils were transferred from the Kharkov district to the Dergachevsky district. After World War II, until the end of the 1950s, the district was called the Kharkov rural district.

Since the moment when the Kharkiv district was formed according to the Resolution of the Presidium of the Supreme Soviet of the Ukrainian Soviet Socialist Republic of January 4, 1965 with the administrative center in the city of Kharkiv, the district's borders did not change until 2012/20. The area of the district within the 2012-20 borders was 136,431 hectares (1,364 km²).

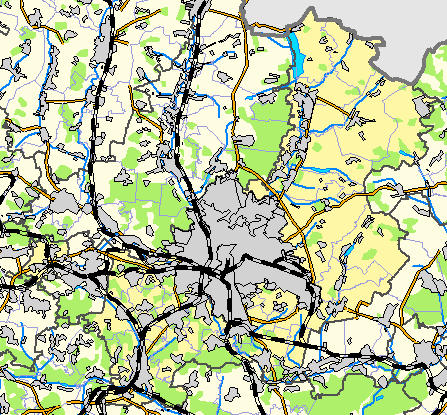
The raion in the old borders until July 2020

In 2020, as part of the "optimization" of districts in the Kharkiv Oblast, the Verkhovna Rada left seven districts, including Kharkiv. By the resolution of July 17, 2020, as part of the Ukrainian administrative-territorial reform on the new division of the Kharkiv Oblast, the district was enlarged, and it included the territories:

- former Kharkiv Raion;
- Derhachi Raion;
- northern part of Nova Vodolaha Raion;
- as well as the cities of regional significance Kharkiv and Liubotyn.

== Economy ==
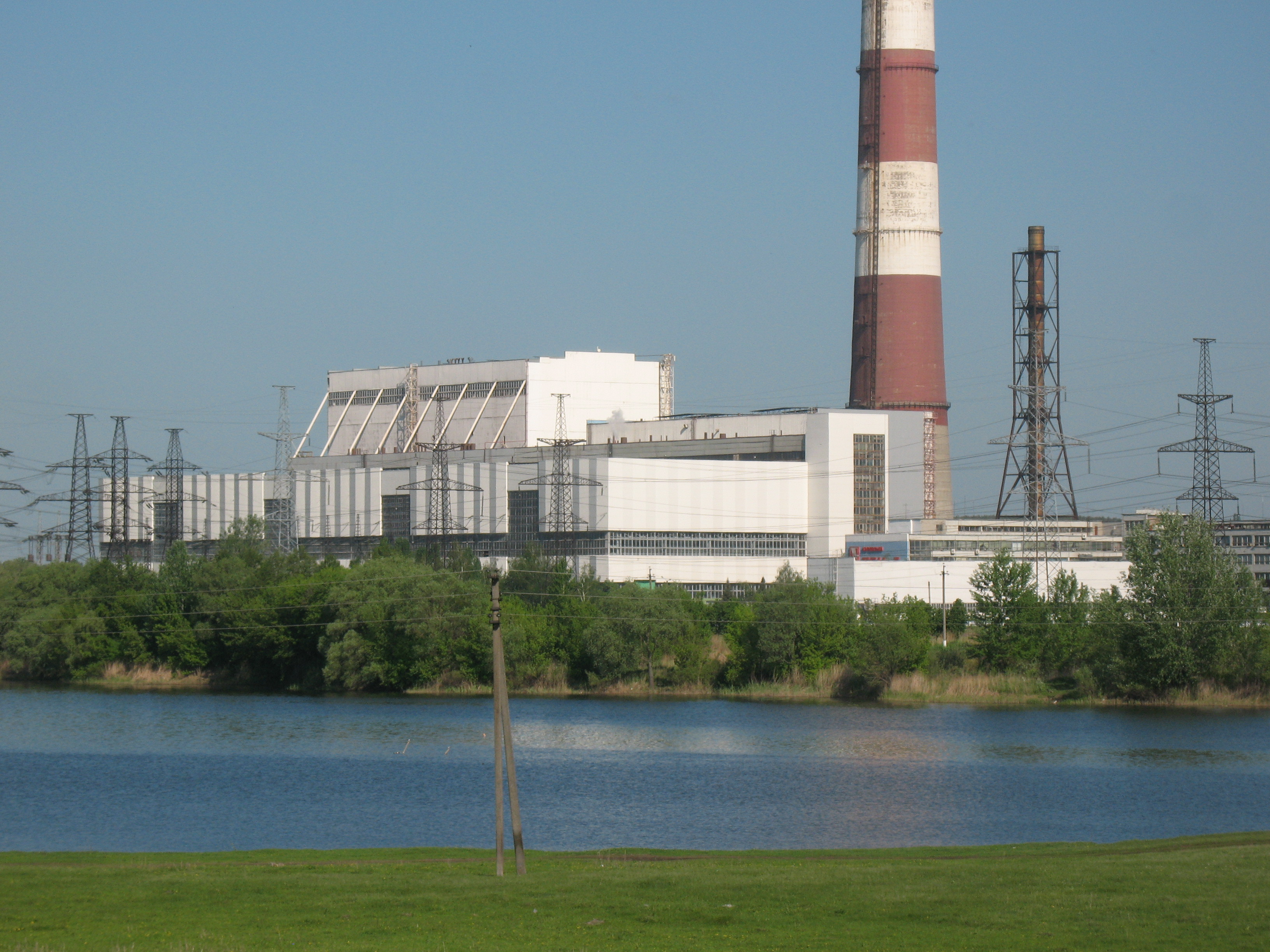
Kharkiv TEC-5

The district is part of the Kharkiv industrial hub and has a developed multi-branch industry, which is represented by industrial enterprises of machine-building, light, food, building materials and other industries.

JSC "Merefyansky Glass Plant" is known far beyond the region for its products. JSC "Kuryazky House-Building Plant", JSC "Nadiya" for the production of window blocks from polyvinyl chloride, JSC "Rohansk Cardboard Factory", JSC "Santekhbuddetal", JSC "Opora", Merefyansky Mechanical Plant, Artemivsk Distillery and others.

An important branch of the district's economy is agriculture. Agricultural lands occupy - 100.5 hectares, agricultural lands - 103771 hectares, arable land - 71187 hectares. In the agricultural sector of the Kharkiv district, there are 38 agricultural enterprises of various forms of ownership, as well as 183 farms (13 of them have land over 100 hectares) and a number of small subsidiary farms, as well as enterprises: "Agrotechservice", "Agroplemservice", "Silgosphimiya", workshops for the production of food products - oils, flour, cereals, sausages, etc.

== Transport ==
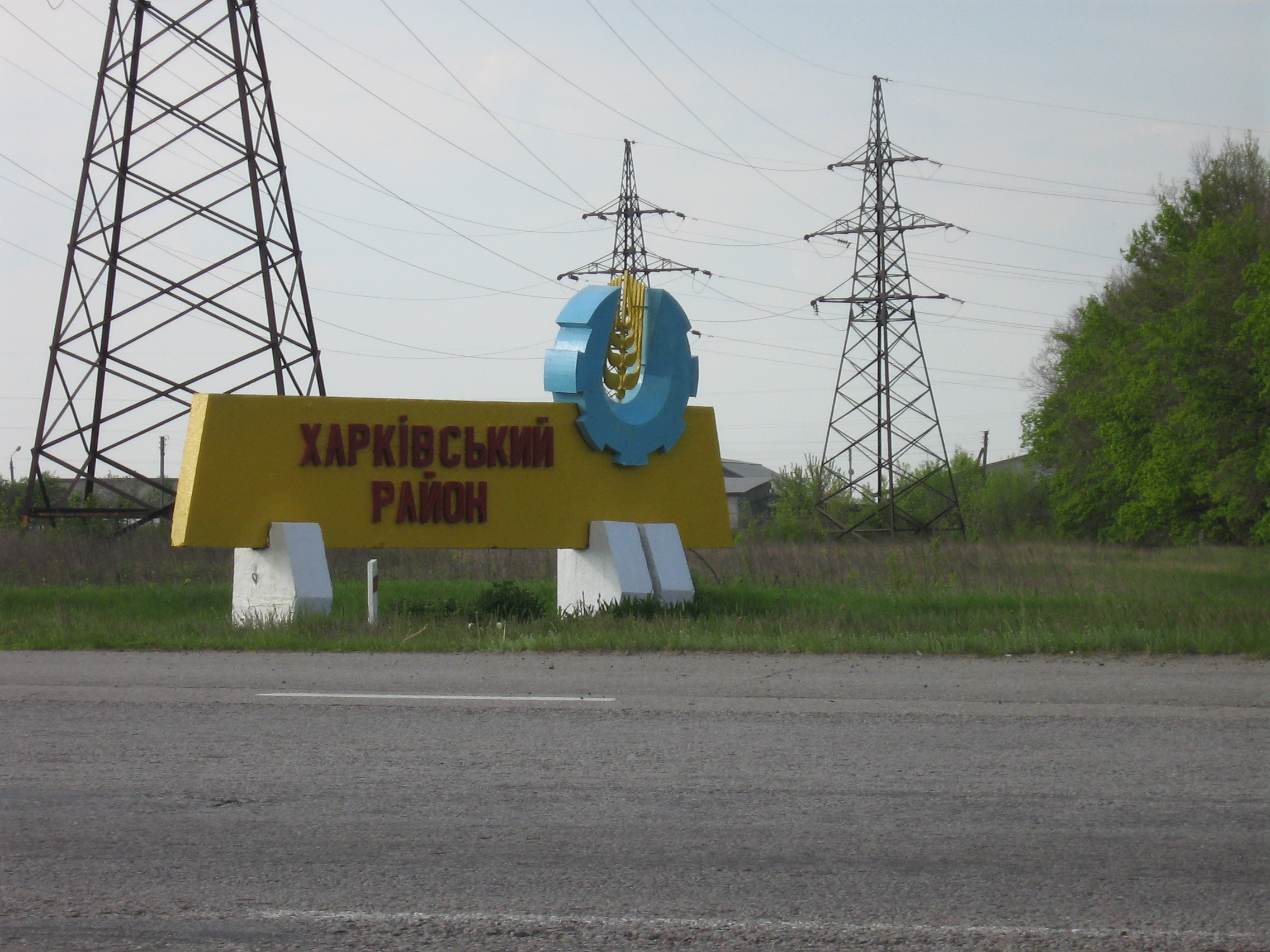
Stela of Kharkov raion

The territory of the district is saturated with railways, roads and pipelines. The total length of gas pipelines is 1451.53 km, 72256 households are gasified. The length of roads is 1372.9 km, including 598.2 km with hard surfaces. Such important highways as M-18 (E 105) Moscow - Simferopol, M-03 (E 40, E 50) Kyiv - Kharkov pass through the territory.

== Subdivisions ==
=== Current ===
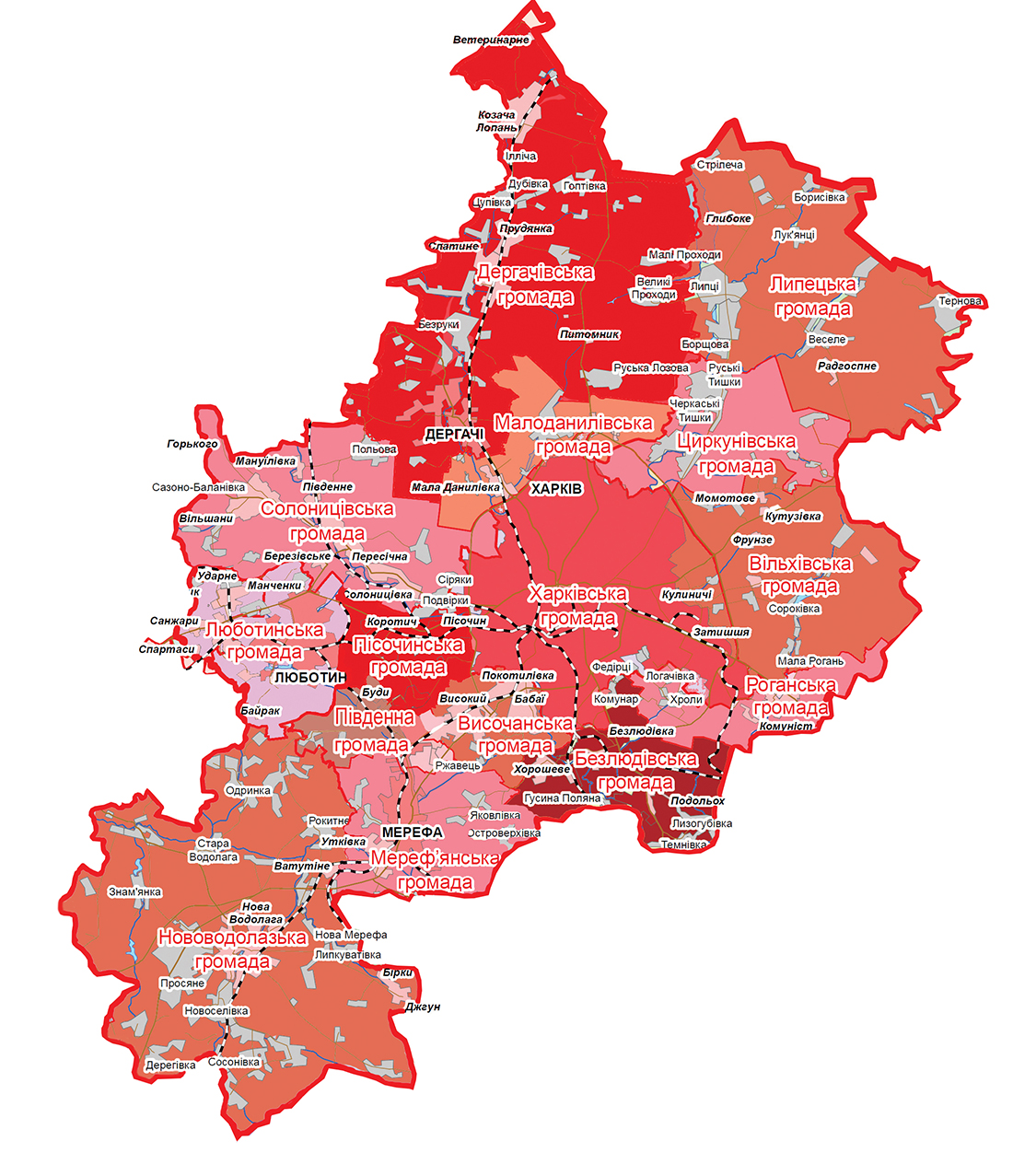
Map of the raion

After the reform in July 2020, the raion consisted of 15 hromadas:

- Bezliudivka settlement hromada with the administration in the rural settlement of Bezliudivka, retained from Kharkiv Raion;
- Derhachi urban hromada with the administration in the city of Derhachi, transferred from Derhachi Raion;
- Kharkiv urban hromada with the administration in the city of Kharkiv, transferred from the city of oblast significance of Kharkiv;
- Liubotyn urban hromada with the administration in the city of Liubotyn, transferred from Liubotyn Municipality;
- Lyptsi rural hromada with the administration in the village of Lyptsi, retained from Kharkiv Raion;
- Mala Danylivka settlement hromada with the administration in the rural settlement of Mala Danylivka, transferred from Derhachi Raion;
- Merefa urban hromada with the administration in the city of Merefa, retained from Kharkiv Raion;
- Nova Vodolaha settlement hromada with the administration in the rural settlement of Nova Vodolaha, transferred from Nova Vodolaha Raion;
- Pisochyn settlement hromada with the administration in the rural settlement of Pisochyn, retained from Kharkiv Raion;
- Pivdenne urban hromada with the administration in the city of Pivdenne, retained from Kharkiv Raion;
- Rohan settlement hromada with the administration in the rural settlement of Rohan, retained from Kharkiv Raion;
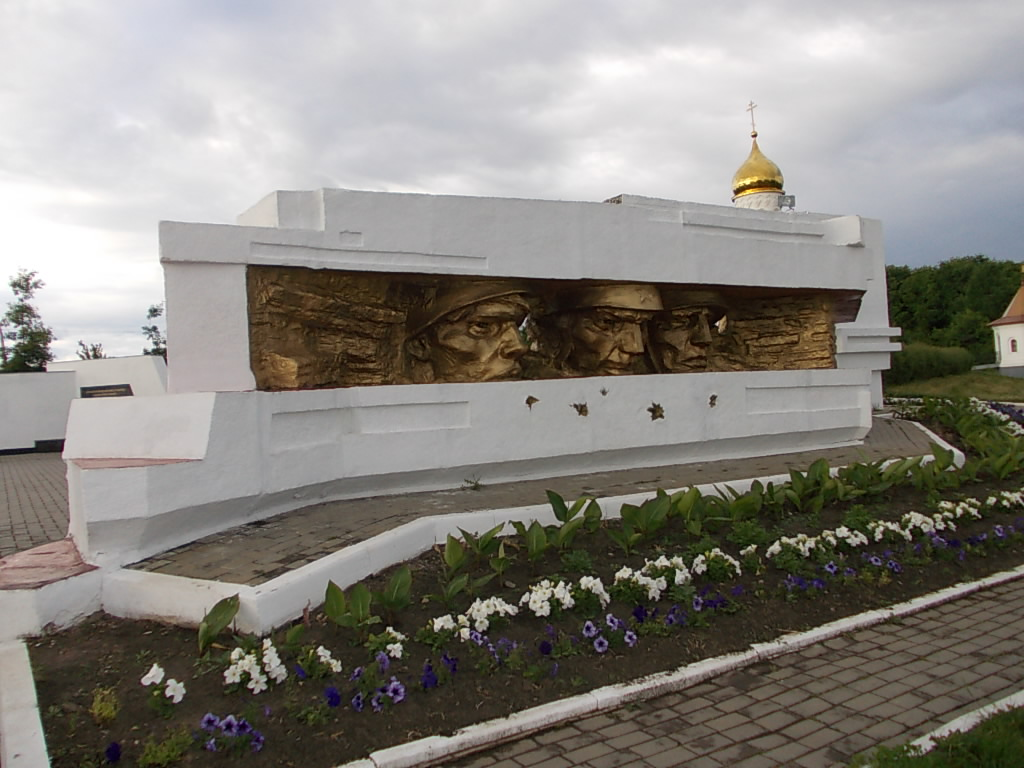
- Memorial complex "Height of Marshal I. S. Konev"
  Solonytsivka settlement hromada with the administration in the rural settlement of Solonytsivka, transferred from Derhachi Raion;
- Tsyrkuny rural hromada with the administration in the village of Tsyrkuny, retained from Kharkiv Raion;
- Vilkhivka rural hromada with the administration in the village of Vilkhivka, retained from Kharkiv Raion;
- Vysokyi settlement hromada with the administration in the rural settlement of Vysokyi, retained from Kharkiv Raion.

=== Before 2020 ===
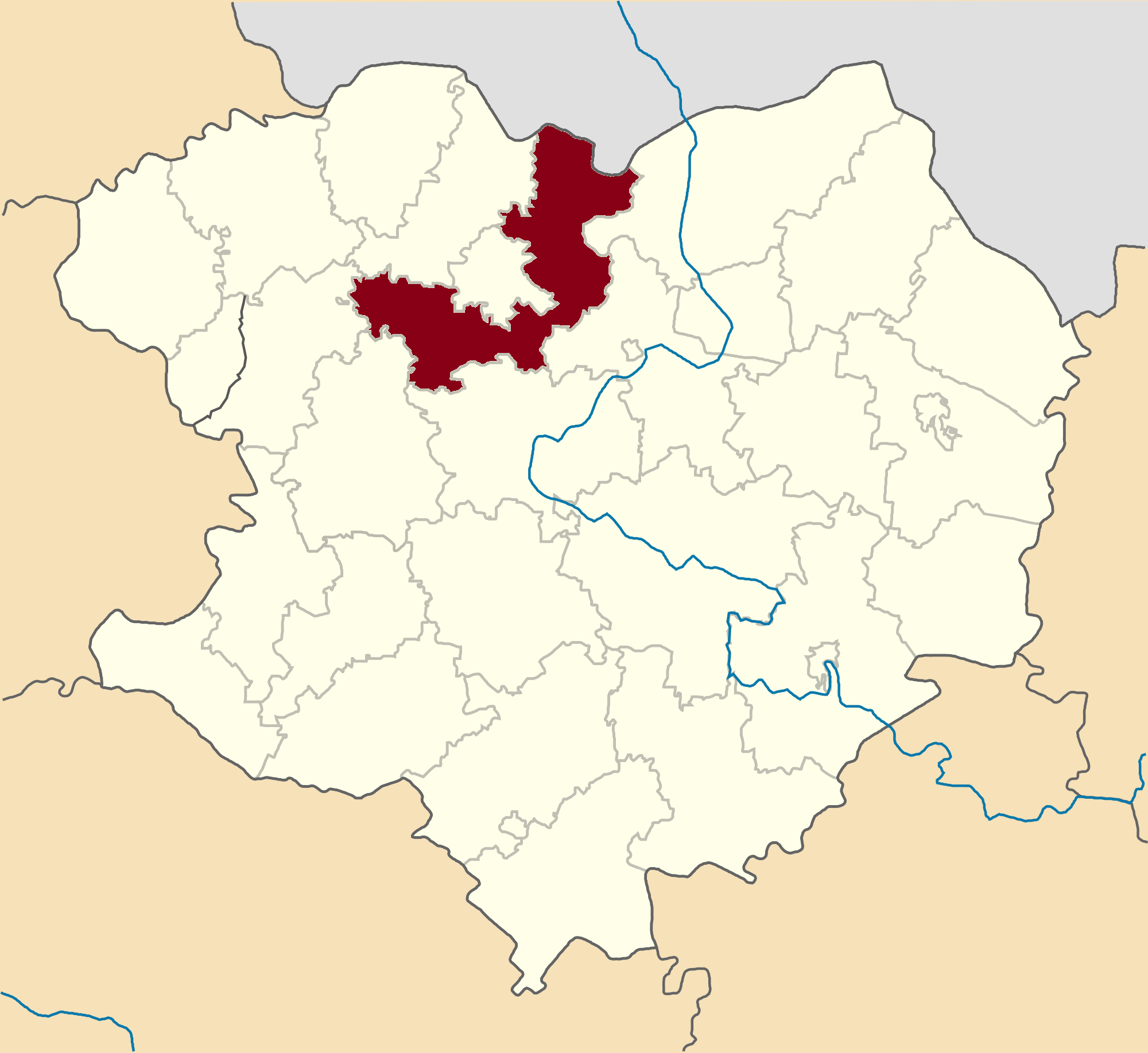
Kharkiv Raion in Kharkiv Oblast before 2020

Before the 2020 reform, the raion consisted of nine hromadas:

- Bezliudivka settlement hromada with the administration in Bezliudivka;
- Lyptsi rural hromada with the administration in Lyptsi;
- Merefa urban hromada with the administration in Merefa;
- Pisochyn settlement hromada with the administration in Pisochyn;
- Pivdenne urban hromada with the administration in Pivdenne;
- Rohan settlement hromada with the administration in Rohan;
- Tsyrkuny rural hromada with the administration in Tsyrkuny;
- Vilkhivka rural hromada with the administration in Vilkhivka;
- Vysokyi settlement hromada with the administration in Vysokyi.

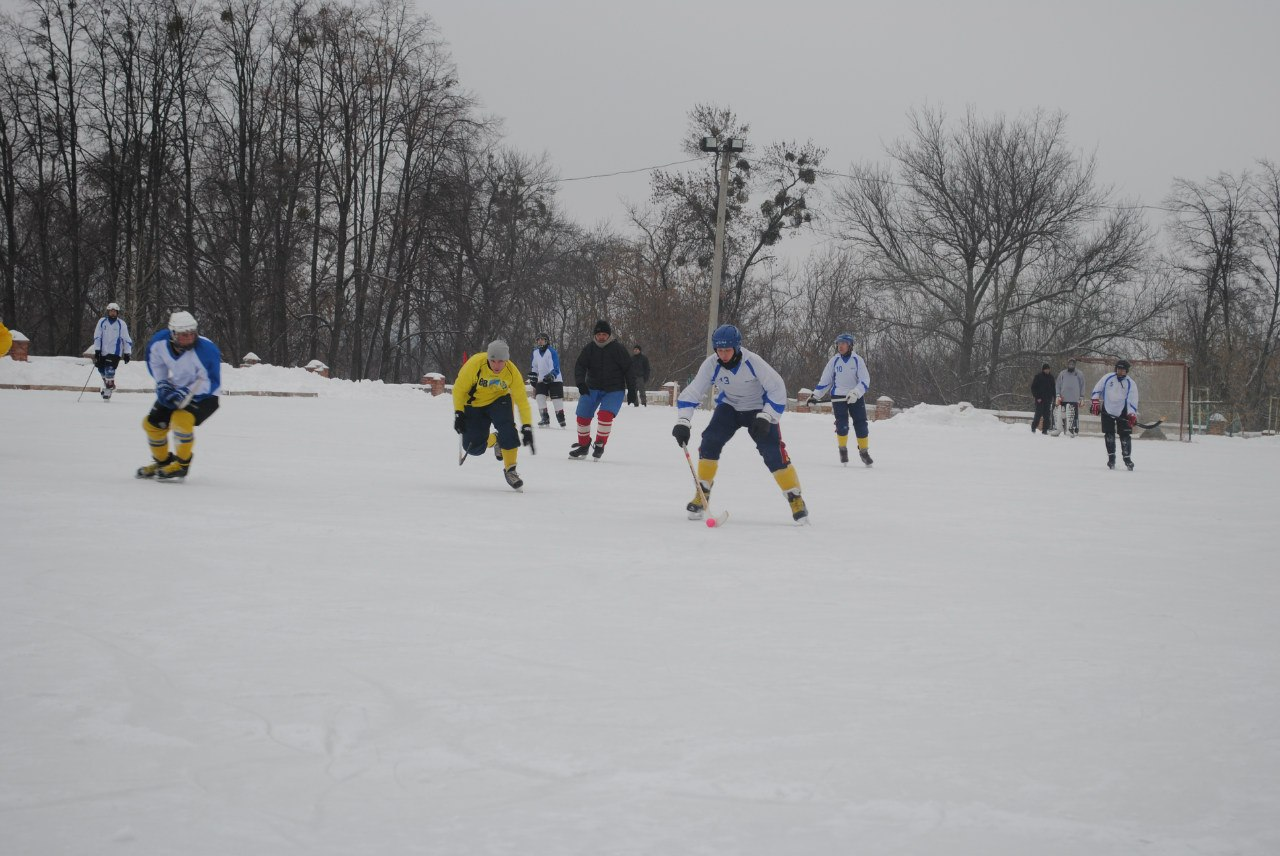
Playing bandy in Budy, Kharkiv Raion

== Notable residents ==
- Ivan Sirko (1605 – 1680), Ukrainian Cossack military leader
- Hryhorii Skovoroda (1722 – 1794), Ukrainian philosopher
- Dmytro Yavornytsky (1855 – 1940), Ukrainian academician
- Klavdiya Shulzhenko (1906 – 1984), Soviet popular female singer and actress
- Hnat Khotkevych (1877 – 1938), Ukrainian writer and bandurist
