= Russian occupation of Kharkiv Oblast =

Military occupation by Russia

- Military occupation
- Flag Coat of arms

- Territory never captured by Russian forces Previously Russian-held, now Ukrainian-held; Territory currently under Russian control
- Occupied country: Ukraine
- Occupying power: Russia
- Russian-installed occupation regime: Kharkov; military-civilian administration (Note: Russian: Харьковская военно-гражданская администрация) (May 2022–present)
- Russian invasion of Ukraine: 24 February 2022
- Ukrainian Kharkiv counteroffensive: 6 September 2022
- Kharkiv Oblast campaign: 10 May 2024
- Administrative centre: Kupiansk (until 8 September 2022); Vovchansk (8 – 11 September); Belgorod (since 11 September 2022)
- Largest settlement: Izium (until 10 September 2022); Vovchansk (10–11 September); Kivsharivka (11–28 September); Borova (28 September – 3 October); Tavilzhanka (3 October – 10 May 2024); Strilecha (10 May 2024 – 28 January 2025); Dvorichna (28 January 2025 — 1 December 2025); Vovchansk (1 December 2025 — present)

Government
  - Governor: Vitaly Ganchev
  - Prime Minister: Andrey Alekseyenko (in 2022)

The Russian occupation of Kharkiv Oblast is an ongoing military occupation that began on 24 February 2022, after Russian forces invaded Ukraine and began capturing and occupying parts of Kharkiv Oblast, Ukraine. Russian forces failed to capture the capital city of the oblast, Kharkiv. However, other major cities including Izium, Kupiansk, and Balakliia were captured by Russian forces. Since November 2022, Russia only occupies a small portion of land in the Kharkiv Oblast.

In early September 2022, Ukraine began a major counteroffensive, regaining several settlements in the region and ending numerous Russian military or military-civilian administrations.

== Background ==
The city of Vovchansk and the town of Velykyi Burluk came under Russian control on 24 February 2022, the first day of the Russian invasion. Shevchenkove came under Russian occupation on 26 February 2022. Russian forces entered Kupiansk on 27 February. Balakliia was taken by Russian forces on 2 March.

The city of Izium was captured by Russian forces on 1 April 2022.

== History ==
In May 2022, a pro-Russian military-civilian administration was created for the Russian-controlled parts of Kharkiv Oblast. Four military-civilian raion (district-level) administrations were also established for Kupiansk Raion, Izium Raion, Kharkiv Raion and Vovchansk Raion.

Vitaly Ganchev, a former lieutenant colonel in the Ukrainian police, was made the head of the oblast military-civilian administration the same month. On 19 August Andrey Alekseyenko was appointed first deputy head of the Kharkiv Oblast military-civilian administration and Prime Minister.

On 8 July 2022, Ganchev said that Kharkiv Oblast was an "inalienable" part of Russian territory and intended for Kharkiv Oblast to be annexed by the Russian Federation via referendum. But on 11 August, Ganchev told the Russia-24 TV channel that the authorities of the territories of the Kharkiv Oblast controlled by Russian troops are not yet ready to discuss a referendum on joining Russia, because "only 20 percent and no more" of the region is under Russian control. According to Ukrainian intelligence, before the Ukrainian counteroffensive, Russia planned to hold a referendum in Kharkiv Oblast in November, with a planned 75% vote in favour of joining Russia.

Ukraine began a counteroffensive in the Kharkiv Oblast in early September. By 10 September 2022, Ukraine recaptured Izium, ending the military-civilian administration and Russian occupation of the city. By 11 September, Russia had withdrawn from most of the settlements it previously occupied in the oblast, including Kupiansk, Vovchansk, Balakliia and Shevchenkove. The Russian Ministry of Defense also announced a formal withdrawal of Russian forces from all of Kharkiv Oblast west of the Oskil river stating that an "operation to curtail and transfer troops was underway."

The Kharkov Military-Civilian Administration, originally based in Kupiansk, briefly relocated to Vovchansk on 8 September 2022, but moved again before the city was recaptured by Ukrainian forces on 11 September 2022. By 18 September 2022, Russian forces only occupied a small strip of Kharkiv Oblast east of the Oskil. On 13 September 2022, Ukrainian forces had reportedly crossed the Oskil and had set up positions at multiple locations.

On 3 October 2022, Russian forces fled from Nyzhche Solone, Pidlyman, Nyzhnia Zhuravka, Borova, and Shyikivka, allowing Ukrainian authorities to regain control of almost all of the oblast.

=== After the 2022 Ukrainian counteroffensive ===
In a February 2023 interview, Ganchev said that the military-civilian administration was continuing its work, and that about twenty settlements in the Kharkiv Oblast were still under Russian control.

In a December 2024 interview, Ganchev said that there were about 2,000 civilians living in the Russian-controlled parts of Kharkiv Oblast, under frequent Ukrainian shelling and often without heat, electricity, and gas, due to the destruction of infrastructure over the course of the fighting. He said that a pro-Russian Kupiansk Raion military-civilian administration had continued its work even after the 2022 Kharkiv counteroffensive, and that at least 34 settlements in that area were under Russian control. Ganchev said that the administration provides the civilians there with social services and assistance in obtaining Russian citizenship, and that voting for the 2024 Russian presidential election was conducted in some settlements in the area.

By November 2024, in the northeastern part of the Kharkiv Oblast, Russian forces crossed the Oskil River. On 28 January 2025, Russian officials claimed to have retaken the town of Dvorichna, which had a pre-war population of over 3,000 inhabitants.

In March 2025, Ganchev said that while about 70 settlements in the Kharkiv Oblast were under Russian control, his administration still only exercised authority over 34 of them.

On 5 August 2025, Russia entered the northern part of Kupiansk.

== Human rights and humanitarian effect ==
According to The Guardian, inhabitants of occupied Izium had survived in their basements for three weeks without electricity, heating or running water. The report also claimed that Russian soldiers had prepared lists of individuals to "hunt": gun owners, wealthy people and others deemed "dangerous" such as businessmen, activists, military, and their families. The Russian army was also accused of barring passage of humanitarian convoys while food and medicine available in the city was running out.

Following the end of the Russian occupation on 10 September, multiple bodies were discovered in the town of Zaliznychne, reportedly killed by Russian troops during the early days of the war.

=== Izium mass graves ===
On 15 September 2022, several mass graves, including one site containing at least 440 bodies, were found in woods near the Ukrainian city of Izium after it was recaptured by Ukrainian forces during the Russian invasion of Ukraine. The graves contained bodies of people who were killed by Russian forces. The Ukrainian government believes that over 1,000 civilian residents were killed during the battle for and subsequent Russian occupation of Izium.

According to Ukrainian investigators, 447 bodies were discovered in one of the sites including 414 bodies of civilians (215 women, 194 men, 5 children) and 22 servicemen. Most of the dead showed signs of violent death and 30 presented traces of torture and summary execution, including ropes around their necks, bound hands, broken limbs and genital amputation; others might have died from shelling and a lack of access to healthcare.

On 26 September, Ukrainian President Volodymyr Zelenskyy said that two more mass graves had been found "with hundreds of people".

== Partisan and other resistance ==
On 3 April 2022, the Ukrainian government stated that two Russian soldiers were killed and 28 others hospitalized after Ukrainian civilians handed out poisoned cakes to Russian soldiers of the Russian 3rd Motor Rifle Division in Izium.

On 11 July 2022, the Russian-appointed military-civilian administration leader of Velykyi Burluk, Yevgeny Yunakov, was assassinated in a car bombing.

On 23 November 2023 the Russian-appointed deputy head of the occupation administration Oleksandr Slisarenko was killed when his car exploded in Belgorod, Russia. An anonymous source told Ukrainska Pravda that the Security Service of Ukraine was responsible for his killing.

== Control of settlements ==
Name	Pop.	Raion	Held by	As of	More information
Balakliia	26,921	Izium	Ukraine	8 Sep 2022	Captured by Russia on 3 March 2022. Recaptured by Ukraine on 8 September 2022.
Barvinkove	8,110	Izium	Ukraine	30 Apr 2022	
Berestove	230	Kupiansk	Russia	15 Nov 2024	Pressured by Russia between around 16–17 May 2024. Contested by Russia between around 18 May – 14 November 2024. Claimed by Russian sources between around 26–28 May 2024. Confirmed captured by Russia on 15 November 2024.
Bohodukhiv	15,797	Bohodukhiv	Ukraine	24 Feb 2022	
Bohuslavka	1330	Izium	Ukraine	5 Oct 2022	
Borivska Andriyivka	163	Izium	Ukraine	5 Oct 2022	
Borova	5,174	Izium	Ukraine	3 Oct 2022	Captured by Russia on 14 April 2022. Recaptured by Ukraine on 3 October 2022.
Borshchivka	3,139	Izium	Ukraine	9 Sep 2022	
Borysivka	533	Kharkiv	Russia	10 May 2024	Recaptured by Russia on 10 May 2024.
Buhaivka	1	Kharkiv	Ukraine	12 May 2024	
Buhruvatka	12	Chuhuiv	Russia	14 May 2024	Pressured and contested by Russia between 12 and 14 May 2024. Recaptured by Russia on 14 May 2024.
Cherkaski Tyshky	1,165	Kharkiv	Ukraine	10 May 2022	
Chkalovske	3,730	Chuhuiv	Ukraine	9 Sep 2022	Captured by Russia on 16 March 2022. Recaptured by Ukraine on 6 September 2022.
Chuhuiv	31,535	Chuhuiv	Ukraine	7 Mar 2022	See Chuhuiv air base attack Captured by Russia on 25 February 2022. Recaptured by Ukraine on 7 March 2022.
Derhachi	17,433	Kharkiv	Ukraine	6 Apr 2022	
Dovhenke	850	Izium	Ukraine	22 Aug 2022	See Sloviansk offensive
Dvorichna	3,387	Kupiansk	Russia	30 Nov 2024	Captured by Russia on 14 April 2022. Recaptured by Ukraine on 11 September 2022. Contested by Russia since around 30 November 2024. Claimed recaptured by Russian sources on 15 December 2024. Confirmed recaptured by Russia by 28 January 2025.
Dvorichne	326	Kupiansk	Russia	31 Dec 2023	Captured by Russia in February 2022. Recaptured by Ukraine 11 September 2022. Contested between 2022 and 2023. Recaptured by Russia on 10 February 2023.
Fyholivka	104	Kupiansk	Russia	6 Feb 2025	Recaptured by Russia on 6 February 2025.
Ivanivka	135	Kupiansk	Russia	9 Jun 2024	Pressured by Russia on 23 May 2024. Contested by Russia between around 24–25 May 2024. Recaptured by Russia between around 25 May – 6 June 2024.
Izium	45,884	Izium	Ukraine	10 Sep 2022	See Battle of Izium, Izium mass graves Captured by Russia on 27 March 2022. Recaptured by Ukraine by 10 September 2022.
Hatyshche	509	Chuhuiv	Russia	12 May 2024	Recaptured by Russia between around 10–11 May 2024.
Hlyboke	1,203	Kharkiv	Contested	18 Jun 2024	Recaptured by Russia between 11 and 13 May 2024. Pressured by Ukraine between around 7–16 June 2024. Contested by Ukraine since around 16 June 2024.
Holubivka	26	Kupiansk	Russia	25 Jul 2025	Contested by Russia before 25 July 2025. Captured by Russia on 25 July 2025.
Hoptivka	999	Kharkiv	Ukraine?	12 May 2024	
Horobivka	263	Kupiansk	Russia	31 Dec 2023	Captured by Russia in February 2022. Recaptured by Ukraine by 24 September 2022. Again recaptured by Russia by 18 October 2022.
Hrushivka	1,277	Kupiansk	Ukraine	8 Sep 2022	
Hrianykivka	607	Kupiansk	Russia	30 Dec 2023	
Husarivka	1,352	Izium	Ukraine	27 Mar 2022	Captured by Russia in 2022. Recaptured by Ukraine on 26/27 March 2022.
Izbytske	37	Chuhuiv	Ukraine	11 May 2024	
Kalynove	-	Kupiansk	Ukraine	31 Dec 2023	
Kamianka	961	Kupiansk	Ukraine	30 Dec 2023	
Kharkiv	1,433,886	Kharkiv	Ukraine	2 Mar 2022	See Battle of Kharkiv, Kharkiv cluster bombing, Dormitories missile strike
Khotimlia	1,351	Chuhuiv	Ukraine	29 Feb 2024	Captured by Russia on 24 February 2022. Recaptured by Ukraine on 10 September or 15 September 2022.
Kivsharivka	18,302	Kupiansk	Ukraine	28 Sep 2022	Сaptured by Russia in 2022. Recaptured by Ukraine on 28 September.
Kochetok	2,968	Chuhuiv	Ukraine	3 May 2022	
Kotliarivka	255	Kupiansk	Russia	5 May 2024	Pressured by Russia between around 28 January – 1 February 2024. Pressured and contested by Russia between 27 April – 4 May 2024. Recaptured by Russia on 4 May 2024.
Kozacha Lopan	5,005	Kharkiv	Ukraine	11 Sep 2022	Captured by Russia in February 2022. Recaptured by Ukraine 11 September 2022.
Krasne	20	Kharkiv	Russia	10 May 2024	Recaptured by Russia on 10 May 2024.
Krasne Pershe	84	Kupiansk	Ukraine	30 Dec 2023	
Krasnohrad	20,013	Krasnohrad	Ukraine	24 Feb 2022	
Krokhmalne	45	Kupiansk	Russia	20 Jan 2024	Recaptured by Russia on 20 January 2024.
Kruhliakivka	1,173	Kupiansk	Russia	31 Oct 2024	Contested by Russia between around 19–30 October 2024. Claimed captured by Russia on 30 October 2024. Confirmed captured by Russia on 31 October 2024.
Kudiivka	22	Kharkiv	Ukraine	12 May 2024	Claimed pressured by a Russian source since around 10–12 May 2024.
Kupiansk	27,169	Kupiansk	Ukraine	25 Jul 2025	Captured by Russia 27 February 2022. Recaptured by Ukraine by 10 September 2022. Contested by Russia between 14 and 24 November 2024. Contested by Russia from 25 July 2025 until November 2025. Confirmed liberated by Ukraine in November 2025.
Kupiansk-Vuzlovyi	8,397	Kupiansk	Ukraine	26 Sep 2022	Captured by Russia in 2022. Recaptured by Ukraine on 26 September 2022.
Kutuzivka	1,184	Kharkiv	Ukraine	28 Apr 2022	
Kyslivka	965	Kupiansk	Russia	6 May 2024	Contested by Russia between around 26 April and 6 May 2024. Recaptured by Russia around 6 May 2024.
Lebyazhe	1,534	Chuhuiv	Ukraine	20 Apr 2022	
Liubotyn	20,376	Kharkiv	Ukraine	24 Feb 2022	
Lozova	54,026	Lozova	Ukraine	24 Feb 2022	
Lozova	64	Izium	Russia	26 Dec 2024	Captured by Russia around 24 December 2024.
Lukiantsi	1,242	Kharkiv	Russia	15 May 2024	Pressured by Russia around 11 May 2024. Contested by Russia around 12 May 2024. Recaptured by Russia on 13 May 2024.
Lyman Pershyi	280	Kupiansk	Russia	19 Dec 2023	Captured by Russia in February 2022. Recaptured by Ukraine by 1 October 2022. Again recaptured by Russia on 16 February 2023.
Lyptsi	4,182	Kharkiv	Ukraine	25 May 2024	Captured by Russia in 2022. Recaptured by Ukraine 11 September 2022. Pressured by Russia between around 16–25 May 2024.
Malynivka	7,500	Chuhuiv	Ukraine	5 Apr 2022	Captured by Russia in early 2022. Recaptured by Ukraine on 5 April 2022.
Merefa	21,421	Kharkiv	Ukraine	24 Feb 2022	
Milove	508	Kupiansk	Contested	12 Jul 2025	Contested by Russia since 12 July 2025.
Molodova	595	Chuhuiv	Ukraine	3 May 2022	
Morokhovets	44	Kharkiv	Russia	11 May 2024	Recaptured by Russia on 11 May 2024.
Novomlynsk	16	Kupiansk	Russia	31 Jan 2025	Captured by Russia on 24 February 2022. Recaptured by Ukraine on 10 September 2022. Claimed by Russian sources on 4 June 2023. Recaptured by Russian forces in early January 2025.
Ohirtseve	234	Chuhuiv	Russia	11 May 2024	Recaptured by Russia around 10 May 2024.
Oliinykove	8	Kharkiv	Russia	11 May 2024	Recaptured by Russia on 11 May 2024.
Oskil	3,217	Izium	Ukraine	7 Sep 2022	Captured by Donetsk PR on 5 May 2022. Recaptured by Ukraine on 7 September 2022.
Pechenihy	5,058	Chuhuiv	Ukraine	3 May 2022	
Pervomaiskyi	28,986	Lozova	Ukraine	24 Feb 2022	
Petropavlivka	2,452	Kupiansk	Contested	13 Sep 2024	Contested by Russia since around 12 September 2024.
Pishchane	528	Kupiansk	Russia	20 Jul 2024	Claimed pressured by a Russian source between 16 June – 5 July 2024. Contested by Russia between 6 – 19 July 2024. Captured by Russia on 20 July 2024.
Pisky-Radkivski	2,507	Izium	Ukraine	26 Sep 2022	Captured by Russia on 2 March 2022. Recaptured by Ukraine on 26 September 2022.
Pivdenne	7,394	Kharkiv	Ukraine	24 Feb 2022	
Pletenivka	124	Chuhuiv	Russia	11 May 2024	Recaptured by Russia around 10 May 2024.
Protopopivka	1,253	Izium	Ukraine	4 May 2022	
Prylipka	12	Chuhuiv	Ukraine	21 May 2024	Pressured by Russia since around 21 May 2024.
Pylna	220	Kharkiv	Russia	10 May 2024	Recaptured by Russia on 10 May 2024.
Radkivka	39	Kupiansk	Ukraine	12 Dec 2025	Contested by Russia before 23 July 2025. Captured by Russia on 23 July 2025. Recaptured by Ukraine 12 December 2025.
Rubizhne	649	Chuhuiv	Ukraine	11 Sep 2022	Recaptured by Russia 19 May 2022. Ukrainian control claimed by Ukrainian sources as of 17 June 2022. Russian forces in control as of 23 August. Recaptured by Ukraine 11 September 2022.
Ruska Lozova	5,016	Kharkiv	Ukraine	6 May 2022	
Ruski Tyshky	1,908	Kharkiv	Ukraine	10 May 2022	
Savyntsi	5,266	Izium	Ukraine	8 Sep 2022	Captured by Russia in 2022. Recaptured by Ukraine on 8 September 2022.
Shevchenkove	6,724	Kupiansk	Ukraine	8 Sep 2022	Captured by Russia 26 February 2022. Recaptured by Ukraine on 7 September 2022.
Slatyne	6,076	Kharkiv	Ukraine	9 Apr 2022	
Sotnytskyi Kozachok	177	Bohodukhiv	Contested	4 Jul 2024	Raided by Russia on 26 June 2024. Raided by Russia and claimed captured on 4 July 2024.
Staryi Saltiv	3,394	Chuhuiv	Ukraine	2 May 2022	Captured by Russia in 2022. Recaptured by Ukraine on 2 May 2022.
Starytsia	486	Chuhuiv	Contested	19 Jun 2024	Pressured by Russia between 11 and 14 May 2024. Contested by Russia since 14 May 2024. Claimed by Russian sources between 15 and 18 May 2024.
Strilecha	2,097	Kharkiv	Russia	10 May 2024	Captured by Russia on 24 February 2022. Recaptured by Ukraine on 13 September 2022. Recaptured by Russia on 10 May 2024.
Stroivka	31	Kupiansk	Russia	29 May 2025	Contested by Russia since 27 May 2025. Captured by Russia on 29 May 2025.
Studenok	1,440	Izium	Ukraine	18 Sep 2022	Captured by Russia in March 2022. Multiple reports said Russian forces withdrew 15 September 2022.
Synkivka	389	Kupiansk	Russia	7 Sep 2024	Captured by Russia in 2022. Recaptured by Ukraine in the Kharkiv counteroffensive. Contested by Russia between around 28 November 2023 – 5 September 2024. Captured by Russia on 6 September 2024.
Tabaivka	34	Kupiansk	Russia	28 Feb 2024	Recaptured by Russia on 27 January 2024.
Tavilzhanka	1,924	Kupiansk	Russia	22 Nov 2022	Captured by Russia.
Ternova	907	Kharkiv	Ukraine	13 May 2024	
Tymkivka†	N/A	Kupiansk	Ukraine	11 Jun 2024	Claimed by Russian sources on 11 June 2024.
Tokarivka	16	Kharkiv	Ukraine	12 May 2024	
Topoli (rural settlement)	261	Kupiansk	Russia	23 Mar 2025	Captured by Russia in February 2022. Recaptured by Ukraine on about 11 September 2022. Demined by 7 September 2023. Recaptured by Russia on 23 March 2025.
Topoli (village)	860	Kupiansk	Russia	8 Mar 2022	Captured by Russia on 25 February 2022.
Tsyrkuny	6,310	Kharkiv	Ukraine	7 May 2022	
Tykhe	163	Chuhuiv	Contested	19 Jun 2024	Recaptured by Russia around 11 May 2024. Recaptured by Ukraine around 18 June 2024. Contested by Russia since around 12 January 2025.
Udy	1,677	Bohodukhiv	Ukraine	11 Sep 2022	Russia advanced in the settlement on 28 August. Recaptured by Ukraine on 11 September 2022.
Valky	8,721	Bohodukhiv	Ukraine	24 Feb 2022	
Velykyi Burluk	3,656	Kupiansk	Ukraine	11 Sep 2022	Captured by Russia on 24 February 2022. Recaptured by Ukraine on 10 September 2022.
Verbivka	3,515	Izium	Ukraine	7 Sep 2022	
Vilshana	1,500	Kupiansk	Russia	1 Mar 2022	Captured by Russia on 1 March 2022.
Vovchansk	17,747	Chuhuiv	Contested	12 May 2024	See also: Northern Kharkiv front of the Russo-Ukrainian war Captured by Russia on 24 February 2022. Recaptured by Ukraine on 11 September 2022. Pressured by Russia on 11 May 2024. Contested by Russia since 12 May 2024.
Vovchanski Khutory	1,340	Chuhuiv	Ukraine	18 May 2024	Claimed shared control by Russian sources since around 17 May 2024.
Yakovenkove	1,123	Izium	Ukraine	8 Sep 2022	Recaptured by Ukraine on 7 September 2022.
Zapadne	345	Kupiansk	Russia	6 Feb 2025	Claimed recaptured by Russia on 22 January 2025. Confirmed recaptured by Russia on 5 February 2025.
Zmiiv	14,071	Chuhuiv	Ukraine	24 Feb 2022	
Zolochiv	7,926	Bohodukhiv	Ukraine	10 Apr 2022	
Zybyne	115	Chuhuiv	Ukraine	18 May 2024	Claimed pressured and contested by Russian sources between 12 and 18 May 2024. Claimed by Russian sources on 17 May 2024.

== See also ==
- Russian invasion of Ukraine
- Russo-Ukrainian War
- Outline of the Russo-Ukrainian war
- Russian-occupied territories of Ukraine (former occupation marked in italics)
  - Russian occupation of Crimea
  - Russian occupation of Chernihiv Oblast
  - Russian occupation of Donetsk Oblast
  - Russian occupation of Dnipropetrovsk Oblast
  - Russian occupation of Kherson Oblast
  - Russian occupation of Kyiv Oblast
  - Russian occupation of Luhansk Oblast
  - Russian occupation of Mykolaiv Oblast
  - Russian occupation of Sumy Oblast
  - Russian occupation of Zaporizhzhia Oblast
  - Russian occupation of Zhytomyr Oblast
  - Snake Island campaign
- Annexation of Crimea by the Russian Federation
- Collaboration with Russia during the Russian invasion of Ukraine
- Russian annexation of Donetsk, Kherson, Luhansk and Zaporizhzhia oblasts
