= 429th Unmanned Systems Brigade (Ukraine) =

429th Unmanned Systems Brigade "ACHILLES"
- 429-та окрема бригада безпілотних систем «АХІЛЛЕС»
- Insignia
- Active: 2022 – present
- Country: Ukraine
- Branch: Territorial Defence Forces (2022-2023); Ukrainian Ground Forces (2022-2025); Unmanned Systems Forces
- Type: Unmanned Systems
- Role: Aerial Reconnaissance, FPV drone strikes, Ground Drone Warfare, Cargo Transport
- Size: Brigade
- Part of: 112th Territorial Defense Brigade (2022-2023); 92nd Assault Brigade (2023-2025)
- Garrison/HQ: Kharkiv
- Nickname: Achilles
- Patron: Achilles
- Engagements: Russo-Ukrainian war; 2022 Russian invasion of Ukraine; Northern Ukraine campaign; Battle of Kyiv; Battle of Brovary; Eastern Ukraine campaign; Battle of Kharkiv; 2022 Kharkiv counteroffensive; Battle of Kupiansk; Battle of Donbas; Battle of Chasiv Yar; Battle of Bakhmut; Battle of Soledar; 2024 Kharkiv offensive
- Website: https://achilles.army/

Commanders
- Current commander: Major Yuriy Fedorenko

Insignia
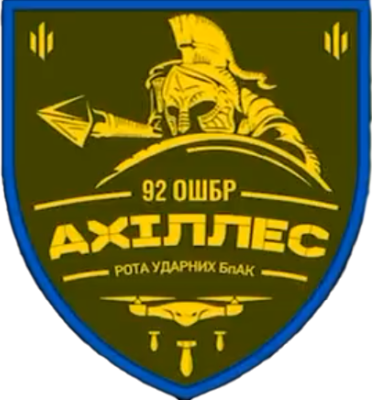
- Former Insignia

The 429th Unmanned Systems Brigade "Achilles" is a brigade-level UAV unit of the Unmanned Systems Forces of Ukraine.

It was established in 2022, by volunteers who joined the Territorial Defense Forces on the first day of the Russian invasion of Ukraine, as the fourth company of the 128th Battalion of the 112th Territorial Defense Brigade. It was later transferred to Ground Forces, as part of the 92nd Assault Brigade and expanded to a Battalion in January 2024.

Following the creation of the Unmanned Systems Forces command in 2024, it was moved from the brigade-level drone forces to the new centralized grouping. In January 2025, it was expanded to a regiment and, in January 2026, to a brigade.

== History ==
112th Territorial Brigade

The unit was established by volunteers from the fourth company of the 128th Battalion of the 112th Territorial Defense Brigade, most of whom were civilians without any proper training. From 24 February 24 to 3 March 2022, the 4th Company of the 128th Battalion defended the Kyiv Chaika Airfield, after which it was deployed to Brovary before the start of the Battle of Brovary. On 11 April 2022, Yuriy Serhiyovych Fedorenko became the commander of the Fourth Company. In May 2022, the unit took part in the Battle of Kharkiv holding positions near Bazaliivka. Also in May, an aerial reconnaissance detachment was established by the Company utilizing UAVs and the fourth company began working alongside the artillery of the 92nd Mechanized Brigade as an aerial reconnaissance unit. On 28 May 2022, the Company conducted first joint operation with the artillerymen of the 92nd Brigade, destroying several pieces of Russian equipment, and inflicted casualties on Russian personnel, following which the cooperation with the brigade became permanent.

92nd Mechanized Brigade

From June to August 2022, the unit "covered" Balakliya, Korobochkyne, Pushkarne, Lebyazhe, Bazaliivka and Pechenihy with reconnaissance UAVs. In August 2022, the 128th Battalion was to leave the positions and rotate but the company was split between leaving and not leaving the positions. Under these conditions, a general meeting called the "Cossack Council" was held and it was ultimately decided that the Company will continue its operations on the frontlines and not leave the positions. In September 2022, during the 2022 Kharkiv counteroffensive, a group of UAVs from the Company struck Russian positions in Vovchy Yar and Stepove allowing penetration by ground forces which were able to reach Ivanivka. Also in September, the unit conducted stabilization operations in Ivanivka, Shevchenkove and Mykolaivka, intercepting several Russian artillery reconnaissance personnel. A part of the unit operated alongside the 14th Mechanized Brigade, conducting offensive operations in Velykyi Burluk and Vovchansk. A group from the unit under the personal command of Yuriy Fedorenko took up defensive positions in the Forest near Hrushivka and Kupiansk, directing artillery strikes on Russian positions for seven hours. Following the capture of Kupiansk, a drone workshop was established at the Company's base, soon followed by another. During the capture of Kupiansk, the unit rescued a shell-shocked shepherd dog named Jack, who was later adopted by the family of Italian singer Andrea Bocelli.

In January 2023, the company fought in the Svatove sector, captured Novoselivske and took up positions for counteroffensive purposes.

On 26 January 2023, the company officially became one of the first strike UAV companies in Ukraine.

In February 2023, it was officially transferred to the 92nd Assault Brigade. From March to May 2023, it fought the Wagner Group near Khromove during the Battle of Bakhmut and on 9 May 2023, the battalion with assistance from reconnaissance forces of the 92nd Brigade captured a Russian soldier using a drone. From May to July 2023, it participated in the Battle of Soledar, repelling Russian assaults. From July 2023, it saw combat in Klishchiivka and Andriivka. In November 2023, a group of analysts commissioned by the Central Directorate of Unmanned Systems assessed the capabilities of 16 out of 93 strike UAV companies and the Company was ranked amongst the top three. According to the battalion's social media, in 2023, the "Achilles" hit 2,332 targets including 264 pieces of equipment and 884 structures.

Expansion to Battalion

In January 2024, the Company started a recruitment campaign and on 31 January 2024, the company was expanded to the "Achilles" Strike UAV Battalion. In spring 2024, the Achilles Battalion regularly repelled Russian assaults on Andriivka, Chasiv Yar and Ivanivske. On 5 April 2024, the battalion set its record of destroying 10 pieces of Russian equipment in a day, including five BMD-2s, four BMP-2s and one buggy with the fighter "Darwin" scoring most hits. In May 2024, the Achilles Battalion was transferred from Donetsk Oblast to the Kharkiv Oblast to partake in repelling the 2024 Kharkiv offensive. In May–June 2024, the Achilles UAV battalion claimed to have inflicted "heavy losses" on Russian forces in the Belgorod Oblast across the international border hitting 92 targets including 11+ anti-tank guns, howitzers and other artillery systems, two tanks and 20 armored vehicles. On 18 July 2024, one of its crews hit and significantly damaged the 2S43 Malva self-propelled howitzer in the Liptsy-Hlybokye sector, in Kharkiv Oblast, marking the first hit on Malva by an FPV drone in history. In the first eight months of 2024, the Achilles Battalion claimed to have hit 4,957 targets and delivered 547 cargo packages. On 25 September 2024, near Kupiansk, the battalion destroyed a Russian 2S5 Giatsint-S long-range 152mm artillery system. On 26 September 2024, the Achilles Battalion broke its previous record while repelling a Russian Mechanized assault in Pishchanye near Kupiansk where about 50 units of Russian armored vehicles were advancing towards Kolisnykivka and Kruglyakivka. The Achilles Battalion destroyed 14 pieces of equipment including five infantry fighting vehicles, three tanks, one armored personnel carrier, one MTLB, two Urals, one Loaf and one ATV and damaged further 26 pieces of equipment, including 10 tanks, 10 infantry fighting vehicles, two BREMs, three MTLBs and one Ural. In total, in September 2024, the Achilles Battalion claimed to have hit 1,475 targets and delivered 247 cargo packages. On 11 December 2024, the Achilles battalion, together with the 1st Presidential Brigade and the 77th Airmobile Brigade, repelled a Russian Mechanized assault in Kupiansk with the Achilles Battalion alone destroying seven pieces of equipment including a tank, three infantry fighting vehicles and three MT-LBs as well as damaging eight more armored vehicles. On 18 December 2024, the Russians tried to expand the bridgehead near Oskil River by attempting a mechanized assault by advancing two columns of equipment from two directions. The Achilles Battalion, together with the 1st Presidential Brigade and the 77th Airmobile Brigade, halted the assault. In total, 11 pieces of equipment were destroyed including two tanks and nine infantry fighting vehicles and ten more were damaged including one MT-LB, one armored personnel carrier and eight infantry fighting vehicles. On 20 December 2024, Russians attacked the outskirts of Kupiansk with five vehicles. The Achilles Battalion together with the 1st Presidential Brigade, 114th Territorial Defense Brigade and the 116th Territorial Defense Brigade pushed them back. The UAV crews of the "Achilles" battalion destroyed three infantry fighting vehicles and one tank, another infantry fighting vehicle was damaged.

On 3–4 January 2025, the Achilles strike UAV Battalion together with the 1st Presidential Brigade and the 77th Airmobile Brigade, repelled two Russian assaults near Zagryzove with the UAV crews of the Achilles Battalion stopping 20 pieces of Russian equipment for two days, a rare GMZ-3 minelayer was amongst the equipment destroyed by the Battalion.

Expansion to Regiment

On 29 January 2025, the Achilles Battalion was expanded into the 429th Achilles UAV Regiment, with the commander of Achilles claiming that the expansion was a result of excellent performance such as the destruction of 19,853 targets in three years. On 15 March 2025, the regiment released information and videos showcasing the destruction of four Russian Pantsir-S1 air defence systems, worth 56 Million USD by its strike wing UAVs. On 1 April 2025, the regiment destroyed a rare Russian T-90M along with a UAZ Bukhanka in Kharkiv Oblast, another T-90M was damaged as well. In April 2025, the regiment hit a total of 1,967 targets. Yurii Felipenko, the Ukrainian theatre and film actor who joined the battalion in April 2024, was killed in combat on 14 June 2025. On 20 July 2025, the regiment struck and destroyed a North Koreas Type 75 multiple rocket launcher.

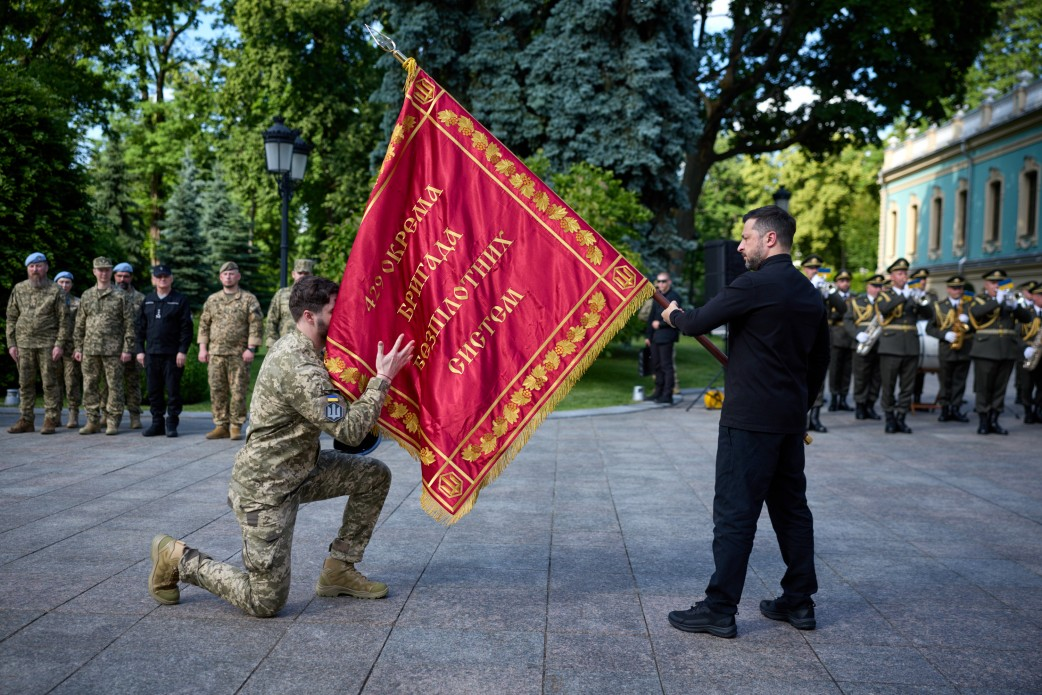
The 429th Unmanned Systems Brigade receives its battle flag by President Zelenskyy on a ceremony marking its expansion to a Brigade and inclusion into the USF

Expansion to Brigade

The Achilles unit continues to be an active contributor to the work of the Unmanned Systems Forces command and this was recognized, on the 10th January 2026, by further expansion, to brigade strength.

== Equipment ==
Model	Image	Origin	Type	Number	Notes
Vehicles
Humvee		United States	Infantry mobility vehicle		
Roshel Senator		Canada	Infantry mobility vehicle		

== Commanders ==
- 2022: Maj. Yuriy Serhiyovych Fedorenko.

== Structure ==
- Brigade Headquarters & Headquarters unit
- 1st Unmanned Systems Battalion
- 2nd Unmanned Systems Battalion
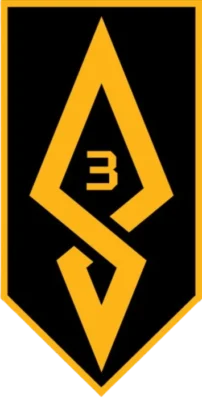
- 3rd Unmanned Systems Battalion
- Commandant Platoon
