= Kluhyno-Bashkyrivka =

Village in Kharkiv Oblast, Ukraine

Kluhyno-Bashkyrivka Клугино-Башкирівка
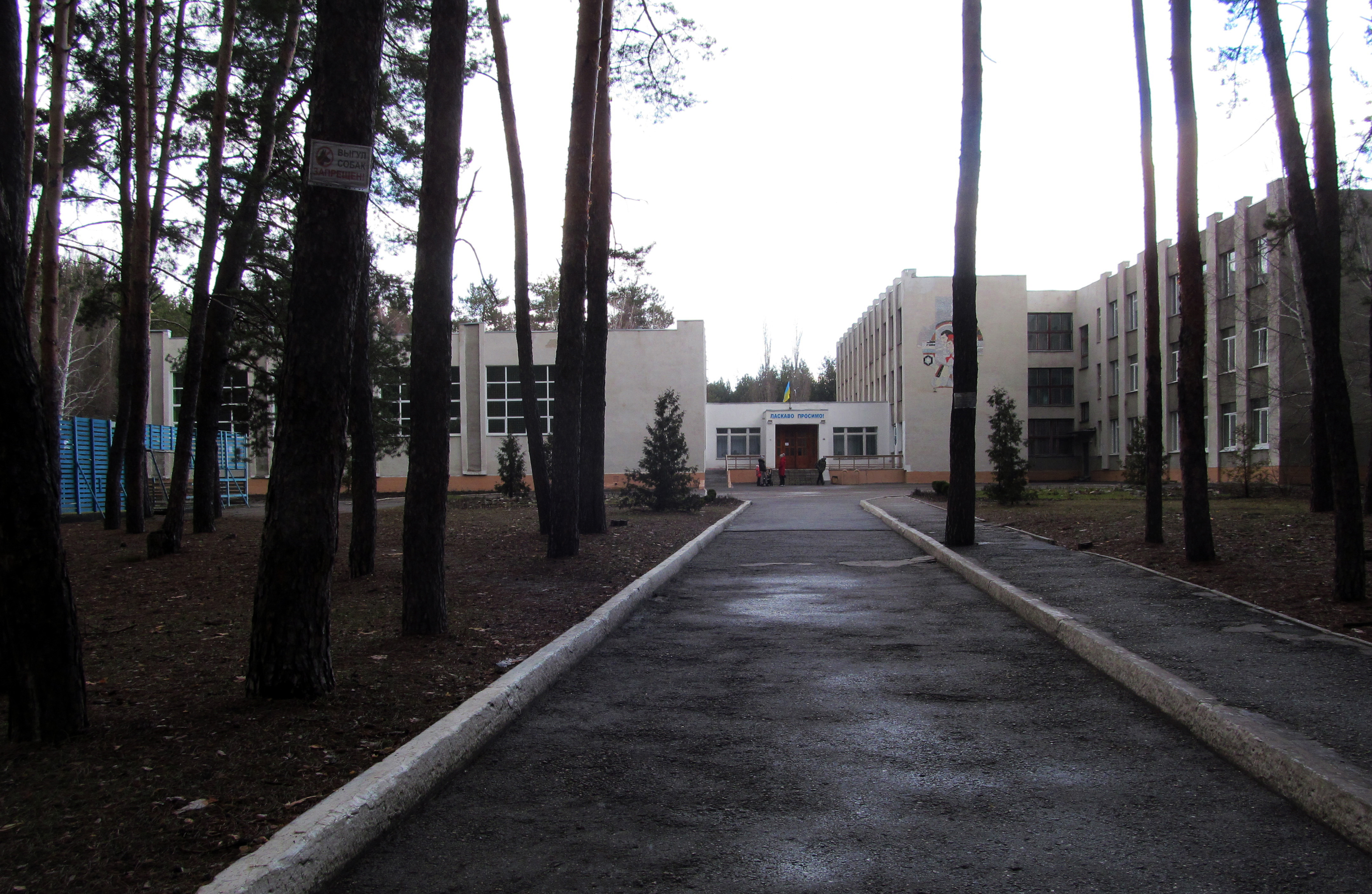

- Location of Kluhyno-Bashkyrivka Kluhyno-Bashkyrivka (Ukraine)
- Coordinates: 49°50′16″N 36°43′38″E
- Country: Ukraine
- Oblast: Kharkiv Oblast
- Raion: Chuhuiv Raion
- Established: 1693
- Elevation: 96 m (315 ft)

Population (2001)
  - Total: 738
- Postal code: 63530
- Climate: Cfa

Kluhyno-Bashkyrivka (Ukrainian: Клугино-Башкирівка) is a village in Chuhuiv Raion, Kharkiv Oblast (province) of eastern Ukraine.

The 92nd Mechanized Brigade is located in this village.
