= Travianske Reservoir =

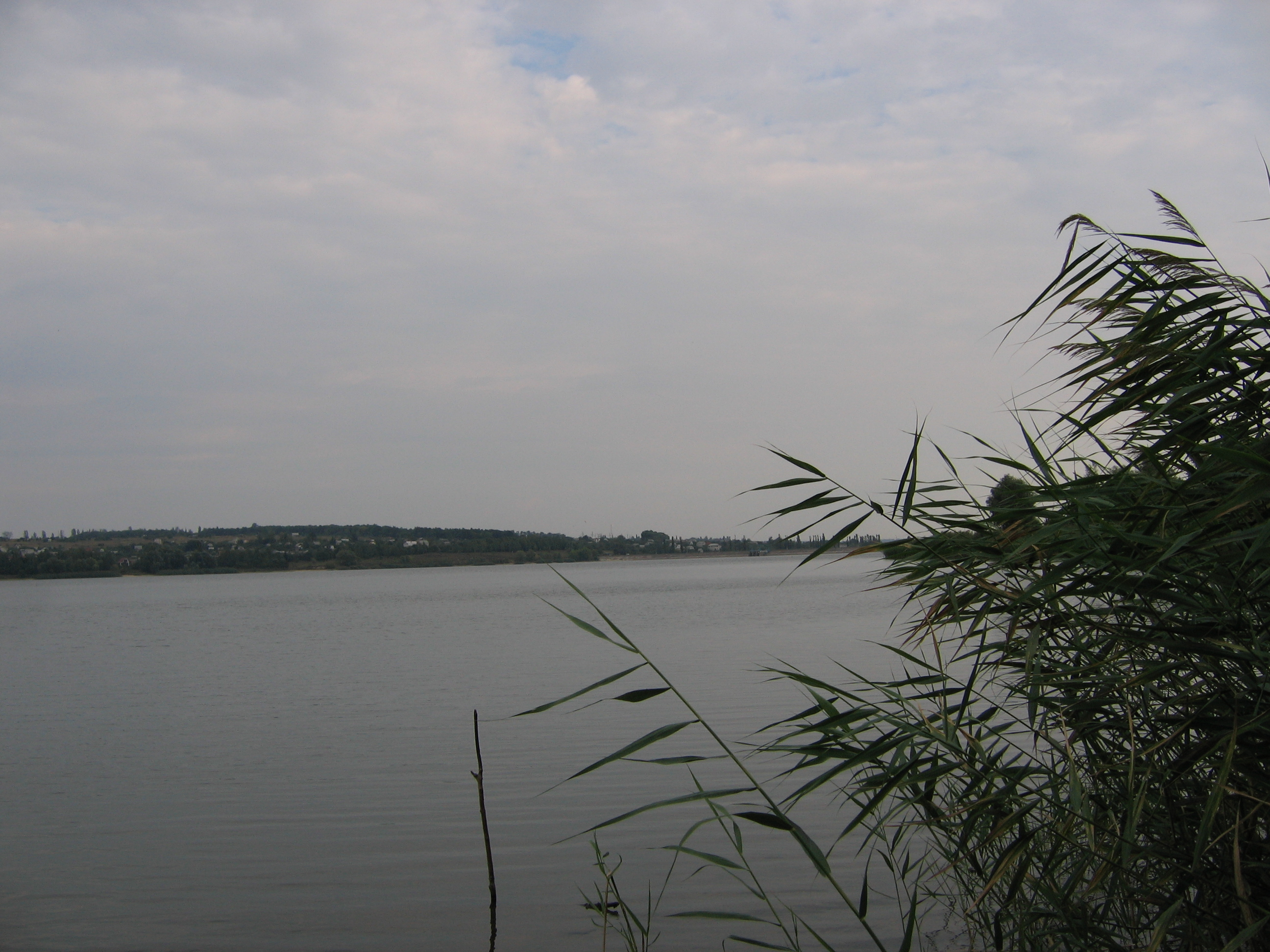
- Panoramic view of the reservoir

- Location within Kharkiv Oblast
- Interactive map of Travianske Reservoir
- Location: Kharkiv Oblast
- Coordinates: 50°16′00″N 36°22′00″E
- Type: Reservoir
- Primary inflows: Kharkiv River
- Primary outflows: Kharkiv River
- Basin countries: Ukraine
- Max. length: 6.5 km (4.0 mi)
- Max. width: 1.1 km (0.68 mi)
- Surface area: 5.92 km^{2} (2.29 sq mi)
- Average depth: 3.75 m (12.3 ft)
- Water volume: 22.2 km^{3} (5.3 cu mi)

The Travianske Reservoir (Ukrainian: Трав'янське водосховище) is a reservoir in eastern Ukraine along the Kharkiv River, and is about 6.5 kilometres (4.0 mi) long.

== History ==
The reservoir was first built in 1972, to provide freshwater to the nearby city of Kharkiv.

In 2024, during the Kharkiv offensive of the Russo-Ukrainian war, there were fighting reported in some areas around the reservoir. On July 8, a local resident in the nearby village of Lyptsi was wounded as a result of a drone explosion.

== Flora and Fauna ==
Some species that can be spotted in the reservoir include: mute swan, mallard, great crested grebe, Eurasian collared-dove, and common cuckoo.
