= Vovchanski Khutory =

Village in Kharkiv Oblast

Vovchanski Khutory Вовчанські Хутори
- Village
- Interactive map of Vovchanski Khutory
- Location of Vovchanski Khutory within Ukraine Vovchanski Khutory (Ukraine)
- Coordinates: 50.301111°N 37.032778°E
- Country: Ukraine
- Oblast: Kharkiv Oblast
- Raion: Chuhuiv Raion
- Hromada: Vovchansk urban hromada
- Founded: 1600

Area
  - Total: 4.494 km^{2} (1.735 sq mi)
- Elevation: 116 m (381 ft)

Population (2001 census)
  - Total: 1,340
  - Density: 298/km^{2} (772/sq mi)
- Time zone: UTC+2 (EET)
  - Summer (DST): UTC+3 (EEST)
- Postal code: 62508
- Area code: +380 5741
- KATOTTH: UA63140010190055761

Vovchanski Khutory (Ukrainian: Вовчанські Хутори; Russian: Волчанские Хутора) is a village (selo) in Chuhuiv Raion (district) in Kharkiv Oblast of eastern Ukraine, located 61.45 kilometres (38.18 mi) northeast by east (NEbE) of the centre of Kharkiv city, 5.13 kilometres (3.19 mi) southwards of the Russia–Ukraine border. It belongs to Vovchansk urban hromada, one of the hromadas of Ukraine.

== Geography ==
The village of Vovchanski Khutory is located mainly on the left bank of the Vovcha river, there is a bridge. Upstream is the village of Pokaliane, downstream is the town of Vovchansk, and on the opposite bank is the village of Tykhe.

== History ==
The settlement was founded in 1600.

=== Russian invasion of Ukraine 2022 ===
The village came under attack by Russian forces during the Russian invasion of Ukraine in May 2024.

As of May 15, 2025, the village has been completely destroyed by Russian army shelling. By 15 April 2026, Russian forces fully controlled the village.

== Demographics ==
As of the 2001 Ukrainian census, the settlement had 1,340 inhabitants, whose native languages were 93.49% Ukrainian, 6.43% Russian and 0.07% Polish.
