= 92nd Assault Brigade =

Ukrainian Ground Forces unit

92nd Separate Assault Brigade
- 92-га окрема штурмова бригада
- Brigade insignia
- Active: December 1, 1999 – present
- Country: Ukraine
- Branch: Ukrainian Ground Forces
- Role: Assault Infantry
- Part of: Operational Command East; 16th Army Corps
- Garrison/HQ: Kluhyno-Bashkyrivka, Kharkiv Oblast
- Patron: Ivan Sirko
- Engagements: Iraq War; Russo-Ukrainian War; Battle of Ilovaisk; Invasion of Ukraine; Battle of Kharkiv; 2022 Ukrainian Kharkiv counteroffensive; Battle of Bakhmut
- Decorations: (removed); Order of the Red Banner (removed) For Courage and Bravery
- Battle honours: Ropsha (removed)

Commanders
- Current commander: Col. Volodymyr Korobka
- Notable commanders: Col. Pavlo Fedosenko (May 2020 – June 2024)

Insignia
- Field insignia

- Older insignia

The 92nd Assault Brigade "Ivan Sirko" (Ukrainian: 92-га окрема штурмова бригада, romanized: 92 okrema shturmova bryhada), abbreviated 92 OShBr (Ukrainian: 92 ОШБр), is a formation of the Ukrainian Ground Forces. Its honorific name is after Cossack military leader Ivan Sirko. The unit was formed in 1999 as the 6th Mechanized Division based on the 6th Division of the National Guard of Ukraine. In 2000 it was reorganized as the 92nd Mechanized Brigade. Following the Russo-Ukrainian war and the 2015 decommunization in Ukraine, the brigade's Soviet honors and heritage were purged.

In August 2023, 92nd Mechanized Brigade was reformed to 92nd Assault Brigade.

== 48th Rifle Division (1920–1992) ==
=== Names ===
2nd Tula Rifle Division
48th Rifle Division
118th Motor Rifle Division
48th Motor Rifle Division

=== Early history ===
The division traces its heritage to the Soviet 48th Rifle Division that was established on 26 February 1920 by renaming the 2nd Tula Rifle Division. It became a territorial division after the Soviet-Polish War and was then upgraded to 'cadre' status. On 2 December 1930 it was given the title 'in the name of M.I. Kalinin.' In August–September 1939, two of its rifle regiments were expanded to become the 123rd Rifle Division and the 138th Rifle Division. In 1940 the division participated in the occupation of the Baltic states. On June 22, 1941, it was assigned to the 10th Rifle Corps of the 8th Army. It was based at Raseiniai in Lithuania, part of the second echelon, but soon after Operation Barbarossa began it was severely battered by the 6th Panzer Division. In September 1941 it incorporated the remnants of the 118th Rifle Division. In October it became part of the Coastal Operations Group of the Leningrad Front, defending the Oranienbaum Bridgehead pocket, just west of Leningrad on the coast of the Gulf of Finland. Then fought as part of the 2nd Shock Army and 42nd Army. On 19 January 1944 it was given the title 'Ropshinskaya.'

After the war, the division became the 69th Mechanized Division. In 1957 the 69th became the 118th Motor Rifle Division at Bolhrad. In 1964 it became the 48th Motor Rifle Ropshinska Order of the October Revolution and Order of the Red Banner awards division named after Mikhail Kalinin. From October 1968, it was based at Vysoké Mýto with the Central Group of Forces. It remain in Czechoslovakia until 1990 when it was the first Division to depart (between February and May 1990). It appears that there wasn't enough space for the entire division, so the 210th Motor Rifle Regiment was attached to the 18th Guards Motor Rifle Division. The remainder of the division departed for Ukraine, with the last units arriving by May 1991.

=== Relocation ===
1996 Jane's Intelligence Review information indicated the division had been moved to Smolensk in the Moscow Military District where it was later disbanded. Later information indicates that it was actually withdrawn to Kluhino-Bashkyrivka (Kluhyno-Bashkyrivka), Kharkiv Oblast (Chuhuiv) in Ukraine using the same garrison as the disbanded 75th Guards Tank Division. By then, it had been decided that in order to avoid the restrictions of the Conventional Forces in Europe Treaty, certain elements of the Soviet Army would be transferred to other non-MOD armed forces. Whole units were transferred to the KGB. When the last of the 48th arrived in Chuhuiv, the entire division was transferred to the Directorate of Instruction for Special Purposes KGB by June 1991. Regiments included the 265th Guards., 1335th MRR, 353rd Separate Training Battalion, 31st Separate Reconnaissance Battalion, 813th Separate Communications Battalion, 88th Separate Repair and Refurbishment Battalion, 409th Separate Material Supply Battalion, 34th Separate Medical Battalion, 99th Separate Engineering-Sapper Company, 348th Separate Chemical Defense Company. To replace the loss of the 210th MRR, the 255th Guards MRR was formed for the division, probably from what was left of the 75th GTD.

== National Guard service ==
From 12 January 1992 the government of Ukraine took command of the division, and they later redesignated it the 6th Division (NGU) of the National Guard of Ukraine. Most formations of the division were dissolved in 1999, except for the reconnaissance company based in Chuhuiv.

== 92nd Mechanized Brigade ==
In 1999, the 92nd Mechanized Brigade was established on the basis of the 6th Division of the National Guard of Ukraine. Even though most of units of the original Soviet division were relocated to Russia following dissolution of the Soviet Union, the new brigade was given all the honors of the Soviet 48th Rifle Division including its honorary name with Ukrainian adaptation, Ropshynska.

=== Missions to Iraq ===
During October 2003, the 61st Separate Mechanized Battalion was formed. The battalion was in Iraq from February to September 2004 as a unit of the 6th Mechanized Brigade (Ukraine). 104 soldiers from the brigade have taken part in UN peacekeeping missions to Lebanon, Liberia, Sierra Leone and Former Yugoslavia. Between 2007 and 2011, the brigade was commanded by Colonel Serhiy Guschenko. In 2011, Colonel Volodymyr Kozak became the brigade commander.

=== War in Donbas ===
The brigade fought in the war in Donbas.

In August 2014 the brigade's units were involved in an attempt to relieve encircled forces near Ilovaisk. A company tactical group was formed which had 276 soldiers, four tanks, three SPGs and more than ten IFVs. It was sent from Chuhuiv towards Ilovaisk on 24 August 2014, after it became clear that Russian military forces were approaching Ilovaisk. The unit was supposed to join up with an assault detachment from the Rukh Oporu Battalion and try to breach the Russian encirclement. The 92nd Brigade's company arrived at the city of Komsomolske on 27 August and advanced towards Ilovaisk. The column stopped in the field for a night and shortly after it was hit by heavy artillery shelling. The next morning it was defeated by Russian paratroopers, losing most vehicles but suffering relatively low personnel casualties: eight killed and several missing.

On 18 September 2014, the brigade received a number of refurbished T-64BV tanks. On 5 April 2015, four soldiers of the brigade were killed when their vehicle was blown up while crossing a bridge in Shchastia. Among those killed was brigade deputy chief of staff Major Oleh Kovbasa. The brigade was stationed in Shchastia as of June 2015.

On 16 May 2015, troops of 92nd Mechanized Brigade captured two Russian soldiers of the 3rd Guards Spetsnaz Brigade during a fight near Shchastia. One Ukrainian soldier was killed in the fight.

On 18 November 2015 the brigade's honorifics "Ropsha Order of the October Revolution Red Banner" were removed as part of an Armed Forces-wide removal of Soviet awards and honorifics.

Colonel Pavlo Fedosenko has commanded the brigade since 6 May 2020 and was awarded the Hero of Ukraine.

=== Russian invasion of Ukraine ===
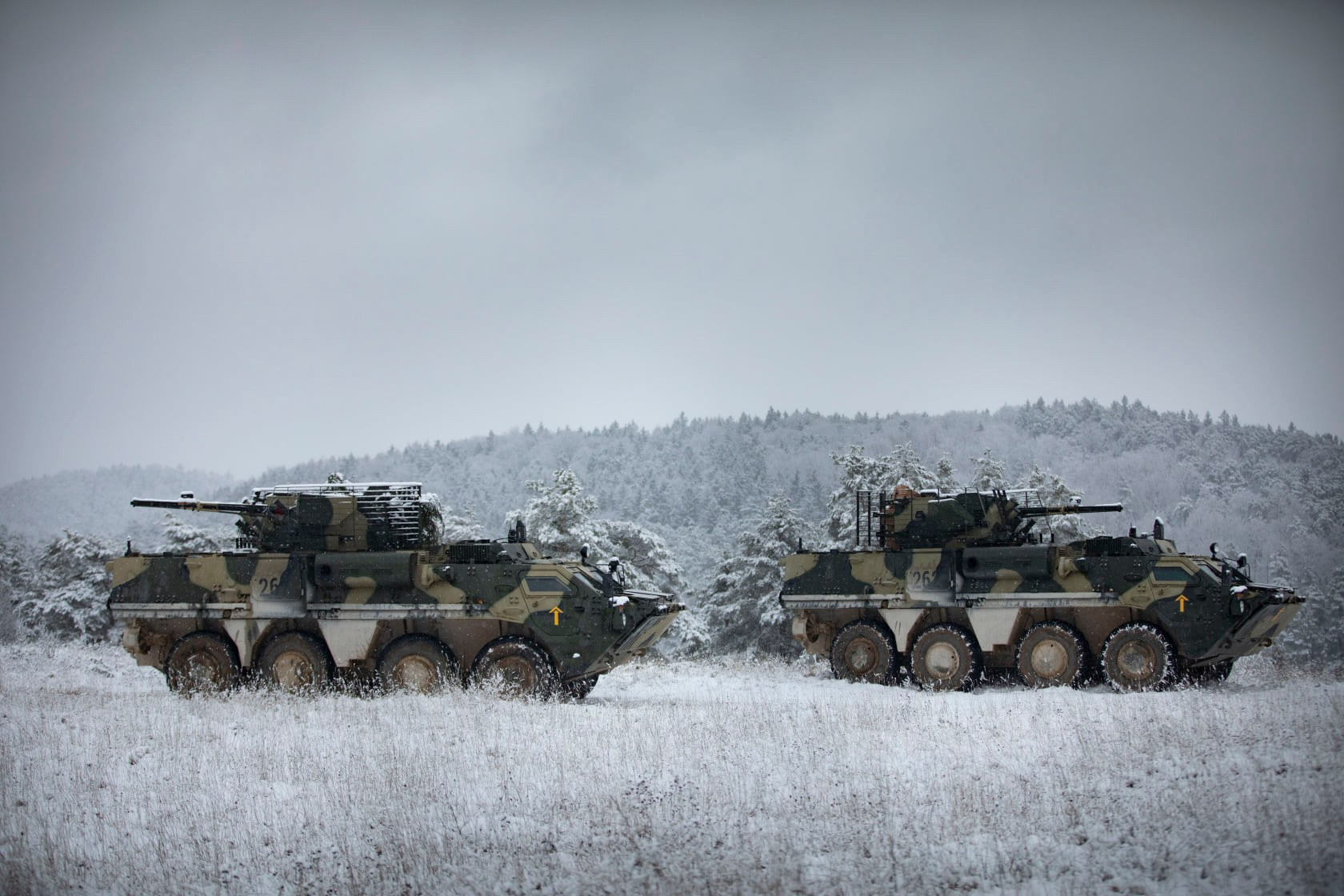
BTR-4s of the 92nd Mechanized Brigade

Before the Russian invasion of Ukraine, the brigade had been scheduled to be deployed to the Donbas on 25 February.

For the first three days of the Russian invasion of Ukraine, the brigade's area of responsibility spanned from the Kharkiv Oblast-Sumy Oblast border in the west to the Kharkiv Oblast-Luhansk Oblast border in the east. By the end of February, the brigade was redeployed to defensive positions along the Kharkiv Ring Road. Units of the 92nd Brigade defended the city of Derhachi near Kharkiv from Russian assaults from the first day of the invasion. The brigade was responsible for recapturing the village of Molodova in May 2022.

In September 2022, the brigade participated in the Kharkiv counteroffensive from Andriivka towards Kupiansk, capturing the city on September 10. Members of the brigade's 1st Mechanized Battalion were seen holding a Ukrainian battle flag with the Kupiansk City Council building in the background.

By 30 December 2022, the brigade along with the Kraken Regiment after months of fighting, retook the village of Novoselivske 18 km northwest of Svatove in the Luhansk Oblast with numerous Russian captives.

In February 2023, a video filmed by infantryman Ruslan Zubarev (callsign "Predator") went viral after being posted on his personal Telegram channel. A squad of Russian soldiers in a BMP-2 attempted to storm a trench held by the 92nd Brigade, close to Svatove. In the video, Zubarev uses multiple weapons, including a rocket launcher, to engage the Russian soldiers and their vehicle, which is shooting at Zubarev with its 30 mm autocannon. Another Ukrainian soldier, who was concussed and had never been in a trench before, is seen handing Zubarev hand grenades, magazines and weapons throughout the video. After the BMP-2 had been destroyed and multiple soldiers had been killed, the Russians retreated. Zubarev was subsequently awarded the Golden Cross by Valerii Zaluzhnyi for his actions.

The brigade was reflagged as an assault infantry formation in 2023.

In December 2024, it was reported that the brigade was involved in combat on the front line in the Kharkiv Oblast.

In January 2025, it was reported that the 92nd Brigade's 1st Assault Battalion was operating in Russia's Kursk Oblast, as part of the Ukrainian military operation there. The 1st Battalion claimed to have killed North Korean troops in combat in February 2025. According to reports, the 92nd Brigade shared an area of responsibility with Ukraine's 47th Mechanized Brigade in Kursk Oblast.

In May 2025, in cooperation with the Khartiia Brigade, the 92nd Brigade recaptured lost positions north of the village of Lyptsi in northern Kharkiv Oblast.

== Current structure ==
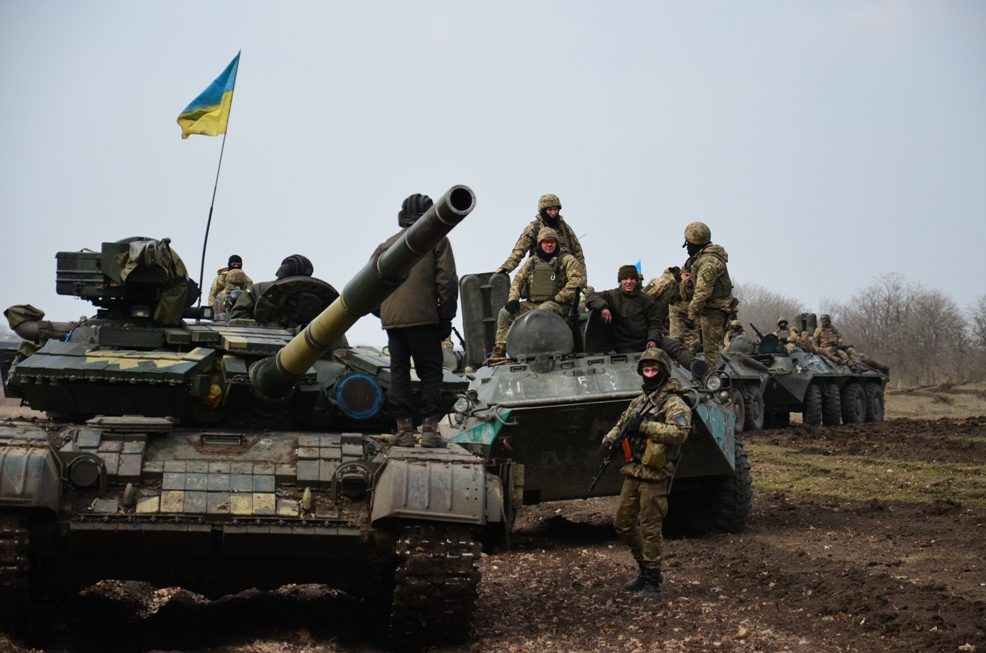
T-64BV of 92nd mechanized brigade

As of 2024, the brigade's structure is as follows:

- 92nd Assault Infantry Brigade (Mech), Kluhyno-Bashkyrivka
  - Headquarters & Headquarters Company
  - 1st Assault Battalion
    - Attack Drone Group "Flight Club"
  - 2nd Assault Battalion
    - Attack Drone Group "Honey Badger Dream Team"
  - 3rd Assault Battalion
  - 4th Assault Battalion
  - 5th Assault Battalion
  - Aerial Reconnaissance Unit "Code 9.2"
  - Unmanned Strike Aviation Systems Battalion "Achilles". Commander Yury Fedorenko
    - 1st Strike Company. Commander Chief Sergeant "Hulk".
  - 22nd Motorized Infantry Battalion "Kharkiv"
    - Aerial Reconnaissance Platoon
    - UAV Platoon "Aspid Group"
  - 92nd Tank Battalion (T-64BV and T-64BM2 Bulat)
  - 92nd Field Artillery Regiment
    - Headquarters & Target Acquisition Battery
    - Observer Battery
    - Self-propelled Artillery Battalion (2S3 Akatsiya)
    - Self-propelled Artillery Battalion (2S1 Gvozdika)
    - Rocket Artillery Battalion (BM-21 Grad)
    - Anti-tank Artillery Battalion (MT-12 Rapira)
  - Anti-Aircraft Defense Missile Artillery Battalion
  - Reconnaissance Battalion
    - Reconnaissance Platoon "Beshketnyky Sirka" ("Sirko's Hooligans")
  - Combat Engineer Battalion
  - Maintenance Battalion
  - Logistic Battalion
  - Electronic Warfare Company
  - Signal Company
  - Radar Company
  - Chemical, Biological, Radiological and Nuclear Defense Company
  - Medical Company
  - Brigade Band

== Traditions ==
In 2000, the Presidential Decree approved the full official name of the connection: "92 Separate Mechanized Ropshinsky Order of the October Revolution and the Red Banner of the Brigade."

In 2007, the command of the brigade sought before the Supreme Commander that the brigade would be given another name - "Chuhuïvs'ka".

On November 18, 2015, as part of the general military reform, Soviet honorary names were excluded from the name. According to the Decree of the President of Ukraine, the full official name of the connection: "92 separate mechanized brigade".

On August 22, 2019, the President of Ukraine awarded the brigade an honorary name: "92 Separate mechanized brigade named after Ivan Sirko's Cossack Otaman."

On May 6, 2022, the brigade was awarded the honorary distinction "For Courage and Bravery".

== See also ==
- List of military units named after people
