= Starytsia =

Rural locality in Kharkiv Oblast, Ukraine

Starytsia Стариця
- Rural settlement
- Interactive map of Starytsia
- Location within Kharkiv Oblast
- Coordinates: 50°14′30.04″N 36°47′47.73″E
- Country: Ukraine
- Oblast: Kharkiv Oblast
- Raion: Chuhuiv Raion
- Hromada: Vovchansk urban hromada

Area
  - Land: 9.48 km^{2} (3.66 sq mi)

Population (2022)
  - Total: 486
  - Density: 51.3/km^{2} (133/sq mi)
- Time zone: UTC+2 (EET)
  - Summer (DST): UTC+3 (EEST)

Starytsia (Ukrainian: Стариця, Russian: Стариця) is a rural settlement in Chuhuiv Raion, Kharkiv Oblast, Ukraine, located near the border with Russia. It belongs to Vovchansk urban hromada, one of the hromadas of Ukraine.

== History ==
The village was first mentioned in 1714.

In the early 1990s, the village included a collective farm named after Michurin, the "Echo" recreation center, a club, a medical center, a police station, a post office, a village council, and a school. Until 2020, the village was the administrative center of the Staritsa village council, which also included the village of Izbytske.

On 18 May 2024 Russian forces claimed to have taken control of the settlement. Ukrainian media has claimed that the village has been liberated and not been on the frontline since 22 July 2024. Since early 2025, it has been contested several times. By 26 January 2026, Russian forces captured the village.

== See also ==
- Vilcha
