= Andrey Alekseyenko =

Russian politician (born 1978)

- Андрей Алексеенко
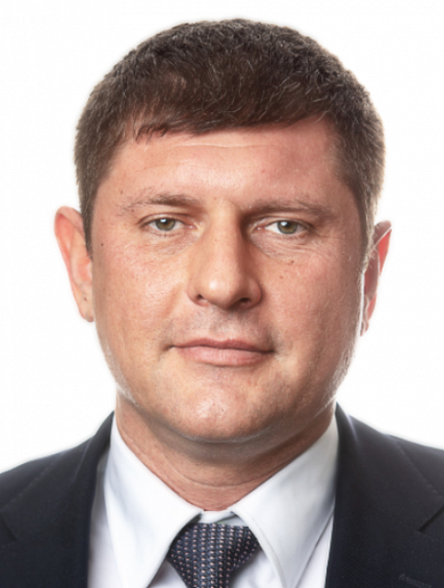

Prime Minister of the Kherson Oblast (Russian-installed)
- Incumbent
- Assumed office 25 November 2022
- Governor: Volodymyr Saldo
- Preceded by: Sergei Yeliseyev

Mayor of Krasnodar
- In office 21 October 2021 – 18 August 2022
- Preceded by: Yevgeny Pervyshov
- Succeeded by: Yevgeny Naumov

Chair of the Kharkov Military-Civilian Administration
- In office 19 August 2022 – 9 September 2022
- Preceded by: Post established
- Succeeded by: Post abolished

Personal details
- Born: April 23, 1978 (age 47) Novopokrovskaya, Russian SFSR
- Party: United Russia

Andrey Anatolievich Alekseyenko (Russian: Андрей Анатольевич Алексеенко; born 23 April 1978) is a Russian politician and economist who served as mayor of Krasnodar from 2021 to 2022.

Since 2022, he has been appointed by the Russian government to multiple high positions in the administrations of Russian-occupied Ukrainian territory. From August 19 to early September 2022, he served as the head of government of the Russian-occupied Kharkiv Oblast. After that administration largely collapsed due to the 2022 Kharkiv counteroffensive, he has served as prime minister of Russian-occupied Kherson Oblast.

== Early life ==
Alekseyenko is from Kuban. He studied engineering and economics at Kuban State Agrarian University in Krasnodar, and later obtained a degree of Candidate of Sciences in economics. Starting in 1996, he worked in a construction company, rising from being a foreman to the position of technical supervision engineer. He became the director of the volleyball federation of Krasnodar Krai.

== Political career ==
=== Krasnodar Krai politics ===
He joined the political party United Russia. From 2007 to 2010, he ran Krasnodar Krai's department for economic affairs and international relations. In 2010, he became head of the administration of Tuapse. In September 2015, he briefly took a similar position in Yeysk. In September 2017, he became Deputy Governor of Krasnodar Krai, where he was responsible in part for municipal infrastructure, investment, and local government property. On October 21, 2021, he became interim mayor of Krasnodar, and was officially appointed to the position on November 17 of the same year. In December 2021, he was charged with accepting a large bribe in the form of a very expensive gun worth 1.6 million rubles three years earlier.

He was awarded a medal for his contributions to the development of Krasnodar Krai.

=== Activities in Russian-occupied Ukraine ===
In 2022, he supported the Russian invasion of Ukraine, helping recruit soldiers and visiting the occupied territories several times. On August 18, 2022, he resigned as mayor of Krasnodar. The next day, he was appointed as the deputy head of the Kharkiv military-civilian administration, initially based in Kupiansk. Around September 8, the administration was moved to Vovchansk due to the 2022 Kharkiv counteroffensive, and two days later on the 10th, the Russian officials also left that city as well.

On November 25, 2022, he was appointed Prime Minister of the Russian-occupied parts of the Kherson Oblast, where he deals with integrating the institutions of the occupied region into the legal, economic, and social system of the Russian Federation. On December 12, he received the Order of Courage from the Russian government "for courage and dedication shown in rescuing people in an emergency" and "for courageous and decisive actions performed in the line of duty."

=== Controversies ===
In December 2021, a criminal case was initiated against Alekseyenko on charges of receiving a bribe on a particularly large scale in the form of an expensive hunting rifle. According to Kommersant, as of August 2022 the criminal proceedings had not been closed. Alekseyenko admitted to receiving the weapon but maintained that it was a birthday gift.

== Personal life ==
He is married, and has three children.
