= Vitaly Ganchev =

Ukrainian soldier

- Виталий Ганчев
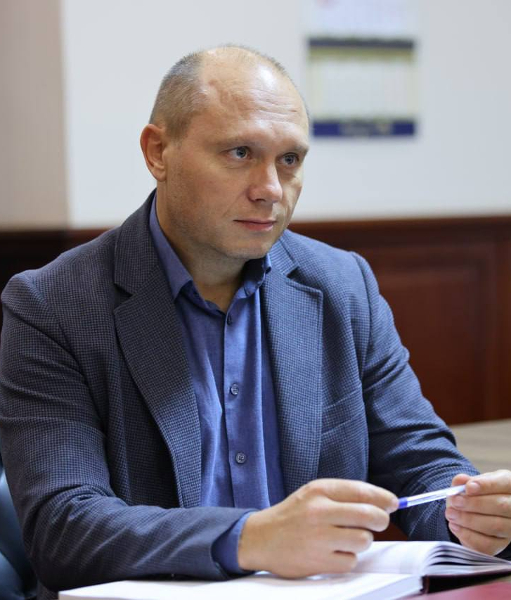
- Ganchev in 2024

Head of the Kharkov Military-Civil Administration
- Incumbent
- Assumed office 3 June 2022
- Preceded by: Position established

Head of the administration of the village of Kazachya Lopan
- In office 3 March – 3 June 2022

Head of the economic security department of the Zhovtnevy district militsiya
- In office 27 April 2014 – 3 Macrh 2022
- President: Igor Plotnisky; Leonid Pasechnik
- Head of Government: Vasily Nikitin

Deputy Head of the Militsiya department in Derhachi Raion
- In office 13 February 2013 – 27 April 2014
- President: Viktor Yanukovych
- Head of Government: Mykola Azarov

Personal details
- Born: 24 May 1975 (age 51) Kharkiv, Kharkiv Oblast, Ukrainian SSR, Soviet Union
- Education: National Academy of Internal Affairs

Military service
- Allegiance: Ukraine (2009–2011; 2013–2014); LPR (2014–2022)
- Years of service: 2009–2011; 2013–2022
- Rank: Lieutenant Colonel
- Unit: Ukrainian Ministry of Internal Affairs; Militsiya; LPR Ministry of Internal Affairs

Vitaly Konstantinovich Ganchev (Russian: Виталий Константинович Ганчев; Ukrainian: Віталій Костянтинович Ганчев, romanized: Vitalii Kostiantynovych Hanchev; born 24 May 1975) is pro-Russian politician and law enforcement officer. He is the Head of the Kharkov Military-Civil Administration since 3 June 2022.

He was the head of economic security department in the Zhovtnevyi District within the city of Luhansk.

== Early life and career ==
Ganchev was born on May 24, 1975, in Kharkiv, he graduated from Secondary School N 31 (1990) and the National University of Internal Affairs in Kyiv (2008).

In 2011, Ganchev worked in the Department of Citizenship, Immigration, and Registration of Individuals at the Kharkiv Oblast Administration.

In 2013, Ganchev served as the Deputy Head of the city Dergachev Department of the Ministry of Internal Affairs of Ukraine, holding the rank of Lieutenant Colonel of Police.

In 2014, he moved to Luhansk, where he was appointed Head of the Economic Security Department of the Zhovtnevy District Department of the Ministry of Internal Affairs of the Luhansk People's Republic, with the rank of Colonel.

== Political career ==
In 2014, he helped support the 2014 pro-Russian unrest in Ukraine, and was sought by the pro-Russian separatist Luhansk People's Republic as a potential collaborator. According to the pro-Ukrainian NGO "Myrotvorets", Ganchev moved to Luhansk Oblast in 2014, and became the head of the department of economic security in Zhovtnevyi District within the city of Luhansk. He also had the rank of lieutenant colonel.

=== Russian invasion of Ukraine ===
In 2022, following the Russian invasion of Ukraine, Russian forces began the Russian occupation of Kharkiv Oblast, with Ganchev responsible for the administration in the settlement of Kozacha Lopan. In April, Russian authorities announced their intention to appoint Ganchev as the head of administration in occupied Kharkiv Oblast. On 3 June, pro-Russian authorities organized a meeting in Kupyansk, and officially named Ganchev as the governor of the occupational administration. Six days later, on 9 June, the Security Service of Ukraine officially placed Ganchev on a wanted list for treason and collaborative activities.

During his position as de facto governor of occupied Kharkiv Oblast, he discussed plans for annexation of the territories into Russia. He also supported the creation of pro-Russian symbols, such as a new flag and a new emblem, along with making Russian the official language.

In September 2022, the Ukrainian military carried out the 2022 Kharkiv counteroffensive, which successfully retook most of the territories in Russian-occupied Kharkiv Oblast. The Russian authorities shortly moved the administrative center from Kupyansk to Vovchansk on the 8th, but the city soon fell also, and Ganchev fled to Belgorod Oblast in Russia. This was evident when Ganchev appeared in a photo op along with two Russian officials, Vyacheslav Gladkov and Andrey Turchak.

=== Western sanctions ===
In July 2023, the British government added Ganchev to its sanctions list for supporting Russian actions in Ukraine. The US Government also placed Ganchev under its sanctions list in February 2024.

== See also ==
- Collaboration with Russia during the Russian invasion of Ukraine
