= Cherkaski Tyshky =

Village in Kharkiv Oblast, Ukraine

Cherkaski Tyshky Черкаські Тишки
- Village
- Interactive map of Cherkaski Tyshky
- Location of Cherkaski Tyshky within Ukraine Cherkaski Tyshky (Ukraine)
- Coordinates: 50.116389°N 36.396944°E
- Country: Ukraine
- Oblast: Kharkiv Oblast
- District: Kharkiv Raion
- Founded: 1656

Area
  - Total: 2.63 km^{2} (1.02 sq mi)
- Elevation: 107 m (351 ft)

Population (2001 census)
  - Total: 1,164
  - Density: 443/km^{2} (1,150/sq mi)
- Time zone: UTC+2 (EET)
  - Summer (DST): UTC+3 (EEST)
- Postal code: 62440
- Area code: +380 57
- KATOTTH: UA63120290080050947

Cherkaski Tyshky (Ukrainian: Черкаські Тишки; Russian: Черкасские Тишки) is a village in the Kharkiv Raion (district) of Ukraine's Kharkiv Region. It is located about 10 kilometres (6.2 mi) north-east of Kharkiv, the country's second largest city. To the north-east it borders the village of Ruski Tyshky. Both belong to the Tsyrkuny rural hromada, one of the many hromadas in Ukraine.

== Geography ==
The village of Cherkaski Tyshky is located northeast of Kharkiv/ The village is located on the banks of the Kharkov River (Siverskyi Donets basin). Upstream, 1 km, is the village of Tsyrkuny.

Cherkaski Tyshky is located on the slopes of the Central Russian Upland, in the forest-steppe natural zone. The climate of the territory has a temperate continental type with cold winters and hot summers. The average annual temperature is +8.7 °C (in January -4.5, in July +22). The average annual precipitation is 520 mm. The greatest amount of precipitation falls in summer.

Around the village are summer cottages and broad-leaved and pine forests.

== History ==
The village was first mentioned in 1660.

According to data in 1864, 2,078 people (1,011 male and 1,067 female) lived in the village, there were 251 farm households, an Orthodox church and a post office.

In 1914, the number of inhabitants in the village was 5,446.

=== After the Russian invasion ===
Since the Russian invasion of Ukraine the village was under Russian occupation until May 10, 2022. "Russian forces occupied Cherkaski Tyshky on 24 February 2022, the first day of the invasion, and used it as a base from which to shell Kharkiv." After the village was liberated in May 2022, the Russian forces withdrew across the river and started shelling Cherkaski Tyshky from there.
