= Lebiazhe, Chuhuiv Raion, Kharkiv Oblast =

Lebiazhe Лебяже
- Village
- Interactive map of Lebiazhe
- Location of Lebyazhe within Ukraine Lebiazhe (Ukraine)
- Coordinates: 49.803056°N 36.905833°E
- Country: Ukraine
- Oblast: Kharkiv Oblast
- Raion: Chuhuiv Raion
- Hromada: Chkalovske settlement hromada
- Founded: 1707

Area
  - Total: 2.26 km^{2} (0.87 sq mi)
- Elevation: 101 m (331 ft)

Population (2001 census)
  - Estimate (August 2022): 208
- Time zone: UTC+2 (EET)
  - Summer (DST): UTC+3 (EEST)
- Postal code: 63530
- Area code: +380 5746

Lebyazhe (Ukrainian: Леб'яже; Russian: Лебяжье) is a village in Kharkiv Oblast (district) in Chuhuiv Raion of eastern Ukraine, about 51.5 kilometres (32.0 mi) southeast by east from the centre of Kharkiv city.

The village came under attack by Russian forces in April 2022, during the Russian invasion of Ukraine.
