= Novopokrovka, Kharkiv Oblast =

Rural locality in Kharkiv Oblast, Ukraine

Novopokrovka Новопокровка
- Rural settlement
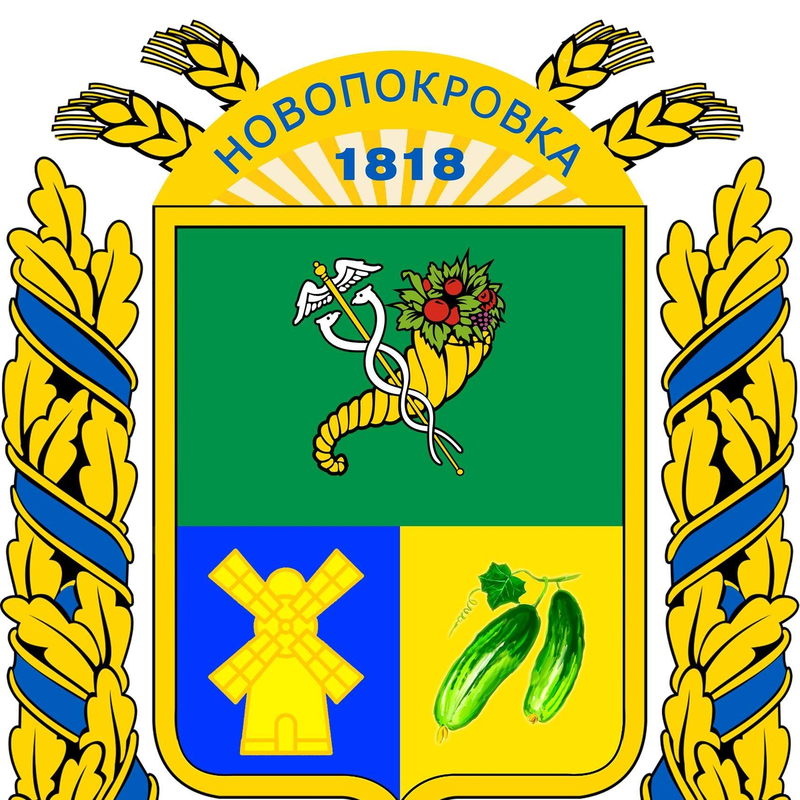
- Coat of arms

- Location in Kharkiv Oblast Location in Ukraine
- Coordinates: 49°50′00″N 36°33′13″E
- Country: Ukraine
- Oblast: Kharkiv Oblast
- Raion: Chuhuiv Raion

Population (2022)
  - Total: 4,662
- Time zone: UTC+2 (EET)
  - Summer (DST): UTC+3 (EEST)

Novopokrovka (Ukrainian: Новопокровка) is a rural settlement in Chuhuiv Raion of Kharkiv Oblast in Ukraine. It is located on the left bank of the Udy, a tributary of the Donets. Novopokrovka hosts the administration of Novopokrovka settlement hromada, one of the hromadas of Ukraine. Population: 4,662 (2022 estimate).

Until 26 January 2024, Novopokrovka was designated urban-type settlement. On this day, a new law entered into force which abolished this status, and Novopokrovka became a rural settlement.

== Geography ==
Novopokrovka is located in the central and northern parts of the Kharkiv Oblast. The area of Novopokrovka is located on the Central Russian Upland, within the forest steppe natural zone. The relief of the settlement is an undulating plain with ravines and gullies.

The climate of Novopokrovka is temperate continental with cold winters and hot summers. The average annual temperature is +8.7 °C (in January -4.5, in July +22). The average annual rainfall is 520 mm. The highest rainfall occurs in the summer. There are large forest areas (pine and deciduous trees) on the territory of the settlement. Novopokrovka is located on the left bank of the Siverskyi Donets River, 4 km from the town of Chuguev. The soils of the community are chernozems and meadow soils.

== Economy ==
Agriculture and processing industries will be developed in the village; Novopokrovka is known for its flour and greenhouse vegetables.

=== Transportation ===
Pokrovka railway station is located in Novopokrovka. It is on the railway connecting Kharkiv and Kupiansk.

5 kilometres (3.1 mi) north of Novopokrovka is the M03 Kyiv-Kharkiv-Dovzhansky highway.
