= MS Lastivka =

- MS Lastivka at the wharf by Proletarska square, Kharkiv

History

Ukraine
- Name: MS Lastivka (English: Swallow)
- Namesake: Swallow Bird (from Russian: Ласточка)
- Route: Rivers of Lopan and Kharkiv
- Builder: Moscow Shipyard, USSR
- Launched: 1975
- In service: 1975-2005, in Kharkiv - since 1996
- Out of service: 2005
- Renamed: 1996, former name - Pavlik Morozov
- Homeport: Kharkiv, Ukraine (heretofore - Dnipropetrovsk, Ukraine
- Fate: Burned out

General characteristics
- Displacement: 30 tons
- Length: 22.4 m (73 ft)
- Beam: 4.06 m (13.3 ft)
- Height: 3 metres
- Draught: <40 centimetres
- Installed power: 60 horsepower
- Capacity: About 66 passengers

Lastivka (Ukrainian: Ластівка, Swallow) or Lastochka (Russian: Ласточка) was the only pleasure motor ship in Kharkiv, Ukraine during its contemporary history. From 1996 till 2005 it carried passengers on the rivers of Lopan and Kharkiv. On 1 April 2005 in daytime the motorship burned out in unclear circumstances.

== History ==
MS Lastivka was built in 1975 at Moscow Shipyard, USSR. Former name of the ship — Pavlik Morozov (homeport Dnipropetrovsk). Until its move to Kharkiv the ship ploughed waters of the Dnieper.

In 1995 by efforts of O. Sazonov MS Pavlik Morozov that had been in a sad state was moved from Dnipropetrovsk to Kharkiv using special 30-meters carriage. Restoration and reconstruction works were conducted on the river of Kharkiv in the other side of Chyhyryn bridge.
