= Molodova =

Molodova Молодова
- Village
- Location within Kharkiv Oblast Location within Ukraine
- Country: Ukraine
- Oblast: Kharkiv Oblast
- Raion: Chuhuiv Raion

Population (2001)
  - Total: 595
- Postal code: 62563

Molodova (Ukrainian: Молодова) is a village (selo) of Ukraine, in Chuhuiv Raion, Kharkiv Oblast. It has a population of 595.

== History ==
During the Holodomor, 122 people died in the village.

=== 2022 Russian invasion of Ukraine ===
During the 2022 Russian invasion of Ukraine, the village came under Russian occupation. It was recaptured by Ukraine's 92nd Mechanized Brigade on May 3, 2022.

== Gallery ==
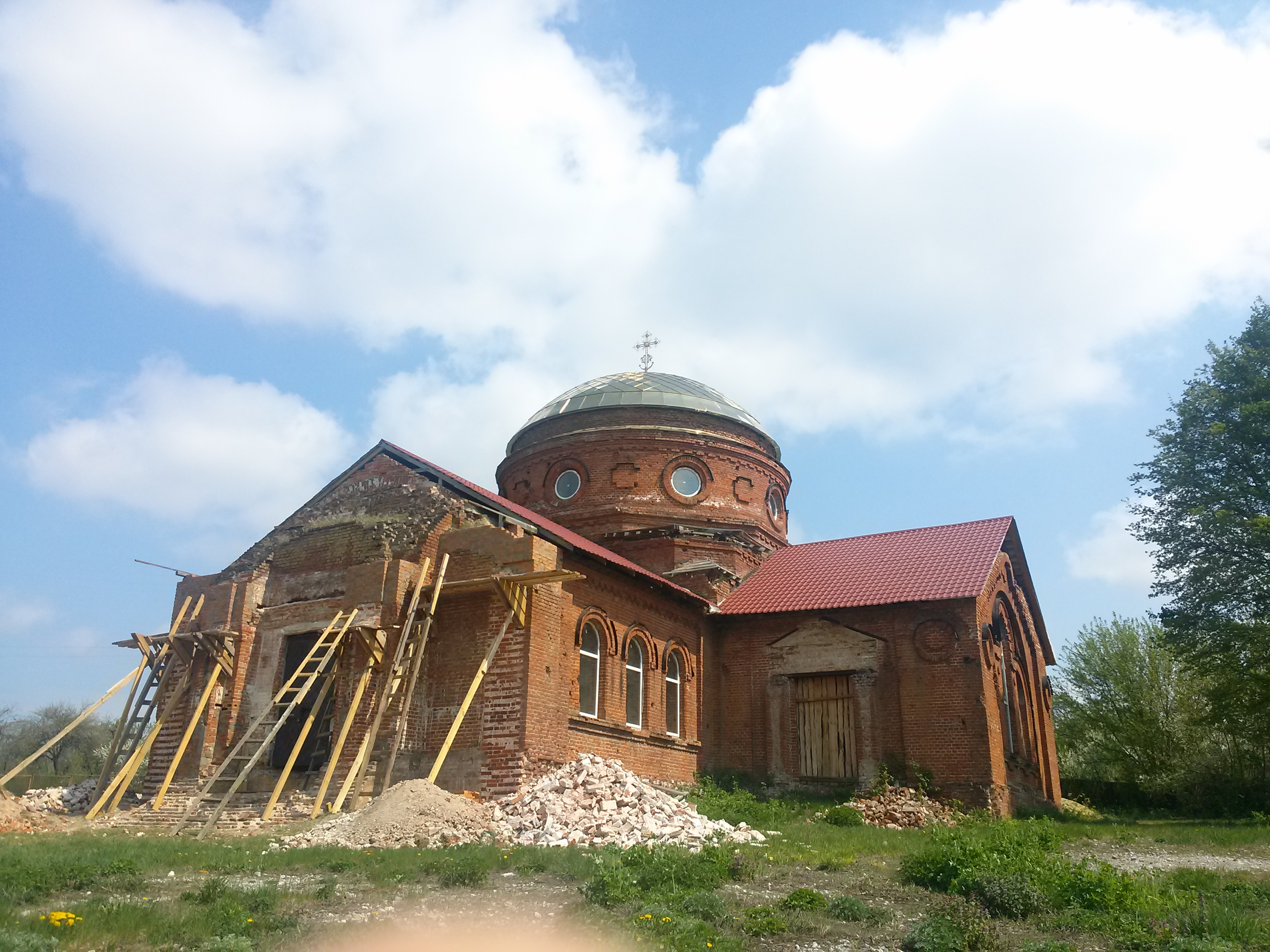
Church of the Epiphany during restoration in Molodova

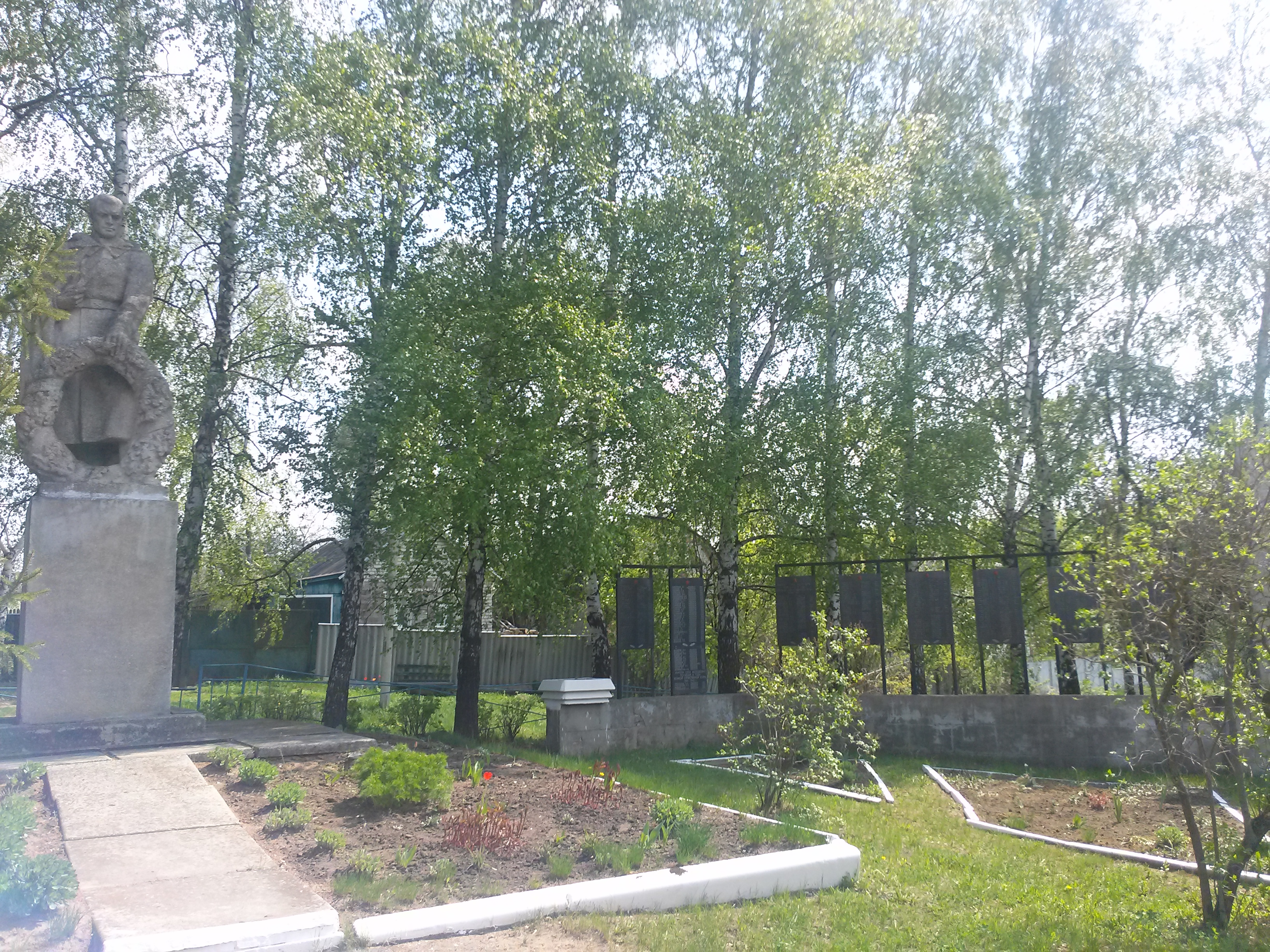
World War II memorial
