= Bazaliivka =

Village in Kharkiv Oblast, Ukraine

Bazaliivka Базаліївка
- Village
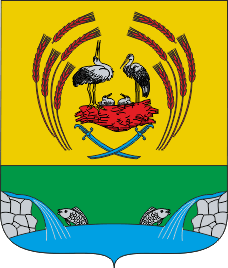
- Coat of arms
- Interactive map of Bazaliivka
- Location of Bazaliivka within Ukraine Bazaliivka (Ukraine)
- Coordinates: 49.83°N 36.995833°E
- Country: Ukraine
- Oblast: Kherson Oblast
- District: Chuhuiv Raion
- Founded: 1673

Area
  - Total: 2.37 km^{2} (0.92 sq mi)
- Elevation: 139 m (456 ft)

Population (2001 census)
  - Total: 609
  - Density: 257/km^{2} (666/sq mi)
- Time zone: UTC+2 (EET)
  - Summer (DST): UTC+3 (EEST)
- Postal code: 63531
- Area code: +380 5746

Bazaliivka (Ukrainian: Базаліївка; Russian: Базалиевка/Базалеевка) is a village in Chuhuiv Raion of Kharkiv Oblast in Ukraine, about 56 kilometres (35 mi) east-southeast of the centre of Kharkiv city. It belongs to Chkalovske settlement hromada, one of the hromadas of Ukraine.

The village came under attack by Russian forces in 2022, during the Russian invasion of Ukraine.

== Demographics ==
Native language distribution as of the Ukrainian Census of 2001:

- Ukrainian: 90.32%
- Russian: 9.09%
- other languages: 0.59%
