= Tsyrkuny =

Village in Kharkiv Oblast, Ukraine

Tsyrkuny Циркуни
- Village
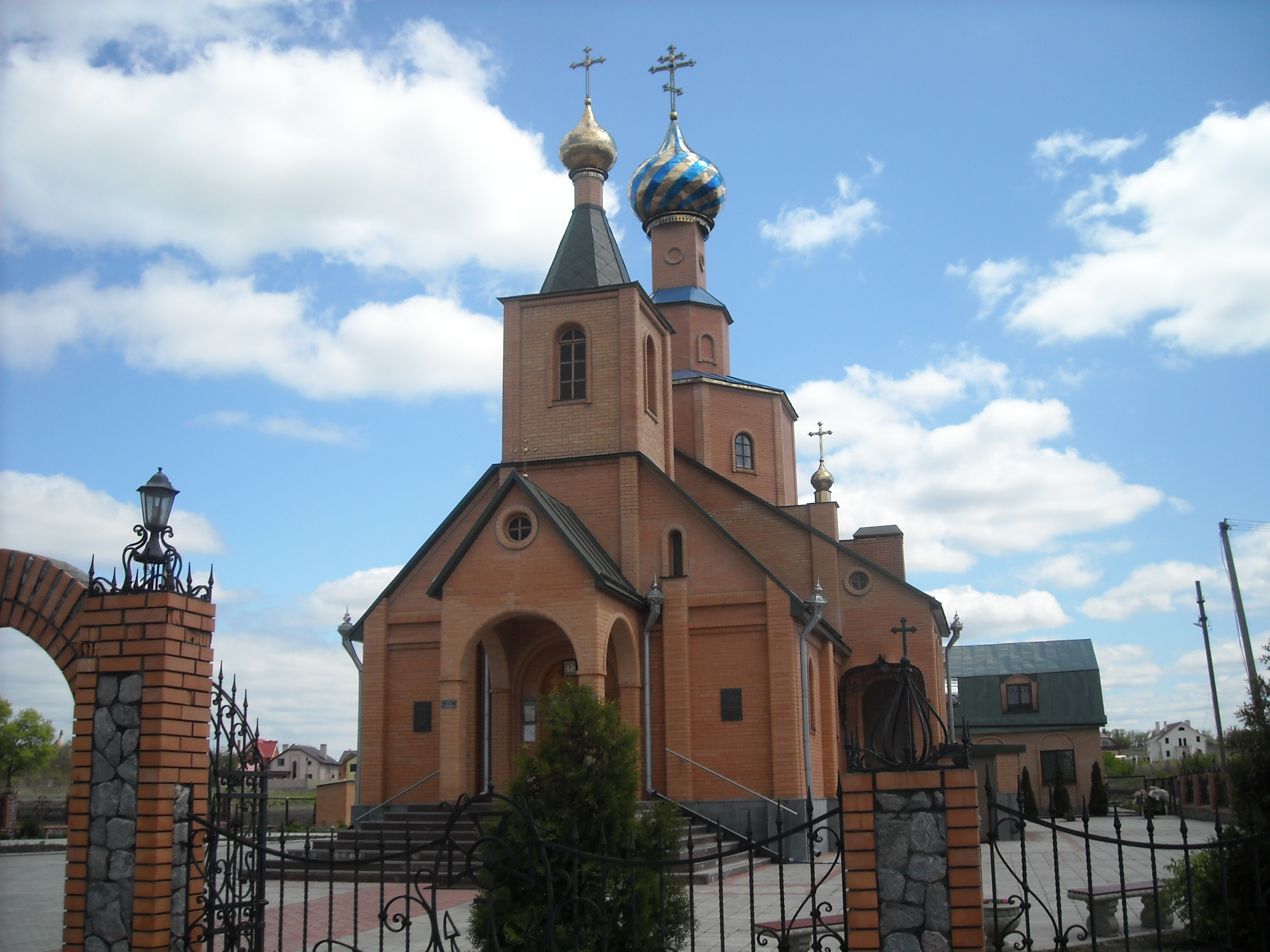
- St. Nicholas Church

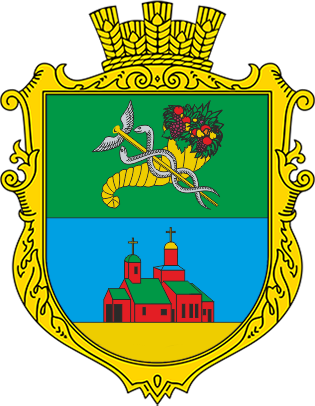
- Seal
- Interactive map of Tsyrkuny
- Location of Tsyrkuny within Ukraine Tsyrkuny (Ukraine)
- Coordinates: 50.0875°N 36.386944°E
- Country: Ukraine
- Oblast: Kharkiv Oblast
- District: Kharkiv Raion
- Founded: 1775

Area
  - Total: 0.227 km^{2} (0.088 sq mi)
- Elevation: 119 m (390 ft)

Population (2001 census)
  - Total: 6,310
  - Density: 27,800/km^{2} (72,000/sq mi)
- Time zone: UTC+2 (EET)
  - Summer (DST): UTC+3 (EEST)
- Postal code: 62441
- Area code: +380 57
- KATOTTH: UA63120290000021734

Tsyrkuny (Ukrainian: Циркуни) is a village in Kharkiv Raion (district) in Kharkiv Oblast of eastern Ukraine, at about 16 kilometres (9.9 mi) north-east from the centre of Kharkiv city. It hosts the administration of Tsyrkuny rural hromada, one of the hromadas of Ukraine.

The settlement came under attack by Russian forces during the Russian invasion of Ukraine in 2022.

== Demographics ==
The settlement had 6310 inhabitants in 2001, native language distribution as of the Ukrainian Census of 2001:

- Ukrainian: 75.88%
- Russian: 23.20%
- Belarusian: 0.25%
- Moldovan (Romanian): 0.22%
- Armenian: 0.17%
- other languages: 0.56%

== Geography ==
The village of Tsyrkuny is located northeast of Kharkiv, on the outskirts of the city. The village is located on the banks of the Kharkov River (Siverskyi Donets basin). Upstream, 1 km, is the village of Cherkassky Tyshky.

Tsyrkuny is located on the slopes of the Central Russian Upland, in the forest-steppe natural zone. The climate of the territory has a temperate continental type with cold winters and hot summers. The average annual temperature is +8.7 °C (in January -4.5, in July +22). The average annual precipitation is 520 mm. The greatest amount of precipitation falls in summer.

Around the village are summer cottages and broad-leaved and pine forests. To the southwest of the village passes the M03 highway (Kharkiv district road).

== History ==
The village was first mentioned in 1671.

According to data from 1864, the village had a population of 2,707 people (1,255 males and 1,452 females), 278 households, and an Orthodox church.

As of 1914, the number of inhabitants was 6,416 people. During the Holodomor organized by the Soviet authorities in 1932-1933, at least 257 residents of the village died.

In September 2012, part of the village was included in the city of Kharkiv.

=== Russian occupation in 2022 ===
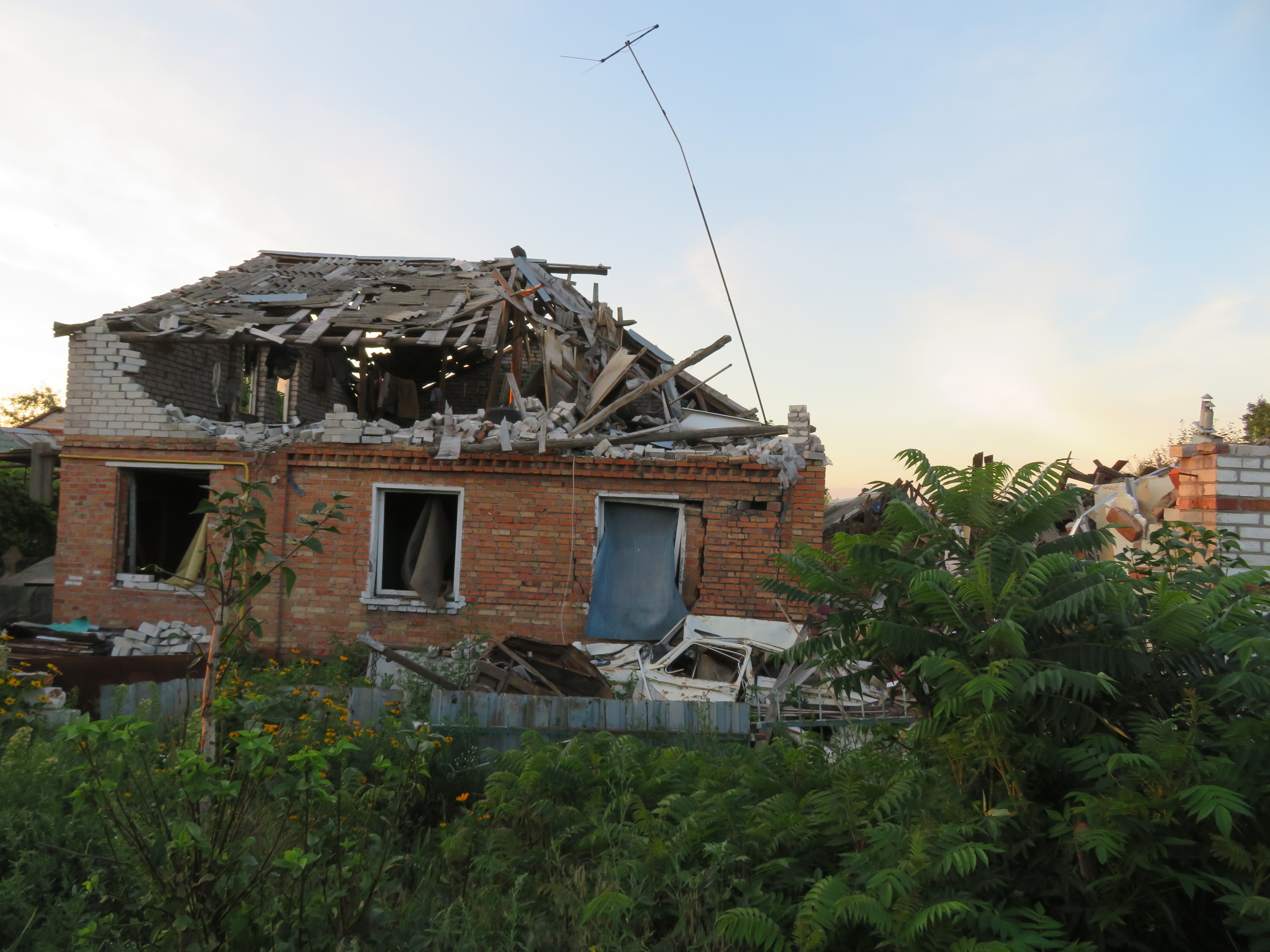
A damaged house in Tsyrkuny as the result of a battle. July 2022

On 24 February 2022, the village was occupied by the Russian Armed Forces, after which it became a stronghold for tank attacks on Kharkiv and artillery shelling of the Pivtsyncha Saltivka district. Russian media outlets present this as if the Ukrainian Armed Forces were shelling the village for no reason, ignoring the fierce fighting near the Kharkiv bypass. Residents are not allowed to evacuate to the territory controlled by Ukraine, and the delivery of humanitarian aid from there is also blocked. Instead, Russian military personnel are offering residents to evacuate to the occupying country. The Russian occupiers lost control of the village on 7 May 2022. The shelling of the village continued later.
