= Ruski Tyshky =

Village in Kharkiv Oblast, Ukraine

Ruski Tyshky Руські Тишки
- Village
- Interactive map of Ruski Tyshky
- Location of Ruski Tyshky within Ukraine Ruski Tyshky (Ukraine)
- Coordinates: 50.135556°N 36.403056°E
- Country: Ukraine
- Oblast: Kharkiv Oblast
- District: Kharkiv Raion
- Founded: 1663

Area
  - Total: 3.08 km^{2} (1.19 sq mi)
- Elevation: 113 m (371 ft)

Population (Estimate (2023))
  - Total: 3,500
  - Density: 1,136/km^{2} (2,940/sq mi)
- (As of 24th May 2023)
- Time zone: UTC+2 (EET)
  - Summer (DST): UTC+3 (EEST)
- Postal code: 62440
- Area code: +380 57

Ruski Tyshky (Ukrainian: Руські Тишки) is a village in Ukraine in Kharkiv Raion, Kharkiv Oblast, about 25 kilometres (16 miles) northeast of Kharkiv, Ukraine's second largest city. To the south-west Ruski Tyshky borders the village of Cherkaski Tyshky. It forms part of the Tsyrkuny rural district (hromada), one of Ukraine's many hromadas .

== Since Russia's invasion ==
Ruski Tyshky came under attack in spring 2022, during the Russian invasion of Ukraine and was occupied until May that year. After its liberation, the village was subjected to regular shelling by Russian forces.

== Geography ==
Ruski Tyshky is located on the banks of the Kharkiv River where it meets the River Murom (left tributary), 1.5 km upstream is the village of Borshchova; downstream lies the neighbouring village of Cherkaski Tyshky. The dam of the Muromske Reservoir is located 2 km upstream of the Murom river.
