= Prolisne =

Rural locality in Kharkiv Oblast, Ukraine

Prolisne Пролісне
- Rural settlement
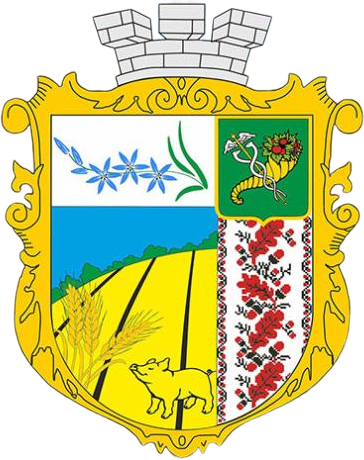
- Coat of arms
- Interactive map of Prolisne
- Location in Kharkiv Oblast Location in Ukraine
- Coordinates: 49°43′02″N 36°56′02″E
- Country: Ukraine
- Oblast: Kharkiv Oblast
- Raion: Chuhuiv Raion
- Hromada: Chkalovske settlement hromada

Population (2022)
  - Total: 3,664
- Time zone: UTC+2 (EET)
  - Summer (DST): UTC+3 (EEST)

Prolisne (Ukrainian: Пролісне), formerly Chkalovske (Ukrainian: Чкаловське, Russian: Чкаловское) is a rural settlement in Chuhuiv Raion of Kharkiv Oblast in Ukraine. It is located in the steppe east of the city of Chuhuiv and west of Kupiansk. Prolisne hosts the administration of Chkalovske settlement hromada, one of the hromadas of Ukraine. The settlement's population is 3,664 (2022 estimate)

== History ==
=== 2022 Russian invasion of Ukraine ===
From 16 March to 8 September, Chkalovske was occupied by Russian forces during the Russian invasion of Ukraine.

Until 26 January 2024, Chkalovske was designated urban-type settlement. On this day, a new law entered into force which abolished this status, and Chkalovske became a rural settlement.

On 19 September 2024, the Verkhovna Rada voted to rename Chkalovske to Prolisne.

== Economy ==
=== Transportation ===
Prolisnyi railway station is located in Prolisne. It is on the railway connecting Kharkiv and Kupiansk via Chuhuiv. There is regular passenger traffic.

The settlement has road access to Highway M03 connecting Kharkiv and Sloviansk as well as to Highway H23 connecting Kharkiv and Sievierodonetsk via Kupiansk.
