= Tykhe, Kharkiv Oblast =

Settlement village in Kharkiv Oblast

Tykhe Тихе
- Village
- Interactive map of Tykhe
- Location of Tykhe within Ukraine Tykhe (Ukraine)
- Coordinates: 50.305°N 37.014444°E
- Country: Ukraine
- Oblast: Kharkiv Oblast
- Raion: Chuhuiv Raion
- Hromada: Vovchansk urban hromada
- Founded: 1670

Area
  - Total: 1.11 km^{2} (0.43 sq mi)
- Elevation: 166 m (545 ft)

Population (2001 census)
  - Total: 163
  - Density: 147/km^{2} (380/sq mi)
- Time zone: UTC+2 (EET)
  - Summer (DST): UTC+3 (EEST)
- Postal code: 62508
- Area code: +380 5741

Tykhe (Ukrainian: Тихе; Russian: Тихое) is a village in Vovchansk urban hromada, Chuhuiv Raion, Kharkiv Oblast, eastern Ukraine. It is located 60.48 kilometres (37.58 mi) northeast by east (NEbE) of the centre of Kharkiv city, about 4.09 kilometres (2.54 mi) south of the Russia–Ukraine border.

== Geography ==
Tykhe lies on the right bank of the Vovcha river.

== History ==
The settlement was founded in 1670.

=== Russian invasion of Ukraine 2022 ===
The village came under attack by Russian forces during the 2024 Kharkiv offensive of the Russian invasion of Ukraine. On 17 October 2025, the village was captured by advancing Russian forces.

== Demographics ==
As of the 2001 Ukrainian census, the settlement had 163 inhabitants, whose native languages were 65.85% Ukrainian, 32.32% Russian, 0.61% Belarusian, 0.61% Bulgarian and 0.61% Polish.
