= Kharkiv Ring Road =

Ring road in Kharkiv, Ukraine

- Окружна́ автомобі́льна доро́га
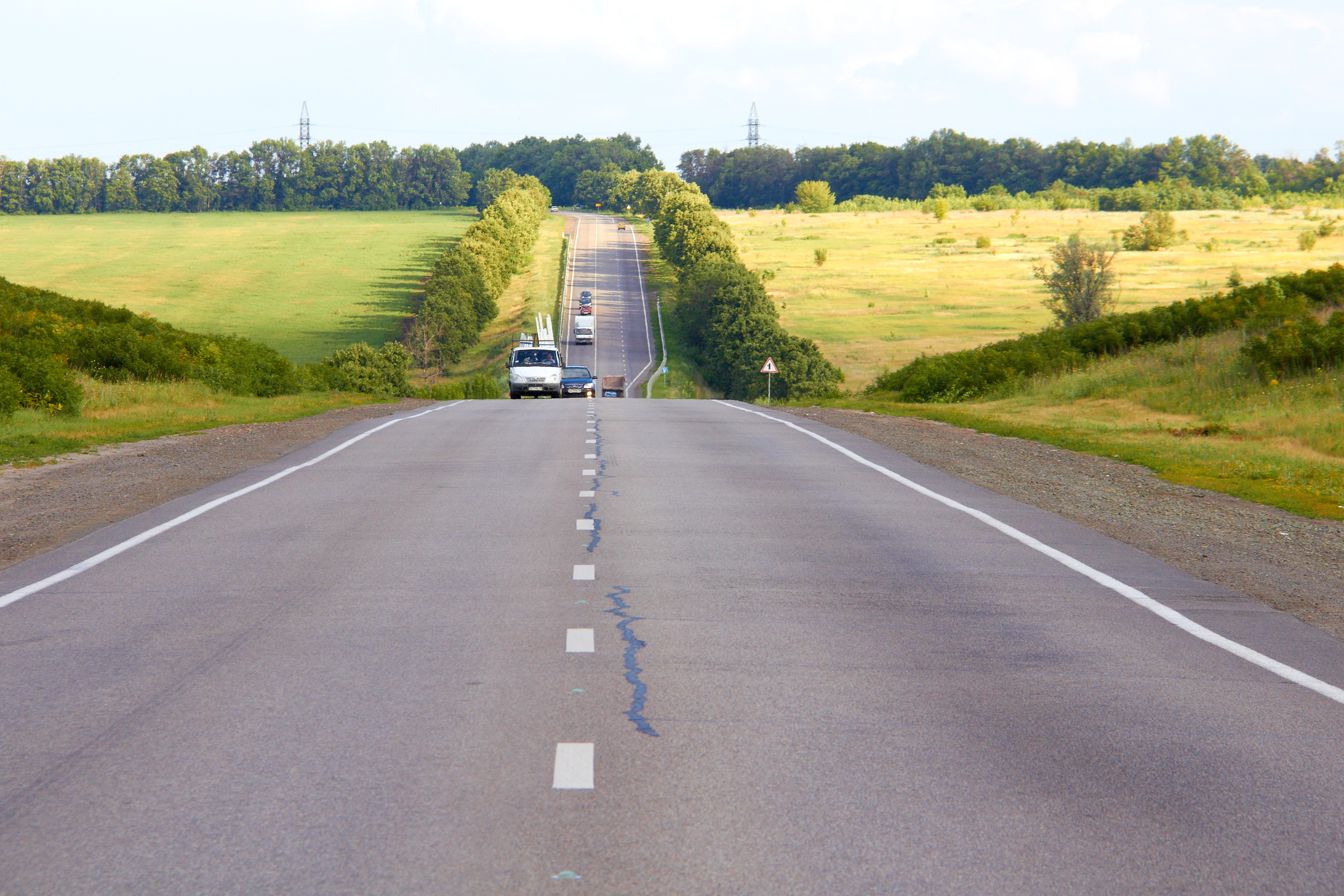

Route information
- Length: 82.7 km (51.4 mi)

Location
- Country: Ukraine

Highway system
- Roads in Ukraine; State Highways

The Kharkiv Ring Road (Ukrainian: Окружна́ автомобі́льна доро́га) is a ring road in Kharkiv and Kharkiv Oblast, running mainly along the administrative border of the city. The length of the road is 82.7 km (51.4 mi), the width of the carriageway in different sections is from 9–18 metres (30–59 ft).

== Reconstruction ==
As part of Ukraine's preparations for the UEFA Euro 2012, it was planned to repair and modernize the ring road to comply with its I technical category of road quality. On 10 August 2010, its overhaul began, and on 12 November, the road was solemnly opened after reconstruction. The cost of the work amounted to 320 million hryvnia (about $40 million).
