= Izbytske =

Village in Kharkiv Oblast, Ukraine

Izbytske Ізбицьке
- Village
- Interactive map of Izbytske
- Location of Fyholivka within Ukraine Izbytske (Ukraine)
- Coordinates: 50.205556°N 36.745278°E
- Country: Ukraine
- Oblast: Kharkiv Oblast
- Raion: Chuhuiv Raion
- Hromada: Vovchansk urban hromada
- Founded: 1775

Area
  - Total: 0.251 km^{2} (0.097 sq mi)
- Elevation: 150 m (490 ft)

Population (2001 census)
  - Total: 37
  - Density: 150/km^{2} (380/sq mi)
- Time zone: UTC+2 (EET)
  - Summer (DST): UTC+3 (EEST)
- Postal code: 62530
- Area code: +380 5741
- KATOTTH: UA63140010330020167

Izbytske (Ukrainian: Ізбицьке; Russian: Избицкое) is a village (selo) in Chuhuiv Raion (district) in Kharkiv Oblast of eastern Ukraine, located 38.24 kilometres (23.76 mi) northeast (NE) of the centre of Kharkiv city. It belongs to Vovchansk urban hromada, one of the hromadas of Ukraine.

== Demographics ==
As of the 2001 Ukrainian census, the settlement had 37 inhabitants, whose native languages were 90.00% Ukrainian and 10.00% Russian.
