= Chkalovske settlement hromada =

Administrative unit in Kharkiv Oblast, Ukraine

Chkalovske settlement hromada Чкаловська селищна громада
- Hromada
- Flag Seal
- Interactive map of Chkalovske settlement hromada
- Country: Ukraine
- Oblast: Kharkiv Oblast
- Raion: Chuhuiv Raion

Government
  - Head: Head of the Chkalovsk settlement military administration of the Chuguyiv district of the Kharkiv region, Kotenko Serhiy Ivanovych

Area
  - Total: 389.7 km^{2} (150.5 sq mi)

Population (2022)
  - Total: 11,682
  - Density: 29.98/km^{2} (77.64/sq mi)
- Settlements: 20
- Rural settlements: 3
- Villages: 17
- Website: https://chkalovskaotg.gov.ua/

Chkalovske settlement hromada (Ukrainian: Чкаловська селищна територіальна громада, romanized: Chkalovska selyshchna terytorialna hromada) is a hromada (territorial community) in Ukraine, in south-east Chuhuiv Raion, Kharkiv Oblast. The administrative centre is the rural settlement of Prolisne.The population of the hromada was 11,682 (2022 estimate) before the start of the Russo-Ukrainian war. The Siverskyi Donets flows through the area.

The Chkalovske Amalgamated Hromada, formed on 13 May 2016 following a decision of the Chkalovske rural council, includes 18 localities: Chkalovske, and the villages of Doslidne, Mykolaivka, Havrylivka, Nova Hnylytsia, Ivanivka, Mykhailivka, Rtyshchivka, Stepove, Studenok, Korobchyne, Osykovyi Hai, Lebiazhe, Mykolaivka, Pushkarne, Tahanka, Bazaliivka, and Yurchenkove. A village headman and 26 Chkalovske Rural Council deputies were elected.following the first election on 31 July 2016.

== Climate ==
Chkalovske hromada is located in the temperate zone, the climate is temperate continental. Since the community is located in the middle latitudes, the total annual solar radiation varies according to the seasons and is about 95,1 Kcal per cm2, the annual amount of precipitation in form of rain and snow is about 520 mm. In this area North and North-West winds are dominated. The highest temperature (more than +40 °C) was observed in the meteorological station in the city of Chuguev and the lowest was -35 °C. The winter is not very cold here but summer is hot. The climate is more influenced by geographical latitude, altitude above the sea level (700 m), the distance from ocean, the terrain, which surrounds the territory of the region, the nature of the underlying surface. In general, the climate is conducive to human life, the cultivation of various crops and transport work.

== Geography ==
Chkalovske hromada is located in the central part of t]he Kharkiv Oblast. The terrain is flat, being located in the forest steppe zone of Ukraine. The area is rich in minerals and natural gas, which is extracted. The geology consists of clays, sandstone, and limestone, which are used as building materials. Bricks are manufactured in Lebiazhe. The two most important rivers are the Siverskyi Donets and the Burluk. Within the hromrada can be found streams, ponds, wetlands and groundwater.

== Demographics ==
Chkalovske settlement hromada consists of 15 villages and 2 towns, and a total population of 12,307:

type of settlement	name	population in 2016
village	Bazaliivka	609
village	Ivanivka	1008
village	Mykhalivka	187
village	Petrivske	64
village	Studenok	18
village	Korobchyne	3092
village	Osykovyi Hai	102
village	Lebiazhe	1534
village	Mykolaivka	28
village	Pushkarne	38
rural settlement	Tahanka	9
village	Yurchenkove	364
village	Prolisne	4188
village	Mykolaivka	76
village	Nova Hnylytsia	472
village	Havrylivka	327
village	Doslidne	191

As of 2016 the population density is 47 inhabitants per square kilometre (120/sq mi). Prior to the Russo-Ukrainian war the population growth was due to the migration of people from towns and cities into the countryside.

Location	Area / km^{2}	Population	Population density / inhabitants/km^{2}
Chkalovske hromada	261.1	12, 307	47
Chuhuiv Raion	1148.61	46800	47
Kharkiv Oblast	31415	2775000	87

== Association of citizens and mass media ==
On the territory of Chkalovske hromada the public organization "Chkalovs'ke" "My community" (EDRPOU (National State Registry of Ukrainian Enterprises and Organizations) code 40266500) is registered and functions actively. The number of members consists of 160 people, 60% of the members are women. It represents the interests of all groups of the local population, including vulnerable (especially women, children, pensioners). There operates a village asset (an organized but not registered group of local residents aged from 18 to 70 years) on the territory of Chkalovs'ke amalgamated hromada. The village also takes very active part in the life of society and solving problematic issues. Thanks to a friendly and organized cooperation between this group and Chkalovs'ke rural council in 2015-2016 Chkalovske amalgamated hromada was created, also the vital issues were solved. There operates the veterans organization on the territory of Chkalovs'ke amalgamated hromada. The council consists of 11 members, who are the representatives of all settlements of the amalgamated hromada. In most communities of initiative veterans groups (6 units) are created. This organization is associated with the veterans club "Hope", which has been working for more than 10 years and organizing the reunion for local veterans. There are about 2 625 veterans in the amalgamated hromada. Chkalovske rural council co-finances the maintenance of the Chuhuiv district broadcasting company "Slobozhanka" and the social-informative newspaper "Herald of Chuhuivshchyna" of Chuhuiv Raion.

== Education ==
There are six secondary schools in the Chkalovske hromada: Chkalovs'ke Secondary School, Ivanivka Secondary School, Korobochkyne Secondary School, Lebiazhe Secondary School, Nova Hnylytsia Secondary School, and Bazalivka Secondary School.

== Medicine ==
The public institution of health protection "Chuhuiv district center for primary health care" of Chuhuiv district council of the Kharkiv region provides the population with medical services on the territory of Chkalovs'ke amalgamated hromada. In the villages of Chkalovske amalgamated hromada there are its structural units, namely: • Chkalovske health post of family practice • Ivanivka health post of family practice • Korobochkyne health post of family practice • Lebiazhe health post of family practice • Feldsher-midwife station village Bazaliivka • Feldsher-midwife station village Yurchenkove • Feldsher-midwife station village Nova Hnylytsia • Feldsher-midwife station village Mykolaivka • Feldsher-midwife station village Mykhailivka • Feldsher-midwife station village Stepove There are four family doctors of general practice who serve 11349 residents of Chkalovske Amalgamated Hromada. In Feldsher-midwife stations of the united community there work paramedics and nurses who serve 958 people.

== Culture ==
There are five houses of culture in Chkalovs'ke hromada.

== Infrastructure and economy ==
Two highways pass through Chkalovske hromada, Chuhuiv-Milove and Kyiv-Kharkiv-Dovzhanskyi. Most of the roads in the hromada are surfaced. A branch line of Ukraine's railway system passes within the area.

Agriculture is an important part of the economy of the Chkalovske hromada. Slobozhanskyi is the largest producer of pork in the Kharkiv region. Farming and food processing are also important.

== Observatory ==
Kharkiv National University's Chuhuiv Observational Station was founded in 1960 by Mykola Pavlovych Barabashov. Its main work concerns the photometric and spectropolarimetric observations of asteroids.

== Mykhailivka Nature Reserve ==
Entomological reserve of the local value is "Mykhailivskyi". The area is 5,6 hectares. The area is on the South-Western steppe area near the village of Mykhailivka. There grows vegetation of steppe type. There live about 40 types of insects, among which there is the main fertilizer of alfalfa. Entomological reserve of the local value is "Studentok" The area is 4,9 hectares. The land is on the steppe slopes of the beam near the village of Studenok. The area is 4,9 hectares. There grows steppe vegetation. There live about 50 types and groups of beneficial insects, including pollinators of alfalfa.
