= Yevgeny Naumov =

Russian politician

- Евгений Наумов
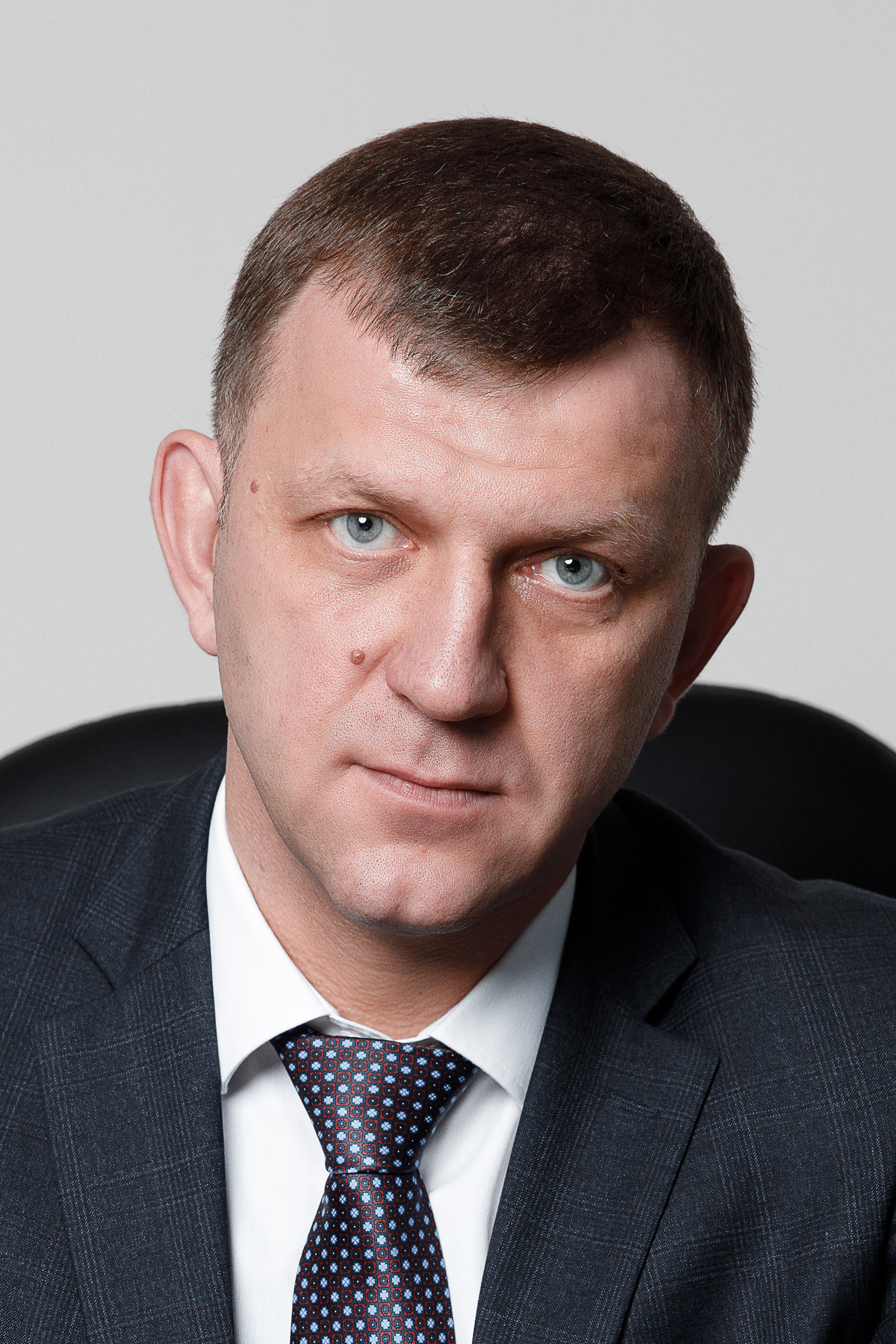

Mayor of Krasnodar
- In office 9 November 2022 – 5 October 2026
- Preceded by: Maksim Slyusaryev (acting)
- Succeeded by: Dmitry Vasilyev (acting)

Vice Governor of Krasnodar Krai
- In office 21 October 2021 – 9 November 2022

Deputy Mayor of Krasnodar
- In office December 2015 – 2017

Personal details
- Born: Yevgeny Mikhailovich Naumov; 27 May 1980 (age 46) Berezovoy, Krasnodar Krai, Russian SFSR, Soviet Union
- Party: United Russia
- Children: 2

Yevgeny Mikhailovich Naumov (Russian: Евгений Михайлович Наумов; born on 27 May 1980) is a Russian politician who served as mayor of Krasnodar from November 9, 2022, until his resignation on October 5, 2026.

== Biography ==
Yevgeny Naumov was born on 27 May 1980 in Berezovoy in Krasnodar Krai.

In 2002, he graduated from the Kuban State Technological University, Faculty of Automotive and Highways, with a degree in engineering management.

Between 2004 and 2007, he was the chief specialist of the finance department of the Krasnodar city administration. He joined the United Russia party in 2006.

From 2007 to 2009, he was the Deputy Head of the Department of Engineering Communications and Roads of the Department of Architecture and Urban Planning of the Krasnodar City Administration.

From 2010 to 2013, he was the Deputy Head of the Housing Affairs Department of the Krasnodar City Administration.

In 2013, he graduated from the Faculty of Law of Kuban State University.

From the same year, until 2014, he was the Head of the Housing Affairs Department of the Krasnodar City Administration.

Since March 2015 - Deputy Director, Head of the Department for Work with Citizens and Organizations "Prikubansky" of the MKU of the Krasnodar City Administration "Krasnodar City Multifunctional Center for the Provision of State and Municipal Services".

From December 2015 to 2017, he was the Deputy Head of Krasnodar.

Since 2017 - First Deputy General Director of the State Regional Center for Standardization, Metrology and Testing in the Krasnodar Krai.

From 2019 to 2020, he had been the First Deputy Minister of Labor and Social Development of Krasnodar Krai.

In October 2020, he became the first deputy head of Krasnodar, responsible for architecture and construction.

On 21 October 2021, Naumov became the Vice-Governor of the Krasnodar Krai.

On 9 November 2022, Naumov became the head of Krasnodar.

On 18 January 2023, he was elected secretary of the Krasnodar local branch of the party.

== Awards ==
- Medals "For Outstanding Contribution to the Development of Kuban" – 1st, 2nd, and 3rd class
- Certificate of Honor from the Election Commission of Krasnodar Krai
- Badge of Honor "Honored Builder of Russia"
- Presidential Commendation of the Russian Federation for active participation in the restoration of the Crimean Bridge

== Personal life ==
He is married, and has two sons. He is trained in Greco-Roman wrestling.
