= Kharkiv (river) =

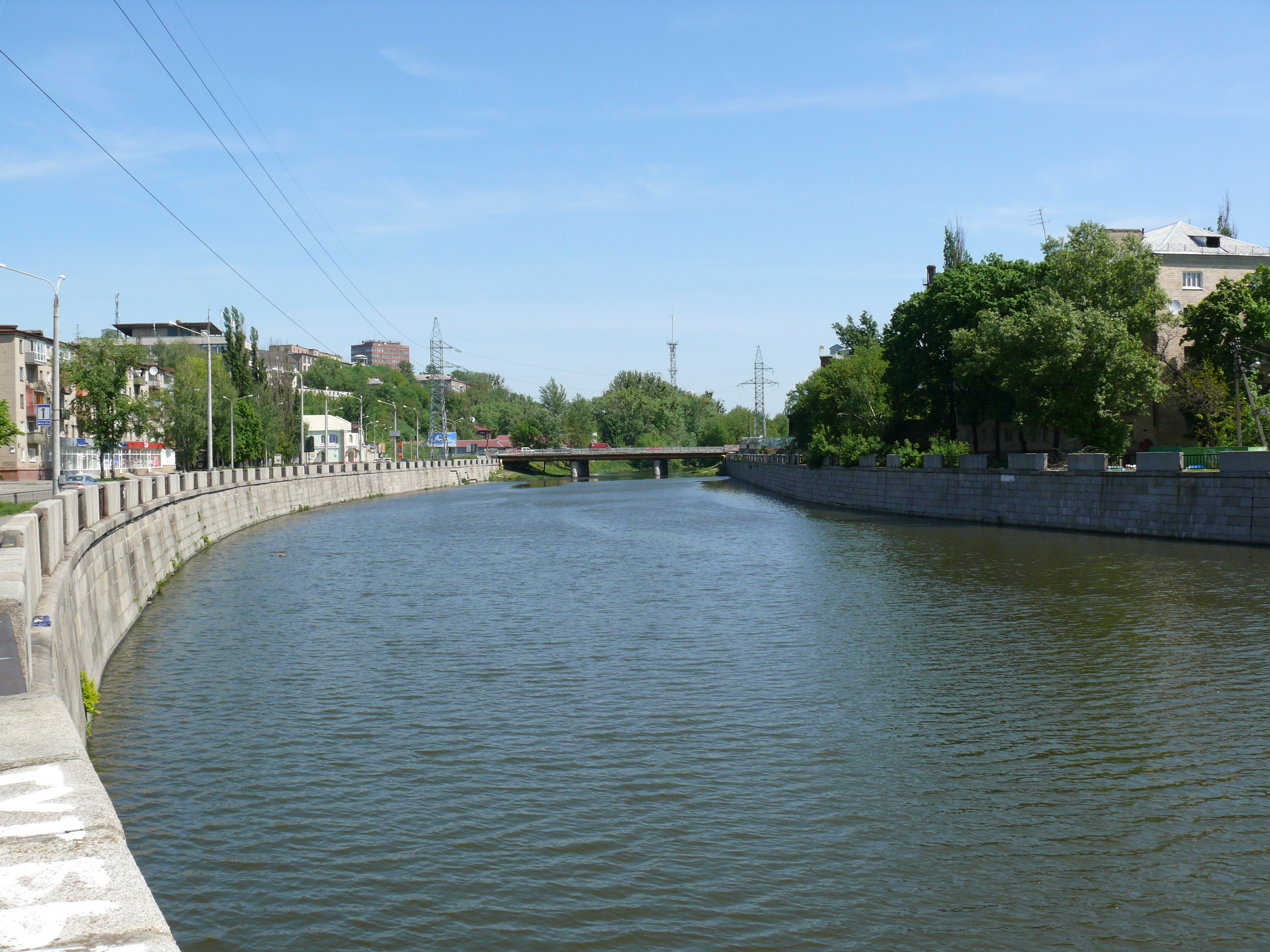

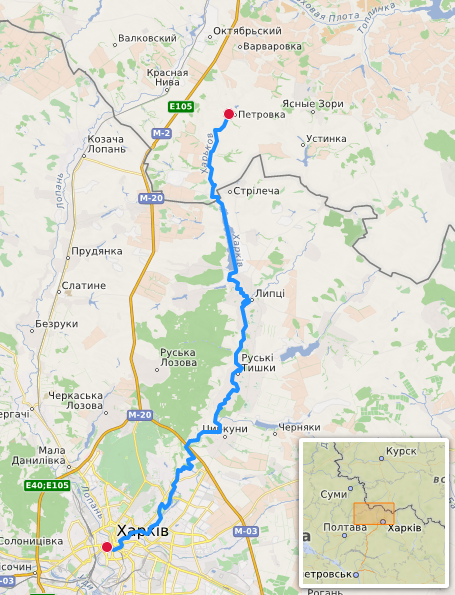

Location
- Country: Russia, Ukraine

Physical characteristics
- Source
  - location: Belgorod Oblast, Russia
  - elevation: 160 m (520 ft)
- Mouth: Lopan
  - location: Kharkiv, Ukraine
  - coordinates: 49.9853°N 36.2239°E
- Length: 71 km (44 mi)
- Basin size: 1,160 km^{2} (450 sq mi)
- Discharge
  - average: 2.62 m^{3}/s (93 cu ft/s)

Basin features
- Progression: Lopan→ Udy→ Donets→ Don→ Sea of Azov

The Kharkiv (Ukrainian: Харків) or Kharkov (Russian: Харьков), is a river in Kharkiv Oblast, Ukraine, a left tributary of the Lopan. It originates from the town of Oktyabrsky in Belgorod Oblast, Russia and it falls into Lopan in the city of Kharkov.

The river Kharkov may have given the city of Kharkov its name. The river is also known as a place for people who enjoy cold-water swimming known as morzhi or "walruses" to swim.

== History ==
In the 17th century, Ukrainian Cossacks led by I. Karkach built a fortified settlement on the plateau surrounded by the Kharkiv River and the Lopan River.

During the Russian invasion of Ukraine, in 2024, a Russian attack on a nearby oil depot on February 9 leaked oil into the river and nearby Nemyshlia river, contaminating it.

== Gallery ==
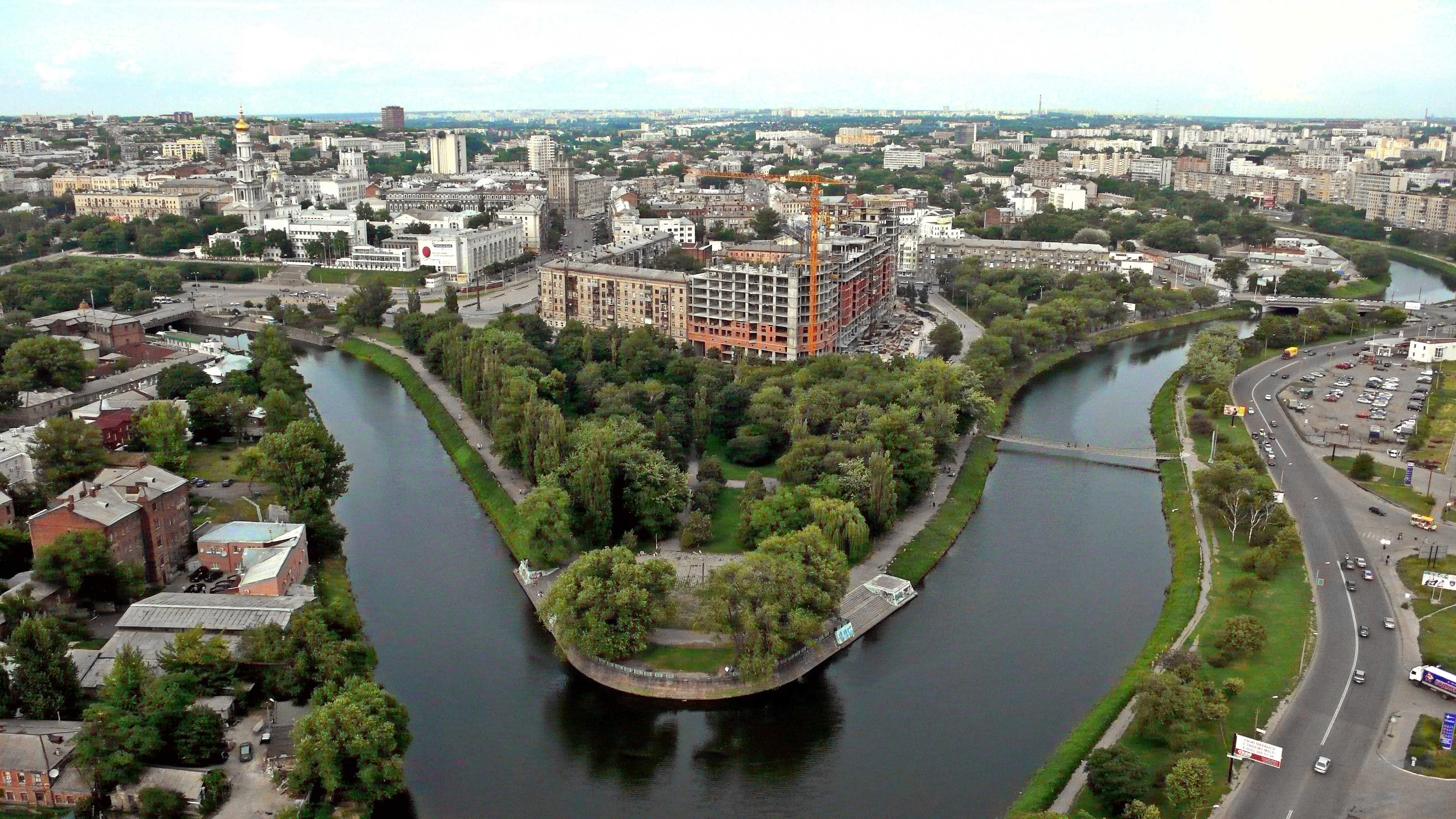
"Lopan Point" place where Kharkiv River drains into Lopan

== See also ==
- MS Lastochka
