= Chuhuiv Raion =

Subdivision of Kharkiv Oblast, Ukraine

Chuhuiv Raion Чугуївський район
- Raion
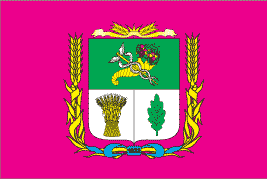
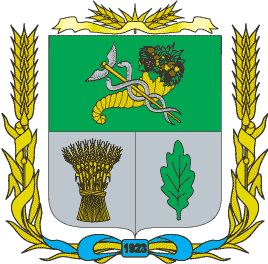
- Flag Coat of arms

- Raion location in Kharkiv Oblast
- Coordinates: 49°46′59.5308″N 36°45′24.858″E
- Country: Ukraine
- Oblast: Kharkiv Oblast
- Admin. center: Chuhuiv
- Subdivisions: 9 hromadas

Area
  - Total: 4,804 km^{2} (1,855 sq mi)

Population (2022)
  - Total: 194,177
  - Density: 40.42/km^{2} (104.7/sq mi)
- Time zone: UTC+2 (EET)
  - Summer (DST): UTC+3 (EEST)
- Website: chuguevrda.gov.ua

Chuhuiv Raion (Ukrainian: Чугуївський район) is a raion (district) in Kharkiv Oblast, Ukraine. Its administrative center is the city of Chuhuiv. Population: 194,177 (2022 estimate).

On 18 July 2020, as part of the administrative reform of Ukraine, the number of raions of Kharkiv Oblast was reduced to seven, and the area of Chuhuiv Raion was significantly expanded. Three abolished raions, Pechenihy, Vovchansk, and Zmiiv Raions, as well as the city of Chuhuiv, which was previously incorporated as a city of oblast significance and did not belong to the raion, were merged into Chuhuiv Raion. The January 2020 estimate of the raion population was 45,362 (2020 est.).

== Subdivisions ==
=== Current ===
After the reform in July 2020, the raion consisted of 9 hromadas:

- Chkalovske settlement hromada with the administration in the rural settlement of Prolisne, retained from Chuhuiv Raion;
- Chuhuiv urban hromada, transferred from Chuhuiv Municipality;
- Malynivka settlement hromada with the administration in the rural settlement of Malynivka, retained from Chuhuiv Raion;
- Novopokrovka settlement hromada with the administration in the rural settlement of Novopokrovka, retained from Chuhuiv Raion;
- Pechenihy settlement hromada with the administration in the rural settlement of Pechenihy, transferred from Pechenihy Raion;
- Slobozhanske urban hromada with the administration in the city of Slobozhanske, transferred from Zmiiv Raion;
- Staryi Saltiv settlement hromada with the administration in the rural settlement of Staryi Saltiv, transferred from Vovchansk Raion;
- Vovchansk urban hromada with the administration in the city of Vovchansk, transferred from Vovchansk Raion;
- Zmiiv urban hromada with the administration in the city of Zmiiv, transferred from Zmiiv Raion.

=== Before 2020 ===
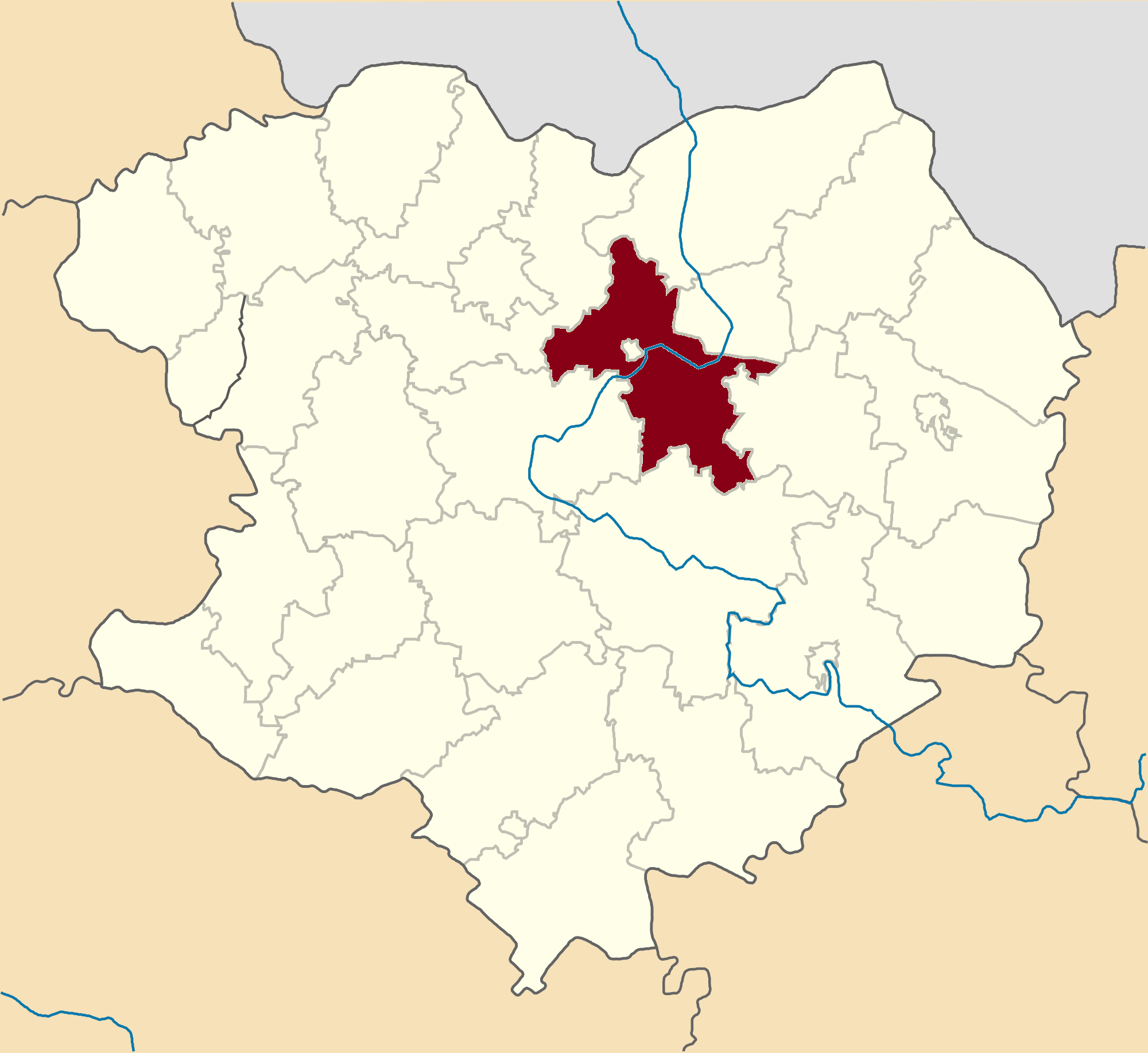
Chuhuiv Raion in Kharkiv Oblast before 2020

Before the 2020 reform, the raion consisted of three hromadas:

- Chkalovske settlement hromada with the administration in Chkalovske;
- Malynivka settlement hromada with the administration in Malynivka;
- Novopokrovka settlement hromada with the administration in Novopokrovka.

== Geography ==
Chuhuiv Raion is located in the central and northern parts of Kharkiv Oblast. The Raion borders Russia (Belgorod Oblast).

The area of Chuhuiv Raion is located on the Central Russian Upland and the Poltava Plain, within the forest steppe natural zone. The relief of Chuhuiv Raion is an undulating plain with ravines and gullies.

The climate of Chuhuiv Raion is temperate continental with cold winters and hot summers. The average annual temperature is +8.7 °C (in January -4.5, in July +22). The average annual rainfall is 520 mm. The highest rainfall occurs in the summer. There are large forest areas (pine and deciduous trees) on the territory of the raion. The soils of the community are chernozems and meadow soils.

The district is located in the Donets Valley. Lake Lyman, which is located in the district, is the largest natural lake in the Kharkiv region. The Pecheneg Reservoir was created in the district on the Donets River, the dam of which was damaged as a result of shelling by Russian troops on September 20, 2022.

Mineral resources of Chuhuiv Raion: loams, clays, sandstones, peat, natural gas.

The raion is crossed by a railway and national highways H26 and European route E-40, which runs from Izyum to Chuguiv.
