= List of villages in Kharkiv Oblast =

Kharkiv Oblast in Ukraine

The following is a list of villages in Ukraine's Kharkiv Oblast, categorised by raion.

== Berestyn Raion ==
- Zemlianky

== Bohodukhiv Raion ==
- Parkhomivka
- Pasichne
- Skoryky
- Udy

== Chuhuiv Raion ==
- Bazaliivka
- Birky
- Borova
- Khotimlya
- Kluhyno-Bashkyrivka
- Kostiantivka
- Lebyazhe
- Mala Seidemynukha
- Molodova
- Rubizhne
- Shestakove
- Velyka Babka
- Zemlianky

== Izium Raion ==
- Bairak
- Bohuslavka
- Borivska-Andriyivka
- Borshchivka
- Brazhkivka
- Chornobaivka
- Donetske
- Dovhenke
- Husarivka, Balakliia hromada
- Husarivka, Barvinkove hromada
- Iziumske
- Nova Husarivka
- Novoplatonivka
- Oskil
- Pisky-Radkivski
- Protopopivka
- Studenok
- Velyka Komshuvakha
- Virnopillya
- Zelenyi Hai

== Kharkiv Raion ==
- Bezruky
- Cherkaski Tyshky
- Hoptivka
- Lyptsi
- Mala Rohan
- Male Vesele
- Peremoha
- Ruska Lozova
- Ruski Tyshky
- Ternova
- Tsyrkuny
- Vilkhivka
- Zatyshne
- Zavody

== Lozova Raion ==
- Lozivske
- Zelenyi Hai

== Kupiansk Raion ==
- Hrianykivka
- Kurylivka
- Petropavlivka
- Tavilzhanka
- Zatyshne
- Zelenyi Hai
