= Zatyshne =

Zatyshne (Ukrainian: Затишне) may refer to several places in Ukraine:

== Crimea ==
- Zatyshne, Crimea, village in Lenine Raion

== Dnipropetrovsk Oblast ==
- Zatyshne, Kamianske Raion, Dnipropetrovsk Oblast, village in Kamianske Raion
- Zatyshne, Novomoskovsk Raion, Dnipropetrovsk Oblast, village in Novomoskovsk Raion
- Zatyshne, Pavlohrad Raion, Dnipropetrovsk Oblast, village in Pavlohrad Raion

== Donetsk Oblast ==
- Zatyshne, Donetsk Oblast, village in Volnovakha Raion

== Kharkiv Oblast ==
- Zatyshne, Kharkiv Raion, Kharkiv Oblast, village in Kharkiv Raion
- Zatyshne, Kupiansk Raion, Kharkiv Oblast, village in Kupiansk Raion

== Kyiv Oblast ==
- Zatyshne, Kyiv Oblast, village in Boryspil Raion

== Luhansk Oblast ==
- Zatyshne, Luhansk Oblast, village in Sievierodonetsk Raion

== Ternopil Oblast ==
- Zatyshne, Ternopil Oblast, village in Chortkiv Raion

== Vinnytsia Oblast ==
- Zatyshne, Vinnytsia Oblast, village in Tulchyn Raion

== Zakarpattia Oblast ==
- Zatyshne, Zakarpattia Oblast, village in Berehove Raion
