= Zemlianky =

Zemlianky (Ukrainian: Землянки) may refer to several places in Ukraine:

- Zemlianky, Donetsk Oblast
- Zemlianky, Chuhuiv Raion, Kharkiv Oblast
- Zemlianky, Berestyn Raion, Kharkiv Oblast
- Zemlianky, Poltava Oblast
