= Skoryky =

Skoryky may refer to:

- Skoryky, Kharkiv Oblast, village in Ukraine
- Skoryky, Ternopil Oblast, village in Ukraine
