= Pasichne, Kharkiv Oblast =

Rural locality in Kharkiv Oblast, Ukraine

Pasichne Пасічне
- Village
- Interactive map of Pasichne
- Coordinates: 49.93°N 35.74°E
- Country: Ukraine
- Oblast: Kharkiv
- District: Bohodukhiv
- Founded: 1695

Population (2001)
  - Total: 62
- Time zone: UTC+2 (EET)
- Postal code: 63039
- KOATUU code: 6321288505

Pasichne (Ukrainian: Пасічне, Russian: Пасечное) is a dairy-farming village of 62 people (as of 2001) in the northeastern Ukraine. It is part of the Sharovsky village council, in Bohodukhiv Raion of Kharkiv Oblast. The М-03 (E 40) highway runs nearby. Pasichne belongs to Valky urban hromada, one of the hromadas of Ukraine.

The village was founded in 1695 under the name Prach (Ukrainian: Прачі). The name was changed to Pasichne in 1960. The village has a school and a recreation center.

Until 18 July 2020, Pasichne belonged to Valky Raion. The raion was abolished in July 2020 as part of the administrative reform of Ukraine, which reduced the number of raions of Kharkiv Oblast to seven. The area of Valky Raion was merged into Bohodukhiv Raion.

== Sources ==
- Pasichne at Supreme Council of Ukraine website
- Pasichne at Mbendi travel information website
