= Rubizhne, Chuhuiv Raion =

Village in Kharkiv Oblast, Ukraine

Rubizhne Рубіжне
- Village
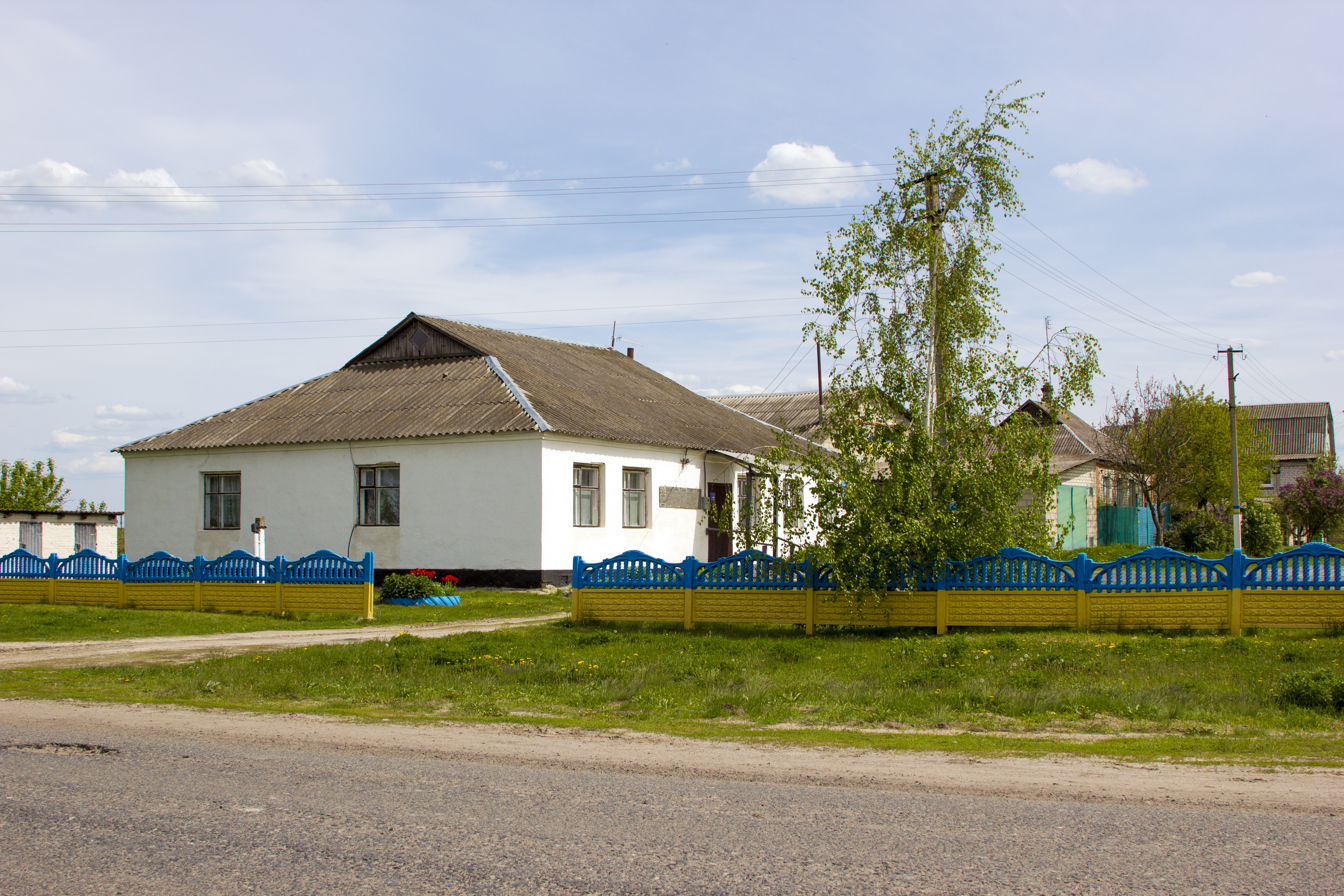
- Rubizhne village council
- Interactive map of Rubizhne
- Location of Rubizhne within Ukraine Rubizhne (Ukraine)
- Coordinates: 50.166667°N 36.821111°E
- Country: Ukraine
- Oblast: Kharkiv Oblast
- District: Chuhuiv Raion
- Hromada: Vovchansk urban hromada
- Founded: 1795

Area
  - Total: 0.227 km^{2} (0.088 sq mi)
- Elevation: 117 m (384 ft)

Population (2001 census)
  - Total: 1,652
  - Estimate (April 2024): 60
  - Density: 7,280/km^{2} (18,800/sq mi)
- Time zone: UTC+2 (EET)
  - Summer (DST): UTC+3 (EEST)
- Postal code: 6253
- Area code: +380 5741

Rubizhne (Ukrainian: Рубіжне; Russian: Рубежное) is a village in Chuhuiv Raion (district) in Kharkiv Oblast of eastern Ukraine, at about 47.1 kilometres (29.3 mi) northeast by east from the centre of Kharkiv city, on the right bank of the Siverskyi Donets river.

== Geography ==
Rubizhne is located on the right bank of the Pechenehy Reservoir, at the confluence of the Rubezhnaya ravine with the Seversky Donets River. The village has a bridge connecting it to the nearby village of Verkhnii Saltiv, which is located 1 kilometre (0.62 mi) downstream. The area surrounding Rubizhne is mostly covered by a large oak forest.

The distance from the center of the Vovchansk urban hromada, where Rubizhne is part of, is 18 kilometres (11 mi). The total area of the village is 2.15 km^{2}.

== Etymology ==
The name "Rubizhne" originates from the border wall that once separated the village from its neighboring settlement. This wall served as a boundary between the two communities and became the source of the village's name, as "Rubizhne" is derived from the Slavic word "rubizh" meaning "border".

== History ==
Rubizhne's history dates back to its founding in 1692 under the Tsardom of Russia. The area had fallen under Russian control as a result of the Khmelnytsky Uprising, with the Cossack Hetmanate swearing fealty to the Russian tsar.

One of the village's notable residents was Count Hendrykov Ivan Simonovych, who lived there between 1765 and 1778. He was a general-in-chief and played a significant role in organizing the election of Hetman Kyrylo Rozumovskyi in Glukhov in 1750. The Church of the Assumption of the Virgin was built in 1769 with funds provided by Count Hendrykov and his wife Kateryna Sergiivna, who were later buried in the church.

In the summer and autumn of 1861, there were peasant riots in the village following the abolition of serfdom in the Russian Empire. A German company named "Rothermund and Weisse" built a sugar factory in the village in 1850, which employed about 300 people. By 1864, the village had a population of 738 people and was home to an Orthodox church, a beet sugar factory, and a brick factory.

During the Revolution of 1905-1907, workers' strikes took place in the village, resulting in the looting of the landlord's estate. The number of residents increased to 1,478 by 1914.

After the February Revolution, the Council of Workers' Deputies was established at the beet-sugar factory, and the Council of Peasant Deputies also emerged in the village. In December 1917, the village was occupied by the Reds. The village suffered as a result of the genocide of the Ukrainian people carried out by the USSR government in 1932–1933, with 528 established victims in Rubizhne and surrounding villages.

From 2 October 1941, to 9 August 1943, the village was under German occupation, and a partisan unit named after Shchors operated in the forests near the village. During the Second World War, 51 natives of Rubizhne were awarded orders and medals of the Soviet Union.

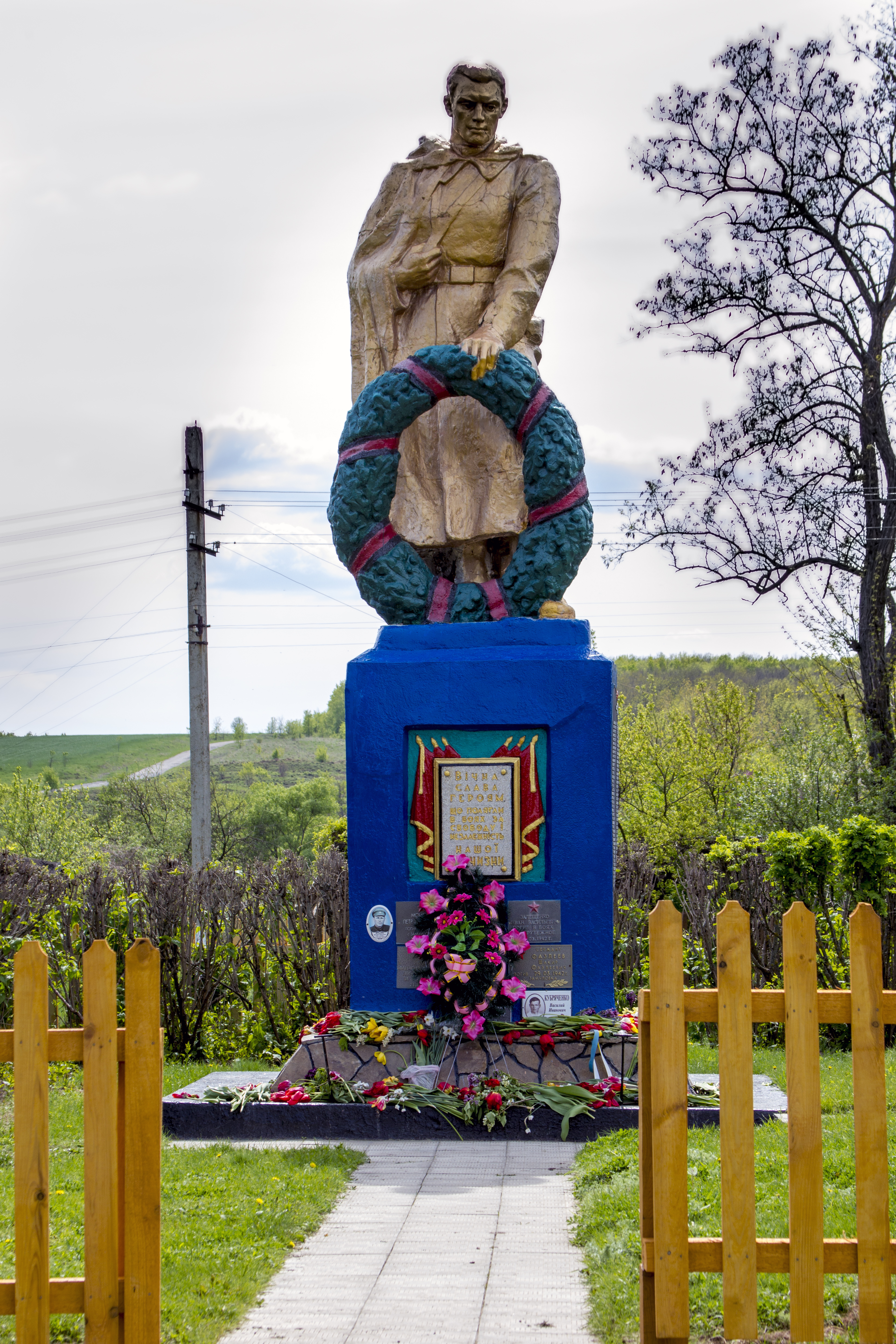
Mass grave of those killed in World War II.

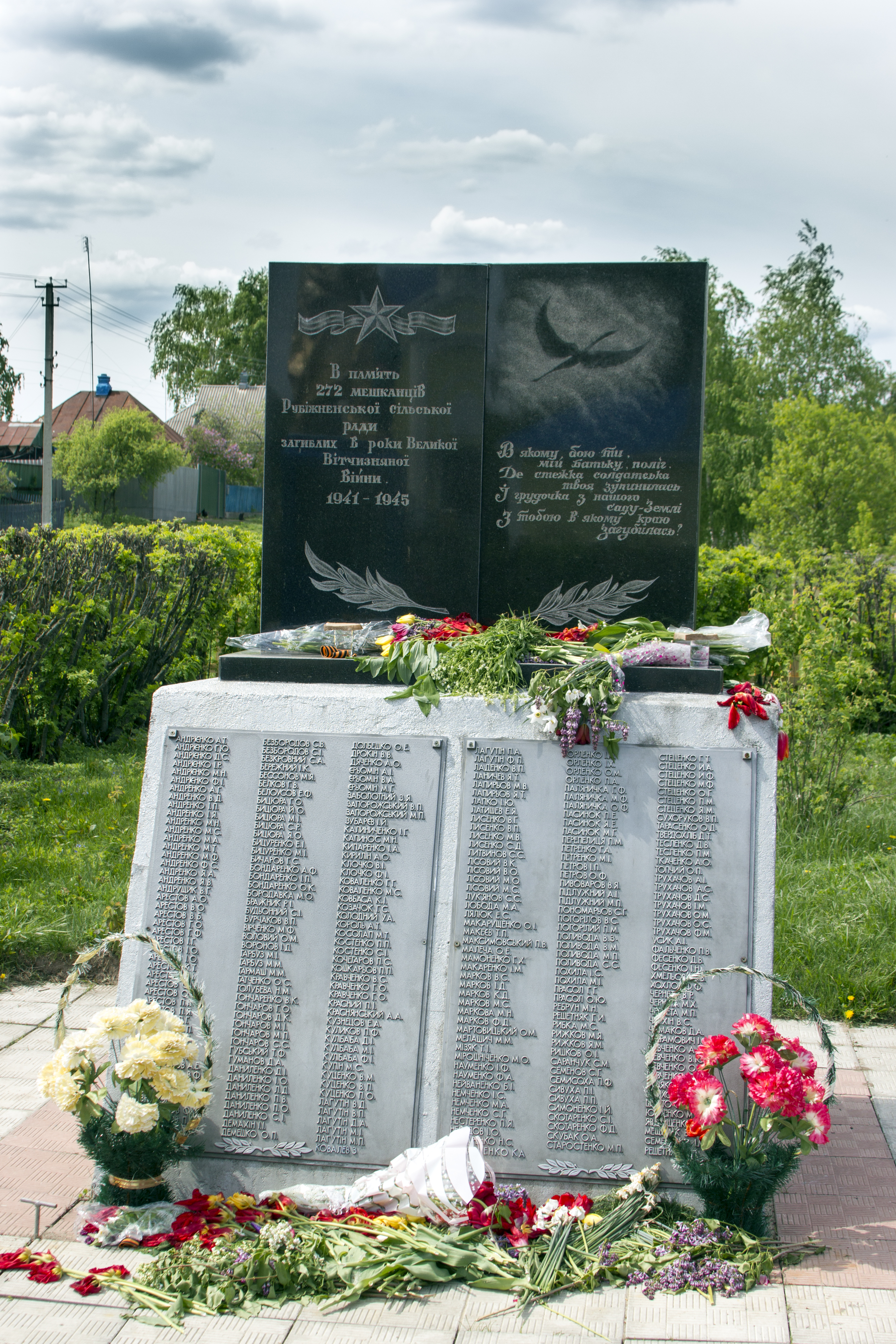
A monument in honor of fellow villagers who died in the wars.

In June 2020, Rubizhne became part of the Vovchansk Raion and later in July 2020, it became part of the Chuguyiv district following administrative-territorial reforms. The village was occupied in the first days of the Russian invasion of Ukraine in 2022, but was later liberated on 9 May 2022.

=== Russo-Ukrainian War ===
During the initial eastern campaign of the 2022 Russian invasion of Ukraine, Rubizhne was occupied by Russia during the first days the conflict. The village was retaken by Ukrainian forces later that year during the 2022 Kharkiv counteroffensive. Russian forces began combat operations in the area of Rubizhne once again on 10 May 2024 during their Kharkiv offensive.

== Gallery ==
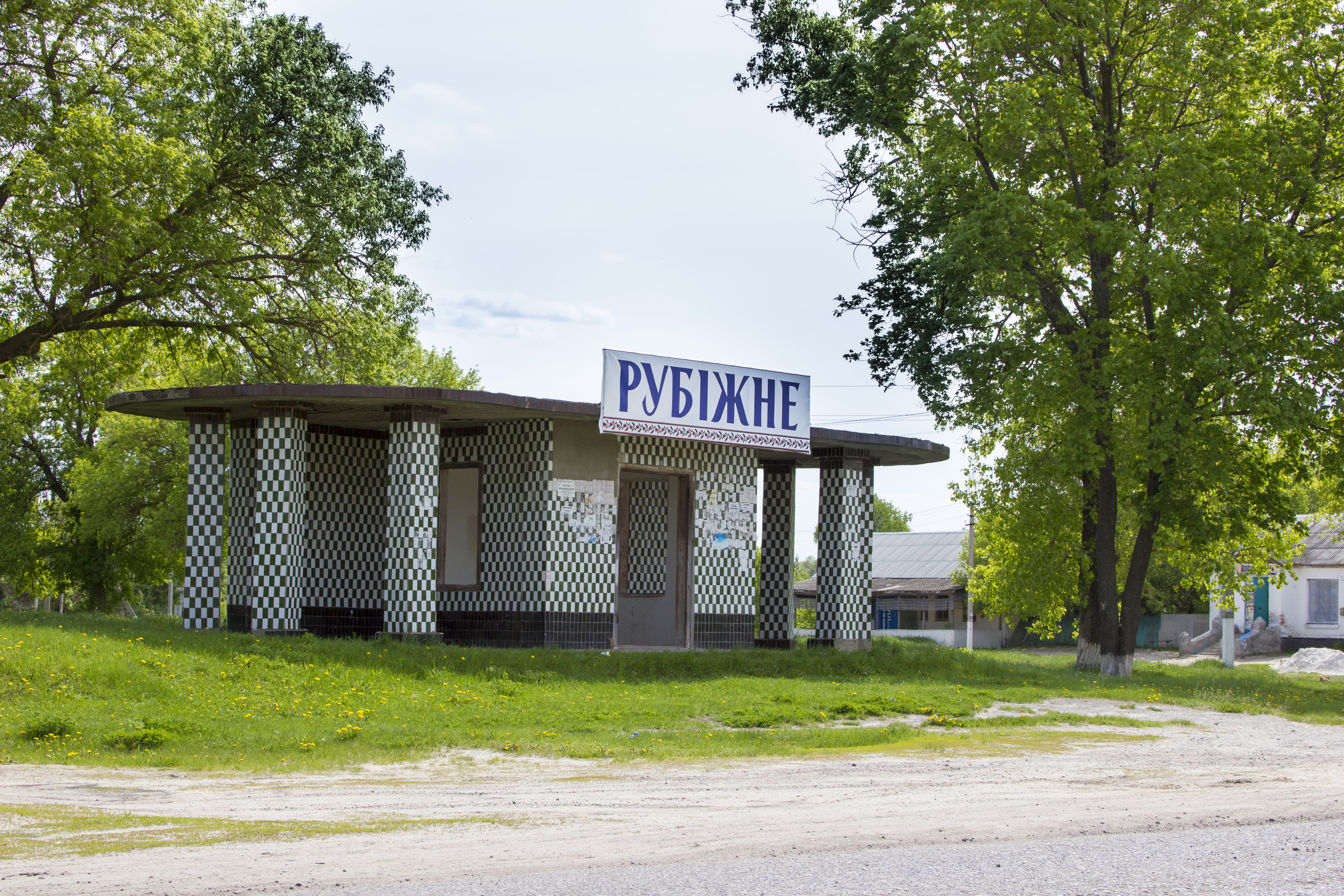
Bus stop

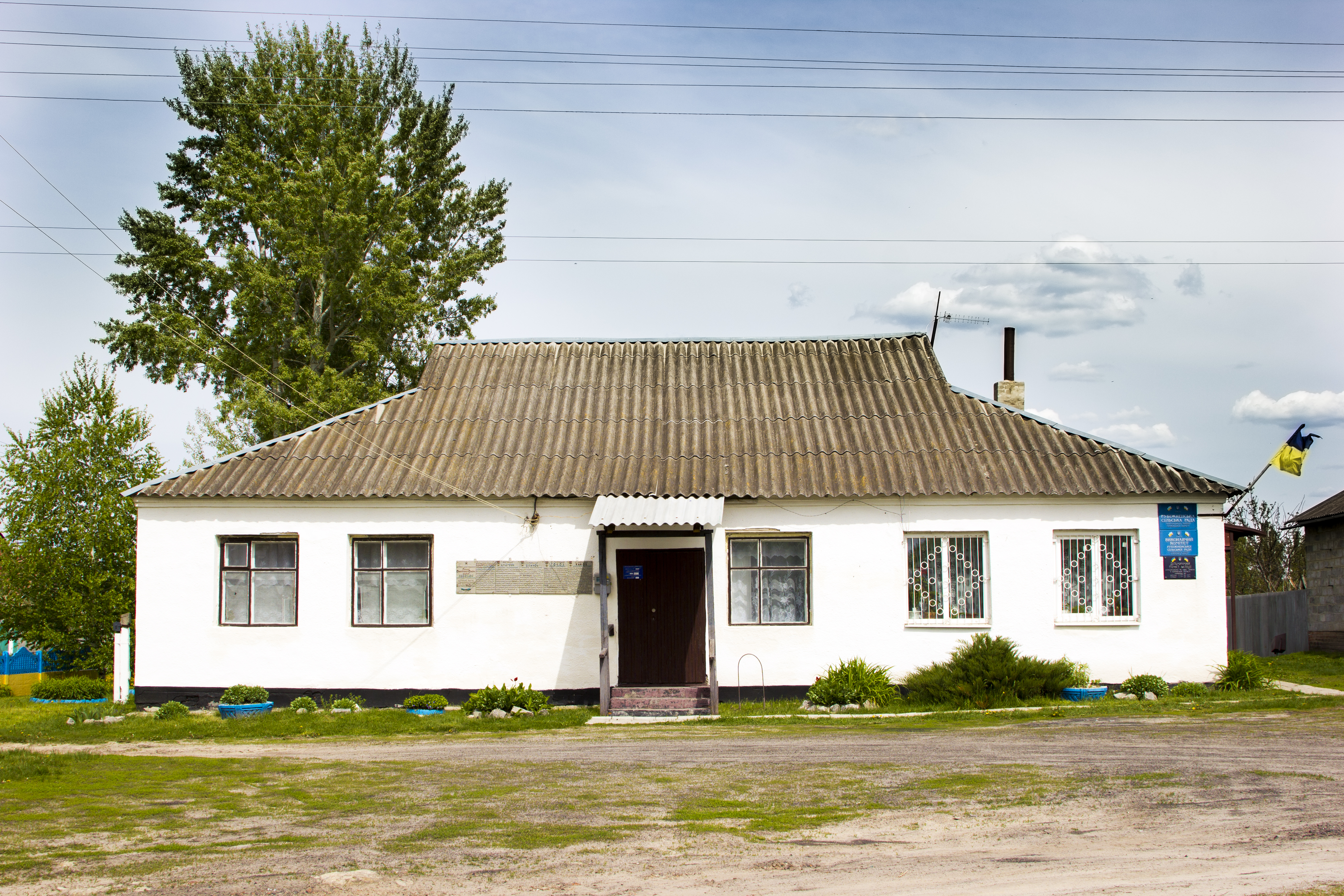
Premises of the village council

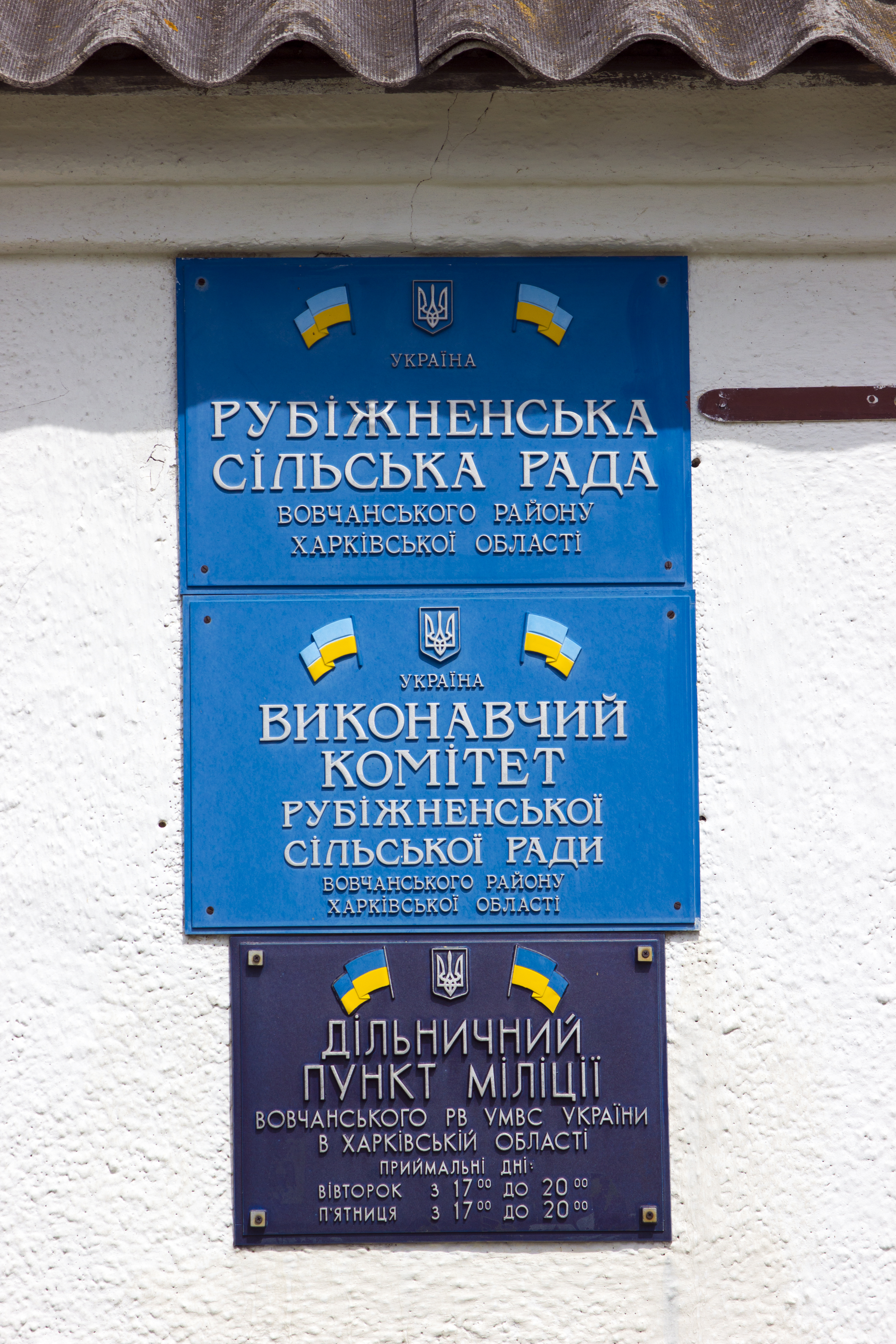
Premises of the village council

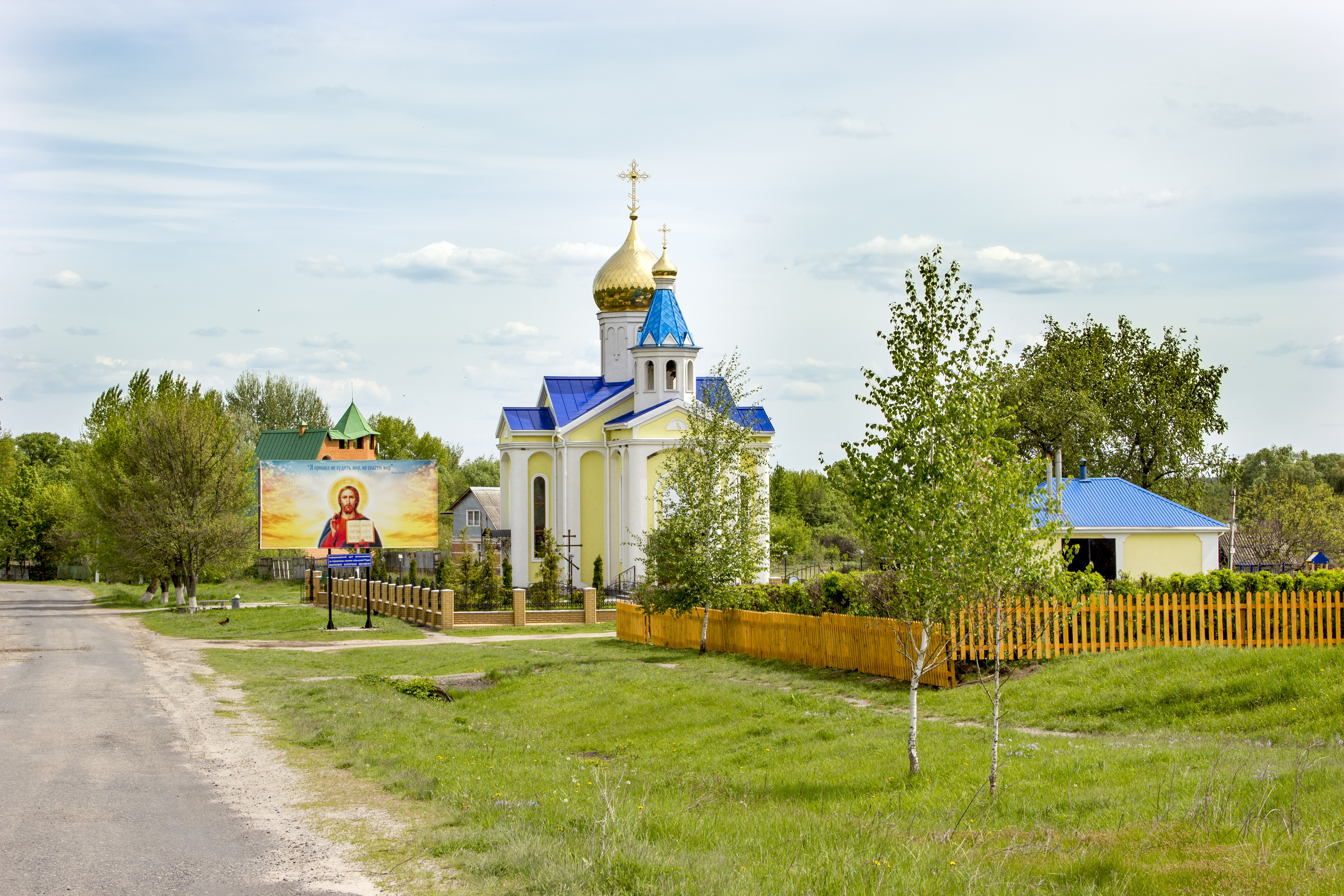
Temple of the Dormition of the Holy Mother of God

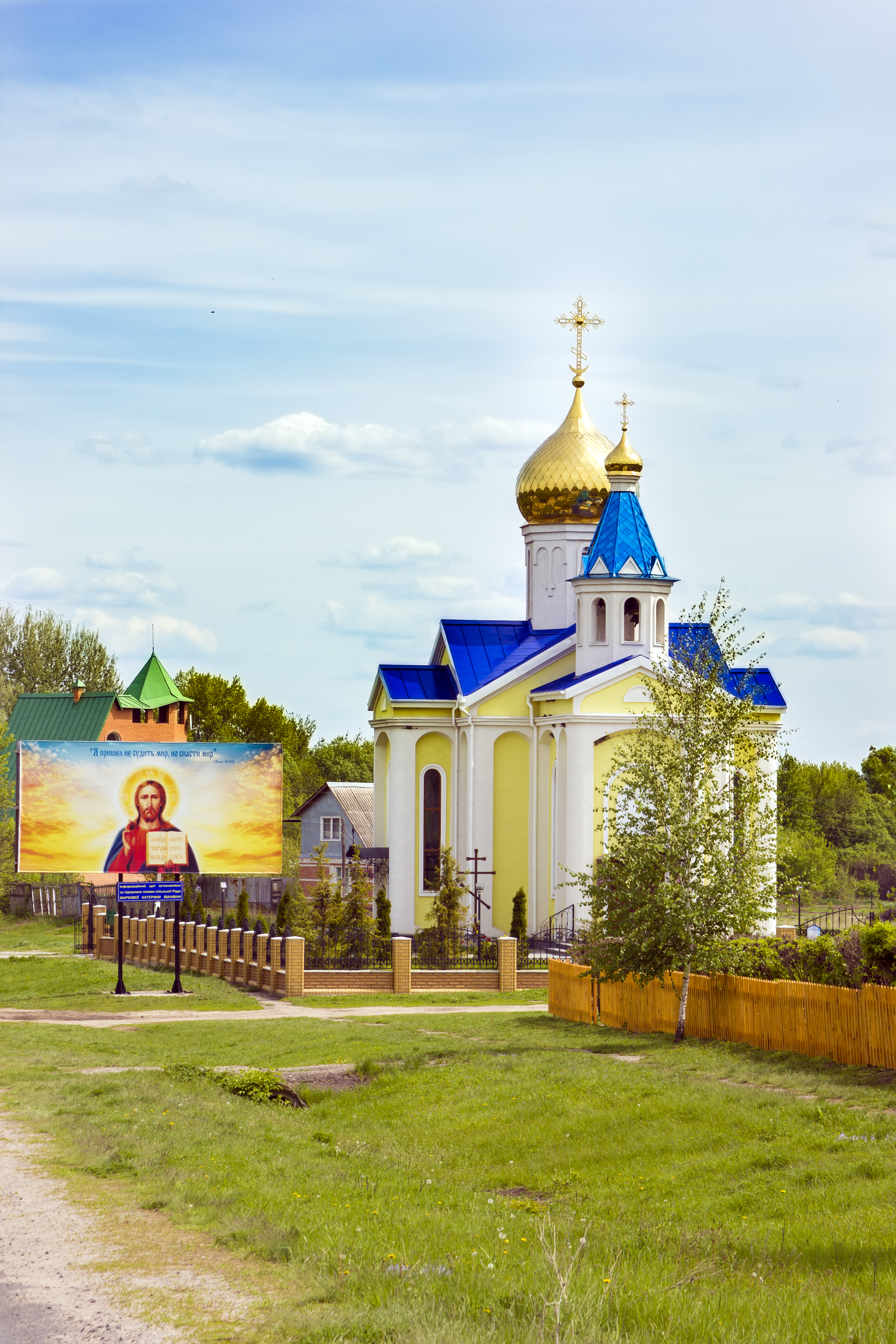
Temple of the Dormition of the Holy Mother of God

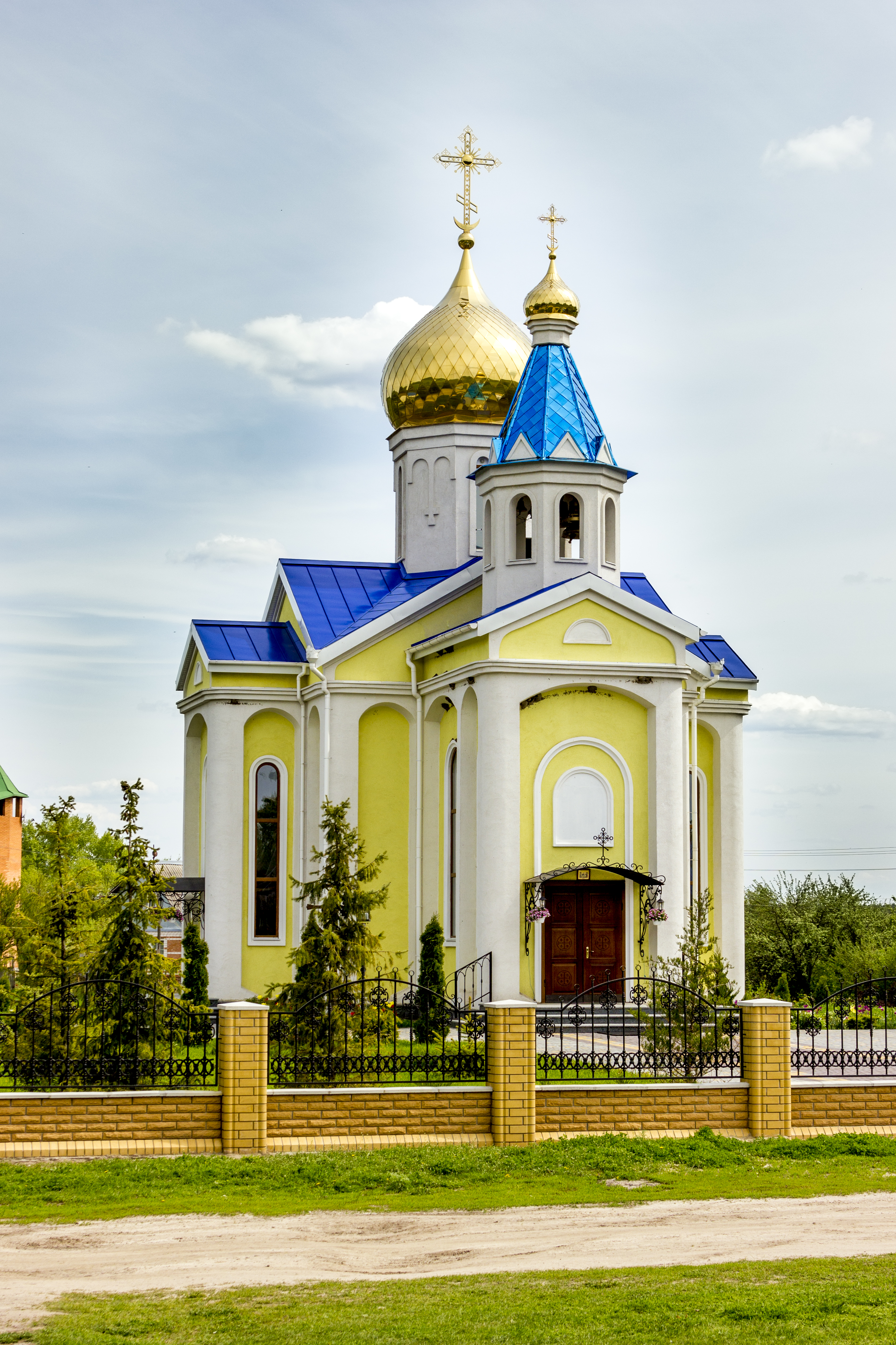
Temple of the Dormition of the Holy Mother of God

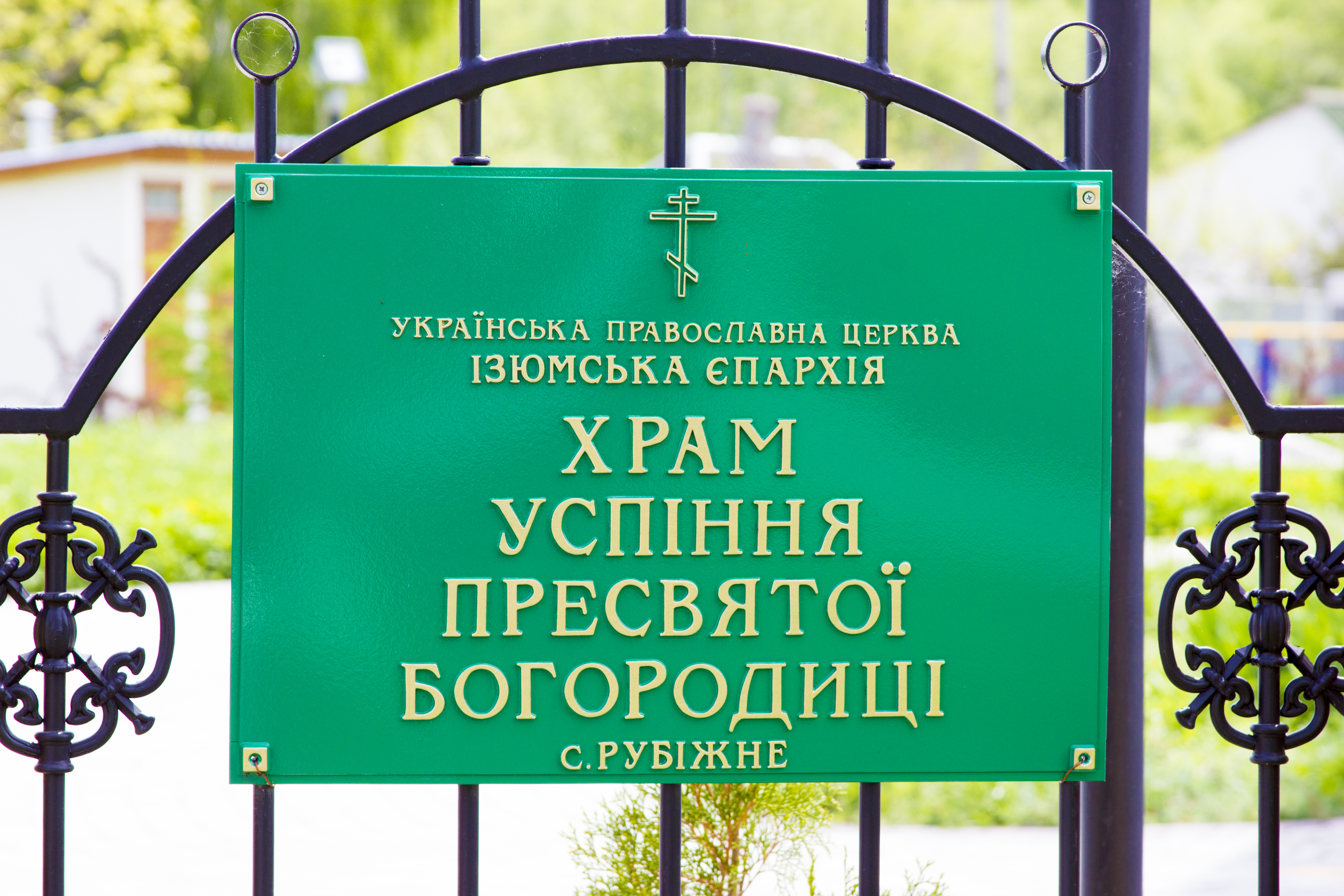
Temple of the Dormition of the Holy Mother of God

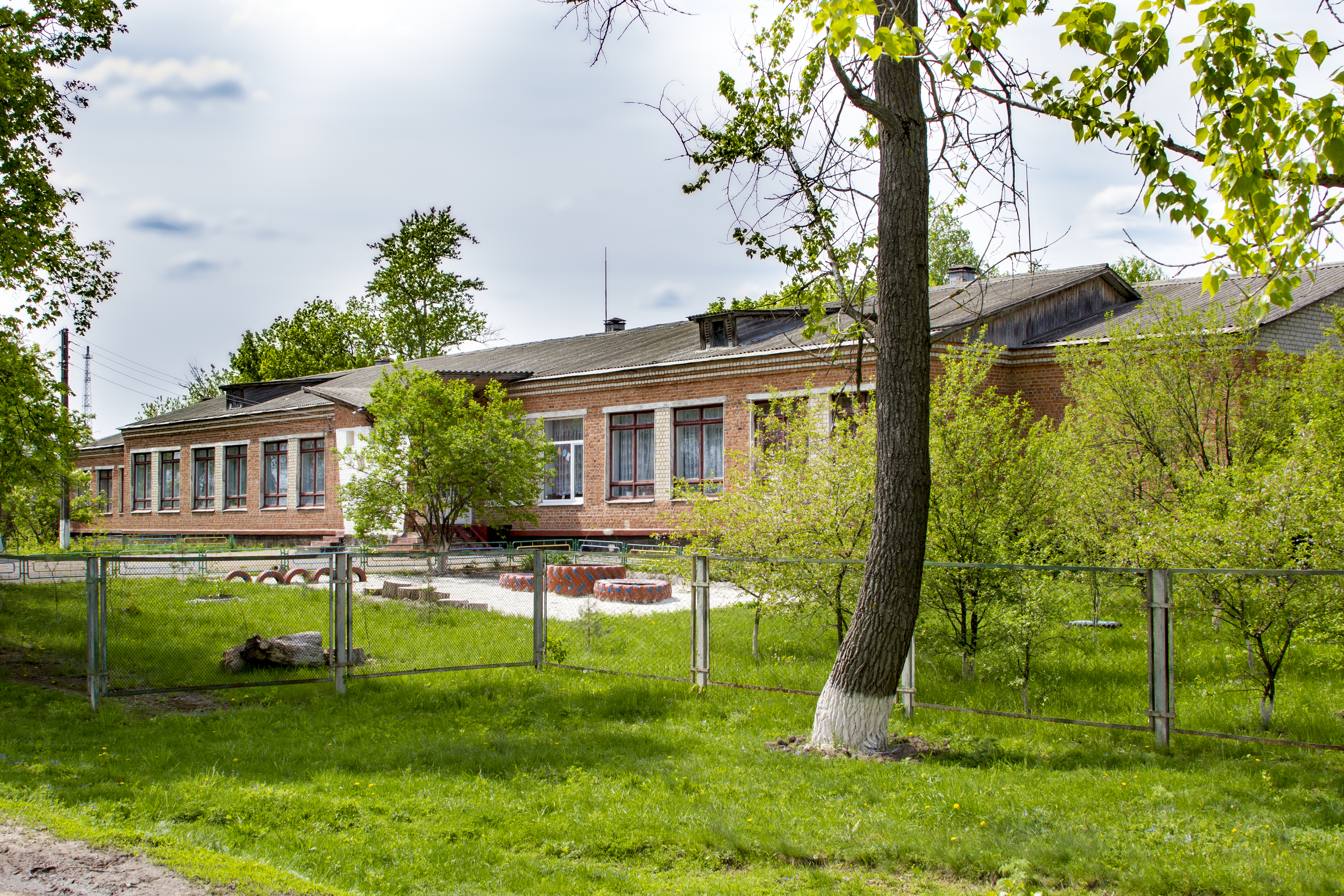
Rubizhne secondary school

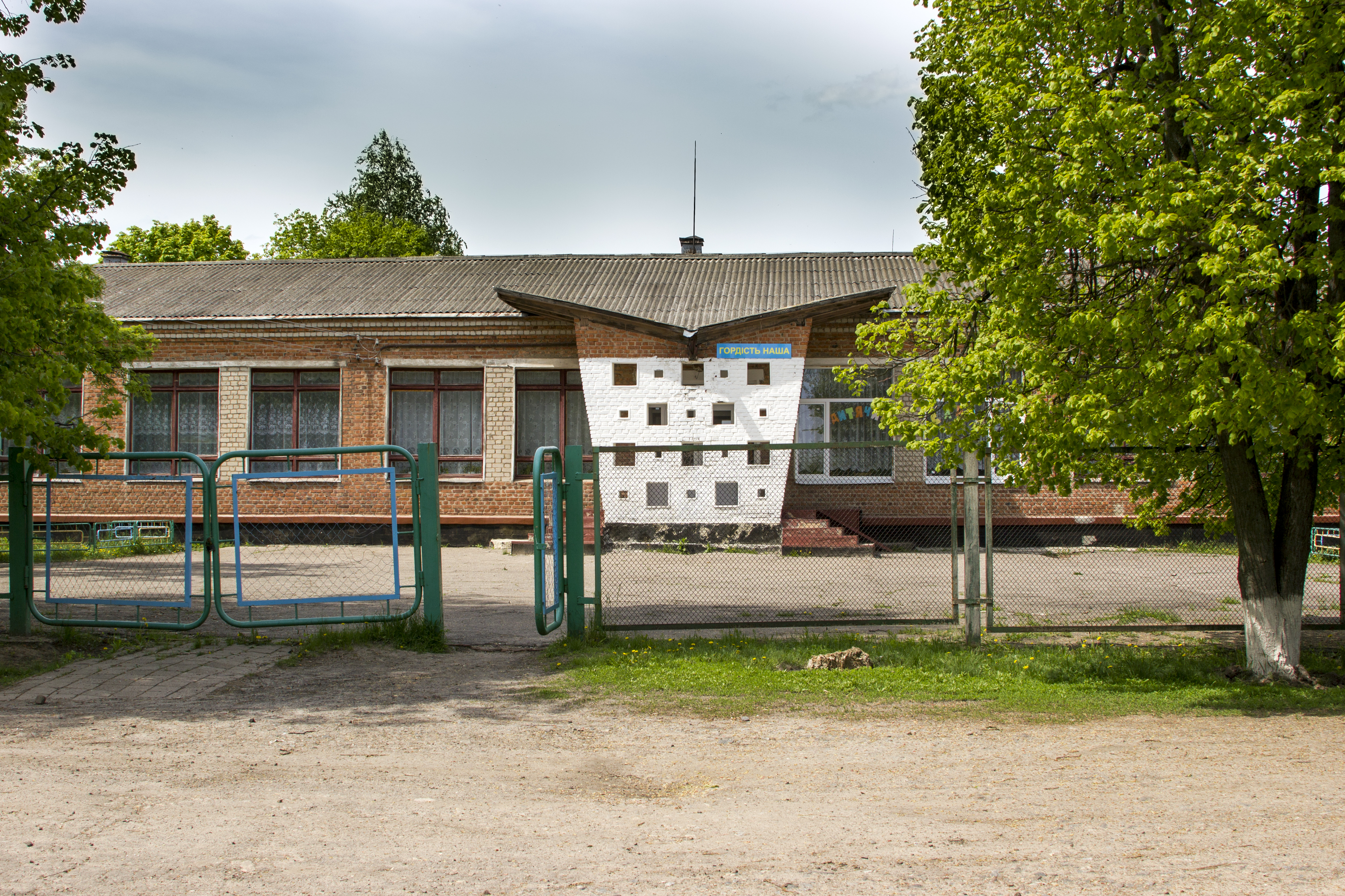
Rubizhne secondary school

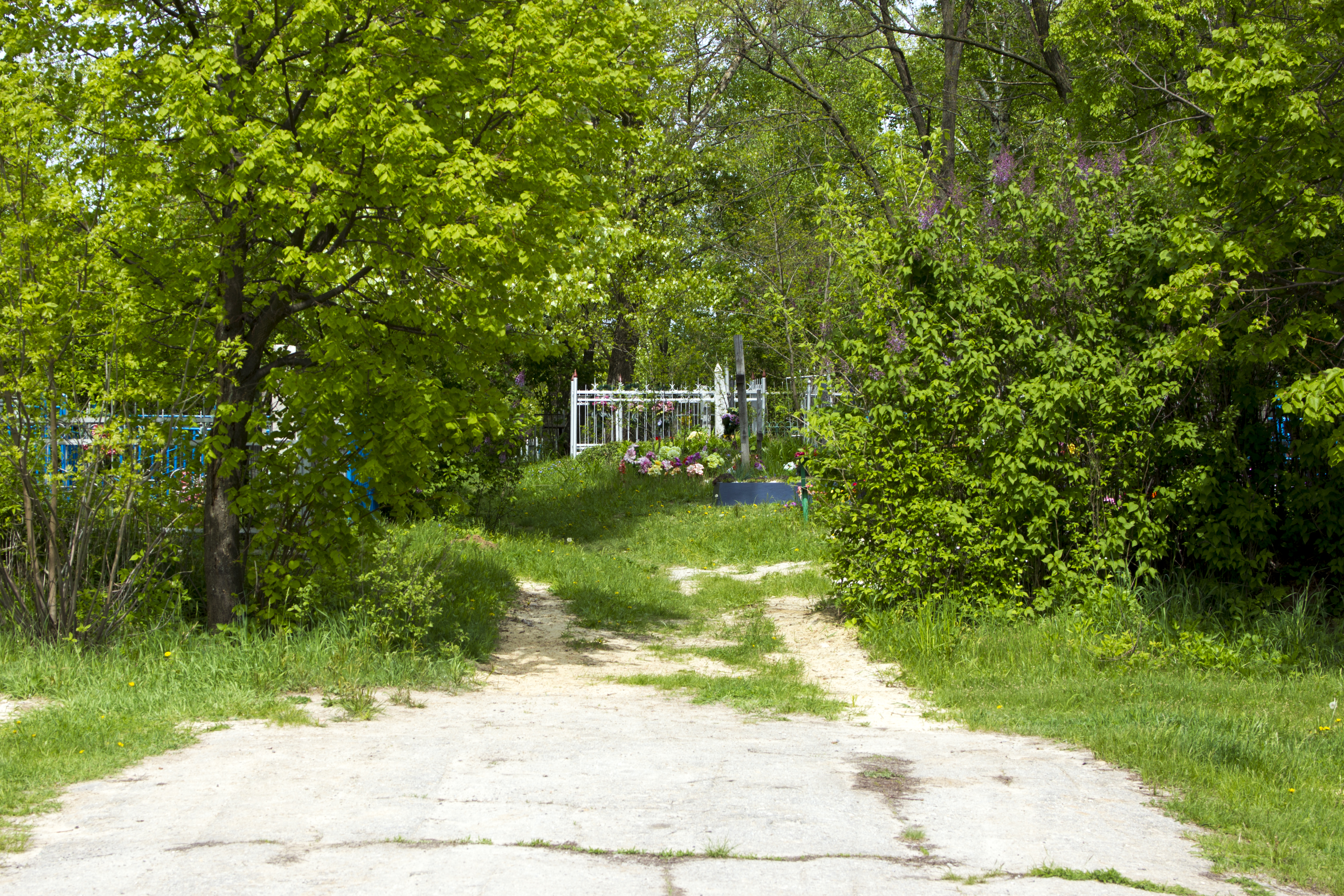
Entrance to the village cemetery

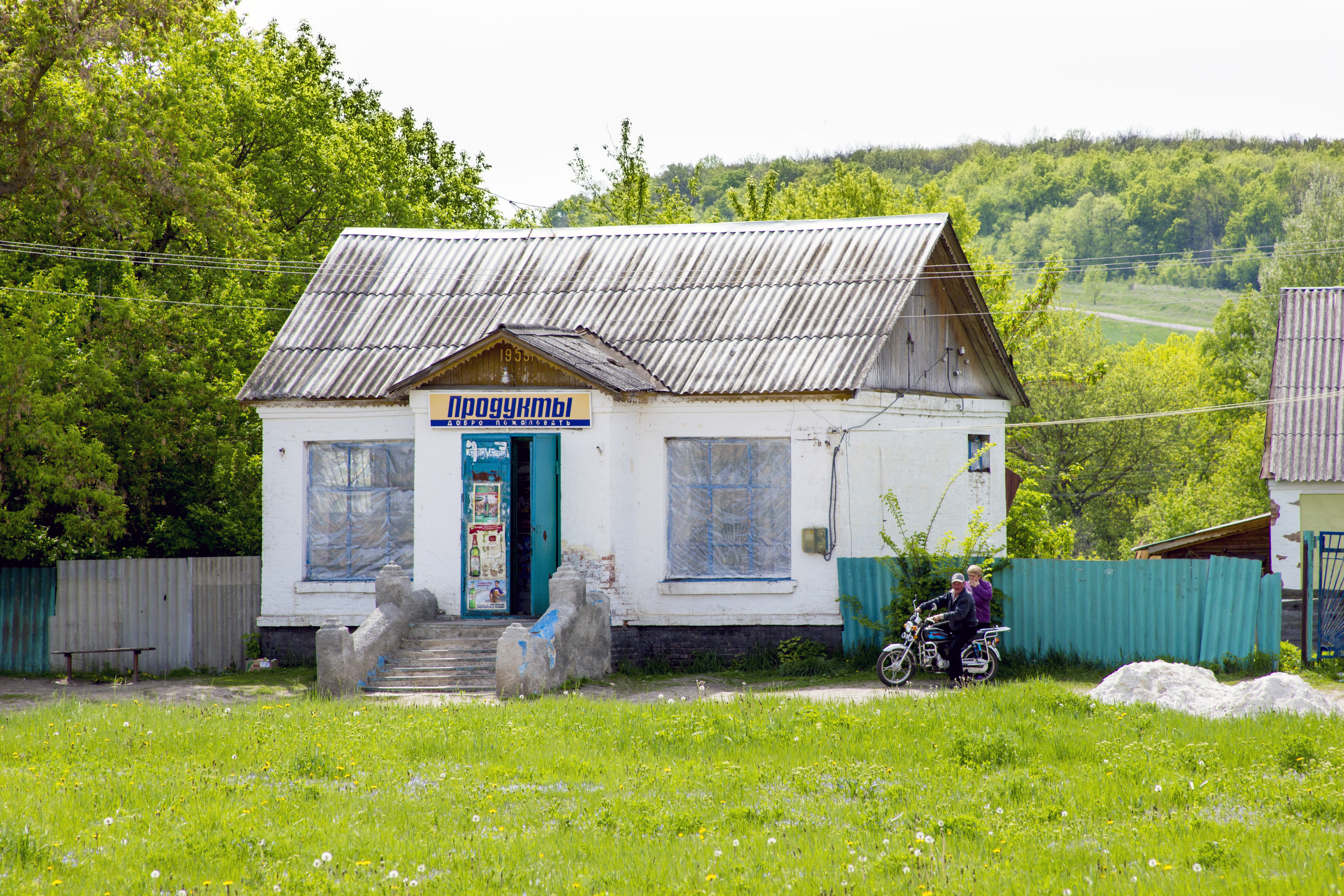
Grocery store

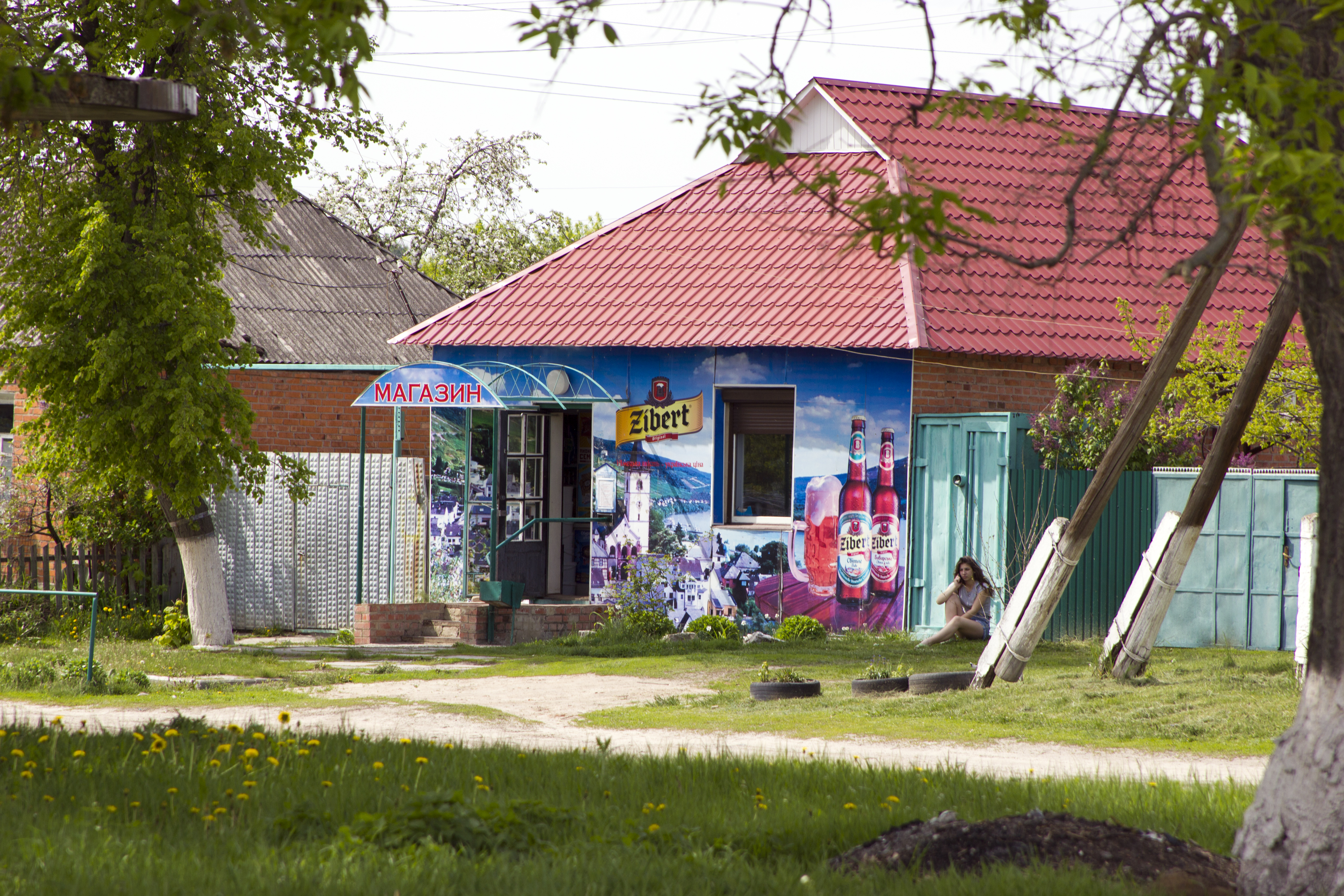
Shop

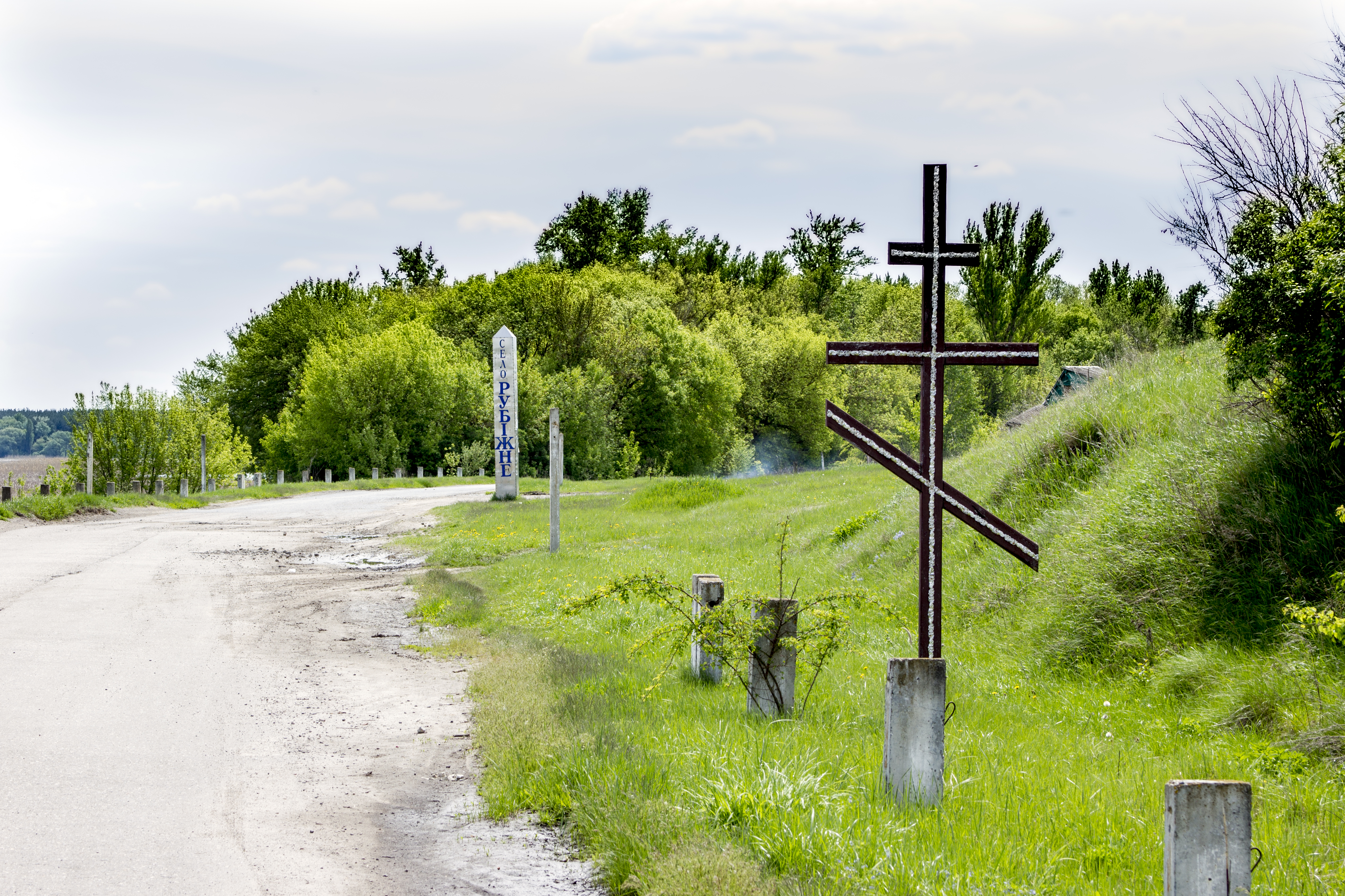
Orthodox cross

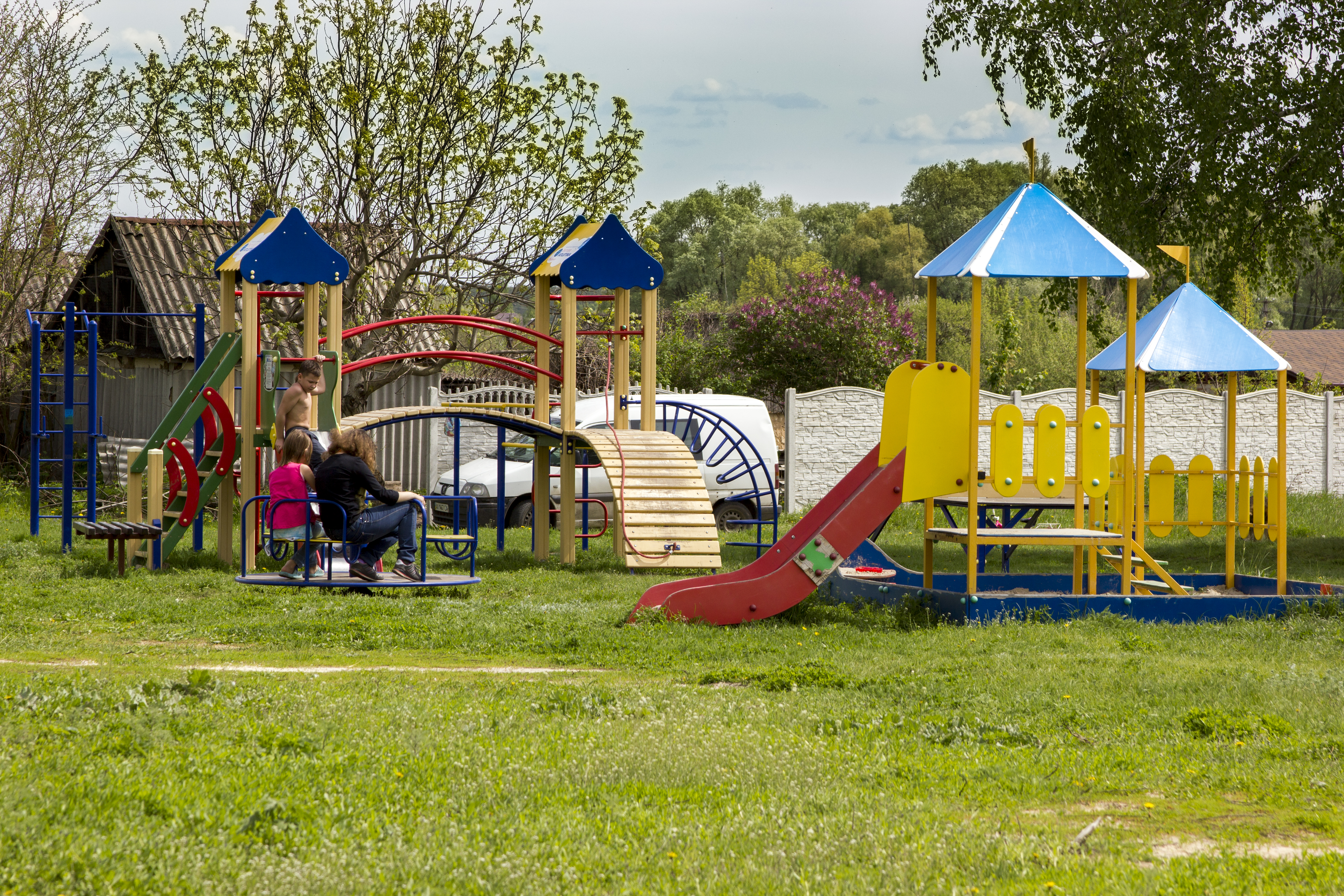
Children's Playground

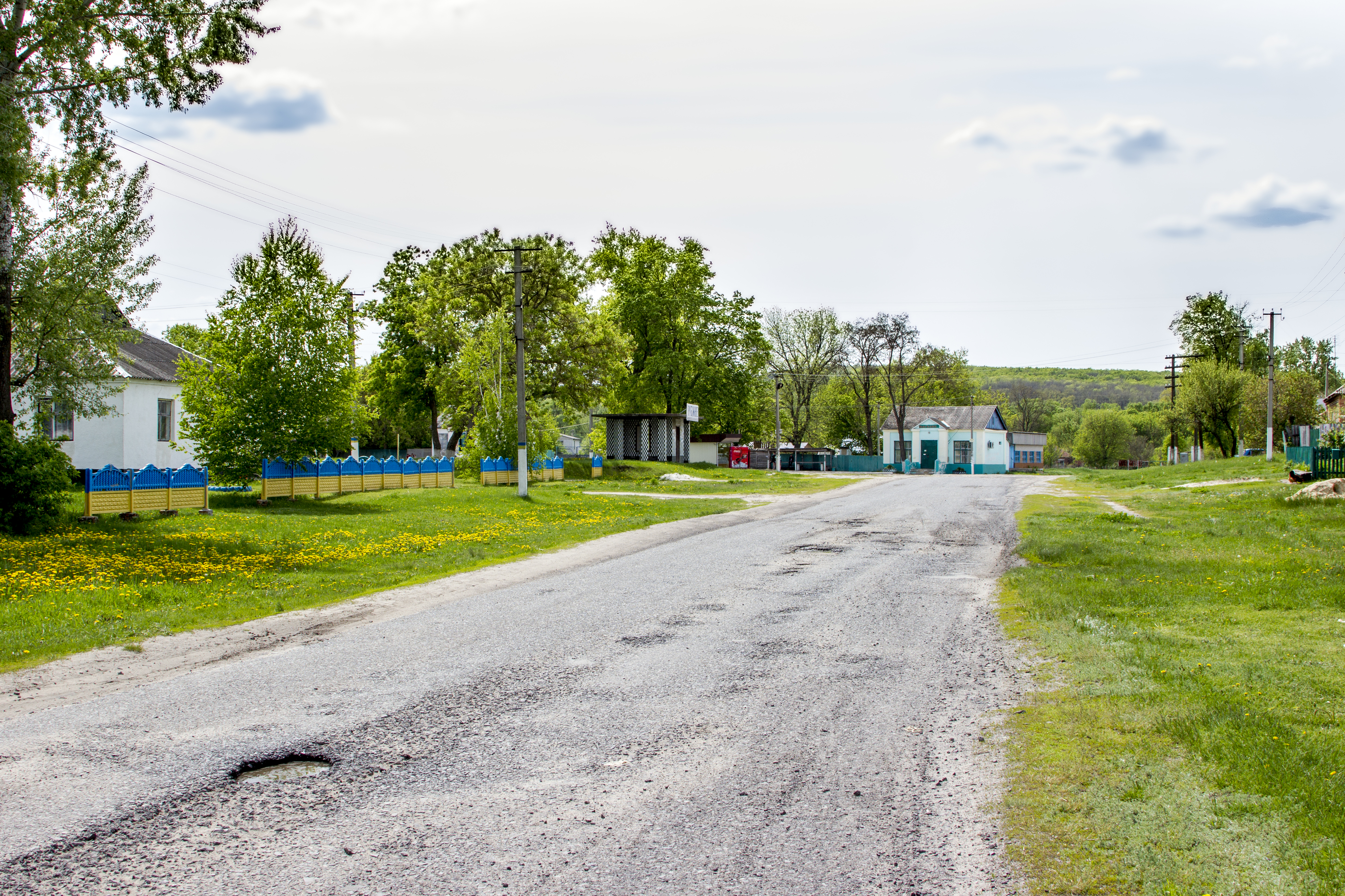
The central part of the village

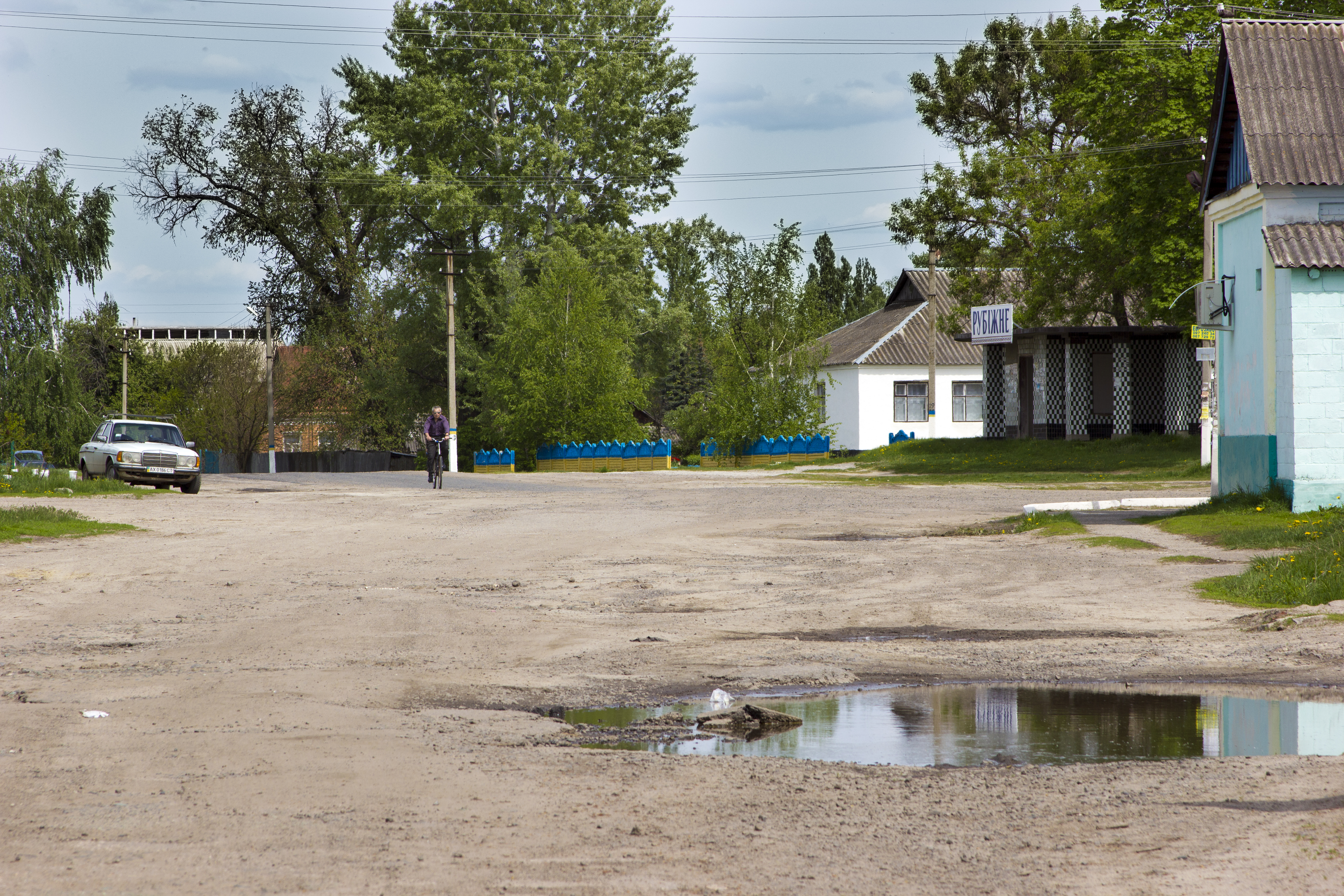
The central part of the village

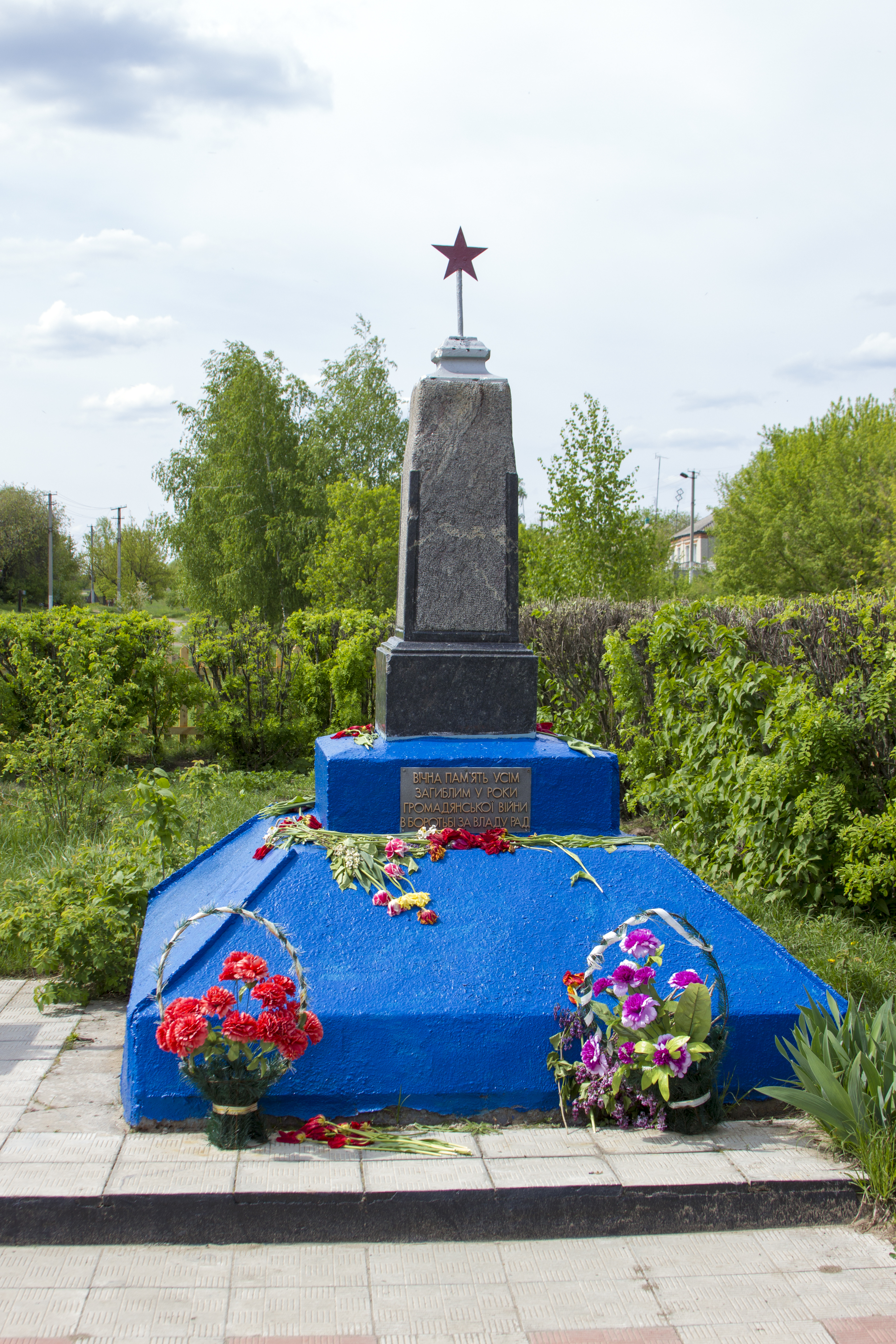
Mass grave

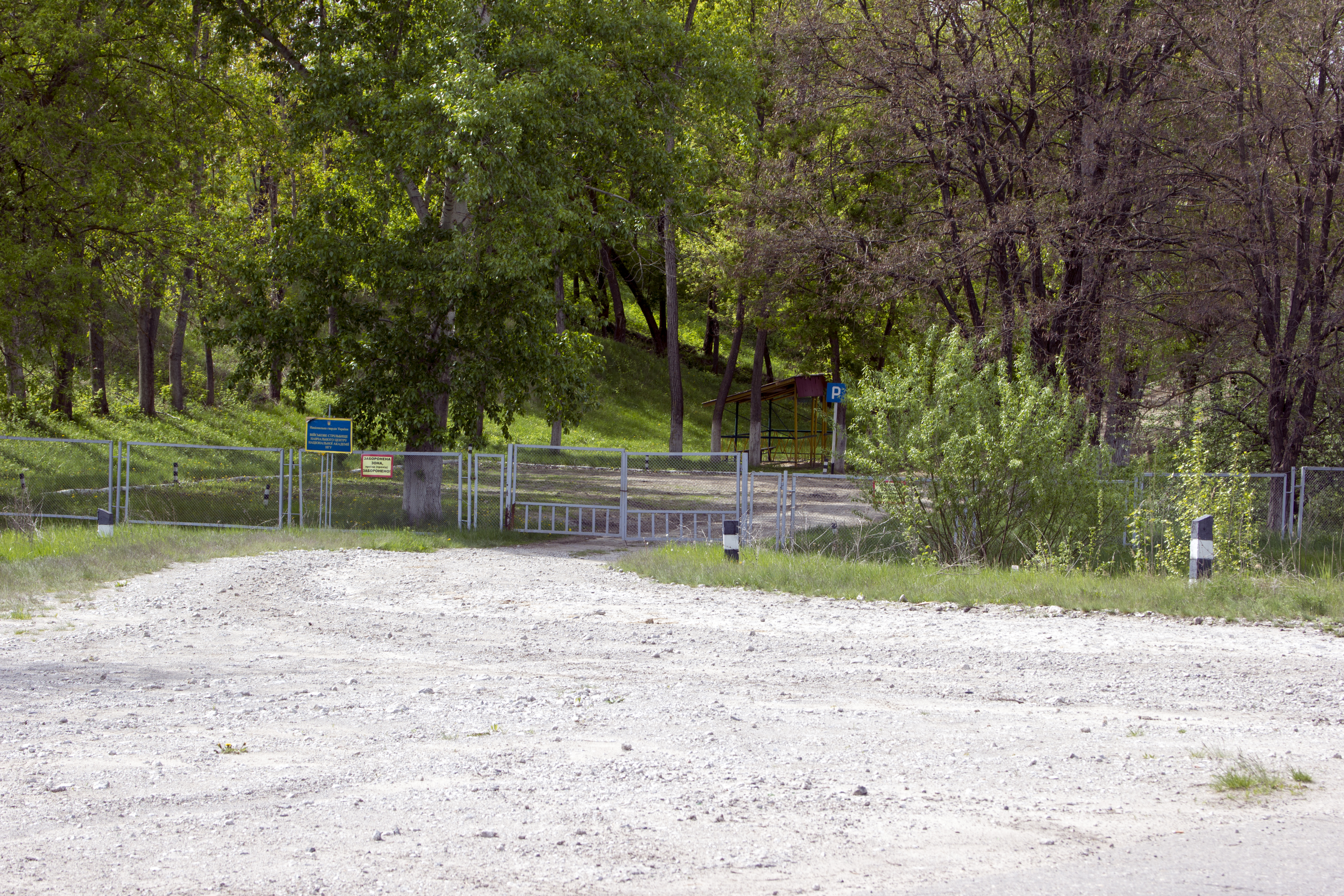
Shooting range of the National Guard of Ukraine

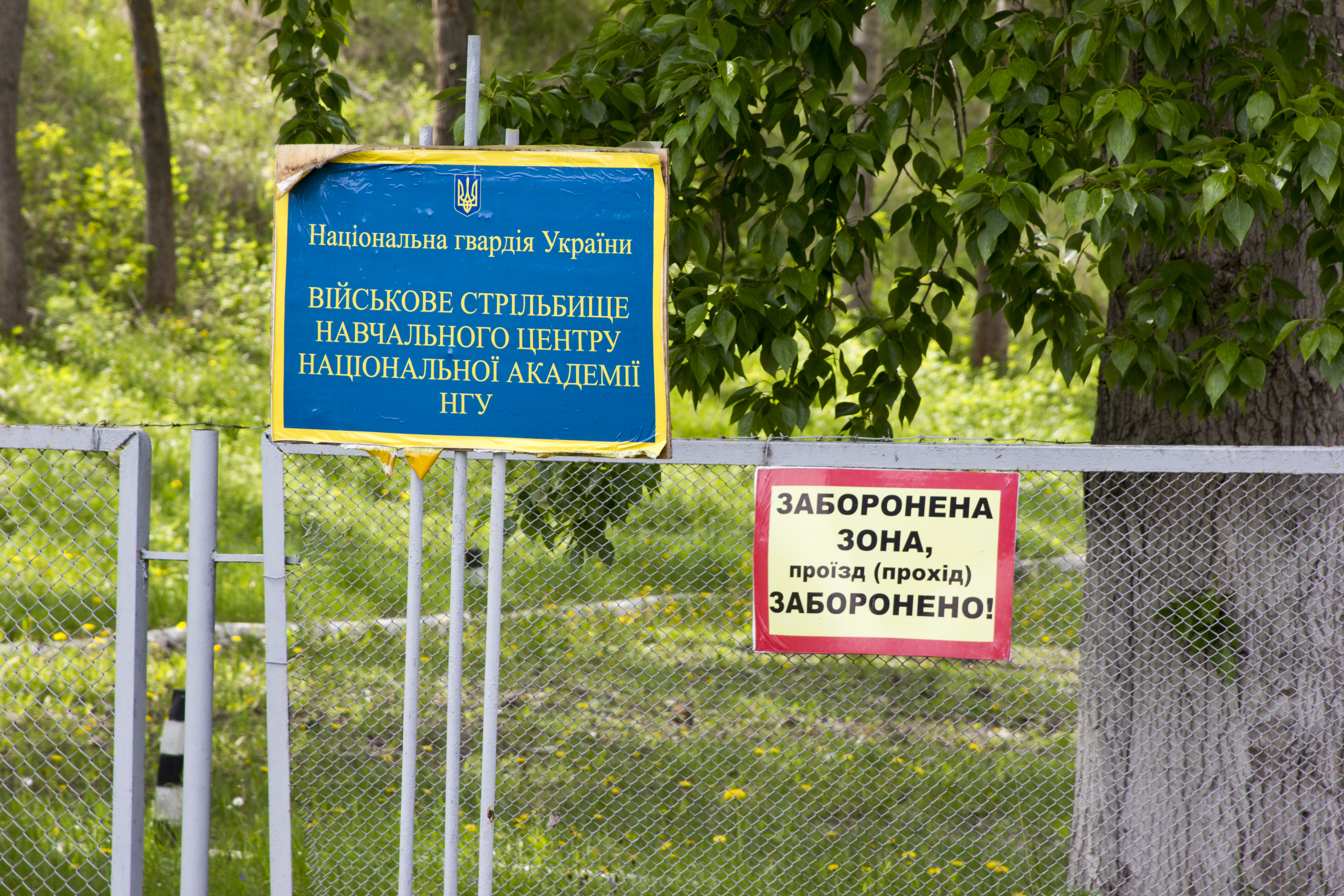
Shooting range of the National Guard of Ukraine

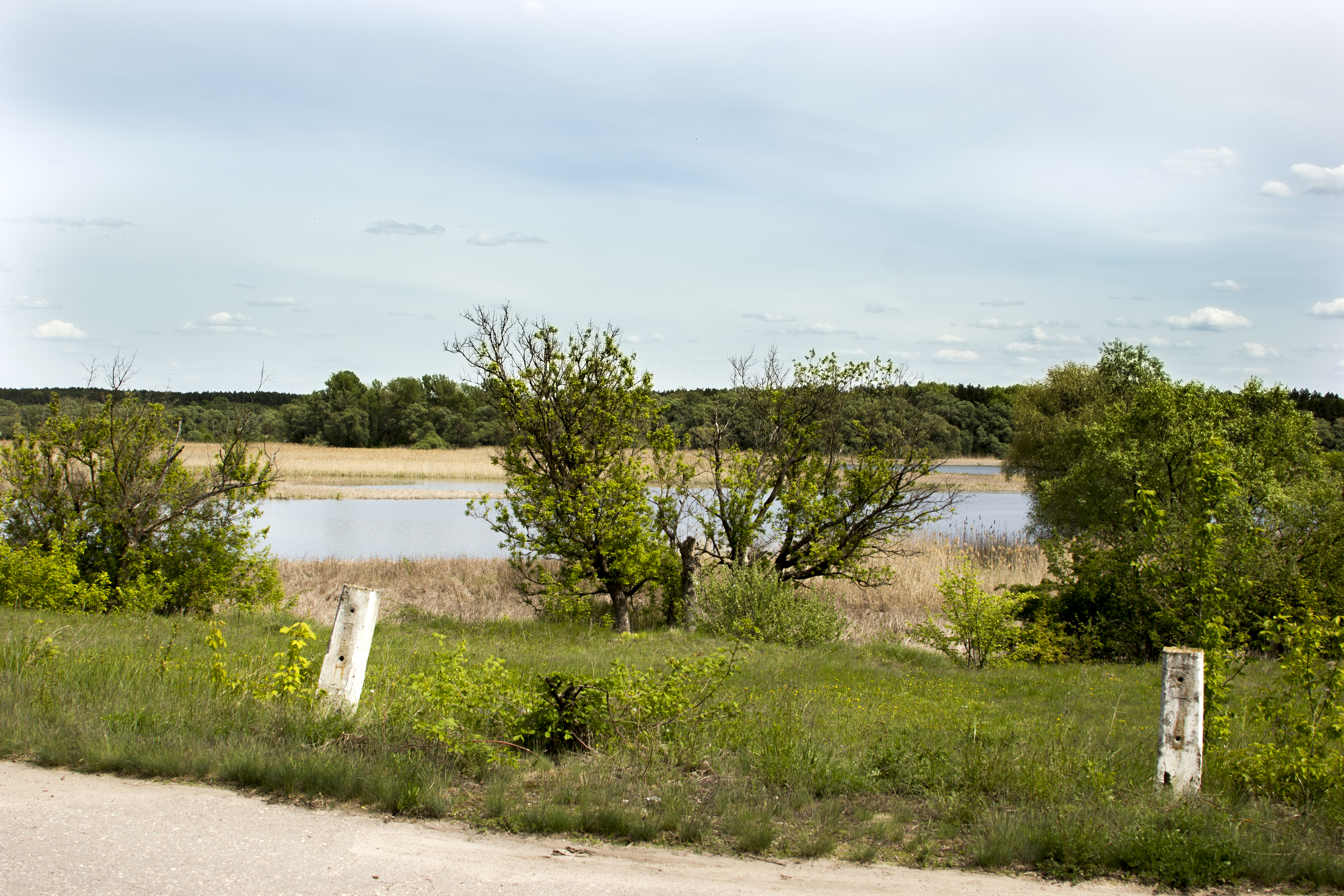
Siverskyi Donets

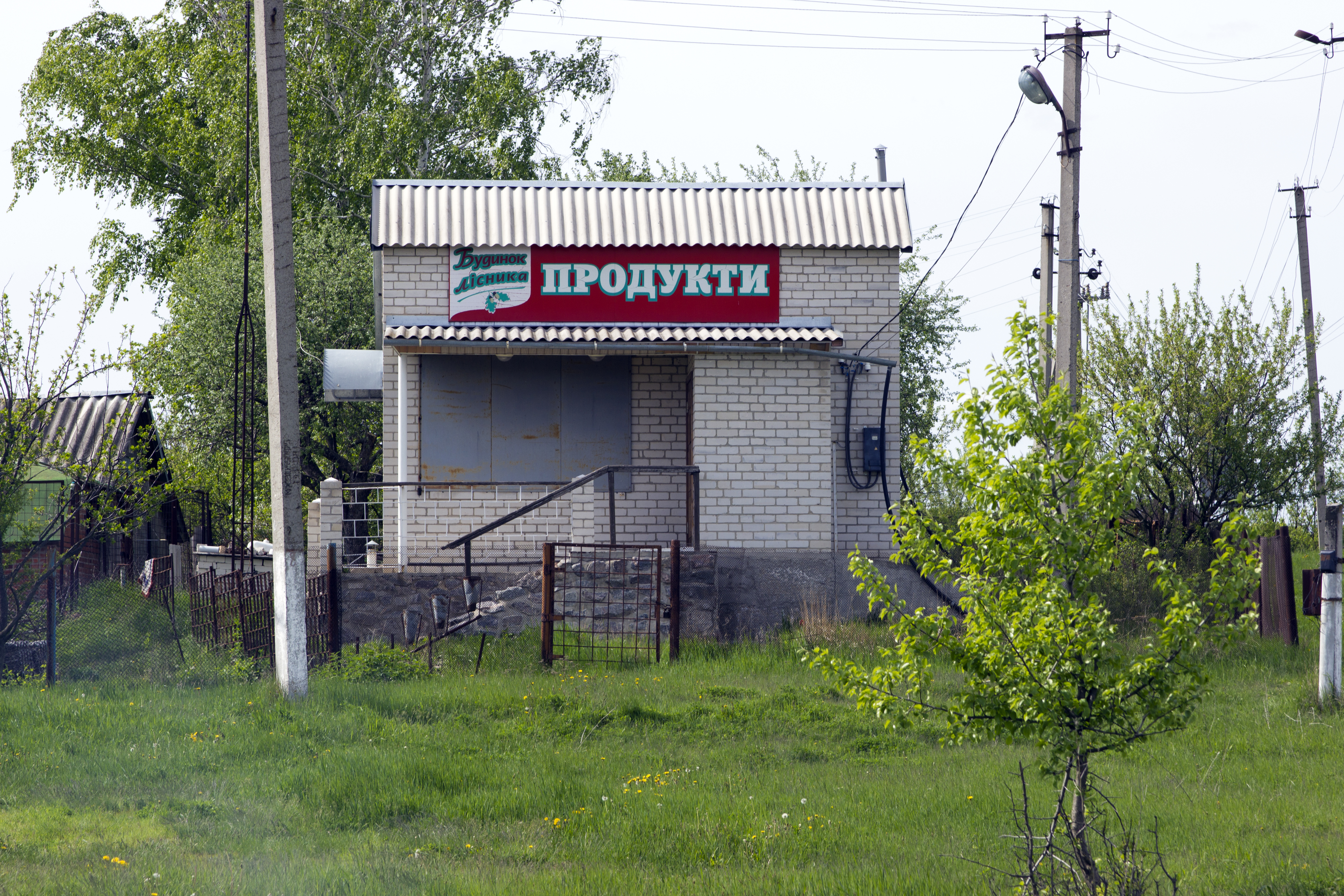
Store Forester's House

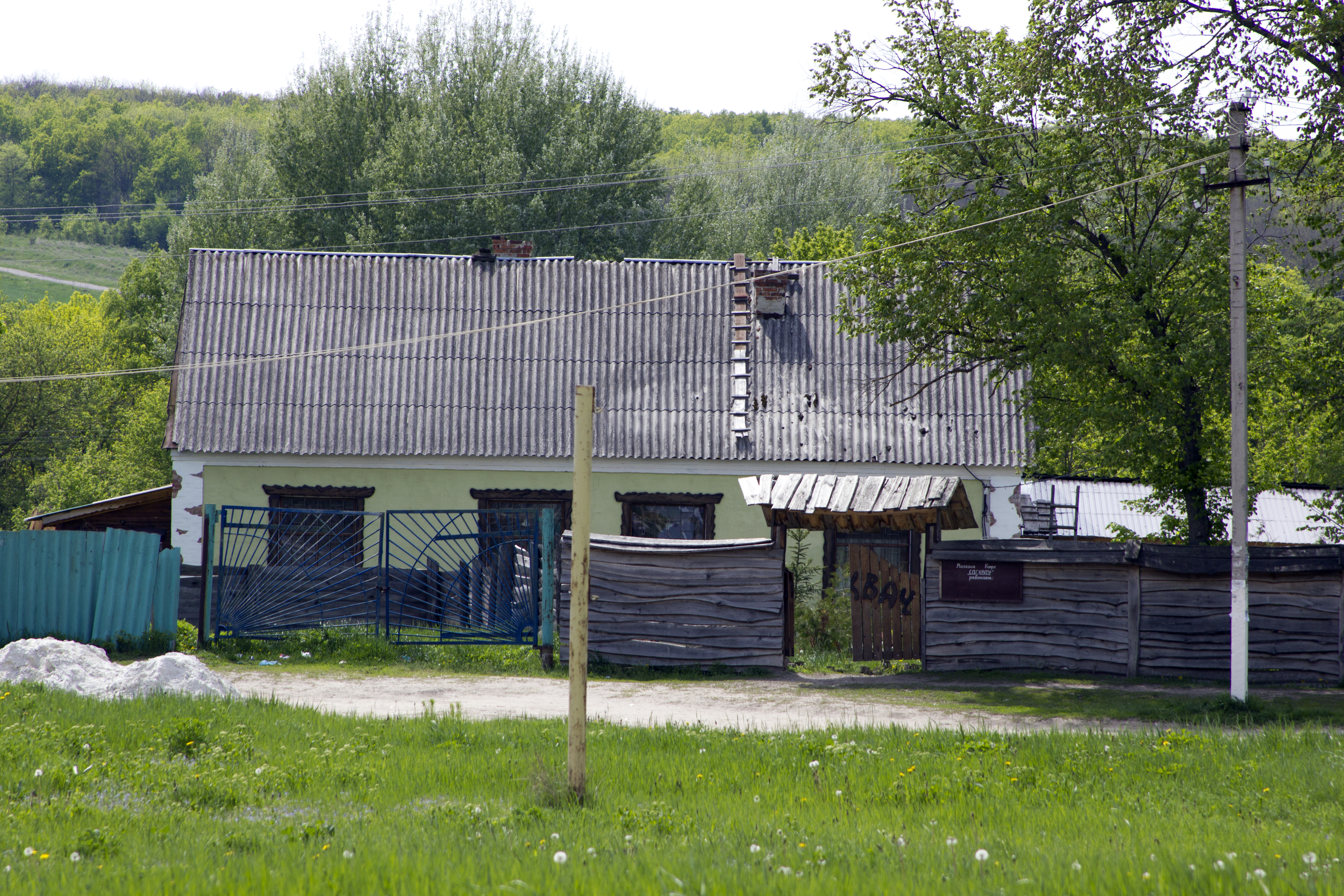
Cafe

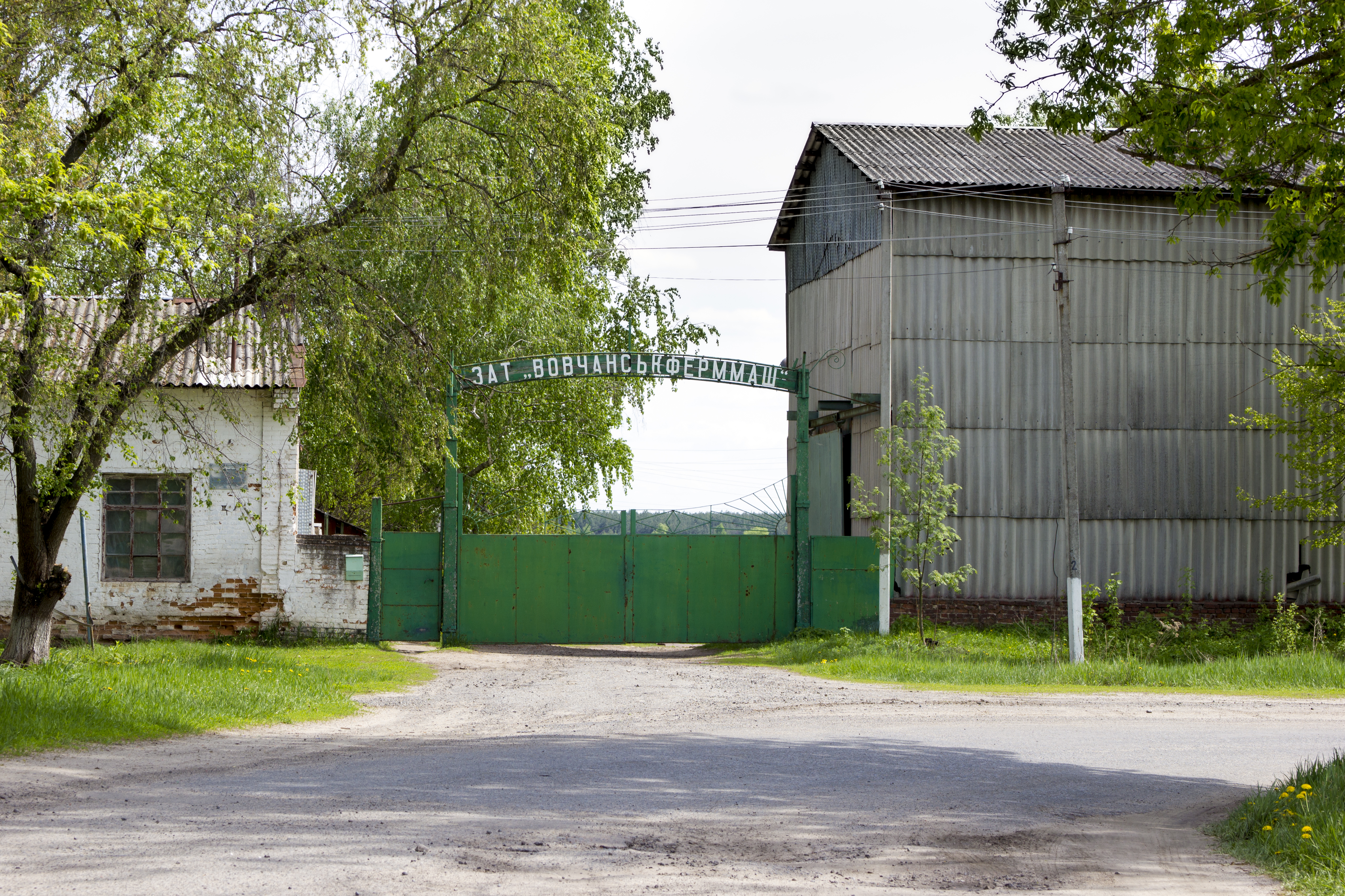
CJSC "Vovchanskfermmash"

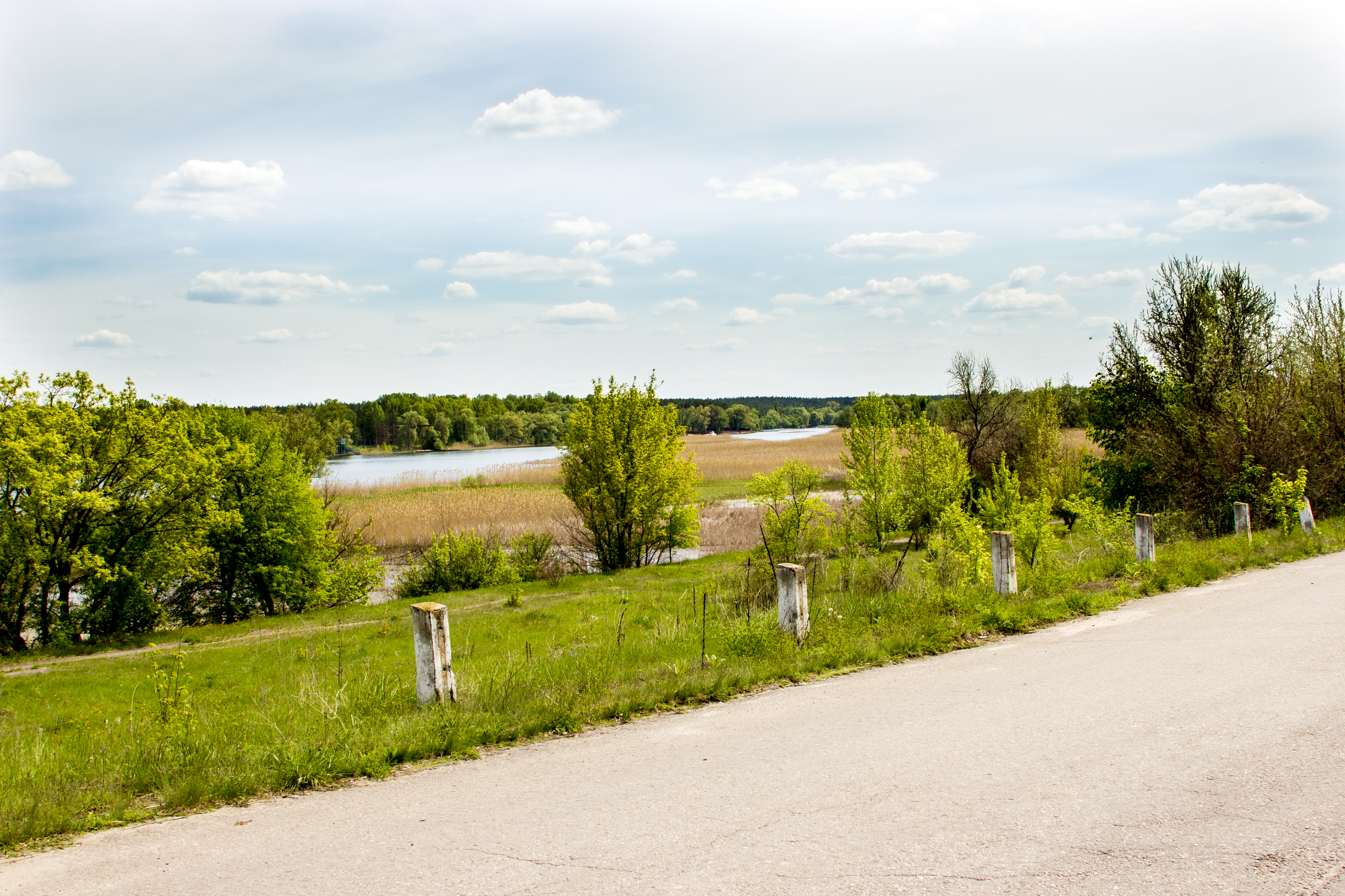
Views

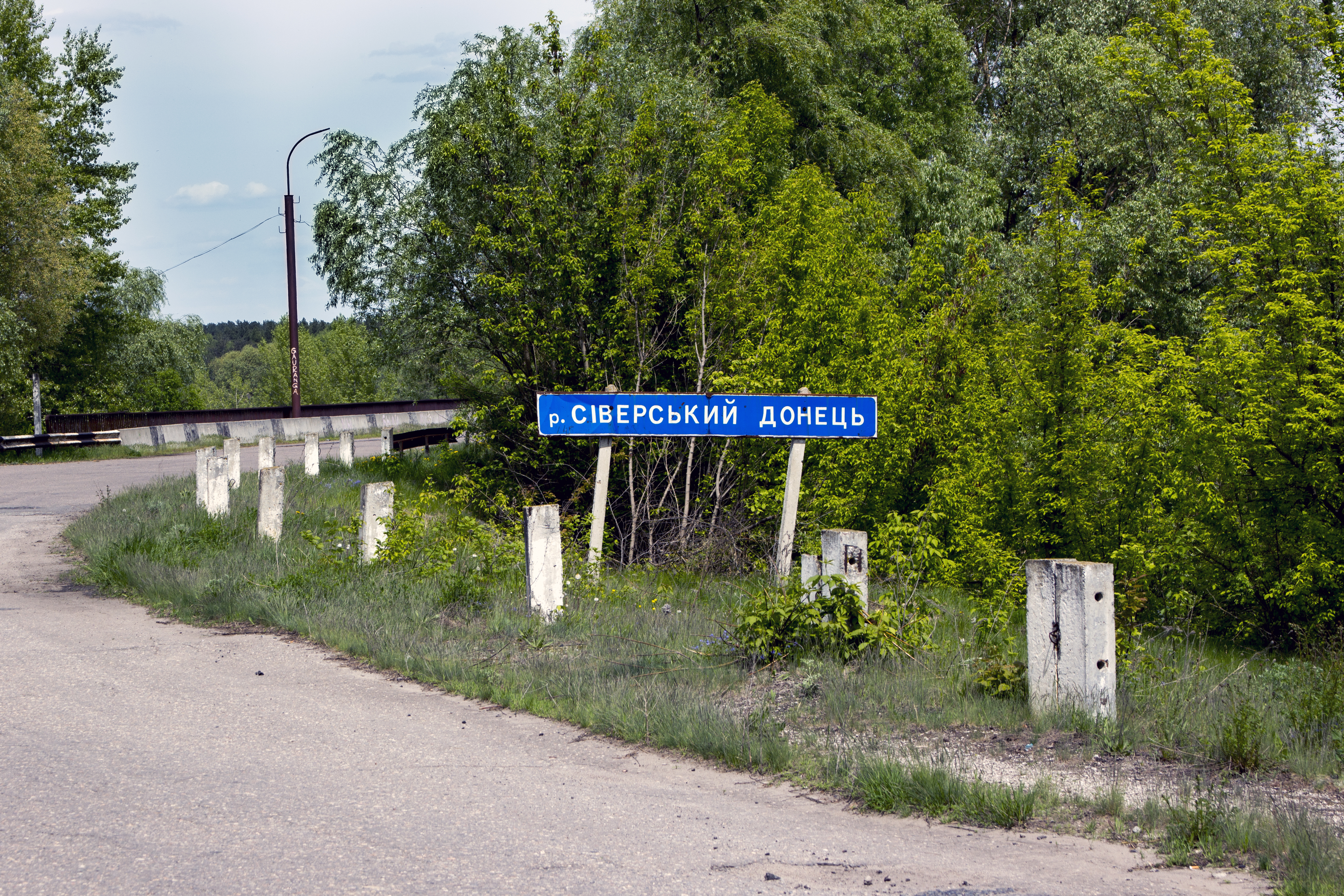
Siverskyi Donets
