= Novoplatonivka =

Rural locality in Kharkiv Oblast, Ukraine

Novoplatonivka Новоплатонівка
- Urban-type settlement
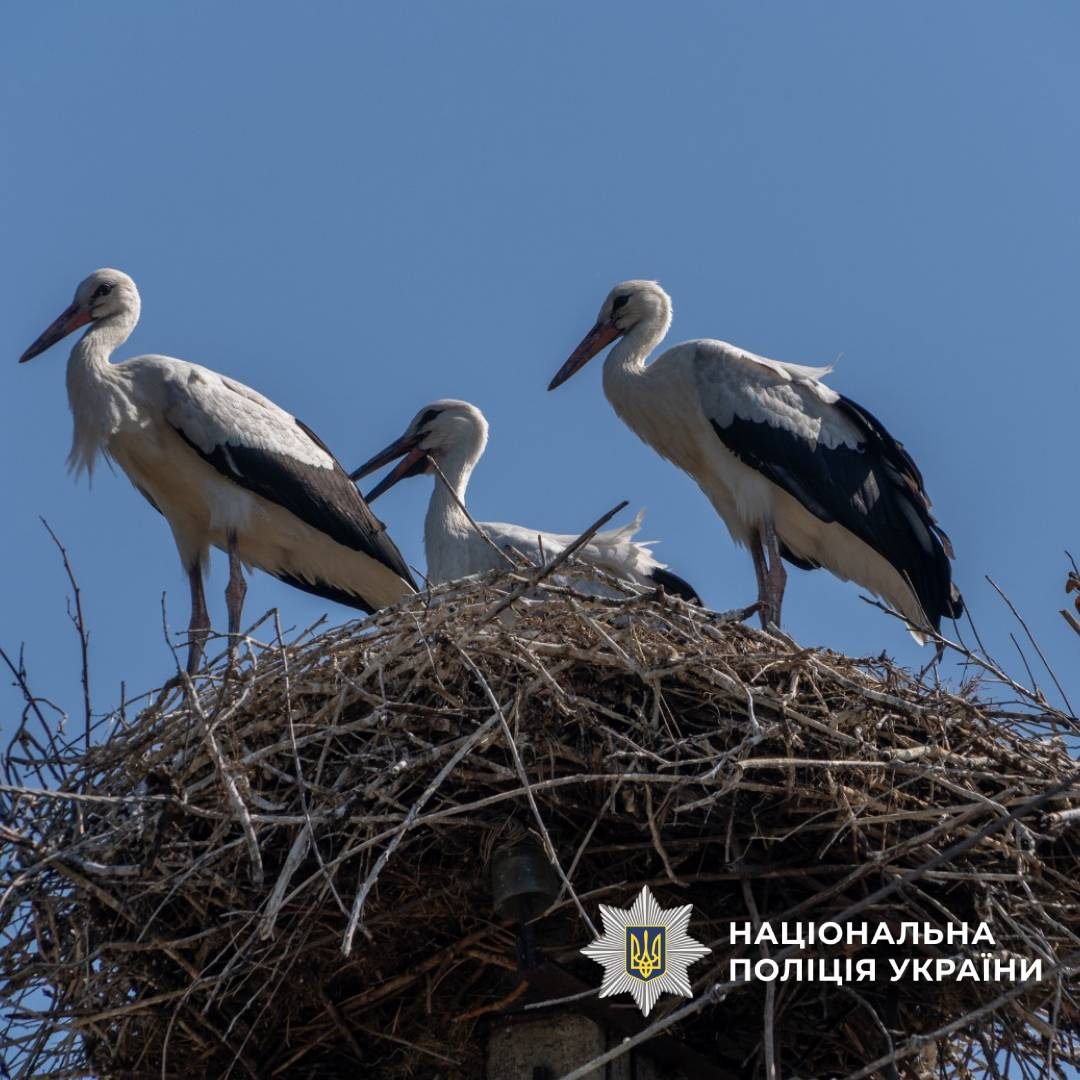

- Location within Ukraine Location within Kharkiv Oblast
- Coordinates: 49°25′39″N 37°38′35″E
- Country: Ukraine
- Oblast: Kharkiv Oblast
- Raion: Izium Raion
- Established: 1910

Area
  - Total: 2,365 km^{2} (913 sq mi)

Population (2001)
  - Total: 460
  - Density: 194.5/km^{2} (504/sq mi)
- Time zone: UTC+2 (EET)
  - Summer (DST): UTC+3 (EEST)
- Postal code: 63808
- Area code: 05759

Novoplatonivka (Ukrainian: Новоплатонівка) is a village in northeastern Ukraine. Novoplatonivka is located within Izium Raion, Kharkiv Oblast, Ukraine. It belongs to Borova settlement hromada, one of the hromadas of Ukraine. According to the 2001 census, the population is 460 (189 males and 271 females).

== Geographical position ==
Novoplatonivka is a village on the eastern bank of the Oskil River. A one-kilometer-wide strip of pine forest separates the village from a reservoir. Novoplatonivka is located three kilometers west of the village of Borova. It is close to Avtoshliakh R 79. The nearest train station is 7.6 km south in the town of Bohuslavka.

== History ==
The village was established in 1910 by settlers from the Yekaterinoslav region. The village is named in honor of Platon Kalnitsky, a confidant of the landowner Sofia Nikolaevna Pekhovskaya, who sold her land to immigrants.

Until 18 July 2020, Novoplatonivka belonged to Borova Raion. The raion was abolished in July 2020 as part of the administrative reform of Ukraine, which reduced the number of raions of Kharkiv Oblast to seven. The area of Borova Raion was merged into Izium Raion.

On 29 July 2025 Russian strike on the village killed 6 people who came to a shop to get humanitarian aid.

== Economy ==
Commercial fish spawning and feeding takes place in Odnorebrivska Bay and the nearby reservoir's shallow waters, an area of 90 hectares, between the village of Novoplatonivka and Borova. Additionally, the Borova gas compressor station is located a few kilometers away.

== Sights ==
- Mass grave of Soviet soldiers
- Novoplatonivsky burial ground

== Social facilities ==
- Novoplatonivka Comprehensive School I-III level
