= Borivska Andriyivka =

Village in Kharkiv Oblast, Ukraine

Borivska Andriyivka Борівська Андріївка
- Village
- Interactive map of Borivska Andriyivka
- Borivska Andriyivka in Kharkiv Oblast Borivska Andriyivka (Ukraine)
- Coordinates: 49.409444°N 37.730833°E
- Country: Ukraine
- Oblast: Kharkiv Oblast
- Raion: Izium Raion
- Founded: 1785

Area
  - Total: 1.433 km^{2} (0.553 sq mi)
- Elevation: 106 m (348 ft)

Population (2001 census)
  - Total: 163
  - Density: 114/km^{2} (295/sq mi)
- Time zone: UTC+2 (EET)
  - Summer (DST): UTC+3 (EEST)
- Postal code: 63807
- Area code: +380 5759

Borivs'ka Andriyivka (Ukrainian: Борівська Андріївка; Russian: Боровская Андреевка) is a village in Izium Raion (district) in Kharkiv Oblast of eastern Ukraine, at about 125.3 kilometres (77.9 mi) south-east from the centre of Kharkiv city.

The village came under attack by Russian forces in 2022, during the Russian invasion of Ukraine, and was regained by Ukrainian forces in the beginning of October the same year.
