= Chornobaivka, Kharkiv Oblast =

Coordinates: 49°31′30″N 37°21′24″E

Chornobaivka (Ukrainian: Чорноба́ївка) is a village in Izium Raion, Kharkiv Oblast. It has a population of 40.

== Demographics ==
By the time of the 1989 Soviet census, the population of the village was 86, of whom 35 were men and 51 women.

By the time of the 2001 Ukrainian census, the population had shrunk to 61. Of the village's population, 86.89% spoke Ukrainian and 13.11 spoke Russian.
