= Velyka Babka =

Village in Kharkiv Oblast, Ukraine

Velyka Babka Велика Бабка
- Village
- Interactive map of Velyka Babka
- Location of Velyka Babka within Ukraine Velyka Babka (Ukraine)
- Coordinates: 49.981667°N 36.746389°E
- Country: Ukraine
- Oblast: Kharkiv Oblast
- District: Chuhuiv Raion
- Founded: 1647

Area
  - Total: 3.7 km^{2} (1.4 sq mi)
- Elevation: 105 m (344 ft)

Population (2001 census)
  - Total: 700
  - Density: 190/km^{2} (490/sq mi)
- Time zone: UTC+2 (EET)
  - Summer (DST): UTC+3 (EEST)
- Postal code: 64510
- Area code: +380 5746

Velyka Babka (Ukrainian: Велика Бабка; Russian: Большая Бабка) is a village in Chuhuiv Raion (district) in Kharkiv Oblast of eastern Ukraine, at about 30 kilometres (19 mi) east from the centre of Kharkiv city. Velyka Babka belongs to Chuhuiv urban hromada, one of the hromadas of Ukraine.

== History ==
- The village of Velyka Babka was founded in 1647.
- In 1918 Soviet power was established in the village.
- In 26 December 1991 the Soviet Union fell. The village is now in Ukraine.
- In 1992-1993 the village was officially called Velyka Babka.
