= Sharovsky =

Sharovsky is a surname. Notable people with the surname include:

- Alexander Sharovsky (1948–2026), Azerbaijani actor and theatre director
- Vasyl Sharovsky (1891–1938), Ukrainian anarcho-communist
