= Kostiantivka =

Rural locality in Kharkiv Oblast, Ukraine

Kostiantivka Костянтівка
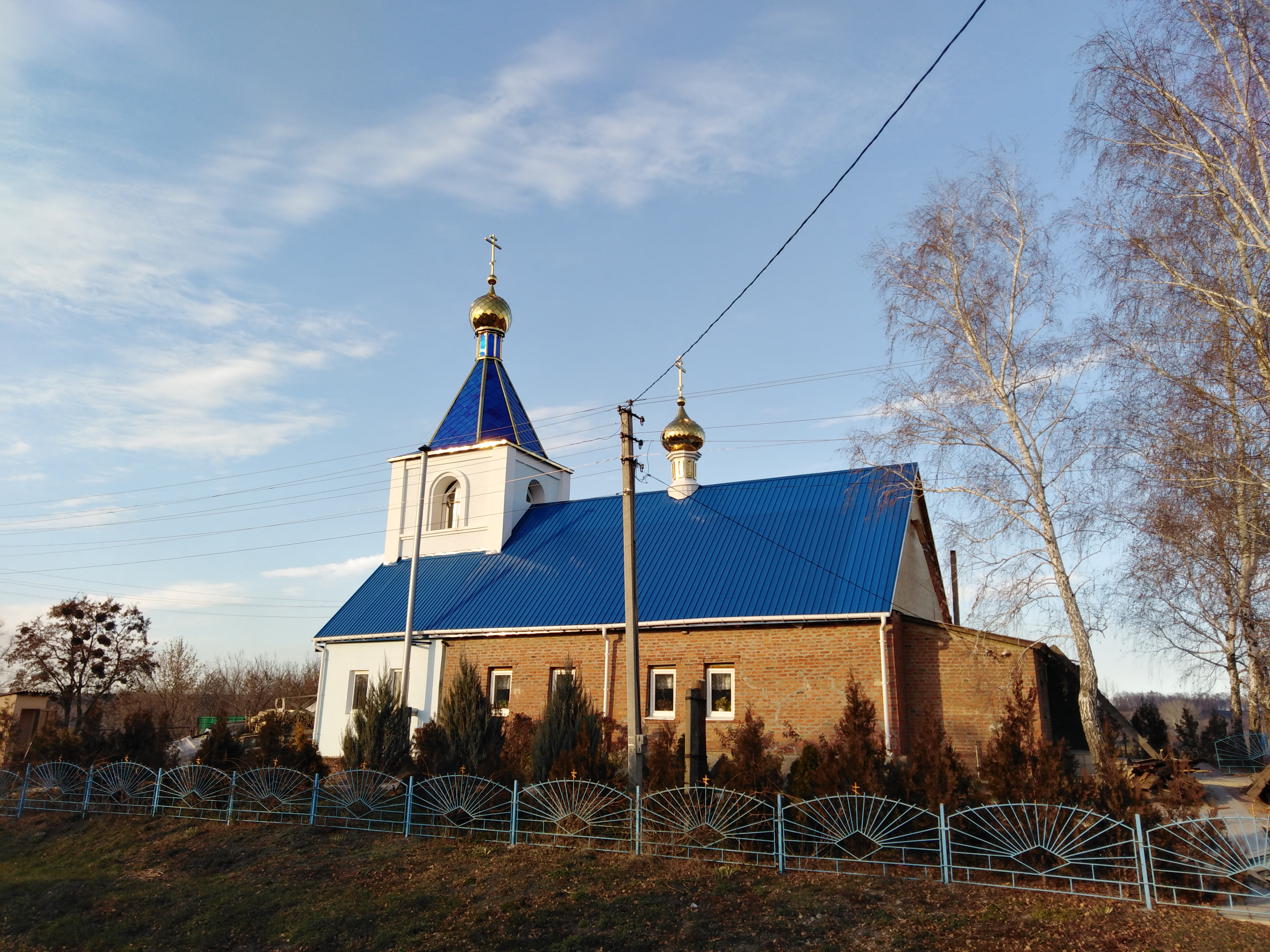

- Location in Ukraine Kostiantivka (Kharkiv Oblast)
- Coordinates: 49°046′N 36°15′E
- Country: Ukraine
- Oblast: Kharkiv Oblast
- Raion: Chuhuiv Raion
- Village founded: 1661

Area
  - Total: 1,955 km^{2} (755 sq mi)
- Elevation: 158 m (518 ft)

Population (2001)
  - Total: 424
  - Density: 216.88/km^{2} (561.7/sq mi)
- Time zone: UTC+2 (EET)
  - Summer (DST): UTC+3 (EEST)
- Postal code: 63412
- Area code: +380 5747

Kostiantivka (Ukrainian: Костянтівка) is a village in Chuhuiv Raion, Kharkiv Oblast, Ukraine. It belongs to Zmiiv urban hromada, one of the hromadas of Ukraine. The village has a population of 424 (2001).

== Geographical location ==
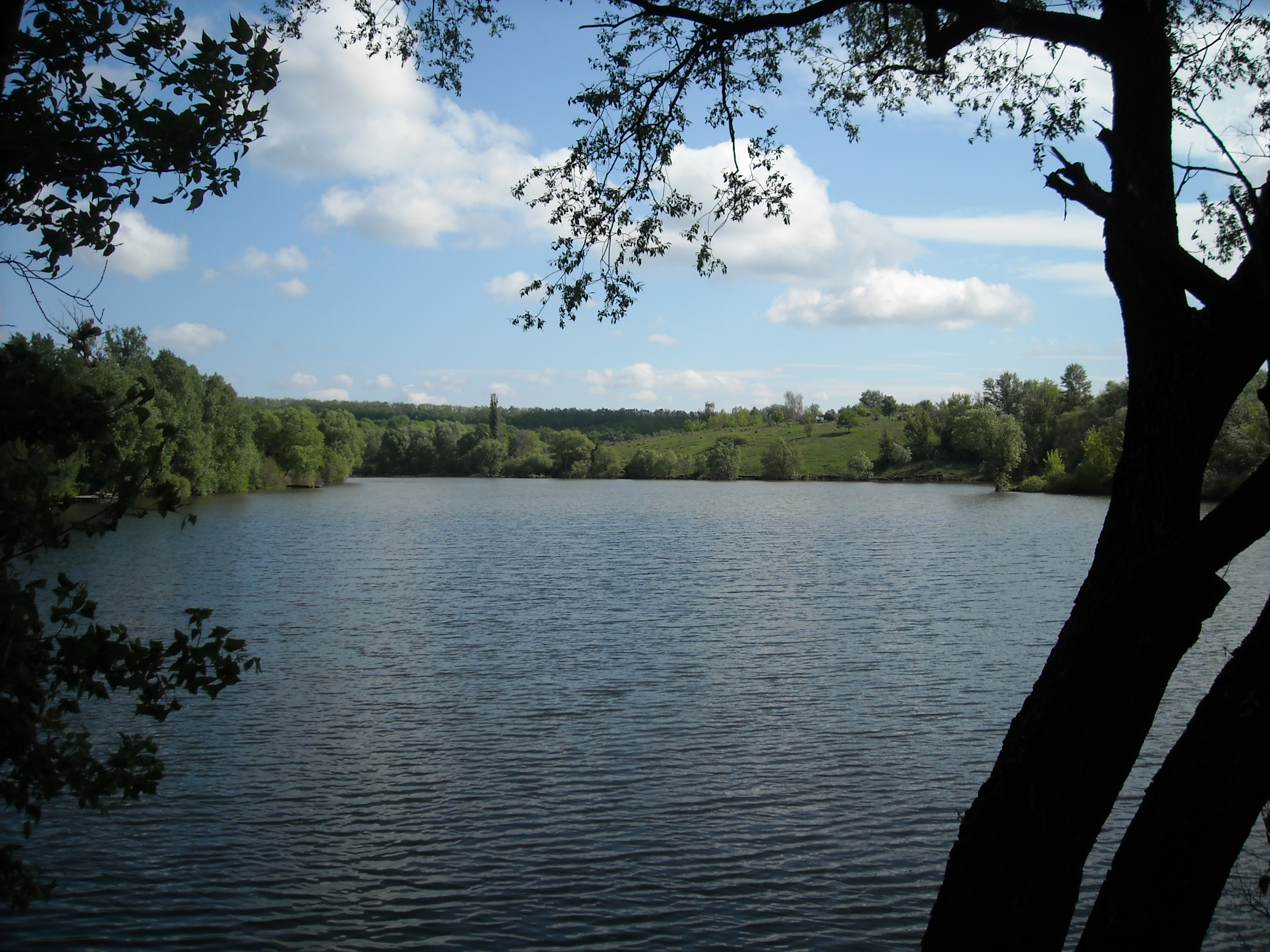
View from the dam to the stake rate. On the hill was the Zakharzhevsky estate

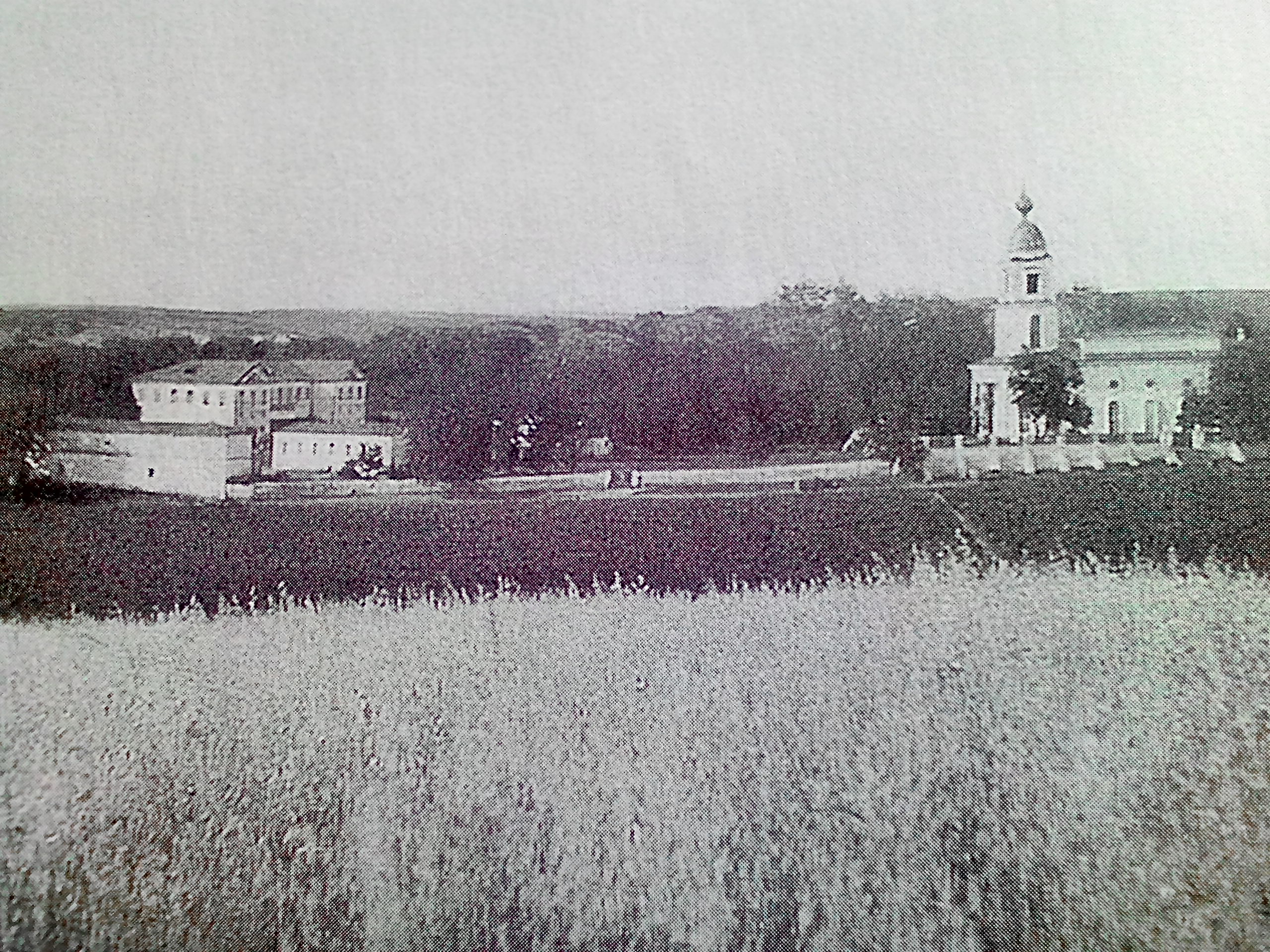
The Golovkin-Khvoshchinsky estate (before Donets-Zakharzhevsky) and the Nativity of the Virgin church (1914)

The village is located at the source of the Borova river (the left tributary of the river Mozh) between the rivers Mozh (8 km or 5.0 mi) and Uda (5 km or 3.1 mi). Three km (1.9 mi) from the village, there is a railway station Zvidki.

== Origin of the name ==
The original name of the village Kostiantynivka was formed on behalf of the first owner Kostiantyn Donets-Zakharzewsky colonel of the Izium Cossack Regiment, son of the Grigory Donets-Zakharzhevsky, colonel of the Kharkiv Cossack Regiment.

== History ==
- 1661 is the date of foundation.
- 1689 – the lands belonging to the Birky inhabitants who lost them for "robbery", part of the remaining unoccupied, were Kostiantyn Donets-Zakharzewsky colonel of the Izium Cossack Regiment in the possession of the royal diploma of 1689, and approved by his children by his pledged letter of July 12, 1693 for the award "for many services of his grandfather Grigory, and for the service and death of their father Kostiantyn", killed in a battle with the tatars in 1692. Perhaps it was then that the village was called Kostiantynivka.
- 1689–1871 years – estate Donets-Zakharzewsky.
- The first temple of the Nativity of the Virgin Mary was built not later than 1690.
- 1693 – a tsar certificate of July 12, Kostiantynivka, Velykyi Burluk and Khutne approved by descendants Grigory and Kostiantyn Donets-Zakharzhevsky.
- 1699 year sloboda as part of the Zmiiv sotnia Kharkiv Slobodsky Cossack Regiment became part of the newly formed Izium Slobodsky Cossack Regiment.
- In 1780 Kharkiv governorate was created. Sloboda Kostiantynivka became a member of the Kharkiv district governorate.
- In 1797 Kharkiv governorate was renamed to Sloboda Ukraine Governorate. As part of the newly formed province on the basis of the abolished Chuhuiv powiat, a new Zmiiv powiat was formed, which included the settlement Kostiantynivka.
- 1798 Andrii Donets-Zakharzhevsky built a new stone church of the Nativity of the Blessed Virgin Mary, in place of the old church. The architect was Yaroslavsky Petro, Kharkiv city architect.
- According to the data of 1864 the year in the owner's village Zamostian volost Zmiiv powiat, there were 809 inhabitants (387 males and 422 women), there were 159 dairy farms, there was an orthodox church, there was 2 fair in a year.
- 1871 – the latter in the genus Donets-Zakharzhevsky, Active State Councillor Dmitry, was strangled by his nephew, Pohvisnev. The village passes to his son-in-law, count Golovkin-Khvoshchinsky.
- As of 1897, there were 1,340 people living in the village in the village (654 males and 686 females).
- As of 1914, the number of inhabitants increased to 1,671 persons.
- In 1931 the Soviet authorities the village was renamed Kostantyvka.
- The village suffered as a result of genocide of the Ukrainian people held by the USSR government in 1932–1933, the number of victims identified in Vodyane, Krasna Polyana and Kostantyvka – 246 people.
- 1941–1943 – The village was occupied by German-Nazi troops.
- August 27, 1943 year forces of the 113th Infantry Division Red Army regained the village.
- 1963 – The victim of the Second World War, the temple of the Nativity of the Blessed Virgin Mary, was completely destroyed.

Until 18 July 2020, Kostiantivka belonged to Zmiiv Raion. The raion was abolished in July 2020 as part of the administrative reform of Ukraine, which reduced the number of raions of Kharkiv Oblast to seven. The area of Zmiivk Raion was merged into Chuhuiv Raion.
