= Lozivske =

Village in Kharkiv Oblast, Ukraine

Lozivske Лозівське
- Location of Lozivske Lozivske (Ukraine)
- Coordinates: 49°13′08″N 36°33′45″E
- Country: Ukraine
- Oblast: Kharkiv Oblast
- Raion: Lozova Raion

Population (2001)
  - Total: 191
- Postal code: 64144
- Climate: Cfa

Lozivske (Ukrainian: Лозівське) is a village in Lozova Raion, Kharkiv Oblast (province) of Ukraine.

Lozivske was previously located in the Pervomaiskyi Raion. The raion was abolished on 18 July 2020 as part of the administrative reform of Ukraine, which reduced the number of raions of Kharkiv Oblast to seven. The area of Pervomaiskyi Raion was merged into Lozova Raion.
