= Zelenyi Hai, Lozova Raion, Kharkiv Oblast =

Rural locality in Kharkiv Oblast, Ukraine

Coordinates: 49°10′9″N 36°36′37″E

Zelenyi Hai (Ukrainian: Зелений Гай) is a village in Lozova Raion, Kharkiv Oblast, Ukraine. It belongs to Lozova urban hromada, one of the hromadas of Ukraine.
