= Zatyshne, Crimea =

Zatyshne
- Village
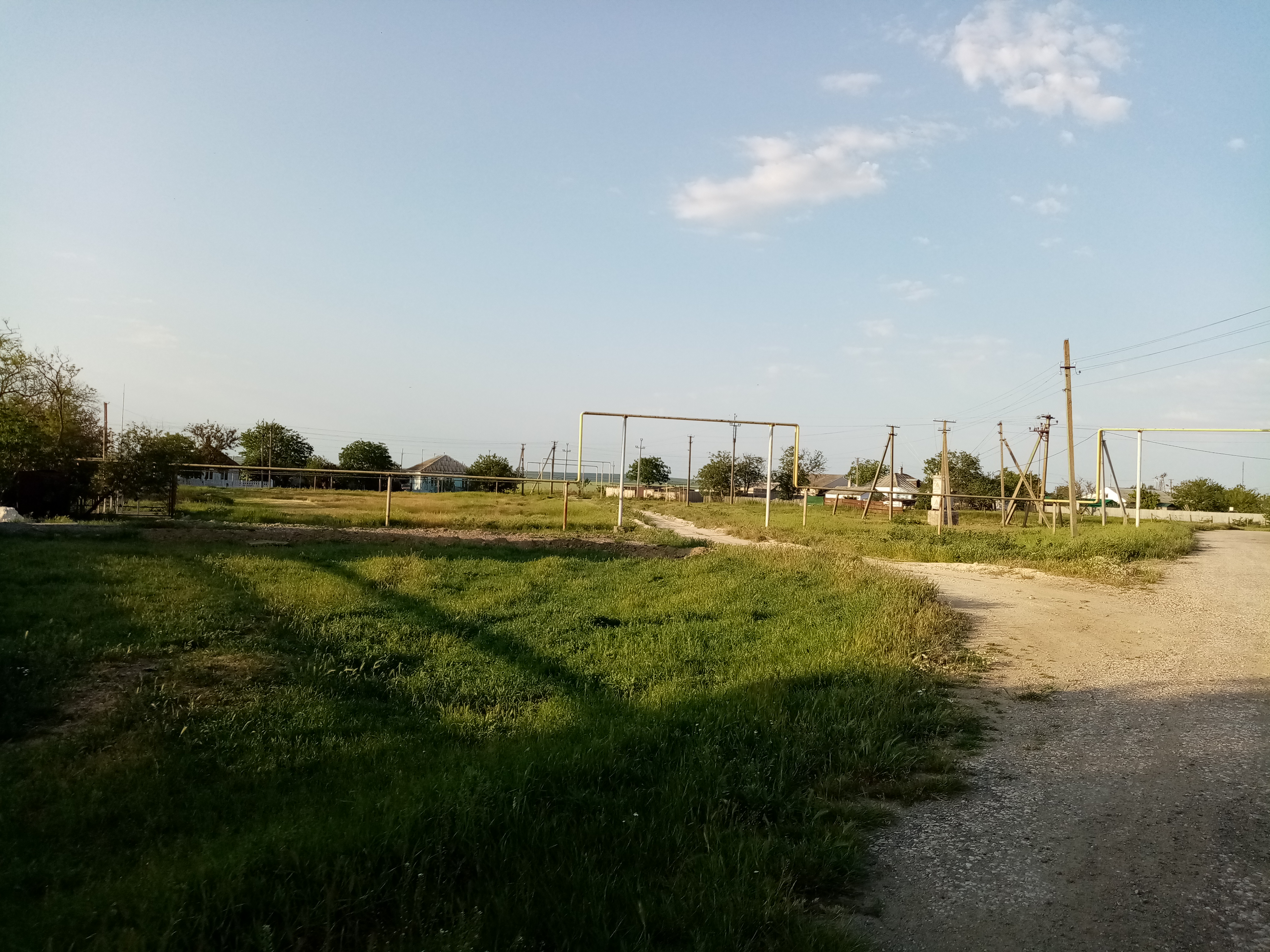

- Location within Crimea
- Coordinates: 45°22′20″N 36°11′05″E
- Country: Disputed: Ukraine (de jure); Russia (de facto)
- Region: (Autonomous Republic of Crimea) Crimea^{1}
- Municipality: Lenine

Population
  - Total: 153
- Time zone: UTC+4 (MSK)
- ^{1} Autonomous Republic of Crimea (de jure) or Republic of Crimea (de facto), depending on jurisdiction.

Zatyshne (Russian: Затишное; Ukrainian: Затишне; Crimean Tatar: Zatişnoye) is a village located in Lenine Raion, Crimea. Population: 153 (2014 Census).

== See also ==
- Lenine Raion
