= Zatyshne, Kharkiv Raion, Kharkiv Oblast =

Village in Kharkiv Oblast, Ukraine

Zatyshne Затишне
- Location of Zatyshne Zatyshne (Ukraine)
- Coordinates: 49°52′21″N 36°09′46″E
- Country: Ukraine
- Oblast: Kharkiv Oblast
- Raion: Kharkiv Raion
- Elevation: 206 m (676 ft)

Population (2001)
  - Total: 107
- Postal code: 62403
- Area code: +380 57
- Climate: Cfa

Zatyshne (Ukrainian: Затишне), known as Radhospne until 2016, is a village in Kharkiv Raion, Kharkiv Oblast (province) of Ukraine.
