= Zemlianky, Berestyn Raion, Kharkiv Oblast =

Village in Kharkiv Oblast, Ukraine

Zemlianky Землянки
- Location of Zemlianky Zemlianky (Ukraine)
- Coordinates: 49°11′56″N 35°38′11″E
- Country: Ukraine
- Oblast: Kharkiv Oblast
- Raion: Berestyn Raion
- Hromada: Kehychivka settlement hromada
- Elevation: 135 m (443 ft)

Population (2001)
  - Total: 172
- Postal code: 64031
- Area code: +380 5755
- Climate: Cfa

Zemlianky (Ukrainian: Землянки) is a village in Berestyn Raion, Kharkiv Oblast (province) of Ukraine.

Until 18 July 2020, Zemlianky was located in Kehychivka Raion The raion was abolished on 18 July 2020 as part of the administrative reform of Ukraine, which reduced the number of raions of Kharkiv Oblast to seven. The area of Kehychivka Raion was merged into Krasnohrad Raion (modern Berestyn Raion).
