= Skoryky, Kharkiv Oblast =

Rural locality in Kharkiv Oblast, Ukraine

Skoryky Скорики
- Village
- Interactive map of Skoryky
- Coordinates: 50°22′35″N 35°50′40″E
- Country: Ukraine
- Oblast: Kharkiv Oblast
- Raion: Bohodukhiv Raion
- Established: 1700

Area
  - Total: 0.5 km^{2} (0.19 sq mi)
- Elevation: 157 m (515 ft)

Population
  - Total: 98
  - Density: 200/km^{2} (510/sq mi)
- Postal code: 62214
- Area code: +380 5764

Skoryky is a village in Bohodukhiv Raion, Kharkiv Oblast, Ukraine. It belongs to Zolochiv settlement hromada, one of the hromadas of Ukraine. The population is 98 people.

Until 18 July 2020, Skoryky belonged to Zolochiv Raion. The raion was abolished in July 2020 as part of the administrative reform of Ukraine, which reduced the number of raions of Kharkiv Oblast to seven. The area of Zolochiv Raion was merged into Bohodukhiv Raion.

== Geography ==
The village of Skoryky is located on the east bank of the Grayvoronka River. The village of Zavadske is located 1 km (0.62 mi) upstream, the village of Ivashki is adjacent downstream, and the village of Oleksandrivka, Kharkiv Oblast is on the opposite bank. The village is 2 km (1.2 mi) from both Muravsky railway station and highway T 2103 .
