= Zatyshne, Kupiansk Raion, Kharkiv Oblast =

Village in Kharkiv Oblast, Ukraine

Zatyshne Затишне
- Location of Zatyshne Zatyshne (Ukraine)
- Coordinates: 49°39′46″N 37°56′25″E
- Country: Ukraine
- Oblast: Kharkiv Oblast
- Raion: Kupiansk Raion
- Elevation: 144 m (472 ft)

Population (2001)
  - Total: 9
- Postal code: 63740
- Area code: +380 5742
- Climate: Cfa

Zatyshne (Ukrainian: Затишне) is a village in Kupiansk Raion, Kharkiv Oblast (province) of Ukraine. It belongs to Petropavlivka rural hromada, one of the hromadas of Ukraine.
