= Zemlianky, Chuhuiv Raion, Kharkiv Oblast =

Village in Kharkiv Oblast, Ukraine

Zemlianky Землянки
- Interactive map of Zemlianky
- Location of Zemlianky Zemlianky (Ukraine)
- Coordinates: 50°23′22″N 37°27′16″E
- Country: Ukraine
- Oblast: Kharkiv Oblast
- Raion: Chuhuiv Raion
- Elevation: 135 m (443 ft)

Population (2001)
  - Total: 338
- Postal code: 62512
- Area code: +380 5741
- Climate: Cfa

Zemlianky (Ukrainian: Землянки) is a village in Chuhuiv Raion, Kharkiv Oblast (province) of Ukraine.

Until 18 July 2020, Zemlianky was located in Vovchansk Raion. The raion was abolished on that day as part of the administrative reform of Ukraine, which reduced the number of raions of Kharkiv Oblast to seven.
