= Kost =

Kost or KOST may refer to:

- KOST, a radio station (103.5 FM) licensed to Los Angeles, California, United States
- KOST, original call letters for KILT-FM, Houston, Texas, United States
- Kost Castle, a castle in the Czech Republic
- Kost, Minnesota, a community in the United States
- Kost (surname), a surname

== Given name ==
- Kost Human, South African rugby league player who represented his country in the 1995 World Cup
- Kost Lavro (born 1961), Ukrainian artist and illustrator
- Kost Levytsky (1859–1941), Ukrainian politician
- Kost Novytsky (born 1950), Ukrainian musician
- Kost Pankivskyi (1897-1974), Ukrainian politician, publicist, lawyer, and head of the UNR government in exile

== Fictional characters ==
- Fräulein Kost, a character in the musical Cabaret and the 1972 film adaptation
