= Trostyanets =

City in Sumy Oblast, Ukraine

Trostyanets Тростянець
- City
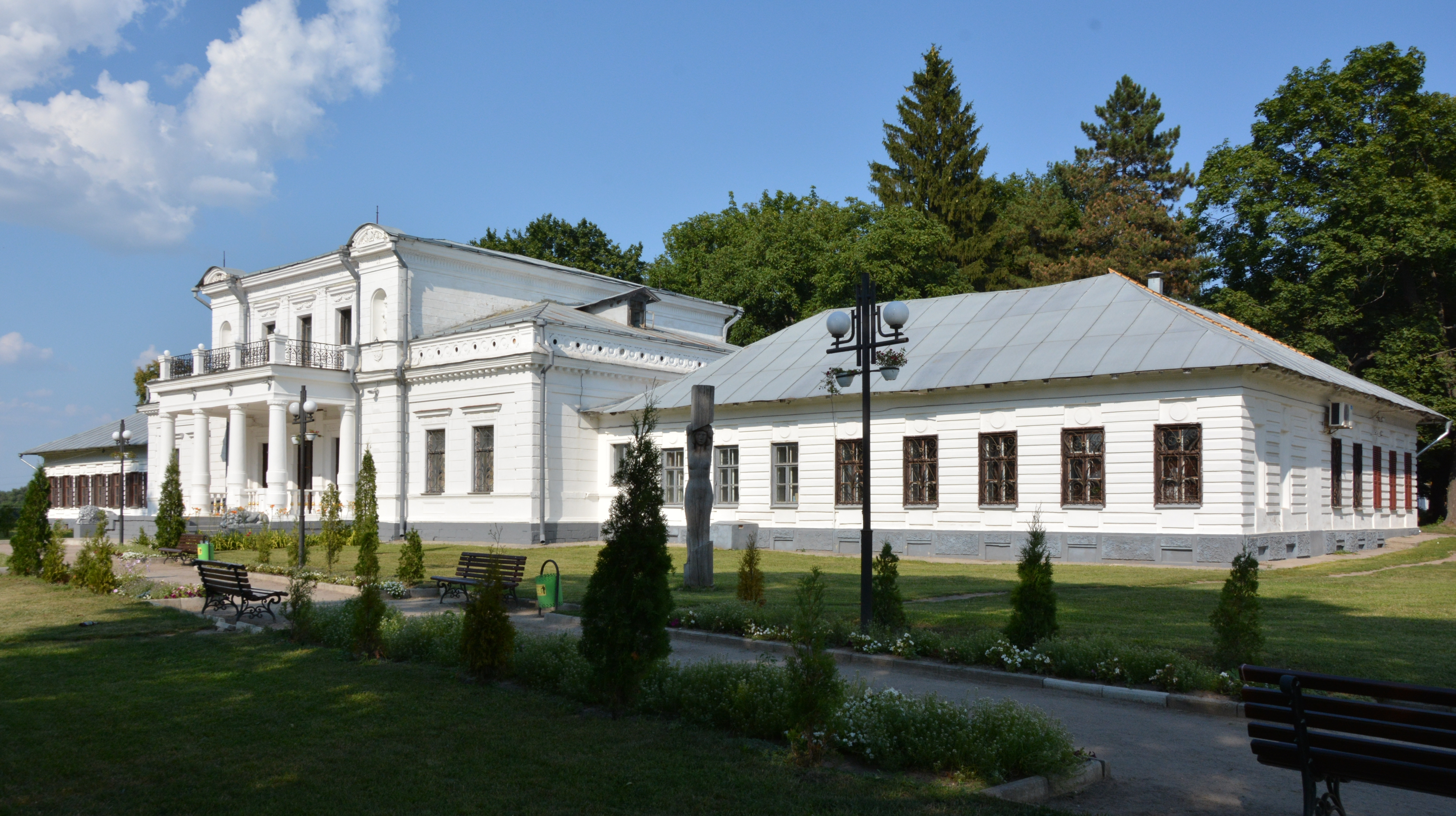
- Manor of the Nadarzhinsky-Golitsyns

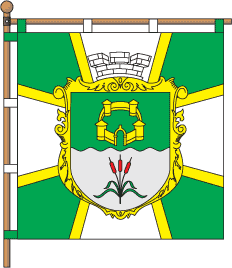
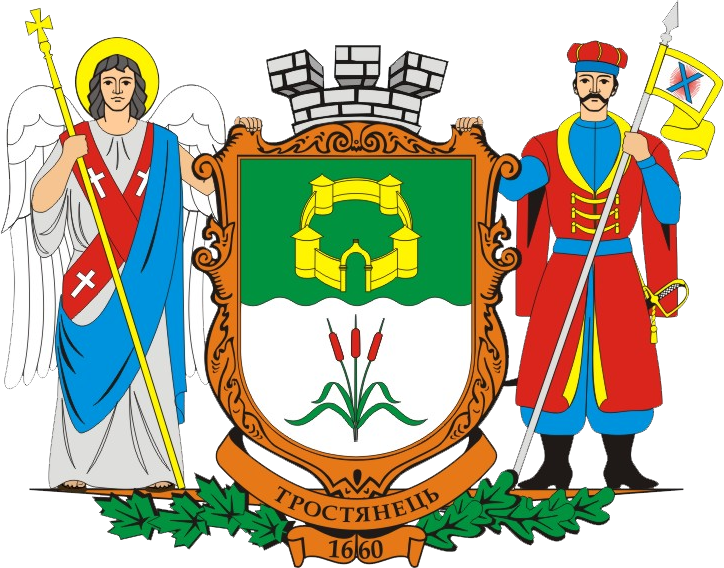
- Flag Coat of arms

- Location within Sumy Oblast Location within Ukraine
- Coordinates: 50°28′N 34°57′E
- Country: Ukraine
- Oblast: Sumy Oblast
- Raion: Okhtyrka Raion
- Hromada: Trostyanets urban hromada
- Founded: 1660

Government
  - Mayor: Yuri Bova (Power of the People)

Area
  - Total: 23.8 km^{2} (9.2 sq mi)
- Elevation: 122 m (400 ft)

Population (2022)
  - Total: 19,544
- Time zone: UTC+2 (EET)
  - Summer (DST): UTC+3 (EEST)
- Postal codes: 42600-42615
- Area code: +380 5458
- Website: Official website

Trostyanets or Trostianets (Ukrainian: Тростянець, pronounced [trosʲtʲɐˈnɛtsʲ]; Russian: Тростянец) is a city in Okhtyrka Raion of Sumy Oblast of northeastern Ukraine. It was the administrative center of Trostyanets Raion until it was abolished on 18 July 2020. The city lies on the Boromlya River, 59 km (37 mi) from Sumy. Landmarks include a neo-Gothic "Round Courtyard" (1749), the late Baroque Church of the Annunciation (1744–1750), the 18th-century Galitzine Palace, and the "Grotto of the Nymphs" (an 1809 centenary memorial to the Battle of Poltava). The Round Courtyard is depicted in the city's coat of arms. The city has a population of 19,544 (2022 estimate).

Many were killed, and the city was badly damaged during the 2022 Russian invasion of Ukraine.

== Etymology ==
Local historians say the name "Trostianets" comes from the Trostianets (or Trostianka) River, which once flowed through this area and emptied into the Boromlya River. An old map from the 1787 General Land Survey of the Okhtyrka Uyezd supports this theory, depicting a watercourse labeled "Trostianetskyi Ruchei" (Trostianets Stream) originating from the NesKuchne area.

However, there is another theory regarding the origin of the city's name: the noted linguist and researcher Alla Koval argued that the original village of Trostianets was founded by fugitive peasants—migrants from a place called Trostianets in the Vinnytsia region—who named the new settlement after their home village. That settlement still exists today.

In total, there are 11 settlements in Ukraine named Trostianets: one each in the Sumy, Vinnytsia, and Zakarpattia regions, and two each in the Lviv, Ivano-Frankivsk, Rivne, and Chernihiv regions. Additionally, the villages of Velykyi Trostianets and Malyi Trostianets are located near Poltava.

== History ==
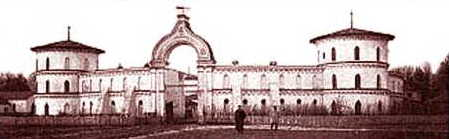
Round Courtyard

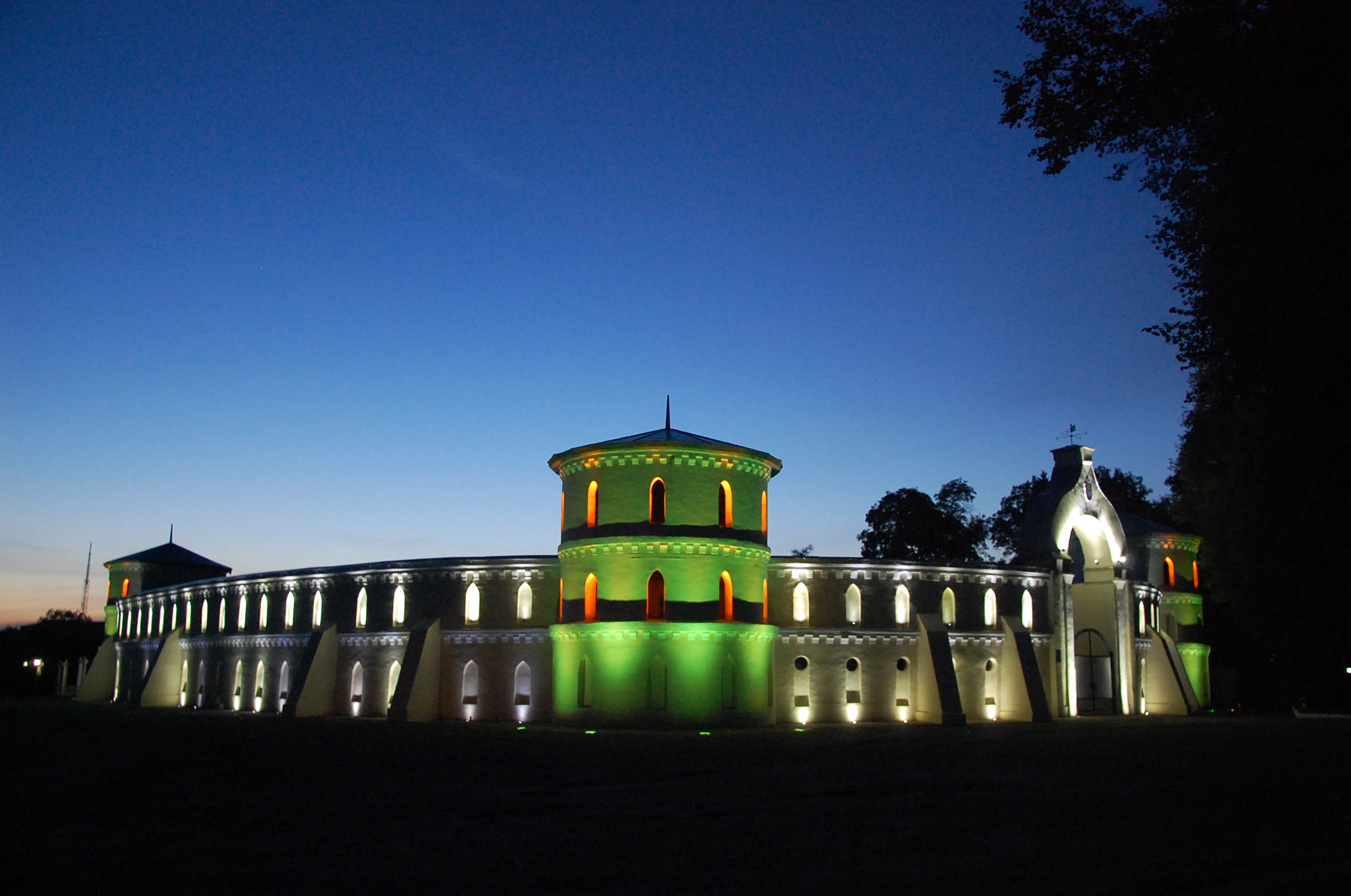
Round Courtyard (modern times)

According to archaeological excavations, the area was settled in the 8th-10th centuries. Trostyanets was established as a village by peasants and Cossacks from the Right-bank Ukraine in the 1650s, but it was first mentioned in 1660. The migration was caused by defeat of Ukrainian forces at the Battle of Berestechko in 1651 by the Crown of Poland forces.

In 1704, Trostianets, along with other villages, became part of the state-owned estates.

Until 1765, Trostyanets was under the jurisdiction of the Okhtyrka Regiment, then part of Sloboda Ukraine. From 1780, Trostyanets was part of the Akhtyrka Uyezd within the Sloboda Ukraine Governorate and then Kharkov Governorate of the Russian Empire. From 1720, the village was owned by Tymofiy Nadarzhynskyi and his descendants. Nadarzhynskyi was a rector of the Annunciation Cathedral in Moscow and for several years served as a confessor for Peter the Great. When the village was owned by the Nadarzhynskyi family, the Round Courtyard as well as the local Annunciation Church were built. The Round Courtyard was used as a performance center for circus and theater and housed several serf-actors. In 1783, the village was home to 1,217 serfs, as well as several dozen families of Cossacks, clergy, and merchants. The landowner built a brick factory, an oil mill, and a shop. By this time, the peasants of Trostianets had been completely reduced to serfdom. In 1832, a copper works owned by a landowner operated in Trostianets, producing stills and pipes. In the 1840s - 1860s, it was the property of the Galitzine family. From 1868 to 1874, the estate was owned by a St. Petersburg merchant. In 1874, Trostyanets was acquired by the great sugar producer Leopold Koenig. The last owner of the estate until 1917 was his son Julius.

In 1864, the future composer Pyotr Ilyich Tchaikovsky, during his student years, stayed at a villa in Trostyanets when composing his overture The Storm.

Starting from the 1830s, a number of industries were established in the village, including sugar production, beer brewing, production of nitrates, and many more.

Under the reform of 1861, 982 serfs and 48 household serfs were emancipated in Trostianets. They were required to redeem 2,519 desiatinas of land—much of it of poor quality—for which they had to pay a total of 130,513 rubles (including interest) over the course of 49 years. Rights to fishing and the use of pastures remained with the landowner. Deprived of access to essential lands and burdened by redemption payments, the peasants rapidly fell into destitution. The poorest among them sold their land allotments for a pittance and sought employment in industrial enterprises or with wealthy landowners. Even those peasants who attempted to farm their own land could not sustain themselves from it and were forced to seek seasonal wage labor elsewhere.

In 1877, a railroad was built passing the village of Trostyanets. By order of the Russian Minister of Railways, the Smorodyne locomotive depot was built in Trostyanets, and 12 steam locomotives were purchased. In 1893, the Trostyanets railway station was renamed Smorodyne.

During the years of the Stolypin reaction and the First World War, Trostianets remained a destitute village with a population of 8,000. The estate managers showed little concern for the health of the population. Apart from a small hospital, Trostianets had only a private two-bed hospital and a medical post at the Smorodyne railway station.

Public education was also at a low level. The zemstvo two-grade school, the church-parish school, a one-grade school, and a private school for university preparatory studies were unable to provide education for all school-aged children.

During the Ukrainian–Soviet War, on 12 January 1918, the village was occupied by the Russian Bolshevik forces, but already in April 1918 it was liberated. In December of 1918, the Russian Red forces returned, but on 7 August 1919, they were driven out by the Russian White forces of Anton Denikin.

The Soviet regime was firmly established on 4 December 1919, when the soldiers of the Soviet 41st Rifle Division headed by Yuriy Sablin captured the village.

A local newspaper began to be published in Trostyanets in 1930, and in the city after 1940.

On 12 July 1940, Trostyanets was granted administrative status as a city. During World War II, the city was occupied by Axis troops from October 1941 to August 1943.

During the Soviet period, Trostyanets was known for its factory "Elektropobutprylad" (literally, Electrical Appliance). Following the USSR's collapse, the leading enterprise in the city was the chocolate factory "Ukraina".

In January 1989, the population was 25,706 people.

=== 2022 Russian invasion of Ukraine ===
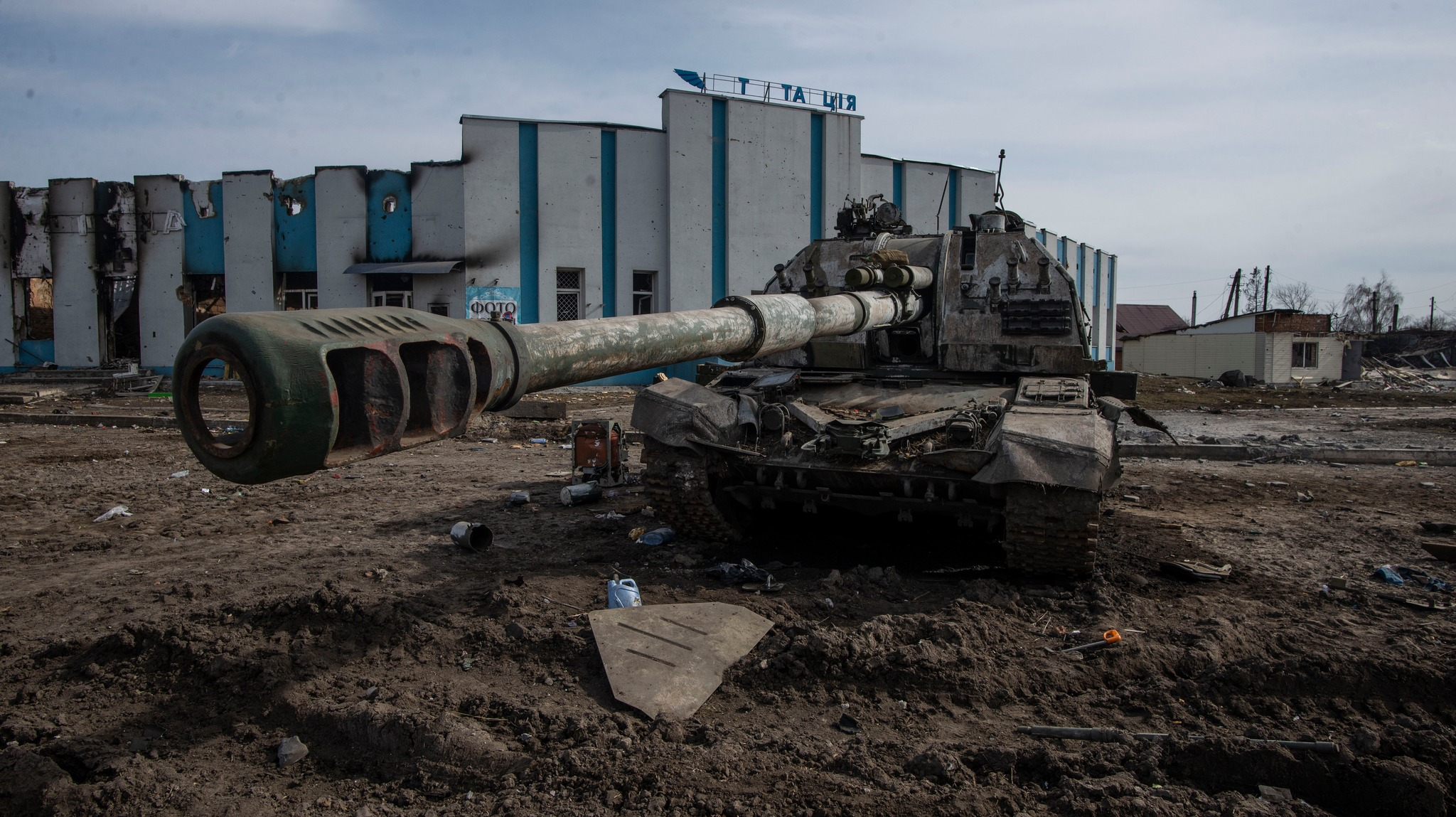
The consequences of the battles

During the Russian invasion of Ukraine, Trostyanets – strategically located between the larger settlements of Sumy and Kharkiv – was attacked by Russian forces shortly after the invasion was launched on 24 February and was captured by them on 1 March 2022. On 4 March 2022, an unfolding humanitarian catastrophe was reported by local authorities. Trostyanets was liberated by the Ukrainian 93rd Mechanized Brigade on 26 March. The city suffered major damage to its infrastructure during the fighting and a Ukrainian official said that the retreating Russian troops had mined a local hospital. The villa Tchaikovsky had stayed in was among buildings destroyed by the Russian troops.

The regional prosecutor's office in Sumy opened an investigation over evidence that Russian troops had thrown hand grenades at civilians protesting the Russian occupation of Trostyanets on 18 March.

After the city had been liberated, the British newspaper The Guardian found evidence of executions, torture and looting.

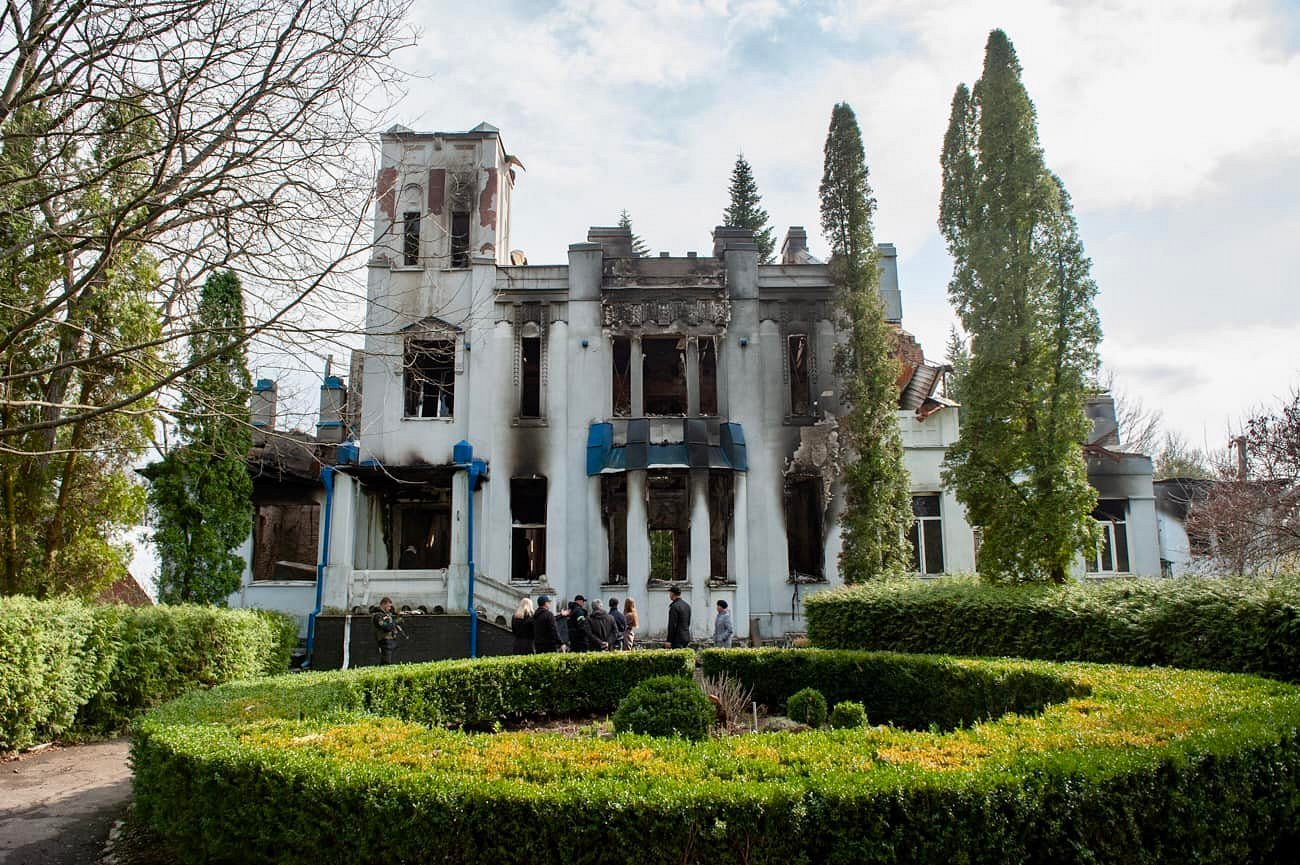
A forestry research station, located in a building built 1911 which is an architectural monument of national significance

During the fighting and shelling, the Krasnotrostyanets forest experimental station, located in the house of the manager of the estates of Leopold Koenig, was destroyed (an architectural monument of national significance). As a result of the fire, the chocolate factory "Ukraine" "Mondelēz International" (formerly "Kraft Foods") was partially destroyed. The estate of the Nadarzhinskys-Golitsyns, a monument in honor of the 183rd tank brigade, the Smorodino locomotive depot of 1877, and the shop of the merchant Fyodor Kurilo (1908, an architectural monument of local significance) were damaged.

The town's hospital was shelled many times by Russian forces (at least twice from tanks).

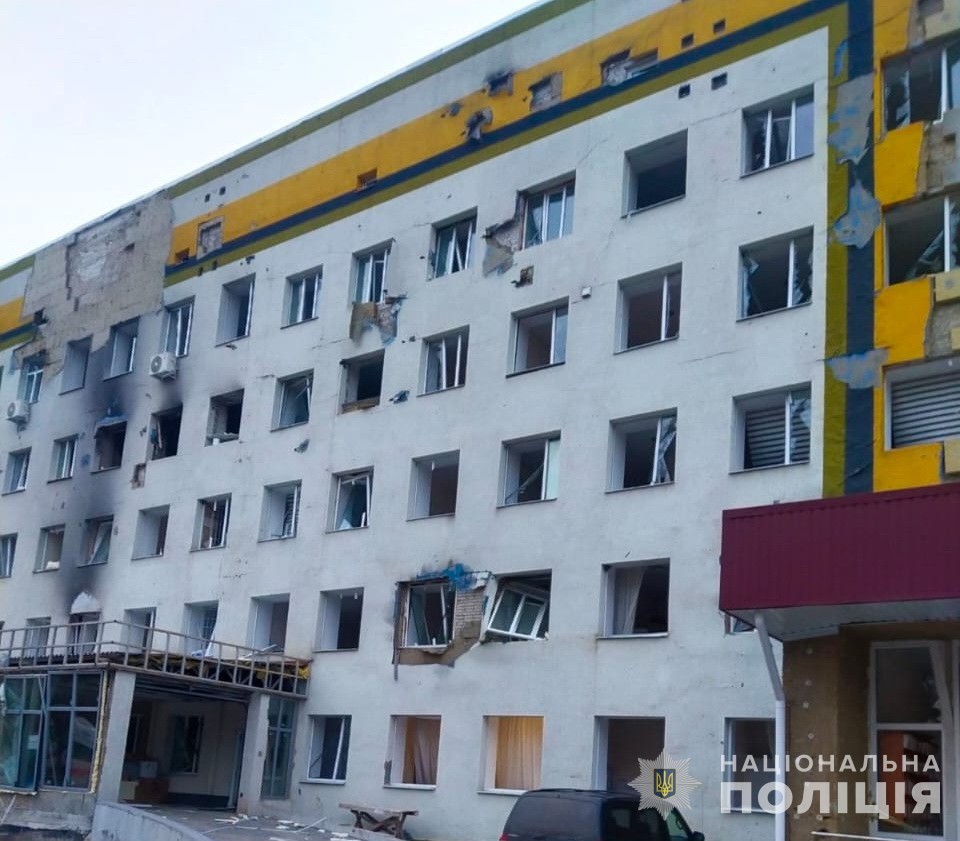
Trostyanets City Hospital after a missile attack on 14 March 2024

On 2 March 2024, a HESA Shahed 136 drone was shot down over Trostyanets, and residential buildings were damaged as a result of falling debris. On 14 March 2024, Trostyanets was shelled using the HESA Shahed 136 and 9K720 Iskander. As a result of the shelling, the Trostianets City Hospital was damaged.

== Population ==
=== Ethnicity ===
Distribution of the population by ethnicity according to the 2001 census:

Ethnic composition of Trostyanets
	percent
Ukrainians	89.03%
Russians	9.55%
Belarusians	0.36%
Gypsies	0.23%
others	0.24%

=== Language ===
Distribution of the population by native language according to the 2001 census:

Language	Percentage
Ukrainian	90.71%
Russian	8.48%
other/undecided	0.81%

== Nature and recreation ==
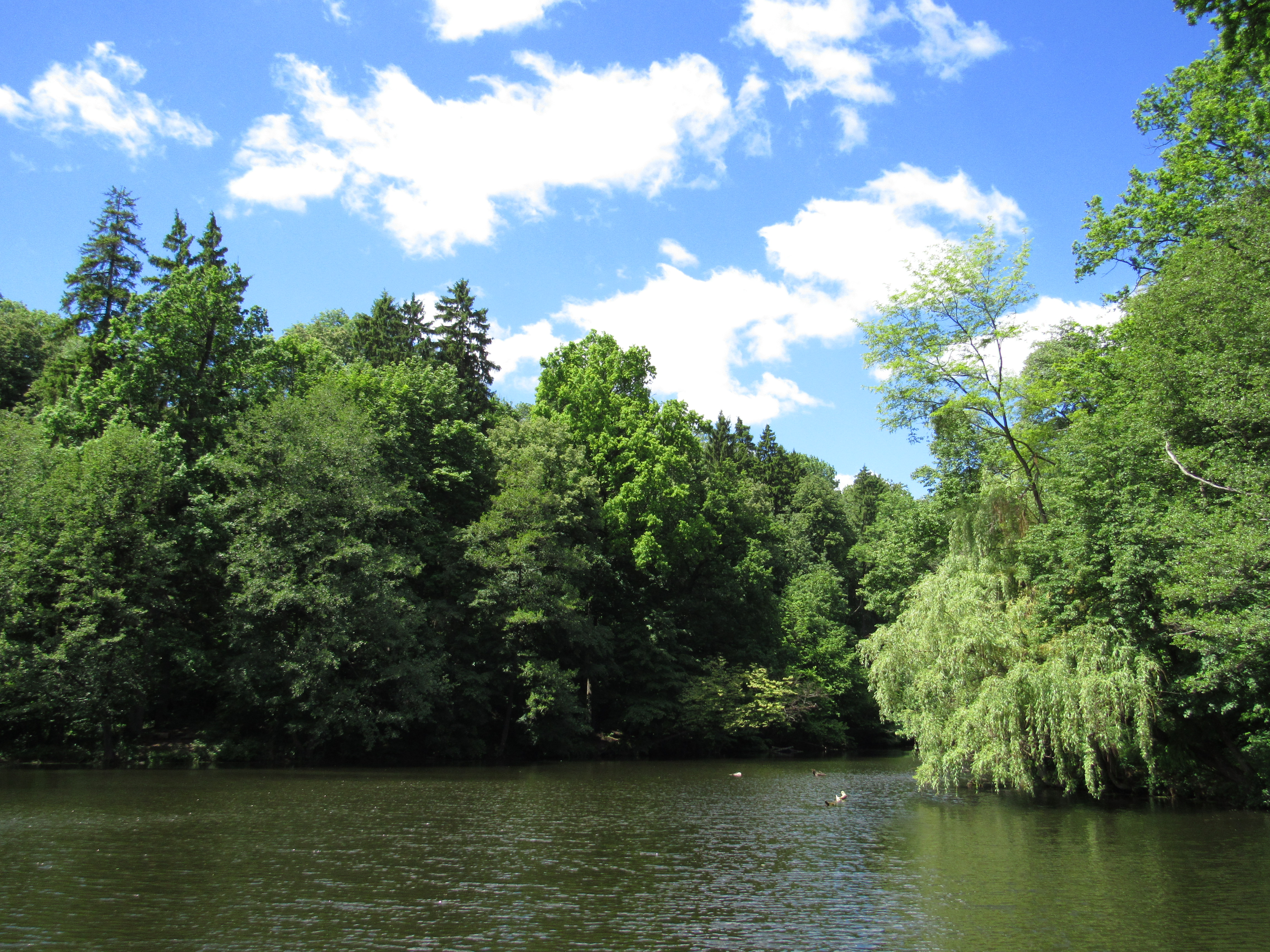
Neskuchne Park

Trostyanets is located near the picturesque Neskuchne tract, where there are three lakes among a mixed pine-deciduous forest. The nearby arboretum almost merged with the forest. In 1995–1996, a sports recreation center was destroyed, located in a pine forest near one of the lakes.

There are several architectural monuments in the city – the "Round Courtyard" of 1749, the Golitsyn Manor House, churches, the Grotto of the Nymphs of 1809 and others, which are gradually being repaired and restored. Recently, picturesque plein-airs "Picturesque Trostianechchyna" have been held in Trostyanets, as a result of which an exposition of paintings by artists from different countries was created in the former landowner's estate.

== Industry ==
The most famous enterprise of Trostyanets is the chocolate factory "Ukraine", one of the leading enterprises in the industry. This enterprise belongs to the company "Mondelēz International" (formerly "Kraft Foods"), which is known for its trademarks "Crown", "Alpen Gold", "Jacobs", "Tuc", "Barny" and Milka.

== Transport ==
The railway line Sumy–Liubotyn, stations Trostianets-Smorodyne and Rupyne. The national road N12 passes through the town and connects Sumy and Poltava.

== Sports ==
FC Trostianets is a football club based in the city, which made its debut in the Ukrainian Second League in the 2021–22 season. The team plays matches at the local Volodymyr Kuts Stadium, named after the Olympic champion Volodymyr Kuts (1927–1975), a native of Oleksyne, Trostyanets Raion.

== Notable people ==
- Mykola Khvylovy, Ukrainian writer, the theorist of Ukrainian national communism and the author of the slogan "Get away from Moscow!"
- Leonid Tatarenko, Ukrainian writer.
- Victor Dobrovolsky, scientist in the field of general mechanical engineering, teacher, rector of Odesa National Polytechnic University.
- Vasily Podgorny, founder of the Podgornovtsy sect.

== Gallery ==
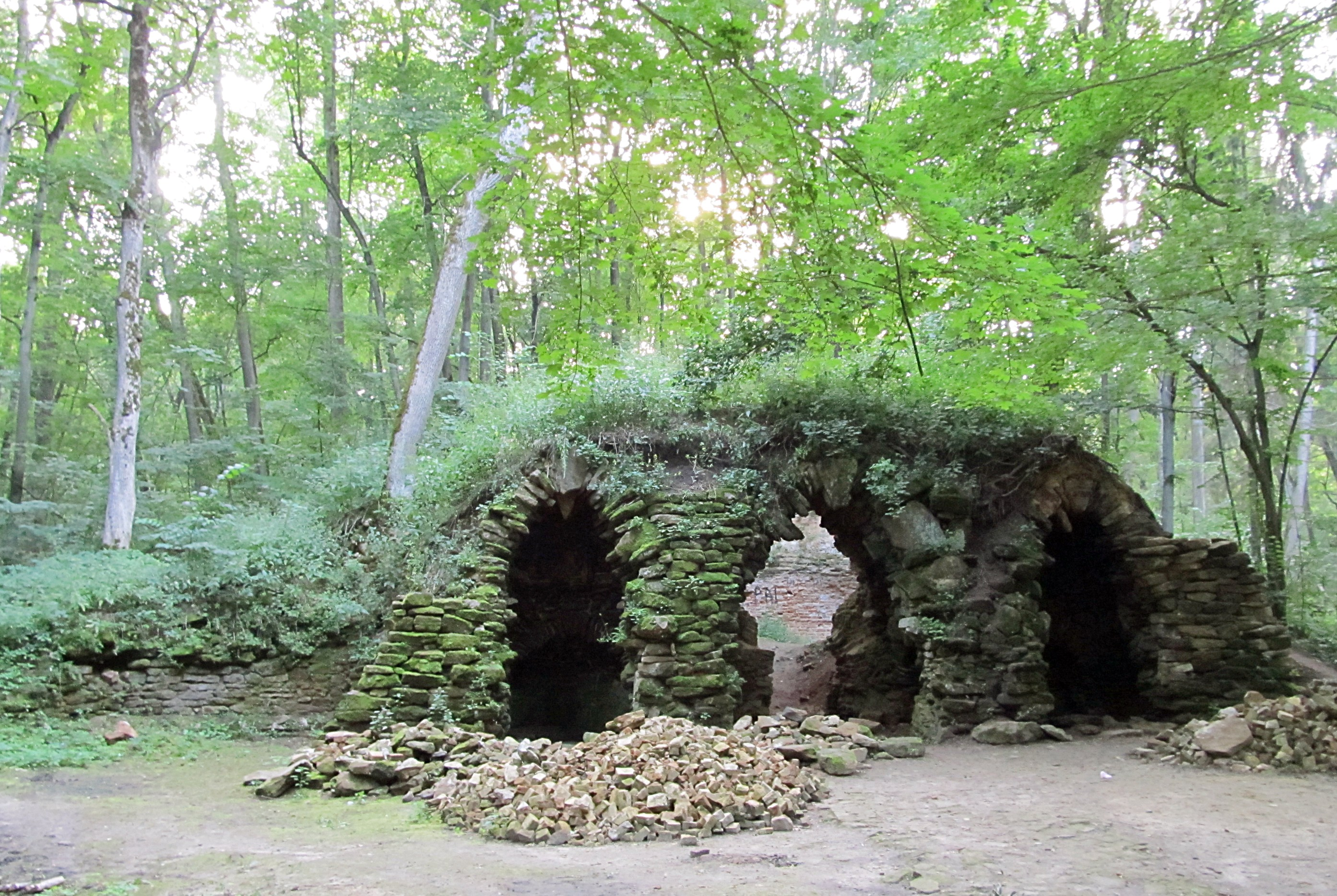
Ruins of the Grotto of the Nymphs

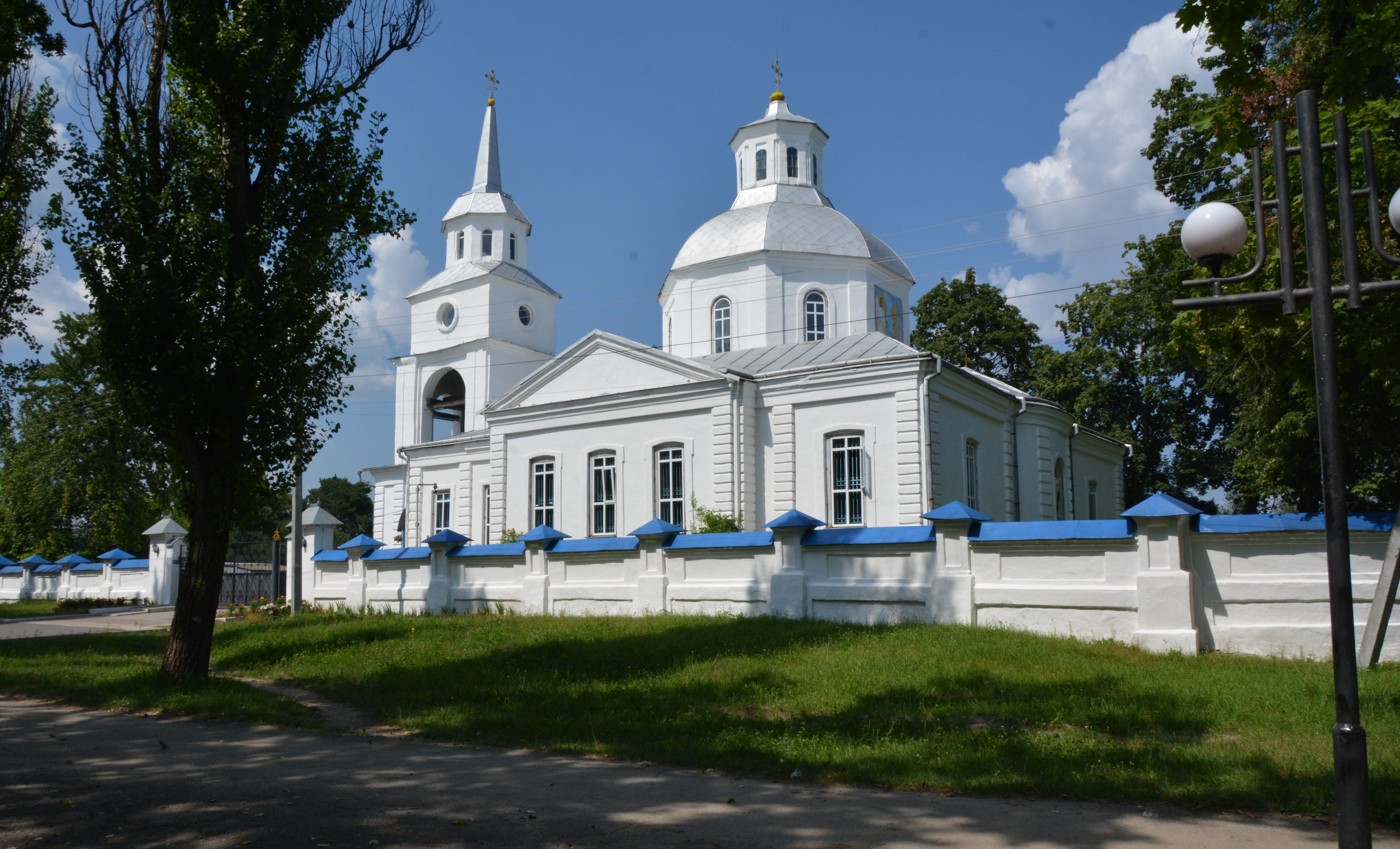
Church of the Annunciation

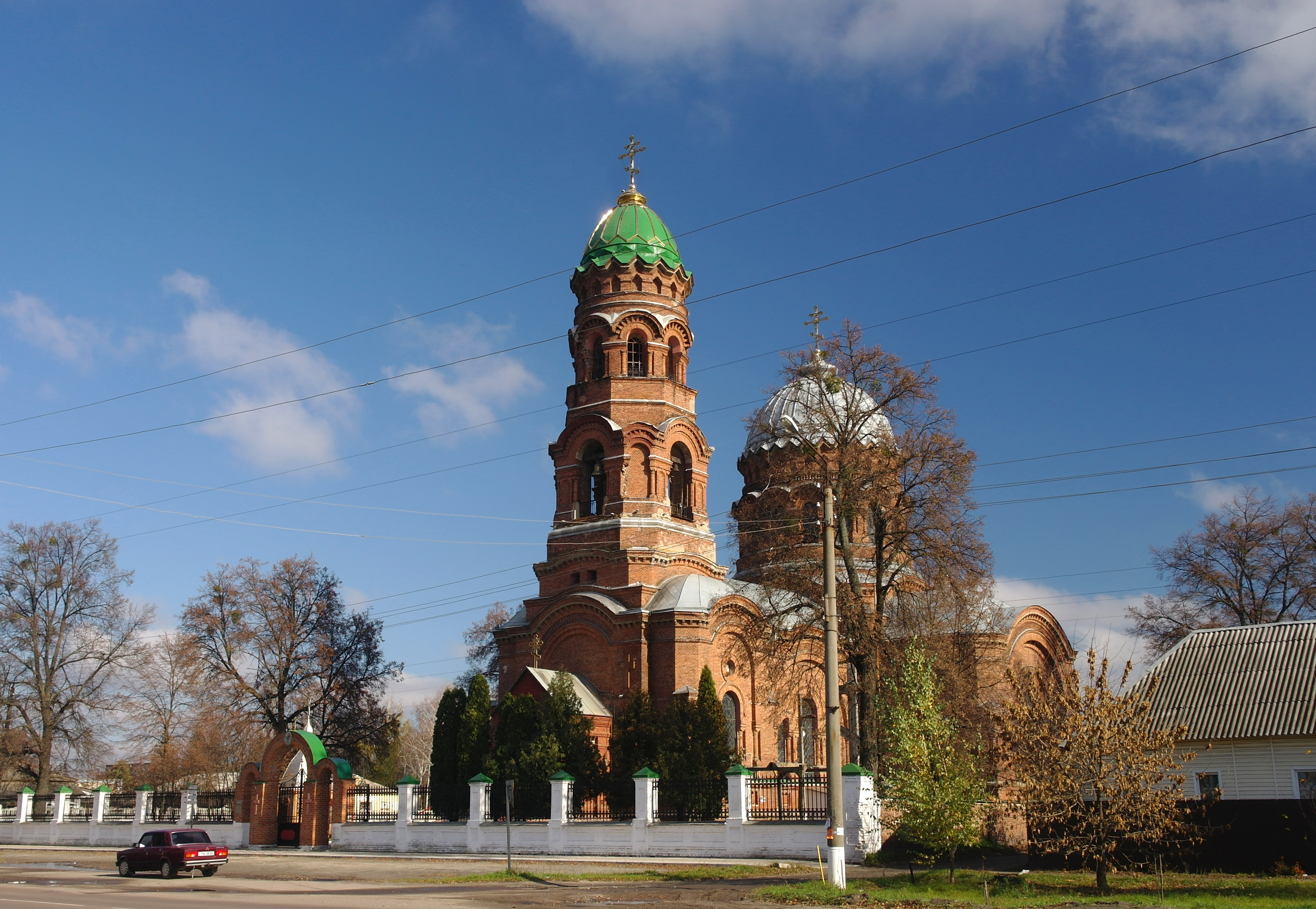
Ascension Church

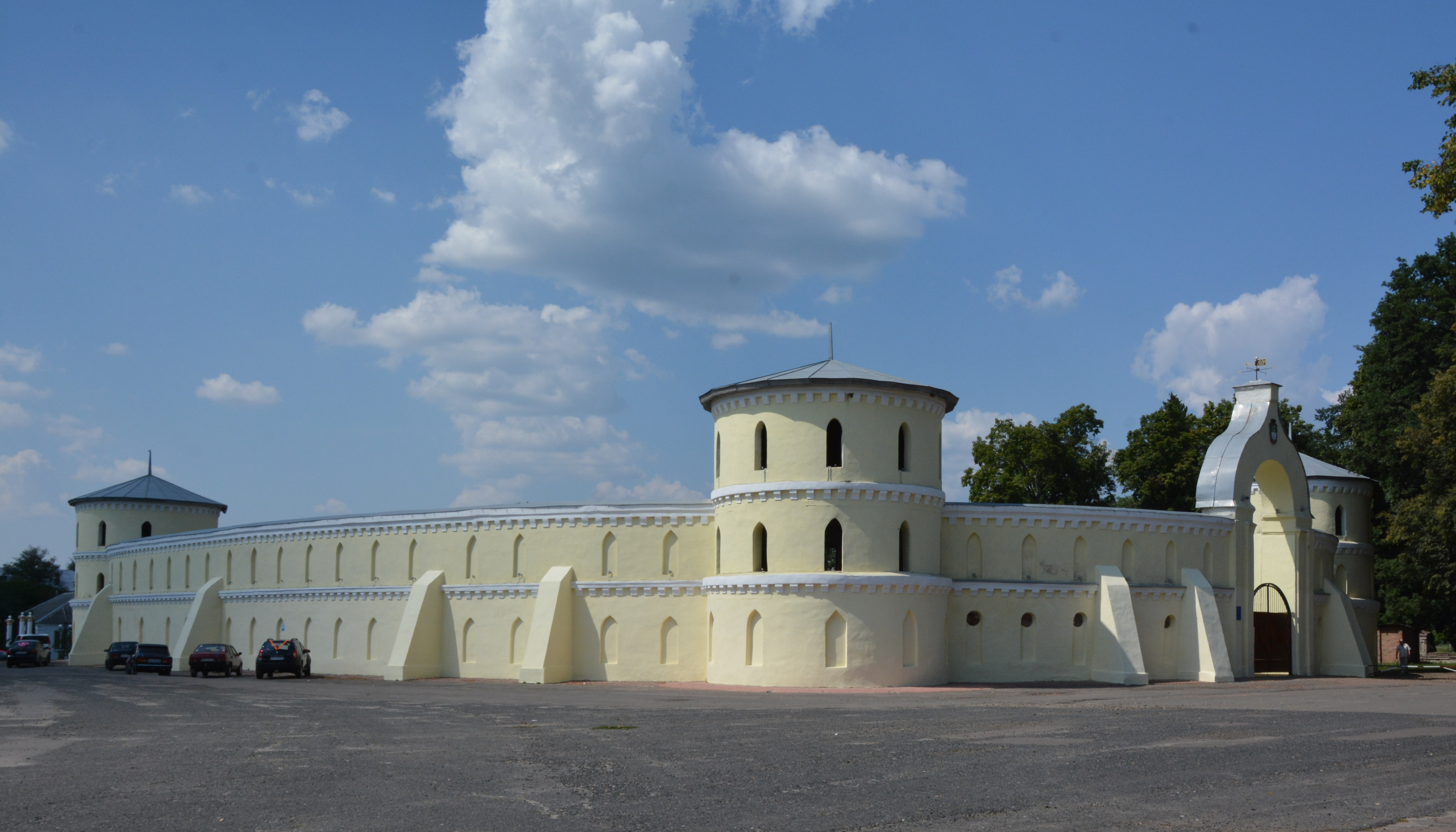
Round Courtyard

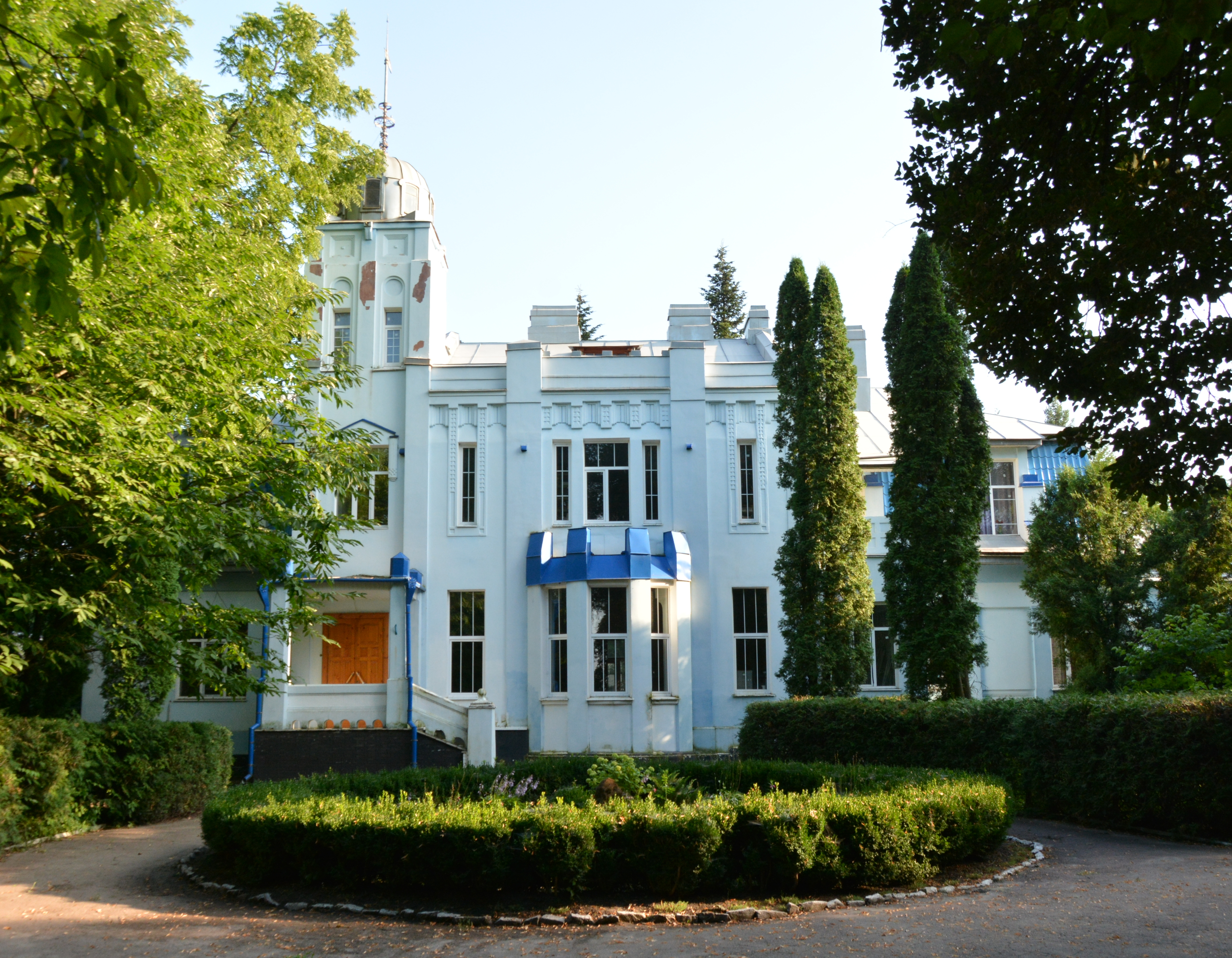
The house of the manager of the estates of Leopold Koenig in Trostianets Park, the location of the forest research station

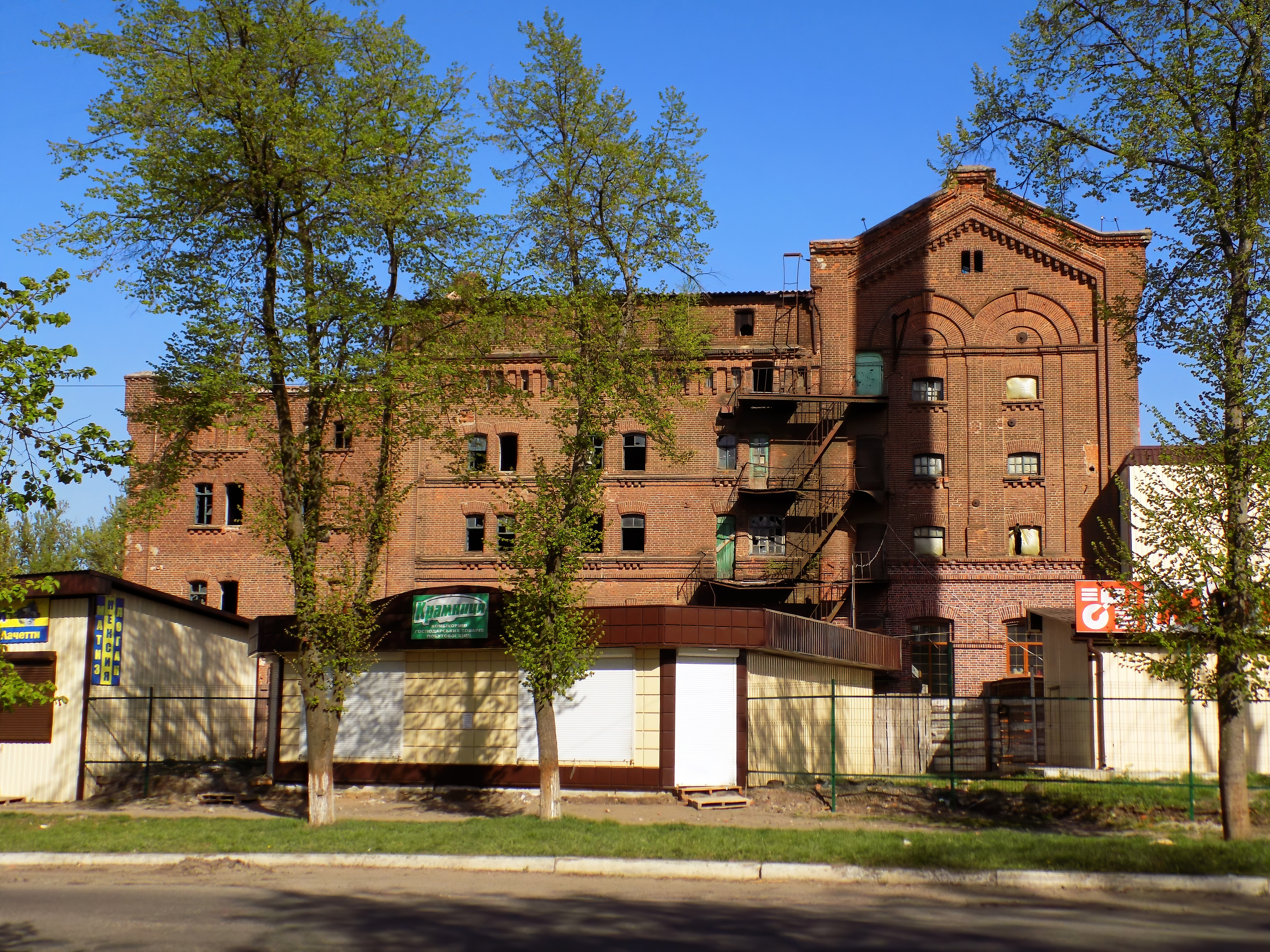
Leopold Koenig's economy rolling mill

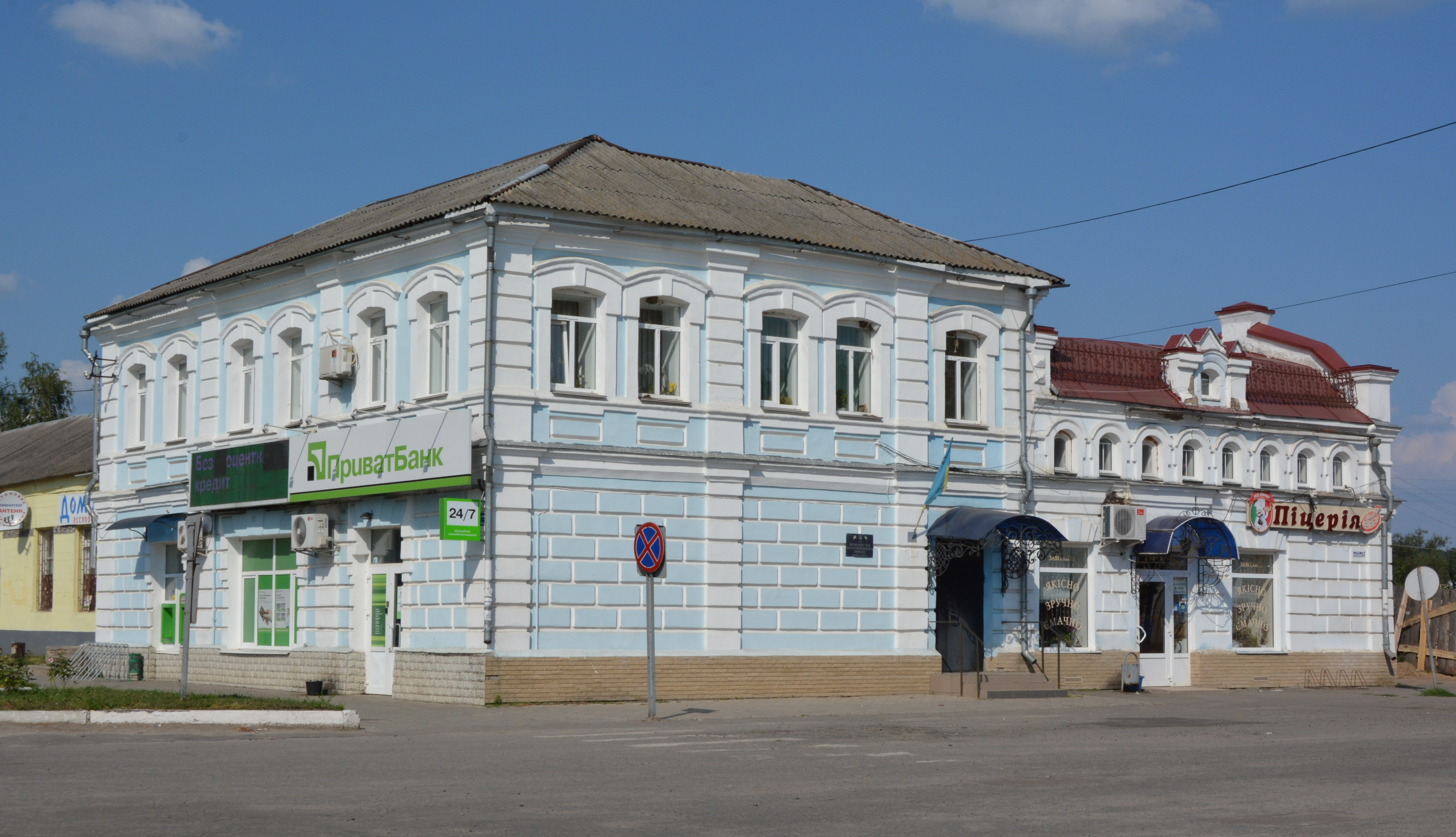
Shop of the merchant F. Kuril in the center of the town
