= Trostianets Raion =

Trostianets Raion (Ukrainian: Тростянецький район) may refer to:

- Trostianets Raion, Vinnytsia Oblast, a raion of Ukraine in Vinnytsia Oblast
- Trostianets Raion, Sumy Oblast, a raion of Ukraine in Sumy Oblast
