= Monuments of national significance in Sumy Oblast =

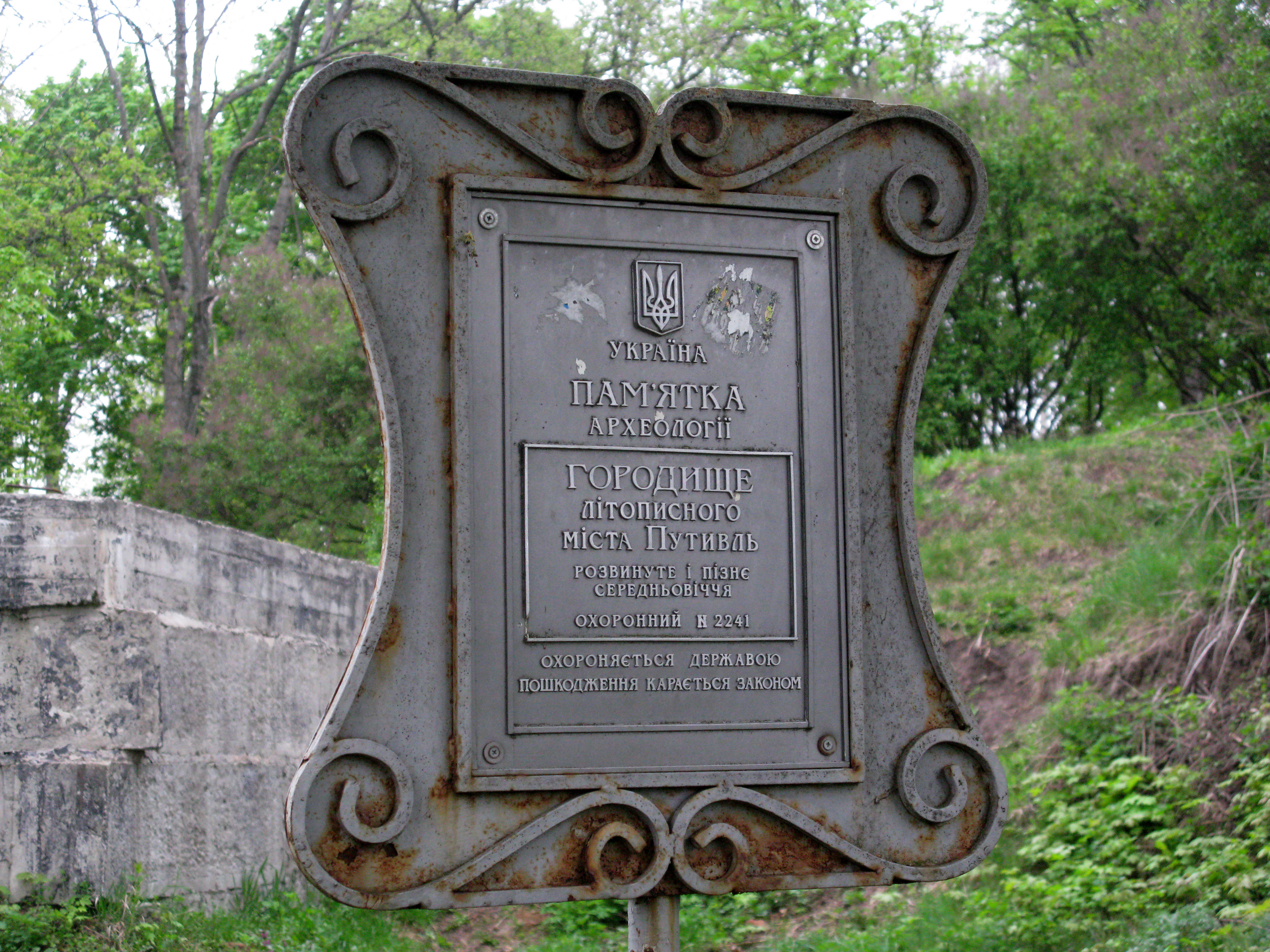
Cultural heritage plaque of the medieval hillfort in Putyvl

The State Register of Immovable Monuments of Ukraine classifies cultural heritage monuments as either of local or national significance. (Note: 'Monuments of national significance' may also be translated as 'monuments of national importance'; Ukrainian: пам'ятки національного значення) To be classified as nationally significant, a monument must have had a substantial impact on Ukraine's culture, been associated with major historical events or individuals who shaped national culture, represented a masterpiece of creative genius, or embodied a disappeared civilisation or disappeared artistic style. Monuments of national significance are inscribed on the register by the Cabinet of Ministers, and are protected and maintained by the Ministry of Culture. All listed monuments belong to at least one of the following categories: archaeology, history, monumental art, architecture, urban planning, garden and park art, landscape, or science and technology. (Note: The categories are defined as such: Archaeological monuments are underground or underwater remains of human activity that bear testimony to the origin or development of civilisation.; Historic monuments are buildings, structures, burials, and other sites associated with important historical events or the lives and activities of prominent individuals.; Monuments of monumental art are works of fine art.; Architectural monuments are buildings and structures that retain full or partial authenticity and express characteristics of a particular culture, era, style, construction technique, or represent works of renowned architects.; Urban planning monuments are historic neighbourhoods, streets, squares, or ensembles with preserved spatial layouts and architectural integrity.; Monuments of garden and park art combine park construction with natural or anthropogenic landscapes.; Landscape monuments are natural areas possessing historical value.; Monuments of science and technology are industrial, engineering, or scientific sites that reflect the scientific and technological development of an era or discipline.)

The first attempts to establish registers of protected buildings were undertaken in 1917 and 1918 by the Ukrainian People's Republic. These efforts continued in the 1920s in Soviet Ukraine, culminating in the listing of thousands of monuments, but were halted in the 1930s with the dissolution of relevant institutions and the active destruction of cultural—particularly religious—heritage. The listing of cultural heritage monuments in the region was renewed in 1956. A list of architectural monuments was approved in 1963, followed by a separate list of artistic, historic, and archaeological monuments in 1965. Both lists remained in use after Ukraine declared independence in 1991. On 8 June 2000, the State Register of Immovable Monuments was established with the adoption of the law On the Protection of Cultural Heritage. All entries from the Soviet-era list of artistic, historic, and archaeological monuments were transferred to the new register on 14 September 2009. The transfer of monuments from the Soviet architectural register, however, has proceeded more slowly and remains incomplete as of 2026, although the process has accelerated in recent years. At the same time, a number of sites have been deprived of their protected status to comply with decommunisation and derussification laws in effect since 2015 and 2023, respectively.

Sumy Oblast is located in northeastern Ukraine and contains 81 monuments of national significance. (Note: No monuments of national significance in the oblast remain on the Soviet-era register.) It is divided into five raions (districts) – Konotop, Okhtyrka, Romny, Shostka, and Sumy – which include 16, 17, 22, 16, and 10 monuments of national significance, respectively. Of the total, 52 are classified as architectural monuments, 20 as archaeological, 14 as historic, 5 as monumental art, 4 as urban planning, and 1 as garden and park art, with 13 monuments belonging to multiple categories. Most of the architectural monuments date from the 17th to the 19th centuries. The latest inscriptions date to October 2023. One monument—Hlukhiv Teachers' Institute—is listed twice. St Paraskeva Church in Bakyrivka remains on the register despite its complete destruction due to a fire in 2015.

== Konotop Raion ==
Monuments of national significance in Konotop Raion
Name (Note: The names listed are unofficial translations as the register is only available in Ukrainian. The official Ukrainian names are shown below each translation, with links to the corresponding Ukrainian Wikipedia articles if applicable.)	Location	Date constructed (Note: Datings of the monuments as indicated on the register)	Date designated (Note: For monuments previously listed on a Soviet-era register, the date of transfer to the modern register is indicated.)	Coordinates	Type	Protection number (Note: Every monument is assigned a unique protection number, and those of national significance located in Sumy Oblast start with the digits 18.)	Photo	Ref.
Hillfort and settlement Городище і селище	Dych	9th–13th centuries	14 September 2009	51.24733°N 33.87155°E	Archaeological	180005-Н		
Mass grave and memorial to the victims of the 1932–1933 Holodomor Братська могила і місце вшанування пам'яті жертв голодомору 1932-1933 років	Pisky	1932–1933, 2007	14 September 2009	51.21556°N 34.04804°E	Historic	180006-Н	More images	
Hillfort of the legendary city of Putyvl Городище літописного міста Путивля	Putyvl	9th–13th centuries	14 September 2009	51.33003°N 33.86286°E	Archaeological	180019-Н	More images	
Monument complex in Spadshchanskyi Forest – the organisation centre of the partisan unit led by commander S. A. Kovpak and commissar S. V. Rudniev Комплекс пам'яток у Спадщанському лісі - центрі організації партизанського з'єднання на чолі з командиром С. А. Ковпаком і комісаром С. В. Руднєвим	Putyvl	1941–1945	14 September 2009	51.35949°N 33.75607°E	Historic	180020-Н	More images	
St Nicholas Church (Church of Nicholas Velykoritskyi) Миколаївська церква (Церква Миколи Великоріцького)	Putyvl	1735–1770	18 October 2023	51.33521°N 33.85861°E	Architectural	180037	More images	
Saviour-Transfiguration Cathedral and bell tower (Holy Spirit Cathedral, Exaltation of the Holy Cross Gate Church-Bell Tower) Спасо-Преображенський собор та дзвіниця (Святодухівський собор, Хрестовоздвиженська надбрамна церква-дзвіниця)	Putyvl	1617–1698, 1697–1754	18 October 2023	51.33986°N 33.86756°E	Architectural, urban planning	180038	More images	
Movche Monastery Мовчанський монастир	Putyvl	Late 16th–19th centuries	18 October 2023	51.32559°N 33.87558°E	Architectural, urban planning	180039	More images	
Cathedral of Sts Florus and Laurus (Cathedral of the Nativity of the Blessed Theotokos) Собор Флора і Лавра (Собор Різдва Пресвятої Богородиці)	Putyvl	1602 – late 19th century	18 October 2023	51.32545°N 33.87588°E	Architectural	180039/1	More images	
Bell tower Дзвіниця	Putyvl	1602–1700	18 October 2023	51.32578°N 33.87526°E	Architectural	180039/2	More images	
Walls, towers, and gates (Defensive wall with the corner gate) Мури, башти та брами (Оборонний мур з наріжною брамою)	Putyvl	1602	18 October 2023	51.32615°N 33.87581°E	Architectural	180039/3	More images	
Field of the battle between Cossack troops headed by I. Vyhovsky and the Tsarist army Поле битви між козацькими військами на чолі з І. Виговським і царською армією	Shapovalivka (Note: The location is erroneously identified as the city of Konotop on the register.)	1659	14 September 2009	51.13802°N 33.19181°E	Historic	180009-Н	More images	
Hillfort Городище	Shyriaieve	9th century BCE – 4th century CE	14 September 2009	51.30073°N 34.00536°E	Archaeological	180021-Н	More images	
Hillfort Городище	Spaske (Note: Mentioned on the register under its pre-2016 name Leninske)	9th–13th centuries	14 September 2009	51.44646°N 33.27029°E	Archaeological	180012-Н		
Hillfort and settlement Городище і селище	Velykyi Sambir	9th–13th centuries	14 September 2009	51.04788°N 33.16703°E	Archaeological	180010-Н		
Golden Gates Брама "Золоті ворота"	Volokytyne	Early 19th century, 1875	18 October 2023	51.45911°N 33.80604°E	Architectural	180040	More images	
Hillfort – remains of the legendary city of Vorhol Городище - залишки літописного міста Воргола	Vorhol	9th–13th centuries	14 September 2009	51.44237°N 33.72341°E	Archaeological	180011-Н		

== Okhtyrka Raion ==
Monuments of national significance in Okhtyrka Raion
Name	Location	Date constructed	Date designated	Coordinates	Type	Protection number	Photo	Ref.
St Paraskeva Church (Note: St Paraskeva Church in Bakyrivka burned down in 2015 as a result of a lightning strike. The second image shows the view of the site as of 2024.) П'ятницька церква	Bakyrivka	19th century	18 October 2023	50.38861°N 35.02562°E	Architectural	180045	More images	
Hillfort Городище	Kamianka	9th century BCE – 4th century CE	14 September 2009	50.42935°N 35.03754°E	Archaeological	180028-Н	More images	
Hillfort and settlement Городище і селище	Kuzemyn	9th–13th centuries	14 September 2009	50.13910°N 34.67937°E	Archaeological	180017-Н	More images	
Fortifications of the Bilsk hillfort Укріплення Більського городища	Kuzemyn	9th century BCE – 4th century CE	14 September 2009	50.13284°N 34.63075°E	Archaeological	180018-Н	More images	
Archaeological complex: hillforts (2), settlement, and kurgan cemetery Археологічний комплекс: городища (2), селище і курганний могильник	Nytsakha	9th–13th centuries	14 September 2009	50.45962°N 35.19229°E	Archaeological	180029-Н		
Intercession Cathedral Покровський собор	Okhtyrka	1753–1768	18 October 2023	50.29969°N 34.89023°E	Architectural	180041	More images	
Presentation Church-Bell Tower Введенська церква-дзвіниця	Okhtyrka	1786	18 October 2023	50.29981°N 34.88937°E	Architectural	180042	More images	
Exaltation Church (Church of the Nativity of Christ) Здвиженська церква (Церква Різдва Христового)	Okhtyrka	1774, 1825	18 October 2023	50.29935°N 34.89064°E	Architectural	180043	More images	
Archangel Michael Church (St Michael's Church) Михайло-Архангельська церква (Михайлівська церква)	Okhtyrka	2nd half of the 19th century, 1884	18 October 2023	50.33595°N 34.90935°E	Architectural	180044	More images	
Palace (Main building) Палац (Головний будинок)	Trostianets	Late 18th century, 1872	18 October 2023	50.47444°N 34.95776°E	Architectural	180046	More images	
Manège-circus (Round Court) Манеж-цирк (Круглий двір)	Trostianets	1820s	18 October 2023	50.47378°N 34.95761°E	Architectural	180047	More images	
"Neskuchne" Park (Palace in Neskuchne) Парк "Нескучне" (Палац в Нескучному)	Trostianets	1820s	18 October 2023	50.47488°N 34.91948°E	Architectural	180048	More images	
Grotto (Grotto in Neskuchne Tract, Grotto of the Nymphs) Грот (Грот в урочищі Нескучне, Грот "Німф")	Trostianets	1820s	18 October 2023	50.47472°N 34.91635°E	Architectural	180049	More images	
Ascension Church Вознесенська церква	Trostianets	Early 20th century, 1903–1913	18 October 2023	50.46457°N 34.95445°E	Architectural	180050	More images	
Church (Annunciation Church) Церква (Благовіщенська церква)	Trostianets	1744–1750	18 October 2023	50.47436°N 34.96084°E	Architectural	180051	More images	
Archaeological complex: hillforts (2), settlements (2), and kurgan cemetery Археологічний комплекс: городища (2), селища (2) і курганний могильник	Zhuravne	9th–13th centuries	14 September 2009	50.26252°N 34.77907°E	Archaeological	180016-Н		

== Romny Raion ==
Monuments of national significance in Romny Raion
Name	Location	Date constructed	Date designated	Coordinates	Type	Protection number	Photo	Ref.
Hillfort and kurgan cemetery Городище і курганний могильник	Basivka	9th century BCE – 4th century CE	14 September 2009	50.82507°N 33.56095°E	Archaeological	180024-Н	More images	
Hillfort of the legendary city of Popash Городище літописного міста Попаша	Brodok, Zasullia	9th–13th centuries	14 September 2009	50.85642°N 33.87389°E	Archaeological	180014-Н	More images	
Hillfort of the legendary city of Viakhan Городище літописного міста В'яханя	Horodyshche	9th–13th centuries	14 September 2009	50.92638°N 34.00448°E	Archaeological	180013-Н	More images	
Monument at the site of the first discovery of mammoth bones in Ukraine Пам'ятник на місці першої в Україні знахідки кісток мамонта	Kulishivka	1839, 1841	14 September 2009	50.86766°N 33.83074°E	Historic, monumental art	180015-Н	More images	
Church (St Nicholas Church) Церква (Миколаївська церква)	Pustoviitivka	Early 20th century	18 October 2023	50.77862°N 33.56740°E	Architectural	180055	More images	
Monument to the poet T. H. Shevchenko Пам'ятник поету Т. Г. Шевченку	Romny	1918, 1982	14 September 2009	50.75085°N 33.48598°E	Monumental art	180022-Н	More images	
Multilayered hillfort Городище багатошарове	Romny	9th century BCE – 4th century CE, 9th–13th centuries	14 September 2009	50.75725°N 33.50140°E	Archaeological	180023-Н	More images	
Holy Spirit Cathedral Святодухівський собор	Romny	1689	18 October 2023	50.74442°N 33.49430°E	Architectural	180052	More images	
St Basil's Winter Church Василівська тепла церква	Romny	1751, 1867	18 October 2023	50.74477°N 33.49438°E	Architectural	180053	More images	
Ascension Church and bell tower Вознесенська церква та дзвіниця	Romny	1795–1895	18 October 2023	50.74627°N 33.48599°E	Architectural	180054	More images	

== Shostka Raion ==
Monuments of national significance in Shostka Raion
Name	Location	Date constructed	Date designated	Coordinates	Type	Protection number	Photo	Ref.
Ensemble of the Hamaliivka Monastery Ансамбль Гамаліївського монастиря	Hamaliivka	17th–18th centuries	18 October 2023	51.84334°N 33.57402°E	Architectural, urban planning	180065	More images	
Cathedral of the Nativity of the Theotokos of the Hamaliivka Monastery Собор Різдва Богородиці Гамаліївського монастиря	Hamaliivka	1719–1735	18 October 2023	51.84301°N 33.57421°E	Architectural	180065/1	More images	
St Charalampus Church of the Hamaliivka Monastery Харлампіївська церква Гамаліївського монастиря	Hamaliivka	1714–1722	18 October 2023	51.84359°N 33.57406°E	Architectural	180065/2	More images	
Cells of the Hamaliivka Monastery Келії Гамаліївського монастиря	Hamaliivka	1781–1794	18 October 2023	51.84246°N 33.57385°E	Architectural	180065/3	More images	
Defensive wall of the Hamaliivka Monastery Оборонний мур Гамаліївського монастиря	Hamaliivka	1781–1794	18 October 2023	51.84342°N 33.57351°E	Architectural	180065/4	More images	
Hlukhiv Teachers' Institute building Будинок Глухівського учительського інституту	Hlukhiv	1874	14 September 2009	51.67860°N 33.91647°E	Historic	180007-Н	More images	
Kyiv Gate of Hlukhiv city fortifications Київська брама Глухівських міських укріплень	Hlukhiv	1766–1769	19 October 2012	51.67731°N 33.90453°E	Architectural, historic	180030-Н	More images	
Humanitarian and educational complex Гуманітарно-просвітницький комплекс	Hlukhiv	1874–1892	19 October 2012	51.67872°N 33.91554°E	Architectural, historic	180031-Н	More images	
Hlukhiv Teachers' Institute Глухівський учительський інститут	Hlukhiv	1874–1879	19 October 2012	51.67536°N 33.91345°E	Architectural, historic	180031-Н/1	More images	
Hlukhiv Men's Gymnasium Глухівська чоловіча гімназія	Hlukhiv	1880s	19 October 2012	51.67819°N 33.91578°E	Architectural, historic	180031-Н/2	More images	
Boarding house of Hlukhiv Men's Gymnasium Пансіон Глухівської чоловічої гімназії	Hlukhiv	1880–1892	19 October 2012	51.67859°N 33.91571°E	Architectural, historic	180031-Н/3	More images	
St Nicholas Church Миколаївська церква	Hlukhiv	1693–1695	19 October 2012	51.67642°N 33.90969°E	Architectural, historic	180032-Н	More images	
St Anastasia Church Церква Трьох-Анастасіївська	Hlukhiv	1884–1893	19 October 2012	51.67524°N 33.91198°E	Architectural, historic, monumental art	180033-Н	More images	
Saviour-Transfiguration Church Спасо-Преображенська церква	Hlukhiv	1765	19 October 2012	51.67536°N 33.91345°E	Architectural, historic	180034-Н	More images	
Intercession Church and bell tower Покровська церква та дзвіниця	Pyrohivka	18th century, 1777, 19th century	18 October 2023	51.91387°N 33.29150°E	Architectural	180066	More images	
St Michael's Church Михайлівська церква	Voronizh	1781	18 October 2023	51.77757°N 33.46332°E	Architectural	180064	More images	
Hillfort and settlement Городище і селище	Yemadychyne (Note: Mentioned on the register under its pre-2025 name Yemadykyne)	9th–13th century	14 September 2009	51.52878°N 34.16436°E	Archaeological	180008-Н		

== Sumy Raion ==
Monuments of national significance in Sumy Raion
Name	Location	Date constructed	Date designated	Coordinates	Type	Protection number	Photo	Ref.
Hillfort of the legendary city of Vyr Городище літописного міста Вира	Bilopillia	9th–13th centuries	14 September 2009	51.15009°N 34.30914°E	Archaeological	180003-Н	More images	
House where the poet and scientist Oleksandr Oles (O. Kandyba) was born Будинок, у якому народився поет і вчений Олександр Олесь (О. Кандиба)	Bilopillia	2nd half of the 19th century	14 September 2009	51.15094°N 34.32062°E	Historic	180004-Н	More images	
Hillforts (2) and settlement Городища (2) і селище	Bytytsia	9th century BCE – 4th century CE, 5th–9th centuries	14 September 2009	51.01693°N 34.96856°E	Archaeological	180025-Н	More images	
Manor house (Outbuilding of Count Kamburlei Estate) Садибний будинок (Флігель садиби графа Камбурлея)	Khotin	18th–19th centuries	18 October 2023	51.08268°N 34.78553°E	Architectural	180062	More images	
Manor house Садибний будинок	Kuianivka	1814	18 October 2023	51.07128°N 34.21108°E	Architectural	180059	More images	
Palace and park Палац та парк	Kyianytsia	Late 19th century	18 October 2023	51.07258°N 34.90761°E	Architectural, garden and park art, urban planning	180061	More images	
Resurrection Church Воскресенська церква	Lebedyn	1748	18 October 2023	50.59835°N 34.48296°E	Architectural	180056	More images	
Hillfort, settlement and grave field Городище, селище і могильник	Shpylivka	9th–13th centuries	14 September 2009	50.77183°N 34.68010°E	Archaeological	180027-Н	More images	
Monument at the Kharytonenko family grave Пам'ятник на родинному похованні Харитоненків	Sumy	1894	14 September 2009	50.89267°N 34.78247°E	Monumental art	180001-Н	More images	
Monument at the grave of Zinaida, the daughter of P. I. Kharytonenko Пам'ятник на могилі доньки П. І. Харитоненка - Зінаїди	Sumy	1891	14 September 2009	50.89263°N 34.78247°E	Monumental art	180002-Н	More images	
Sts Peter and Paul Church Петропавлівська церква	Sumy	1851	18 October 2023	50.89275°N 34.78261°E	Architectural	180035	More images	
St Pantaleon Church Пантелеймонівська церква	Sumy	1915	18 October 2023	50.90082°N 34.77084°E	Architectural	180036	More images	
Main building of the Shterycheva Manor in Basy (Note: The location is erroneously identified as the village of Basivka on the register.) Головний будинок садиби Штеричевої в Басах	Sumy	Late 19th – early 20th centuries	18 October 2023	50.87565°N 34.81808°E	Architectural	180060	More images	
Saviour-Transfiguration Cathedral Спасо-Преображенський собор	Sumy	1776–1892	18 October 2023	50.90920°N 34.80061°E	Architectural	180067	More images	
St Elijah's Church Іллінська церква	Sumy	1836–1851	18 October 2023	50.91113°N 34.79191°E	Architectural	180068	More images	
Resurrection Church Воскресенська церква	Sumy	1702	18 October 2023	50.91182°N 34.80084°E	Architectural	180069	More images	
Trinity Cathedral Троїцький собор	Sumy	1901–1914	18 October 2023	50.91725°N 34.81647°E	Architectural	180070	More images	
Bell tower of the Resurrection Church Дзвіниця Воскресенської церкви	Sumy	1906	18 October 2023	50.91204°N 34.80080°E	Architectural	180071	More images	
Trinity Church Троїцька церква	Slavhorod	1807	18 October 2023	50.59023°N 35.35602°E	Architectural	180058	More images	
Resurrection Church Воскресенська церква	Velykyi Bobryk	1822–1851	18 October 2023	50.76572°N 35.02267°E	Architectural	180057	More images	
St Nicholas Church Миколаївська церква	Yunakivka	1793–1806	18 October 2023	51.12311°N 35.03591°E	Architectural	180063	More images	
Hillfort, settlement, and grave field Городище, селище і могильник	Zelenyi Hai	9th–13th centuries	14 September 2009	50.97240°N 34.85496°E	Archaeological	180026-Н	More images	

== See also ==
- List of historic reserves in Ukraine
- Ukrainian architecture
