= Horikhove, Kharkiv Raion =

Village in Kharkiv Oblast, Ukraine

Horikhove Горіхове
- Village
- Interactive map of Horikhove
- Location of Horikhove Horikhove (Ukraine)
- Coordinates: 49°59′59″N 35°51′15″E
- Country: Ukraine
- Oblast: Kharkiv Oblast
- Raion: Kharkiv Raion
- Hromada: Liubotyn urban hromada
- Founded: 1750

Government
  - Mayor: Vitaliy Palahuta

Area
  - Total: 0.12 km^{2} (0.046 sq mi)

Population (2001)
  - Total: 74
  - Density: 620/km^{2} (1,600/sq mi)
- Postal code: 62450

Horikhove (Ukrainian: Горіхове) is a village in Kharkiv Oblast, Ukraine. It belongs to the Liubotyn urban hromada since 2020.

== History ==
The village Horikhove was founded in 1750. Before World War II, it was named Khrystosy.

Before 1927, the villages Hukivka, Bezrukiv, Sknarine, and Khrystosy were part of V'azove-Hukivka urban soviet. Before 1967, the village Khrystosy, now named Horikhove, belonged to the Protopopivka urban soviet. In 2020, the village was implemented into the Liubotyn urban hromada.

== Geography ==
Horikhove village is located 0.5 km from the settlement Myshchenky and 1 km from the settlement Udarne. A forest, mainly from oak or pine, surrounds the village.

The village is populated by only 74 people according to the 2001 Ukrainian census.
