= Liubotyn urban hromada =

Liubotyn urban hromada Люботинська міська громада
- Hromada
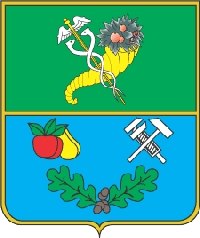
- Seal
- Interactive map of Liubotyn urban hromada
- Country: Ukraine
- Oblast: Kharkiv
- Raion: Kharkiv

Area
  - Total: 138.0 km^{2} (53.3 sq mi)

Population (2020)
  - Total: 27,484
  - Density: 199.2/km^{2} (515.8/sq mi)
- Settlements: 15
- Cities: 1
- Rural settlements: 9
- Villages: 5

Liubotyn urban hromada (Ukrainian: Люботинська міська громада) is a hromada of Ukraine, located in Kharkiv Raion, Kharkiv Oblast. Its administrative center is the city Liubotyn.

It has an area of 138.0 square kilometres (53.3 mi^{2}) and a population of 27,484, as of 2020.

The hromada contains 15 settlements: 1 city (Liubotyn), 5 villages (Horikhove, Huryne, Myshchenky, Nesterenky, and Smorodske), and 9 rural settlements:

- Bairak
- Barchany
- Karavan
- Kovalenky
- Manchenky
- Sanzhary
- Spartasy
- Travneve
- Udarne

== Geography ==
Liubotyn urban hromada is located in the center of Kharkiv region, west of the regional center Kharkiv.

Liubotyn urban hromada is located on the slopes of the Central Russian Upland, in the forest-steppe natural zone, in the basin of the Siversky Donets River (Don basin).

The climate of the hromada is temperate continental with cold winters and hot summers. The average annual temperature is +8.7 °C (in January -4.5, in July +22). The average annual rainfall is 520 mm. The highest rainfall occurs in the summer.

There are more than 30 ponds in the community. They are located in the valleys of the Myareya and Liubotynka rivers, as well as in the ravines.

The soils of the community are chernozems and meadow soils.

== See also ==
- List of hromadas of Ukraine
- Hromada profile
