= Kost (surname) =

Kost is a German, Dutch, Polish and Ukrainian surname, either a nickname for a bony angular person from Ukrainian And Czech kost, Slovak kosť or Polish kość "bone". As a German surname, it may be a nickname derived from the word kost, 'cost' for person who abuses hospitality. It may also be a residual form of the baptismal name Constantine in various languages. Notable people with the surname include:

- Eryka Mondry-Kost (1940), Polish gymnast
- Joseph Kost (1947), Israeli academic
- Nina Kost (1995), Swiss swimmer
- R. J. Kost, American politician
- Roman Kost (1984), Ukrainian sculptor
- Thomas Kost (1969), German football manager
