= Manchenky =

Rural locality in Kharkiv Oblast, Ukraine

Manchenky Манченки
- Rural settlement
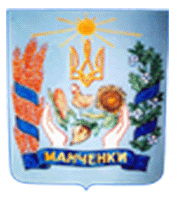
- Seal

- Location in Kharkiv Oblast Location in Ukraine
- Coordinates: 49°58′48″N 35°51′08″E
- Country: Ukraine
- Oblast: Kharkiv Oblast
- Raion: Kharkiv Raion

Population (2022)
  - Total: 665
- Time zone: UTC+2 (EET)
  - Summer (DST): UTC+3 (EEST)

Manchenky (Ukrainian and Russian: Манченки) is a rural settlement in Kharkiv Raion of Kharkiv Oblast in Ukraine. It is located approximately 30 kilometres (19 mi) west of the city of Kharkiv. Manchenky belongs to Liubotyn urban hromada, one of the hromadas of Ukraine. Population: 665 (2022 estimate).

Until 26 January 2024, Manchenky was designated urban-type settlement. On this day, a new law entered into force which abolished this status, and Manchenky became a rural settlement.

== Economy ==
=== Transportation ===
Manchenky railway station is on the railway connecting Kharkiv with Bohodukhiv and Sumy. There is local passenger traffic.

The settlement has access to Highway M03 which connects Kharkiv with Kyiv.
