= Roman Kost =

Ukrainian sculptor

- Роман Сергеевич Кость
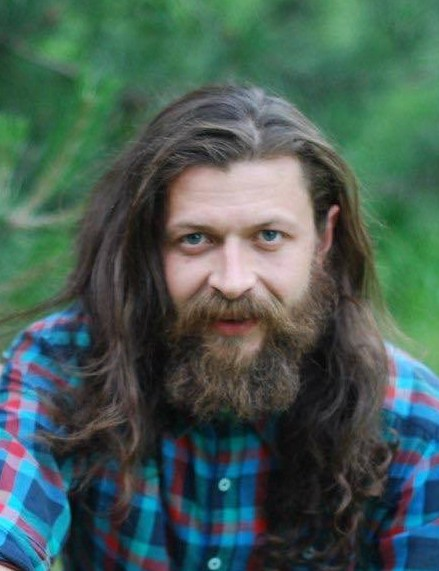
- Roman Kost, 2015
- Born: April 18, 1984; Liubotyn, Kharkiv Oblast, Ukraine
- Education: Kharkiv State Academy of Design and Arts
- Known for: Sculpture

Roman Kost (April 18, 1984, Liubotyn, Kharkiv Oblast, Ukraine) is a Ukrainian sculptor, known for his metalwork.

== Biography ==
Kost was born on April 18, 1984, in the city of Liubotyn, Kharkiv Oblast, Ukraine. Since childhood, he was fond of drawing.

In 2002, he began to engage in blacksmithing. In 2005, he graduated from the Kharkiv State Academy of Design and Arts with a degree in Interior Design and Equipment.

He took part in the reconstruction of the Kharkov Church of St. Martyr Alexander, the Church of the Beheading of the Head of John the Baptist and the Holy Annunciation Cathedral.

From 2009 to 2011 he worked in St. Petersburg. In 2011 he moved to Taganrog. In 2014, the first solo exhibition of Roman Kost, Metalloplastika, took place in the Exhibition Hall of the Taganrog branch of the Union of Artists of Russia.

In 2015, the sculptural work of Roman Kost, Positive, was installed in the historical part of Ivano-Frankivsk, on Shevchenko Street, one of the oldest and most beautiful streets of the city.

Since 2015, he took part in the European International Festival of Blacksmithing art Forging in the Baroque style, held in Narva, Estonia. In 2016, he became the winner of the annual competition held within the framework of this festival.

In August 2018, he was invited to the international Biennale Metal Sculpture in Sicily. For the conceptual work of Doors, he was awarded a special prize of criticism.

In September 2019, Roman Kost became the winner of the 23rd European Biennial of Blacksmithing Art in the Sculpture nomination. The Biennale was held in Italy, in the commune of Pratovecchio Stia (Tuscany, province of Arezzo) and was dedicated to the anniversary of the landing of man on the moon. Competitive composition of Roman Kost was called Deep deep down. Far far in. The winning work remained forever in Italy and was installed in the center of Pratovecchio Stia.

Until the February 24, 2022, he lived and worked in Taganrog.

== Works are in collections ==
- Rostov Regional Museum of Fine Arts, Rostov-on-Don.
- The Museum of Modern Fine Art on Dmitrovskaya, Rostov-on-Don.
- Taganrog Art Museum, Taganrog.
- Gallery «Piter», Taganrog.
- ZHDANOV Gallery, Taganrog.
- Private collections in Russia, Germany, Ukraine, Israel, Switzerland, Finland.

== Solo exhibitions ==
- 2017 — Iron Botany. Rostov Regional Museum of Fine Arts, Rostov-on-Don.
- 2016 — The Nature of Metal. Exhibition Hall of the Union of Artists of Russia, Taganrog.
- 2014 — Metalloplastika. Exhibition Hall of the Union of Artists of Russia, Taganrog.

== Gallery ==
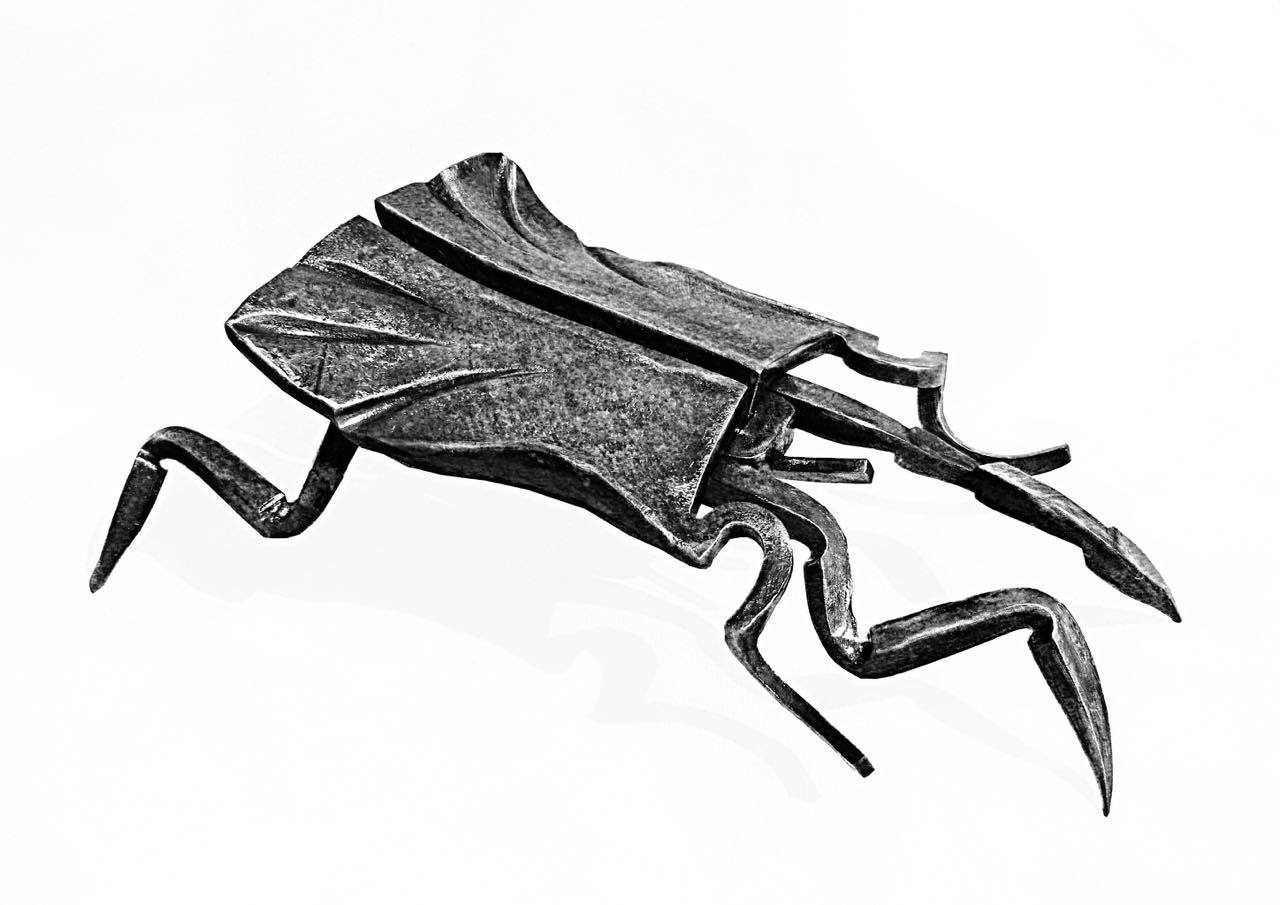
«Beetle», steel/forging, 300x150x100, 2013.

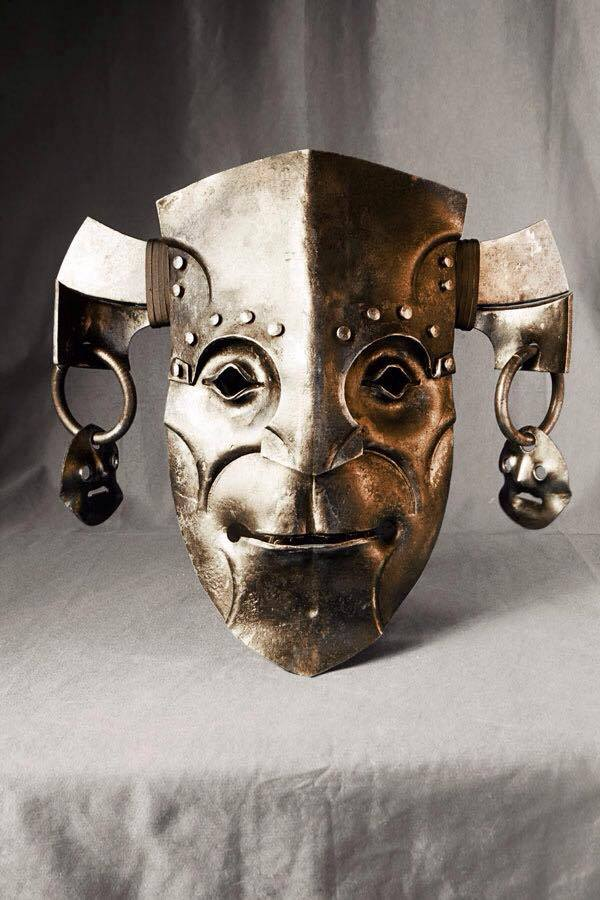
«Demon 1», steel/forging, 400x400, 2014.

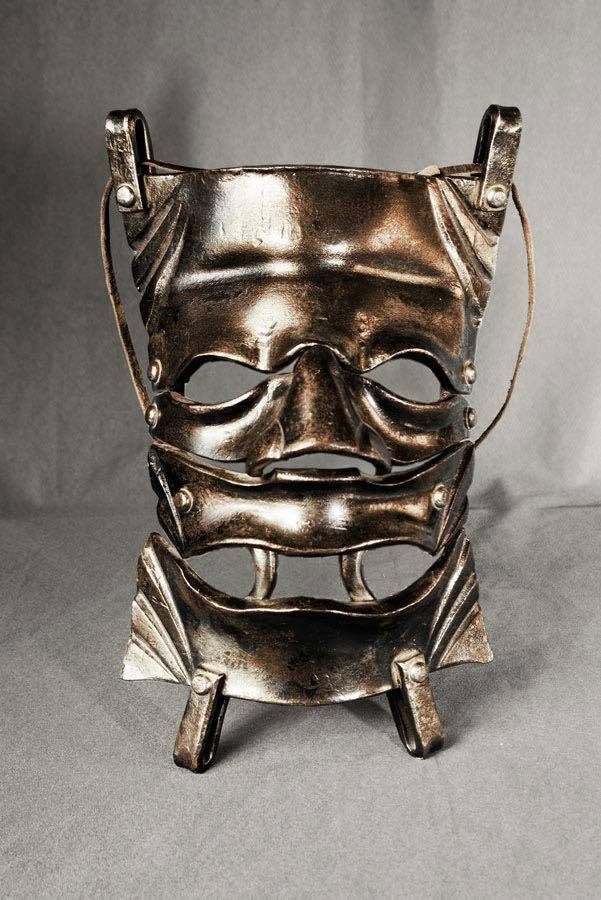
«Demon 2», steel/forging, 250x150x60, 2014.

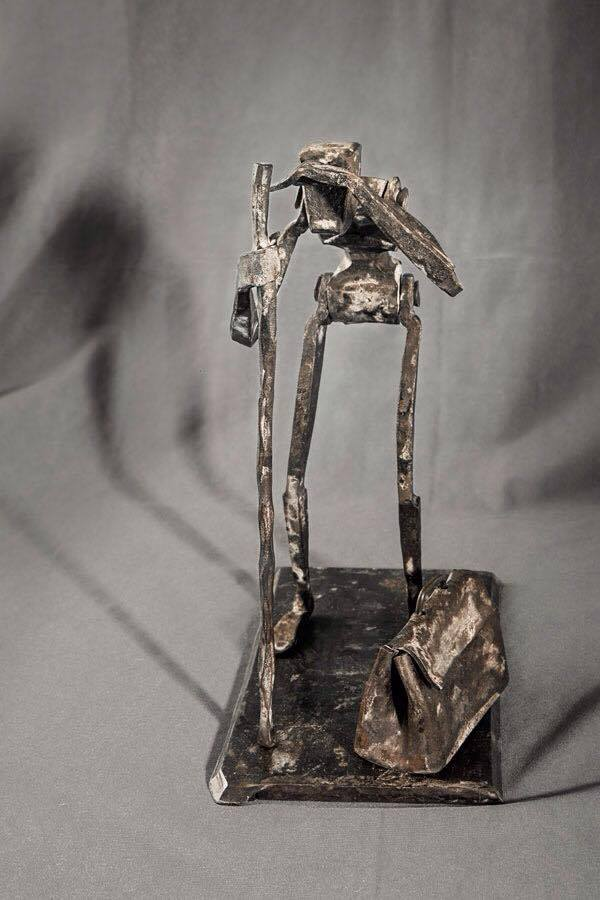
«Wanderer», steel/forging, 300x150x200, 2014.

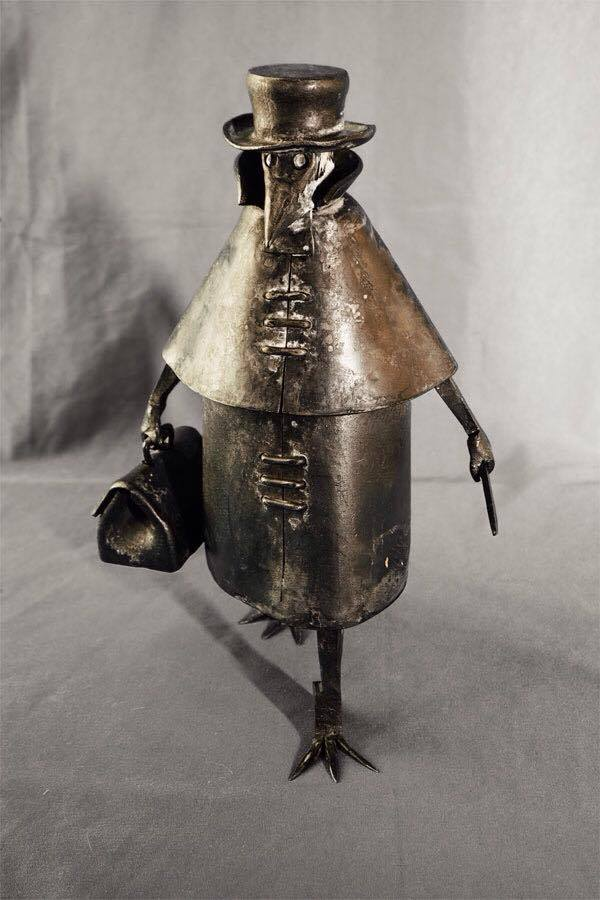
«Plague Doctor», steel/forging, 270x150x120, 2014.

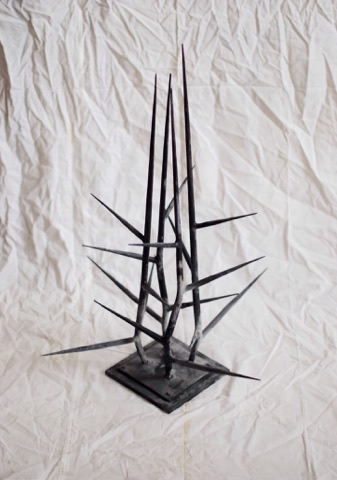
«Acacia», steel/forging, 470x330x330, 2016.
