= Liubotyn =

City in Kharkiv Oblast, Ukraine

Liubotyn Люботин
- City
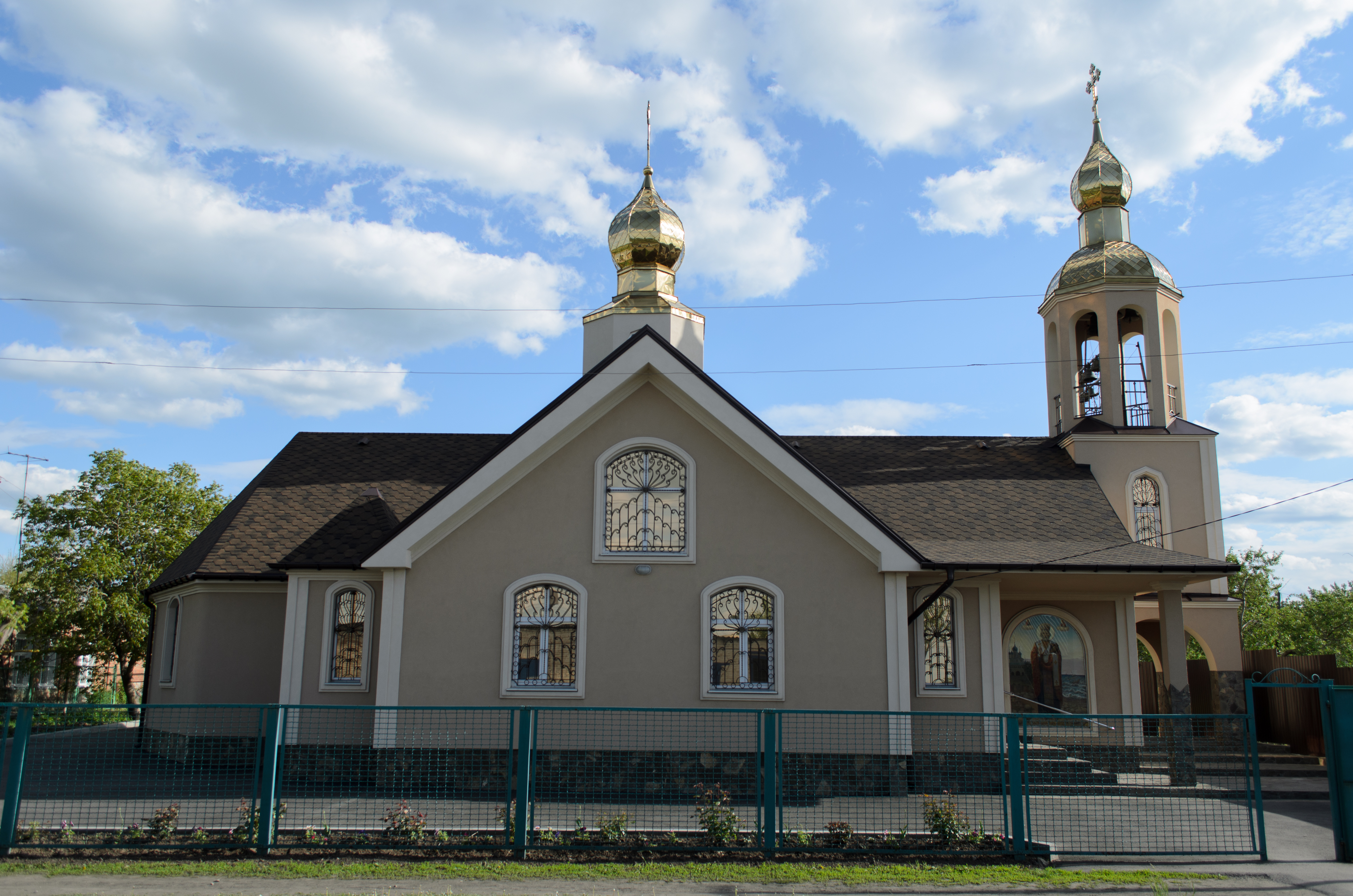
- St. Nicholas Church

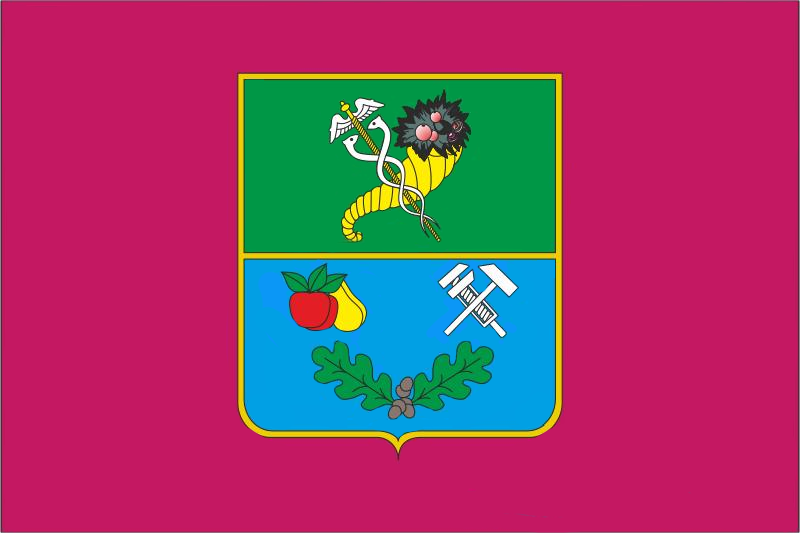
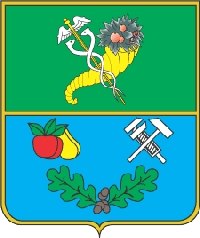
- Flag Coat of arms
- Interactive map of Liubotyn
- Location within Ukraine Location within Kharkiv Oblast
- Coordinates: 49°56′54″N 35°55′46″E
- Country: Ukraine
- Oblast: Kharkiv Oblast
- Raion: Kharkiv Raion
- Hromada: Liubotyn urban hromada
- Founded: 1650

Area
  - Total: 31.1 km^{2} (12.0 sq mi)

Population (2022)
  - Total: 20,001
  - Density: 643/km^{2} (1,670/sq mi)
- Time zone: UTC+2 (EET)
  - Summer (DST): UTC+3 (EEST)
- Postal code: 62433-62436
- Website: Archived

Liubotyn or Lyubotyn (Ukrainian: Люботин, pronounced [lʲʊboˈtɪn]; Russian: Люботин, romanized: Lyubotin) is a city in Kharkiv Raion, Kharkiv Oblast, eastern Ukraine. It hosts the administration of Liubotyn urban hromada, one of the hromadas of Ukraine. Population: 20,001 (2022 estimate).

== Administrative status ==
Until 18 July 2020, Liubotyn was incorporated as a city of oblast significance and the center of Liubotyn Municipality. The municipality was abolished in July 2020 as part of the administrative reform of Ukraine, which reduced the number of raions of Kharkiv Oblast to seven. The area of Liubotyn Municipality was merged into Kharkiv Raion.

== History ==
The city was established in 1650 by Ukrainian Cossacks from the right-bank Ukraine.

During the Ukrainian War of Independence, from 1917 to 1920, it passed between various factions. Afterwards it was administratively part of the Kharkiv Governorate of Ukraine.

During World War II, Liubotyn was under German occupation from 20 October 1941 to 22 February 1943 and again from 9 March to 29 August 1943.

On June 19, 2022, at about 23:30, the Russian military fired a rocket at Liubotyn. As a result of two explosions, the lyceum of railway transport, where the center for the distribution of humanitarian aid was located, was damaged. A number of private houses were damaged by the shock wave and debris.

== Cityscape ==
The central square in Liubotyn is Soborna Square. It is the central park, next to which is the old princely park of the early 19th century in the English style. The park has many entertainment venues and a memorial to those who died in World War II, built in 2006. The city's pride is the longest covered pedestrian railway bridge in Europe, with a total length of 260 meters. There are three Orthodox churches in the city: in Staryi Liubotyn (early 19th century), in Hiiivka (early 19th century), and in the city center (early 20th century).

== Economy ==
The city has traditionally served as an important railway junction, hosting a number of railroad transport enterprises, as well as a brick factory and a spirits distillery.

== Demographics ==
In 1959 the city had 32,600 inhabitants.

Ethnic composition according to the Ukrainian national census in 2001:

Ethnic groups in Liubotyn
	percent
Ukrainians	89.65%
Russians	8.40%
Belarusians	0.30%
Armenians	0.17%
others	1.48%

== Gallery ==
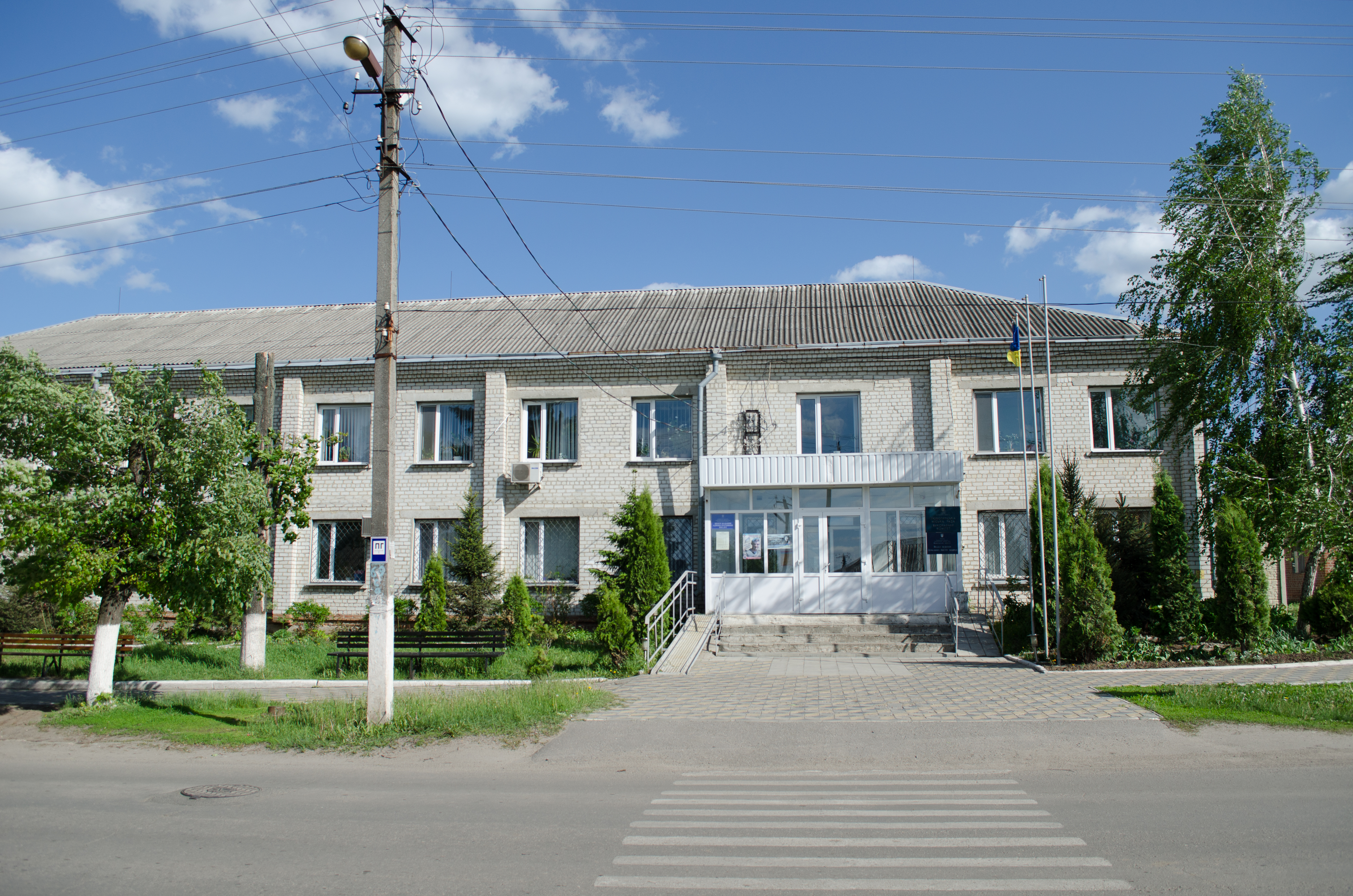
City Council

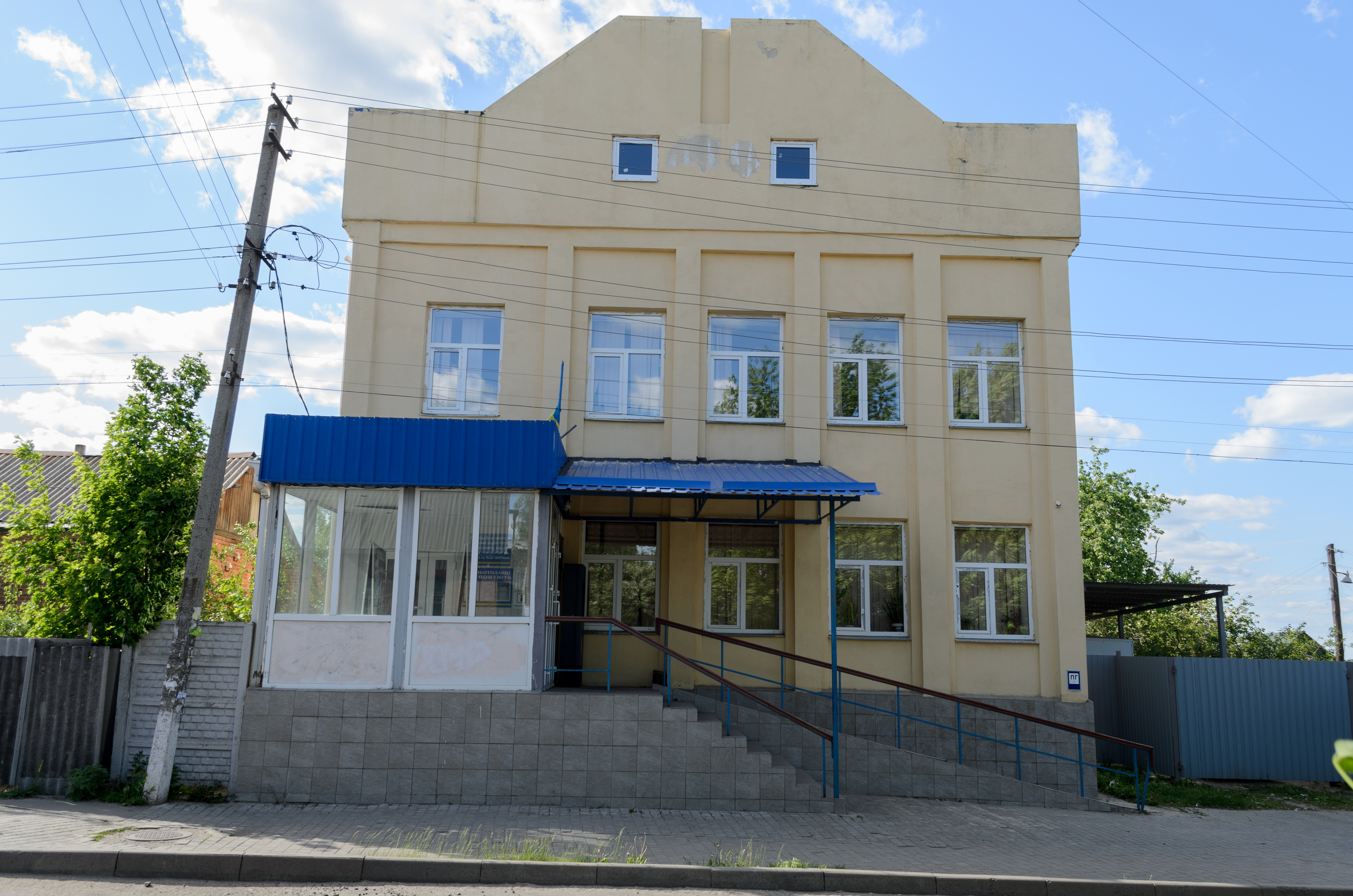
City employment centre

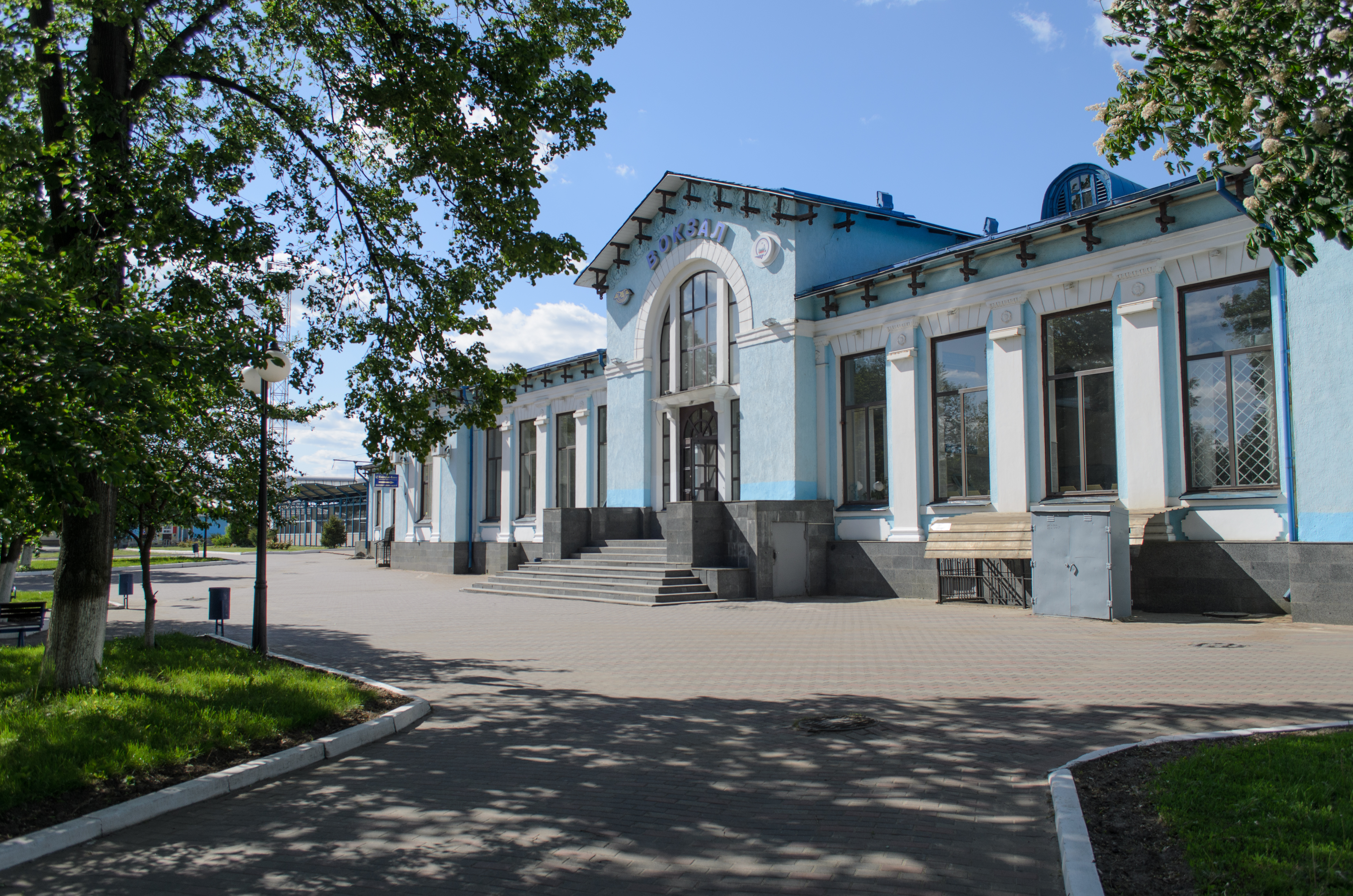
Railway station

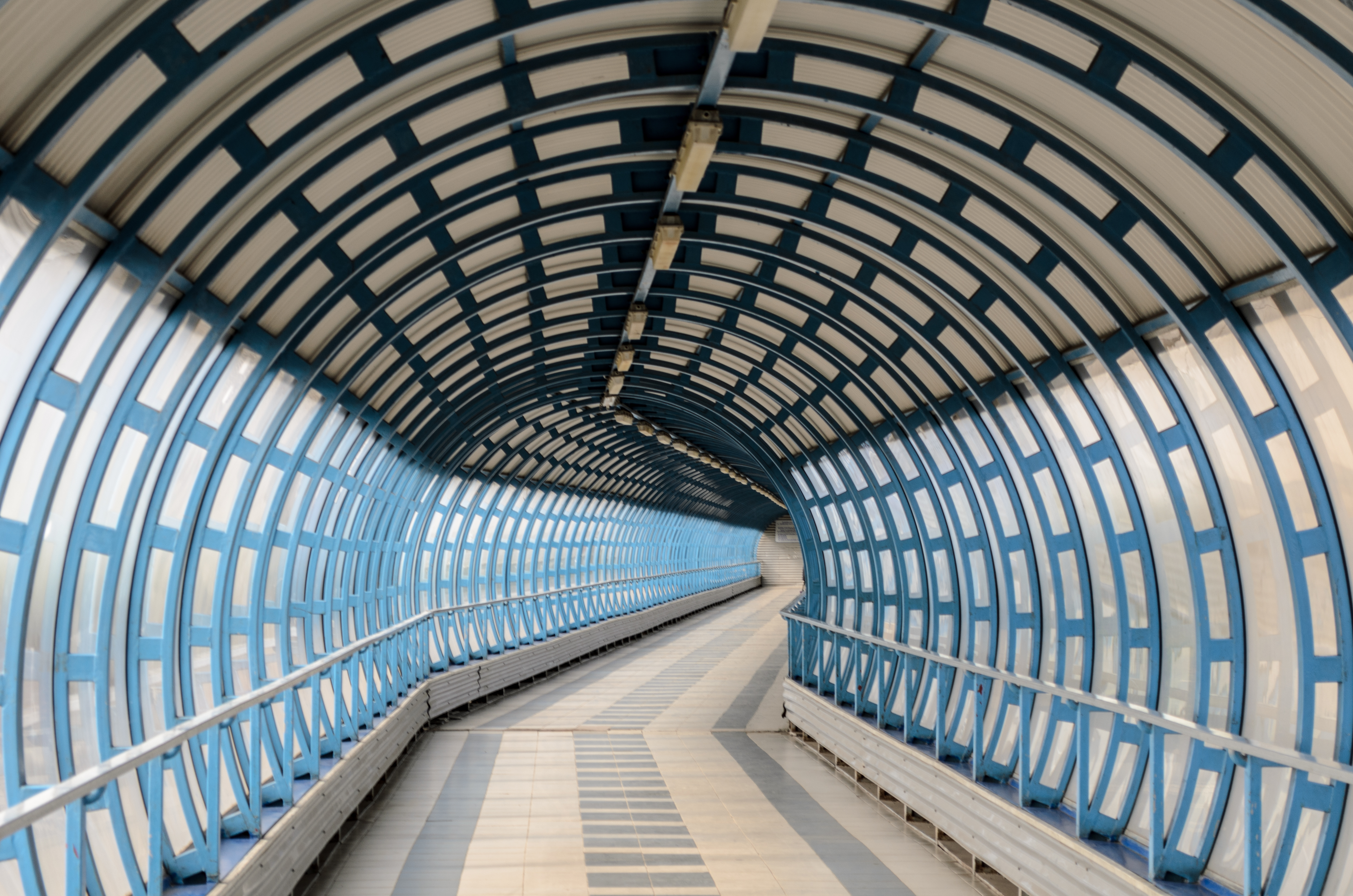
Train station overpass

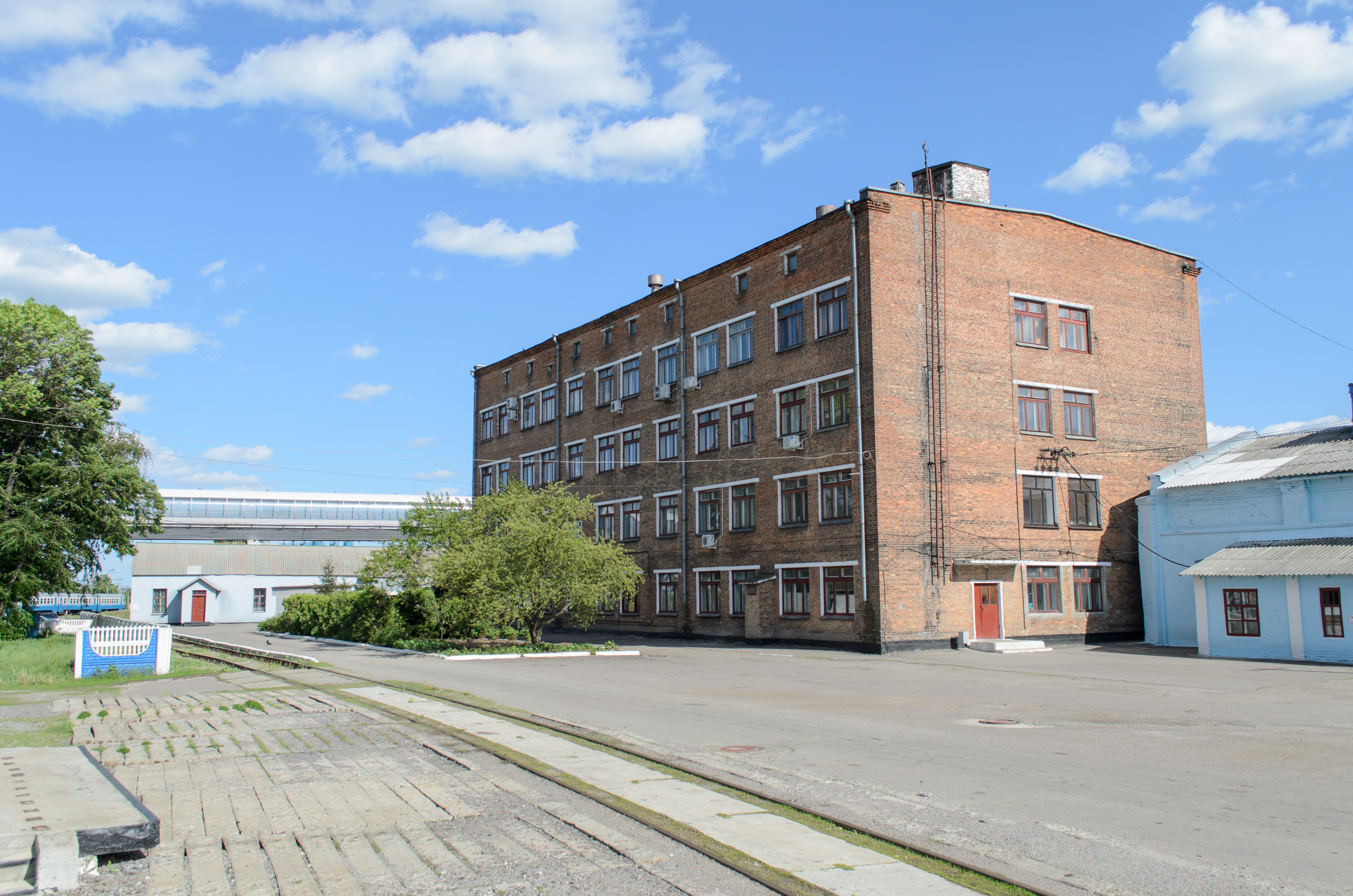
Liubotyn railway depot

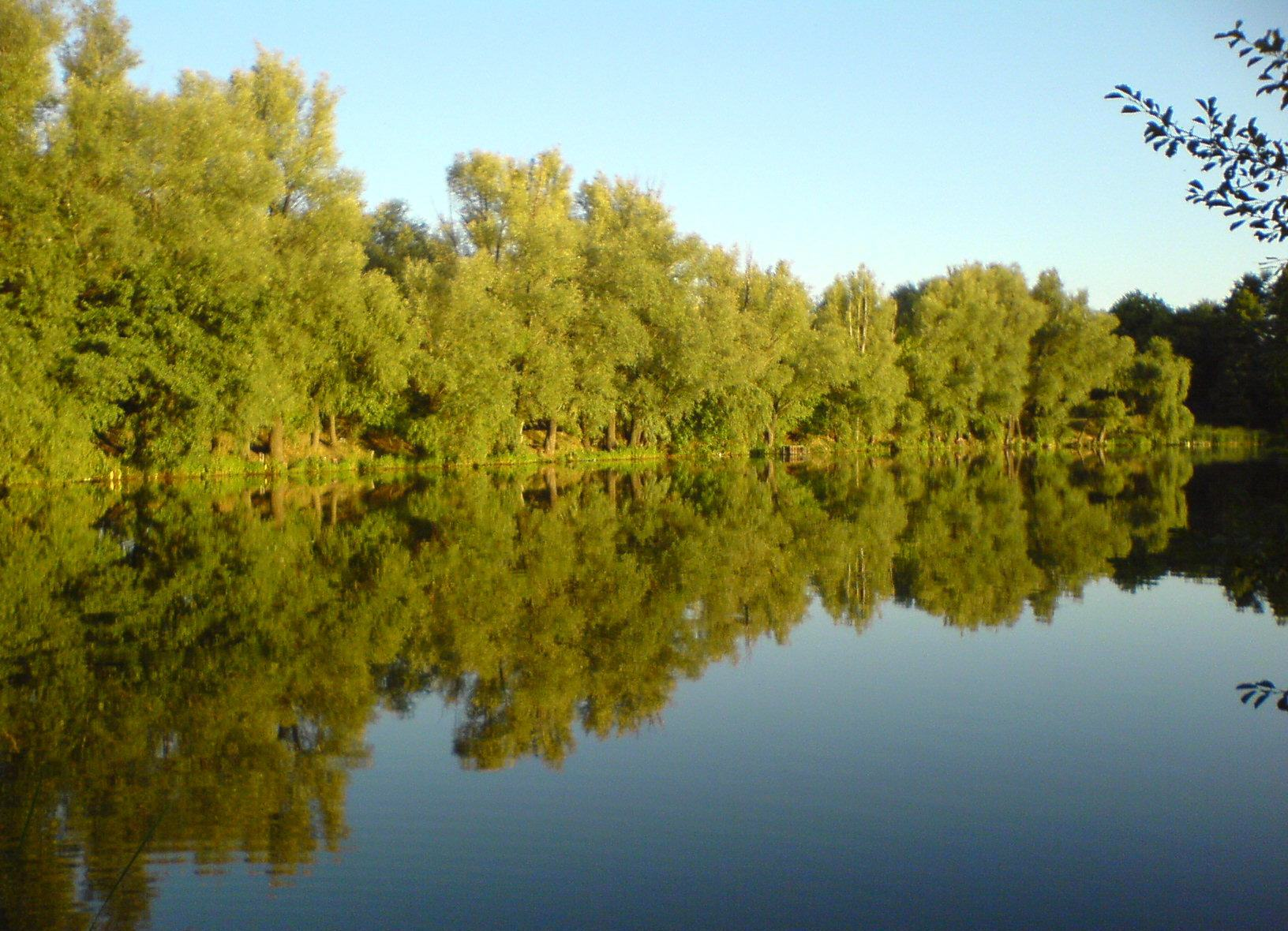
Liubotyn pond

== Notable people ==
The following people have been born or have lived in Liubotyn:

- D. S. Mirsky — Russian political and literary historian born in the former Giyovka estate.
- Oleg Khudolii — Ukrainian researcher, Doctor of Physical Education and Sports, full professor, academician of the Higher School Academy of Sciences of Ukraine.
- Oleg Goltvyansky (1980) — is a Ukrainian far-right politician and the leader of political party Ukrainian National Union. He was the commander of the volunteer Pechersk Battalion.
- Roman Kost (1984) — Ukrainian sculptor, master of artistic forging.
