= Kost, Minnesota =

Unincorporated community in Minnesota, United States

Kost
- Unincorporated community
- Location within Minnesota Location within the United States
- Coordinates: 45°29′31″N 92°52′05″W
- Country: United States
- State: Minnesota
- County: Chisago
- Elevation: 873 ft (266 m)
- Time zone: UTC-6 (Central (CST))
  - Summer (DST): UTC-5 (CDT)
- Postal code: 55056
- Area code: 651
- GNIS feature ID: 654781

Kost is an unincorporated community in Chisago County, in the U.S. state of Minnesota.

== History ==
Ferdinand A. Kost built a local gristmill in 1883, and gave the surrounding community its name. A post office was established at Kost in 1884, and remained in operation until it was discontinued in 1903.
