= Trostyanets Raion, Sumy Oblast =

Former subdivision of Sumy Oblast, Ukraine

Trostyanets Raion Тростянецький район
- Raion
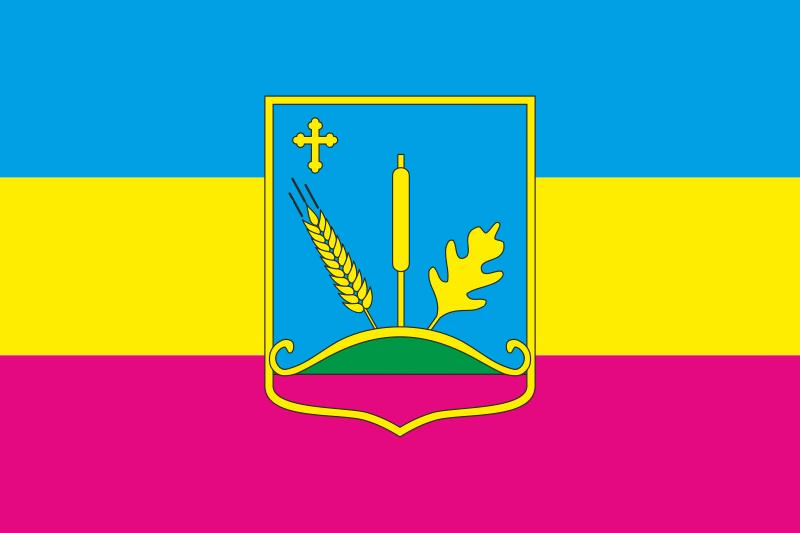
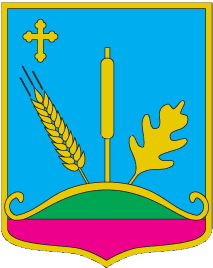
- Flag Coat of arms

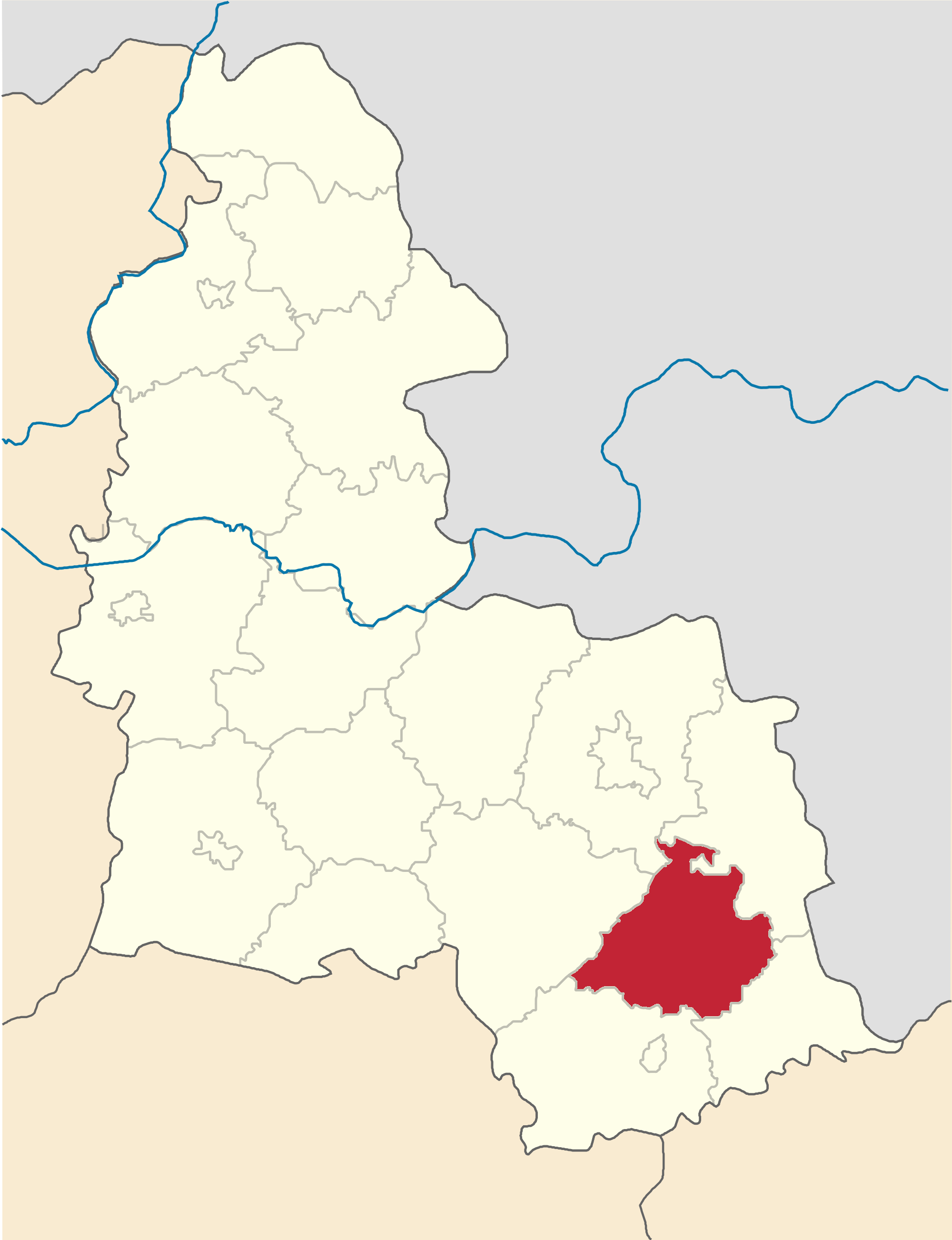
- Raion location in Sumy Oblast
- Coordinates: 50°32′21.93″N 34°59′9.9306″E
- Country: Ukraine
- Oblast: Sumy Oblast
- Disestablished: 18 July 2020
- Admin. center: Trostyanets

Area
  - Total: 1,065 km^{2} (411 sq mi)

Population (2020)
  - Total: 33,413
  - Density: 31.37/km^{2} (81.26/sq mi)
- Time zone: UTC+2 (EET)
  - Summer (DST): UTC+3 (EEST)
- Website: https://trostyanets-miskrada.gov.ua/

Trostyanets Raion or Trostianets Raion (Ukrainian: Тростянецький район) was a raion in Sumy Oblast in Central Ukraine. The administrative center of the raion was the town of Trostyanets. The raion was abolished on 18 July 2020 as part of the administrative reform of Ukraine, which reduced the number of raions of Sumy Oblast to five. The last estimate of the raion population was 33,413 (2020 est.).

In March 1930 the Raion was the centre of a quickly defeated pro-Ukrainian anti-Soviet Union revolt.
