= Lyman front of the 2022 Kharkiv counteroffensive =

September to October 2022 battle in Ukraine

- Part of the 2022 Kharkiv counteroffensive in the Russian invasion of Ukraine
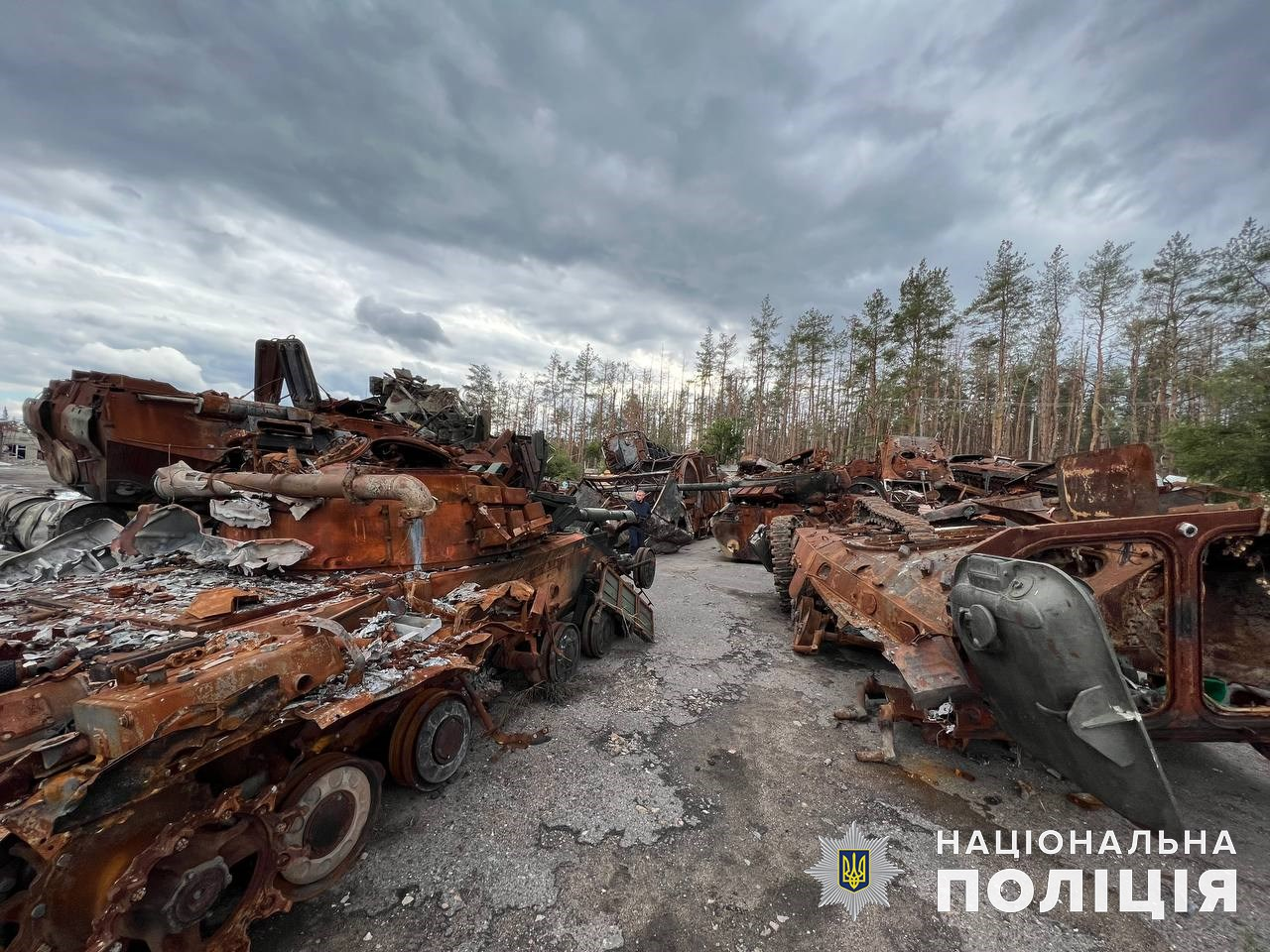
- Destroyed Russian equipment in Lyman
Date	3 September – 1 October 2022 (4 weeks)
Location	Lyman, Donetsk Oblast, Ukraine 48°59′N 37°49′E
Result	Ukrainian victory

Belligerents
Russia; Luhansk PR (until 30 September)	Ukraine

Commanders and leaders
(Russia) Alexander Lapin; Sergei Fomchenkov	(Ukraine) Valerii Zaluzhnyi

Units involved
Russian Armed Forces: 503rd Guards Motor Rifle Regiment; 20th Guards Combined Arms Army elements; 752nd Guards Motor Rifle Regiment; 3rd Guards Spetsnaz Brigade detachment; BARS militia; BARS-13 "Russian Legion"; BARS-16 (Kuban detachment); LPR People's Militia: 208th "Cossack" Motor Rifle Regiment; Local separatist special forces	Armed Forces of Ukraine: 214th Rifle Battalion; 103rd Territorial Defence Brigade; 81st Airmobile Brigade; Special Operations Forces; National Guard of Ukraine: Dnipro-1 Regiment; Operational Battalion "Serhiy Kulchytsky"

Strength
c. 5,500 (Ukrainian estimate)	Unknown

Casualties and losses
Probably heavy (per British Ministry of Defence); 1,500+ killed (Ukrainian claim)	Unknown

In September 2022, a military engagement took place near Lyman, Ukraine, during a major Ukrainian counteroffensive in Kharkiv Oblast. By 30 September, Ukrainian forces had closed in on the city after crossing the Siverskyi Donets River, advancing along Lyman's southern and eastern flanks while capturing land northwest of the settlement, allowing Ukrainian forces to cut off the only road left supplying the occupying forces from the north. On 1 October, Ukrainian forces entered Lyman after a Russian withdrawal.

== Background ==
On 24 March 2022, a month into the Russian invasion of Ukraine, Russia claimed to control 93% of Luhansk Oblast, leaving Sievierodonetsk and Lysychansk as strategically important Ukrainian holdouts in the area. Russian plans to capture Sievierodonetsk hinged upon its successes in the nearby cities of Rubizhne to the north and Popasna to the south. By 6 April, Russian forces had reportedly captured 60% of Rubizhne, and shells and rockets were landing in Sievierodonetsk at "regular, sustained intervals". Russian forces reportedly seized Rubizhne on 12 May 2022.

South of Lyman, the battle of the Siverskyi Donets occurred mid-May 2022, with Ukraine repelling multiple Russian attempts to cross the river. Russian forces suffered an estimated 400 to 485 dead and wounded during the attempts.

On 27 May, however, Ukrainian Defence Ministry claimed that the battle for control of the city was still ongoing, stating their forces were continuing to hold the southwestern and northeastern districts, while other Ukrainian officials acknowledged most of Lyman, including the city center, was under Russian control. In addition, the United Kingdom also assessed most of the town had come under Russian control by 27 May.

== Battle ==
=== Early September ===
On 3 September, Ukraine's 103rd Territorial Defense Brigade began to conduct combat operations in the Donetsk Oblast as part of a major Ukrainian offensive. The brigade's 63rd Battalion established crossings over the Siverskyi Donets river from the village of Kryva Luka, and, with the support of units of the Ukrainian National Guard's 15th Regiment, took control of the village of Ozerne. The Institute for the Study of War said that the capture of the village implied "degrading Russian control of the river's left bank east of Sloviansk". By 5 September, Ukrainian forces had also retaken the village of Staryi Karavan.

Amid the 2022 Kharkiv counteroffensive, when Ukraine retook Kupiansk and Izium, Ukraine also claimed it had reached the southern outskirts of Lyman on 10 September. The same day, military equipment was sent to Lyman and battles were fought on the outskirts of the city. Igor Girkin reported that the Russian army had retreated and units from the LPR and DPR forces were defending forested areas near Lyman. It was later claimed that the Russian troops garrisoning Lyman had not been properly supplied and reinforced by the region's leading Russian commander, Alexander Lapin.

Ukrainian forces were moving to encircle Lyman from the south, east, west and northwest, and later north, while Russian forces identified the Russian defenders of Lyman as BARS-13 and BARS-16 detachments (the latter of which is known as the "Kuban" detachment), which are sub-battalion formations comprising Russian reservists from the Russian Special Combat Army Reserve. BARS-13 commander Sergei Fomchenkov publicly warned that his troops' position was "extremely difficult", but initially expressed the belief that the city could be held.

Map of the Lyman pocket during the battle of Lyman

=== 12 September ===
On 12 September, Ukrainian forces liberated the town of Sviatohirsk.

=== 15 September ===
On 15 September, Ukrainian forces retook Sosnove, forcing the small Russian force in the nearby Studenok, a settlement in Kharkiv Oblast east of the Oskil River, to withdraw to avoid encirclement.

=== 17 September ===
On 17 September, Ukrainian forces liberated the town of Shchurove, 6 km southwest of Lyman.

=== 19–21 September ===
Fierce battles took place in Yarova by 19 September, and Russian military bloggers reported fighting in Drobysheve on 21 September.

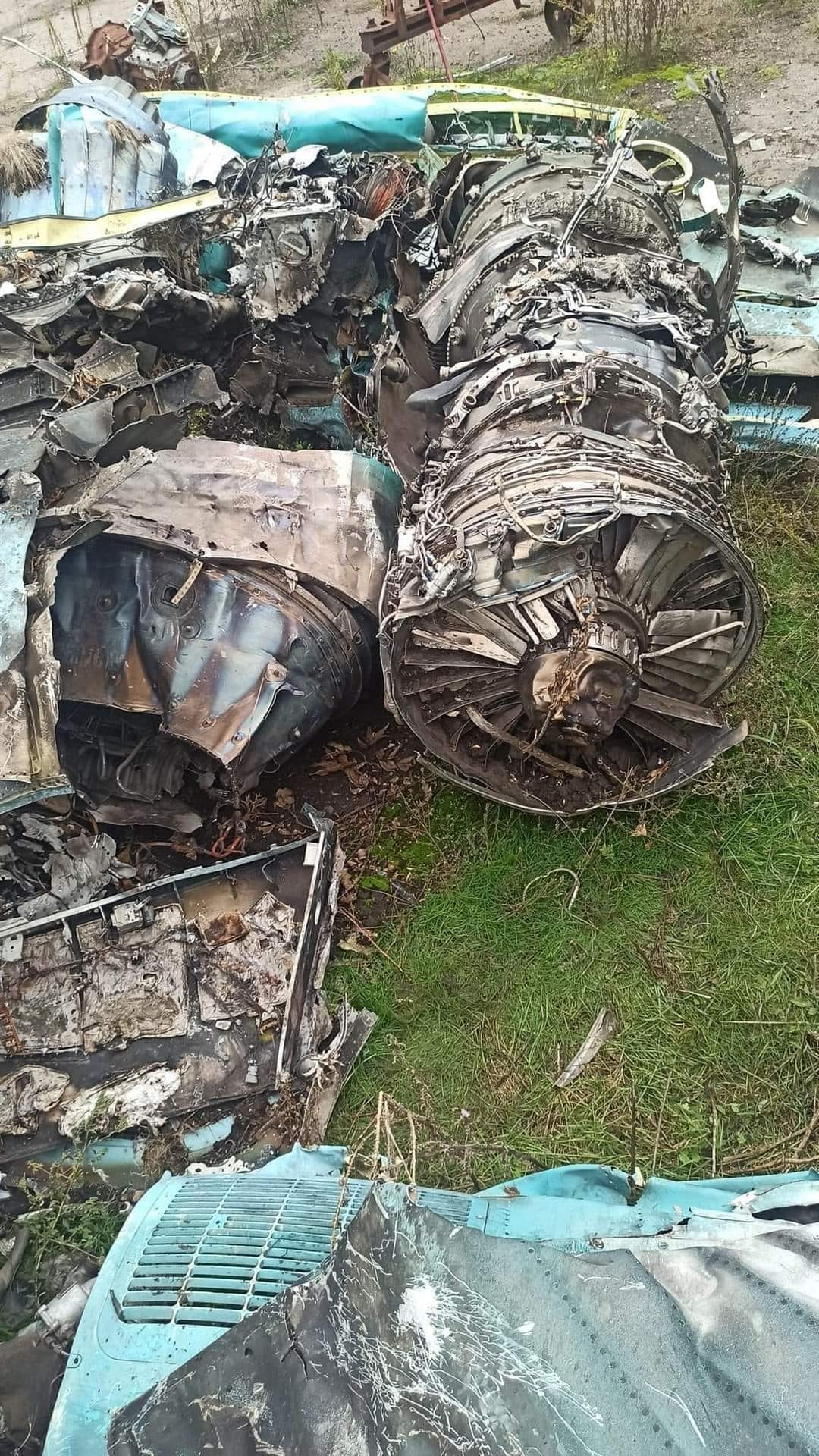
The wreckage of a Russian Air Force Sukhoi Su-34, registered RF-81852, pictured after the Russian withdrawal.

=== 22 September ===
Yatskivka and Korovii Yar came under Ukrainian control by 22 September, as Ukrainian forces inched closer to the administrative border of Donetsk Oblast and Kharkiv Oblast as well as Luhansk Oblast.

The same day, several Russian sources reported fighting to the northwest of Lyman and claimed that Ukrainian troops penetrated Russian defenses in Ridkodub and Karpivka, both 20 km north of Lyman.

=== 24–26 September ===
By 24–25 September, Ukrainian forces tried to push south from the Ridkodub-Nove line.

By 24 September, Russian military bloggers were reporting that Ukrainian forces had taken control of half of Novoselivka, 10 km northwest of Lyman; by 28 September, the Ukrainian 81st Brigade, along with the National Guard, fully liberated Novoselivka and advanced further south and east towards Lyman.

=== 27 September ===
By 27 September, some Russian milbloggers claimed that Ukrainian reconnaissance and sabotage groups had been witnessed in Torske and Yampil, two settlements east of Lyman.

=== 28 September ===
By 28 September, Ukrainian forces had recaptured Karpivka, Nove, Ridkodub, and Novoselivka in Donetsk Oblast, and were advancing eastward to liberate Katerynivka. It was also reported that Ukrainian forces had liberated Zelena Dolyna, about 15 km north of Lyman. Geolocated combat footage corroborated claims made by Russian milbloggers that Ukrainians took control of Zelena Dolyna and pushed east to take control of Kolodiazi (11 km northeast of Lyman).

On 28 September, several Russian sources reported that Ukrainian troops pushed southeast of Kolodiazi (which is north of Lyman) and were fighting on the outskirts of Torske, 12 km northeast of Lyman. Some Russian milbloggers also claimed that Ukrainian troops accumulated near Yampil (13 km southeast of Lyman) and broke through Russian defensive lines there to push towards Torske from the southwest. Some milbloggers were concerned that Svatove-Lyman road, a critical ground line of communication (GLOC) for the Russian grouping in Lyman, could be severed at any time by Ukrainian forces, thus finishing the encirclement of Russian troops in Lyman.

=== 29 September ===
On 29 September, a prominent Russian milblogger reported that Ukrainian forces broke through Russian defenses around Stavky, 10 km north of Lyman, and cut the Torske-Drobysheve road, the last supply and egress route for Russian elements holding the line west of Lyman. Another Russian milblogger, Rybar, pointed out that Ukrainian troops were attacking Lyman from three directions and had cut Russian access to the critical Svatove-Lyman road, the major ground line of communication (GLOC) sustaining the Russian grouping within Lyman itself.

=== 30 September ===
On 30 September, Russian sources indicated that Ukrainian forces had recaptured Stavky and severed the Drobysheve-Torske road, causing the Russian military to abandon Drobysheve.

By 30 September, a Russian war correspondent reported that the last highway into Lyman had been cut off by Ukrainian forces, calling the situation "extremely difficult" for the Russian soldiers there, and claimed that elements of the BARS-13 detachment and the 752nd Motorized Rifle Regiment of the 20th Combined Arms Army were "defending around Drobysheve and into Lyman."

On 30 September, Ukrainian forces liberated Yampil, and engaged in fierce battle around Zarichne-Torske area. Some Russian milbloggers claimed that Ukrainian forces had crossed the Siverskyi Donets River in Dronivka and were operating in the forests south of Kreminna, and Russian sources uniformly noted that Ukrainian artillery continued to interdict Russian forces’ single remaining egress route on the Kreminna-Torske road.

Ukraine's President Zelenskyy spoke of progress around Lyman in a video address on 30 September. He thanked Ukrainian troops for the liberation of Yampil, to the southeast and Drobysheve, to the northwest of the city.

=== Fall of the city and withdrawal of the Russian troops ===
==== 1 October ====
On 1 October Ukrainian troops raised the Ukrainian flag at an entrance sign to Lyman, after the Russian troops claimed to have withdrawn. It was initially reported that up to 5,000 Russian troops remained trapped inside. The Russian defence ministry confirmed that its forces had lost control of Lyman later that afternoon. According to Serhii Cherevatyi, spokesperson for Ukraine's eastern forces, the Russian forces were surrounded. He said that the capture of Lyman was important because "it is the next step towards liberation of the Ukrainian Donbas". The gains came a day after Russian president Putin proclaimed at a ceremony in Moscow, that the occupied regions of Ukraine, including the Donbas, were now Russian. Retired US general Ben Hodges said "This puts in bright lights that his claim is illegitimate and cannot be enforced".

Later on 1 October, Russian sources stated that their troops had withdrawn from Lyman toward the east, including Kreminna. Ukrainian sources later concurred that most of the Russian garrison had pulled out, though some troops had been left behind and were mopped up by the advancing Ukrainians. The United Kingdom Ministry of Defence estimated that the Russian forces had taken "heavy" losses during their hasty retreat to escape the encirclement. Following the battle, British intelligence assessed that the Russian forces defending the town were a mixed group of mobilized reservists and depleted professional troops. Based on social media messages and announcements of combat losses, the BBC assessed that the 1,600-strong 3rd Guards Spetsnaz Brigade suffered its worst casualties to date during fighting in Lyman, with the possibility that 75% of its reconnaissance company troops were lost. A significant number of fleeing Russian troops were trapped in a smaller pocket east of the city. Some Russian contingents had also lost contact to their main force, and hid in the nearby forests.

==== 2 October ====
Ukrainian president Volodymyr Zelenskyy confirmed on 2 October that Lyman had been "fully cleared".

== Aftermath ==
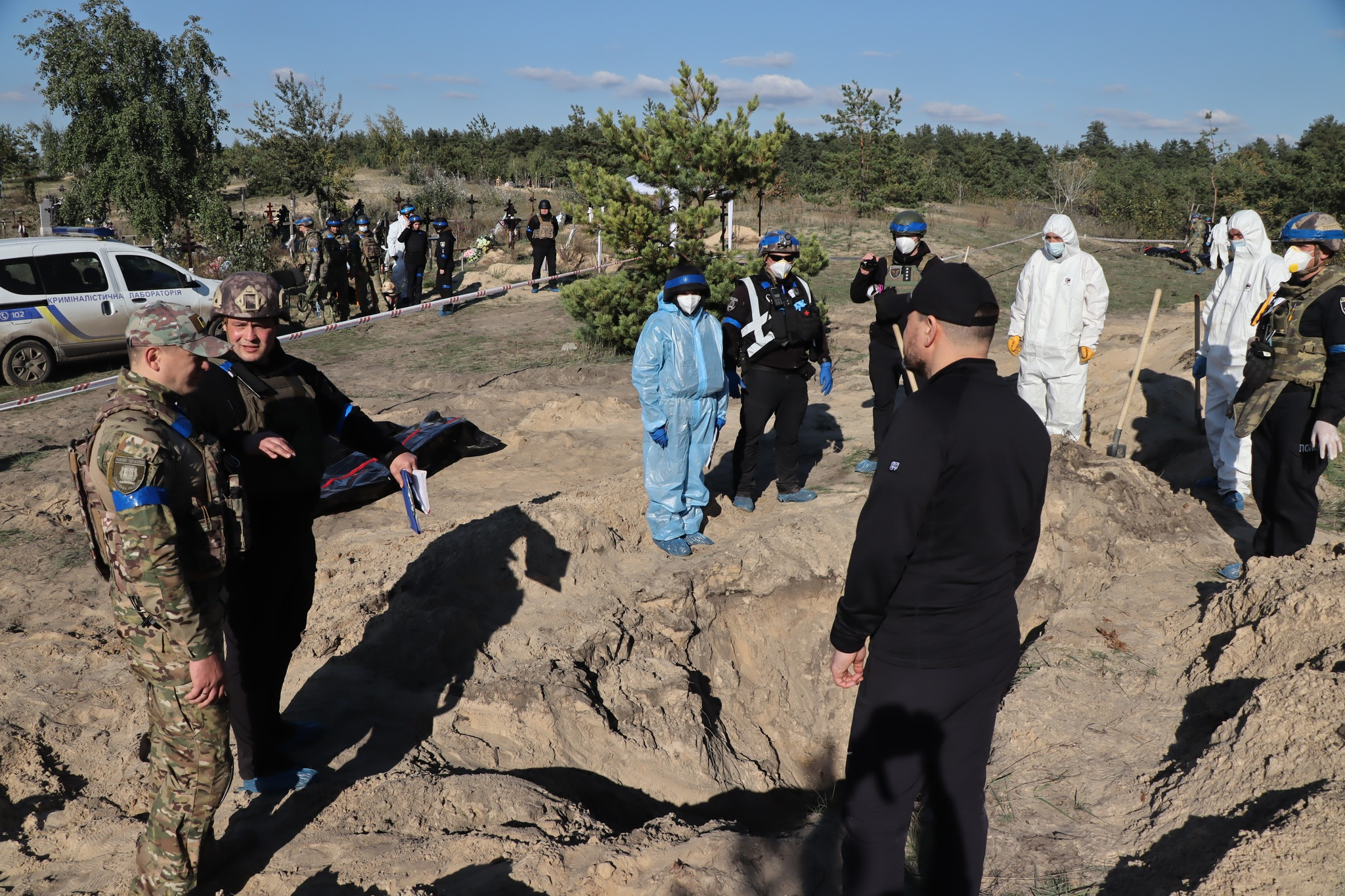
Exhumation at a mass grave in Lyman by the National Police of Ukraine, 9 October

Ukraine regained an important railroad hub, allowing mop-up operations in northern Donetsk Oblast (on the left side of the Siverskyi Donets river). The recapture of Lyman also dealt a blow to the legitimacy of the Russian annexation of Donetsk and Luhansk Oblasts on 30 September 2022, and opened the doors to possible northward and eastward advance to Svatove and Kreminna.

Journalist Harald Stutte described the Ukrainian recapture of Lyman by means of a pincer movement and encirclement of Russian forces as a "tactical masterstroke" and Valerii Zaluzhnyi's "third important victory" after the failure of Russian operations in northern Ukraine and the Kharkiv counteroffensive.

On 7 October 2022, governor Pavlo Kyrylenko and Ukrinform stated that a mass grave containing about 180 bodies had been found in Lyman. The exact number, identities (military or civilian) and causes of death of the people were not yet known. On 20 October, Donetsk Oblast Police Department reported that the bodies of 111 civilians and 35 soldiers were found in a mass burial site consisting of trenches, with some graves unmarked. At the time, the police said '58 mass burial sites [had] been found in the liberated settlements of Donetsk Oblast', 25 of which were located in Lyman.

== See also ==
- Outline of the Russo-Ukrainian War
