= 95th Air Assault Brigade =

Ukrainian Air Assault Forces unit

- 95-та окрема десантно-штурмова Поліська бригада
- Sleeve patch of the Brigade
- Active: 12 December 1992 – present
- Country: Ukraine
- Allegiance: Armed Forces of Ukraine
- Branch: Ukrainian Air Assault Forces
- Role: Air assault forces
- Garrison/HQ: Zhytomyr, Zhytomyr oblast
- Mottos: Strength, Courage, Honor!
- Engagements: KFOR UNAMSIL Iraq Campaign War in Donbas; Siege of Sloviansk; Kramatorsk standoff; Raid of the 95th Brigade; Russo-Ukrainian war; Russian invasion of Ukraine; 2023 Ukrainian counteroffensive; 2024 Kursk offensive
- Decorations: For Courage and Bravery
- Website: https://www.facebook.com/95BRIGADE

Commanders
- Notable commanders: Oleh Apostol

Insignia
- Former sleeve patch

- Flag

The 95th Air Assault Brigade "Polesia" (Note: Ukrainian: 95-та окрема десантно-штурмова Поліська бригада (95 ОДШБр); MUN A0281) is a unit of the Ukrainian Air Assault Forces. The brigade is located in Zhytomyr. It is considered one of the most prestigious and capable units in the Ukrainian military.

The brigade is one of Ukraine's Partnership for Peace units. The brigade received publicity in 2014 for its raid behind separatist lines, inflicting heavy losses on separatist and Russian forces during the war in Donbas.

== History ==
The 95th Training Center of the Ukrainian Air Assault Forces was created in the early 1990s in Zhytomyr (Korbutivka base) from the 242nd Training Tank Regiment. The 242nd Tank Training Regiment had been part of the 117th Guards Tank Training Division. A second base, Bohunia, was also used for the training center. In 1995, the training center was reorganized into the 95th Separate Airborne Brigade. All of the units except the staff and reconnaissance company moved to Bohunia.

The first jumps in the Brigade occurred in 1994. The brigade was also one of the first airmobile units to receive its Battle Flag, on 5 October 1994. Until the spring of 1996 all of the jumps were done from Mi-8 helicopters. By the end of the northern hemisphere summer of 1996 soldiers began jumping from Il-76 transport aircraft. All the jumps were conducted in the region of Smokovka, and in the Brigade's training range, located in the area of the Starokonstantinin road across the Teterev river. Currently, the brigade's drop zone is located near the Singury settlement, 10 kilometres (6 mi) from Zhytomyr.

The brigade originally had four battalions, one of which was later disbanded. Soldiers from the brigade took part in peacekeeping missions in Lebanon, Sierra Leone, the Democratic Republic of the Congo, Liberia, former Yugoslavia, Kosovo, and between 2003 and 2005 in Iraq.

In 2000 the brigade was reorganized into an Airmobile Brigade and was subordinated to the 8th Army Corps. Currently, the brigade includes the 13th Separate Airmobile Battalion, which consists of professional soldiers instead of conscripts. The brigade also includes the 2nd Airmobile Battalion which consists of conscripts based in Korbutovka (A-1910). Brigade headquarters and the conscript 1st Airmobile Battalion, specialized, artillery, and logistics units are based in Bohunia (A-0281).

=== Donbas war (2014-2022) ===
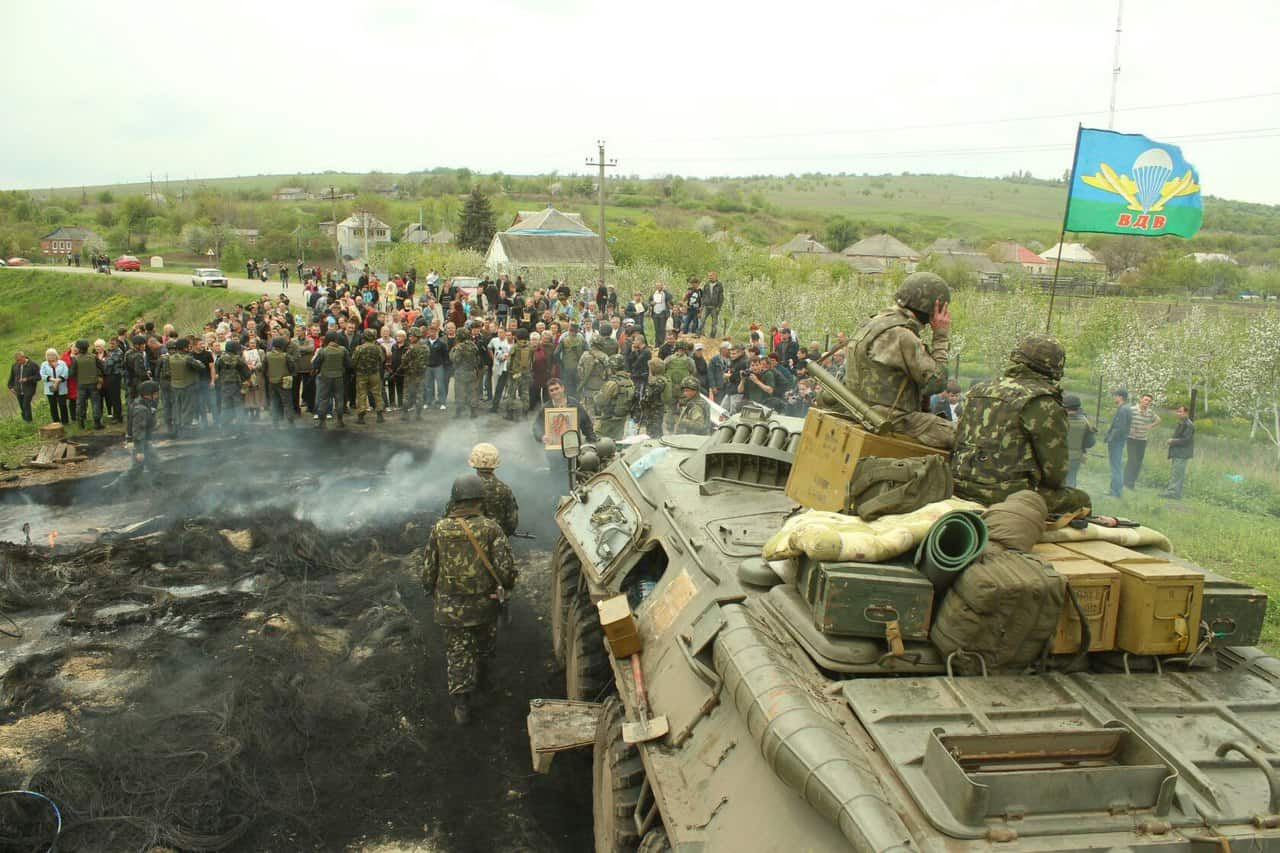
Pro-Russian civilians block the advance of a mechanized column of the 95th Brigade during the Siege of Sloviansk, May 2014

In 2014 the 95th Brigade took part in the siege of Sloviansk and the Kramatorsk standoff during the war in Donbas. On 13 May 2014, seven paratroopers from the unit were killed during an ambush by separatists in Kramatorsk.

In August 2014 the brigade conducted a raid behind the separatist lines. The 95th Airmobile Brigade, which had been reinforced with armor assets and attachments, launched a surprise attack on separatist lines, broke through into their rear areas, fought for 450 kilometers, and destroyed or captured numerous Russian tanks and artillery pieces before returning to Ukrainian lines. They operated not as a concentrated brigade but rather split into three company-sized elements on different axes of advance. According to Phillip Karber, it was one of the longest raids in the military history.

The unit was deployed to Donetsk Airport on 21 November 2014 as part of a regular rotation of Ukrainian troops stationed in the area.

On 29 November 2021, the City Council of Zhytomyr sent requests to the Minister of Defence and the President of Ukraine to award the 95th Air Assault Brigade the honorary title («Поліська» in Ukrainian). The mayor of the city, Serhiy Sukhomlyn, explained that the purpose of the renaming was to mark the military unit's combat merits, high training performance, and successes in anti-terrorist and peacemaking operations. He also said that this request came from the soldiers of the brigade.

=== Russia-Ukraine war (2022–present) ===
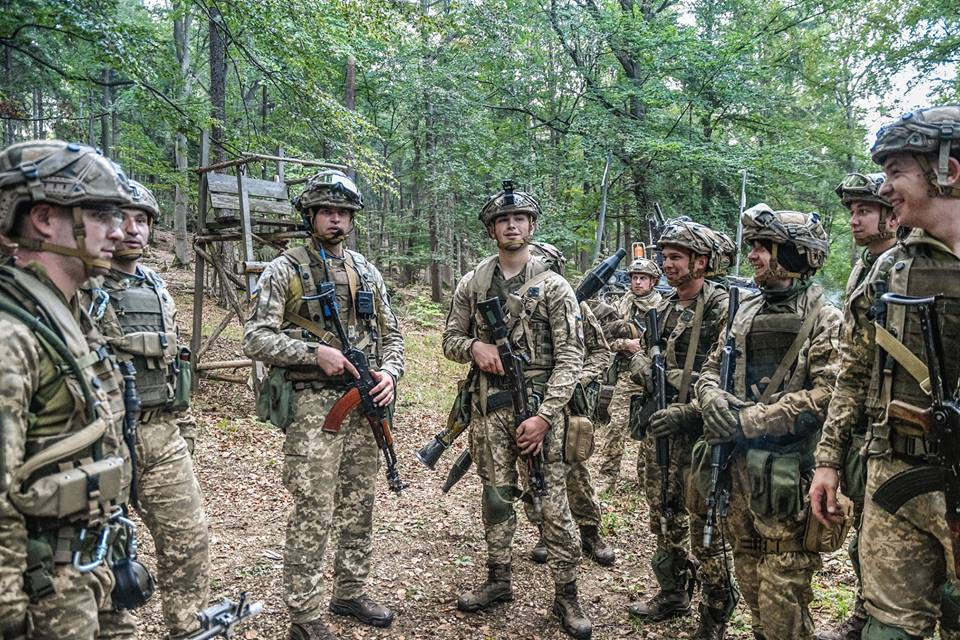
95th Brigade soldiers with modernized equipment in military exercises in 2018

Units of the 95th Brigade took part in combat near the villages of Kam'yanka and Dovhenke in the Kharkiv Oblast. The brigade held positions on the highway between Izium and Sloviansk.

On 28 June 2022, the brigade received the honorary award "For Courage and Bravery (Ukraine)" for its service during the Russo-Ukrainian War.

During a major Ukrainian counteroffensive in September 2022, units of the 95th Brigade were responsible for recapturing the villages of Dolyna, Mazanivka, Krasnopillia in the Donetsk Oblast, and the settlements of Dovhenke, Kam'yanka, Sukha Kam'yanka, Synycheno, Pasika, Yaremivka and Studenok in the Kharkiv Oblast.

As part of the encirclement of the city of Lyman, units of the 95th Brigade also took control of the villages of Oleksandrivka, Krymky, Korovii Yar, Yatskivka, Shandryholove, Zelena Dolyna and Kolodiazi in the Donetsk Oblast.

Two of the brigade's battalions conducted assault operations towards Kreminna in the Luhansk Oblast, reaching the villages of Balka Zhuravka and Ploshchanka and coming within 2 kilometres (1.2 mi) of Kreminna. Later, units of the 95th Brigade would take up defensive positions in the Kreminna forest and the villages of Terny, Makiiivka, and Novoiehorivka.

==== Kursk operation (2024–25) ====
In June 2024, units of the 95th Brigade were deployed to the Toretsk front. In late July 2024, these units were redeployed from Toretsk in order to take part in the Ukrainian operation in Russia's Kursk region. Brigade commander Oleh Apostol has claimed that the brigade only had three days to prepare for the operation.

The brigade entered Kursk Oblast on 10 August, and was given the task of conducting assaults and mop-up operations around Malaya Loknya and Pogrebki, in between the areas of responsibility of Ukraine's 80th and 82nd Air Assault Brigades. Units of the brigade completely encircled Malaya Loknya and gradually cleared the settlement; the operation to capture the village took about two weeks. There were over 100 Russian personnel in the village, according to a 95th Brigade commander. While certain units of the 95th were engaged at Malaya Loknya, its 1st Battalion took control of Pogrebki.

Throughout mid-to-late August 2024, it was reported that units of the brigade were still involved in combat operations at Malaya Loknya, including the battle at the prison in the village.

During mid-September 2024, some units of the 95th Brigade conducted a new breakthrough across the Russian border in the Glushkovo District of Kursk Oblast. The crossing of the border took place near the village of Medvezhe.

Units of the brigade were also responsible for capturing the Kursk Oblast villages of Kamyshevka and Khitrovka, which they continued to hold into October 2024. As of November 2024, the brigade had not lost any positions in its area of responsibility in Kursk Oblast. The brigade remained at Malaya Loknya into December 2024, where it repelled an attack that reportedly involved North Korean soldiers.

== Structure ==
As of 2023 the brigade's structure is as follows:

- 95th Air Assault Brigade, Zhytomyr
  - Headquarters & Headquarters Company
  - 1st Air Assault Battalion
  - 2nd Air Assault Battalion
  - 13th Amphibious Assault Battalion (Created in 1993 with primarily focus to participate in peacekeeping operations).
  - Artillery Group
    - Self-propelled Howitzer-Artillery Division (2S1 Gvozdika)
    - Howitzer Artillery Division (122 mm howitzer 2A18 (D-30))
    - Anti-Tank Battery
  - Tank Company (T-80BV)
  - Anti-Aircraft Artillery Battery
  - Reconnaissance Company
  - Engineering and Sapper Company
  - CBRN Protection Company
  - Logistic Company
  - Medical Company
  - Support Battalion
  - Amphibious Support Company
  - Commandant Platoon

== Commanders ==
- Major general Vitaly Raevsky
- Colonel Kinzerskiy
- Colonel Chabanenko
- Colonel Hortuyk
- Lieutenant Colonel Oleksandr Shvets (2008)
- Lieutenant Colonel Oleh Huliak
- Colonel Stanislav Chumak
- Colonel Mykhailo Zabrodsky (2013–2015)
- Colonel Oleh Hut (2015–2018)
- Colonel Maksym Myrhorodskyi (2018–2021)
- Dmytro Bratishko
- Colonel Oleh Apostol (as of 2024)

== Gallery ==
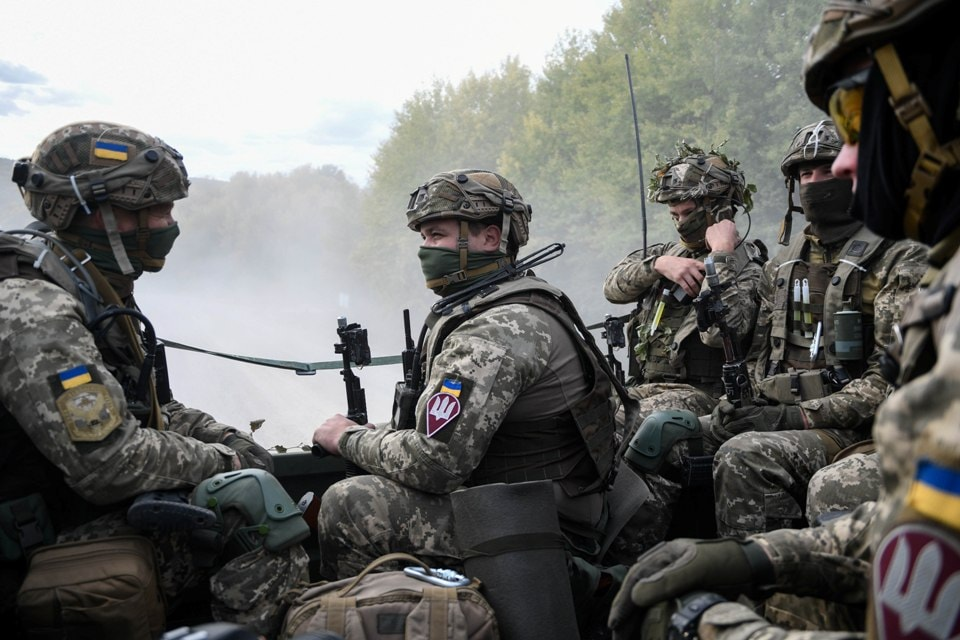
«Saber Junction-2018».

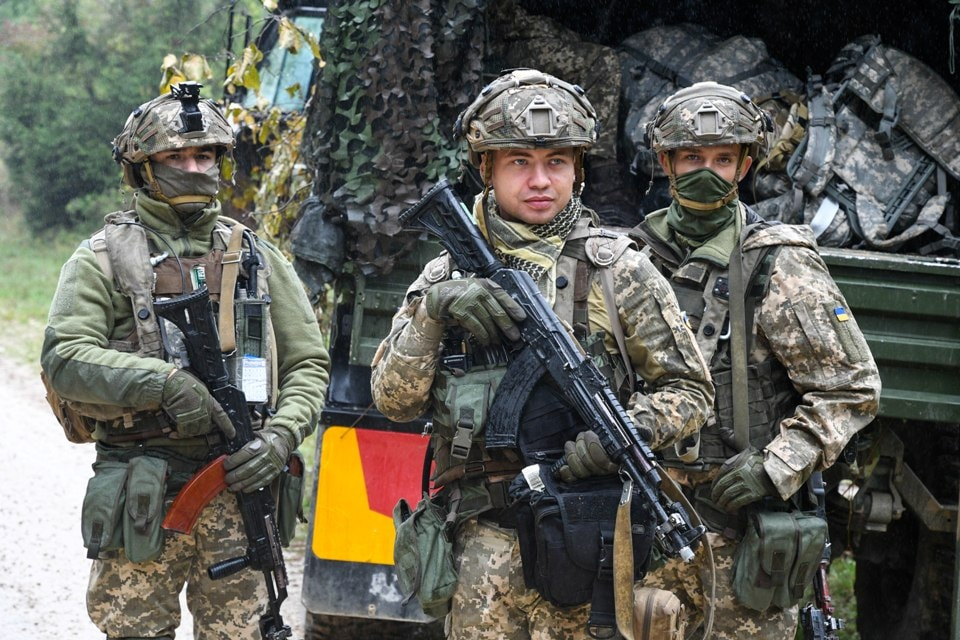
Brigade's soldiers prepare for movement during «Saber Junction-2018».

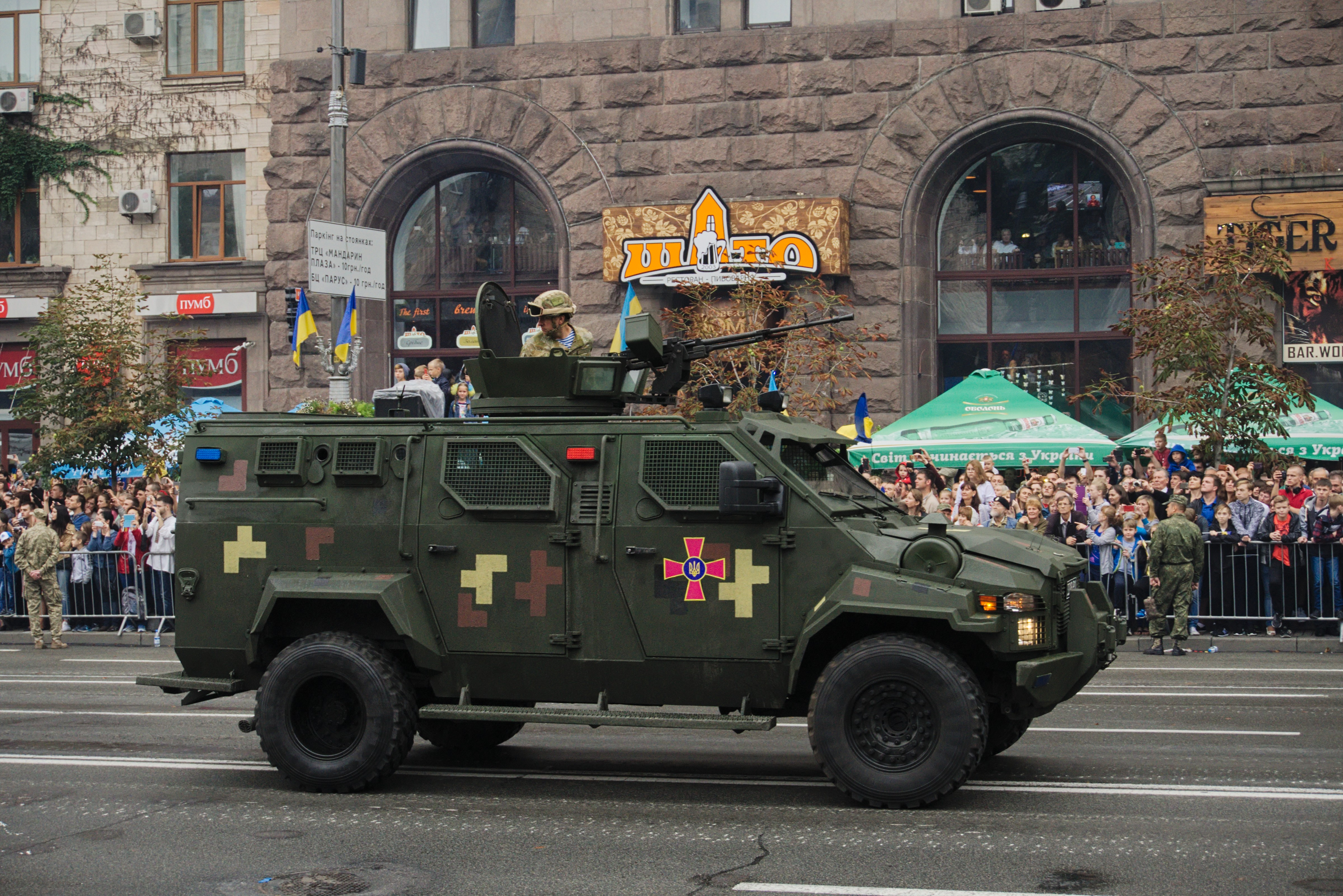
Brigade's KRAZ "Spartan" on Independence day parade, 2016.
