= Novoselivka, Lyman urban hromada, Kramatorsk Raion, Donetsk Oblast =

Urban locality in Donetsk Oblast, Ukraine

Novoselivka Новоселівка
- Rural settlement
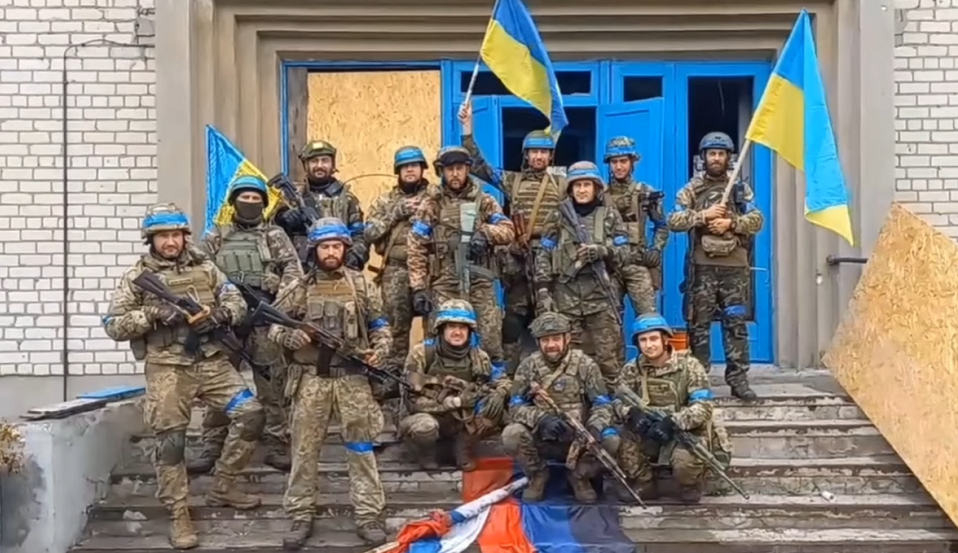
- Ukrainian military in Novoselvka, 2022

- Location of Novoselivka in Donetsk Oblast Novoselivka (Donetsk Oblast)
- Coordinates: 49°04′13″N 37°41′29″E
- Country: Ukraine
- Oblast: Donetsk Oblast
- Raion: Kramatorsk Raion
- Hromada: Lyman urban hromada

Area
  - Total: 2.88 km^{2} (1.11 sq mi)
- Elevation: 80 m (260 ft)

Population (2022)
  - Total: 1,223
  - Density: 425/km^{2} (1,100/sq mi)
- Time zone: UTC+2
  - Summer (DST): UTC+3
- Postal code: 84431
- Area code: +380 6261

Novoselivka (Ukrainian: Новоселівка) is a rural settlement in Kramatorsk Raion, Donetsk Oblast, eastern Ukraine. It is located on the Netrius River.

== History ==
An ancient settlement was found from the Khazar era in the area of the settlement. The Khazar settlement is considered one of the four largest early Middle Ages settlement in the middle area of the Donets. The area was then re-populated in the 17th century by immigrants from Right-Bank Ukraine, with the historical church, St. Gregory's Church, being built in the settlement in 1806. By 1885, there were over 2,000 residents in the village, although the number started to wane after residents were deported to Siberia and because of the subsequent Ukrainian War of Independence, which ended with Bolshevik control.

During the 2022 Russian invasion of Ukraine, the city was seized by Russian Armed Forces, before it was liberated on 28 September 2022 by members of the 81st Airmobile Brigade and the National Guard of Ukraine on the way to Lyman as part of the Lyman front. An estimate done by a resident after the liberation estimated that there were only 340 people remaining within Novoselivka. The village again became a contested area during Russian advances in late 2025 to early 2026. By June 2026, parts of the village became occupied by Russian forces again, with Ukrainian forces attempting to counterattack. Russian forces maintained control of the southern part of the village into August 2026.

== Local government ==
It is part of Lyman urban hromada, one of the hromadas of Ukraine. During the 2019 Ukrainian presidential election, 1,024 people of the settlement's population participated in the elections, with 42.86% voting for the pro-Russian Opposition Platform – For Life and 37.63% voting for the pro-European Servant of the People. In the subsequent parliamentary elections held later in July, the city's residents voted 35.18% for the Opposition Platform candidate Fedir Khrystenko and 27.64% for the Servant of the People candidate Rodion Voshchanov.

== Demographics ==
As of 2022, the population was estimated to be 1,223. This was down from the recorded 1,397 residents during the 2001 Ukrainian Census. The linguistic composition of the population in the settlement was as follows:

Native languages in Novoselivka
	percent
Ukrainian	92.6%
Russian	7.3%
others	0.1%
