= Zarichne, Donetsk Oblast =

Urban locality in Donetsk Oblast, Ukraine

Zarichne Зарiчне
- Rural settlement
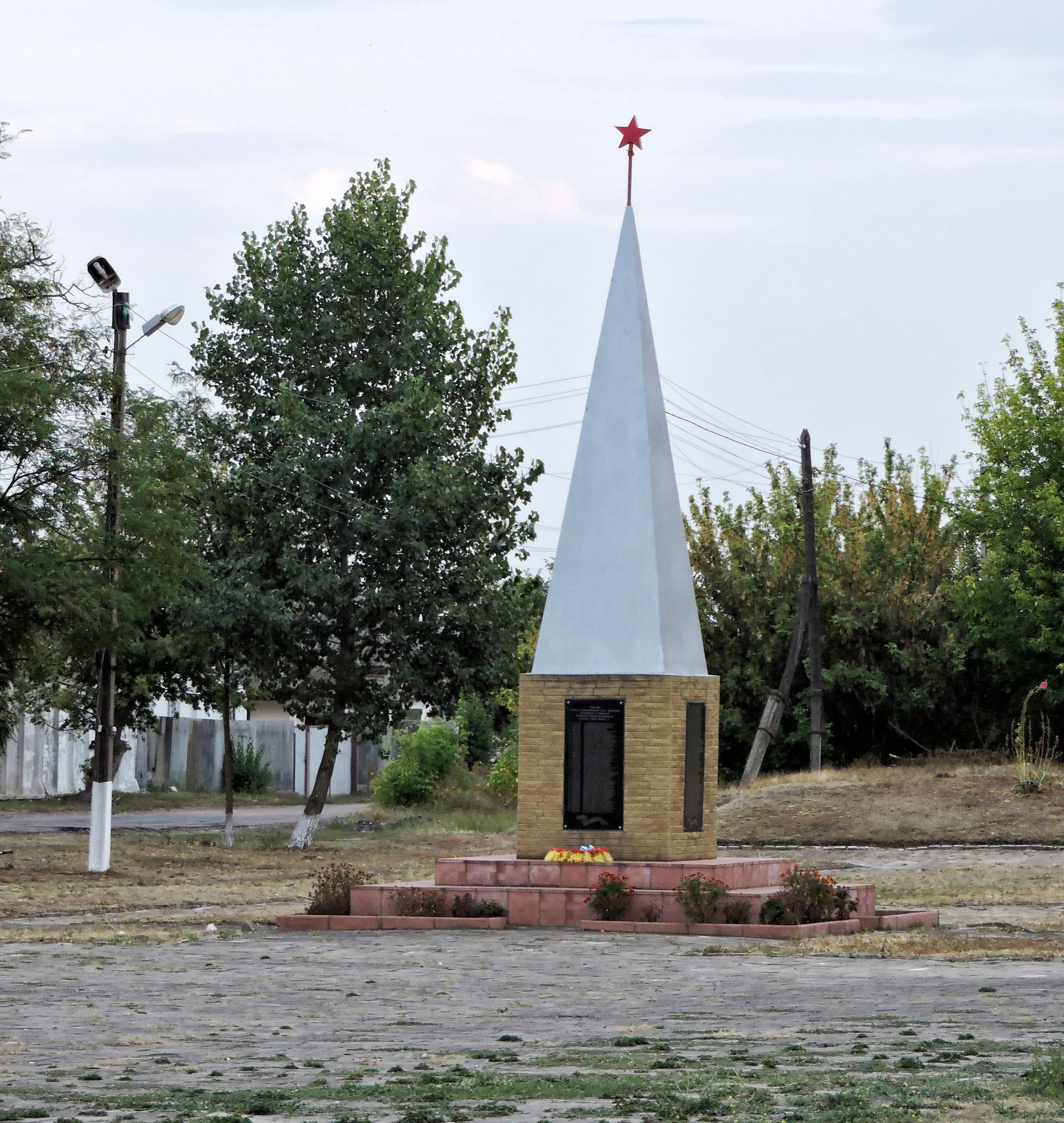
- Interactive map of Zarichne
- Location of Zarichne in Donetsk Oblast Zarichne (Donetsk Oblast)
- Coordinates: 49°01′10″N 37°55′15″E
- Country: Ukraine
- Oblast: Donetsk Oblast
- Raion: Kramatorsk Raion
- Hromada: Lyman urban hromada
- Elevation: 71 m (233 ft)

Population (2022)
  - Total: 2,367
- Time zone: UTC+2
  - Summer (DST): UTC+3
- Postal code: 84442—84443
- Area code: +380 6261

Zarichne (Ukrainian: Зарiчне), formerly Kirovsk (Ukrainian: Кіровськ), is a rural settlement in Kramatorsk Raion, Donetsk Oblast, Ukraine.

== History ==
In 2016, Kirovsk was renamed to Zarichne, conforming to the law prohibiting names of Communist origin. In September 2025, the village was captured by Russian forces.

== Demographics ==
As of 2022, the population was estimated to be 2,367, a decrease from 2,950 in 2001. The linguistic makeup of the population as of the census in 2001 was as follows:

Native languages in Zarichne
| | percent |
| Ukrainian | 89.0% |
| Russian | 9.7% |
| Romani | 0.9% |
| Romanian | 0.1% |
| others | 0.3% |
