= Katerynivka, Lyman urban hromada, Kramatorsk Raion, Donetsk Oblast =

Katerynivka Катеринівка
- Village
- Interactive map of Katerynivka
- Location of Katerynivka in Donetsk Oblast Katerynivka (Ukraine)
- Coordinates: 49.181944°N 37.865°E
- Country: Ukraine
- Oblast: Donetsk Oblast
- Raion: Kramatorsk Raion
- Hromada: Lyman urban hromada

Area
  - Total: 0.4 km^{2} (0.15 sq mi)
- Elevation: 139 m (456 ft)

Population (2001 census)
  - Total: 37
  - Density: 92/km^{2} (240/sq mi)
- Time zone: UTC+2 (EET)
  - Summer (DST): UTC+3 (EEST)
- Postal code: 75014
- Area code: +380 5547

Katerynivka (Ukrainian: Катеринівка; Russian: Катериновка) is a village in Lyman urban hromada, Kramatorsk Raion, Donetsk Oblast, Ukraine.

== History ==
=== Russian invasion of Ukraine ===
The village came under attack by Russian forces in 2022, during the Russian invasion of Ukraine, and was recaptured by Ukrainian forces by the end of September the same year.

== Local government ==
The settlement belongs to Lyman urban hromada.
