= Sosnove, Donetsk Oblast =

Rural settlement in Donetsk Oblast, Ukraine

Sosnove Соснове
- Rural settlement
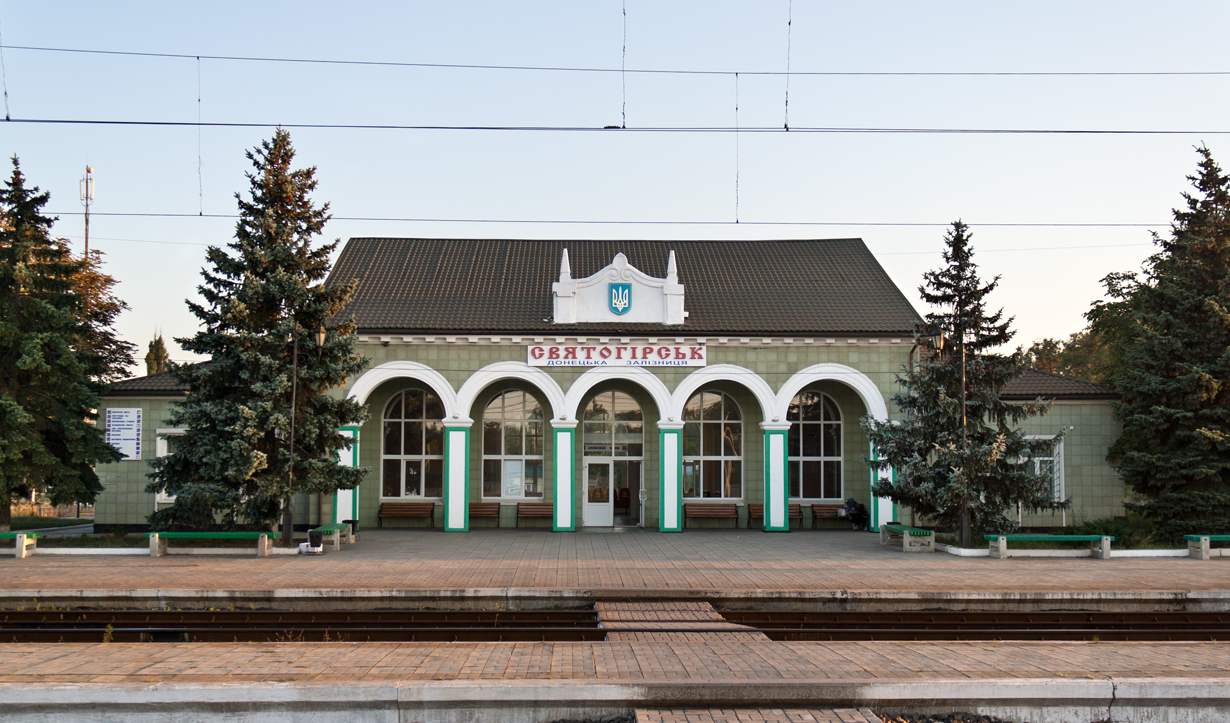
- Railway station
- Interactive map of Sosnove
- Location of Sosnove in Donetsk Oblast Sosnove (Ukraine)
- Coordinates: 49.071667°N 37.548056°E
- Country: Ukraine
- Oblast: Donetsk Oblast Donetsk Oblast
- Raion: Kramatorsk Raion

Area
  - Total: 0.24 km^{2} (0.093 sq mi)
- Elevation: 113 m (371 ft)

Population (2001 census)
  - Total: 174
  - Density: 720/km^{2} (1,900/sq mi)
- Time zone: UTC+2 (EET)
  - Summer (DST): UTC+3 (EEST)
- Postal code: 84432
- Area code: +380 6261

Sosnove (Ukrainian: Соснове; Russian: Сосновое) is a rural settlement in Kramatorsk Raion, Donetsk Oblast, eastern Ukraine.

== History ==
=== Russian invasion of Ukraine ===
The settlement came under attack by Russian forces during the Russian invasion of Ukraine in 2022 and was recaptured by Ukrainian forces in September the same year.

The village was completely destroyed as a result of the war.

== Local government ==
It belongs to Lyman urban hromada, one of the hromadas of Ukraine.
