= Novosadove =

Novosadove Новосадове
- Village
- Interactive map of Novosadove
- Location of Novosadove within Ukraine Novosadove (Donetsk Oblast)
- Coordinates: 49°07′36″N 37°58′14″E
- Country: Ukraine
- Oblast: Donetsk Oblast
- Raion: Kramatorsk Raion
- Hromada: Lyman urban hromada

Area
  - Total: 0.44 km^{2} (0.17 sq mi)
- Elevation: 79 m (259 ft)

Population (2001 census)
  - Total: 32
  - Density: 73/km^{2} (190/sq mi)
- Time zone: UTC+2 (EET)
  - Summer (DST): UTC+3 (EEST)
- Postal code: 84440
- Area code: +380 6261
- KATOTTH: UA14120110240041780

Novosadove (Ukrainian: Новосадове; Russian: Новосадовое) is a village in Lyman urban hromada, Kramatorsk Raion, Donetsk Oblast, eastern Ukraine.

== History ==
=== Russian invasion of Ukraine ===
During the initial eastern campaign of the 2022 Russian invasion of Ukraine, the village was temporarily occupied by Russian forces and recaptured by the Armed Forces of Ukraine on 24 October 2022. Novosadove was once again captured by Russian forces by the end of October 2024.

== Demographics ==
In 2001 the settlement had 32 inhabitants, whose native languages were 90.63% Ukrainian and 9.38% Russian.
