= Novomykhailivka, Kramatorsk Raion, Donetsk Oblast =

Novomykhailivka Новомихайлівка
- Village
- Location within Donetsk Oblast Location within Ukraine
- Coordinates: 49°12′11″N 37°52′8″E
- Country: Ukraine
- Oblast: Donetsk Oblast
- Raion: Kramatorsk Raion
- Hromada: Lyman urban hromada
- Elevation: 142 m (466 ft)

Population
  - Total: 22
- Postal code: 84422
- Area code: +380-6261

Novomykhailivka (Ukrainian: Новомихайлівка) is a village located in Kramatorsk Raion of Donetsk Oblast, eastern Ukraine.

== History ==
=== Russian invasion of Ukraine ===
During the Russian invasion of Ukraine, the village was reportedly occupied by Russia on 24 June 2025.

The village was recaptured from Russian occupation on August 24, 2025.

== Local government ==
Administratively, it is part of Lyman urban hromada, one of the hromadas of Ukraine.

== See also ==
- List of villages in Donetsk Oblast
