= Nove, Donetsk Oblast =

Rural settlement in Donetsk Oblast, Ukraine

Nove Нове
- Rural settlement
- Interactive map of Nove
- Location of Nove in Donetsk Oblast Nove (Ukraine)
- Coordinates: 49.1625°N 37.830556°E
- Country: Ukraine
- Oblast: Donetsk Oblast
- Raion: Kramatorsk Raion
- Hromada: Lyman urban hromada

Area
  - Total: 1.9 km^{2} (0.73 sq mi)
- Elevation: 157 m (515 ft)

Population (2001 census)
  - Total: 880
  - Density: 460/km^{2} (1,200/sq mi)
- Time zone: UTC+2 (EET)
  - Summer (DST): UTC+3 (EEST)
- Postal code: 84422
- Area code: +380 6261

Nove (Ukrainian: Нове; Russian: Новое, romanized: Novoye) is a rural settlement (selyshche) in Kramatorsk Raion in Donetsk Oblast of eastern Ukraine.

== History ==
=== Russian invasion of Ukraine ===
The village came under attack by Russian forces in 2022, during the Russian invasion of Ukraine, and was recaptured by Ukrainian forces in the end of September the same year. The settlement was again captured by Russian forces in April 2025.

In August 2026, the ISW reported that Ukrainian forces had likely retaken the settlement.
