= Zelena Dolyna, Donetsk Oblast =

Ukrainian village

Zelena Dolyna Зелена Долина
- Village
- Location within Donetsk Oblast Location within Ukraine
- Coordinates: 49°07′49″N 37°48′24″E
- Country: Ukraine
- Oblast: Donetsk Oblast
- Raion: Kramatorsk Raion
- Hromada: Lyman urban hromada

Population
  - Estimate (2021): 89
- Time zone: UTC+2 (EET)
  - Summer (DST): UTC+3 (EEST)
- Postal Code: 84422
- Area code: +380 6261

Zelena Dolyna (Ukrainian: Зелена Долина) is a village in Kramatorsk Raion of Donetsk Oblast in Ukraine.

== History ==
=== Russian invasion of Ukraine ===
During the Russo-Ukrainian War, Russian forces occupied the village from April to September 2022. Ukrainian forces reestablished control over the village by 28 September 2022 as part of an advance towards Lyman.

But the trend reversed and the Russian army resumed its offensive in the following months. On 8 July 2025, Russian armed forces recaptured the entire village of Zelena Dolyna.

On September 12, 2026, Ukrainian forces recaptured the village as part of Operation Vivaldi.

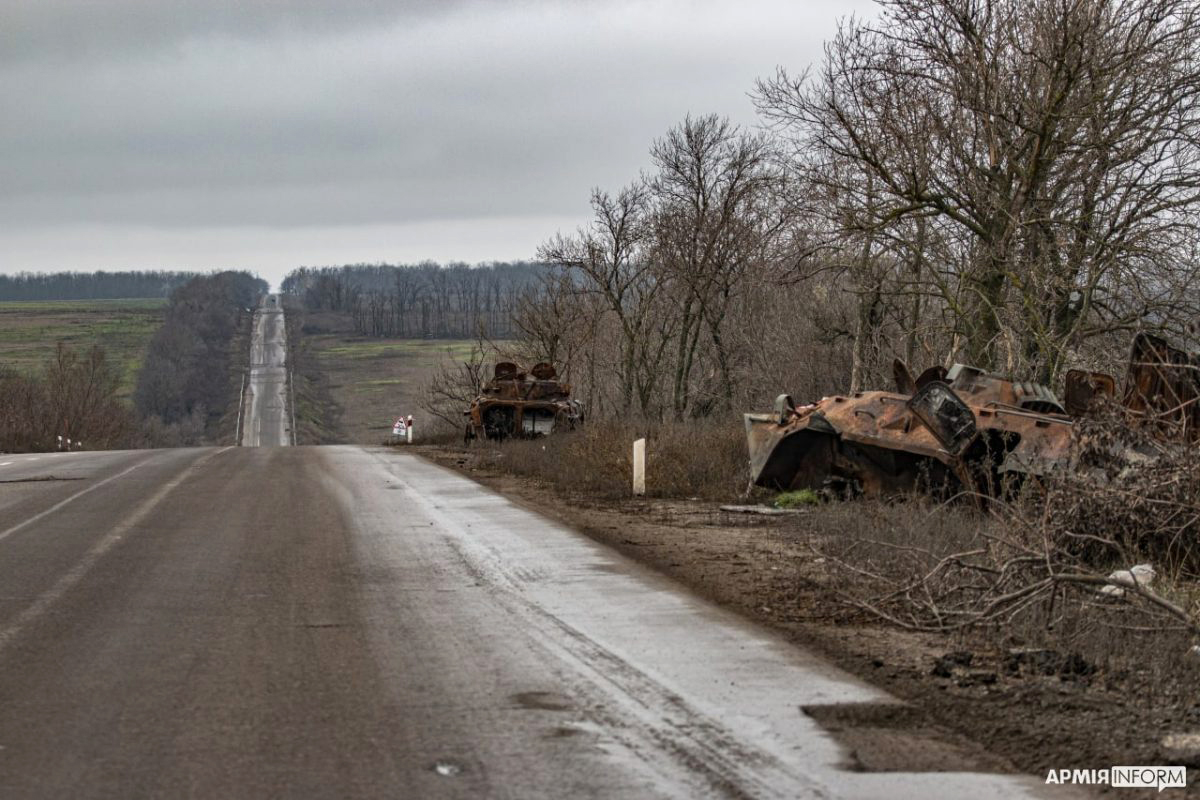
Destroyed military vehicles near Dolyna in December 2022

== Local government ==
The body of local self-government is the Lyman settlement hromada.

== Demographics ==
The population as of 2021 is 89 people

As of the 2001 Ukrainian Census, the native language distribution of the population is as follows:

Native languages in Zelena Dolyna
| | percent |
| Ukrainian | 86.9% |
| Russian | 12.5% |
| Others | 0.6% |
