= Lyman urban hromada =

Lyman urban hromada Лиманська міська громада
- Hromada
- Interactive map of Lyman urban hromada
- Country: Ukraine
- Oblast: Donetsk
- Raion: Kramatorsk
- Admin. center: Lyman

Area
  - Total: 1,205.4 km^{2} (465.4 sq mi)

Population (2020)
  - Total: 41,066
  - Density: 34.068/km^{2} (88.237/sq mi)
- Settlements: 40
- Cities: 1
- Rural settlements: 4
- Villages: 30
- Towns: 5

Lyman urban hromada (Ukrainian: Лиманська міська громада) is a hromada of Ukraine, located in Kramatorsk Raion, Donetsk Oblast. Its administrative center is the city of Lyman.

It has an area of 1,205.4 square kilometres (465.4 mi^{2}) and a population of 41,066, as of 2020.

== Settlements ==
The hromada contains 40 settlements:

=== 1 city ===
- Lyman

=== 5 urban-type settlements ===
- Drobysheve
- Zarichne
- Novoselivka
- Yampil
- Yarova

=== 30 villages ===
- Brusivka
- Vovchiy Yar
- Derylove
- Dibrova
- Zakitne
- Zelena Dolyna
- Ivanivka
- Kaleniki
- Karpivka
- Katerynivka
- Kolodiazi
- Korovii Yar
- Kryva Luka
- Krymky
- Lypove
- Lozove
- Novomykhailivka
- Novosadove
- Ozerne
- Oleksandrivka
- Ridkodub
- Rubtsi
- Serednye
- Staryi Karavan
- Terny
- Torske
- Shandryholove
- Shchurove
- Yampolivka
- Yatskivka

=== 4 rural-type settlements ===
- Nove
- Sosnove
- Stavky
- Myrne

== See also ==
- List of hromadas of Ukraine
