= Staryi Karavan =

Village in Donetsk Oblast, Ukraine

Staryi Karavan Старий Караван
- Village
- Interactive map of Staryi Karavan
- Staryi Karavan in the Donetsk Oblast Staryi Karavan (Ukraine)
- Coordinates: 48.916111°N 37.784722°E
- Country: Ukraine
- Oblast: Donetsk Oblast
- Raion: Kramatorsk Raion

Area
  - Total: 0.56 km^{2} (0.22 sq mi)
- Elevation: 73 m (240 ft)

Population (2001 census)
  - Total: 191
  - Density: 340/km^{2} (880/sq mi)
- Time zone: UTC+2 (EET)
  - Summer (DST): UTC+3 (EEST)
- Postal code: 84460
- Area code: +380 6261

Staryi Karavan (Ukrainian: Старий Караван; Russian: Старый Караван) is a village in Kramatorsk Raion in Donetsk Oblast of eastern Ukraine.

The city is located on a bank of the Siverskyi Donets river, which separates the village from Raihorodok.

== History ==
=== War in Donbas ===
At the beginning of July 2014, during the war in Donbas, the village was liberated from pro-Russian separatists by Ukrainian forces.

=== Russian invasion of Ukraine ===
At the end of May 2022, the village was captured by the Russian Armed Forces.

Footage posted on 5 September 2022 depicted Ukrainian troops in Staryi Karavan, which the Institute for the Study of War suggested was indicative of an "infiltration reconnaissance mission" or a "limited counterattack" by Ukrainian forces, which had likely reduced Russian control over the village.

== Local government ==
It belongs to Lyman urban hromada, one of the hromadas of Ukraine.
