= Ozerne, Donetsk Oblast =

Village in Donetsk Oblast, Ukraine

Ozerne Озерне
- Village
- Interactive map of Ozerne
- Location of Ozerne within Ukraine Ozerne (Ukraine)
- Coordinates: 48.898611°N 38.090833°E
- Country: Ukraine
- Oblast: Donetsk Oblast
- Raion: Kramatorsk Raion
- Status: 1949

Area
  - Total: 1.31 km^{2} (0.51 sq mi)
- Elevation: 59 m (194 ft)

Population (2001 census)
  - Total: 263
  - Estimate (2020): 194
  - Density: 201/km^{2} (520/sq mi)
- Time zone: UTC+2 (EET)
  - Summer (DST): UTC+3 (EEST)
- Postal code: 84464
- Area code: +380 6261

Ozerne (Ukrainian: Озерне; Russian: Озёрное; until 1949 Haylivka (Хайлівка), from 1949 to 2016 Illichivka (Іллічівка)) is a village in Kramatorsk Raion in Donetsk Oblast of eastern Ukraine.

== History ==
=== Russian invasion of Ukraine ===
The village was captured from Russian forces in September 2022, during the Russian invasion of Ukraine. Ozerne was freed from Russian occupation in October 2022 as part of the Kharkiv counteroffensive.

== Local government ==
It belongs to Lyman urban hromada, one of the hromadas of Ukraine.
