= Terny, Kramatorsk Raion, Donetsk Oblast =

Village in Donetsk Oblast, Ukraine

Terny Терни
- Village
- Interactive map of Terny
- Location of Terny in Donetsk Oblast Terny (Ukraine)
- Coordinates: 49.095833°N 37.964167°E
- Country: Ukraine
- Oblast: Donetsk Oblast
- Raion: Kramatorsk Raion
- Hromada: Lyman urban hromada

Area
  - Total: 2.52 km^{2} (0.97 sq mi)
- Elevation: 77 m (253 ft)

Population (2001 census)
  - Total: 764
  - Density: 303/km^{2} (785/sq mi)
- Time zone: UTC+2 (EET)
  - Summer (DST): UTC+3 (EEST)
- Postal code: 84440
- Area code: +380 6261

Terny (Ukrainian: Терни; Russian: Терны) is a village in Kramatorsk Raion in Donetsk Oblast of eastern Ukraine.

== History ==
=== Russian invasion of Ukraine ===
The settlement came under attack by Russian forces during the Russian invasion of Ukraine in 2022, and was recaptured by Ukrainian forces by the end of September the same year.

Fighting renewed over the village in October 2024. Russia had claimed to have captured it on 14 January 2025. By 19 January 2025, the settlement was confirmed to have been captured by Russia.

== Local government ==
The settlement belongs to Lyman urban hromada.

== Demographics ==
Native languages according to the 2001 Ukrainian census:

Native languages in Terny
Languages	percent
Ukrainian	92.8%
Russian	7.2%
