= Shchurove =

Village in Donetsk Oblast, Ukraine

Shchurove Щурове
- Village
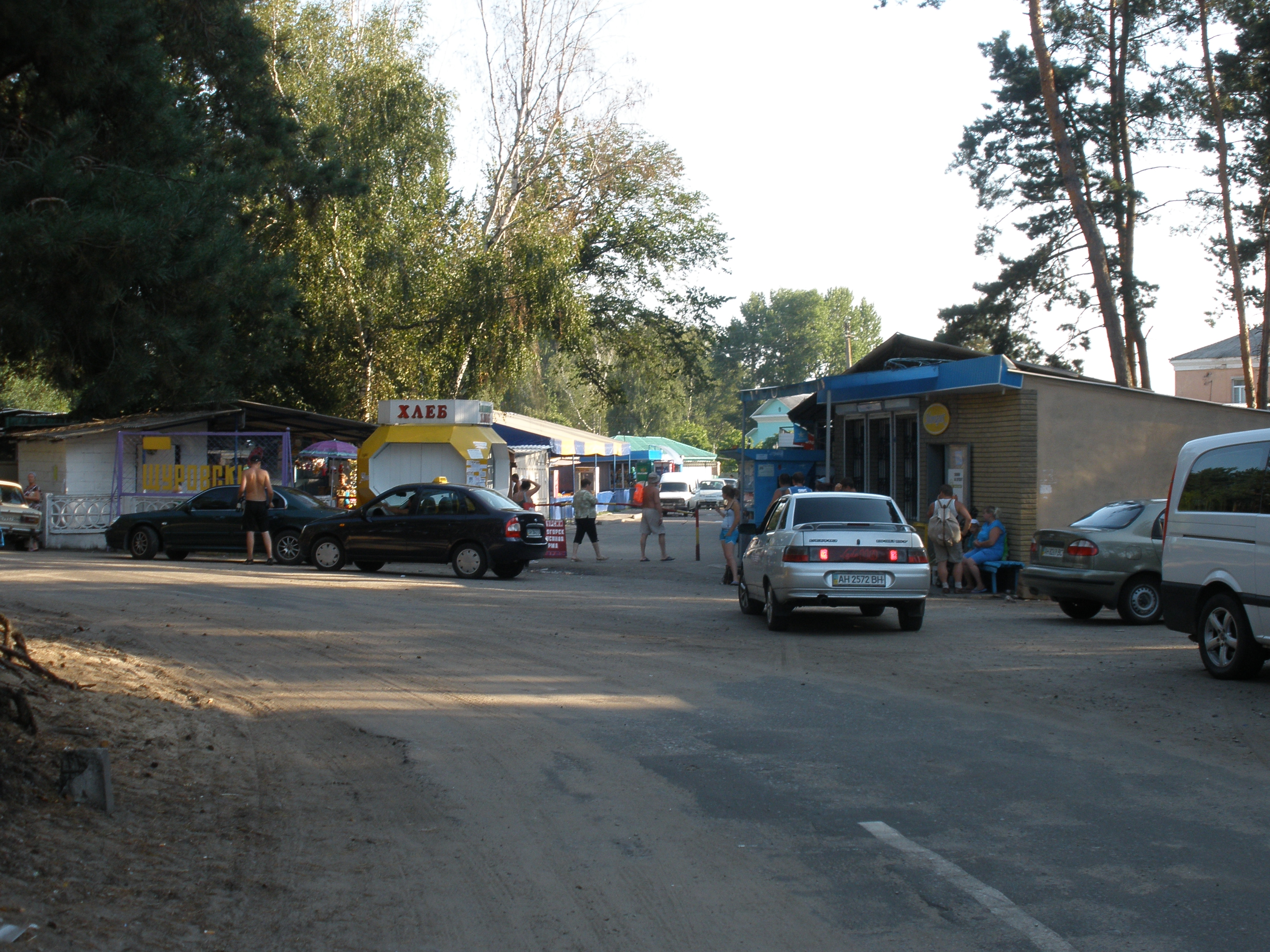
- Interactive map of Shchurove
- Shchurove in the Donetsk Oblast Shchurove (Ukraine)
- Coordinates: 48.96108°N 37.71581°E
- Country: Ukraine
- Oblast: Donetsk Oblast
- Raion: Kramatorsk Raion
- Founded: 1791

Area
  - Total: 0.07 km^{2} (0.027 sq mi)
- Elevation: 66 m (217 ft)

Population (2001 census)
  - Total: 264
  - Density: 3,800/km^{2} (9,800/sq mi)
- Time zone: UTC+2 (EET)
  - Summer (DST): UTC+3 (EEST)
- Postal code: 84453
- Area code: +380 6261

Shchurove (Ukrainian: Щурове; Russian: Щурово) is a village in Kramatorsk Raion in Donetsk Oblast of eastern Ukraine.

The village is located on a bank of the Siverskyi Donets river.

== Local government ==
It belongs to Lyman urban hromada, one of the hromadas of Ukraine.
