= Drobysheve =

Drobysheve Дробишеве
- Rural settlement
- Interactive map of Drobysheve
- Location of Drobysheve within Ukraine Drobysheve (Ukraine)
- Coordinates: 49.041667°N 37.724167°E
- Country: Ukraine
- Oblast: Donetsk Oblast
- Raion: Kramatorsk Raion
- Hromada: Lyman urban hromada
- Founded: 1687

Area
  - Total: 8.47 km^{2} (3.27 sq mi)
- Elevation: 106 m (348 ft)

Population (2001 census)
  - Total: 869
  - Density: 103/km^{2} (266/sq mi)
- Time zone: UTC+2 (EET)
  - Summer (DST): UTC+3 (EEST)
- Postal code: 84450
- Area code: +380 6261

Drobysheve (Ukrainian: Дробишеве, pronounced [ˈdrɔbɪʃewe]) is a rural settlement in eastern Ukraine, located in Kramatorsk Raion of Donetsk Oblast.

== History ==
=== Russian invasion of Ukraine ===
The settlement came under attack by Russian forces during the Russian invasion of Ukraine in 2022, and was occupied until it was recaptured by Ukrainian forces during the Kharkiv counteroffensive on 30 September 2022.

== Demographics ==
As of 2022, the population was estimated to be 2,578.

As of the 2001 Ukrainian census, the Drobysheve had a population of 3,635 inhabitants. The linguistic composition was as follows:

Native languages in Drobysheve
	percent
Ukrainian	87.6%
Russian	12.0%
Belarusian	0.2%
Romanian	0.1%
others	0.1%
