= Oleksandrivka, Kramatorsk urban hromada, Kramatorsk Raion, Donetsk Oblast =

Oleksandrivka Олександрівка Александровка
- Rural settlement
- Location of Oleksandrivka Oleksandrivka (Ukraine)
- Coordinates: 48°44′52″N 37°27′13″E
- Country: Ukraine
- Oblast: Donetsk Oblast
- Raion: Kramatorsk Raion

Area
  - Total: 0.38 km^{2} (0.15 sq mi)
- Elevation: 92 m (302 ft)

Population (2022)
  - Total: 416
  - Density: 1,100/km^{2} (2,800/sq mi)
- Time zone: UTC+2 (EET)
  - Summer (DST): UTC+3 (EEST)
- Postal code: 84393
- Area code: +380 626

Oleksandrivka (Ukrainian: Олександрівка) is a rural settlement in Kramatorsk Raion in Donetsk Oblast of eastern Ukraine. The Kramatorsk Reservoir (Краматорське водосховище) extends to the western edge of the town. Population: 416 (2022 estimate)

== Demographics ==
Native language as of the Ukrainian Census of 2001:

- Ukrainian 21.58%
- Russian 78.42%
