= Andriivka rural hromada =

Andriivka rural hromada Андріївська сільська громада
- Hromada
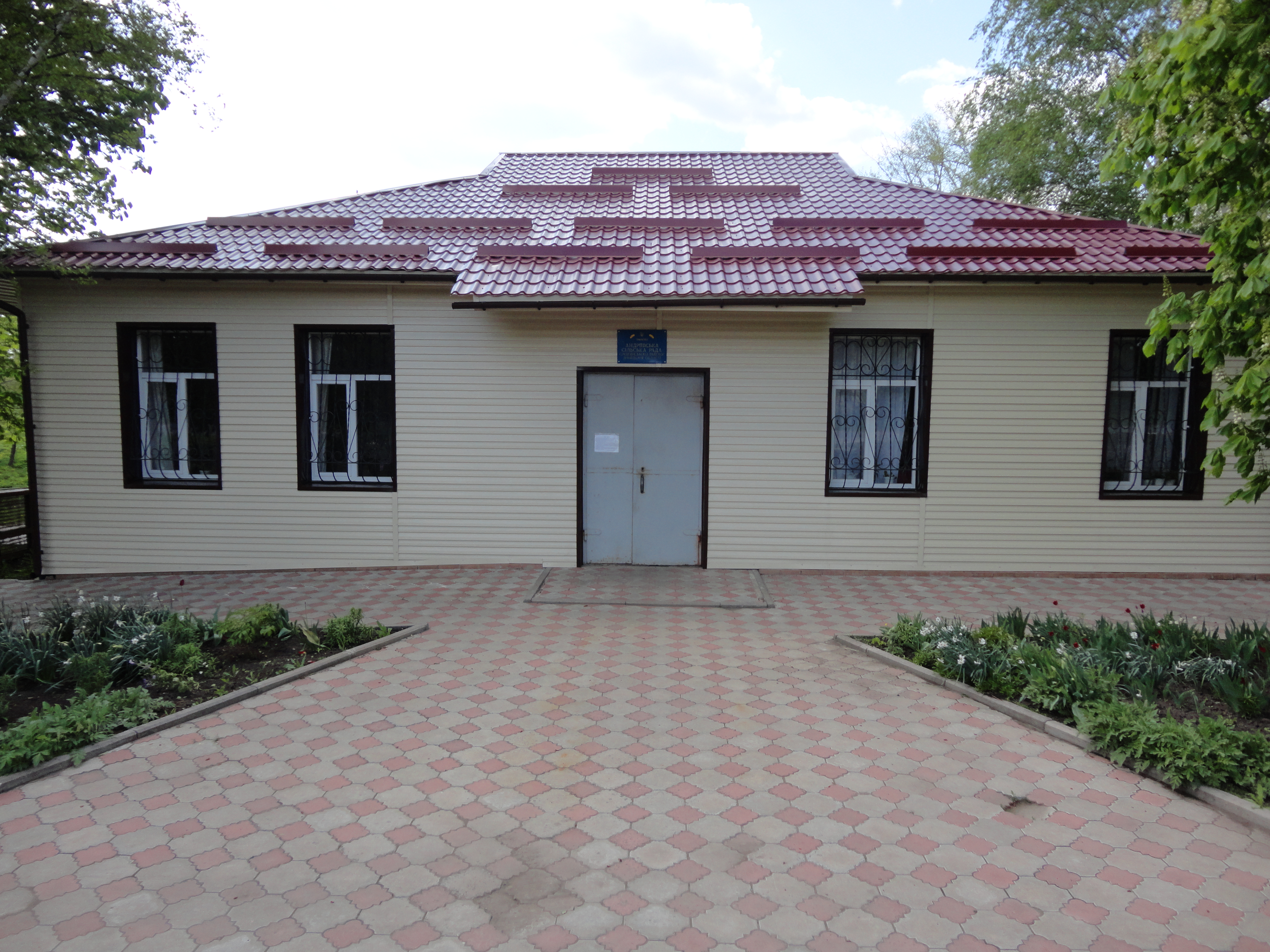
- Andriivka Village Administration
- Interactive map of Andriivka rural hromada
- Country: Ukraine
- Oblast: Donetsk Oblast
- Raion: Kramatorsk Raion

Area
  - Total: 159.6 km^{2} (61.6 sq mi)

Population (2020)
  - Total: 2,230
  - Density: 14.0/km^{2} (36.2/sq mi)
- Settlements: 5
- Villages: 5

Andriivka rural hromada (Ukrainian: Андріївська сільська громада) is a hromada of Ukraine, located in Kramatorsk Raion, Donetsk Oblast. Its administrative center is the village of Andriivka.

It has an area of 159.6 square kilometres (61.6 mi^{2}) and a population of 2230, as of 2020.

The hromada contains 5 settlements, which are all villages:

- Andriivka
- Novoandriivka
- Rohanske
- Serhiivka
- Varvarivka

== See also ==
- List of hromadas of Ukraine
