= Torske, Donetsk Oblast =

Village in Donetsk Oblast, Ukraine

Torske Торське
- Village
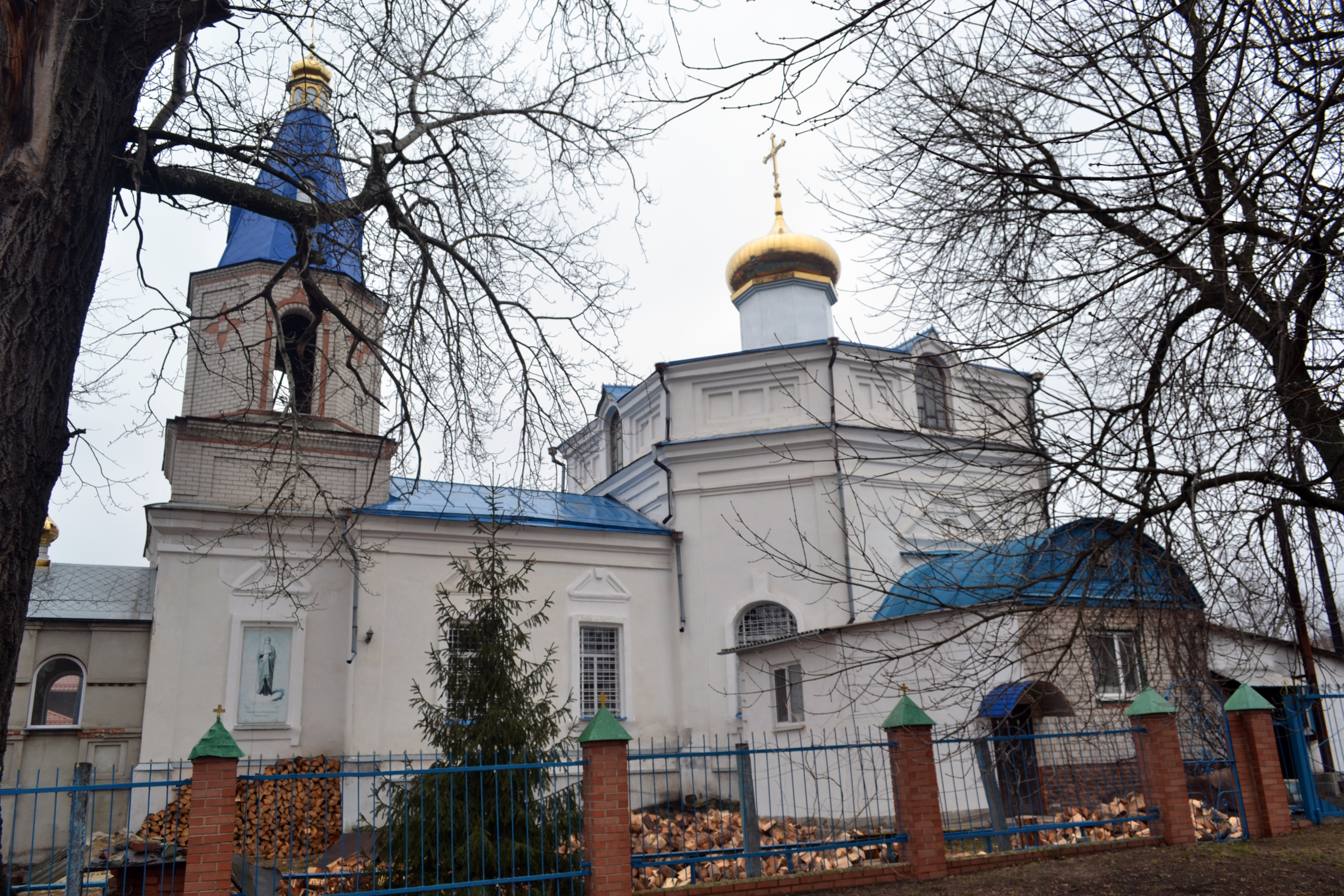
- A church
- Interactive map of Torske
- Location of Torske in Donetsk Oblast Torske (Ukraine)
- Coordinates: 49.015°N 37.964444°E
- Country: Ukraine
- Oblast: Donetsk Oblast
- Raion: Kramatorsk Raion

Area
  - Total: 5.04 km^{2} (1.95 sq mi)
- Elevation: 69 m (226 ft)

Population (2001 census)
  - Total: 1,652
  - Density: 328/km^{2} (849/sq mi)
- Time zone: UTC+2 (EET)
  - Summer (DST): UTC+3 (EEST)
- Postal code: 84444
- Area code: +380 6261

Torske (Ukrainian: Торське; Russian: Торское) is a village in Kramatorsk Raion in Donetsk Oblast of eastern Ukraine.

== History ==
=== Russian invasion of Ukraine ===
During the Russian invasion of Ukraine in 2022, the settlement came under attack, and was captured by Russian forces in late-April 2022. During Ukraine's 2022 Kharkiv counteroffensive, which extended into parts of the northern Donetsk oblast, Ukrainian troops recaptured the settlement from Russian and DPR forces in early-October.

The settlement was later attacked on several occasions by Russian forces in December 2022, but remained under Ukrainian control. Since 25 August 2025, the village is under Russian occupation.

== Local government ==
It belongs to Lyman urban hromada, one of the hromadas of Ukraine.
