= Karpivka, Lyman urban hromada, Kramatorsk Raion, Donetsk Oblast =

Village in Donetsk Oblast, Ukraine

Karpivka Карпівка
- Village
- Interactive map of Karpivka
- Karpivka in Donetsk Oblast Karpivka (Ukraine)
- Coordinates: 49.175°N 37.726111°E
- Country: Ukraine
- Oblast: Donetsk Oblast
- Raion: Kramatorsk Raion
- Established: 1788

Area
  - Total: 2.2 km^{2} (0.85 sq mi)
- Elevation: 108 m (354 ft)

Population (2001 census)
  - Total: 396
  - Density: 180/km^{2} (470/sq mi)
- Time zone: UTC+2 (EET)
  - Summer (DST): UTC+3 (EEST)
- Postal code: 84421
- Area code: +380 6261

Karpivka (Ukrainian: Карпівка; Russian: Карповка) is a village in Kramatorsk Raion in Donetsk Oblast of eastern Ukraine.

== History ==
=== Russian invasion of Ukraine ===
The settlement came under attack by Russian forces during the Russian invasion of Ukraine in 2022.

== Local government ==
It belongs to Lyman Urban Hromada, one of the hromadas of Ukraine.
