= Oleksandrivka, Lyman urban hromada, Kramatorsk Raion, Donetsk Oblast =

Oleksandrivka Олександрівка Александровка
- Village
- Location of Oleksandrivka Oleksandrivka (Ukraine)
- Coordinates: 49°6′56″N 37°35′25″E
- Country: Ukraine
- Oblast: Donetsk Oblast
- Raion: Kramatorsk Raion
- Elevation: 136 m (446 ft)

Population (2001)
  - Total: 499
- Time zone: UTC+2 (EET)
  - Summer (DST): UTC+3 (EEST)
- Postal code: 84433
- Area code: +380 6261

Oleksandrivka (Ukrainian: Олександрівка) is a village in Kramatorsk Raion in Donetsk Oblast of eastern Ukraine.

== Demographics ==
As of the 2001 Ukrainian census, the settlement had 499 inhabitants. he native languages in the settlement were as follows:

Native languages in Oleksandrivka
	percent
Ukrainian	71.74%
Russian	10.42%
Belarusian	0.61%
Others	17.23%
