= Korovii Yar =

Village in Donetsk Oblast, Ukraine

Korovii Yar Коровій Яр
- Village
- Interactive map of Korovii Yar
- Korovii Yar in Donetsk Oblast Korovii Yar (Ukraine)
- Coordinates: 49.155°N 37.626944°E
- Country: Ukraine
- Oblast: Donetsk Oblast
- Raion: Kramatorsk Raion
- Founded: 1788

Area
  - Total: 1.99 km^{2} (0.77 sq mi)
- Elevation: 124 m (407 ft)

Population (2001 census)
  - Total: 696
  - Estimate (2022): 90
  - Density: 350/km^{2} (906/sq mi)
- Time zone: UTC+2 (EET)
  - Summer (DST): UTC+3 (EEST)
- Postal code: 84413
- Area code: +380 6261

Korovii Yar (Ukrainian: Коровій Яр; Russian: Коровий Яр) is a village in Kramatorsk Raion in Donetsk Oblast of eastern Ukraine.

== History ==
=== Russian invasion of Ukraine ===
The village came under attack by Russian forces in 2022, during the Russian invasion of Ukraine.

== Local government ==
It belongs to Lyman urban hromada, one of the hromadas of Ukraine.

== Demographics ==
As of the 2001 Ukrainian census, the settlement had 696 inhabitants. Their native languages were 55.89% Ukrainian and 43.69% Russian.

== Notable people ==
- Karpo Sergey Eduardovich
- Artur Oleksandrovych Rozhkov
