= Donetsk Railway Transport Institute =

Educational institute in Donetsk

Coordinates: 48.0405°N 37.7480°E

Donetsk railway transport institute Ukrainian State University of Railway Transport
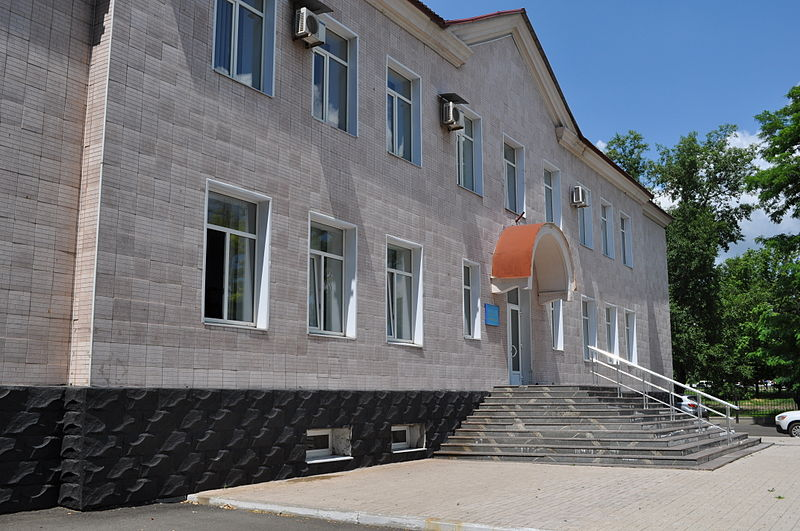
- The 5th department of the Railway Institute
- Other name: Донецький інститут залізничного транспорту Українського державного університету залізничного транспорту
- Established: 3 November 1967
- Chair: Rector Mikhail Cheptsov
- Staff: 350
- Address: 184 Artema St, Donetsk
- Location: Donetsk, Ukraine
- Website: drti.donbass.com

The Donetsk Railway Transport Institute (DRTI) (Ukrainian: Донецький інститут залізничного транспорту Українського державного університету залізничного транспорту; Russian: Донецкий институт железнодорожного транспорта, ДонИЖТ) is an educational institute in Donetsk, Ukraine, that trains professionals to work in different departments of the railway. The Institute trains more than 3,000 full-time and part-time students.

== History ==
Kharkov Institute of Railway Engineers’ Educational and Consulting Center (ECC) was opened in Donetsk in 1967, and on January 1, 1968, transformed into Donetsk Branch of Kharkov Institute of Railway Engineers according to the order of the Minister of Railways (nowadays Ukrainian State Academy of Railway Transport) to improve the engineers’ training for the Donetsk Railway. The success of the institute staff’s work received recognition and by the order of the Cabinet of Ministers of Ukraine the Institute was transformed into Donetsk Railway Transport Institute (DRTI) of Ukrainian State Academy of Railway Transport.

DRTI founded by an initiative of Donetsk Railway in 1967 has transformed from the Branch of Kharkov Institute of Railway Engineers to the Donetsk Railway Transport Institute (DRTI) of Ukrainian State Academy of Railway Transport during 45 years of its development.

== Faculties and degree programs ==
The teaching staff of the Institute includes 100 teachers; among them 70 have PhD degrees (7 Doctors of Science and professors, 63 Candidates of Science and assistant- professors).

- Infrastructure of railway transport Faculty
- Department of Automation, Telemechanics, Connection and Computer Science
- Department of Engineering and Maintenance of Tracks and Constructions
- Higher Mathematics and Physics Department
- Department of Electrotechnical Systems of Power Consumption
- Transport Economy Faculty
- Enterprises Economy Department
- Management Department
- Accounting and Auditing Department
- Economy Theory and General Economic Disciplines Department
- Department of Social and Humanity Disciplines
- Railway Operation on Transport Faculty
- Department of Organization of Traffic & Transport Operation Control on the Railway Transport
- Railway Rolling Stock Department
- Theoretical and Applied Mechanics Department
- Correspondence Faculty
- Retraining and Upgrading Qualification Faculty
- Preparatory Faculty

Retraining and Upgrading Qualification faculty organizes:

- Upgrading qualification training of railway transport leaders and specialists;
- Training and knowledge testing of officials in labour protection;
- Professional technical training of working professions.

Donetsk Railway Transport Institute offers Bachelor and Specialist degrees in the following fields of training and specializations:

- Organization of Traffic & Transport Operation Control (Railway Transport)
- Rolling Stock and Special Machinery of Railway Transport;
- Automation and Telemechanics on Transport
- Railway Structures and Track Facilities
- Enterprises Economy
- Accounting and Audit
- Management of Organizations

== Facilities ==
DRTI consists of five academic buildings, a student hostel with 300 seats, two gyms and two fields, a teaching and laboratory building for mechanical specialities.

== Research ==
DRTI is one of the centers of the railway science in Donetsk region. The important part of the institute’s activity is the research work. Main demands of the research work are the Ministry of Transport and Connection of Ukraine, Donetsk railways and industrial enterprises of the Donetsk region. The research work in DRTI is oriented to future students and graduate students. The defence of doctoral and master's work is stipulated as one of the results of scientific research.

The scientific research of the Institute is focused on the improvement and development of new technologies in railway transport and is conducted in the following areas:

- Environmental protection and reduce of diesel engines’ emissions
- Improvement of the efficiency of diesel operating
- Increase of efficiency of load-lifting and commercial work on the railway>
- Development of new efficient technologies of current maintenance and repair of railway tracks
- Application of computer technologies in automation systems and transport connection
- Automation of operational control trains’ movement systems
- Management and marketing of transport services
- Economics and organization of railway transportation
