= Kolodiazi =

Village in Donetsk Oblast, Ukraine

Kolodiazi Колодязі
- Village
- Interactive map of Kolodiazi
- Location of Kolodiazi in Donetsk Oblast Kolodiazi (Ukraine)
- Coordinates: 49°5′12″N 37°53′12″E
- Country: Ukraine
- Oblast: Donetsk Oblast
- Raion: Kramatorsk Raion

Area
  - Total: 0.98 km^{2} (0.38 sq mi)
- Elevation: 104 m (341 ft)

Population (2001 census)
  - Total: 340
  - Density: 350/km^{2} (900/sq mi)
- Time zone: UTC+2 (EET)
  - Summer (DST): UTC+3 (EEST)
- Postal code: 84441
- Area code: +380 6261

Kolodiazi (Ukrainian: Колодязі; Russian: Колодези) is a village in Kramatorsk Raion in Donetsk Oblast of eastern Ukraine.

== History ==
=== Russian invasion of Ukraine ===
The village came under attack by Russian forces in 2022, during the Russian invasion of Ukraine, and was recaptured by Ukrainian forces by the end of September the same year.

On October 15, 2023, a church and four buildings caught fire in the village as a result of massive Russian shelling.

On November 28, 2025, Russian forces were reported to have captured the village.

On September 15, 2026, as part of Operation Vivaldi, Ukrainian forces recaptured the village.

== Local government ==
It belongs to Lyman urban hromada, one of the hromadas of Ukraine.
