= Studenok, Izium Raion =

Village in Kharkiv Oblast, Ukraine

Studenok Студенок
- Village
- Interactive map of Studenok
- Studenok in Kharkiv Oblast Studenok (Ukraine)
- Coordinates: 49.088333°N 37.485556°E
- Country: Ukraine
- Oblast: Kharkiv Oblast
- Raion: Izium Raion
- Founded: 1706

Area
  - Total: 3.374 km^{2} (1.303 sq mi)
- Elevation: 63 m (207 ft)

Population (2001 census)
  - Total: 1,435
  - Density: 425.3/km^{2} (1,102/sq mi)
- Time zone: UTC+2 (EET)
  - Summer (DST): UTC+3 (EEST)
- Postal code: 64360
- Area code: +380 5743

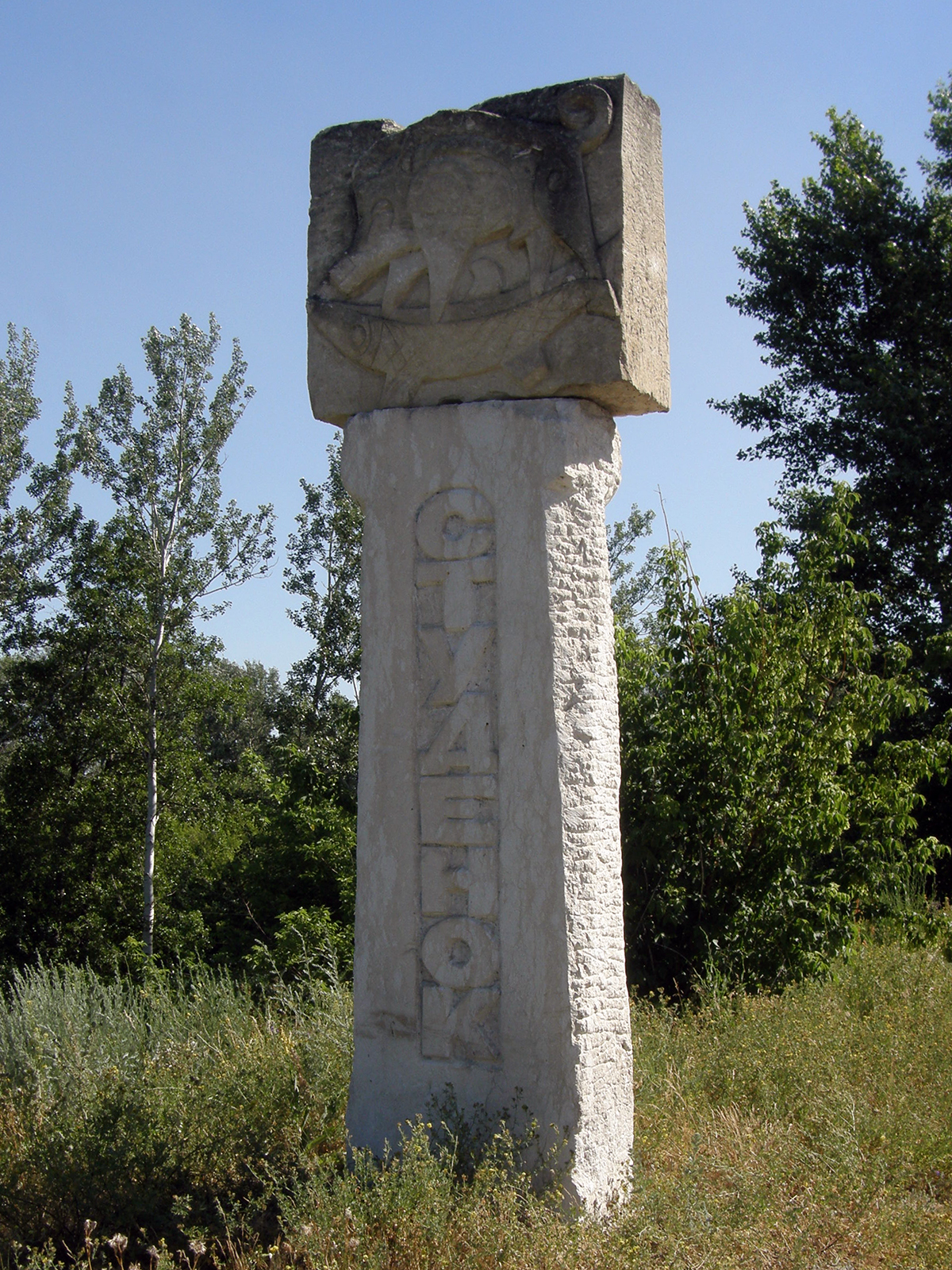
Studenok

Studenok (Ukrainian: Студенок; Russian: Студенок) is a village in Izium Raion (district) in Kharkiv Oblast of eastern Ukraine, at about 130.2 kilometres (80.9 mi) south-east from the centre of Kharkiv city, on the left bank of the Siverskyi Donets river.

The settlement came under attack by Russian forces during the Russian invasion of Ukraine in 2022, and was liberated by the Ukrainian forces in September of the same year.

== Demographics ==
The settlement had 1435 inhabitants in 2001, native language distribution as of the Ukrainian Census of 2001:

- Ukrainian: 92.99%
- Russian: 6.94%
