= Lyman, Ukraine =

City in Donetsk, Ukraine

Lyman Лиман
- City
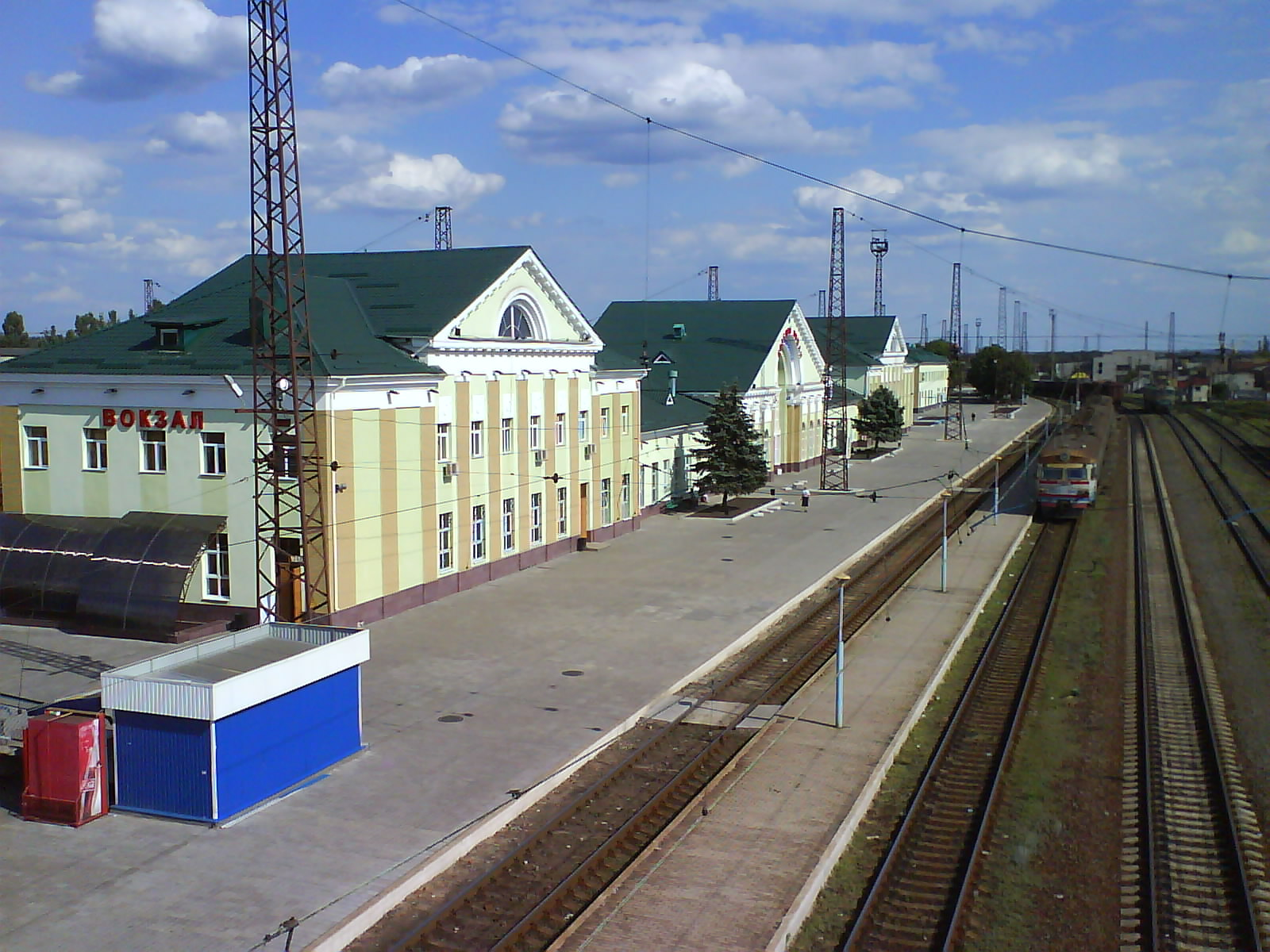
- Lyman railway station

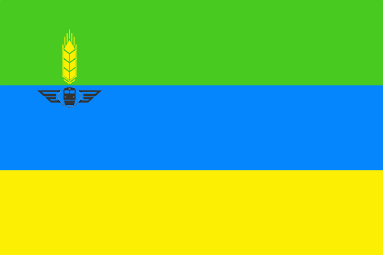
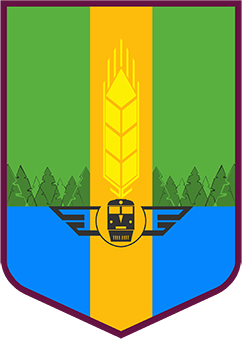
- Flag Coat of arms
- Interactive map of Lyman
- Location within Donetsk Oblast Location within Ukraine
- Coordinates: 48°59′7″N 37°48′40″E
- Country: Ukraine
- Oblast: Donetsk Oblast
- Raion: Kramatorsk Raion
- Hromada: Lyman urban hromada
- Foundation: 1667
- City rights: 1938

Government
  - Mayor: Oleksandr Zhuravlev

Area
  - Total: 26.21 km^{2} (10.12 sq mi)
- Elevation: 107 m (351 ft)

Population (2022)
  - Total: 20,066
  - Estimate (25.06.2026): ~1,600
  - Density: 765.6/km^{2} (1,983/sq mi)
- Postal code: 84400—84409
- Area code: +380-6261

Lyman (Ukrainian: Лиман, IPA: [lɪˈmɑn]; Russian: Лиман, romanized: Liman), formerly known as Krasnyi Lyman (Ukrainian: Красний Лиман; Russian: Красный Лиман, romanized: Krasnyy Liman; lit. 'Red Liman') from 1925 to 2016, is a city in Donetsk Oblast, Ukraine.

Until 2016 it also served as the administrative center of Lyman Raion, though administratively it was not part of the raion and incorporated as a city of oblast significance. It still serves as the administrative center of Lyman urban hromada and is part of Kramatorsk Raion. The population was 20,066 (2022 estimate), down from 28,172 in 2001.

The city is located in the historic region of Sloboda Ukraine. It had its origins in a military settlement established by Ukrainian Cossacks in c. 1667. It grew to become a city following the construction of a railway station, and became a key railway hub in the region.

During the Russo-Ukrainian War, the city has seen several battles. The first was the battle of Krasnyi Lyman in 2014, between Ukrainian government forces and Russian proxies loyal to the breakaway Donetsk People's Republic, which was won by Ukrainian forces. It remained under government control throughout the remainder of the war in Donbas, and was renamed to its historic name Lyman in 2016 as part of decommunization in Ukraine.

During the Russian invasion of Ukraine in 2022, Lyman has been a scene of heavy fighting. It was captured by the Russian military in May 2022, before being recaptured by Ukrainian forces in October 2022. The city has been nearly destroyed by the 2022 fighting, and most of the population has fled.

== History ==
=== Pre-founding ===
Archaeologists have discovered Neolithic stone sculptures in the Lyman district and Scythian remains from the fourth and third centuries BCE.

=== Founding and early history ===
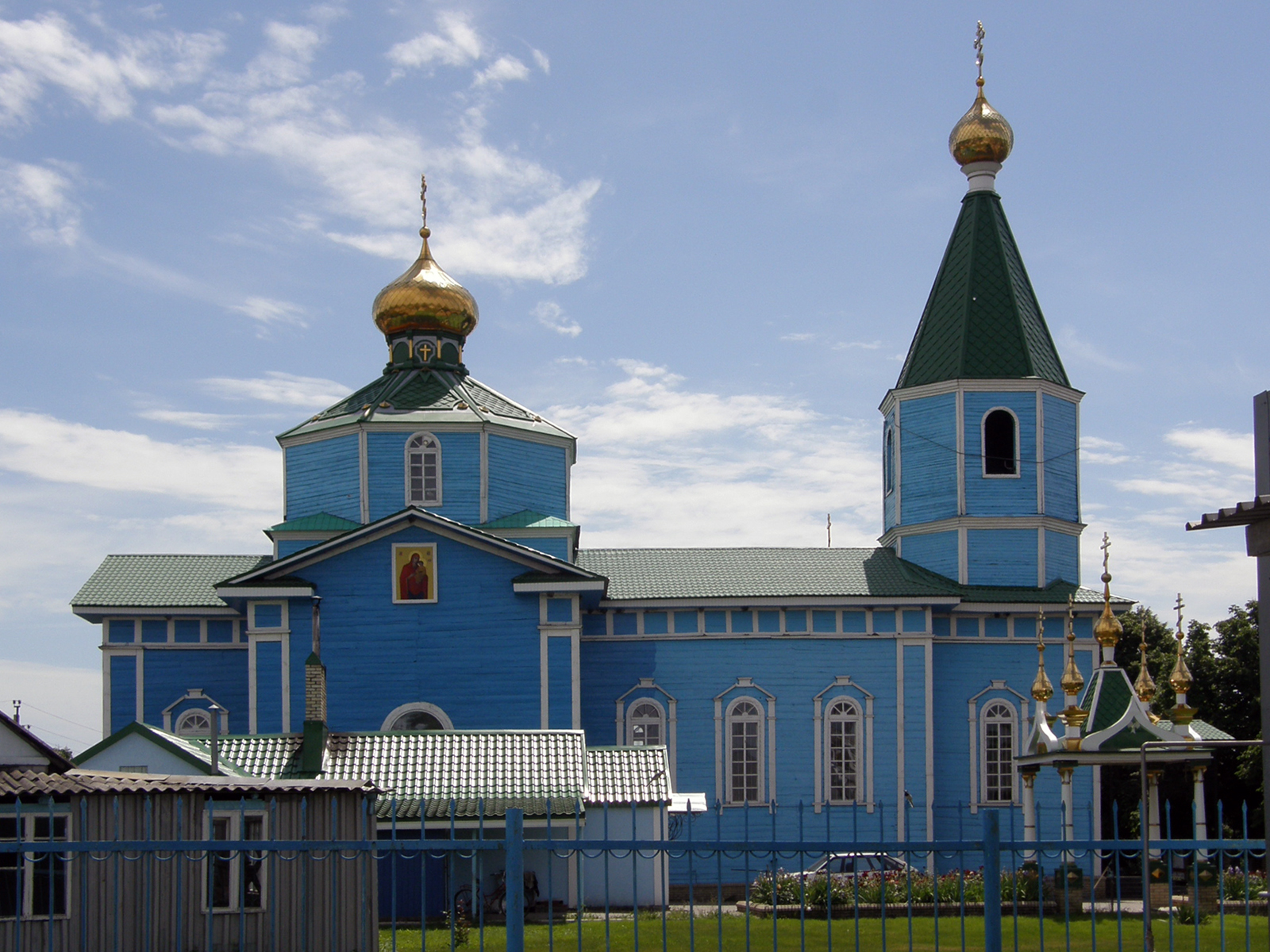
Orthodox Church of St. Peter and St. Paul, completed in 1848

In 1646, the "Mayaka" fort was built 18 kilometres (11 mi) away from the location of modern Lyman, as part of the larger effort to defend the southern border of Tsardom of Russia from the attacks of the Crimean Tatars, especially along the Donets river. Lyman itself was founded by the Izium Cossack Regiment in 1667/1678 as a fortified town near the Mayaka fortress. In the course of the administrative reform carried out in 1708 by Moscow tsar Peter I, Lyman was explicitly mentioned as one of the towns included to Azov Governorate.

=== 20th century ===
From 1904 to 1910, a railway was constructed that passed through Lyman. This railway stimulated growth of civilian settlement in the area, where earlier settlers had been entirely military.

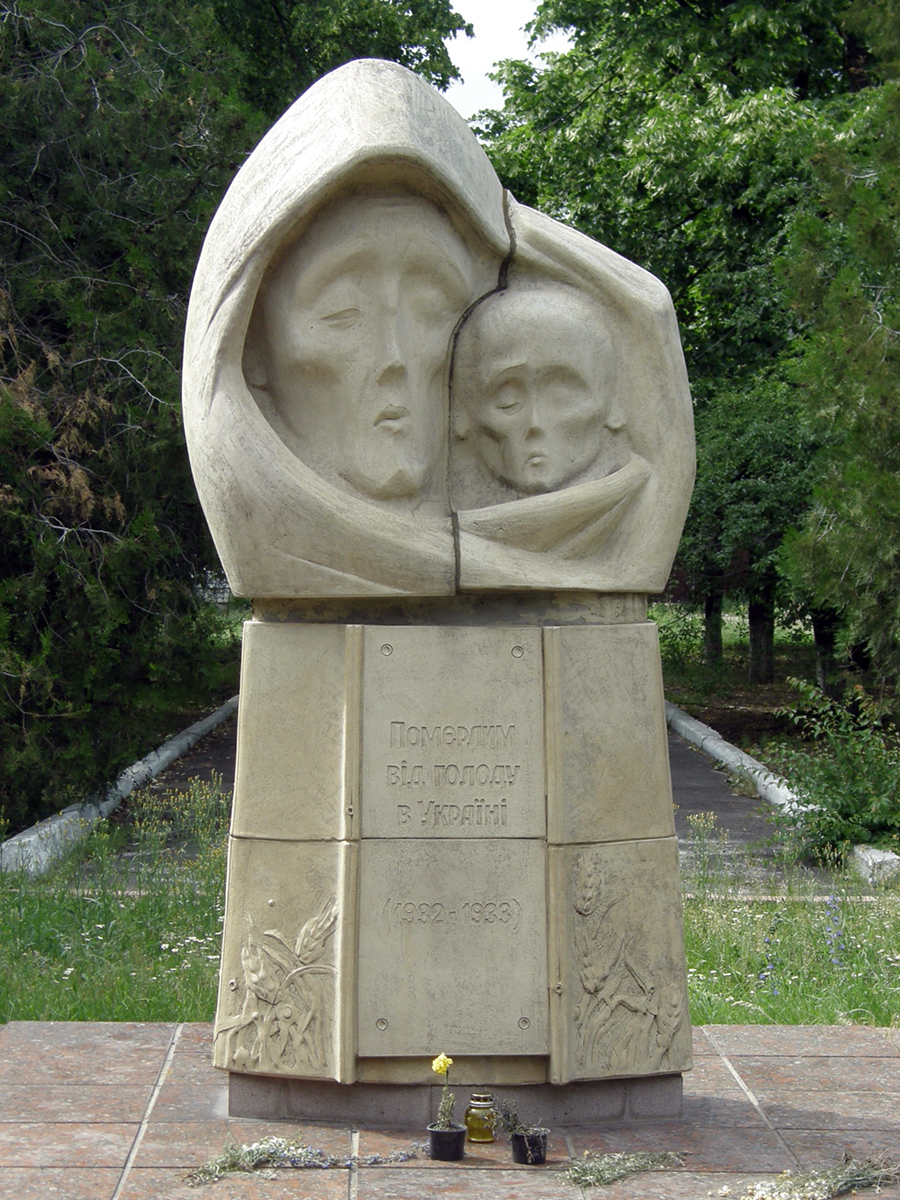
Monument to the victims of Holodomor

Lyman changed hands numerous times during World War I and the Ukrainian War of Independence. In April 1918, Lyman was taken over by the Central Powers, and passed to the Ukrainian State. In December 1918 it was captured by the Soviets, then in April 1919 it was captured by White Russian forces, and in December 1919 it was recaptured by the Soviets. Afterwards it was administratively part of the Donets Governorate of Ukraine. The town was given the prefix Krasnyi ("red") on 9 January 1925 by the Soviet government. According to the 1926 Soviet census, Krasnyi Lyman had a population of 4,800 people.

Krasnyi Lyman received city status in 1938, and its population continued to grow: by 1939, it had a population of 25,600. During World War II, Krasnyi Lyman was occupied by Nazi Germany between 7 July 1942 and 3 February 1943.

The city's population continued to grow after the end of the war. In 1988, Krasnyi Lyman became a city of regional significance.

=== Russo-Ukrainian War ===
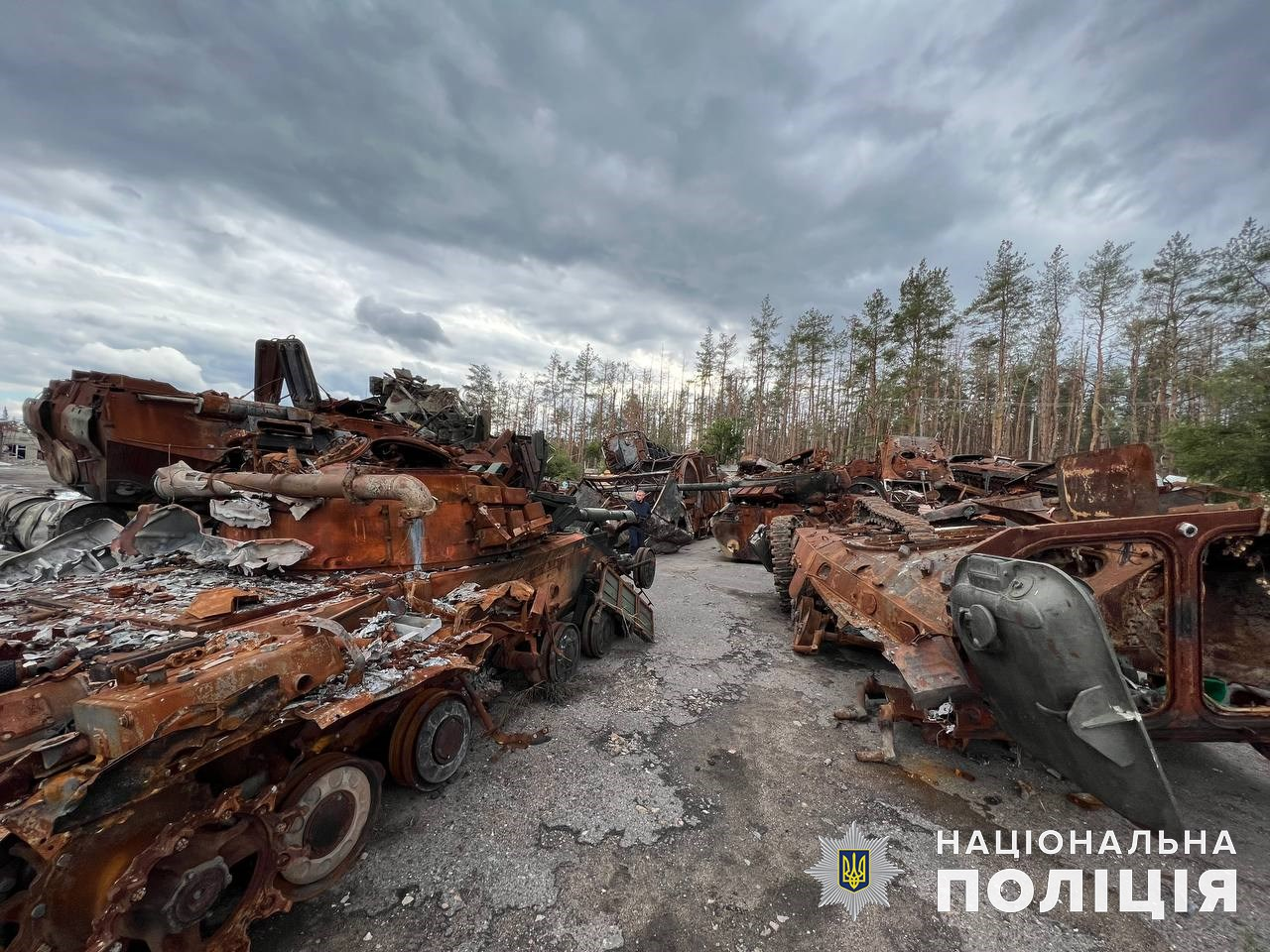
Destroyed Russian equipment after the battle of Lyman, October 2022

In June 2014, the city was the scene of the battle of Krasnyi Lyman during the war in Donbas. On 5 June the town returned to Ukrainian control. Following the 2015 law on decommunization the city returned to its original name Lyman, removing the prefix Krasnyi. The change was approved by the Verkhovna Rada (the Ukrainian parliament) on 4 February 2016.

Lyman is an important railway junction. During the Russian invasion of Ukraine, Lyman was seized by Russian troops on 27 May 2022. The Russian occupiers changed the city's name back to the Soviet name Krasnyi Liman shortly thereafter. The control of Lyman, while it is not a large city, gave Russia and its proxies control of a key road that leads to Sloviansk and Kramatorsk. From 10 September, Ukrainian troops advanced to Lyman as part of a counteroffensive launched in Kharkiv Oblast, and engaged Russian troops in a battle. On 1 October, a Russian Defense Ministry spokesman announced that Russian forces were withdrawing from the city, hours after Russian president Vladimir Putin had declared Donetsk Oblast to have been annexed by Russia.

The largely destroyed city has still been regularly shelled by Russia after the battles. On 8 July 2023, the Russian Armed Forces shelled the residential area in the center of Lyman with 9M55K-series Smerch cluster munition. Lyman was at the time approximately 15 kilometers west of Russian-occupied territories. The bombing killed 9 civilians, while 13 were wounded.

In November 2025, Russian forces entered southern part of Lyman, and the city became contested. On 21 December 2025, a Ukrainian military observer Kostyantyn Mashovets reported and confirmed that the Russian forces currently occupy positions in southeastern Lyman.

Since May 2026 there were unofficial reports about a number of minor Ukrainian counterattacks in the area. Codenamed Operation Vivaldi, the Ukrainian counterattack in the area was kept in secrecy by the Ukrainian military and there were no official reports. However by September 2026 it has become known that the Ukrainian forces made locally noticeable advances, increasing their contol by 150-250 square kilometers (95-135 square miles) and pushed the Russian forces beyond the Zherebets river, with it also being the first recorded operation involving the airdropping of Unmanned ground vehicles behind enemy lines. Russian bloggers criticized Russian military for false reports they dubbed "pretty reports" ("красивые доклады"). In particular, it appears that Putin's September 1 announcement about Russian control of Sviatohirsk, a city in the area, was unsupported.

== Economy ==
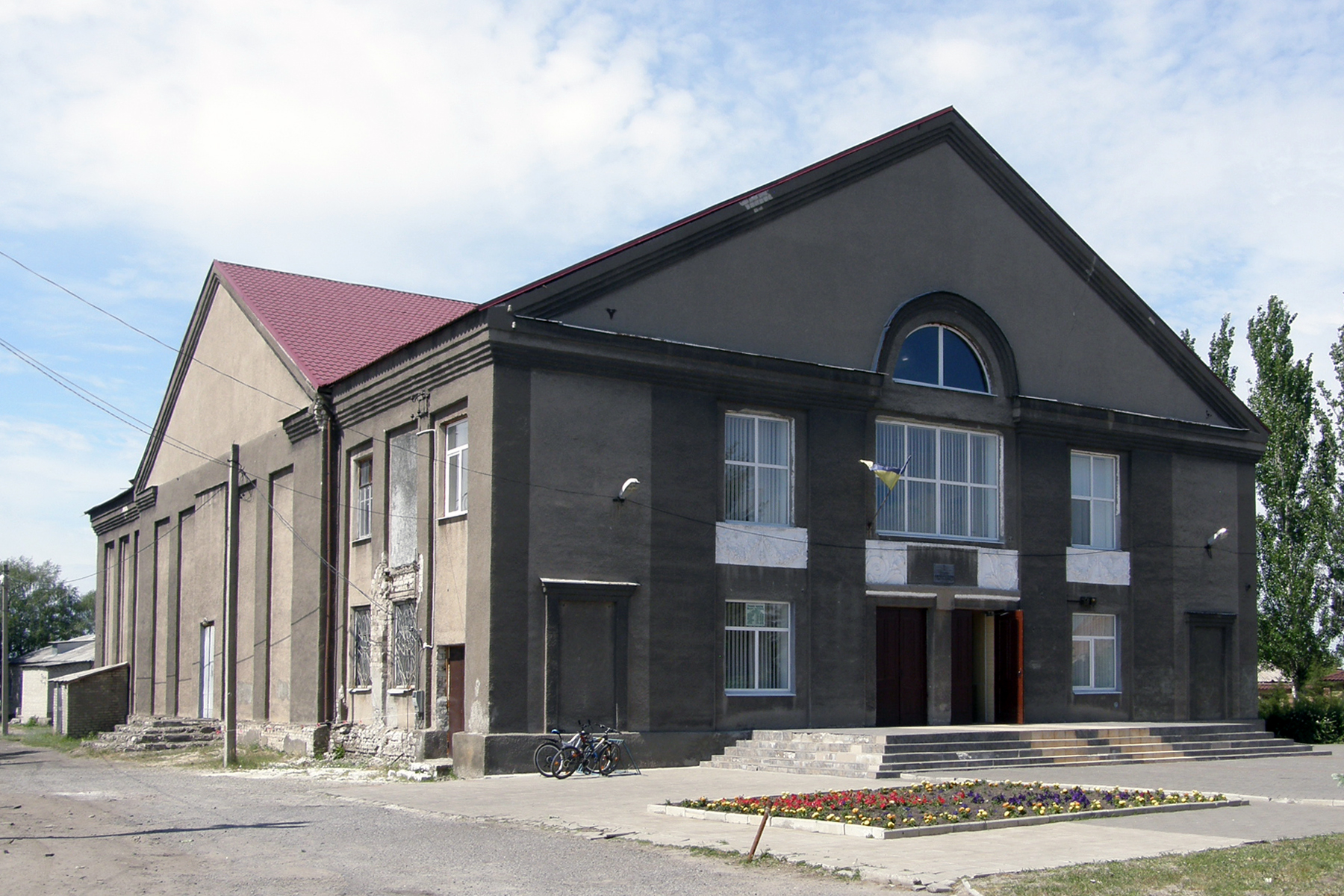
Centre of Culture and Leisure

The city is known by locals as "The Gates of Donbas", and is a regional export hub for goods like coal, salt, and sand.

Lyman is a key railway hub, carrying up to 30% of cargo on the Donetsk railway system. 35% of residents are employed in rail transport, and 18% in industry. Railway transport enterprises include the local office of the Donetsk Railway Administration, the PMS-10 track engine station, the ТЧ-1 locomotive depot, the РПЧ-3 motor car depot, and numerous maintenance sites and sections of the railway. Other industries include food processing, a feed mill, quarry management, the Leman-Beton concrete manufacturer, and others.

More than 80 agricultural enterprises operate in the region. The forestry and animal husbandry business is among the most important in Ukraine. More than 40,000 mink skins are produced in Lyman annually. There is also a branch of the energy company 000 Donbasnefteprodukt. Other industries have included a silicate brick factory, an asphalt and concrete factory, and a food canning factory.

== Social sphere ==
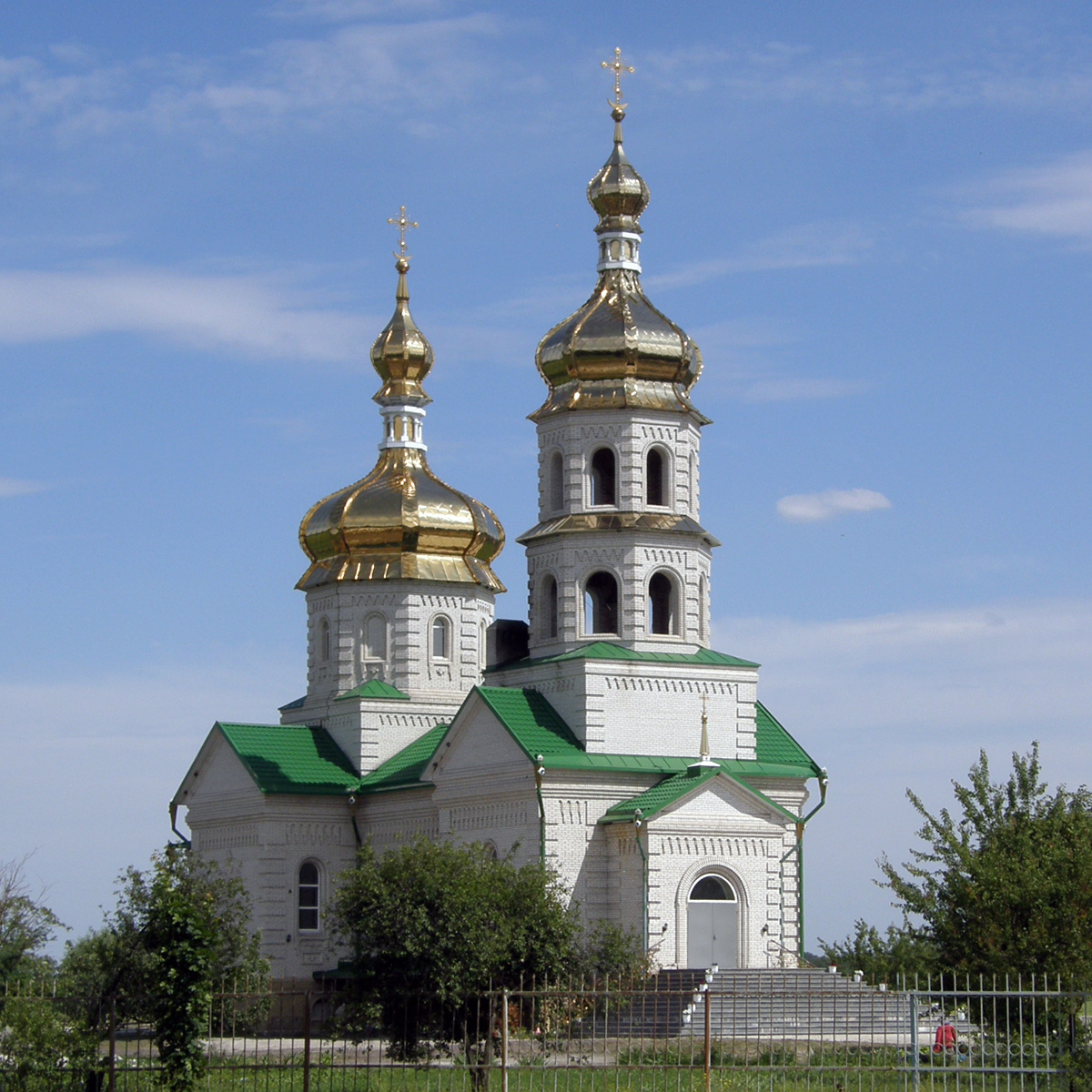
Church of Saint Lawrence

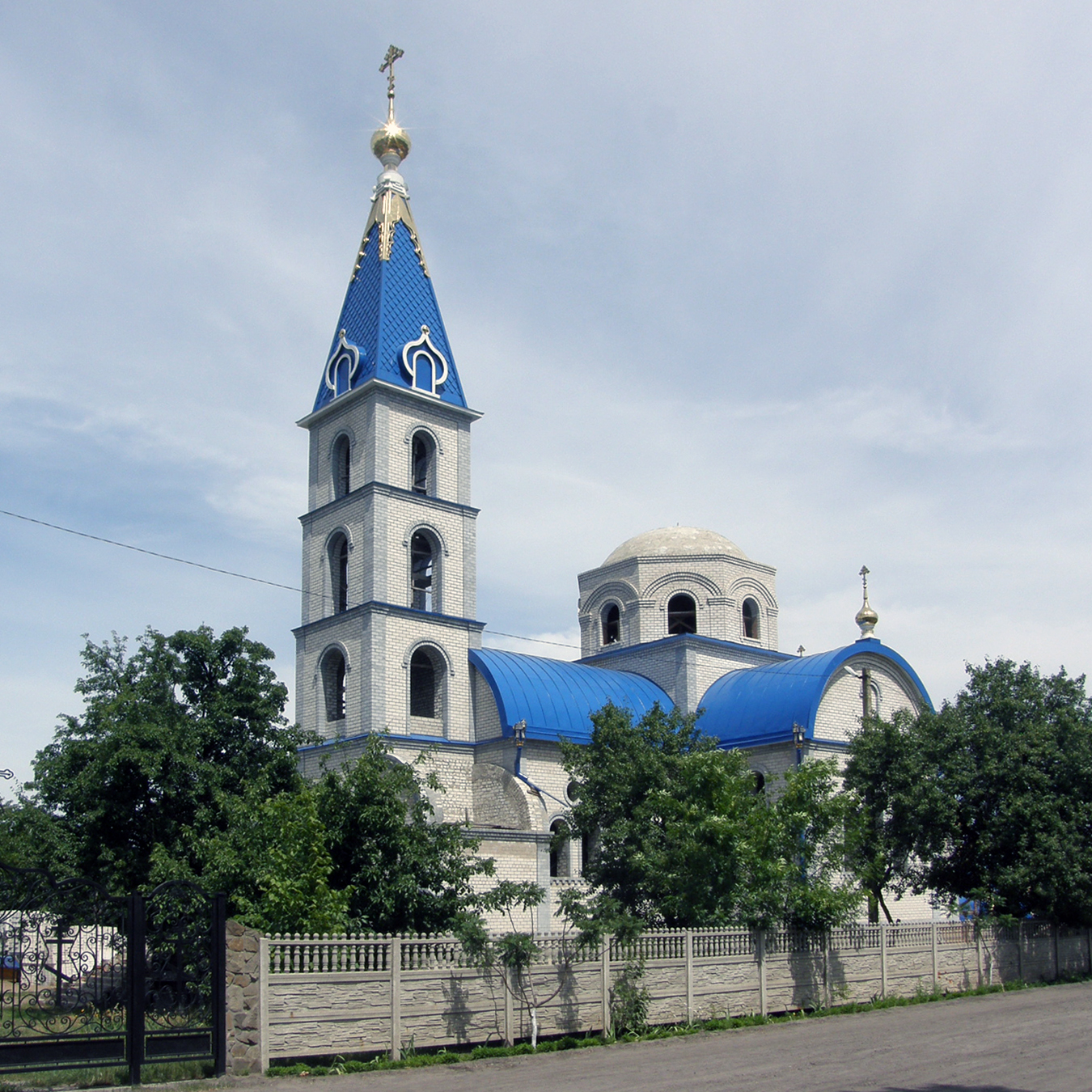
Church of the Iberian Icon of the Mother of God

There are located many types of schools. Technical School of Machinists, Medical School, Vocational School. 3 hospitals (865 beds, 100 doctors), 3 cultural centers, 29 libraries, 10 schools (including a lyceum and a gymnasium; 4,500 students and 250 teachers), a music school, a children's and youth sports school, a branch of the Ukrainian State University of Railway Transport.

== Demographics ==
Population history

| Year | Pop. | ±% p.a. |
|---|---|---|
| 1926 | 4,800 | — |
| 1939 | 25,600 | +13.74% |
| 1959 | 28,900 | +0.61% |
| 1979 | 31,800 | +0.48% |

| Year | Pop. | ±% p.a. |
|---|---|---|
| 1998 | 29,300 | −0.43% |
| 2001 | 28,172 | −1.30% |
| 2022 | 20,066 | −1.60% |
| 2025 | 3,634 | −43.42% |

As of the 2001 Ukrainian census, 28,172 people lived in the city. Of these, 84.4% were Ukrainians, 13.8% were Russians, and 0.6% were Belarusians. In terms of native language, 69.8% spoke Ukrainian, 29.67% spoke Russian, and 0.53% spoke other languages or did not answer the survey question. The exact ethnic and linguistic composition was as follows:

Ethnic groups in Lyman
| | percent |
| Ukrainians | 84.35% |
| Russians | 13.77% |
| Belarusians | 0.58% |
| Azerbaijanis | 0.11% |
| Armenians | 0.09% |
| Tatars | 0.09% |
| Georgians | 0.08% |
| Moldovans | 0.05% |

Native languages in Lyman
| | percent |
| Ukrainian | 69.80% |
| Russian | 29.67% |
| Belarusian | 0.2% |
| Romani | 0.1% |
| others | 0.1% |

The population has declined in the early 21st century, decreasing to an estimated 20,066 by 2022. After the intense fighting during the Russian invasion of Ukraine, most residents have fled or have been killed, with Lyman mayor Oleksandr Zhuravlev estimating only 6,000 remaining in 2023, including 500 children.

== Monuments ==
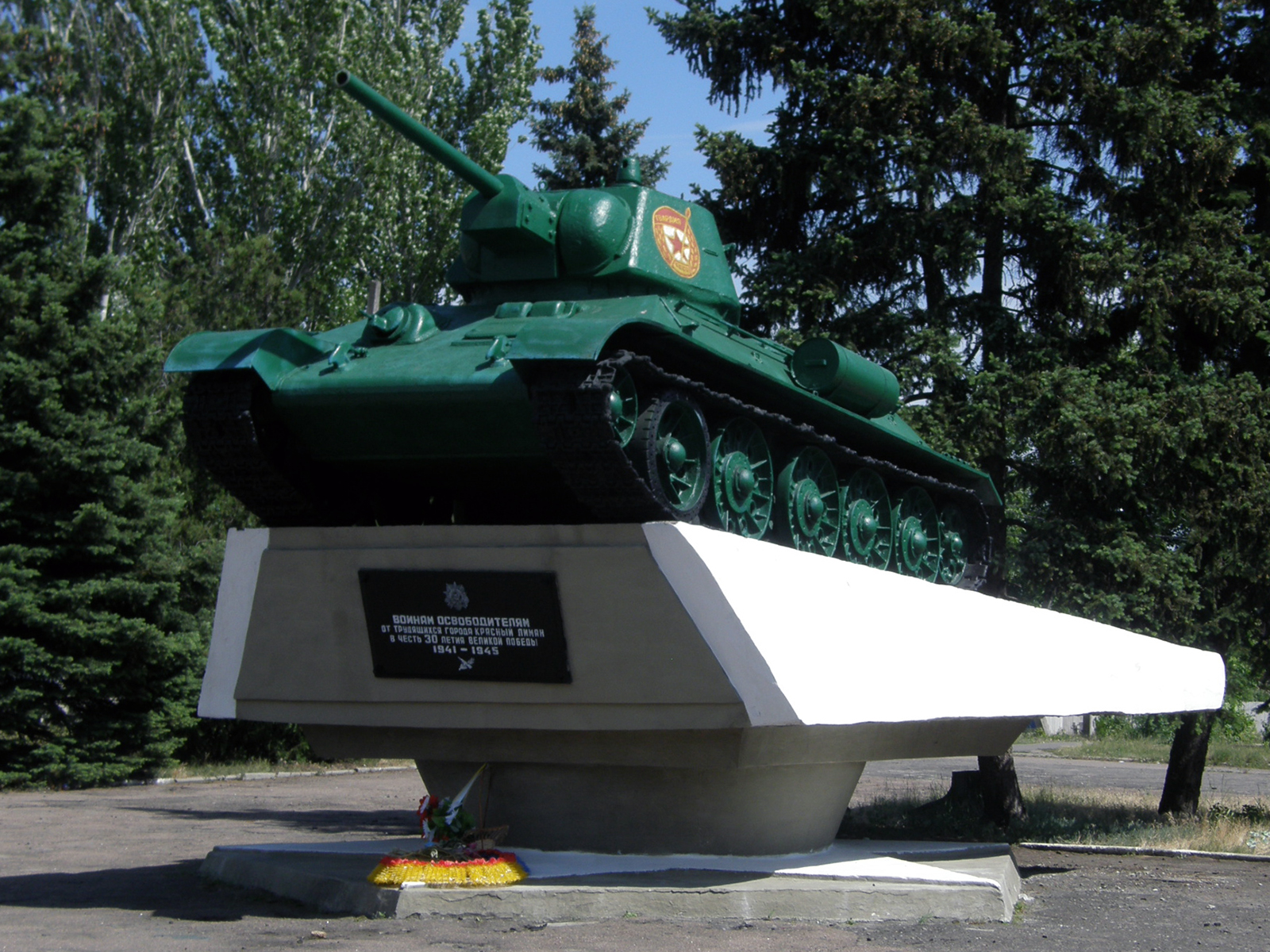
Monument to the liberators of Krasny Liman.

- Monument to fallen Afghan soldiers (monument to internationalist soldiers)
- Monument (memorial) to the Holodomor victims of 1932–1933
- Lifetime bust of two-time Hero of the Soviet Union cosmonaut Leonid Denisovich Kizim
- Monument to the liberators of Krasny Liman (a T-34 tank on a pedestal)
- Motherland Memorial with an Eternal Flame
- Monuments to participants in the Revolution, the Civil War, and the Great Patriotic War

== Twin towns ==
On 11 January 2023, Westport, Connecticut officially announced Lyman as their sister city.
