= Kramatorsk Raion =

Subdivision of Donetsk Oblast, Ukraine

Coordinates: 48°50′N 37°25′E

Kramatorsk Raion Краматорський район
- Raion
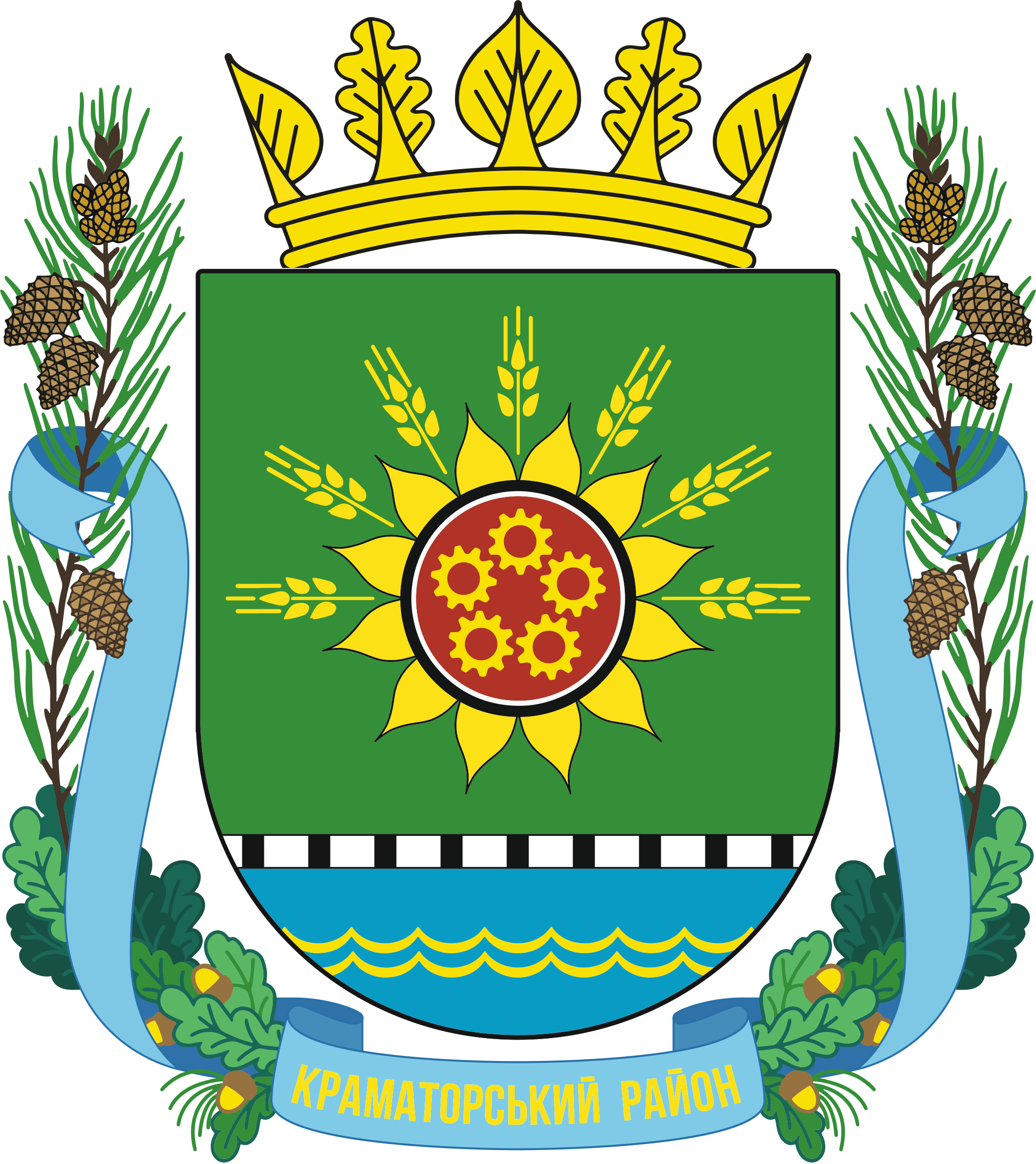
- Flag Coat of arms
- Interactive map of Kramatorsk Raion
- Country: Ukraine
- Oblast: Donetsk
- Established: 2020
- Admin. center: Kramatorsk
- Subdivisions: 12 hromadas

Area
  - Total: 5,186.3 km^{2} (2,002.4 sq mi)

Population (2022)
  - Total: 543,371
  - Density: 104.77/km^{2} (271.35/sq mi)

Kramatorsk Raion (Ukrainian: Краматорський район, romanized: Kramatorskyi raion; Russian: Краматорский район, romanized: Kramatorsky rayon) is a raion (district) of Donetsk Oblast, Ukraine. It was created in July 2020 as part of the reform of administrative divisions of Ukraine. The center of the raion is the city of Kramatorsk. Population: 543,371 (2022 estimate).

The 2020 administrative reform increased the raion in size merging with Oleksandrivka Raion, Lyman Raion, Kostiantynivka Raion, and Sloviansk Raion. All cities of regional significance within those raions were brought under the raion administration, including Kramatorsk, Sloviansk, Kostiantynivka, Druzhkivka, and Lyman.

== Subdivisions ==
The raion consists of 12 hromadas:

- Andriivka rural hromada
- Cherkaske settlement hromada
- Druzhkivka urban hromada
- Illinivka rural hromada
- Kostiantynivka urban hromada
- Kramatorsk urban hromada
- Lyman urban hromada
- Mykolaivka urban hromada
- Novodonetske settlement hromada
- Oleksandrivka settlement hromada
- Sviatohirsk urban hromada
- Sloviansk urban hromada
