= List of honorary citizens of Ternopil =

List of honorary citizens of the city of Ternopil.

Honorary citizens:

1. Agenor Holuchowski, count, governor of Galicia (1867)

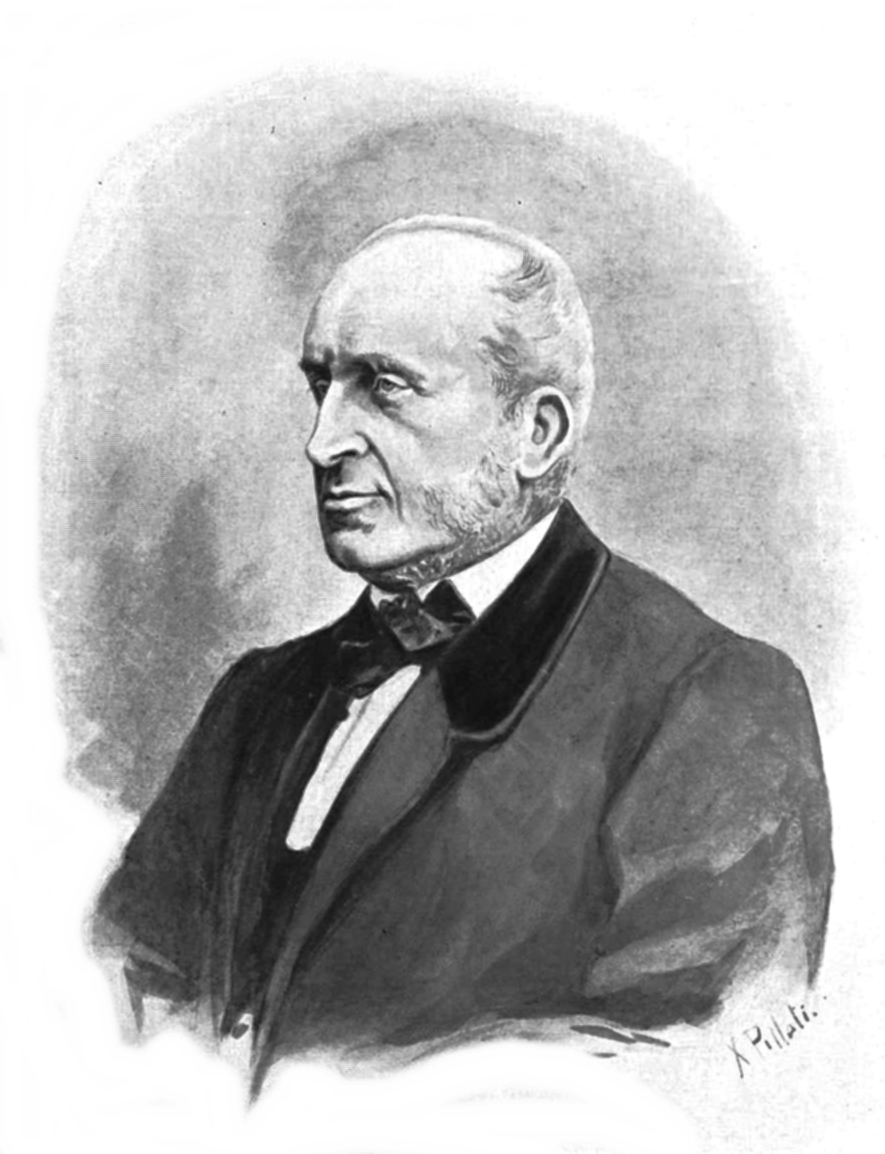
Agenor Holuchowski

1. Yevsevii Cherkavskyi, doctor, ambassador to the Austrian Parliament (1875)
2. Adam Sapiha, Prince (1894)
3. Leon Piniński, count, governor of Galicia (1903)
4. Ludwik Puntschert, burgomaster of Ternopil (1905)
5. Włodzimierz Lenkiewicz, government commissioner of Ternopil (1926)
6. Edward Rydz-Śmigły, Marshal of Poland (1939)
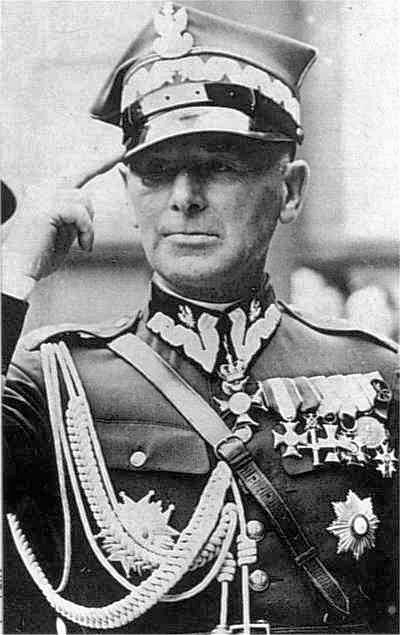
  Edward Rydz-Śmigły
7. Hryhorii Shevchuk, Deputy Chairman of the Council of Ministers of the Ukrainian SSR, former First Secretary of the Ternopil Regional Committee of the Communist Party of Ukraine (1968)
8. Heorhii Yordanov, First Secretary of the Sliven District Committee of the Communist Party of Bulgaria (1968)
9. Heorhii Andonov, Deputy Chairman of the executive committee of the Sliven District People's Council of Bulgaria (1968)
10. Liuben Rankov, First Secretary of the Sliven City Committee of the Communist Party of Bulgaria (1968)
11. Hospodin Yorohv, head of the cooperative farm in the village of Zahorna, Sliven District, Bulgaria (1968)
12. Slavka Nikolova, chairman of the community committee of the Fatherland Front in the village of Grodets, Sliven District, Bulgaria (1968)
13. Bronislav Dombrovskyi, a worker at the Ternopilgaz production association (1968)
14. Kostiantyn Matvieiev, war veteran, personal pensioner (1968)
15. Ivan Liudnikov, Hero of the Soviet Union, retired Colonel General, former commander of the 81st Rifle Corps (1969)
16. Mykola Kucherenko, Hero of the Soviet Union, Colonel (posthumously), former commander of the 302nd Ternopil Rifle Division (1969)
17. Hryhorii Tantsorov, Hero of the Soviet Union, Guards Junior Lieutenant (posthumously), former commander of the SAU-8 battery (1969)
18. Anatolii Zhyvov, Hero of the Soviet Union, Guard Private (posthumously), telegraph operator of the communication platoon of the 302nd Infantry Division (1969)
19. Hryhorii Khilko, reserve colonel, war veteran (1969)
20. Heorhii Danchev, citizen of Bulgaria (1969)
21. Heorhii Mykhailov, Bulgarian citizen (1969)
22. Petro Chazov, a war veteran (1969)
23. Slava Nediev, Bulgarian citizen (1970)
24. Pavlo Serhel, personal pensioner (1971)
25. Stepan Tkach, former secretary of the executive committee of the Ternopil Regional Council of Workers' Deputies, personal pensioner (1972)
26. Ivan Orap, war veteran, personal pensioner (1973)
27. Ivan Synitsyn, former Deputy Chairman of the executive committee of the Ternopil City Council of Workers' Deputies, personal pensioner (1973)
28. Zakhar Dorofeiev, former first deputy chairman of the executive committee of the Ternopil Regional Council of Workers' Deputies, personal pensioner (1973)
29. Stepan Sachko, war veteran, personal pensioner (1974)
30. Mykola Monetov, reserve colonel, war veteran (1983)
31. Volodymyr Mylnikov, Hero of the Soviet Union, lecturer at the Ternopil branch of the Lviv Polytechnic Institute (1983)
32. Klavdiia Shalikova, former radio operator of the 302nd Infantry Division battery (1984)
33. Volodymyr Ihnatiev, a war veteran (1984)
34. Denys Derhachov, a retired colonel and war veteran (1985)
35. Andrii Sniezhko, war veteran, Captain of the Guard (1985)
36. Semen Khomskyi, from the Ternopil Experimental Repair and Mechanical Plant (1985)
37. Ivan Duz, war veteran (1985)
38. Olha Kudinova, personal pensioner of the Union (1985)
39. Ivan Komarov, chairman of the Ternopil City Council of War and Labor Veterans (1989)
40. Myroslav Ivan Lubachivskyi, Major Archbishop of the UGCC (1991)
41. Mstyslav (Skrypnyk), prominent Ukrainian church leader, Patriarch of Kyiv and All Ukraine (1991)
42. Stepan Khmara, Member of Parliament of Ukraine (1991)
43. Viacheslav Oliinyk, the first Olympic champion of the Ukraine national team, Greco-Roman wrestler (1996)
44. Viktor Yushchenko, former President of Ukraine, chairman of the Board of the National Bank of Ukraine (1997)
45. Oleksandr Ustenko, academician, rector of the Ternopil Academy of National Economy (2001)
46. Oleksii Shymkiv, pensioner (2001)
47. Roman Yaremchuk, President and chairman of the Board of Vatra OJSC, deputy of the regional council (2002)
48. Liubomyr (Huzar), Major Archbishop of the Ukrainian Greek Catholic Church (2002)
49. Ihor Gereta, archaeologist, art historian, historian, poet (posthumously) (2003)
50. Volodymyr Bihuniak, Vice-Rector of the Ternopil State Academy named after I. Y. Gorbachevsky (2003)
51. Oleh Shablii, Rector of Ternopil State Technical University named after I. Puluy (2003)
52. Petro Kuzma-Balytskyi, Ukrainian public and political figure, philanthropist, OUN activist, headed the Ukrainian community in Denmark and the Anti-Bolshevik Bloc of Peoples in Scandinavia for 40 years (2008)
53. Levko Lukianenko, Chairman of the Council of Elders of the Ukrainian Republican Party "Sobor", Member of Parliament of Ukraine (2008)
54. Ivan Marchuk, artist, one of the 100 geniuses of the world (2008)
55. Stepan Bandera, leader of the OUN (2010, posthumously)
56. Roman Shukhevych, Commander-in-Chief of the UPA (2010, posthumously)
57. Roman Piatnytskyi, former commander of the corvette Ternopil (2010)
58. Stepan Sapeliak, active participant of the national liberation movement, poet (2011)
59. Yosyf Slipyi, head of the Ukrainian Greek Catholic Church (2011, posthumously)
60. Leonid Kudrynskyi, veteran of the fire department of Ternopil Oblast, liquidator of the consequences of the Chornobyl accident (posthumously) (2011)
61. Les Kurbas, actor and theater director (2012, posthumously)
62. Yevhen Konovalets, colonel of the UPR Army, commander of the Ukrainian Insurgent Army, head of the Leadership of Ukrainian Nationalists (2013, posthumously)
63. Solomiia Krushelnytska, Ukrainian opera singer (2013, posthumously)
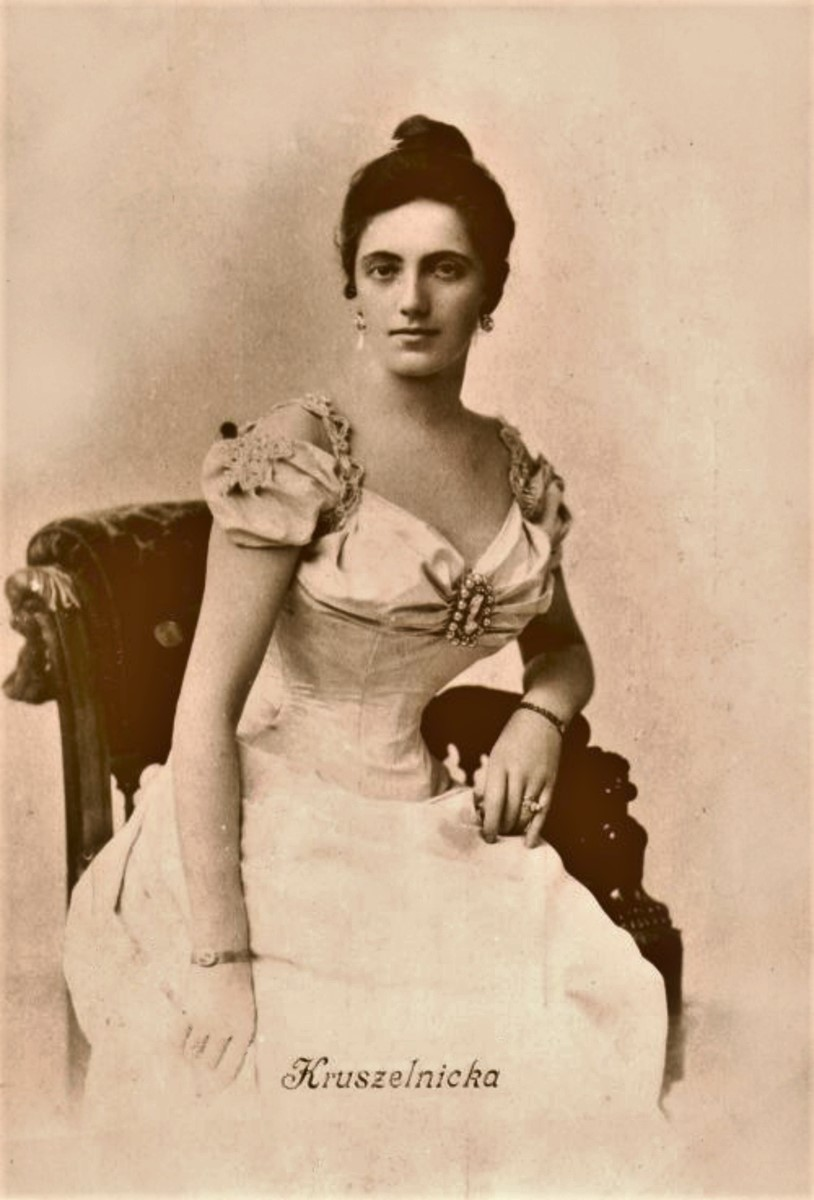
  Solomiia Krushelnytska
64. Danylo Chepil, Ukrainian architect (2013)
65. Pavlo Bas, Ukrainian soldier, ATO participant (2015, posthumously)
66. Viktor Hurniak, Ukrainian soldier, ATO participant (2015, posthumously)
67. Andrii Dremin, Ukrainian serviceman, ATO participant (2015, posthumously)
68. Dmytro Zaplitnyi, Ukrainian serviceman, ATO participant (2015, posthumously)
69. Fedir Kolomiets, Ukrainian serviceman, participant of the ATO (2015, posthumously)
70. Vitalii Kurylovych, Ukrainian serviceman, ATO participant (2015, posthumously)
71. Vitalii Lototskii, Ukrainian serviceman, ATO participant (2015, posthumously)
72. Yurii Nalyvaichuk, Ukrainian serviceman, ATO participant (2015, posthumously)
73. Oleksandr Orliak, Ukrainian serviceman, ATO participant (2015, posthumously)
74. Pavlo Rymar, Ukrainian serviceman, ATO participant (2015, posthumously)
75. Nazarii Syklitskyi, Ukrainian serviceman, participant of the ATO (2015, posthumously)
76. Viktor Stefanovych, Ukrainian serviceman, ATO participant (2015, posthumously)
77. Zinovii Flekeyi, Ukrainian serviceman, ATO participant (2015, posthumously)
78. Andrii Yurkevych, Ukrainian serviceman, ATO participant (2015, posthumously)
79. Serhii Kulchytskyi, Ukrainian serviceman, Major General, ATO participant (2016, posthumously)
80. Volodymyr Vovk, Ukrainian serviceman, ATO participant (2016, posthumously)
81. Yurii Horayskyi, Ukrainian serviceman, ATO participant (2016, posthumously)
82. Mykhailo Dumanskyi, Ukrainian serviceman, ATO participant (2016, posthumously)
83. Andrii Pytak, Ukrainian soldier, ATO participant (2016, posthumously)
84. Mykhailo Stasiv, Ukrainian serviceman, ATO participant (2016, posthumously)
85. Volodymyr Yanytskyi, Ukrainian serviceman, ATO participant (2016, posthumously)
86. Gocha Arobelidze, Georgian public figure from Batumi. Batumi (2016)
87. Volodymyr Kravets, Rector of Ternopil Volodymyr Hnatiuk National Pedagogical University (2016)
88. Volodymyr Kolinets, Ukrainian public and political figure, publicist, literary critic, teacher (2017)
89. Andrii Pidluzhnyi, Ukrainian singer, composer, musician, TV presenter, producer (2017)
90. Bohdan Melnychuk, Ukrainian writer, playwright, editor, journalist, local historian (2017)
91. Myroslav Mysla, Ukrainian serviceman, junior lieutenant, platoon commander of the separate consolidated assault company "Carpathian Sich" of the 93rd Brigade (2017, posthumously)
92. Mefodii (Kudriakov), Ukrainian public and political church leader, the third head of the Ukrainian Autocephalous Orthodox Church in 2000–2015, Metropolitan of Kyiv and All Ukraine (2017, posthumously)
93. Volodymyr Staiura, Ukrainian engineer, entrepreneur, philanthropist, politician, military officer (2017, posthumously)
94. Volodymyr Lishchuk, Ukrainian public figure (2018)
95. Ruslan Muliar, Ukrainian ATO participant, colonel of the Security Service of Ukraine (2018, posthumously)
96. Andrii Stoiko, Ukrainian soldier, participant in the events of the Revolution of Dignity (2018, posthumously)
97. Oleksandr Khara, Ukrainian combatant in the DRA, colonel of the medical service (2018, posthumously)
98. Yaroslav Hapiuk, Ukrainian scientist, activist, deputy of the city council of the first democratic convocation (2018, posthumously)
99. Hryhorii Drapak, Ukrainian actor of the spoken word genre (2019)
100. Serhii Siryi, Ukrainian songwriter (2019, posthumously)
101. Dariia Chubata, Ukrainian public figure (2019)
102. Mykhailo Andreichyn, Head of the Department of Infectious Diseases with Epidemiology, Skin and Venereal Diseases at the Gorbachevsky Ternopil National Medical University (2020)
103. Oleksandr Venhrynovych, Chairman of the All-Ukrainian Society "Lemkivshchyna" (2020)
104. Oleh Herman, public and cultural figure, poet, graphic artist (2020)
105. Anton Hrytsyshyn, head of the regional organization "Memorial" named after V. Stus (2020)
106. Ivan Dediukh, sergeant of the 24th separate assault battalion "Aidar" of the Armed Forces of Ukraine, participant of the Russian-Ukrainian war (2020, posthumously)
107. Yulian Kreitor, founder and first director of the Ternopil Academic Regional Theater of Actors and Puppets (2020)
108. Lesia Liubarska, poet, public figure (2020)
109. Volodymyr Plaskonis, Master of Sports in Classical Wrestling, Honored Coach in Classical Wrestling, former director of the Ternopil Children and Youth Sports School of the Olympic Reserve in Greco-Roman Wrestling (2020)
110. Mykhailo Tsymbalistyi, Major of the Armed Forces of Ukraine, participant in the Russian-Ukrainian war (2020, posthumously)
111. Volodymyr Shkrobot, Director General of the Ternopil Regional Psychoneurological Hospital (2020)
112. Yevhen Udin, public figure, Honored Artist of Ukraine (2021)
113. Yaroslav Lemishka, Director of the Ternopil Regional Philharmonic (2021)
114. Viktor Shemchuk, President of the National Federation of Water and Motor Sports of Ukraine (2021)
115. Mykhailo Dianov, soldier, participant in the heroic defense of Mariupol, defender of Azovstal (2022)
116. Kateryna Polishchuk, paramedic of the Hospitallers medical battalion, participant in the heroic defense of Mariupol, defender of Azovstal (2022)
117. Oleksandr Pytel, Ukrainian serviceman, soldier, participant in the Russian-Ukrainian war (2022, posthumously)
118. Petro Batkivskyi, Ukrainian serviceman, lieutenant, commander of a motorized infantry platoon, participant in the Russian-Ukrainian war (2022, posthumously)
119. Roman Stetsiuk, Ukrainian serviceman, senior soldier, flamethrower operator of a special forces group, participant in the Russian-Ukrainian war (2022, posthumously)
120. Andrii Terebii was a Ukrainian serviceman, soldier, senior rifleman of the 3rd Airmobile Company, a participant in the Russian-Ukrainian war (2022, posthumously)
121. Volodymyr Broda was a Ukrainian serviceman, junior sergeant, commander of the communications unit, a participant in the Russian-Ukrainian war (2022, posthumously)
122. Mykola Kuryk, Ukrainian serviceman, soldier, participant of the Russian-Ukrainian war (2022, posthumously)
123. Volodymyr Babiak, a Ukrainian serviceman, junior sergeant, of the second airborne assault company, a participant in the Russian-Ukrainian war (2022, posthumously)
124. Vasyl Paslavskyi, Ukrainian serviceman, soldier, participant of the Russian-Ukrainian war (2022, posthumously)
125. Viacheslav Kravchuk, Ukrainian serviceman, colonel, commander of a Special Forces company, participant of the Russian-Ukrainian war (2022, posthumously)
126. Yaroslav Kondratiuk, Ukrainian serviceman, sergeant, participant of the Russian-Ukrainian war (2022, posthumously)
127. Vitalii Derekh, Ukrainian serviceman, junior sergeant, participant of the Russian-Ukrainian war (2022, posthumously)
128. Andrii Fedorkiv, Ukrainian serviceman, soldier, participant of the Russian-Ukrainian war (2022, posthumously)
129. Ihor Melnyk, Ukrainian serviceman, senior intelligence officer, participant of the Russian-Ukrainian war (2022, posthumously)
130. Serhii Shyshkovskyi, Ukrainian serviceman, senior combat medic, participant of the Russian-Ukrainian war (2022, posthumously)
131. Ihor Hesiuk, Ukrainian serviceman, soldier, participant of the Russian-Ukrainian war (2022, posthumously)
132. Andrii Poberezhnyk, Ukrainian serviceman, soldier, participant of the Russian-Ukrainian war (2022, posthumously)
133. Mykola Diachenko, Ukrainian serviceman, sergeant, participant of the Russian-Ukrainian war (2022, posthumously)
134. Ivan Ozirenskyi, Ukrainian serviceman, soldier, participant of the Russian-Ukrainian war (2022, posthumously)
135. Mykola Holubovych, Ukrainian serviceman, soldier, participant of the Russian-Ukrainian war (2022, posthumously)
136. Oleksii Yermakov, Ukrainian serviceman, soldier, participant of the Russian-Ukrainian war (2022, posthumously)
137. Yaroslav Mudryi, Ukrainian serviceman, soldier, participant of the Russian-Ukrainian war (2022, posthumously)
138. Viktor Horeida, Ukrainian serviceman, soldier, participant of the Russian-Ukrainian war (2022, posthumously)
139. Ivan Dudar, Ukrainian serviceman, soldier, participant of the Russian-Ukrainian war (2022, posthumously)
140. Oleh Khrushch, Ukrainian serviceman, soldier, participant of the Russian-Ukrainian war (2022, posthumously)
141. Oleksandr Osadko, Ukrainian serviceman, soldier, participant of the Russian-Ukrainian war (2022, posthumously)
142. Ivan Zablotskyi, Ukrainian serviceman, soldier, participant of the Russian-Ukrainian war (2022, posthumously)
143. Ihor Khudyi, Ukrainian serviceman, soldier, participant of the Russian-Ukrainian war (2022, posthumously)
144. Volodymyr Zablotskyi, Ukrainian serviceman, soldier, participant of the Russian-Ukrainian war (2022, posthumously)
145. Volodymyr Fomenko, Ukrainian serviceman, soldier, participant of the Russian-Ukrainian war (2022, posthumously)
146. Mykhailo Pavlyk, Ukrainian serviceman, soldier, participant of the Russian-Ukrainian war (2022, posthumously)
147. Yevhen Shchennikov, Ukrainian serviceman, soldier, participant of the Russian-Ukrainian war (2022, posthumously)
148. Ihor Pysarevych, Ukrainian serviceman, soldier, participant of the Russian-Ukrainian war (2022, posthumously)
149. Yaroslav Fedkiv, Ukrainian serviceman, soldier, participant of the Russian-Ukrainian war (2022, posthumously)
150. Volodymyr Tesliuk, Ukrainian serviceman, soldier, participant of the Russian-Ukrainian war (2022, posthumously)
151. Volodymyr Torohoi, Ukrainian serviceman, lieutenant, participant of the Russian-Ukrainian war (2022, posthumously)
152. Artem Uzunalov, Ukrainian serviceman, sergeant, participant of the Russian-Ukrainian war (2022, posthumously)
153. Nazar Lvivskyi, Ukrainian serviceman, soldier, participant of the Russian-Ukrainian war (2022, posthumously)
154. Volodymyr Blazhkiv, Ukrainian serviceman, senior soldier, participant of the Russian-Ukrainian war (2022, posthumously).
155. Vladyslav Ratnychenko, Ukrainian serviceman, soldier, participant of the Russian-Ukrainian war (2022, posthumously)
156. Ihor Rozhuk, Ukrainian serviceman, soldier, participant of the Russian-Ukrainian war (2022, posthumously)
157. Serhii Rudyi, Ukrainian serviceman, police captain, participant of the Russian-Ukrainian war (2022, posthumously)
158. Volodymyr Savchuk, Ukrainian serviceman, soldier, participant of the Russian-Ukrainian war (2022, posthumously)
159. Viktor Yatsunyk, Ukrainian serviceman, soldier, participant of the Russian-Ukrainian war (2022, posthumously)
160. Taras Len, Ukrainian serviceman, lieutenant, participant of the Russian-Ukrainian war (2022, posthumously)
161. Vasyl Stefanchuk, Ukrainian serviceman, sergeant, participant of the Russian-Ukrainian war (2022, posthumously)
162. Oleksii Karpiuk, Ukrainian serviceman, senior lieutenant, participant of the Russian-Ukrainian war (2022, posthumously)
163. Vitalii Stadnyk, Ukrainian serviceman, sailor, participant of the Russian-Ukrainian war (2022, posthumously)
164. Volodymyr Kobyletskyi, Ukrainian serviceman, sailor, participant of the Russian-Ukrainian war (2022, posthumously)
165. Oleksandr Sluhotskyi, Ukrainian serviceman, captain, participant of the Russian-Ukrainian war (2022, posthumously)
166. Vitalii Matychak, Ukrainian serviceman, soldier, participant of the Russian-Ukrainian war (2022, posthumously)
167. Eduard Tibekin, Ukrainian serviceman, soldier, participant of the Russian-Ukrainian war (2022, posthumously)
168. Andrii Barskyi, Ukrainian serviceman, chief sergeant, participant of the Russian-Ukrainian war (2022, posthumously)
169. Serhii Haidutskyi, Ukrainian serviceman, senior sailor, participant of the Russian-Ukrainian war (2022, posthumously)
170. Ihor Konotopskyi, Ukrainian serviceman, soldier, participant of the Russian-Ukrainian war (2022, posthumously)
171. Maksym Kyuz, Ukrainian serviceman, senior soldier, participant of the Russian-Ukrainian war (2022, posthumously)
172. Pavlo Lisobei, Ukrainian serviceman, junior sergeant, participant of the Russian-Ukrainian war (2022, posthumously)
173. Yurii Stefanyshyn, Ukrainian serviceman, soldier, participant of the Russian-Ukrainian war (2022, posthumously)
174. Vitalii Naumov, Ukrainian serviceman, soldier, participant of the Russian-Ukrainian war (2022, posthumously)
175. Tymofii Antoshchuk, Ukrainian serviceman, sergeant, participant of the Russian-Ukrainian war (2022, posthumously)
176. Taras Shchyrba, Ukrainian serviceman, soldier, participant of the Russian-Ukrainian war (2022, posthumously)
177. Andrii Fedorov, Ukrainian serviceman, soldier, participant of the Russian-Ukrainian war (2022, posthumously)
178. Oleksandr Biliashevych, Ukrainian serviceman, soldier, participant of the Russian-Ukrainian war (2022, posthumously)
179. Oleksandr Divakov, Ukrainian serviceman, junior sergeant, participant of the Russian-Ukrainian war (2022, posthumously)
180. Mykhailo Levkiv, Ukrainian serviceman, soldier, participant of the Russian-Ukrainian war (2022, posthumously)
181. Vitalii Koval, Ukrainian serviceman, soldier, participant of the Russian-Ukrainian war (2022, posthumously)
182. Vitalii Nevinskyi, Ukrainian serviceman, captain, participant of the Russian-Ukrainian war (2023, posthumously)
183. Volodymyr Danylyshyn, Ukrainian serviceman, senior soldier, participant of the Russian-Ukrainian war (2023, posthumously)
184. Oleh Zubyk, Ukrainian serviceman, soldier, participant of the Russian-Ukrainian war (2023, posthumously)
185. Volodymyr Hvozdyk, Ukrainian serviceman, soldier, participant of the Russian-Ukrainian war (2023, posthumously)
186. Hryhorii Kasianchuk, Ukrainian serviceman, soldier, participant of the Russian-Ukrainian war (2023, posthumously)
187. Serhii Hotsuliak, Ukrainian sapper, lieutenant colonel of the Civil Defense Service of the Main Directorate of the State Emergency Service of Ukraine in Ternopil Oblast, participant in the Russian-Ukrainian war (2023, posthumously)
188. Ivan Bas, Ukrainian serviceman, soldier, participant of the Russian-Ukrainian war (2023, posthumously)
189. Ihor Butryn, Ukrainian serviceman, border guard inspector, participant in the Russian-Ukrainian war (2023, posthumously)
190. Roman Ostapiv, Ukrainian serviceman, senior soldier, participant of the Russian-Ukrainian war (2023, posthumously)
191. Taras Kholiava, Ukrainian serviceman, sergeant, participant of the Russian-Ukrainian war (2023, posthumously)
192. Artur-Artem Khariv, Ukrainian serviceman, soldier, participant of the Russian-Ukrainian war (2023, posthumously)
193. Denys Sikotovskyi, Ukrainian serviceman, senior soldier, participant of the Russian-Ukrainian war (2023, posthumously)
194. Serhii Zablotskyi, Ukrainian serviceman, soldier, participant of the Russian-Ukrainian war (2023, posthumously)
195. Ihor Havryliuk, Ukrainian serviceman, sergeant, participant of the Russian-Ukrainian war (2023, posthumously)
196. Mykhailo Protsyk, Ukrainian serviceman, soldier, participant of the Russian-Ukrainian war (2023, posthumously)
197. Nazarii Shymkiv, Ukrainian serviceman, senior soldier, participant of the Russian-Ukrainian war (2023, posthumously)
198. Vasyl Ohirok, Ukrainian serviceman, soldier, participant of the Russian-Ukrainian war (2023, posthumously)
199. Serhii Khoroshchak, Ukrainian serviceman, soldier, participant of the Russian-Ukrainian war (2023, posthumously)
200. Bohdan Akinzhelyi, Ukrainian serviceman, soldier, participant of the Russian-Ukrainian war (2023, posthumously)
201. Viktor Melnychenko, Ukrainian serviceman, police captain, participant in the Russian-Ukrainian war (2023, posthumously)
202. Ivan Ivanitskyi, Ukrainian serviceman, lieutenant, participant of the Russian-Ukrainian war (2023, posthumously)
203. Dmytro Melnyk, Ukrainian serviceman, junior sergeant, participant of the Russian-Ukrainian war (2023, posthumously)
204. Bohdan Pokitko, Ukrainian serviceman, soldier, participant of the Russian-Ukrainian war (2023, posthumously)
205. Andrii Bozhok, Ukrainian serviceman, soldier, participant of the Russian-Ukrainian war (2023, posthumously)
206. Mykhailo Brikailo, Ukrainian serviceman, private, participant of the Russian-Ukrainian war (2023, posthumously)
207. Serhii Korol, Ukrainian serviceman, captain, participant of the Russian-Ukrainian war (2023, posthumously)
208. Pavlo Buhaiskyi, Ukrainian serviceman, soldier, participant of the Russian-Ukrainian war (2023, posthumously)
209. Oleh Sahaidak, Ukrainian serviceman, senior soldier, participant of the Russian-Ukrainian war (2023, posthumously)
210. Oleksandr Stepankevych, Ukrainian serviceman, senior sergeant, participant of the Russian-Ukrainian war (2023, posthumously)
211. Taras Mudryk, Ukrainian serviceman, soldier, participant of the Russian-Ukrainian war (2023, posthumously)
212. Yosyp Shtrempel, Ukrainian serviceman, soldier, participant of the Russian-Ukrainian war (2023, posthumously)
213. Valerii Danyliuk, Ukrainian serviceman, soldier, participant of the Russian-Ukrainian war (2023, posthumously)
214. Vitalii Rybalskyi, Ukrainian serviceman, soldier, participant of the Russian-Ukrainian war (2023, posthumously)
215. Vitalii Suslenko, Ukrainian serviceman, soldier, participant of the Russian-Ukrainian war (2023, posthumously)
216. Valerii Hinda, Ukrainian serviceman, soldier, participant of the Russian-Ukrainian war (2023, posthumously)
217. Mykhailo Sydorak, Ukrainian serviceman, soldier, participant of the Russian-Ukrainian war (2023, posthumously)
218. Artem Savchenko, Ukrainian serviceman, soldier, participant in the Russian-Ukrainian war (2023, posthumously)
219. Vitalii Zaverukha, Ukrainian volunteer, serviceman, sergeant, participant of the Russian-Ukrainian war (2023, posthumously)
220. Valeriy Kazmirchuk, Ukrainian serviceman, senior soldier, participant of the Russian-Ukrainian war (2023, posthumously)
221. Valerii Dorokhov, Ukrainian serviceman, lieutenant, participant of the Russian-Ukrainian war (2023, posthumously)
222. Myroslav Sydir, Ukrainian serviceman, soldier, participant of the Russian-Ukrainian war (2023, posthumously)
223. Pavlo Matlashevskyi, Ukrainian serviceman, senior soldier, participant of the Russian-Ukrainian war (2023, posthumously)
224. Vasyl-Yakiv Kapustynskyi, Ukrainian public figure, actor, serviceman, assistant grenade launcher, participant in the Russian-Ukrainian war (2023, posthumously)
225. Oleh Barna, Ukrainian public and political activist, human rights activist, teacher, serviceman, assistant grenade launcher, senior sergeant, participant in the Russian-Ukrainian war (2023, posthumously)
226. Roman Lytvyn, Ukrainian serviceman, participant of the Russian-Ukrainian war, soldier (2023, posthumously)
227. Ihor Fedyn, Ukrainian serviceman, participant of the Russian-Ukrainian war, chief sergeant (2023, posthumously)
228. Viktor Klepchyk, Ukrainian serviceman, participant of the Russian-Ukrainian war, private (2023, posthumously)
229. Yurii Bachynskyi, Ukrainian serviceman, participant of the Russian-Ukrainian war, soldier (2023, posthumously)
230. Mykhailo Ivas, Ukrainian serviceman, participant of the Russian-Ukrainian war, soldier (2023, posthumously)
231. Andrii Salomon, Ukrainian serviceman, participant of the Russian-Ukrainian war, soldier (2023, posthumously)
232. Oleksandr Zakharkiv, Ukrainian serviceman, participant of the Russian-Ukrainian war, captain (2023, posthumously)
233. Valentyn Krulevskyi, Ukrainian serviceman, participant of the Russian-Ukrainian war, soldier (2023, posthumously)
234. Stepan Tsiura, Ukrainian serviceman, participant of the Russian-Ukrainian war, soldier (2023, posthumously)
235. Oleksandr Kiniak, Ukrainian serviceman, participant of the Russian-Ukrainian war, staff sergeant (2023, posthumously)
236. Roman Vardetskyi was a Ukrainian serviceman, a participant of the Russian-Ukrainian war, a staff sergeant (2023, posthumously)
237. Denys Kuznetsov, Ukrainian serviceman, participant of the Russian-Ukrainian war, junior sergeant (2023, posthumously)
238. Roman Muran, Ukrainian serviceman, participant of the Russian-Ukrainian war, sergeant (2023, posthumously)
239. Mykola Mykoliv, Ukrainian serviceman, participant of the Russian-Ukrainian war, soldier (2023, posthumously)
240. Dmytro Kochelaba, Ukrainian serviceman, participant of the Russian-Ukrainian war, soldier (2023, posthumously)
241. Mykhailo Petryshyn, Ukrainian serviceman, participant of the Russian-Ukrainian war, soldier (2023, posthumously)
242. Roman Skira, Ukrainian serviceman, participant of the Russian-Ukrainian war, soldier (2023, posthumously)
243. Andrii Oleksii, Ukrainian serviceman, participant of the Russian-Ukrainian war, senior sergeant (2023, posthumously)
244. Volodymyr Yavorskyi, Ukrainian serviceman, participant of the Russian-Ukrainian war, soldier (2023, posthumously)
245. Bohdan Yatsyshyn, Ukrainian serviceman, participant of the Russian-Ukrainian war, senior lieutenant (2023, posthumously)
246. Volodymyr Nakonechnyi, Ukrainian serviceman, participant of the Russian-Ukrainian war, soldier (2023, posthumously)
247. Mykhailo Hladkyi, Ukrainian serviceman, participant of the Russian-Ukrainian war, soldier (2023, posthumously)
248. Ostap Dzhus, Ukrainian serviceman, participant of the Russian-Ukrainian war, soldier (2023, posthumously)
249. Viktor Labiak, Ukrainian serviceman, participant of the Russian-Ukrainian war, senior lieutenant (2023, posthumously)
250. Andrii Volyniak, Ukrainian serviceman, participant of the Russian-Ukrainian war, soldier (2023, posthumously)
251. Ihor Oleshchuk, Ukrainian public and political figure, participant of the national liberation struggle (2023)
252. Serhii Boiko, Ukrainian serviceman, participant of the Russian-Ukrainian war, senior sergeant (2023, posthumously)
253. Volodymyr Harmatii, Ukrainian serviceman, participant of the Russian-Ukrainian war, junior lieutenant (2023, posthumously)
254. Anatolii Hnidyi, Ukrainian serviceman, participant of the Russian-Ukrainian war, senior soldier (2023, posthumously)
255. Viktor Dankiv, Ukrainian serviceman, participant of the Russian-Ukrainian war, senior soldier (2023, posthumously)
256. Oleh Klym, Ukrainian serviceman, participant of the Russian-Ukrainian war, sergeant (2023, posthumously)
257. Oleksandr Misiura, Ukrainian serviceman, participant of the Russian-Ukrainian war, soldier (2023, posthumously)
258. Oleksii Nychyk, Ukrainian serviceman, participant of the Russian-Ukrainian war, soldier (2023, posthumously)
259. Andrii Petlovanyi, Ukrainian serviceman, participant of the Russian-Ukrainian war, senior soldier (2023, posthumously)
260. Dmytro Petrov, Ukrainian serviceman, participant of the Russian-Ukrainian war, senior soldier (2023, posthumously)
261. Bohdan Seniuk, Ukrainian scout, serviceman, participant of the Russian-Ukrainian war, soldier (2023, posthumously)
262. Roman Stusiak, Ukrainian serviceman, participant of the Russian-Ukrainian war, soldier (2023, posthumously)
263. Yurii Furla, Ukrainian serviceman, participant of the Russian-Ukrainian war, senior soldier (2023, posthumously)
264. Bohdan Shevchuk, Ukrainian serviceman, participant of the Russian-Ukrainian war, junior sergeant (2023, posthumously)
