= Valerii Krasnian =

Ukrainian soldier (1971–2022)

- Валерій Краснян
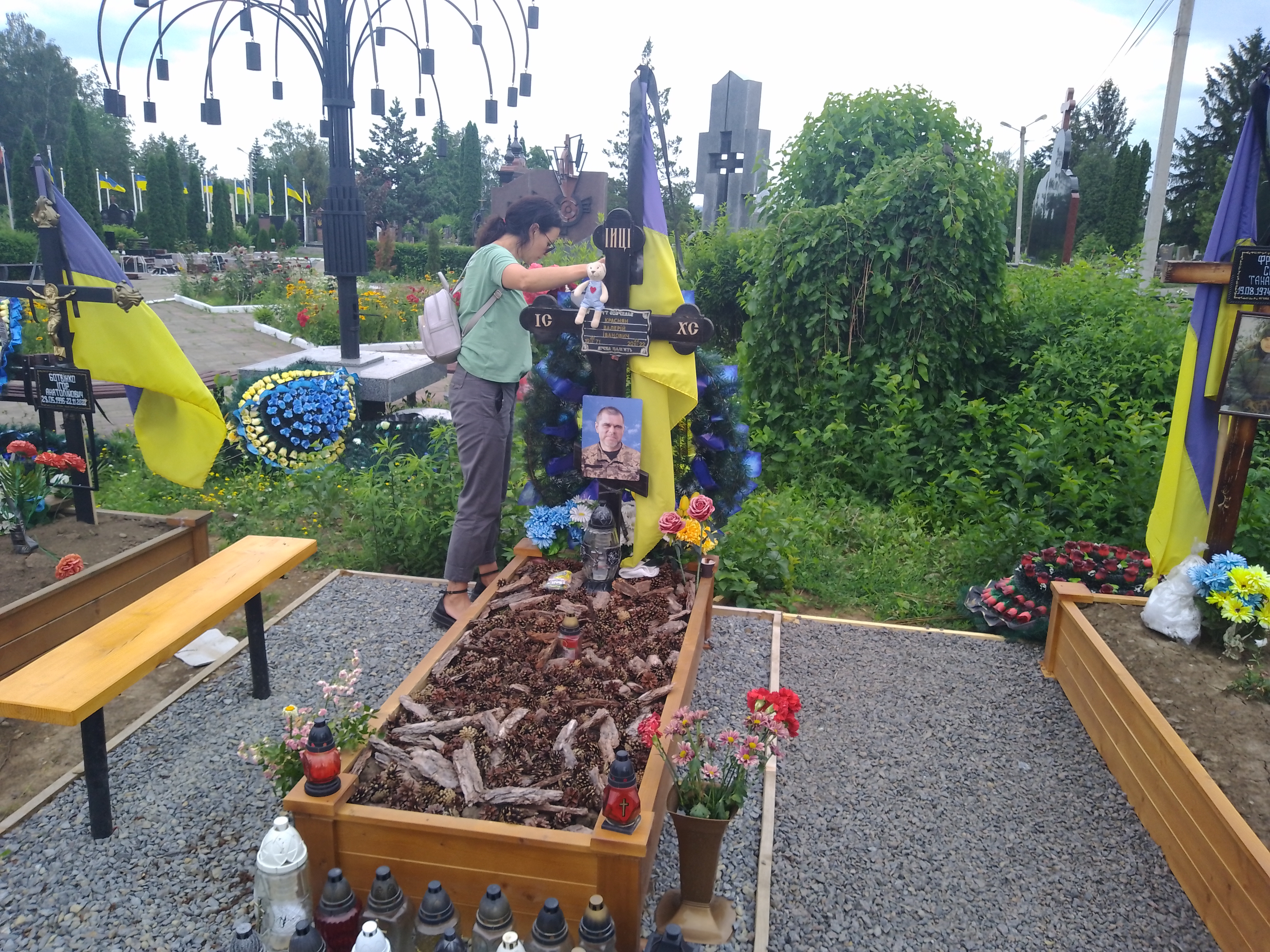
- The gravesite of Valerii Krasnian
- Born: Валерій Іванович Краснян; 20 February 1971; Hlyboka, Chernivtsi Oblast
- Died: 23 November 2022 (aged 51); Kharkiv Oblast
- Burial place: Chernivtsi, Ukraine
- Military career
- Allegiance: Ukraine
- Branch: Armed Forces of Ukraine
- Nickname: Bars (Барс)
- Units: Aidar Battalion; Ukrainian Volunteer Corps; 107th Territorial Defense Brigade
- Conflicts: Russo-Ukrainian War
- Awards: Order of Danylo Halytskyi; People's Hero of Ukraine

Valerii Ivanovych Krasnian (Ukrainian: Валерій Іванович Краснян; 20 February 1971, Hlyboka, Chernivtsi Oblast — 23 November 2022, Kharkiv Oblast) was a Ukrainian volunteer, one of the symbols of the fight for Donetsk airport ("cyborg"), a serviceman of the 107th Territorial Defense Brigade of the Armed Forces of Ukraine, a participant in the Russian-Ukrainian war.

== Biography ==
Valerii Krasnian was born on 20 February 1971 in Hlyboka, now the Hlyboka Hromada, Chernivtsi Raion, Chernivtsi Oblast, Ukraine. Krasnian studied at Hlyboka secondary school. In 1996, Krasnian joined the Tryzub public organization of Stepan Bandera followers, where he became friends with Dmytro Yarosh.

=== Volunteering to fight ===
In the Fall of 2014, he volunteered for the Aidar battalion. He participated in the battles for Shchastia, Vesela Hora, Metalist, Savur-Mohyla. Krasnian took the wounded out of Ilovaisk. Later he joined the Ukrainian Volunteer Corps under call sign Bars and was appointed commander of the 2nd Assault Company of the 5th Battalion. The company fought in the hottest spots – Pisky, Donetsk airport, Butivka coal mine.

=== Supporting veterans ===
In 2015, he became the head of the Center for Assistance to ATO Participants. Krasnian was a representative of the President for ATO participants and an advisor to the head of the Chernivtsi Regional State Administration. He held the position of Chief Specialist of the Department of the Regional State Administration.

=== Defending Ukraine in 2022 ===
With the beginning of the full-scale Russian invasion, he returned from abroad and joined the Ukrainian Volunteer Army in February 2022 (where he headed the Bars Company in his native 5th Battalion), and in the summer of 2022 – the 107th Territorial Defense Brigade. He participated in the battles for Kyiv, Kharkiv and Kharkiv Oblast.

Krasnian died on 23 November 2022 during a combat mission in the Kharkiv Oblast, from a bomb explosion. He was buried on 27 November 2022 on the Walk of Fame in Chernivtsi. He is survived by his wife, daughter and son.

== Awards ==
- Order of Danylo Halytskyi (1 December 2018)
- Order "People's Hero of Ukraine" (2018)
- Medal "For the Glory of Chernivtsi" (2023)

== Honoring the memory ==
In February 2023, a memorial plaque to Valerii Krasnian was unveiled on the facade of the Hlyboka Gymnasium.

In September 2023, Chernivtsi hosted the premiere screening of the film Bars. Nezakinchena sprava (directed by Mariia Yaremchuk, produced by Volodymyr Khanas).

== Interesting facts ==
A wax figure of the Chernivtsi "cyborg" Valerii Krasnian was made for the exhibition "Nashi" of the National Museum of the History of Ukraine in the Second World War, which stands against the background of the DAP tower.
