= Yuriy Halushkin =

Ukrainian military commander

- Юрій Алімович Галушкін
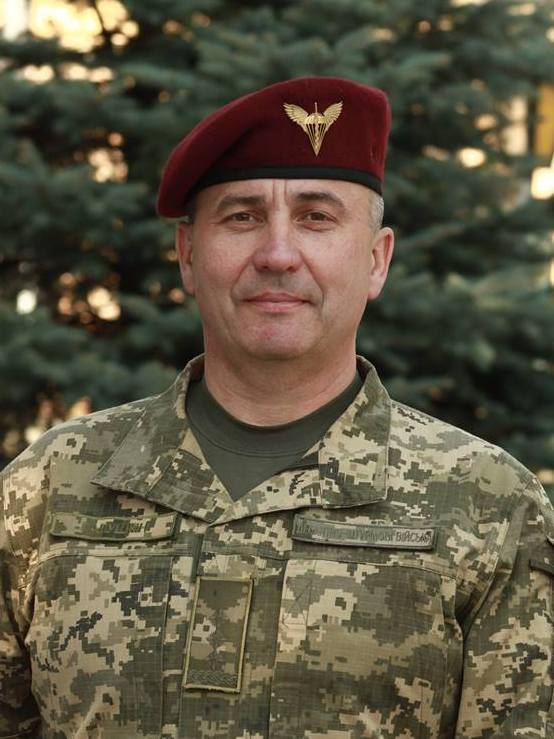
- Born: Yuriy Alimovych Halushkin; June 26, 1971 (age 55); Khorol, Ukrainian SSR, Soviet Union (now Ukraine)
- Military career
- Allegiance: Soviet Union; Ukraine
- Branch: Ukrainian Ground Forces
- Rank: Brigadier general
- Commands: Territorial Defense Forces
- Conflicts: 2022 Russian invasion of Ukraine

Yuriy Alimovych Halushkin (Ukrainian: Юрій Алімович Галушкін; born 26 June 1971) is a Ukrainian brigadier general and former Commander of the Territorial Defense Forces from 1 January 2022 until May 15, 2022. On 15 May 2022 Yuriy Halushkin was dismissed by president Volodymyr Zelenskyy and replaced with Major General Ihor Tantsyura as Commander of the Territorial Defense Forces of the Ukrainian Armed Forces.
