= 122nd Territorial Defense Brigade =

Ukrainian Territorial Defense Forces unit

- Ukrainian: 122-га окрема бригада територіальної оборони
- Active: 30 June 2018 - present
- Country: Ukraine
- Branch: Armed Forces of Ukraine
- Type: Military reserve force
- Role: Light infantry
- Part of: Territorial Defense Forces
- Garrison/HQ: Odesa Oblast; MUN А7051

The 122nd Territorial Defense Brigade (Ukrainian: 122-га окрема бригада територіальної оборони) is a military formation of the Territorial Defense Forces of Ukraine in Odesa Oblast. It is part of Operational Command South.

== History ==
=== Formation ===
On 30 June 2018 the brigade was formed in Odesa Oblast. On 11 December 2018 300 to 500 reservist took part in a training exercise in Odesa. From 5 to 9 June 2019 a large scale exercise involving all battalions took place.

184th Battalion was formed in Artsyz and in early part of 2022 it moved to Bolhrad.

=== Russo-Ukrainian War ===
==== 2022 Russian invasion of Ukraine ====
On 14 October, the brigade received its battle flag.

On 23 November soldiers from 185th Battalion shot down a S-300 missile using DShK heavy machine gun.

== Structure ==
As of 2022 the brigade's structure is as follows:

- Headquarters
- 180th Territorial Defense Battalion (Borshchi, Podilsk Raion) MUN А7346
- 181st Territorial Defense Battalion (Rozdilna) MUN А7347
- 182nd Territorial Defense Battalion (Bilhorod-Dnistrovskyi) MUN А7348
- 183rd Territorial Defense Battalion (Chornomorsk) MUN А7349
- 184th Territorial Defense Battalion (Bolhrad) MUN А7350
- 185th Territorial Defense Battalion (Yuzhne) MUN А7351
- Engineering Company
- Communication Company
- Logistics Company
- Mortar Battery

== Commanders ==
- Colonel Oleh Berezovskyi 2018 – 2022
- Colonel Serhii Shcherbina 2023 – present

== Notable members ==
- Vasiliy Lomachenko, professional boxer.

== See also ==
- Territorial Defense Forces of the Armed Forces of Ukraine
