= Bohdan Seniuk =

Ukrainian soldier (2001–2023)

- Богдан Сенюк
- Born: Bohdan Olehovych Seniuk; 15 March 2001; Ivano-Frankivsk, Ukraine
- Died: 7 August 2023 (aged 22); Kherson Oblast, Ukraine
- Military career
- Allegiance: Ukraine
- Branch: Armed Forces of Ukraine
- Rank: Soldier
- Nickname: Bahdad (Багдад)
- Conflicts: Russo-Ukrainian War
- Awards: Honorary Citizen of Ternopil

Bohdan Olehovych Seniuk (Ukrainian: Богдан Олегович Сенюк; 15 March 2001 — 7 August 2023) was a Ukrainian scout, serviceman, soldier of the Armed Forces of Ukraine, participant of the Russian-Ukrainian war.

== Biography ==
Bohdan Seniuk was born on 15 March 2001 in Ivano-Frankivsk.

Later he moved to Ternopil with his family.

Seniuk graduated from the History Department of the Ivan Franko National University of Lviv. He defended his thesis in Sievierodonetsk.

From 2012 he was a member of Plast, and a member of the Tampliierys group of the 13th Oleksa Dovbush Kuren in Ternopil. He was a participant in actions and trips, including "Stezhkamy Heroiv" and "Den Plastyna". Additionally he was a member of the public organisation "Tradytsiia and Poriadok".

At the beginning of the large-scale Russian invasion of Ukraine, he was at the front. He served as a machine gunner in the Revansh tactical group, with which he participated in the battles for Kyiv, Bakhmut, Sievierodonetsk, and Kherson. He had a mild concussion.

In October 2022, he was transferred to another special unit.

Bohdan Seniuk died on 7 August 2023 during a combat mission on the left bank of the Dnipro River (Kherson Oblast). He was 22. Seniuk was buried on 21 August, at the Pantheon of Heroes of the Mykulynetskyi Cemetery in Ternopil.

== Awards and honors ==
- Honorary Citizen of Ternopil (21 August 2023, posthumously)
- Award of the Defence Intelligence of Ukraine (13 March 2023)
