= 115th Territorial Defense Brigade =

Ukrainian Territorial Defense Forces unit

- Ukrainian: 115-та окрема бригада територіальної оборони
- Active: 27 June 2018 - present
- Country: Ukraine
- Branch: Armed Forces of Ukraine
- Type: Military reserve force
- Role: Light infantry
- Part of: Territorial Defense Forces
- Garrison/HQ: Zhytomyr Oblast; MUN А7043

Insignia
- Flag

The 115th Territorial Defense Brigade (Ukrainian: 115-та окрема бригада територіальної оборони) is a military formation of the Territorial Defense Forces of Ukraine in Zhytomyr Oblast. It is part of Operational Command North.

== History ==
=== Formation ===
On 27 June 2018 the brigade was formed in Zhytomyr Oblast.

During September 2019 330 reservists from 139th battalions took part in a training exercise. After it concluded a new larger scale Brigade wide exercise, involving over 1,500 troops took place.

From 22 September to 1 October 2021 Ukraine held large scale exercise "United efforts-2021". Over 1,300 soldiers and reservists from the brigade participated. 143rd battalion and 300 soldiers from 139th battalion took part in that exercise.

On 26 January 2022 commander Colonel Muzhuk Mykhailo, informed that Brigade was 70% formed.

=== Russo-Ukrainian War ===
==== Russian invasion of Ukraine ====
In early march, unit of brigade captured an enemy Ural truck. On 3 October 2022, the brigade received its battle flag. Brigade is defending north border with Belarus, improving defensive positions and continuously training and destroying HESA Shahed 136 drone.

== Structure ==
As of 2022 the brigade's structure is as follows:

- Headquarters
- 138th Territorial Defense Battalion (Zhytomyr) MUN А7304
- 139th Territorial Defense Battalion (Berdychiv) MUN А7305
- 140th Territorial Defense Battalion (Zviahel) MUN А7306
- 141st Territorial Defense Battalion (Ovruch) MUN А7307
- 142nd Territorial Defense Battalion (Malyn) MUN А7308
- 143rd Territorial Defense Battalion (Korosten) MUN А7309
- Counter-Sabotage Company
- Engineering Company
- Communication Company
- Logistics Company
- Mortar Battery

== Commanders ==
- Colonel Muzhuk Mykhailo 2021 - 2022
- Colonel Makovskyi Vitalii 2022 - present

== See also ==
- Territorial Defense Forces of the Armed Forces of Ukraine
