= Vitaly Derekh =

Ukrainian journalist and soldier (1987–2022)

- Віталій Дерех
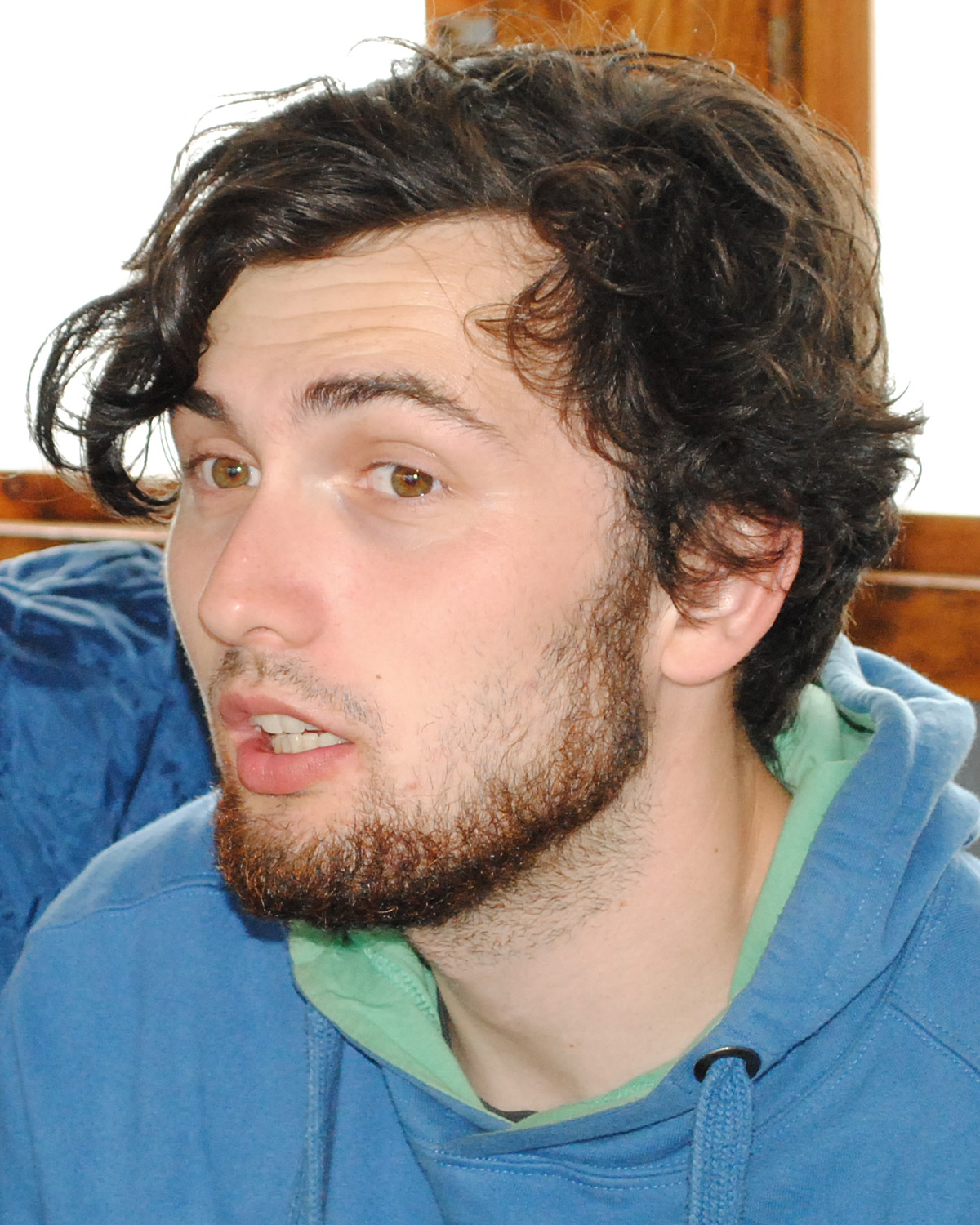
- Derekh in 2012
- Born: Vitaly Myroslavovych Derekh; 3 September 1987; Ternopil, Ukrainian SSR, Soviet Union (now Ukraine)
- Died: 28 May 2022 (aged 34); Popasna, Luhansk Oblast, Ukraine
- Resting place: Mykulynetsky Cemetery
- Occupations: Journalist; public activist
- Military career
- Allegiance: Ukraine
- Branch: Ukrainian Ground Forces
- Service years: 2014–2015; 2022
- Rank: Junior Sergeant
- Units: Aidar Battalion; 1st Special Purpose Brigade
- Conflicts: Russo-Ukrainian war; War in Donbas; Russian invasion of Ukraine; Northern Ukraine campaign; Battle of Kyiv; Eastern Ukraine campaign; Luhansk Oblast campaign; Battle of Popasna †

Vitaly Myroslavovych Derekh (Ukrainian: Віталій Мирославович Дерех; 3 September 1987 – 28 May 2022) was a Ukrainian journalist, public activist and soldier who was posthumously awarded the Hero of Ukraine in 2023.

== Early career ==
Since Vitaly was six years old, he had been actively involved in Plast, a Ukrainian scouting organization. He later became a Scoutmaster at Ivan Havdida Unit 77. At the age of 16, he took part in the Orange Revolution. Since 2009, he had been employed as a journalist by the Media Corporation.

On 20 February 2014, he had been removing the injured from Instytutska Street, while served with the 15th Maidan Self-Defense Unit during the Revolution of Dignity. He worked for the 20 Minutes newspaper. Among other things, in 2013 he went on an editorial trip to South Africa.

Vitaly was employed by the Ivano-Frankivsk Municipal Guard from 2016 until 2018, specifically serving as a rescuer. He enlisted in the Maltese Aid Service in 2016 while pursuing a first aid and rescue certification. Vitaly had a particular interest in technical rescue and personally led several first aid trainings in Ternopil. On occasions when the Maltese Aid Service was active, he always took part in patrols.

== Military career ==
From the spring of 2014 until July 2015, Vitaly served with the Aidar Battalion and took part in the War in Donbas. For his valiant actions of saving a comrade's life, he was granted the Plast's Bronze Cross and the Order for Courage of the Third Degree.

Vitaly returned to military service on 24 February 2022, during the Russian invasion of Ukraine. In March, he participated in fighting both in the Luhansk Oblast campaign and in the Battle of Kyiv. He commanded an anti-tank division to destroy a number of Russian tanks along with several other vehicles. On 28 May, he was killed in action at the age of 34, by an air strike near Popasna during the Battle of Bakhmut.

Hundreds of Ternopil citizens flocked to the Archcathedral on 1 June 2022, to pay their final respects, where they customarily said goodbye to Vitaly. The next day, he was laid to rest at Mykulynetsky Cemetery's Alley of Heroes. The War Is Not Over Yet picture exhibition detailing the more than 500 crimes Russians have perpetrated against the media since 24 February 2022, debuted on Ternopil's Taras Shevchenko Boulevard. The display includes Vitaly Derekh's story.

== Personal life ==
Born on 3 September 1987, in the Ukrainian city of Ternopil.

== Honours ==
Vitaly Derekh was honored with a military settlement in May 2022, which was part of the 3rd Battalion of the Ivan Bohun First Separate Special Forces Brigade. Vitaly has received honours and recognitions such as:

- Hero of Ukraine Order of the Gold Star (8 July 2023)
- Order for Courage Third Class (6 September 2016)
- Honorary Citizen of Ternopil Oblast (2023)
- Honorary Citizens of Ternopil (22 August 2022)
