= Ihor Plakhuta =

Ukrainian military general

- Ігор Вікторович Плахута
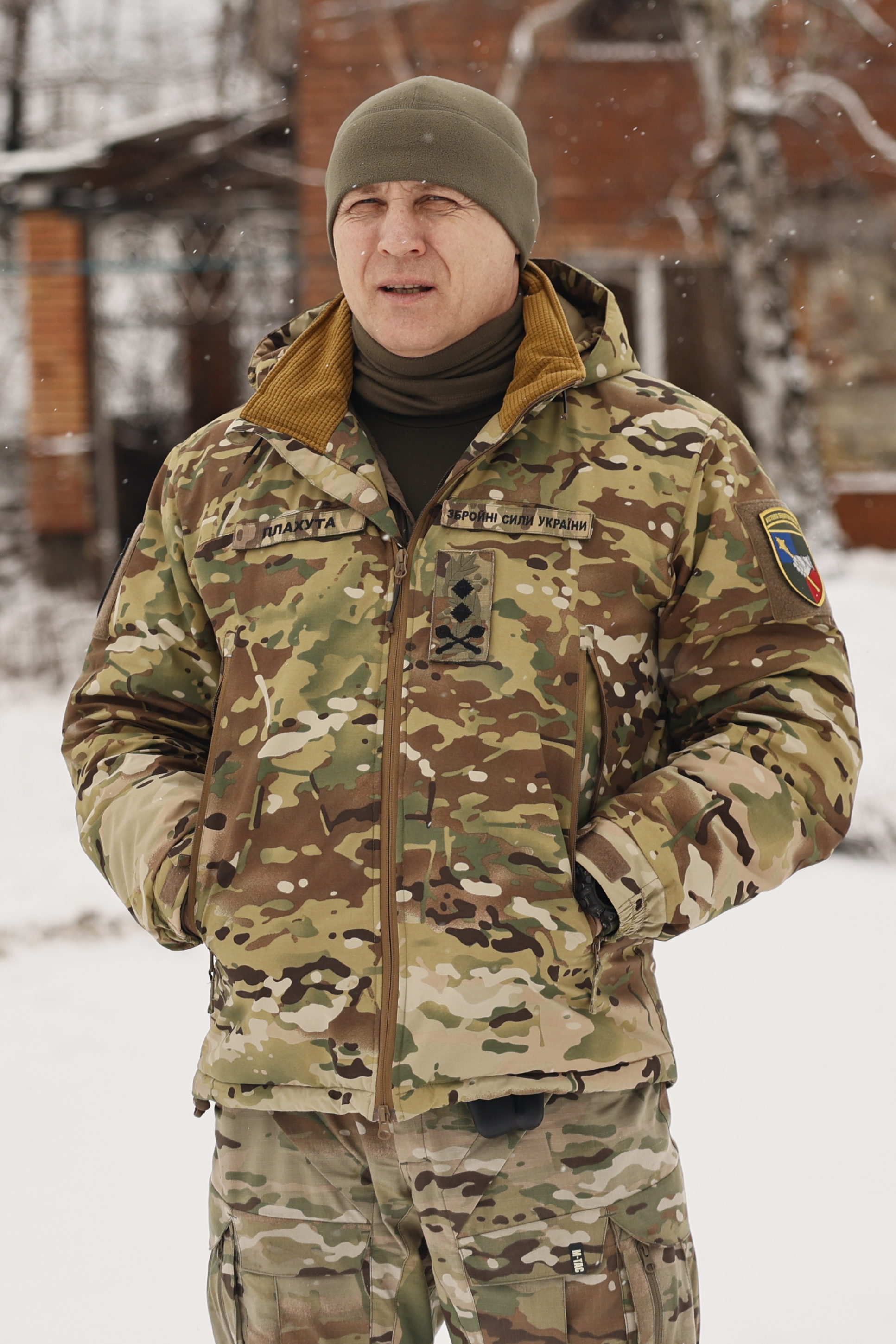
- Plakhuta in 2024
- Born: 1 September 1967 (age 59); Korobchyne, Kirovohrad Oblast, Ukrainian SSR, Soviet Union
- Education: Alma-Ata Higher Combined Arms Command School
- Military career
- Allegiance: Ukraine
- Branch: Armed Forces of Ukraine
- Service years: 2000–2014, 2024–present
- Rank: Major General
- Commands: Territorial Defence Forces Command (2024–)
- Conflicts: Russo-Ukrainian War; War in Donbas; Russian invasion of Ukraine

Ihor Viktorovych Plakhuta (Ukrainian: Ігор Вікторович Плахута; born 1 September 1967) is a Ukrainian military officer who is the current commander of the Ukrainian Territorial Defence Forces. He was formerly in charge of the Internal Troops of the Ministry of Internal Affairs during the Euromaidan dispersal.

== Biography ==
From 2005 to 2008, he served as the commander of the Separate Presidential Brigade.

As of 2009, he was the commander of the 169th Training Centre. Later, he was the head of the Southern Territorial Command of the Internal Troops of the Ministry of Internal Affairs of Ukraine. In 2013-2014, during the Euromaidan, he worked in the Ministry of Internal Affairs and led the Internal Troops forces that dispersed the protesters.

After the Revolution of Dignity, he retired and took up the position of Deputy Rector of the Institute of the State Security Administration.

From 2018 to 2019, he was the Deputy Head of the Institute of the State Protection Department of the Taras Shevchenko National University of Kyiv.

On 11 February 2024, President Zelenskyy appointed him Commander of the Territorial Defence Forces of the Armed Forces of Ukraine.

== Military ranks ==
- Major general (December 1, 2009)
