= 120th Territorial Defense Brigade =

Ukrainian Territorial Defense Forces unit

- Ukrainian: 120-та окрема бригада територіальної оборони
- Active: 30 June 2018 - present
- Country: Ukraine
- Branch: Armed Forces of Ukraine
- Type: Military reserve force
- Role: Light infantry
- Part of: Territorial Defense Forces
- Garrison/HQ: Vinnytsia Oblast; MUN А7048
- Engagements: Russian Invasion of Ukraine: 2023 Ukrainian counteroffensive; Pokrovsk offensive

Insignia
- Flag

The 120th Territorial Defense Brigade (Ukrainian: 120-та окрема бригада територіальної оборони) is a military formation of the Territorial Defense Forces of Ukraine in Vinnytsia Oblast. It is part of Operational Command South.

== History ==
=== Formation ===
On 10 July 2018, the brigade was formed in Vinnytsia Oblast. 30 June is the date of creation given by Regional Directorate of Territorial Defense Forces "South" of the Armed Forces of Ukraine. Colonel Valerii Kutsenko was the first commander. Toward the end of 2018 he was replaced by Lieutenant colonel Yurii Paradiuk.

From 12 to 19 August 2019 large scale exercise was held, similar exercise was held during previous year.

168th battalion was formed in Tomashpil. From 12 to 19 August 2019, it took part in brigade training exercise.

On 7 January 2022 colonel Yurii Paradiuk announced that brigade had vacancies for nearly half of positions. Also he stated that brigade had a battalion in the six raions: Haisyn, Khmilnyk, Mohyliv-Podilskyi, Tulchyn, Vinnytsia, Zhmerynka and another in city of Vinnytsia.

Since Tomashpil Raion was reorganized and merged into Tulchyn Raion there were two battalions in same raion. 168th battalion was moved to neighboring Haisyn Raion, to Ladyzhyn in January 2022. The battalion was 70% formed by 21 February.

=== Russo-Ukrainian War ===
==== 2022 Russian invasion of Ukraine ====
173rd Battalion was stationed near Bakhmut during the summer for forty-nine days.

During first year of the war units from the brigade fought in Sloviansk, Izium, Soledar, Bakhmut, Pisky and Novobohdanivka.

On 14 October 2022, the brigade received its battle flag.

Part of the 173rd Battalion were stationed in Soledar and Bakhmut in early 2023. In March the battalion returned from Bakhmut for rest and recuperation.

Around September 2023, the brigade was involved in combat actions around Velika Novosilka during the 2023 counteroffensive.

On 26 September 2024, the brigade's 210th Battalion was deployed to the city of Hirnyk. After the left flank around Hirnyk collapsed, the battalion attempted to withdraw but a blocking detachment from the 110th Mechanized Brigade threatened soldiers of the 210th Battalion with severe disciplinary actions or execution if they retreated.

== Structure ==
As of 2022 the brigade's structure is as follows:

- 120th Territorial Defense Brigade
  - Headquarters and Service Company
    - 168th Territorial Defense Battalion (Ladyzhyn) MUN А7334
    - 169th Territorial Defense Battalion (Tulchyn) MUN А7335
    - 170th Territorial Defense Battalion (Zhmerynka) MUN А7336
    - 171st Territorial Defense Battalion (Nemyriv) MUN А7337
    - 172nd Territorial Defense Battalion (Mohyliv-Podilskyi) MUN А7338
    - 173rd Territorial Defense Battalion (Koziatyn) MUN А7339
    - 210th Territorial Defense Battalion (Pultivtsi) MUN А7379
  - Engineering Company
  - Communication Company
  - Logistics Company
  - Mortar Battery
  - Anti-Aircraft unit

== Commanders ==
- Colonel Valerii Kutsenko 2018
- Colonel Yurii Paradiuk 2018 - present

== See also ==
- Territorial Defense Forces of the Armed Forces of Ukraine
