= Valerii Dorokhov =

Ukrainian entrepreneur and soldier (1991–2023)

- Валерій Дорохов
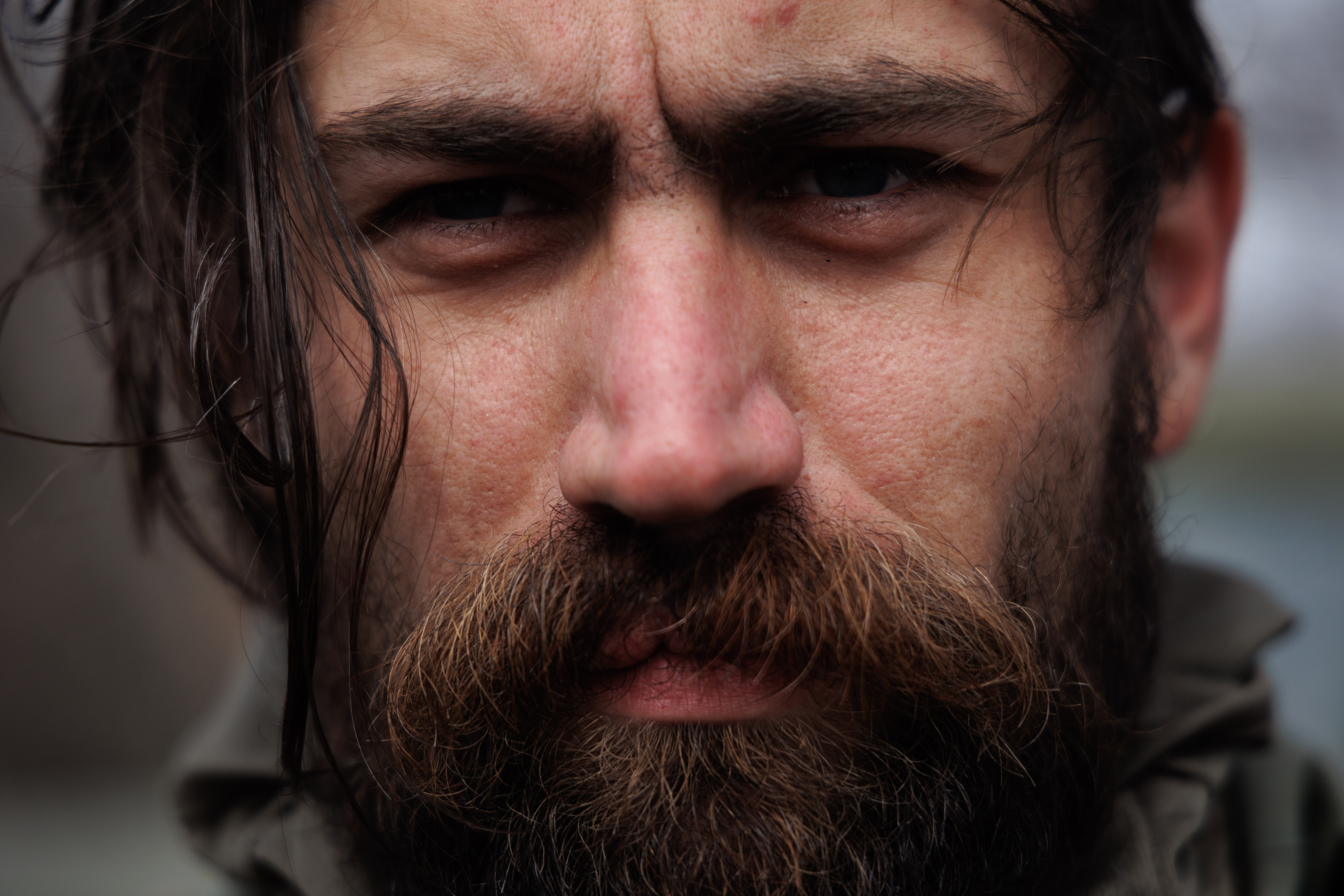

Personal details
- Born: Valerii Valeriiovych Dorokhov; 21 June 1991 Ternopil
- Died: 17 April 2023 (aged 31) Donetsk Oblast, Ukraine
- Education: Ternopil National Economic University
- Nickname: Roland (Роланд)

Military service
- Allegiance: Ukraine
- Branch/service: Armed Forces of Ukraine
- Rank: Lieutenant
- Battles/wars: Russo-Ukrainian War
- Awards: Order of Bohdan Khmelnytskyi; Honorary Citizen of Ternopil

Valerii Valeriiovych Dorokhov (Ukrainian: Валерій Валерійович Дорохов, 21 June 1991, Ternopil – 17 April 2023, Donetsk Oblast) was a Ukrainian entrepreneur, serviceman, lieutenant of the 68th Jaeger Brigade of the Armed Forces of Ukraine, a participant in the Russian-Ukrainian war, commander of Oleh Barna.

== Biography ==
Valerii Dorokhov was born on 21 June 1991 in Ternopil.

He graduated from the Law Faculty of the Ternopil National Economic University.

He was the owner of the Tigerbox restaurant in Ternopil.

With the beginning of the full-scale Russian invasion of Ukraine in 2022, he was appointed platoon commander of the security company of the Ternopil City TCC and JV. Then he became the commander of a combat platoon of the 68th Jaeger Brigade. He died on 17 April 2023, together with Oleh Barna during an assault on the occupiers' positions in Donetsk Oblast.

On 21 April 2023, the funeral services for Valerii Dorokhov and Oleh Barna were held at the Saint Michael's Golden-Domed Cathedral and on Maidan Nezalezhnosti in Kyiv. Hundreds of people came to pay their respects, including Petro and Maryna Poroshenko.

He was buried on 22 April 2023 on the Alley of Heroes of the Mykulynetskyi Cemetery in Ternopil.

The mother is deceased.

== Awards ==
- Order of Bohdan Khmelnytskyi, 3rd class (24 August 2023, posthumously)
- Honorary Citizen of Ternopil (April 28, 2023, posthumously)
