= Territorial Defence Forces (Ukraine) =

Branch of Armed Forces of Ukraine

- Війська територіальної оборони (Ukrainian)
- Founded: 2014 (unofficially); 2022 (officially)
- Country: Ukraine
- Type: Military reserve force
- Role: Light infantry Home guard
- Part of: Armed Forces of Ukraine
- Anniversaries: The first Sunday of October
- Engagements: Russo-Ukrainian War; War in Donbas; Russian invasion of Ukraine

Commanders
- Current commander: Major General Ihor Plakhuta

Insignia
- Shoulder sleeve insignia

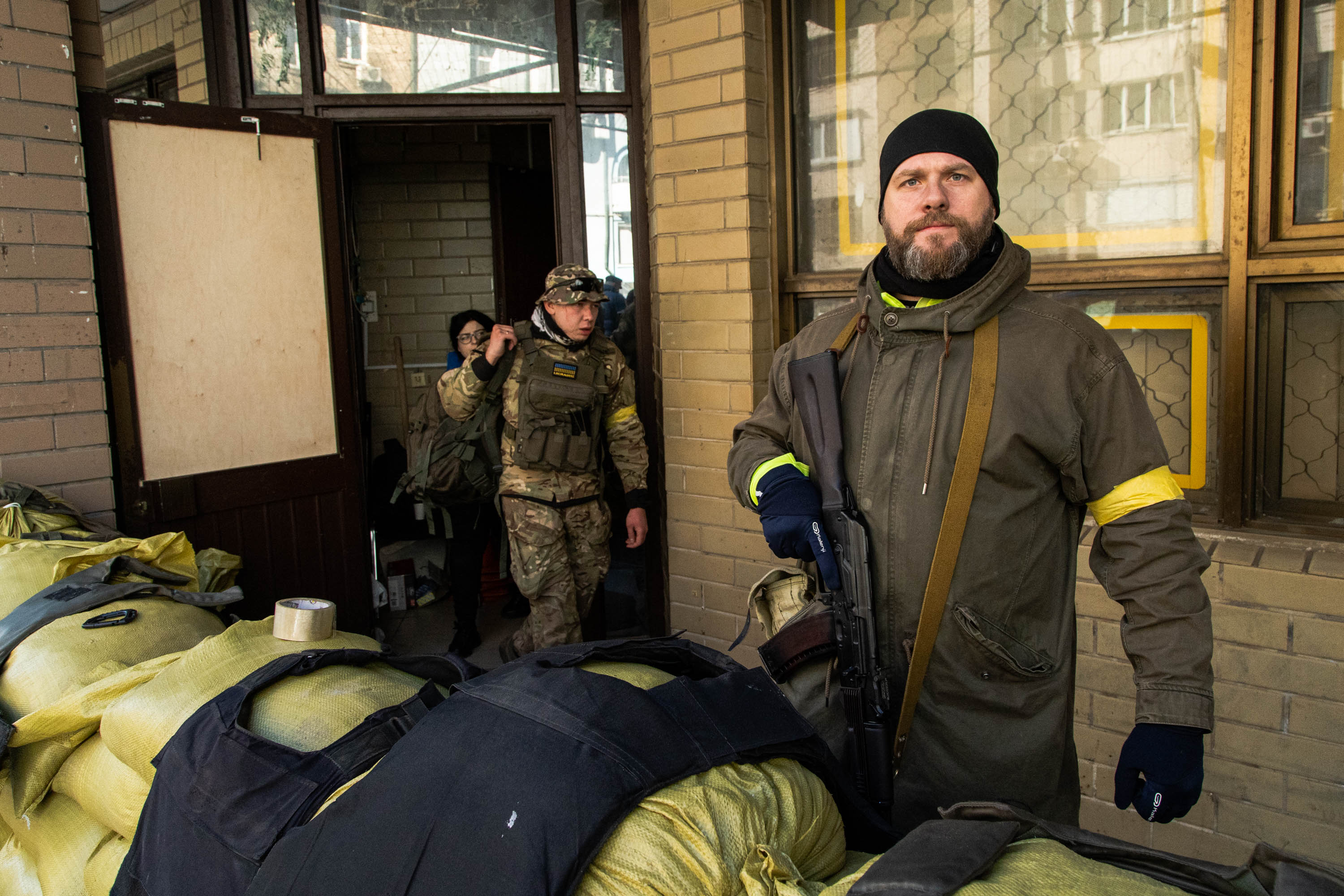
Territorial Defence soldiers during the battle of Kyiv, 25 February 2022

The Territorial Defence Forces (abbr. TDF; Ukrainian: Війська територіальної оборони, romanized: Viiska terytorialnoi oborony, pronounced [wijsʲˈkɑ terɪtor⁽ʲ⁾iˈɑlʲnoji oboˈrɔnɪ], abbr. ВТО, VTO) are the military reserve component of the Armed Forces of Ukraine.

The Territorial Defence Forces were formed after the reorganization of the Territorial Defence Battalions, volunteer militias created during the war in Donbas under the command of the Ministry of Defence. Territorial Defence units existed from 2015 until 2021 in semi-organized forms until January 2022 when they were officially organized into a unified corps that formed a separate branch of the Armed Forces of Ukraine.

It is formed by a core of part-time reservists, usually former combat veterans, and in cases of war can be expanded to include local civilian volunteers for local defense, in a case of mass mobilization, with the core expected to lead the mobilized volunteers. The TDF was officially activated with the start of the 2022 Russian invasion of Ukraine, and more than 100,000 civilians had volunteered by March.

The International Legion of Territorial Defence of Ukraine (ILTD), formed by foreign volunteers, was part of the Territorial Defense Forces up to 2023.

== History ==
In 2014 the Armed Forces of Ukraine suffered a series of military defeats; the Annexation of Crimea by Russia led to the takeover of the peninsula as most of the military either surrendered without resistance or defected to Russia. While in the initial stages war in Donbas, the Ukrainian military had a number of setbacks and defeats against the pro-Russian separatist forces, as they were ill-prepared, ill-equipped, lacking in professionalism, morale, fighting spirit and with severe incompetence in the high command.

As the Donbas situation deteriorated, many civilians started to form volunteer militias and paramilitary groups to fight the separatists, known as the "Volunteer Battalions". The Ministry of Defence of Ukraine started to organize and mobilize some of these units under their command as the Territorial Defence Battalions. The Territorial Defense Battalions and other Volunteer Battalions were credited with having held the line against separatist forces and allowing the Ukrainian military to reorganize and mobilize.

In late 2014 the system of territorial defense of Ukraine changed. Territorial defense battalions were reorganized and transferred to the mechanized infantry brigade of the Army. To replace them, a new structure of the territorial defense forces of the Armed Forces was gradually introduced.

The example of Ukrainian Forces was later used by Poland to build its own armed forces, which from 2015 and on implemented a similar practice.

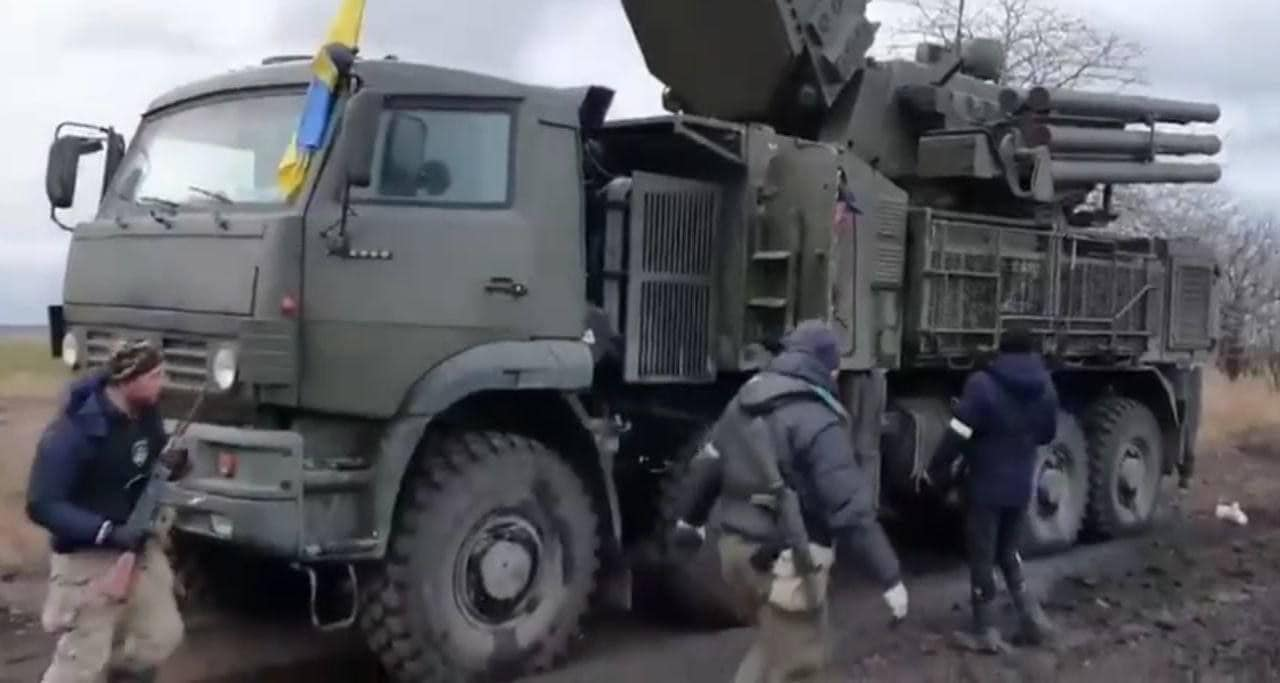
Territorial Defense Forces partisans capture an abandoned Pantsir missile system.

On 25 May 2021, President Volodymyr Zelenskyy introduced a law to the Verkhovna Rada (Ukraine's national parliament) "on the basis of national resistance" that proposed to increase the number of the territorial forces by 11,000 servicemen. The old Territorial Defence units would be now organized under the new Territorial Defense Forces as a standalone branch of the Armed Forces. Veterans of the Donbas war from the Armed Forces of Ukraine, National Guard of Ukraine and other paramilitary forces involved in the conflict would provide a backbone to train and lead the mobilized volunteers. On 16 July 2021 parliament approved this bill, and on 29 July 2021 Zelenskyy signed the law. On 1 January 2022, the Territorial Defence Forces were officially activated. The creation of the branch coincided with the Russian military build-up which had been ongoing since 2021.

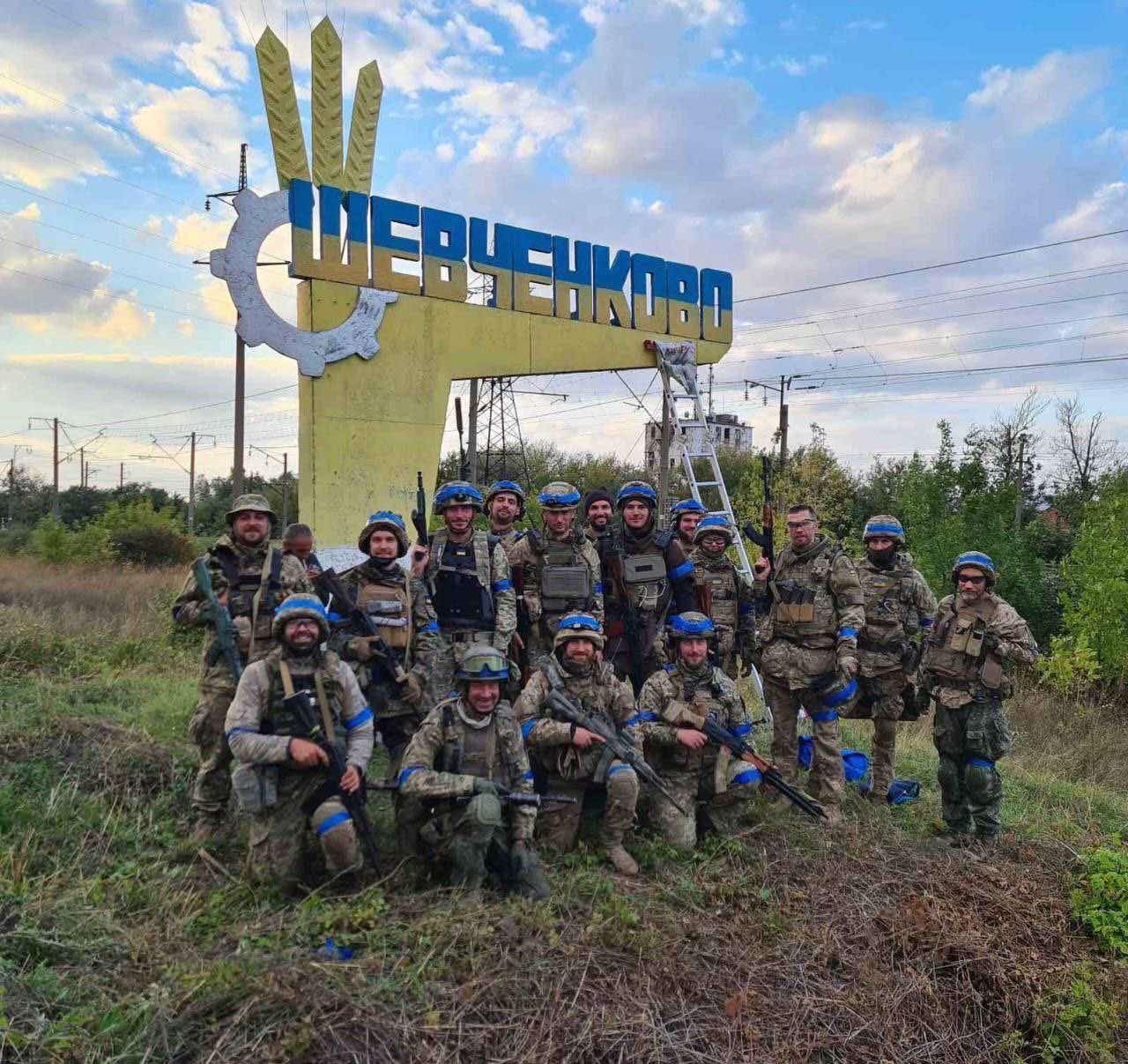
Territorial Defense Forces soldiers pose in front of the sign of Shevchenkove, then recently captured after the Kharkiv counteroffensive

On 11 February 2022, the planned number of volunteers was increased from 1.5 to 2 million.

As a result of the 2022 Russian invasion of Ukraine, the Territorial Defense Forces reserves were activated and many civilians joined local Territorial Defense Forces groups to fight the Russian invaders. On 25 February, during the rapid Russian offensive into Kyiv, the Ukrainian government distributed 18,000 guns for people wishing to fight in Kyiv. For the next few days, the Territorial Forces were engaged in various combat situations and battles around Ukraine, supporting the Ukrainian Ground Forces and National Guard of Ukraine. By 6 March, almost 100,000 people had volunteered for the Territorial Defense Forces. Some units stopped accepting volunteers as they reached their operational limit. There were reports of Ukrainian volunteers paying bribes or using connections to join the Territorial Defense.

On 27 February, as a result of many foreigners volunteering to fight for Ukraine, President Zelenskyy created the International Legion of Territorial Defense of Ukraine, a foreign legion which was placed under the command of the Territorial Defense Forces. the Bratstvo battalion, was active in multiple major campaigns during the 2022 invasion, including the defense of Kyiv, the Kharkiv counteroffensive, and the liberation of Kherson. It is currently conducting riverine operations through its special forces unit.

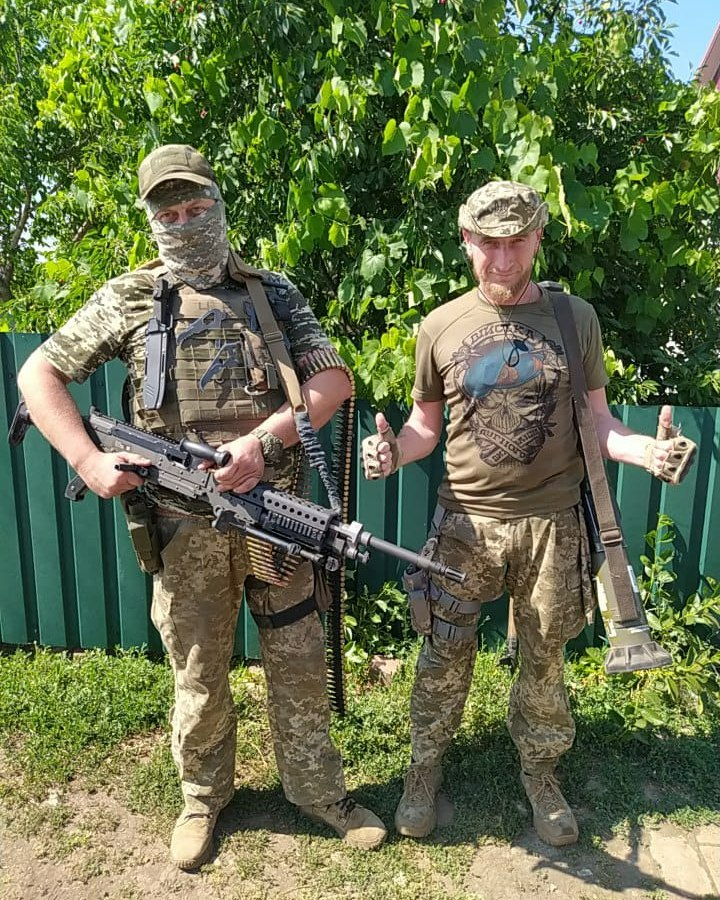
Two Territorial Defense soldiers, showing an M240 machine gun and an AT4 anti-tank rocket launcher

The Territorial Defense Forces were in charge of engaging in Partisan work and Guerrilla warfare on territory occupied by Russian forces. In Kherson, local civilians joined local TDF units and formed cells in order to provide Partisan work, such as espionage, sabotage, assassination and reconnaissance. In September 2022, the 113th Territorial Defense Brigade also partook in the Kharkiv counteroffensive namely in the direction of Vovchansk. Ukrainian units liberated most of the Kharkiv Oblast following the collapse of Russian frontline forces. This has been attributed to the lack of secondary and tertiary defensive lines.

Ukraine's TDF had been historically receiving less and worse equipment than regular ZSU and National Guard forces while at the same time being frequently operating in hot zones where general armed forces would be more suitable. This tendency to plug gaps in defense with TDF, leading to increased losses and defense failures, had been one of the points of criticism of Ukrainian military command.

In June 2026, the Commander-in-Chief of the Armed Forces of Ukraine, Oleksandr Syrskyi, announced the decision to scale up the unmanned component in the territorial defense brigades. According to him, this should increase the capabilities of the units in conducting reconnaissance, striking the enemy and protecting designated areas of responsibility. It was also announced the formation of new units of unmanned systems to strengthen the defense of the state border in the northern direction and further increase the capabilities of the reserves of the Armed Forces of Ukraine.

== Tasks ==
In accordance with the Constitution and legislation passed by the Supreme Council, the TDF fulfills the following missions:

- Protection of public authorities, local governments, critical facilities, important public enterprises and communications
- Deployment at checkpoints
- Combating sabotage and intelligence forces of the enemy and any illegal armed formations and looters
- Maintaining safety and security in any of the administrative divisions of Ukraine (regions, cities, districts and townships)
- Organization of resistance and (or) guerrilla groups – in case of territory being captured by the enemy
- Providing search and rescue and disaster response and mitigation during cases of peacetime natural and man-made disasters in support of other uniformed organizations

== Structure ==
Ukraine's territorial lands is divided into defense zones according to upper-level administrative units (regions, cities of special status, and Autonomous Republic of Crimea), which in turn are subordinate to the relevant operational command of the Armed Forces of Ukraine in whose area of responsibility these administrative units belong.

The Territorial Defence Forces comprise the Command of the Territorial Defence Forces, regional military command bodies, brigades and battalions. Their units have developed beyond a light-infantry role to include mechanized groups, aerial reconnaissance units and mortar teams. The force also operates training centres that provide instruction for personnel at different levels of command.

=== International Legion ===
As a former subdivision of the TDFU, the International Legion of Territorial Defense was organized as an operational division with brigades/regiments or independent battalions, structured in like manner as the territorial battalions mentioned above. Around 2023, the International Legion was split into two, with majority reassigned to the Ukrainian Ground Forces and the rest moved to the Main Directorate of Intelligence.

== Units ==
=== Operational Command West ===
As of 2024 the structure is as follows:

- 1st Territorial Defense Brigade (Kyiv)
- 101st Transcarpathian Defense Brigade (Zakarpattia Oblast)
- 102nd Ivano-Frankivsk Defense Brigade (Ivano-Frankivsk Oblast)
- 103rd Lviv Defense Brigade (Lviv Oblast)
- 104th Rivne Defense Brigade (Rivne Oblast)
- 105th Ternopil Defense Brigade (Ternopil Oblast)
- 106th Khmelnytskyi Defense Brigade (Khmelnytskyi Oblast)
- 107th Chernivtsi Defense Brigade (Chernivtsi Oblast)
- 2nd Volyn Infantry Battalion (Volyn Oblast)
- 5th Zakarpattia Infantry Battalion (Zakarpattia Oblast)
- 7th Ivano-Frankivsk Battalion (Ivano-Frankivsk Oblast)
- 10th Lviv Infantry Battalion (Lviv Oblast)
- 14th Rivne Infantry Battalion (Rivne Oblast)
- 16th Ternopil Infantry Battalion (Ternopil Oblast)
- 19th Khmelnytskyi Battalion (Khmelnytskyi Oblast)
- 21st Chernivtsi Infantry Battalion (Chernivtsi Oblast)
- 1226th Engineering Battalion

=== Operational Command North ===
- 112th Kyiv City Defense Brigade (Kyiv)
- 114th Kyiv Oblast Defense Brigade (Kyiv Oblast)
- 115th Zhytomyr Defense Brigade (Zhytomyr Oblast)
- 116th Poltava Defense Brigade (Poltava Oblast)
- 117th Sumy Defense Brigade (Sumy Oblast)
- 118th Cherkasy Defense Brigade (Cherkasy Oblast)
- 119th Chernihiv Defense Brigade (Chernihiv Oblast)
- 241st Kyiv City Defense Brigade (Kyiv)
- 411th Unmanned Systems Regiment
- 4th Zhytomyr Infantry Battalion (Zhytomyr Oblast)
- 8th Kyiv Region Infantry Battalion (Kyiv Region)
- 13th Poltava Infantry Battalion (Poltava Oblast)
- 15th Sumy Infantry Battalion (Sumy Oblast)
- 20th Cherkasy Infantry Battalion (Cherkasy Oblast)
- 22nd Chernihiv Infantry Battalion (Chernihiv Oblast)
- 180th Training Battalion (Chernihiv Oblast)
- Kyiv Infantry Battalion (Kyiv)

=== Operational Command South ===
- 120th Vinnytsia Defense Brigade (Vinnytsia Oblast)
- 121st Kirovohrad Defense Brigade (Kirovohrad Oblast)
- 122nd Odesa Defense Brigade (Odesa Oblast)
- 123rd Mykolaiv Defense Brigade (Mykolaiv Oblast)
- 1st Vinnytsia Infantry Battalion (Vinnytsia Oblast)
- 9th Kirovohrad Infantry Battalion (Kirovohrad Oblast)
- 12th Odesa Infantry Battalion (Odesa Oblast)
- 11th Mykolaiv Infantry Battalion (Mykolaiv Oblast)
- 18th Kherson City Infantry Battalion (Kherson Oblast)
- 535th Information-Telecommunications Node

=== Operational Command East ===
- 108th Dnipro Defense Brigade (Dnipropetrovsk Oblast)
- 109th Donetsk Defense Brigade (Donetsk Oblast)
- 110th Zaporizhia Defense Brigade (Zaporizhzhia)
- 111th Luhansk Defense Brigade (Luhansk Oblast)
- 113th Kharkiv Defense Brigade (Kharkiv Oblast)
- 3rd Dnipro Infantry Battalion (Dnipro Oblast)
- 6th Infantry Battalion (Ternopil Oblast)
- 17th Kharkiv Infantry Battalion (Kharkiv Oblast)
- 105th Luhansk Infantry Battalion (Luhansk Oblast)
- 152nd Training Center (Dnipro, Dnipro Oblast)
- Guard Battalion
- Territorial Defense Battalion “East”

=== Formations transferred to the Armed Forces ===
- 100th Volyn Defense Brigade (Volyn Oblast)
  - Transferred to Ukrainian Ground Forces in March 2024
- 124th Kherson Defense Brigade (Kherson Oblast)
  - Transferred to Ukrainian Marine Corps in June 2024
- 125th Lviv City Defense Brigade (Lviv)
  - Transferred to Ukrainian Ground Forces in February 2024
- 126th Odesa City Defense Brigade (Odesa)
  - Transferred to Ukrainian Marine Corps in April 2024
- 127th Kharkiv City Defense Brigade (Kharkiv)
  - Transferred to Ukrainian Ground Forces in July 2024
- 128th Dnipro City Defense Brigade (Dnipro)
  - Transferred to Ukrainian Ground Forces in February 2024
- 129th Kryvyi Rih Defense Brigade (Dnipropetrovsk Oblast)
  - Transferred to Ukrainian Ground Forces in July 2024

== Organisation ==
Territorial defense throughout Ukraine is organized by the General Staff of the Armed Forces of Ukraine, or regional governments in the relevant areas, within their powers. Direct supervision of state territorial defense is done by the head of the General Staff, with the Commander of the Armed Forces assuming overall supervision through the General Staff and the office of the Commander of the TDF.

Because of their territorial defense tasks the Territorial Defense Forces are involved in the Armed Forces of Ukraine and other military formations formed in accordance with the Constitution and laws of Ukraine, including law enforcement forces, units of the State Special Transport Service, State Special Communications Service of Ukraine and the relevant bodies and offices of the government of the republic.

Regional military commissariats form separate rifle battalions. District (city) military commissariats form defense units in an amount of 2 to 5 units, depending on the assigned tasks. Regional and district military commissariats have a staff defence company, involved in the task of territorial defense (TD).

All units are equipped reservists and military service obligatories. Preparation of the units of TD held within educational meeting of military service (with practical appeal) and the activities carried out between these.

Units of the ILTD were made up of veterans of foreign armed forces and organized in like manner as the rest of the TDF.

== Commanders ==
- Yuriy Halushkin (1 Jan 2022 – 15 May 2022)
- Ihor Tantsyura (15 May 2022 – 9 October 2023)
- Anatoliy Barhylevych (9 October 2023 – 9 February 2024)
- Ihor Plakhuta (11 February 2024 – present)

== See also ==
- International Legion of Territorial Defense of Ukraine
- Ukrainian volunteer battalions
- Sarah Ashton-Cirillo, a former TDF spokesperson
