= 105th Territorial Defense Brigade =

Ukrainian Territorial Defense Forces unit

- Ukrainian: 105-та окрема бригада територіальної оборони
- Active: 27 June 2018 – present
- Country: Ukraine
- Branch: Armed Forces of Ukraine
- Type: Military reserve force
- Role: Light infantry
- Part of: Territorial Defense Forces
- Garrison/HQ: Ternopil Oblast; MUN А7033

Commanders
- Current commander: Colonel Yevhen Fomenko

Insignia
- Flag

The 105th Territorial Defense Brigade (Ukrainian: 105-та окрема бригада територіальної оборони) is a military formation of the Territorial Defense Forces of Ukraine in Ternopil Oblast. It is part of Operational Command West.

== History ==
=== Formation ===
The brigade was formed on 27 June 2018 in Ternopil Oblast. On 2 August in Borshchiv, over 200 reservists were gathered for training. In November a recruitment drive was organized to fill the brigade's ranks. In February and March 2019 the brigade held readiness exercises.

=== Russo-Ukrainian War ===
==== Russian invasion of Ukraine ====
On 4 March, Ternopil Oblast governor Volodymyr Trush announced that the brigade was at its full strength. Its soldiers were tasked with defense of critical infrastructure, manning roadblocks and helping postal workers deliver pensions.

In early March 2022, the 105th Brigade was ordered to form a consolidated battalion to be deployed into combat operations. It was initially planned that one company would be sent from each of the brigade's 80th, 82nd, 83rd, and 85th Battalions. Units of the 105th Brigade's consolidated battalion began deploying by 11 March.

In mid-March, the 105th Brigade's consolidated battalion was positioned on the border between the Poltava Oblast and the Sumy Oblast in order to repel a potential Russian offensive in the area of Romny. The battalion manned checkpoints, guarded bridges, and patrolled villages, but did not engage in combat with Russian forces. By the end of April, units of this battalion were redeployed to Udy in the Kharkiv Oblast in order to repel a potential Russian offensive from the village of Kozacha Lopan. In mid-May, the consolidated battalion was disbanded, and its constituent units were returned to the territorial defense battalions from which they had been taken.

In April 2022, units of the 105th Brigade were deployed to the combat zone in the Kharkiv Oblast, including near Barvinkove. Starting on 15 April, the brigade's 83rd Battalion held a 20 kilometres (12 mi) defensive line from the western outskirts of Barvinkove to the villages of Chervona Zoria and Semenivka, with its command post in the village of Afrykanivka.

At the end of June 2022, the brigade's 83rd Battalion was subordinated to the 95th Air Assault Brigade, and was deployed to a defensive line in the Donetsk Oblast passing through the villages of Mazanivka, Krasnopillia and Dolyna; its command headquarters were in the village of Novomykolaiivka.

In late August and early September 2022, the 83rd Battalion advanced 10 kilometers from its positions on this defensive line in the direction of Izium, as part of a major Ukrainian offensive. It has been reported that the brigade's 83rd Battalion operated in the villages of Velyka Komyshuvakha, Topolske, and Kam'yanka.

During the same offensive, on 9 September, the brigade's 80th Battalion, under the command of the Lyman operational-tactical group, was assigned to take part in an operation to capture the villages of Bilohorivka in the Luhansk Oblast and Spirne in the Donetsk Oblast, in order to improve the tactical situation on the Siversk front, prevent future Russian offensives on Sloviansk and Kramatorsk, and create conditions for a Ukrainian offensive on Lysychansk. In cooperation with the 54th Mechanized Brigade, a unit of the 80th Battalion retook the village of Spirne.

In early October 2022, the 83rd Battalion was deployed to defend the village of Masiutivka in the Kharkiv Oblast, with its headquarters located in Dvorichna. The battalion took up positions southeast of Masiutivka near a railway line. At the end of the month, the battalion was subordinated to the 14th Mechanized Brigade.

Units of the brigade were stationed at the Kupiansk direction in the Kharkiv Oblast between October 2022 and March–April 2023. The brigade's 83rd Battalion held the defense of the Oskil River near the villages of Masiutivka, Kindrashivka, and Tyshenivka between fall 2022 and 2025.

== Structure ==
As of 2022 the brigade's structure is as follows:

- Headquarters
- 80th Territorial Defense Battalion (Bilobozhnytsia) MUN А7167
- 82nd Territorial Defense Battalion (Ternopil Raion) MUN А7169
- 83rd Territorial Defense Battalion (Ternopil) MUN А7170
- 85th Territorial Defense Battalion (Kremenets) MUN А7172
- Automobile Company
- Counter-Sabotage Company
- Logistics Company
- Communication Company
- Anti-Aircraft Platoon
- Commandant's Company
- Reconnaissance Company
- Engineering Company
- Medical Company
- Mortar Battery

== Commanders ==
- Colonel Oleh Didichenko 2018 - 2019
- Colonel Yevhen Fomenko 10 October 2022 - present

== See also ==
- Territorial Defense Forces of the Armed Forces of Ukraine
