= Hlyboka =

Rural locality in Chernivtsi Oblast, Ukraine

Hlyboka Глибока Hliboka • Adâncata
- Rural settlement
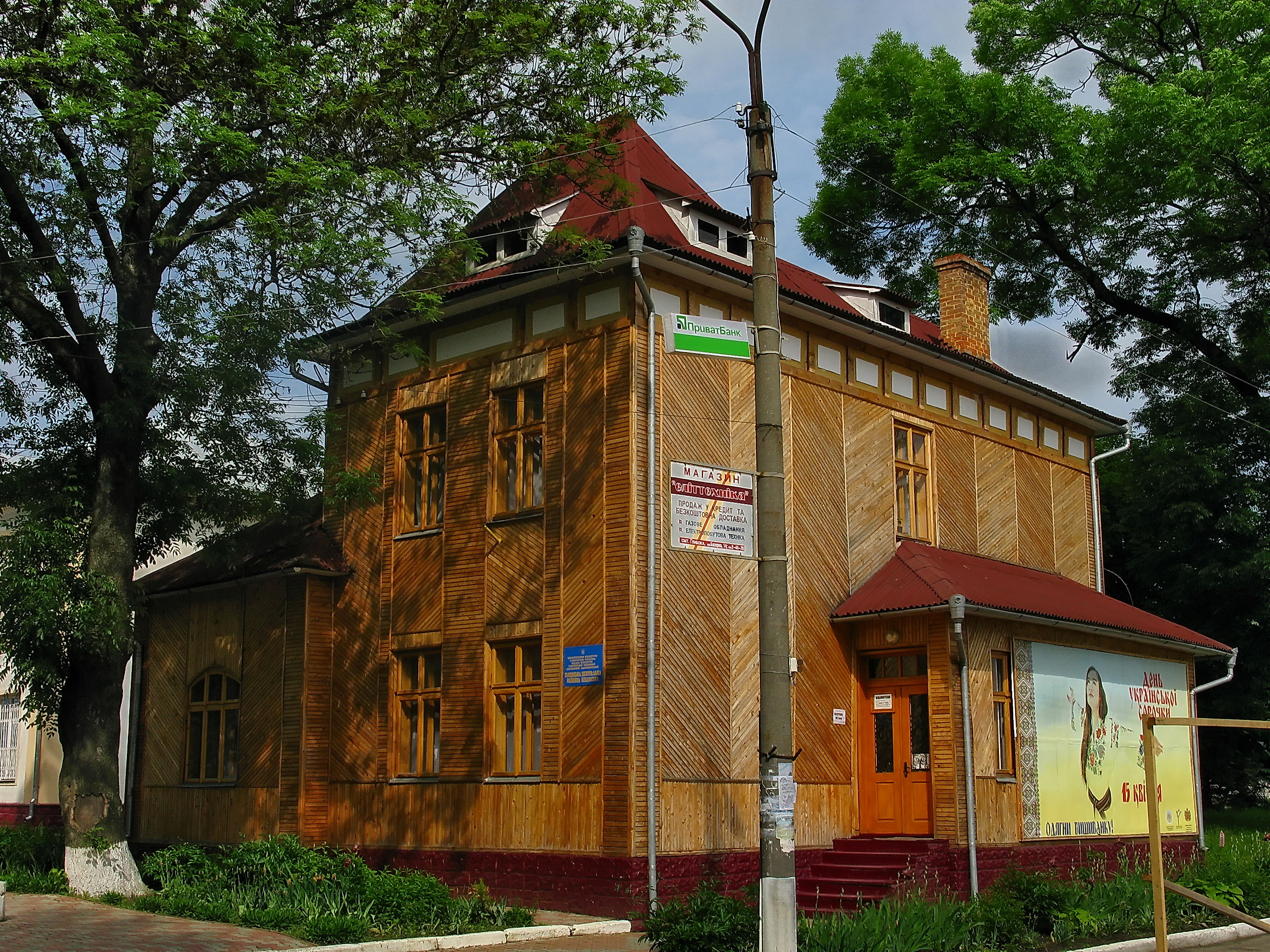
- Traditional Folk Architecture

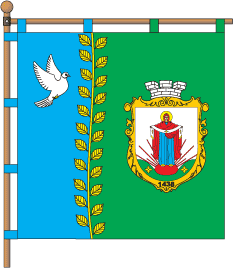
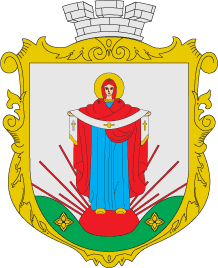
- Flag Coat of arms
- Interactive map of Hlyboka
- Location of Hlyboka Hlyboka (Ukraine)
- Coordinates: 48°5′N 25°56′E
- Country: Ukraine
- Oblast: Chernivtsi Oblast
- Raion: Chernivtsi Raion
- Established: 1438
- Urban Status: 1956

Government
  - Mayor: Hryhoriy Vanzuryak

Area
  - Total: 7.22 km^{2} (2.79 sq mi)
- Elevation: 345 m (1,132 ft)

Population (2022)
  - Total: 9,226
  - Density: 1,280/km^{2} (3,310/sq mi)
- Time zone: UTC+2 (EET)
  - Summer (DST): UTC+3 (EEST)
- Postal code: 60400—60406
- Area code: +380 3734

Hlyboka (Ukrainian: Глибока; German and Polish: Hliboka; Romanian: Adâncata) is a rural settlement in Chernivtsi Raion, Chernivtsi Oblast, western Ukraine. It hosts the administration of Hlyboka settlement hromada, one of the hromadas of Ukraine. Population: 9,226 (2022 estimate).

== Geography ==
Hlyboka is located in the region of Bukovinian Ciscarpathia.

== History ==
Arhcaeological finds from the times of Trypillia, Hallstatt, Roman Empire and Kyivan Rus have been discovered in the area by expeditions of Josef Szombathy (1893-1894) and Cz. Ambrożewicz.

Hlyboka is mentioned for the first time in 1438.

Before World War II, large parts of Hlyboka's land were owned by Polish noble families: until 1892, Prince Adam Sapieha, then Bronislaw Skibniewski (1830–1904), and later by his son Aleksander Skibniewski (1868–1942).

Hlyboka received urban-type settlement status in 1956.

Until 18 July 2020, Hlyboka served as the administrative center of Hlyboka Raion. The raion was abolished in July 2020 as part of the administrative reform of Ukraine, which reduced the number of raions of Chernivtsi Oblast to three. The area of Hlyboka Raion was merged into Chernivtsi Raion.

On 26 January 2024, a new law entered into force, abolishing the status of urban-type settlement in Ukraine, and Hlyboka became a rural settlement.

== Demographics ==
In 2001, 84.64% of the 9,124 inhabitants spoke Ukrainian as their native language (7,723 people), while 12.16% spoke Romanian, or 1,109 people (11.72% called it Romanian, or 1069 people, and 0.44% called it "Moldovan", or 40 people), and 2.97% spoke Russian, or 271 people. In 1989, out of a population of mostly Ukrainian 9,352 inhabitants, 1,698 declared that they were ethnic Romanians (18.86%) and 183 declared that they were ethnic Moldovans (1.96%). Most of the population with a Moldovan identity switched their declared census identities from Moldovan and Moldovan-speaking to Romanian and Romanian-speaking between the 1989 and 2001 censuses. In 1992-1993, in the two Ukrainian-language schools in the locality, there were 1,493 students; out of them, 264 had a Romanian ethnic identity (17.68%) and 14 had a Moldovan ethnic identity (0.94%).

According to the 2001 Ukrainian census, in the Hlyboka settlement community, which was created in 2020 and had a population of 18,897 according to the census, and whose capital was Hlyboka, 70.39% of the inhabitants spoke Ukrainian as their native language, or 13,301 people, while 27.48%, or 5,193 people, spoke Romanian (including 5,117 who called it Romanian, or 27.08%, and 76 called it "Moldovan", or 0.4%), and 1.91%, or 271 people, spoke Russian.

== Twin towns and sister cities ==
Hlyboka is twinned with:

- Piatra Neamț, Romania

== Notable people ==
- Valerii Krasnian (1971–2022), Ukrainian volunteer, cyborg, and serviceman who was one of the symbols of the fight for Donetsk airport.

== Hlyboka on old photographs ==
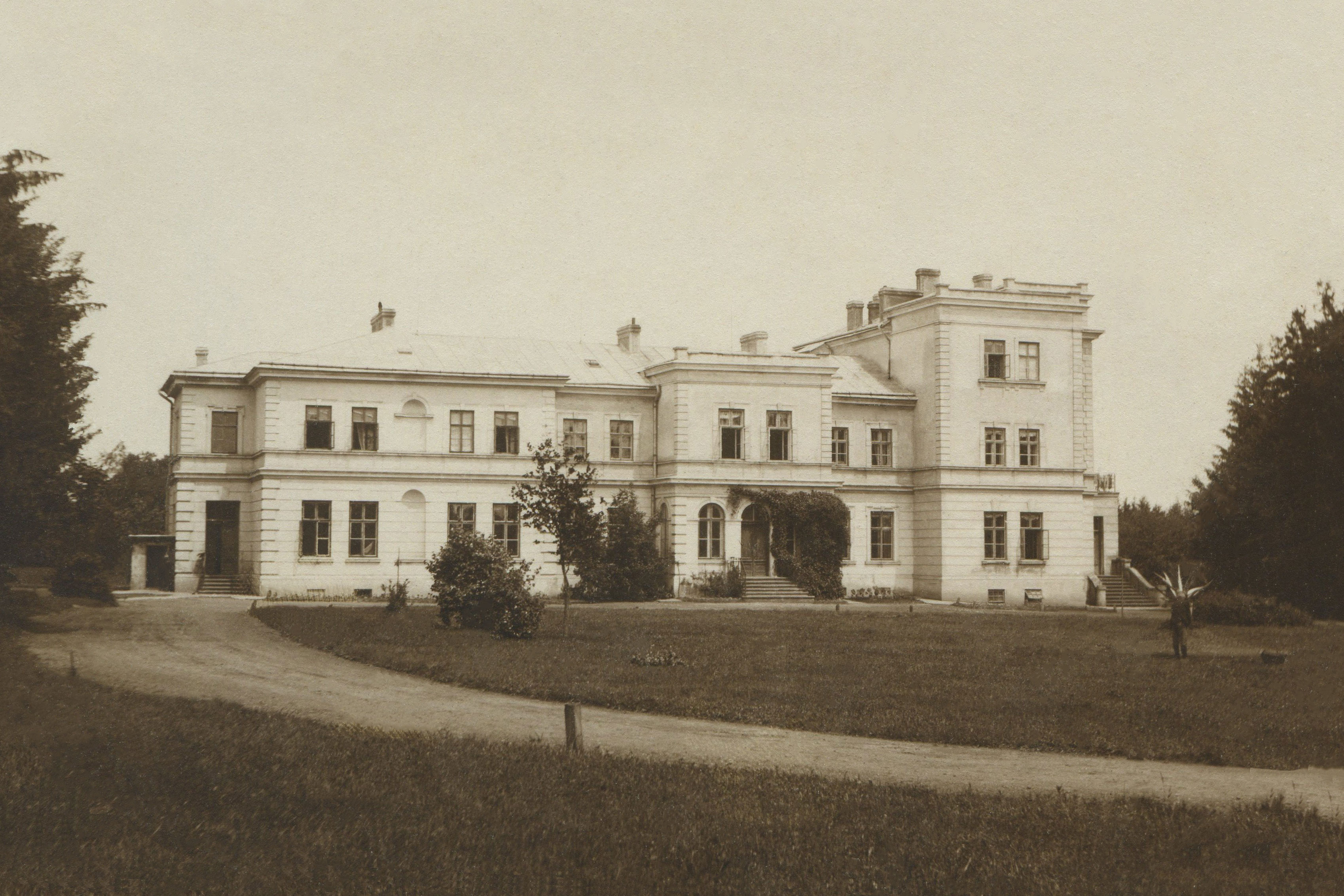
Skibniewski Palace in 1925

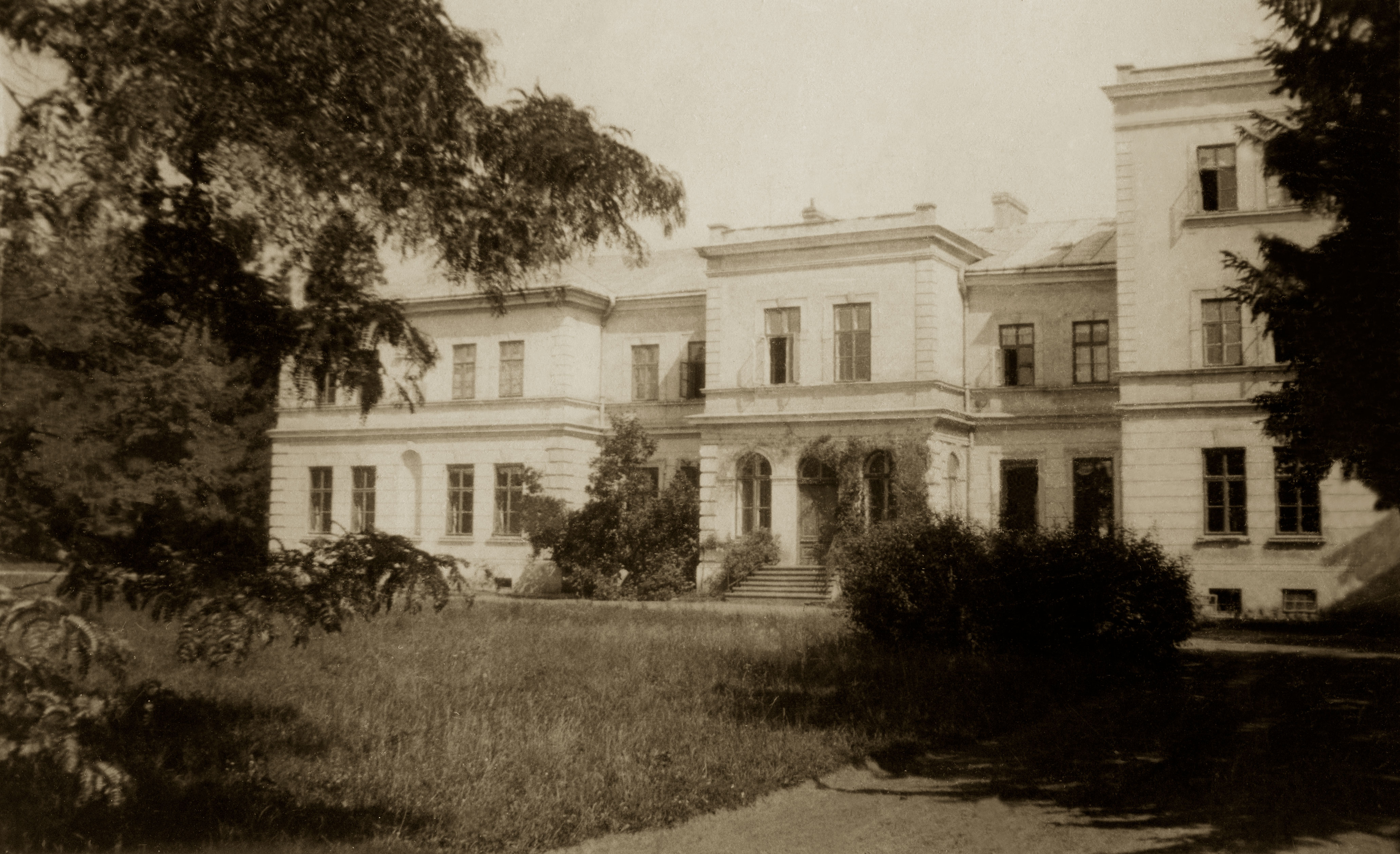
Front

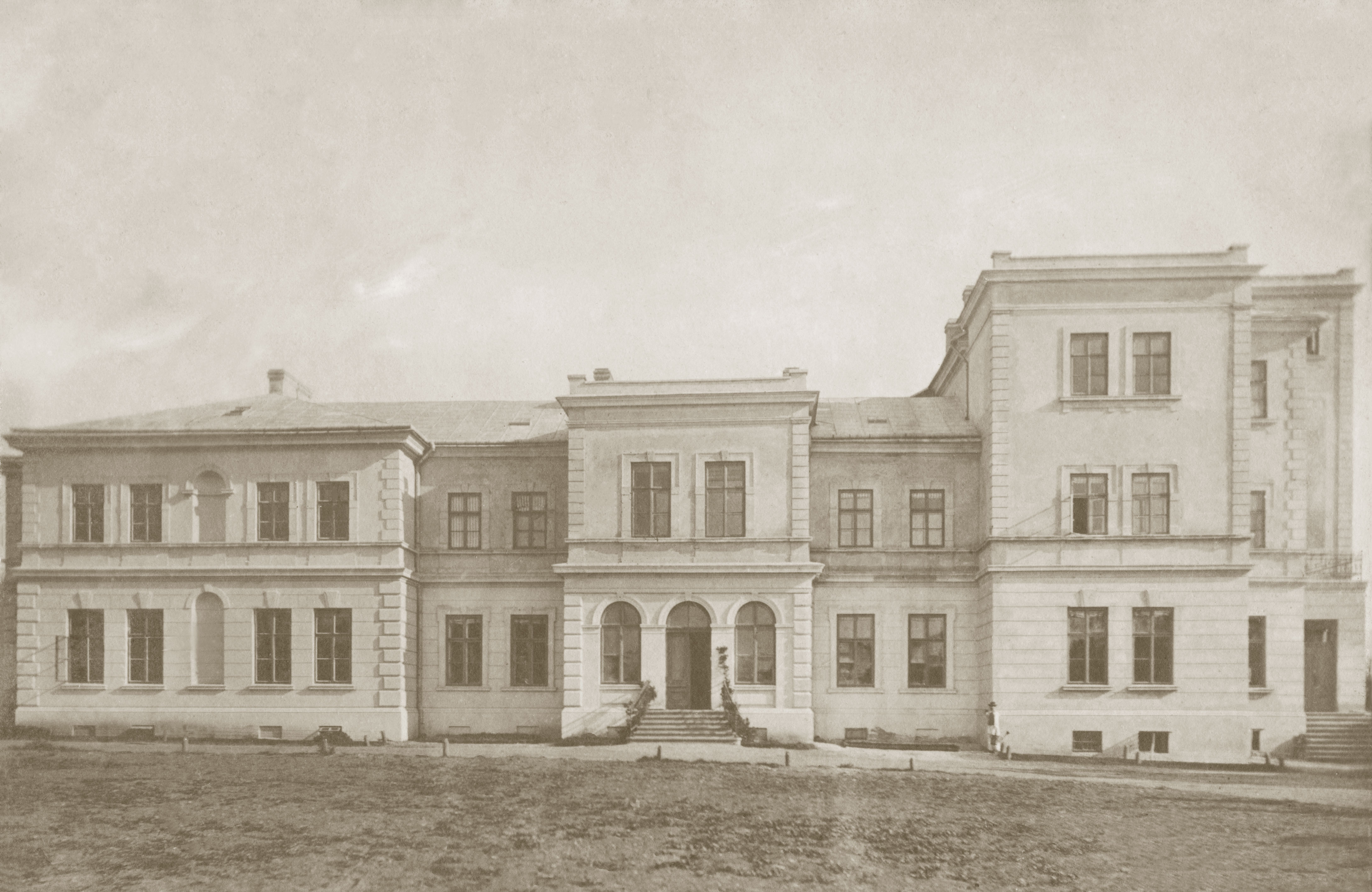
Front

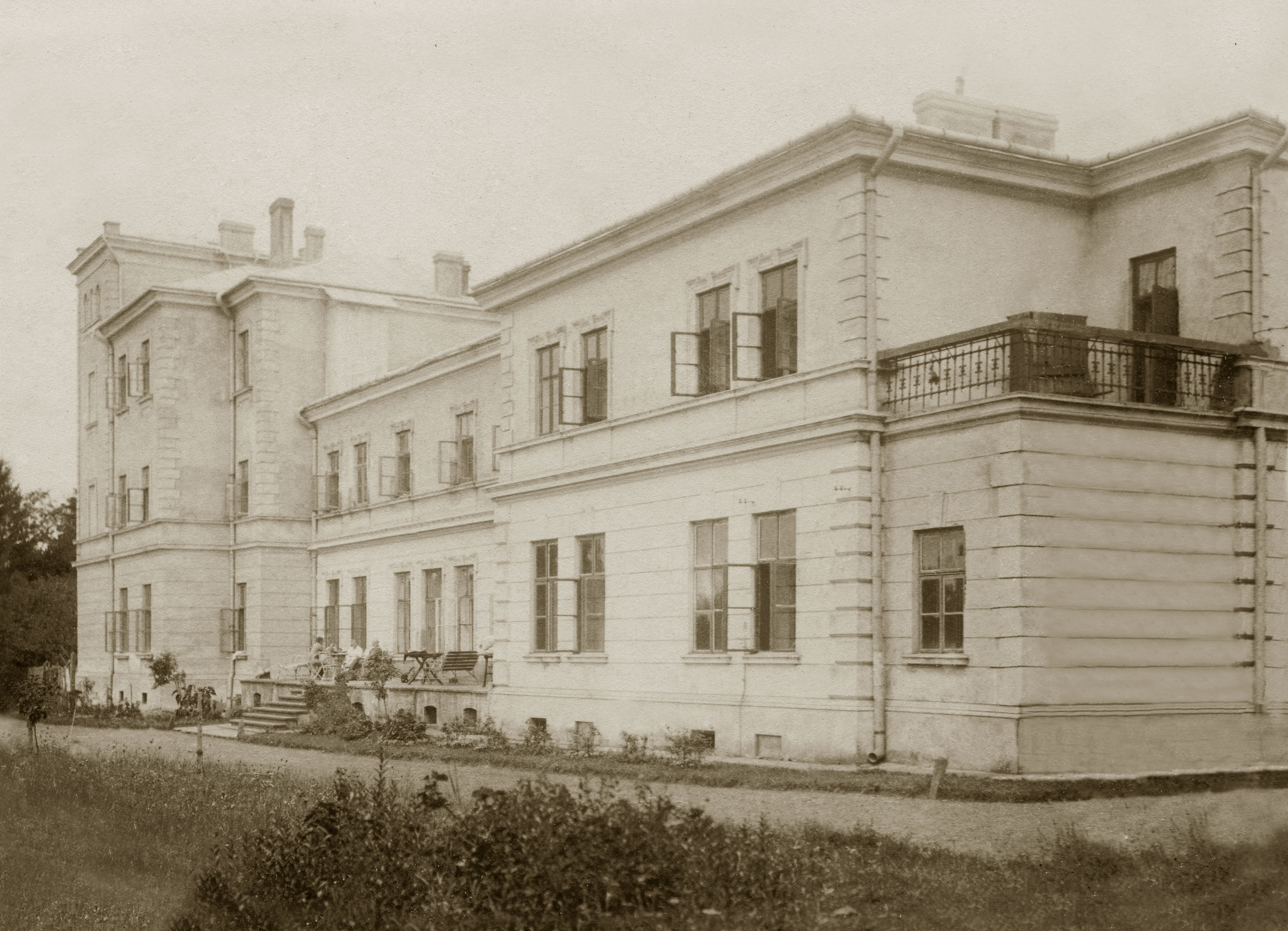
View from the gardens

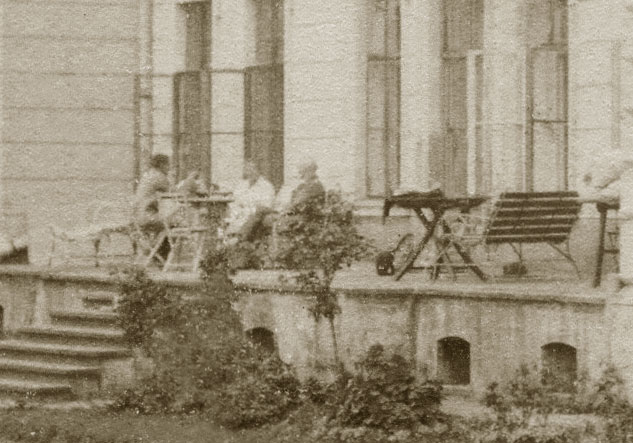
Fragment
