= Serhii Korol =

Ukrainian soldier (1970–2023)

- Сергій Володимирович Король
- Born: 1 October 1970; Ternopil, Ukrainian SSR
- Died: 24 February 2023 (aged 52) near the village of Masiutivka, Kharkiv Oblast
- Military career
- Allegiance: Ukraine
- Branch: Ukrainian Ground Forces
- Rank: Captain
- Nickname: Makhno
- Unit: 105th Territorial Defense Brigade
- Conflicts: Russo-Ukrainian War; Russian invasion of Ukraine †
- Awards: Order of the Gold Star (posthumously)

Serhii Korol (Ukrainian: Сергій Володимирович Король; October 1, 1970, Ternopil — February 24, 2023, near the village of Masiutivka, Kharkiv Oblast) was a Ukrainian soldier, captain of the 105th Territorial Defense Brigade of the Armed Forces of Ukraine, a participant of the Russian-Ukrainian war. Hero of Ukraine (2023).

== Biography ==
Serhii Korol was born on October 1, 1970, in Ternopil.

In the 1990s, he began his service in the National Guard of Ukraine. Later he was an entrepreneur.

In 2014, as a volunteer, he took part in the war in Donbas.

With the beginning of the full-scale Russian invasion of Ukraine, he returned to the frontline. He was the commander of the 2nd company of the 83rd battalion of the 105th Territorial Defense Brigade. He died on February 24, 2023, near the village of Masiutivka, Kharkiv region.

He was buried on February 27, 2023, in the Alley of Heroes of the Mykulynets Cemetery in Ternopil.

== Family ==
He is survived by his father and sister.

== Awards ==
- the title of Hero of Ukraine with the Order of the Golden Star (8 July 2023, posthumously) – for personal courage and heroism in the defence of state sovereignty and territorial integrity of Ukraine, selfless service to the Ukrainian people;
- Honorary Citizen of the City of Ternopil (3 March 2023, posthumously) – for his significant personal contribution to the establishment of Ukrainian statehood and personal courage and heroism in the defence of the state sovereignty and territorial integrity of Ukraine.
