= 107th Territorial Defense Brigade =

Ukrainian Territorial Defense Forces unit

- Ukrainian: 107-та окрема бригада територіальної оборони
- Active: September 2018 – present
- Country: Ukraine
- Branch: Armed Forces of Ukraine
- Type: Military reserve force
- Role: Light infantry
- Part of: Territorial Defense Forces; Operational Command West
- Garrison/HQ: Chernivtsi Oblast; MUN А7035
- Engagements: Russian invasion of Ukraine: 2022 Kharkiv counteroffensive

Commanders
- Current commander: Lieutenant Colonel Igor Isachenko

Insignia
- Flag

The 107th Territorial Defense Brigade (Ukrainian: 107-та окрема бригада територіальної оборони) is a military formation of the Territorial Defense Forces of Ukraine in Chernivtsi Oblast. It is part of Operational Command West.

== History ==
=== Formation ===
On 1 March 2018, Chernivtsi Oblast's chief enlistment officer, Volodymyr Shvediuk, announced that the brigade would be formed. He said 6 battalions would be created in the main raions, including 1 battalion in Chernivtsi.

=== Russo-Ukrainian War ===
Russian invasion of Ukraine

On 28 February 2022, the Chernivtsi City Council announced that all units of the brigade were fully staffed and that recruitment had been suspended.

On 13 April 2022, Chernihiv Oblast officials announced that soldiers from the brigade had captured a Russian tank. Brigade commander Lieutenant Colonel Andriy Tsisak said that after repairs, the tank would be operated by the brigade's 94th Battalion.

The brigade's 93rd Battalion, the territorial defense of the Vyzhnytsia Raion, was deployed to the front line in Kharkiv Oblast by late June 2022. The battalion captured the village of Velyka Komyshuvakha in Kharkiv Oblast on 10 September, amid a Ukrainian counteroffensive in the region.

In April 2023, the brigade's 97th Battalion was positioned on the Russia-Ukraine border at the village of Budarky in the Kharkiv Oblast.

== Structure ==
As of 2022 the brigade's structure is as follows:

- Headquarters
- 92nd Territorial Defense Battalion (Chernivtsi) MUN А7185
- 93rd Territorial Defense Battalion (Vyzhnytsia) MUN А7186
- 94th Territorial Defense Battalion (Storozhynets) MUN А7187
- 95th Territorial Defense Battalion (Kitsman) MUN А7188
- 96th Territorial Defense Battalion (Novoselytsia) MUN А7219
- 97th Territorial Defense Battalion (Sokyriany) MUN А7220
- Counter-Sabotage Company
- Engineering Company
- Communication Company
- Logistics Company
- Mortar Battery

== Commanders ==
- Colonel Andrii Tsisak: August 2021-2024

== See also ==
- Territorial Defense Forces of the Armed Forces of Ukraine
