= Velyka Komyshuvakha =

Rural locality in Kharkiv Oblast, Ukraine

Coordinates: 49°06′47″N 36°59′27″E

Velyka Komyshuvakha Велика Комишуваха
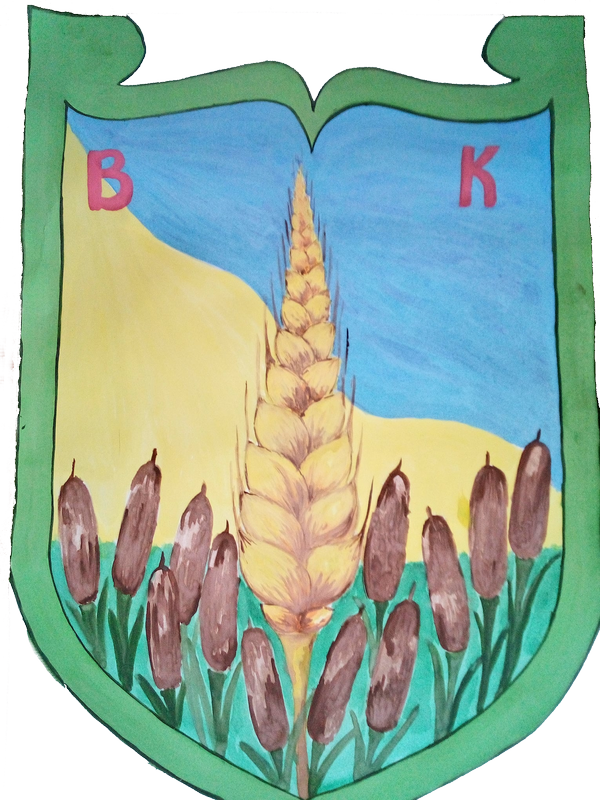
- Coat of arms
- Interactive map of Velyka Komyshuvakha
- Country: Ukraine
- Oblast: Kharkiv Oblast
- Raion: Izium Raion
- Founded: 1760

Population
  - Total: 561

Velyka Komyshuvakha is a village (selo) of Ukraine, in Izium Raion, Kharkiv Oblast. Velyka Komyshuvakha belongs to Barvinkove urban hromada, one of the hromadas of Ukraine. It has a population of 561.

== History ==
During the Holodomor, 389 residents of the village died.

On June 12, 2020, according to the Order of the Cabinet of Ministers of Ukraine No. 725-r "On Determining Administrative Centers and Approval of Territories of Territorial Communities of Kharkiv Region," it became part of the Barvinkivska urban community.

Until 18 July 2020, Velyka Komyshuvakha belonged to Barvinkove Raion. The raion was abolished in July 2020 as part of the administrative reform of Ukraine, which reduced the number of raions of Kharkiv Oblast to seven. The area of Barvinkove Raion was merged into Izium Raion.

Velyka Komyshuvakha was occupied by Russian forces for over four months in 2022, including by units of the 2nd Guards Motor Rifle Division. It was recaptured by the 93rd Battalion of Ukraine's 107th Brigade on 10 September 2022, amid a Ukrainian counteroffensive in the Kharkiv Oblast. At the time that it was recaptured, almost every building in the village had been destroyed. By 2023, its population had decreased from a pre-war figure of about 500 to around only 70.
