= Ihor Tantsyura =

Ukrainian military commander

- Ігор Іванович Танцюра
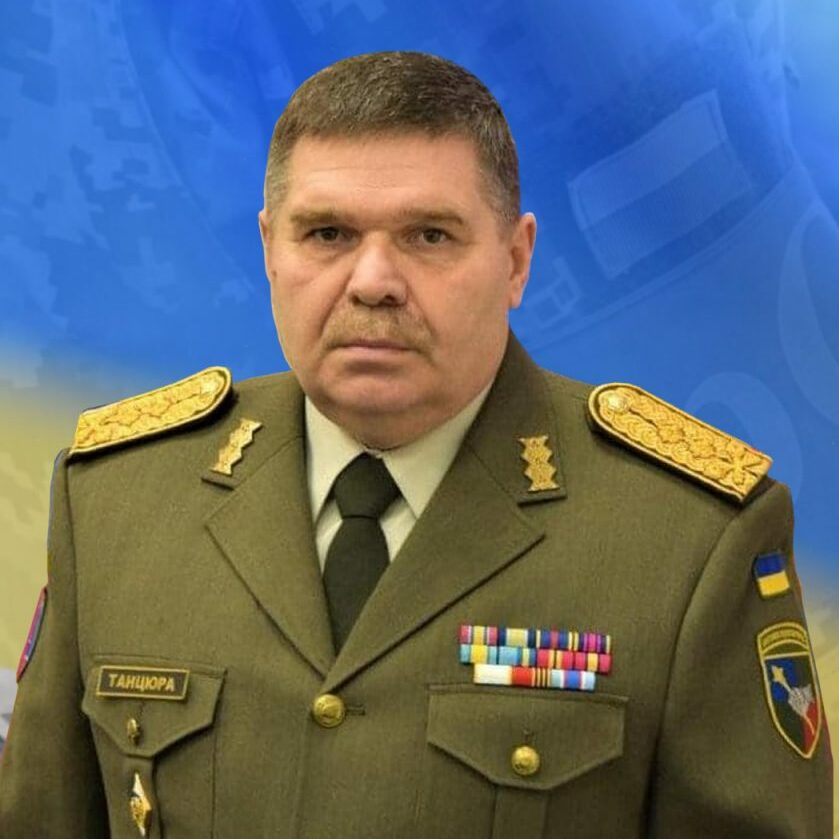
- Born: Ihor Ivanovych Tantsyura; April 26, 1967 (age 59)
- Military career
- Allegiance: Soviet Union; Ukraine
- Branch: Ukrainian Ground Forces
- Rank: Major general
- Commands: Territorial Defense Forces
- Conflicts: Russo-Ukrainian War; Russian Invasion of Ukraine
- Awards: Order of Bohdan Khmelnytsky 3d class

Ihor Ivanovych Tantsyura (Ukrainian: Ігор Іванович Танцюра; born April 26, 1967) is a Ukrainian general and was the commander of the Territorial Defense Forces from 15 May 2022 until 9 October 2023.

== Biography ==
As of 2013, head of the 169th training center of the Ground Forces of the Armed Forces of Ukraine.

In 2019, Chief of Staff - First Deputy Commander of the Joint Forces Operation. In 2022, Chief of Staff and Deputy Commander of the Ground Forces of the Armed Forces of Ukraine. On May 15, 2022, he was appointed Commander of the Territorial Defense Forces of the Armed Forces of Ukraine. He was dismissed by Ukrainian President Volodymyr Zelenskyy on 9 October 2023.

== Awards ==
- Order of Bohdan Khmelnytsky 3d class (April 11, 2022).
