= 2022 Kharkiv counteroffensive =

2022 military operation during the Russo-Ukrainian war

- Part of the Eastern front of the Russo-Ukrainian war
- Map of major attacks during the counteroffensive
Date	3 September – October 2022
Location	Eastern Ukraine (Kharkiv Oblast, Donetsk Oblast, and Luhansk Oblast)
Result	Ukrainian victory

Belligerents
Ukraine	Russia: Donetsk PR; Luhansk PR

Commanders and leaders
Valerii Zaluzhnyi; Oleksandr Syrskyi	Alexander Lapin

Strength
8 times larger than the strength of Russian troops (first phase, per Ganchev)	~9,000 troops in ~12 battalion tactical groups (August 2022, at Izium, per Syrskyi); 10,000 troops (9 Sept., per Axe); 5,500 troops (30 Sept., per Berezovets, at Lyman)

Casualties and losses
Unknown	11th Army Corps: 200 vehicles (18 Sept., per Ukrainian military); ~1,500 killed (at Lyman, per Ukrainian officer)

On 6 September 2022, the Armed Forces of Ukraine launched a major counteroffensive (Note: Sometimes called the Kharkiv counteroffensive or, in Ukrainian sources, the Slobozhanshchyna counteroffensive (Ukrainian: Слобожанський контрнаступ, romanized: Slobozhanskyi kontrnastup)) against the Russian military during the Russo-Ukrainian war. As Ukraine announced the start of the Kherson counteroffensive in southern Ukraine in late August, Ukrainian forces also began a second counteroffensive in early September in Kharkiv Oblast, in eastern Ukraine.

As the Ukrainian military broke through Russian defensive lines, it recaptured multiple cities in a matter of days. On 7 September, the second day of the counteroffensive, the Ukrainian military advanced over 20 kilometres (12 mi) into Russian-held territory. The next day, Ukraine recaptured Balakliia and Shevchenkove as Russian forces withdrew and fled. On the 9th, Russia began announcing for evacuations in nearby areas as the Ukrainian military continued its advance. The next day, Ukraine retook the key cities of Izium and Kupiansk, securing access to the Oskil River. By the 11th, Ukraine successfully advanced up to 70 kilometres (43 mi) from the pre-counteroffensive front line. In turn, Russia's defence ministry announced the withdrawal of all forces west of the Oskil.

The pace of the counteroffensive then began to slow, but continued until early October. By 13 September, the Ukrainian military continued advancing and crossed the Oskil River. Fighting continued over the next two weeks as Ukraine advanced and recaptured smaller villages. By 26 September, Ukraine retook Kupiansk-Vuzlovyi on the east of the Oskil, securing its presence on both sides of the river. By late September, Ukraine began encircling the city of Lyman before capturing it on 1 October.

During the offensive, Ukraine retook over 500 settlements and 12,000 square kilometers of territory in the Kharkiv region. This blitzkrieg disrupted Russian supply lines and significantly hindered its operations in the war. It also served as a morale boost for Ukraine, as it continued to receive Western military aid during the war.

== Background ==
During the early days of the Russian invasion of Ukraine, Russian forces captured much of eastern Kharkiv Oblast, including the towns of Kupiansk, Shevchenkove, and Balakliia: Shevchenkove came under Russian occupation on 26 February 2022, Kupiansk on 27 February, and Balakliia on 2 March. According to Viktor Aleksieiev of Holovne v Ukraiini, Russian operations in this region were initially of an auxiliary nature: to cut off Kharkiv from the south and southeast, separating it from the most combat-ready Ukrainian units in the Donbas and ensuring its capture by Russian forces advancing from its north. After abandoning the plans to capture Kharkiv, Russian forces used Izium to attack the Donbas from the north.

From March to early May, most of the fighting in Kharkiv Oblast was concentrated in the cities of Kharkiv and Izium. In early April, Russian forces captured Izium, and Ukrainian forces successfully defended Kharkiv by early May. After that, the frontline began to stagnate as Russia and Ukraine focused their efforts on the cities of Sievierodonetsk, Lysychansk and the wider Donbas region. Russian troops began accumulating in Izium, as Russian command intended for it to serve as a base as part of a large operation to surround Ukrainian forces in the east; Syrskyi estimated that as many as 24 battalion tactical groups numbering about 18,000 troops were at one point based in the city and its surrounding area.

Throughout July and August 2022, Ukrainian and Russian media both amplified claims of a Ukrainian counteroffensive in Kherson Oblast. By August, the number of Russian battalions in Izium had decreased by at least one-half, amid a redeployment of Russian forces to Kherson. Ukraine's operation in the south finally culminated on 29 August 2022. The counteroffensive saw slow progress, with Ukrainian forces suffering heavy losses and facing a stiff Russian resistance. However, on 6 September, Ukrainian forces launched a surprise counteroffensive in eastern Kharkiv oblast, with fighting for Balakliia beginning on the first day.

Russian offensives in the first months of its invasion of Ukraine left large swathes of Kharkiv Oblast under Russian control, including the key logistical nodes of Izium, Kupiansk, Shevchenkove, and Balakliia. However, the majority of the oblast remained within Ukrainian control, including the city of Kharkiv, where the Russian military continuously bombarded with rockets, artillery, and cluster munitions until August.

Ukrainian forces held off Russian advances towards Kharkiv, then launched counteroffensives in March and May pushing the Russians from the outskirts of the city. By 6 June, the Russian bombardment of Kharkiv had killed 606 civilians and injured 1,248 according to Amnesty International.

The battle lines in Kharkiv Oblast remained largely static over the next few months as Ukrainian and Western military analysts believed Russia lacked the ground forces to renew its offensive. The Kharkiv death toll exceeded 1,000 by August.

By September 2022, Oleksandr Syrskyi, who had been in charge of the defense of Kyiv at the beginning of the invasion and later received the title of Hero of Ukraine for his service, was appointed to command the Ukrainian land forces in Kharkiv Oblast. The counteroffensive was performed under his command, and Syrskyi is considered to be its architect. Since spring 2022, Syrskyi had been considering the possibility of an offensive operation north of Balakliia and Izium which would threaten Russian forces in both cities with encirclement. In the summer, the Ukrainian General Staff called for its commanders to propose diversionary operations to draw Russian forces away from the defense of Kherson, and Syrskyi submitted his idea.

Syrskyi's plan called for a fast-paced advance that avoided direct attacks on towns and cities to avoid casualties. Just before the operation was launched, every attacking brigade was supplied with at least eight M777 howitzers.

== Prelude ==
After weeks of Ukrainian propaganda about an imminent counteroffensive in southern Ukraine, Russia redeployed thousands of troops to Kherson Oblast, leaving its remaining troops manning a "stretched and tired Russian front that spanned some 1,300km – roughly the distance from London to Prague."

The arrival of US-supplied HIMARS guided-rocket artillery enabled Ukrainian forces to strike up to 70 kilometres (43 mi) behind Russian lines, targeting Russian bases and ammunition depots as far back as Kupiansk and Kivsharivka in the weeks preceding the eastern counteroffensive. These strikes further weakened Russian logistics and morale. On 5 September, the Ukrainians claimed to have killed or wounded 100 Russian soldiers and destroyed two combat vehicles in a strike on Kupiansk.

On 29 August, Ukraine announced it would soon launch an offensive in the Kherson region of southern Ukraine. Ukrainian units attacked soon after, and Russia's attention shifted to its Kherson line. While the Kherson offensive might have been genuine, Western analysts view it as part of a ploy to divert Russian forces away from Kharkiv prior to Ukraine's much larger eastern counteroffensive. In any case, Russian forces in Kharkiv were left understrength and unprepared in the days preceding 6 September.

Russian authorities postponed annexation referendums in Russian-occupied Ukraine on 5 September 2022 due to security concerns.

== Counteroffensive ==
=== First phase (6–12 September 2022) ===
==== Initial advance ====
On 6 September 2022, Ukrainian forces launched a counteroffensive in the Kharkiv region, taking Russian forces by surprise. In a 10 September interview with the Guardian, Ukrainian special forces spokesman Taras Berezovets stated Russia "thought [the counteroffensive] would be in the south... then, instead of the south, the offensive happened where they least expected, and this caused them to panic and flee."

Elements of Ukraine's 25th Airborne Brigade began advancing just past 3:30 a.m. on 6 September, after several hours of Ukrainian artillery fire on Russian positions. Throughout the day, units of the 25th Brigade advanced at least 11 miles (18 km), reaching the village of Volokhiv Yar, located at a strategic road junction.

On 7 September, units of Ukraine's 112th Territorial Defense Brigade began storming Russian positions in the village of Mykolaiivka, thus launching the Ukrainian offensive out of the Chuhuiv Raion from which Shevchenkove would eventually be taken. Almost simultaneously, the 125th Battalion of the 113th Territorial Defense Brigade stormed the village of Vasylenkove 6 kilometres (3.7 mi) east of Mykolaiivka. No later than midday on 8 September, units of the 113th Brigade advanced east along a highway and reached Shevchenkove, linking up with Ukrainian forces which had advanced north from Balakliia.

Ukrainian troops recaptured some 400 square kilometres (150 sq mi) of territory during the first two days.

On 8 September, the 233rd Battalion of the 128th Territorial Defense Brigade took control of the village of Vovchyi Yar and defeated a group of Russian and LPR forces there.

By 9 September, Ukraine had broken through Russian lines, with the Ukrainian military saying that it had advanced nearly 50 kilometres (31 mi) and recaptured over 1,000 square kilometres (390 sq mi) of territory. This advance placed them approximately 44 kilometres (27 mi) northwest of Izium, the main Russian logistics base in the region, a rate of advancement largely unseen since Russia withdrew from Kyiv at the start of the war. The Washington Post described the fall of Izium on 10 September as a "stunning rout"; the Institute for the Study of War assessed that Ukrainian forces had captured approximately 2,500 square kilometres (970 sq mi) in the breakthrough.

One military expert said that it was the first time since World War II that whole Russian units had been lost in a single battle. Journalist Harald Stutte argued that the commander of the Ukrainian offensive, Valerii Zaluzhnyi, had achieved a "tactical masterstroke" during the operation, especially at Lyman. In contrast, the main Russian commander opposing the Ukrainian attack, Alexander Lapin, was criticized for his lacking performance.

==== Breakthrough ====
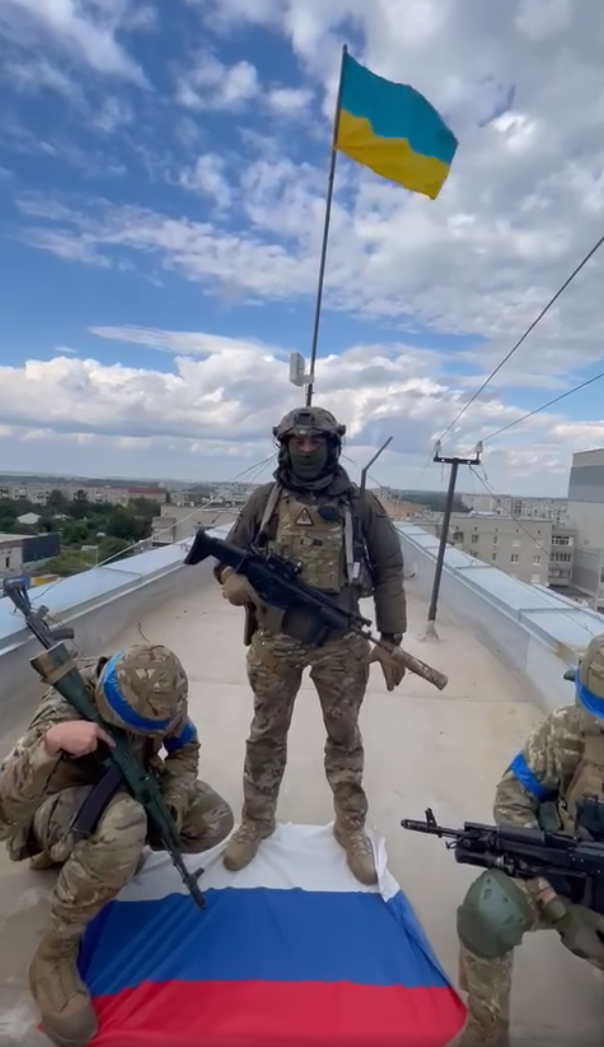
The Ukrainian flag raised in Balakliia, 8 September

On 6 September, having concentrated their forces north of Balakliia at Pryshyb, a small village about 15 km northwest of Balakliia, Ukrainian troops launched a counteroffensive in the Kharkiv Oblast, which drove Russian forces back to the left bank of the Donets and Serednya Balakliika rivers. The Ukrainian forces involved were Ukrainian special forces, plus tanks, armoured personnel carriers and troops from the 92nd Mechanized Brigade.

On the same day, Ukrainian forces captured Verbivka, about 8 km east of Pryshyb and less than 3 km northwest of Balakliia. Several Russian sources reported that Russian forces demolished unspecified bridges on the eastern outskirts of Balakliia to prevent further Ukrainian advances. Ukrainian forces went around Balakliia in order to besiege it. Some Ukrainian forces stayed near Balakliia, fighting Russian forces in the center of the city while another group went north towards Volokhiv Yar.

Ukrainian troops then went on the offensive in the directions of Balakliia, Volokhiv Yar, Shevchenkove, Kupiansk and the areas of Savyntsi and Kunye, situated east of Balakliia. According to Russian sources on this line of contact Ukrainians were opposed in some areas of the line by lightly armed forces of the DPR Militia, while Ukrainian sources said that the forces in this region were professional Russian soldiers, not conscripts from the Donbas.

By the following day, Ukrainian forces had advanced some 20 kilometres (12 mi) into Russian-occupied territory, recapturing approximately 400 square kilometres (150 sq mi), and reaching positions northeast of Izium. Russian sources claimed this success was likely due to the relocation of Russian forces to Kherson, in response to the Ukrainian offensive there.

By 7 September, Balakliia was under siege, with fighting taking place in the eastern and central parts of the city. Fighting ended on 8 September, with Ukrainian forces capturing all of Balakliia. After the quick takeover of the town of Balakliia, on the same day, Ukrainian troops took over Shevchenkove in a blitzkrieg. Russian forces retreated in panic towards the city of Kupiansk, while much larger Ukrainian forces continued the offensive in the direction of Izyum and Kupiansk on the same day.

By 8 September, Ukrainian troops had advanced 50 kilometres (31 mi) deep into Russian defensive positions north of Izium. SOBR units of Russian National Guard forces lost control of Balakliia, about 44 km northwest of Izium, although Ukraine did not establish control of the city until 10 September. Near the city, Ukrainian forces recaptured the largest ammunition storage base of the Central Rocket and Artillery Directorate of the Armed Forces of Ukraine. Ukrainian forces also regained control over more than 20 settlements. On the same day, Ukrainian media reported that Ukrainian forces captured a high-ranking Russian officer on the Kharkiv front. Based on footage of the man, it was speculated that he was Lieutenant General Andrei Sychevoi, Commander of the Western Military District of the Russian Armed Forces. Russian occupation authorities in the city claimed that Russian forces began to defend Kupiansk. On the morning of 8 September, Ukraine's 80th Brigade reached the Oskil River at the village of Senkove.

On 9 September, the Russian-backed administration ordered the evacuation into Russia of the population from Izium, Kupiansk and Velykyi Burluk. Local residents later reported that at this point Russian soldiers in the area began to flee villages, leaving behind their weaponry, before Ukrainian troops even arrived. Later in the day Ukrainian forces reached Kupiansk, a vital transit hub at the junction of several of the main railway lines supplying Russian troops at the front. The Institute for the Study of War said it believed Kupiansk would likely fall in the next 72 hours. In response to the Ukrainian advance, Russian reserve units were sent as reinforcements to both Kupiansk and Izium.

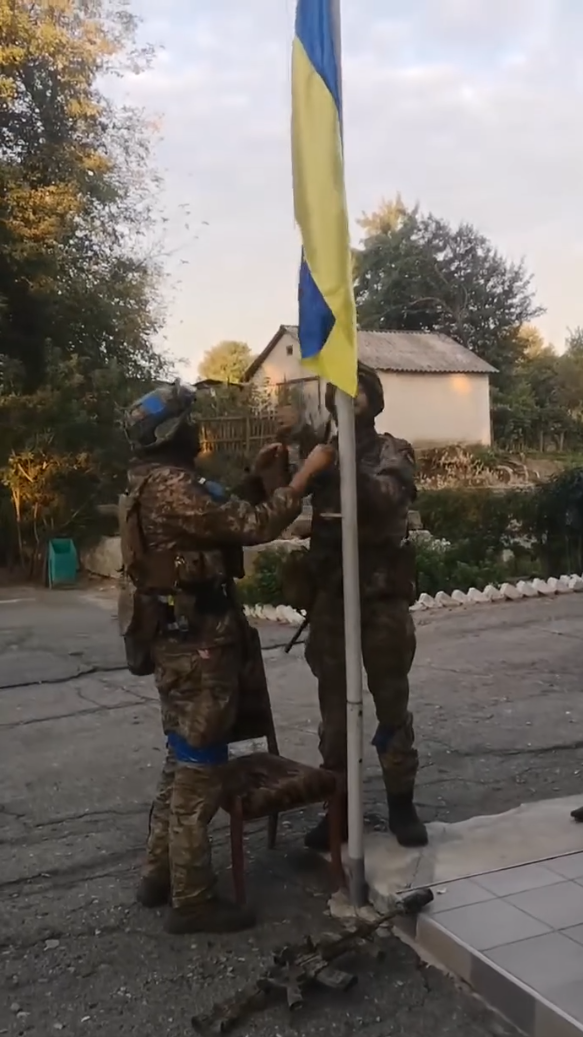
Volunteers of the Ukrainian International Legion after the liberation of Kupiansk

On 10 September, Ukrainian forces retook Kupiansk and Izium, and were reportedly advancing towards Lyman. An advisor to the head of Kharkiv regional council, Natalia Popova, posted photos on Facebook of the 92nd Mechanized Brigade's 1st Mechanized Battalion holding a Ukrainian flag outside Kupiansk city hall. Ukrainian security officials and police moved into the recaptured settlements to check the identities of those who stayed under Russian occupation. Later that day, Luhansk Oblast Governor Serhiy Haidai claimed that Ukrainian soldiers had advanced into the outskirts of Lysychansk, while Ukrainian partisans had reportedly managed to capture parts of Kreminna. Haidai stated Russian forces had fled the city, leaving Kreminna "practically empty". The same day, the 233rd Battalion of the 128th Territorial Defense Brigade took the villages of Bohodarivka and Semenivka near Shevchenkove, with the support of the 192nd Battalion of the 124th Territorial Defense Brigade. Also on 10 September, Zelenskyy announced that Ukraine's 113th Territorial Defense Brigade had captured the village of Artemivka. Units of the 113th Brigade took control of Velykyi Burluk the next day, reaching the state border near Vovchansk soon after.

The New York Times said "the fall of the strategically important city of Izium, in Ukraine's east, is the most devastating blow to Russia since its humiliating retreat from Kyiv." The Russian Ministry of Defence spokesperson Igor Konashenkov responded to these developments by claiming that Russian forces in the Balakliia and Izium area would "regroup" in the Donetsk area "in order to achieve the stated goals of the special military operation to liberate Donbas". Zelenskyy claimed that Ukraine had recaptured 2,000 square kilometres (770 sq mi) since the start of the counteroffensive.

On 11 September, Newsweek reported that Ukrainian forces had "penetrated Russian lines to a depth of up to 70 kilometers in some places and retaken more than 3,000 square kilometers of territory since September 6". Reports that Russian troops had withdrawn from Kozacha Lopan and locals had raised the Ukrainian flag next to the town hall came in from local Ukrainian officials. A map used in the briefing of the Russian Ministry of Defense on the same day confirmed that Russian forces had withdrawn from Kozacha Lopan, as well as Vovchansk and other settlements on the Ukraine-Russia border. Ukrainian forces also retook Velykyi Burluk.

Financial Times attributed western-supplied HIMARS as one of the reasons that enabled Ukraine to overpower Russian forces in merely 6 days, over a span of 90 km (roughly the distance between London and Cambridge), and recover more than 2,500 km^{2} of land.

==== Russian withdrawal from Kharkiv Oblast west of Oskil River ====
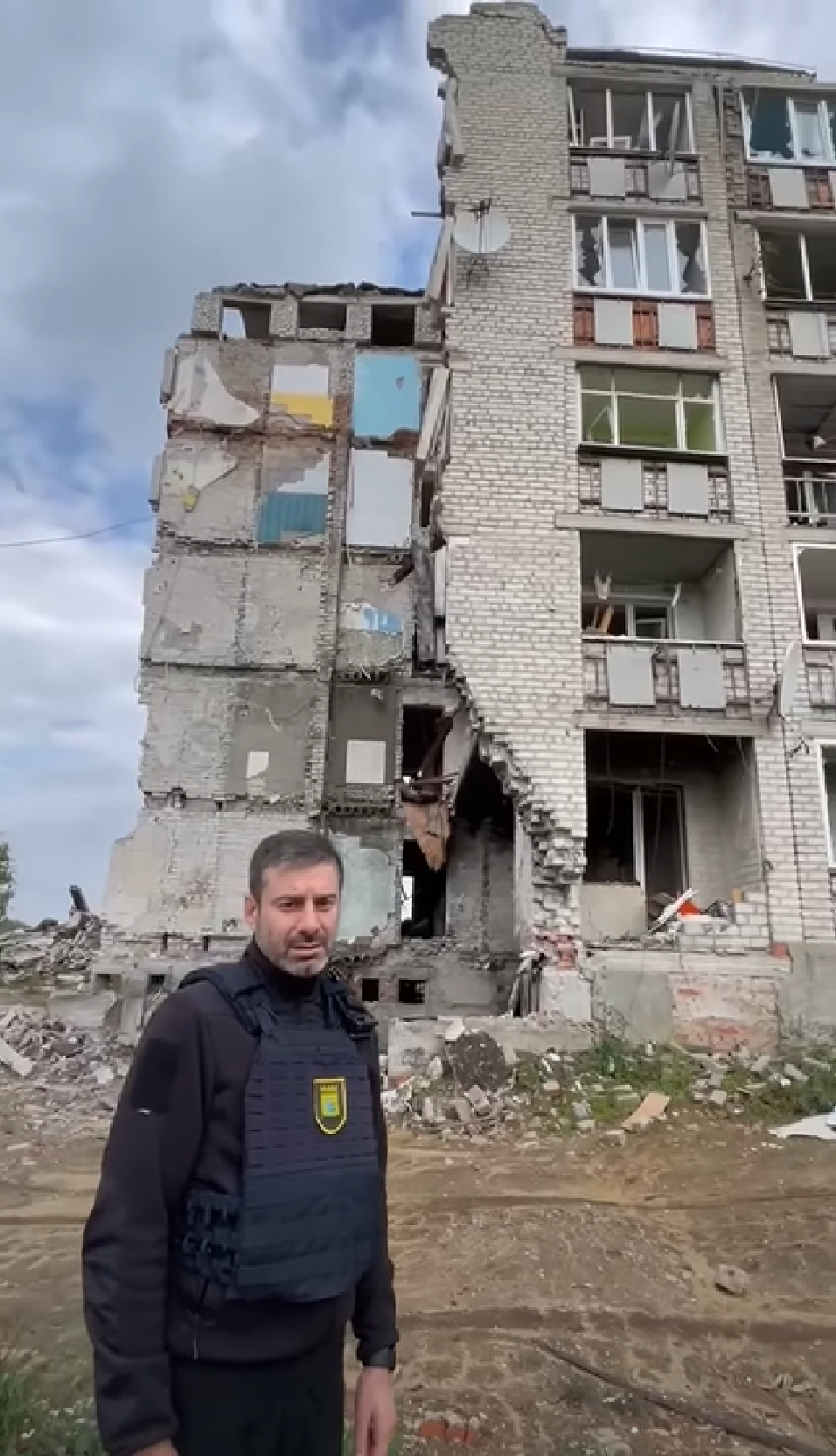
Ukrainian troops display buildings in liberated Izium, 17 September 2022

In the afternoon of 11 September, the Russian Ministry of Defense announced the formal pullout of Russian forces from nearly all of Kharkiv Oblast. The ministry "announced that an 'operation to curtail and transfer troops' was underway." At 20:06 that day, Russian Kalibr cruise missiles struck Ukrainian critical infrastructure sites (including Kharkiv TEC-5), which left Poltava, Sumy, Kharkiv, Dnipropetrovsk, Donetsk, and parts of Odesa Oblasts without electricity. Meanwhile, clashes between Ukrainian attackers and Russian defenders continued at Lyman.

South of Izium, on 10 September, the 93rd Battalion of Ukraine's 107th Brigade recaptured the village of Velyka Komyshuvakha, and the 49th "Carpathian Sich" Battalion advanced into the village of Topolske, where it captured members of Russia's 423rd Motor Rifle Regiment. By the next day, Ukraine's 81st Airmobile Brigade had retaken Bohorodychne in the Donetsk Oblast.

On 11 September, the 244th Battalion of the 112th Territorial Defense Brigade restored Ukrainian control over the Kharkiv Oblast villages of Martove, Khotimlia, Zarichne, Bereznyky, Buhaivka, Sosnovyi Bir, Ukraiinske, Pil'na, Shevchenkove, Shevchenkove Pershe, Vyshneve, Hontarivka, Berezhne, Tomakhivka and Seredivka. Units of the 112th Brigade reportedly advanced about 45 kilometres (28 mi) and reached Vovchansk by 12 September.

North of Kharkiv, on 11 September, the 249th Battalion of Ukraine's 127th Brigade announced that the village of Borshchova had returned to Ukrainian control. A local official said the same day that northwest of Kharkiv, Russian forces had abandoned the villages of Turove, Makarove, and Udy. The next day, the 14th Brigade published footage of its fighters raising the Ukrainian flag at Ternova on the Russia–Ukraine border. A day later, the 127th Brigade's 247th Battalion announced that it had captured the villages of Lyptsi, Hlyboke, and Strilecha.

On 12 September, according to the summary of the General Staff of the Armed Forces of Ukraine, the Ukrainian Defense Forces cleared Russian troops in more than 20 settlements, most noticeably in Velykyi Burluk and Dvorichna. The Russian head of the Kharkiv occupation authority, Vitaly Ganchev, revealed on Russian state media Russia-24 that Ukrainian forces outnumbered Russian forces by "8 times". The border with the Russian Belgorod Oblast has been closed after some 5,000 civilians were "evacuated" to Russia.

Ukrainian forces retook all of Kharkiv Oblast west of the Oskil River by 13 September, with media claiming that Ukrainian troops had entered Vovchansk.

==== Other gains and casualties ====
In the morning of 11 September, Luhansk Oblast Governor Serhiy Haidai claimed that Russian forces had mostly left Starobilsk. In the same message, he claimed that Russian occupational authorities were also leaving from areas that Russia had controlled since 2014, though there was no clear evidence to verify this claim.

Reports of the Russian military moving out of areas they formerly controlled in Luhansk Oblast began on 12 September alongside a withdrawal from the city of Svatove; however, Russian troops returned to Svatove on 14 September.

On 12 September, President Zelenskyy said that Ukrainian forces had retaken a total of 6,000 km^{2} from Russia, in both the south and the east. On 13 September, during his nightly address, he claimed that the Ukrainian military had recaptured 8,000 km^{2} of territory from Russia.

According to Oryx, Russia had lost at least 338 pieces of military hardware in the five days to 11 September. This included fighter jets, tanks and trucks that had been destroyed, damaged or captured.

Following the offensive, David Axe, a Forbes journalist, citing Ukrainian figures, reported that tens of thousands of Russian soldiers had been killed, captured or had deserted. By 9 September, 10,000 Russians were being encircled around Izium and the Oskil River, including the 4th Guards Tank Division, with Ukraine capturing so many prisoners that they had "nowhere to keep [them]". They also estimated that half of the 11th Army Corps had been destroyed, and that it had lost over 200 military vehicles. The Ukrainians also claimed that the 64th Separate Motor Rifle Brigade, which had a nominal strength of 2,500 men, had suffered 90% casualties during the battle. Axe also estimated that the 1st Guards Tank Army's 4th Guards Tank Division, made up of two regiments, had lost at least 100 T-80 tanks, or half of their total strength, in just 100 hours. He also stated that the Tank Army's 2nd Guards Motorized Rifle Division, also consisting of two regiments, had also largely been destroyed and rendered unfit for combat as a result of the offensive. However, Foreign Policy, in an analysis almost a year later, stated despite the Russian withdrawal seeming like a rout, Russian forces avoided the capture or destruction of most of their units.

On 18 September, in Kharkiv Oblast, a Russian T-90M was captured - the first confirmed in the war. The tank fell to Ukrainian forces without visible damage, and was most likely abandoned by the Russian military during a hasty retreat from the Kharkiv region.

=== Operations east of the Oskil River (13 September–October 2022) ===
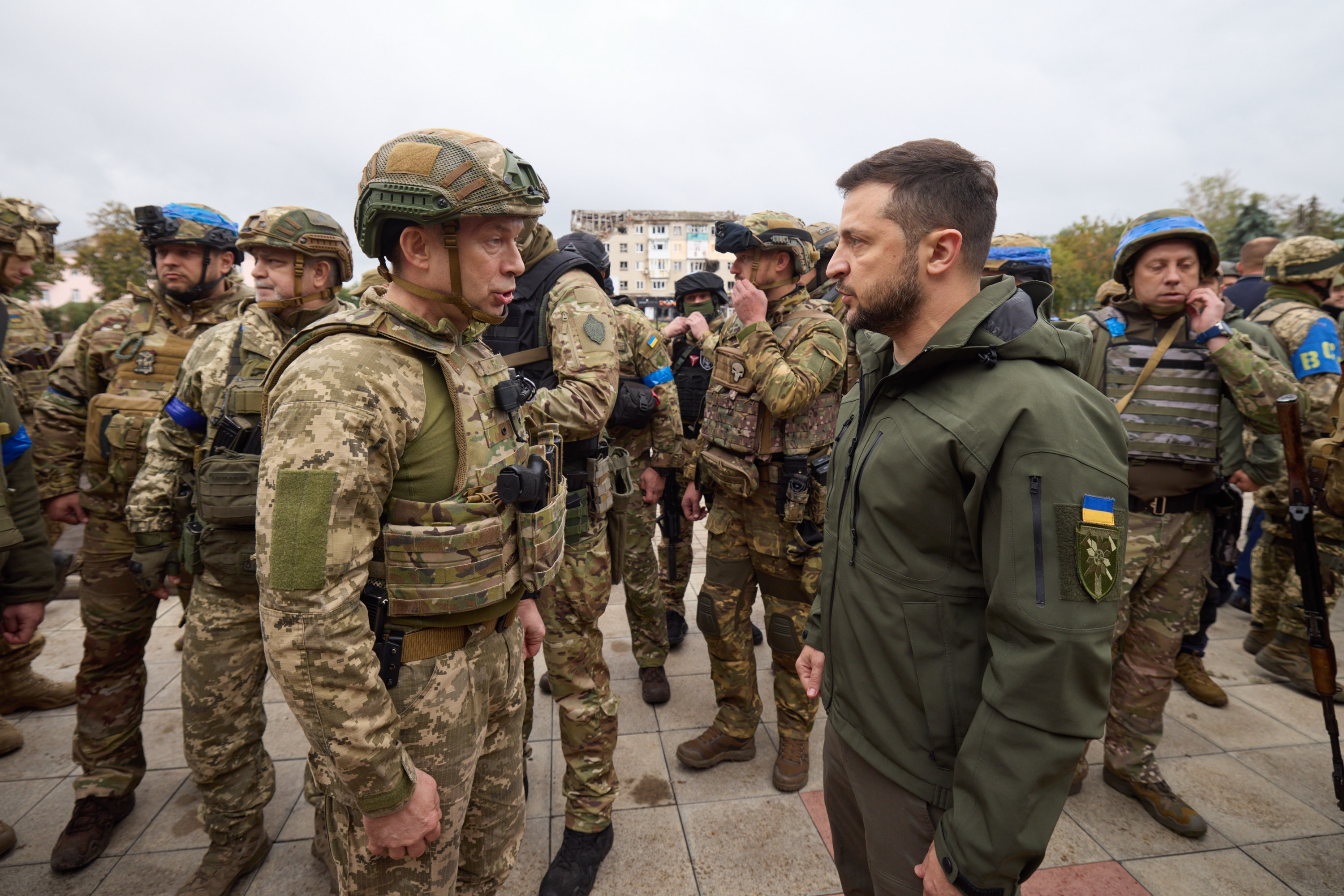
President Zelenskyy with General Oleksandr Syrskyi in the Kharkiv Oblast, 14 September 2022

Despite Russia's reported intent to keep the front line along Oskil River, Ukrainian forces had already crossed the river as early as 13 September at several locations.

By 18 September, the Ukrainian military stated that it had crossed over to and controlled the east side of the Oskil River, and by 24–25 September, David Axe claimed that the Ukrainian military had established at least five bridgeheads on the east side of Oskil River.

==== Oskil River crossings in the Kharkiv Oblast ====
Around 13 September, Ukrainian forces crossed the river near Borova and established a bridgehead.

On 15 September, some Russian sources claimed Ukrainian forces set up artillery positions at Hryanykivka, across from Dvorichna on the east side of the Oskil River. On 22 September, ISW reported that "Ukrainian forces have taken ground east of Dvorichna and are fighting in Tavilzhanka, which is reportedly still contested territory." There were reports that Ukrainian forces liberated Hrianykivka, a settlement just west of Tavilzhanka, on 15 September when Ukraine set up artillery positions there. Thus it is "consistent with previous reporting on continued Ukrainian efforts to penetrate the current Russian defensive lines that run along the Oskil River and push eastward." On 24 September, Ukrainian forces liberated Horobivka, a settlement east of Hrianykivka on the east side of the Oskil River.

On 16 September, Ukrainian forces captured the eastern portion of Kupiansk on the east side of the Oskil River, establishing another bridgehead over the Oskil River and thus taking control of the entire city of Kupiansk. This further threatened Russian supply lines in northern Luhansk Oblast, imperiling Russian operations throughout the rest of Donbas. On 24 September, Ukrainian forces liberated Petropavlivka, 7 kilometres (4.3 mi) east of Kupiansk. Ukrainian forces liberated two more settlements by 24 September: Kucherivka and Podoly. The Institute for the Study of War assessed that Synkivka in Kharkiv Oblast came under Ukrainian control on 2 October, based on statements made by the Russian defence ministry.

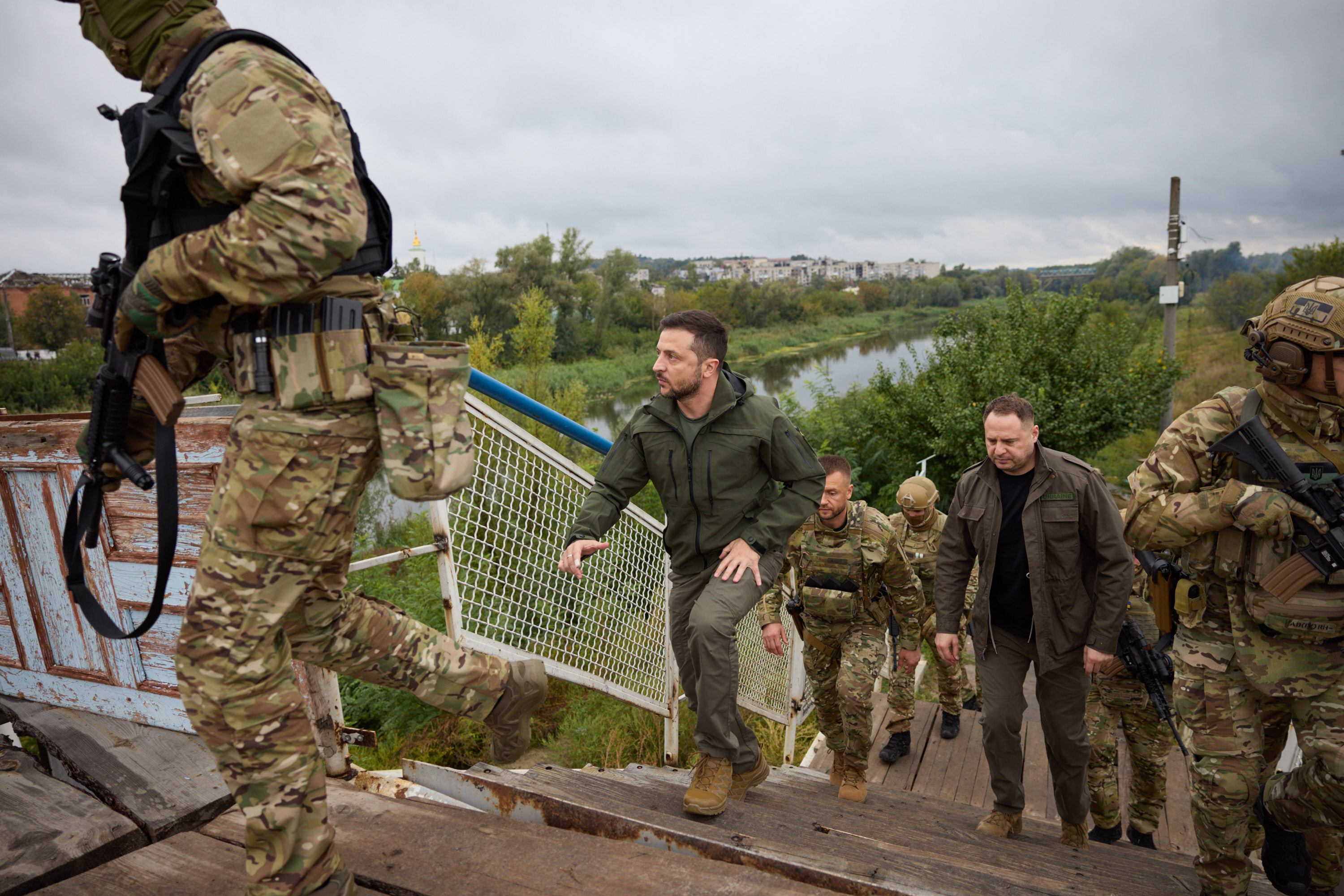
Ukrainian President Volodymyr Zelenskyy near the front line in the Kharkiv Oblast

==== Oskil River crossings in the Donetsk Oblast, encirclement and recapture of Lyman ====
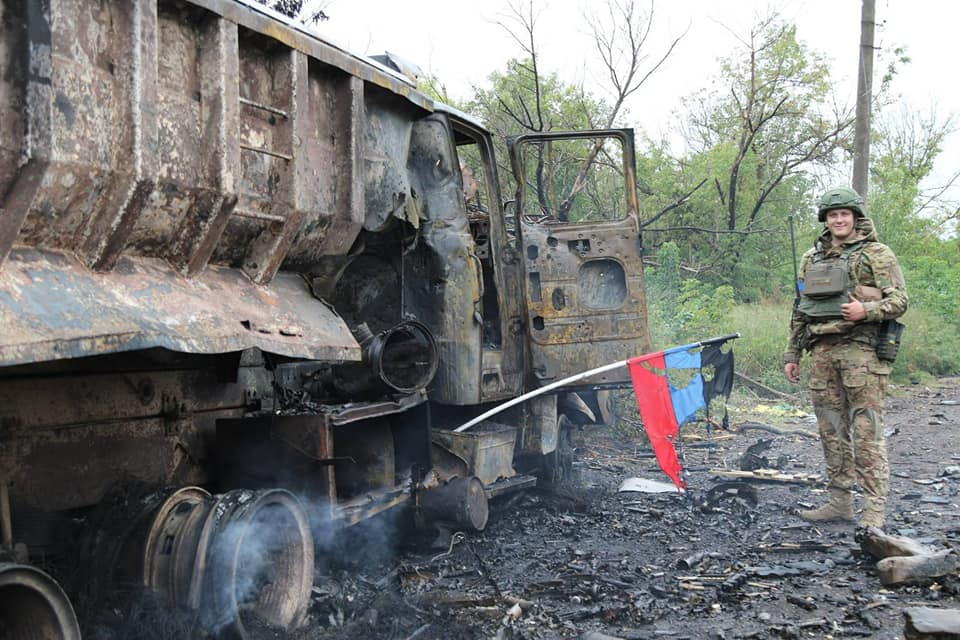
Ukrainian military with destroyed weapons of Donetsk separatists, 23 September 2022

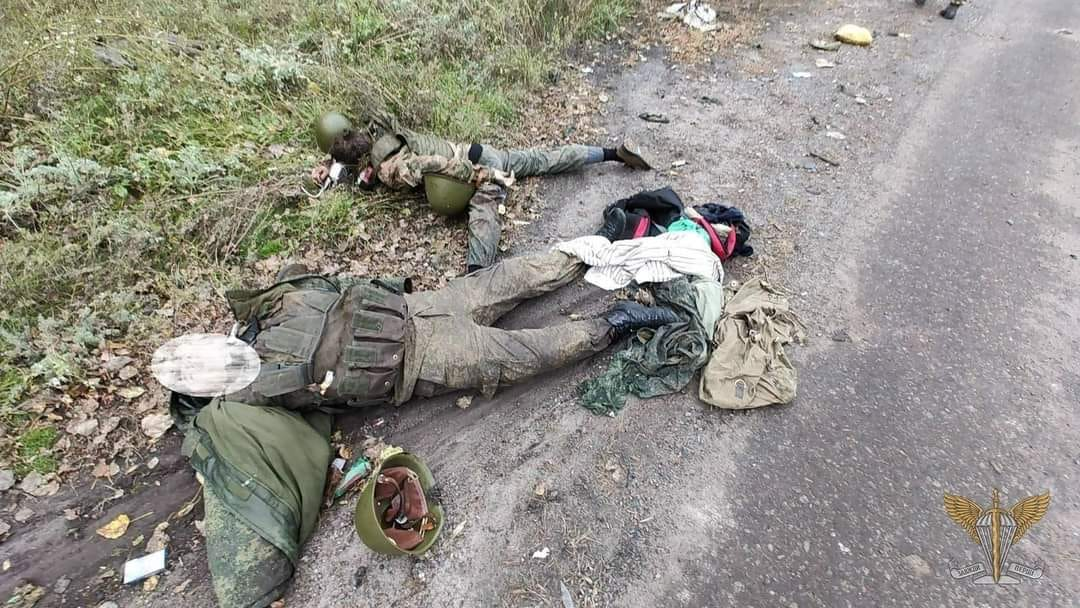
Deceased Russian soldiers during the retreat from Lyman, 1 October 2022

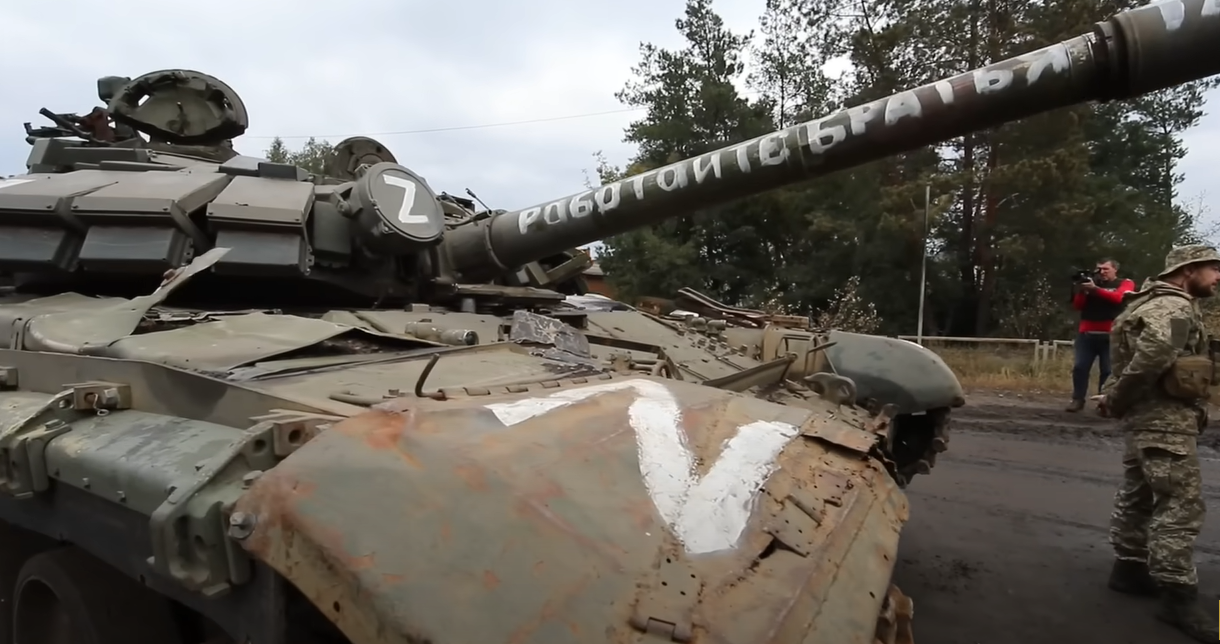
Russian tanks abandoned by the Russian army in the retreat from Izium

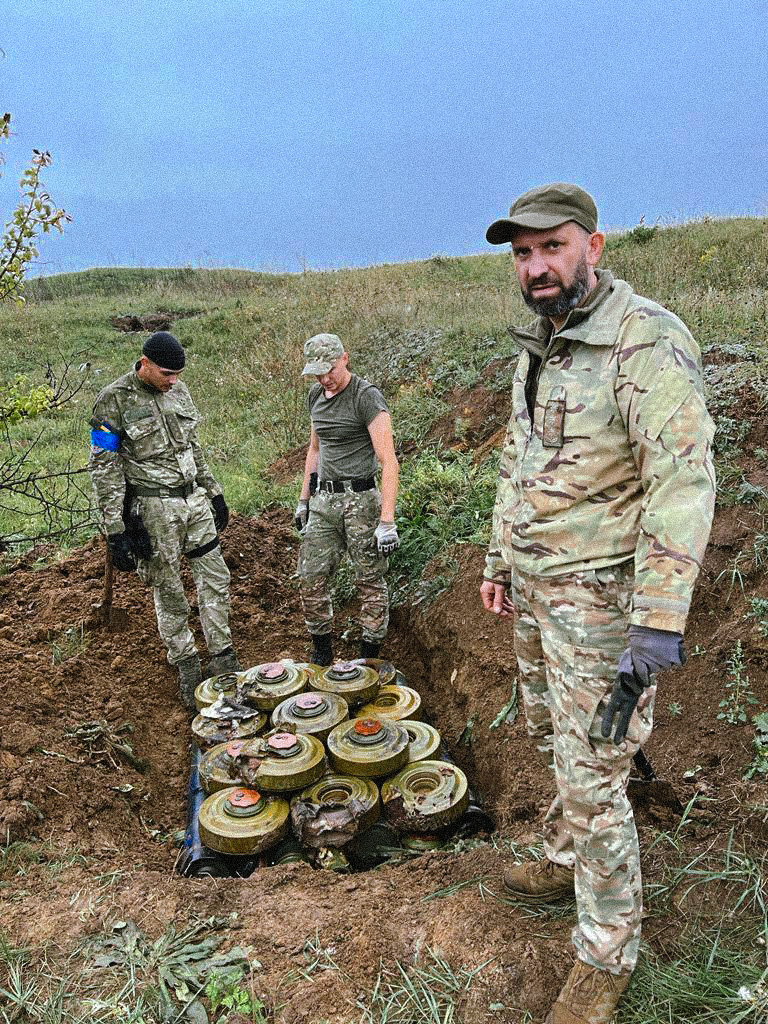
Demining operations in Kharkiv Oblast, 28 September 2022

As a result of the Ukraine's "lightning counteroffensive" throughout September, Russian forces retreated to Lyman, a major city in Donetsk Oblast with critical Russian supply lines. According to the British Ministry of Defense, "Lyman's operational importance was due to its command over a road crossing over the Siverskyi Donets River, behind which Russia has been attempting to consolidate its defenses." On 26 September, the New York Times reported a standoff between the critical cities of then-Russian-held Lyman and Ukrainian-controlled Bakhmut. With the approaching winter likely to stall both militaries, Lyman was set to be the battle that decided the eastern theater of the war.

On 3 September, Ukraine's 103rd Territorial Defense Brigade began to conduct combat operations in the Donetsk Oblast as part of a major Ukrainian offensive. The brigade's 63rd Battalion established crossings over the Siverskyi Donets river from the village of Kryva Luka, and, with the support of units of the Ukrainian National Guard's 15th Regiment, took control of the village of Ozerne. The Institute for the Study of War said that the capture of the village implied "degrading Russian control of the river's left bank east of Sloviansk". By 5 September, Ukrainian forces had also retaken the village of Staryi Karavan.

On 12 September, Ukraine's National Guard liberated Sviatohirsk, which Russian forces captured in June 2022, and inched closer to the administrative border between Kharkiv and Donetsk Oblasts as well as Lyman, a strategic railway town in Donetsk Oblast that Russian forces captured in late May 2022.

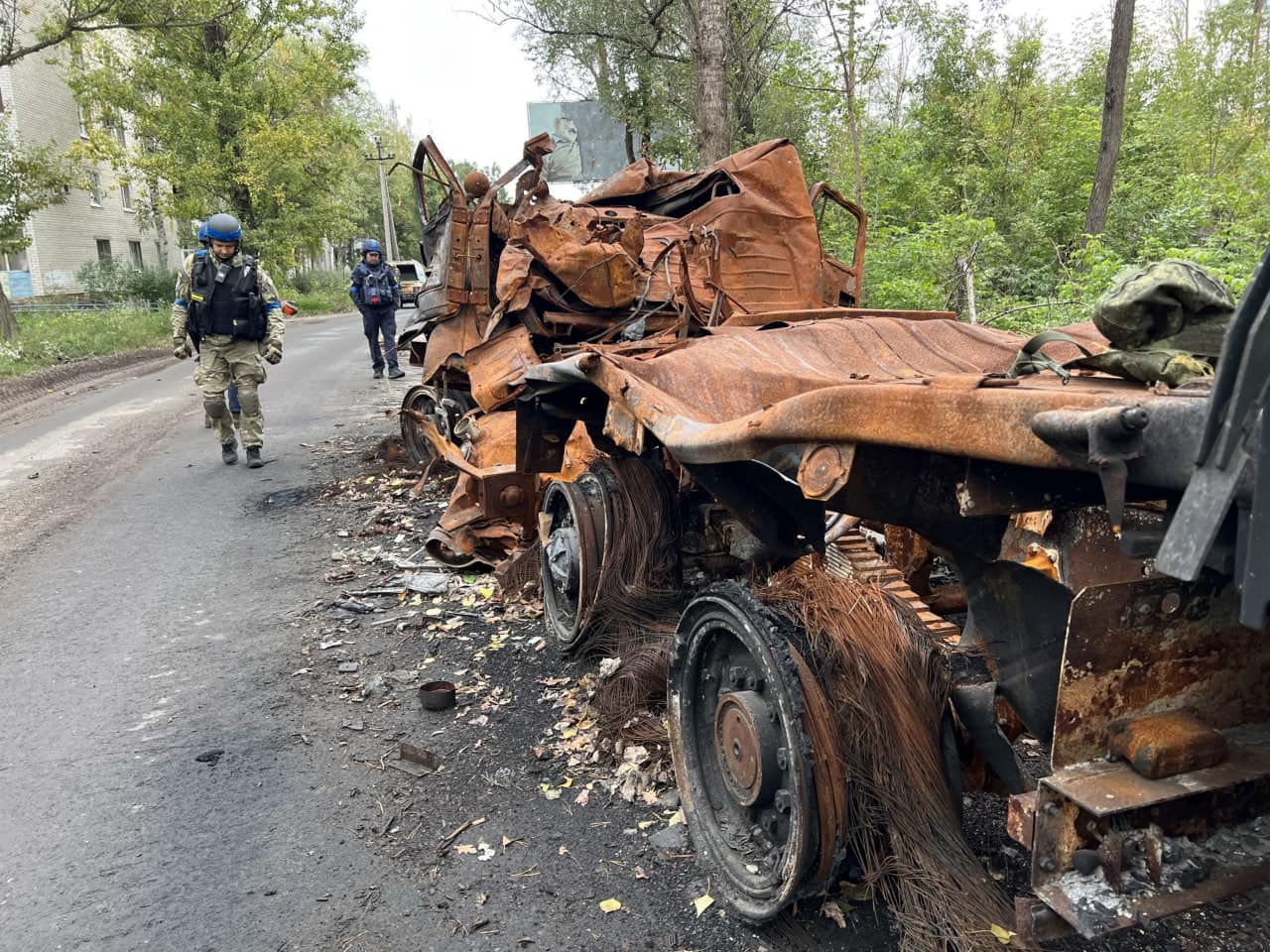
Russian weaponry destroyed following the Ukrainian recapture of Sviatohirsk

On 15 September, Ukrainian forces recaptured Sosnove in Donetsk Oblast, and forced Russian forces to withdraw from Studenok, a village in Kharkiv Oblast southeast of Izium, to avoid encirclement. On 23 September Ukrainian Armed Forces liberated the village of Yatskivka in Donetsk Oblast according to Oleksii Hromov, deputy head of operations directorate of the general staff of UAF. On 25 September, Ukrainian forces likely obtained control of Maliivka, a settlement just north of the Kharkiv-Donetsk border.

On 26 September, Ukrainian forces advanced north from Donetsk Oblast and liberated Pisky-Radkivski. The settlement is on the east side of the Oskil River in Kharkiv Oblast, located 35 kilometres (22 mi) northwest of Lyman. Kupiansk-Vuzlovyi was captured on the same day.

On 27 September, further incremental gains were reported east of the Oskil river, with Ukrainian forces entering the towns of Ridkodub and Korovyi Yar.

On 28 September, Ukrainian forces entered the town of Novoselivka located in the Donetsk region, a strategic crossing point about 12 km northwest of Lyman, on the left bank of the Oskil River.

On 30 September, Ukrainian forces liberated Yampil, a key village 8 kilometres (5.0 mi) to the southeast of Lyman. A pro-Russian Telegram channel reported that Ukrainian forces managed to "break through Russian defenses, forcing Russian troops to retreat to Lyman." Zelenskyy also reported that Ukrainian troops had captured the town of Drobysheve, 10 kilometres (6.2 mi) to the northwest of Lyman.

On 1 October, video footage emerged of Ukrainian troops raising the Ukrainian flag at an entrance to Lyman, and there were reportedly up to 5,000 Russian troops encircled within the city. Serhii Cherevatyi, spokesperson for Ukraine's eastern forces, claimed that Ukrainian forces successfully surrounded Russian forces in the city. Ukrainian forces advanced into the city, and according to The Guardian, the battle in Lyman "was a bloody rout." Russian officers had refused invitations to surrender, so Russian troops fled in a disorganized manner. The city was significantly damaged during the Russian occupation, with locals stating only a few hundred remained of the 27,000 who lived in Lyman before the war. Russian authorities confirmed the loss of Lyman later that afternoon. Initially, there were no clear estimates of casualties during the battle. Associated Press reporters noted that at least 18 Russian bodies remained on the streets on 3 October. Later, however, the Ukrainians claimed to have killed over 1,500 Russian soldiers during the retaking of the city.

The gains came a day after Russian president Putin announced annexation of Russian-occupied territories at a ceremony in Moscow, claiming the occupied regions of Ukraine, including the Donbas, were now integral Russian territory. Retired US Lieutenant General Ben Hodges said that "[the recapture of Lyman] puts in bright lights that [Putin's] claim is illegitimate and cannot be enforced."

The Institute for the Study of War assessed Yampolivka in Donetsk Oblast had come under Ukrainian control on 2 October, based on statements made by the Russian defence ministry.

==== Operations in Luhansk Oblast ====
On 19 September, video footage confirmed that Ukrainian forces had liberated the village of Bilohorivka in Luhansk Oblast, signifying that Russia no longer maintained full control of the region.

On 2 October, Ukrainian troops recaptured Dibrova in the Luhansk Oblast.

==== Continued Ukrainian advances ====
On 3 October, Ukrainian forces entered Borova and Shyikivka in Kharkiv Oblast. Some Ukrainian sources claimed that Russian forces had also fled from Nyzhche Solone, Pidlyman, Nyzhnia Zhuravka in Kharkiv Oblast, with Ukrainian authorities regaining control in these settlements. Russian sources said that Ukrainian forces were conducting reconnaissance-in-force at Zahoriukivka and were planning to advance eastward from Kupiansk and Petropavlivka. Iziumske and Druzheliubivka in Kharkiv Oblast came under Ukrainian control the same day, according to Ukrainian sources. Ukrainian forces also reportedly took Terny and Torske in Donetsk Oblast. Russian sources suggested that Ukrainian forces would launch an attack on Kreminna.

Ukrainian officials claimed the next day that the Ukrainian forces had retaken control of the Kreminna-Svatove Highway, although the ISW disputed this, and continued to consider it Russian-controlled as of 4 October.

By 5 October images appeared on social media of Ukrainian troops at the entrance sign to Hrekivka and Makiivka, 20 km southwest of Svatove.

On 9 October, Serhii Haidai reported that Ukrainian forces had recaptured seven more villages in Svatove Raion: Novoliubivka, Nevske, Hrekivka, Nadiya, Andriivka, Novoiehorivka, and Stelmakhivka.

On 24 October, the General Staff of Ukraine's Armed Forces announced the recapture of four settlements: Nevske, Miasozharivka and Karmazynivka in Luhansk Oblast, and Novosadove in Donetsk Oblast. According to the Russian sources, Ukrainian forces also took control of the Kreminna-Svatove Highway.

== Reactions ==
=== Russia ===
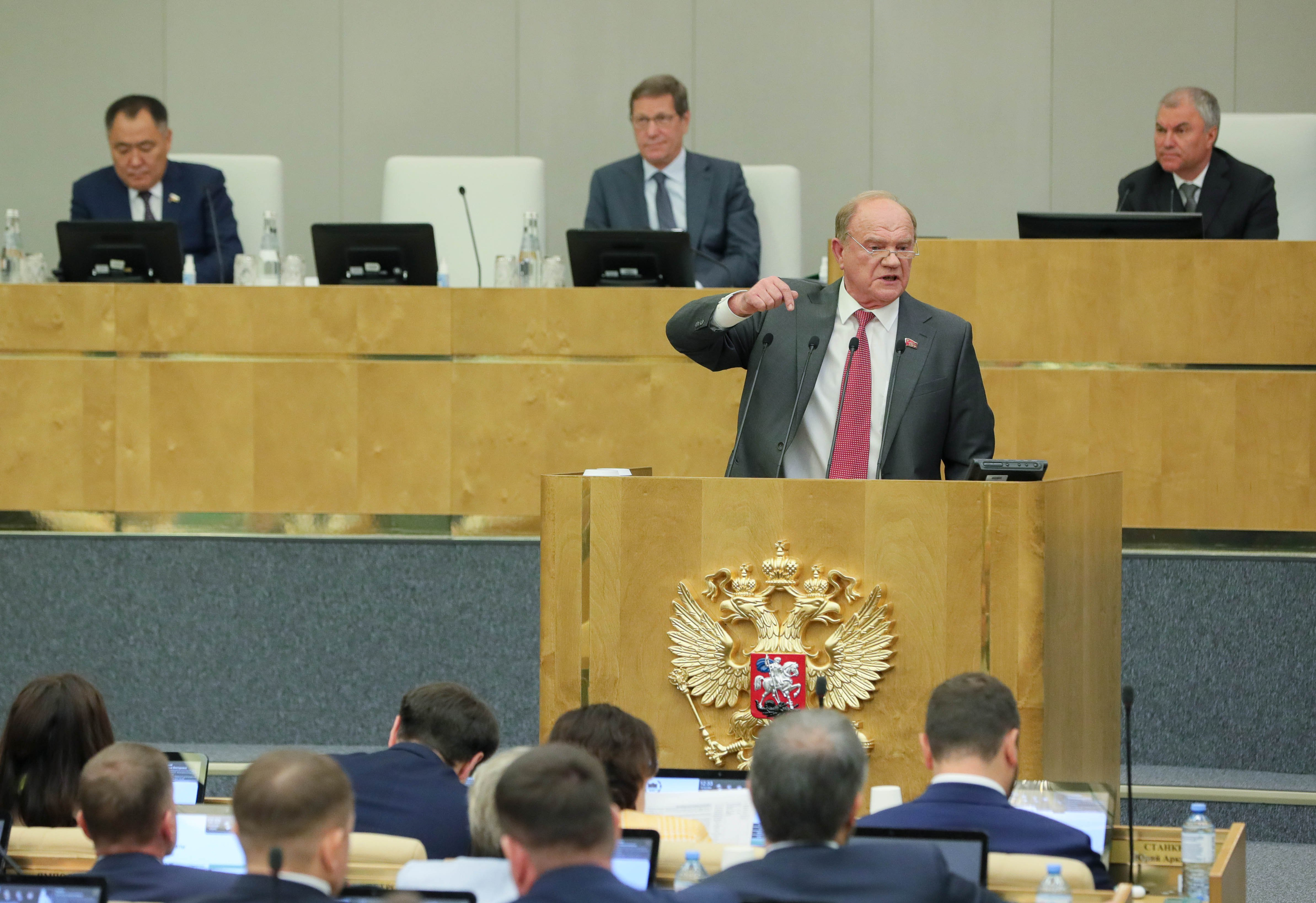
CPRF leader Gennady Zyuganov calls for mobilization at the first meeting of the State Duma after the counteroffensive began

On 7 September 2022, a day after the start of the Ukrainian offensive, Putin claimed during his speech at the Eastern Economic Forum in Vladivostok that "We have not lost anything and will not lose anything" in the war in Ukraine.

The near-complete silence of the Russian authorities on the defeat – or any explanation for the developments there – generated considerable anger among some pro-war commentators and Russian nationalists on social media. On 11 September, some called for President Vladimir Putin to make immediate changes to ensure final victory in the war, with a number of pro-war bloggers calling for mobilization inside Russia. Russian state-funded media later criticized the defeat, with a pro-Kremlin tabloid blaming "supply and manpower shortages, poor coordination, and tactical mistakes orchestrated by military officials".

The former separatist commander and pro-war military blogger Igor Girkin said on social media that Russian Defence Minister Sergei Shoigu should be executed by firing squad, and he publicly expressed his belief that "the war in Ukraine will continue until the complete defeat of Russia. We have already lost; the rest is just a matter of time." He said that full mobilization in Russia remained the "last chance" for victory. Pro-Kremlin war journalist Alexander Kots publicly stated that "We need to do something about the system where our leadership doesn't like to talk about bad news, and their subordinates don't want to upset their superiors."

While Ukraine was conducting its counteroffensive, Vladimir Putin opened a Ferris wheel in Moscow's VDNKh and celebrated Moscow City Day. War bloggers criticized him for continuing the celebrations.

On the evening of 10 September, a festive fireworks display took place in Moscow. Many pro-war politicians inside Russia, like the leader of A Just Russia — For Truth Sergey Mironov, allegedly called for its cancellation before the event.

Chechen leader Ramzan Kadyrov questioned Russian leadership of the war, writing on Telegram: "They have made mistakes and I think they will draw the necessary conclusions. If they don't make changes in the strategy of conducting the special military operation in the next day or two, I will be forced to contact the leadership of the Defense Ministry and the leadership of the country to explain the real situation on the ground."

On 12 September, Mikhail Sheremet, a State Duma deputy from United Russia, advocated "full mobilization". On 13 September, the leader of the Communist Party of the Russian Federation Gennady Zyuganov spoke for the maximum mobilization of forces and resources, but later the Press Secretary of the CPRF Alexander Yushchenko said that Zyuganov called for the mobilization of the economy and resources, and not the population, and recommended to "execute some groups that engage in outright provocations".

Many outside Russia interpreted subsequent Russian attacks on Ukrainian infrastructure as an attempt to at least partially satisfy demands of radical war supporters in Russia, who called for further escalation of Russian tactics.

On 20 September, the State Duma introduced amendments to the Penal Code, introducing terms "mobilization", "martial law" and inserting Articles "Marauding" and "Surrendering voluntarily". On 20 September, pro-Kremlin administrations in different Russian-occupied territories of Ukraine announced "referendums" on merging these territories with Russia. Analysts consider that one of the aims of such a formal annexation of the territories is to give Putin a pretext of "defending Russian territory" if he needs to order a mobilization of Russia's conscripts.

On 21 September, Russian President Vladimir Putin announced a partial mobilisation. On 26 September, the British Ministry of Defense said that many new conscripts were already being deployed in Ukraine without any training or proper equipment. Some of the mobilized Russian men were killed less than two weeks after being drafted, including St. Petersburg lawyer Andrei Nikiforov, who was killed near the Ukrainian city of Lysychansk on 7 October. This indicated that Russian men are being sent to the front without basic military training, which would contradict Putin's promise that all mobilized civilians would undergo basic training before being sent into combat.

=== Worldwide ===
The Institute for the Study of War (ISW) noted that the rapid pace of the Ukrainian counteroffensive was disrupting the Russian army's long-held ground lines of communication, used to supply the Russian army in northern Luhansk Oblast, and would lead to a serious hindrance to Russia's operations according to ISW's analysis. As of 11 September, ISW noted that Western weapons were necessary for the success of Ukraine, but not enough, and skillful planning and execution of the campaign played a decisive role in the lightning success. ISW contended that long preparations and the announcement of a counter-offensive in the Kherson region had confused the Russians, leading to a diversion of the Russian army's attention away from the Kharkiv region, where the Ukrainian army subsequently struck.

On 10 September, representatives of the British Ministry of Defence suggested that the Russian army practically had not defended most of the territories recaptured by Ukraine.

Reuters and the BBC called the loss of Izium, which the Russian army had been trying to occupy for over a month at the start of the invasion, a "great humiliation" for Russian President Vladimir Putin and Moscow's worst defeat since the retreat from Kyiv in March. Financial Times ran an article on 28 September depicting the counteroffensive as "[the] 90km journey that changed the course of the war in Ukraine." According to ISW, the recapture of Izium, occupied in early April, destroyed Russia's prospect of seizing the Donetsk Oblast.

According to Ukrainian foreign minister Dmytro Kuleba, Ukraine's counteroffensives proved that the Ukrainian military could end the war faster with more Western weapons, a statement that President Zelenskyy echoed on 12 September. Ukraine's successes in Kharkiv Oblast served as a crucial confidence boost for Kyiv, which is increasingly reliant on its Western allies for military aid.

Clashes on the Armenia–Azerbaijan border erupted shortly after Russia suffered setbacks in counteroffensive, weakening its force projection in the region.

== Aftermath of the first phase ==
=== Mass graves and evidence of torture ===
After the successful recapture of the region from Russian forces, Ukrainian authorities discovered torture chambers that Russian troops had been using during their time in control of the area, including in the villages of Balakliia and Kozacha Lopan. Ukrainian President Volodymyr Zelenskyy stated that more than ten torture chambers, along with mass graves, had been discovered in the Kharkiv areas liberated by Ukrainian troops.

As Ukrainian forces entered the towns of Balakliia and Izium, they found numerous places where Russian occupation forces held Ukrainian civilians prisoner, with evidence of torture and executions. Russian forces also reportedly abducted seven Sri Lankan students. The death toll among civilians as result of the initial Russian siege and subsequent occupation was initially estimated at 1,000 residents. After the expulsion of Russian forces, witnesses described that Russians detained, abducted, tortured and executed local residents during the occupation; a number of burial sites were found. In Sviatohirsk, Donetsk Oblast, according to the Security Service of Ukraine, a place of detention was found near the Sviatohirsk Lavra, with items indicating signs of torture.

Ukrainian police officers found evidence of a torture chamber that housed 40 civilians in the basement of the Balakliia police station. The locals that remained in the city claimed that unlike other areas under Russian occupation like Bucha and Irpin, Russian occupation forces were generally much more tame in their treatment of civilians.

Exhumation of the bodies from Izium mass graves buried in Pishanske cemetery started on 15 September, and the police revealed that most victims were civilians. Some bodies of civilians and soldiers had traces of torture, hands tied and rope around their necks, suggesting they were not killed in battle or bombing, but executed as prisoners. Russian diplomats dismissed the claims as a "provocation" and Kremlin spokesman Dmitry Peskov rejected Ukraine's accusations as a "lie", but satellite images that Maxar published confirmed presence of the graves before the Ukrainian counteroffensive. In total, ten torture and execution sites were discovered in the town of Izium. In Lyman, 152 civilians and 35 Ukrainian soldiers were exhumed from mass graves.

=== Military decorations ===
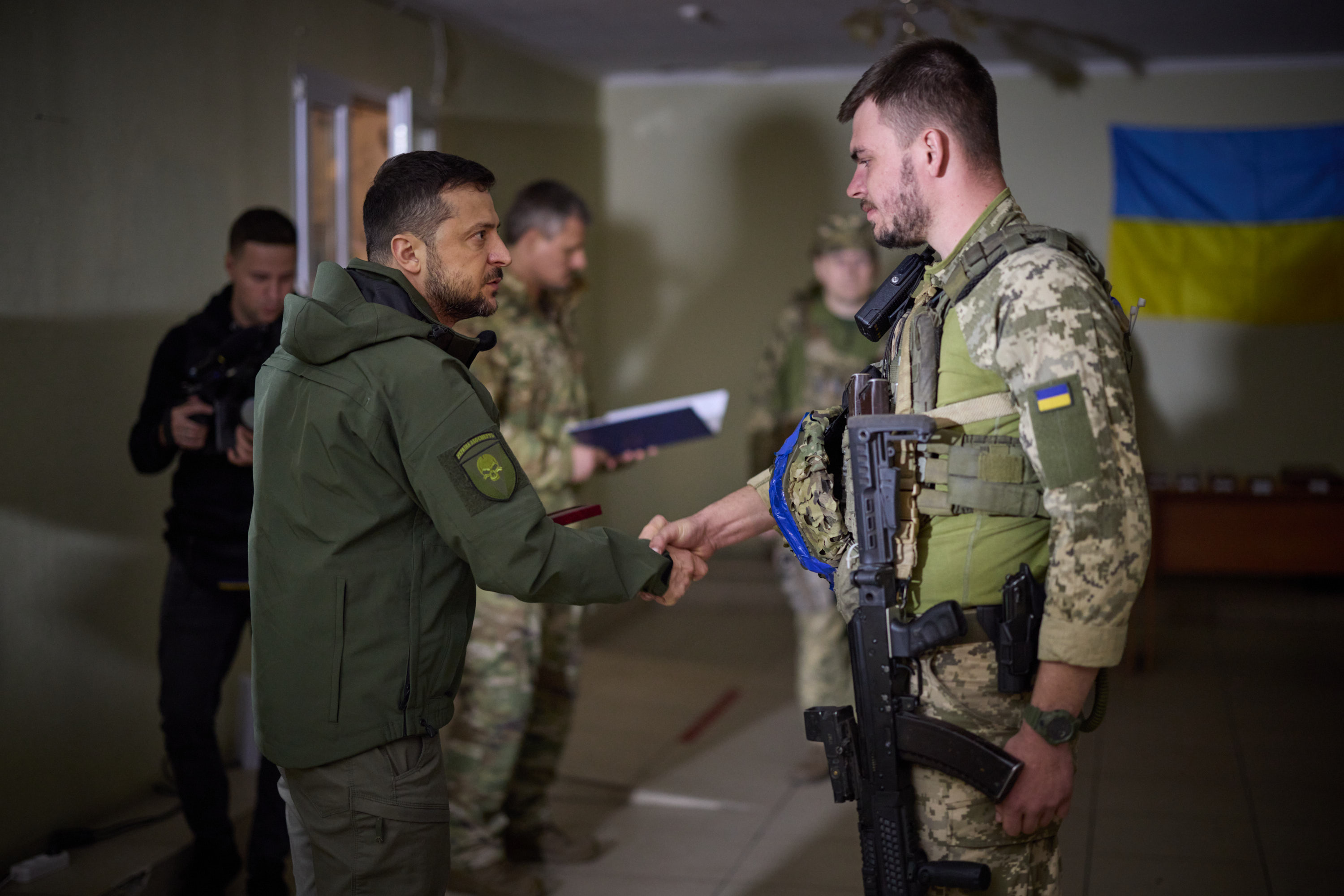
Zelenskyy awarding a soldier near the front line in the Kharkiv Oblast

On 14 September President Zelenskyy visited the liberated city of Izium and decorated soldiers who had participated in the operation. In his daily address he named units that had participated: the 14th and 92nd Separate Mechanized Brigades, 25th Separate Airborne Brigade, 80th Separate Airborne Assault Brigade, 107th Rocket Artillery Brigade, the 40th, 43rd, and 44th Separate Artillery Brigades, 26th Artillery Brigade, 15th Artillery Reconnaissance Brigade, and Main Intelligence Directorate.

=== Effect on Russian referendums ===
On 12 September, Meduza reported that, per two sources close to the Kremlin, the proposed referendums for the annexation of the self-proclaimed Luhansk and Donetsk People's Republics had been postponed indefinitely, following earlier postponement from 11 September to 4 November. However, the counteroffensives in Kherson and Kharkiv ultimately brought forward the 2022 annexation referendums in Russian-occupied Ukraine, which Russian officials rescheduled from November to late September 2022.

=== Russian losses ===
According to both Western and Ukrainian sources, the Russians lost 200 tanks to "destruction or capture" during the Kharkiv operation. Of the 100 tanks captured by Ukrainian forces during the first three weeks, two-thirds were T-72s, while the rest were T-80s, and at least one T-90. Also captured were 100 BMP fighting vehicles, 43 BTRs, 14 R-149MA1 and eight R-149MA3 command vehicles, as well as three dozen 152mm artillery pieces and more than a dozen Grad MLRs. In addition, "hundreds" of anti-tank weapons and "tens of thousands" of artillery rounds were also reported to have been captured.

On 17 September, Zelenskyy claimed that several hundred Russian soldiers had been taken prisoner since the offensive was launched.

== Aftermath of the second phase ==
During November, there were little territorial changes due to the muddy terrain, although fierce battles raged every day. Much of the Russian defense line in northern Luhansk oblast became staffed with newly mobilized Russian conscripts throughout November. In early December, Ukrainian forces broke through Russian lines around Chervonopopivka, with fighting mostly centered west of the R-66 highway connecting Kreminna and Svatove. On 18 December, a geolocated video showed Ukrainian forces advancing in the Serebriansky forest south of Kreminna.

== Units involved ==
Ukrainian units involved include:

- 92nd Mechanized Brigade
- 25th Airborne Brigade
- 80th Air Assault Brigade
- 81st Airmobile Brigade
- 14th Mechanized Brigade
- 54th Mechanized Brigade
- 111th Territorial Defense Brigade
- 112th Territorial Defense Brigade
  - 244th Territorial Defense Battalion
- 113th Territorial Defense Brigade
  - 125th Territorial Defense Battalion
- 49th Infantry Battalion
- 62nd Battalion, 103rd Territorial Defense Brigade
- 63rd Battalion, 103rd Territorial Defense Brigade
- 64th Battalion, 103rd Territorial Defense Brigade
- 65th Battalion, 103rd Territorial Defense Brigade
- 66th Battalion, 103rd Territorial Defense Brigade
- 67th Battalion, 103rd Territorial Defense Brigade
- 77th Battalion, 102nd Territorial Defense Brigade
- 80th Battalion, 105th Territorial Defense Brigade
- 83rd Battalion, 105th Territorial Defense Brigade
- 93rd Battalion, 107th Territorial Defense Brigade
- 136th Battalion, 114th Territorial Defense Brigade
- 192nd Battalion, 124th Territorial Defense Brigade
- 233rd Battalion, 128th Territorial Defense Brigade
- 247th Battalion, 127th Territorial Defense Brigade
- 249th Battalion, 127th Territorial Defense Brigade
- 26th Artillery Brigade
- 40th Artillery Brigade
- 43rd Artillery Brigade
- 44th Artillery Brigade
- 107th Rocket Artillery Brigade
- Ukrainian National Guard
  - 15th Regiment

Russian units involved include:

- 11th Army Corps
- 2nd Guards Motor Rifle Division
- 4th Guards Tank Division
- 64th Motor Rifle Brigade
- Donetsk People's Militia
- SOBR

== See also ==
- 2023 Ukrainian counteroffensive
- Territorial control during the Russo-Ukrainian War
- Makiivka surrender incident
