= Khotimlya =

Khotimlya (Ukrainian: Хотімля, Russian: Хотимля) may refer to:

- Khotimlya, Ukraine, a village in the Kharkiv Oblast, also spelled Khotimlia
- Khotimlya, Russia, a village in Bashkortostan
