= 112th Territorial Defense Brigade =

Ukrainian Territorial Defense Forces unit

- Ukrainian: 112-та окрема бригада територіальної оборони
- Active: Spring 2018 – present
- Country: Ukraine
- Branch: Armed Forces of Ukraine
- Type: Military reserve force
- Role: Light infantry
- Part of: Territorial Defense Forces; Operational Command North
- Garrison/HQ: Kyiv; MUN А7040
- Engagements: Russo-Ukrainian war: Russian invasion of Ukraine

Commanders
- Current commander: Colonel Vladyslav Kosenko

Insignia
- Flag

The 112th Territorial Defense Brigade (Ukrainian: 112-та окрема бригада територіальної оборони) is a military formation of the Territorial Defense Forces of Ukraine in Kyiv. It is part of Operational Command North.

== History ==
=== Formation ===
On 20 December 2017, a meeting between military commissariats of Kyiv city, Kyiv Oblast and Operational Command North took place. Its purpose was to train staff regarding procedures for formation and organization of the brigade.

In Spring 2018 the brigade was formed in Kyiv. Lieutenant Colonel Bilosvit Mykola became its first commander. The brigade needed a core of regular soldiers and 4,000 reservists aged 40–55 year old. By November only 4.5% of needed contracts were signed with 30% needed by the end of the year. By the end of 2019 all 100% of positions needed to be filled. From 11 to 15 June a rifle company of the 127th Territorial Defense Battalion held training exercises for reservists in Desnianskyi District. During 14–15 December 2018 a training exercise for officers of headquarters and battalions was held, where they planned defending Kyiv. 6 larger districts of Kyiv had their own battalions, while the remaining 4 formed other units.

During 14–19 April 2019 another larger scale training exercise for officers of headquarters and battalions was held, where they planned defending Kyiv. This exercise included more reserve officers.

On 13 March 2021 Kyiv Mayor Vitali Klitschko with his deputies took part in a training exercise at the Desna training center.

On 18 May 2021, only 300 reservists had signed contracts with the brigade. Over 3,000 were needed to fully staff the unit. By October that number increased to 350 contract soldiers and close to 4,000 overall. On 21 December another exercise took place and a number of 5,000 soldiers was announced. With a battalion being formed in every district.

By 7 February 2022, the brigade had nine battalions and held a large exercise with all of them.

=== Russian invasion of Ukraine ===
When the full-scale Russian invasion of Ukraine began on 24 February 2022, the brigade was fully filled with reservists who manned hundreds of roadblocks. Just three days later, the brigade had filled all available vacancies in all its battalions; the abundance of volunteers prompted the decision to raise a new brigade in Kyiv. On 14 April 2022, Commander-in-Chief of the Armed Forces of Ukraine Valerii Zaluzhnyi issued a decree that transformed the 241st Territorial Defense Battalion into the headquarters of the new 241st Brigade. Battalions 130, 204, 205, 206, 207 were transferred to the 241st Kyiv City Defense Brigade.

The brigade was active in the battles of Kyiv, Hostomel, Brovary, Moshchun, Bucha, Irpin, and took part in combat in Chernobyl.

The 206th Territorial Defense Battalion was raised for defense of Kyiv and was equipped and financed by former president Petro Poroshenko. Deputies and supporters of the European Solidarity party joined the battalion. During the first week of fighting the battalion took part in the defense of Obolonskyi District during the Battle of Kyiv. In following days fought in the Battle of Hostomel and evacuated women and children during the Battle of Irpin.

The 207th Territorial Defense Battalion began forming in January and was completed by 27 February 2022. It was commanded by Yushko Viktor.

On 2 April, a special security company was raised for protection of critical infrastructure. During a military oath ceremony, Vitali Klitschko noted that 7 members of Kyiv City Council joined the company.

On 6 June, Mayor of Brovary Ihor Sapozhko announced that 250 soldiers took oath with the 55th special purpose battalion.

The 128th Territorial Defense Battalion was deployed to Chuhuiv in May, after taking part in the defense of Kyiv and remained there as of early August. In September 2022, a unit of the 112th Brigade took part in the recapture of Shevchenkove amid a Ukrainian counteroffensive in Kharkiv Oblast. The Kyiv territorial defense units were the first storm the Russian positions in the village of Mykolaivka on the morning of 7 September 2022, thus launching the Ukrainian offensive in the Chuhuiv Raion from which Shevchenkove was taken. Within six days, the unit advanced 45 kilometres (28 mi), reaching Vovchansk. By 11 September, the brigade's 244th Battalion had restored Ukrainian control over the Kharkiv Oblast villages of Martove, Khotimlia, Zarichne, Bereznyky, Buhaivka, Sosnovyi Bir, Ukraiinske, Pil'na, Shevchenkove, Shevchenkove Pershe, Vyshneve, Hontarivka, Berezhne, Tomakhivka and Seredivka.

The 244th Territorial Defense Battalion has been active since at least middle of July.

On 29 August, the brigade received its battle flag.

In October, the 11th Special Purpose Battalion was stationed near Pravdyne, and later near Snihurivka. As of 3 April 2023, the battalion was still in Kherson area.

On 19 April 2023, the Come Back Alive foundation announced that brigade had received three pick-up trucks, radios, generators, Starlink terminals and other equipment for the "Long arms of TrO" project deigned to give 120 mm mortars to those units.

== Structure ==
Battalion numbers of the Brigade. Numbers in Blue, transferred to newly formed 241st Territorial Defense Brigade

In May 2021 the brigade's structure was:

- Headquarters
- 126th Territorial Defense Battalion (Darnytskyi District) MUN А7292
- 127th Territorial Defense Battalion (Desnianskyi District) MUN А7293
- 128th Territorial Defense Battalion (Dniprovskyi District) MUN А7294
- 129th Territorial Defense Battalion (Obolonskyi District) MUN А7295
- 130th Territorial Defense Battalion (Solomianskyi District) MUN А7296
- 131st Territorial Defense Battalion (Sviatoshynskyi District) MUN А7297
- Counter-Sabotage Company
- Engineering Company
- Communication Company
- Logistics Company
- Mortar Battery

In Early 2022 the brigade's structure was:

- Headquarters
- 126th Territorial Defense Battalion (Darnytskyi District) MUN А7292
- 127th Territorial Defense Battalion (Desnianskyi District) MUN А7293
- 128th Territorial Defense Battalion (Dniprovskyi District) MUN А7294
- 129th Territorial Defense Battalion (Obolonskyi District) MUN А7295
- 130th Territorial Defense Battalion (Solomianskyi District) MUN А7296
- 131st Territorial Defense Battalion (Sviatoshynskyi District) MUN А7297
- 204th Territorial Defense Battalion (Holosiivskyi District) MUN А7373
- 205th Territorial Defense Battalion (Pecherskyi District) MUN А7374
- 206th Territorial Defense Battalion (Podilskyi District) MUN А7375
- 207th Territorial Defense Battalion (Shevchenkivskyi District) MUN А7376
- 241st Territorial Defense Battalion - became Headquarters of 241st Territorial Defense Brigade
- Counter-Sabotage Company
- Engineering Company
- Communication Company
- Logistics Company
- Mortar Battery

As of April 2022 the brigade's structure is as follows:

- Headquarters
- 126th Territorial Defense Battalion (Darnytskyi District) MUN А7292
- 127th Territorial Defense Battalion (Desnianskyi District) MUN А7293
- 128th Territorial Defense Battalion (Dniprovskyi District) MUN А7294
- 129th Territorial Defense Battalion (Obolonskyi District) MUN А7295
- 131st Territorial Defense Battalion (Sviatoshynskyi District) MUN А7297
- 244th Territorial Defense Battalion (Obolonskyi District)
- 11th Special Purpose Battalion (Kyiv) MUN А4100
- 55th Special Purpose Battalion (Brovary)
- Counter-Sabotage Company
- Engineering Company
- Communication Company
- Logistics Company
- Mortar Battery

== Commanders ==
- Lieutenant Colonel Mykola Bilosvit 2018- 2021
- Major Serhii Husachenko December 2021 (acting)
- Colonel Oleksandr Pavlii 2022–Sep 2023

Kyiv Regiment flag captured by Janusz Radziwiłł in 1651

== Insignia ==
Emblem shows a stylized bow with an arrow placed inside of golden circle, which was a part of Kyiv Regiment flag during the Cossack Hetmanate.

== See also ==
- Territorial Defense Forces of the Armed Forces of Ukraine
