= Pisky-Radkivski =

Village in Kharkiv Oblast, Ukraine

Pisky-Radkivski Піски-Радьківські
- Village
- Interactive map of Pisky-Radkivski
- Pisky-Radkivski in Kharkiv Oblast Pisky-Radkivski (Ukraine)
- Coordinates: 49.269722°N 37.619167°E
- Country: Ukraine
- Oblast: Kharkiv Oblast
- Raion: Izium Raion
- Hromada: Borova settlement hromada
- Founded: 1794

Area
  - Total: 8.533 km^{2} (3.295 sq mi)
- Elevation: 90 m (300 ft)

Population (2001 census)
  - Total: 2,507
  - Density: 293.8/km^{2} (760.9/sq mi)
- Time zone: UTC+2 (EET)
  - Summer (DST): UTC+3 (EEST)
- Postal code: 63832
- Area code: +380 5759

Pisky-Radkivski (Ukrainian: Піски-Радьківські; Russian: Пески-Радьковские) is a village in Izium Raion (district) in Kharkiv Oblast of eastern Ukraine, at about 128.5 kilometres (79.8 mi) south-east from the centre of Kharkiv city, on the eastern bank of the Oskil Reservoir.

The settlement came under attack by Russian forces during the Russian invasion of Ukraine in 2022 and was regained by Ukrainian forces by the end of September the same year.

== Demographics ==
The settlement had 2507 inhabitants in 2001, native language distribution as of the Ukrainian Census of the same year:

- Ukrainian: 91.34%
- Russian: 8.42%
- Belarusian: 0.08%
- Armenian: 0.04%
- German: 0.04%
- Moldovan (Romanian): 0.04%
