= 113th Territorial Defense Brigade =

Ukrainian 113th Territorial Defense Forces Brigade

- Ukrainian: 113-та окрема бригада територіальної оборони
- Active: 28 August 2018 - present
- Country: Ukraine
- Branch: Armed Forces of Ukraine
- Type: Military reserve force
- Role: Light infantry
- Part of: Territorial Defense Forces; Operational Command East
- Garrison/HQ: Kharkiv Oblast; MUN А7041

Insignia
- Flag

The 113th Territorial Defense Brigade (Ukrainian: 113-та окрема бригада територіальної оборони, romanized: 113-ta okrema bryhada terytorialnoi oborony) is a military formation of the Territorial Defense Forces of Ukraine in Kharkiv Oblast. It is part of Operational Command East.

== History ==
=== Formation ===
On 28 August 2018, the brigade was formed in Kharkiv Oblast. In first days brigade numbered twenty-seven people. Ten were assigned to headquarters and two in each of the five battalions. For the next ten days close to twenty-one hundred reservists and three hundred officers foot part in exercises culminating with close to thirty percent of them signing contracts with the brigade. Colonel Ihor Kiforenko became the first commander.

=== Russo-Ukrainian War ===
==== 2022 Russian invasion of Ukraine ====
At the end of January 2022 the brigade had six battalions, 120-125 requiring less than ten percent to be fully manned. A new law that took effect on 1 January allowed for two more battalions with one of them located in Kharkiv. The brigade took part in battles for Kharkiv and Bakhmut.

The brigade had taken part in defensive operations for about four months before participating in the major Ukrainian offensive in the Kharkiv Oblast in September 2022.

On 10 September 2022, Ukrainian president Volodymyr Zelenskyy announced that the 113th Territorial Defense Brigade was responsible for capturing the villages of Vasylenkove and Artemivka during a Ukrainian counteroffensive in the Kharkiv Oblast. According to Gerasim Gevorgian, commander of the brigade's 120th Battalion, the brigade captured about fifty settlements in total during this offensive. The Chuhuiv Battalion of the 113th Brigade was involved in the counteroffensive, taking part in combat near Vasylenkove, and advancing for five days until reaching the Russia-Ukraine border near Vovchansk. Many members of the battalion were locals and had relatives living in the areas which they recaptured.

== Structure ==
As of 2022 the brigade's structure is as follows:

- Headquarters
- 120th Territorial Defense Battalion (Derhachi) MUN А7286
- 121st Territorial Defense Battalion (Zmiiv) MUN А7287
- 122nd Territorial Defense Battalion (Izium) MUN А7288
- 123rd Territorial Defense Battalion (Kupiansk) MUN А7289
- 124th Territorial Defense Battalion (Lozova) MUN А7290
- 125th Territorial Defense Battalion (Chuhuiv) MUN А7291
- 209th Territorial Defense Battalion (Bohodukhiv) MUN А7378
- Engineering Company
- Communication Company
- Logistics Company
- Mortar Battery

== Commanders ==
- Lieutenant Colonel Ihor Kiforenko 2018–2020
- Lieutenant Colonel Andrii Borodin 2020–2021
- Colonel Yevhen Zadorozhnyi 2021–present

== See also ==
- Territorial Defense Forces of the Armed Forces of Ukraine
