= 128th Heavy Mechanized Brigade =

Ukrainian Territorial Defense Forces unit

128th Territorial Defense Brigade
- Ukrainian: 128-ма окрема бригада територіальної оборони "Дике поле"
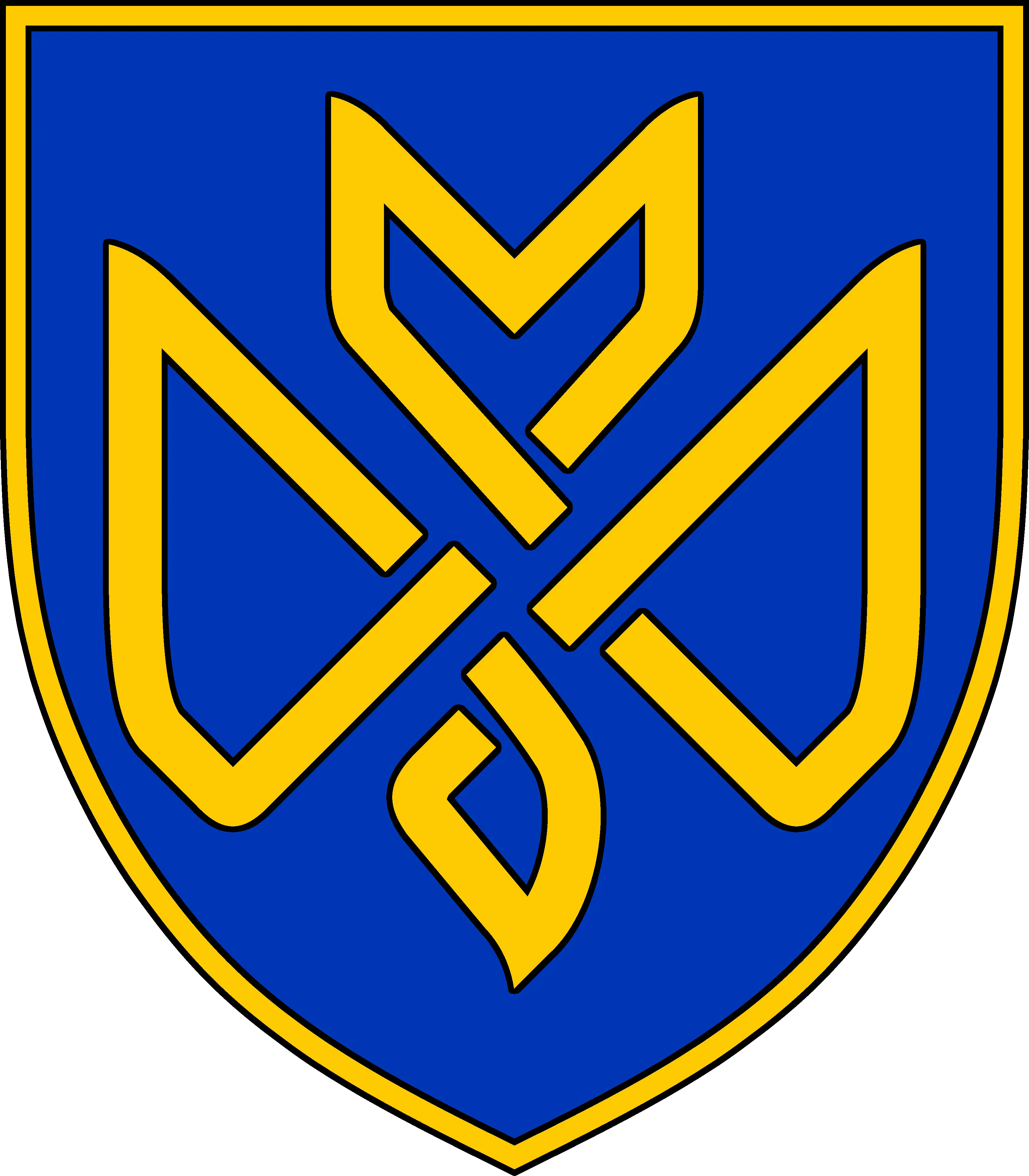
- Active: 26 February 2022 – present
- Country: Ukraine
- Branch: Armed Forces of Ukraine
- Role: Mechanized Infantry
- Part of: Operational Command East
- Garrison/HQ: Dnipro; MUN А7384
- Engagements: Russo-Ukrainian war: Russian invasion of Ukraine

Insignia
- Flag

The 128th Heavy Mechanized Brigade "Wild Field" (Ukrainian: 128-ма окрема бригада територіальної оборони «Дике поле») is a military formation of the Ukrainian Ground Forces in Dnipro. It is part of Operational Command East.

== History ==
=== Formation ===
On 16 February 2022 Chief of Staff for Regional Territorial Defense Command of Operational Command East Yevhen Shcherban announced that a second brigade dedicated to defense of Dnipro will be created. Command of the unit was offered to Colonel Oleksandr Vodolazskyi on the 25th. Next day, 26 February the brigade was formed and began recruiting. 700 Soldiers signed up on the first day from over 3,000 who showed up.

=== Russo-Ukrainian War ===
==== 2022 Russian invasion of Ukraine ====
Soldiers from 231st Defense Battalion shot down a Mi-35M on 6 June in Donetsk Oblast. By August battalions of the brigade were dispersed in various parts of the front.

On 8 September 2022, the brigade's 233rd Battalion took control of the village of Vovchyi Yar in the Kharkiv Oblast as part of a major Ukrainian operation there. Two days later, the 233rd took part in the capture of the Kharkiv Oblast villages of Bohodarivka and Semenivka.

On 14 October, the brigade received its battle flag.

Brigade commander Colonel Oleksandr Vodolazskyi received orders to retire due to his age on 22 February 2023. Colonel Rostyslav Rehinskyi became a new commander on 27 February 2023.

On 3 March President Volodymyr Zelenskyy stated that the brigade was fighting in Zaporizhzhia Oblast. In July, the brigade was fighting in Donetsk Oblast.

On 5 December 2024, the brigade was awarded the honorary name "Wild Field" by decree of President Volodymyr Zelenskyy.

In 2024, the brigade was transferred to the Ground Forces of Ukraine, and in July 2025 reformed into a heavy mechanized brigade.

== Structure ==
As of 2022 the brigade's structure is as follows:

- Headquarters
- 230th Territorial Defense Battalion MUN А7405
- 231st Territorial Defense Battalion MUN А7406
- 232nd Territorial Defense Battalion MUN А7407
- 233rd Territorial Defense Battalion MUN А7408
- 234th Territorial Defense Battalion MUN А7409
- Engineering Company
- Communication Company
- Logistics Company
- Mortar Battery

== Commanders ==
- Colonel Oleksandr Vodolazskyi 26 February 2022 – 27 February 2023
- Colonel Rostyslav Rehinskyi 27 February 2023 – present

== See also ==
- Territorial Defense Forces of the Armed Forces of Ukraine
