= Yatskivka =

Village in Donetsk Oblast, Ukraine

Yatskivka Яцьківка
- Village
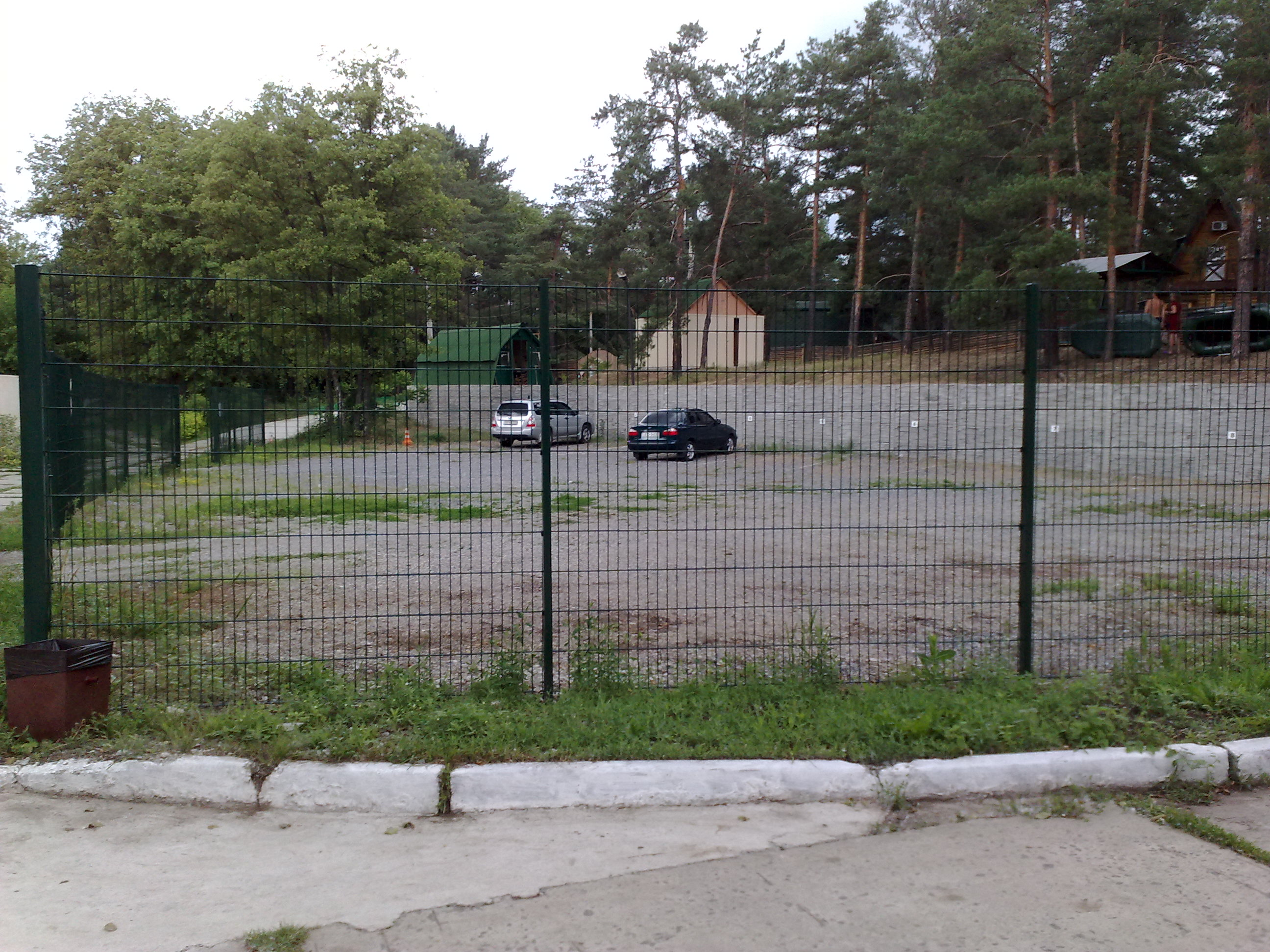
- Interactive map of Yatskivka
- Yatskivka in Donetsk Oblast Yatskivka (Ukraine)
- Coordinates: 49.174722°N 37.535°E
- Country: Ukraine
- Oblast: Donetsk Oblast
- Raion: Kramatorsk Raion

Area
  - Total: 2.09 km^{2} (0.81 sq mi)
- Elevation: 100 m (330 ft)

Population (2001 census)
  - Total: 490
  - Estimate (2019): 443
  - Density: 230/km^{2} (610/sq mi)
- Time zone: UTC+2 (EET)
  - Summer (DST): UTC+3 (EEST)
- Postal code: 84410
- Area code: +380 6261
- KATOTTH: UA14120110360079412

Yatskivka (Ukrainian: Яцьківка; Russian: Яцковка) is a village in Kramatorsk Raion in Donetsk Oblast of eastern Ukraine.

The village is located near the southern corner of the Oskil Reservoir.

== History ==
=== Russian invasion of Ukraine ===
The village came under attack by Russian forces in 2022, during the Russian invasion of Ukraine. It was recaptured by Ukrainian forces on 23 September 2022, during the 2022 Kharkiv counteroffensive.

== Local government ==
It belongs to Lyman urban hromada, one of the hromadas of Ukraine.
