= Oskil Dam =

Dam and power plant in Kharkiv, Ukraine

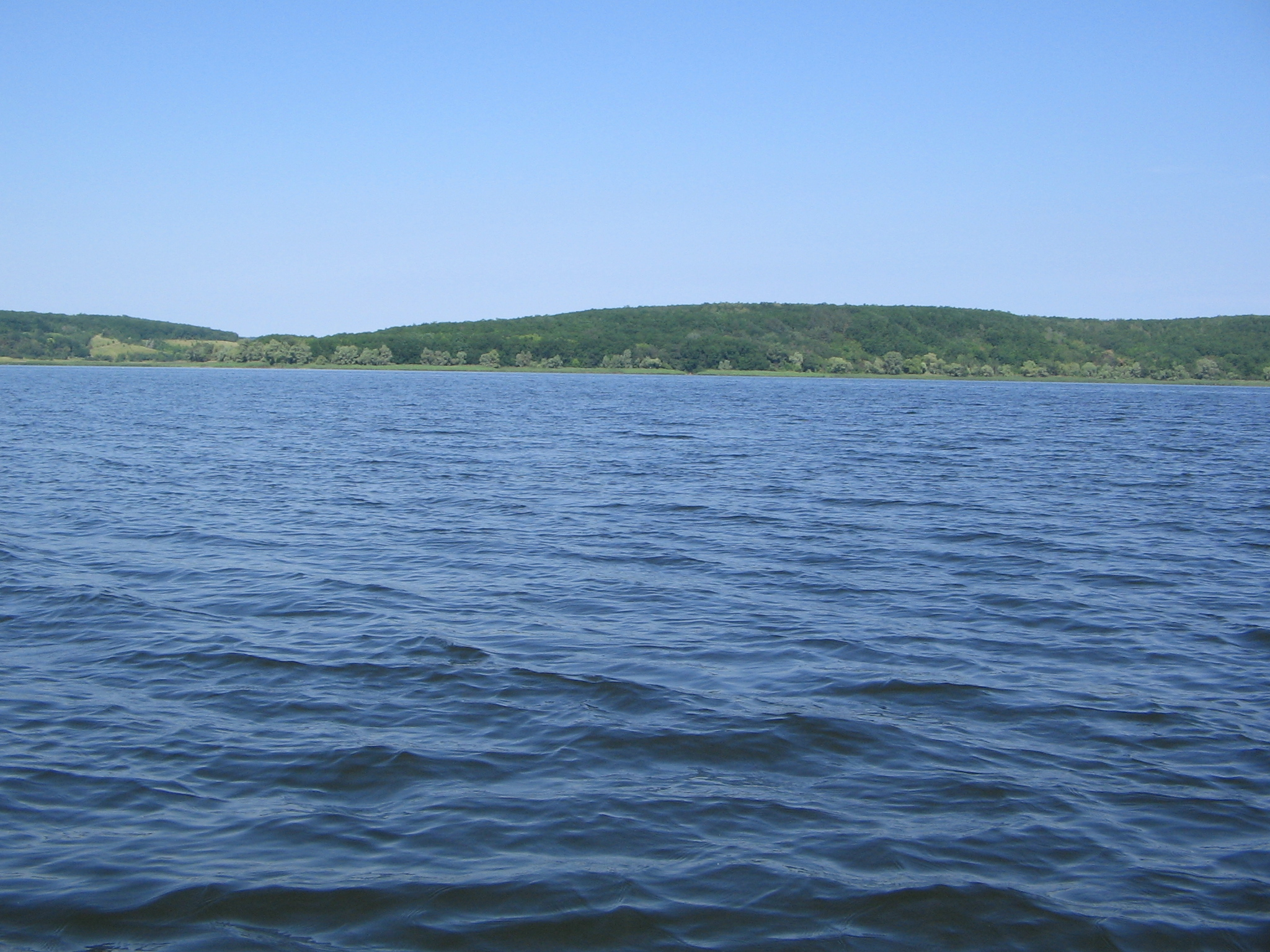
- The Oskil Reservoir that the dam created

- Location within Kharkiv Oblast Location within Ukraine
- Location: Oskil, Ukraine
- Coordinates: 49°10′30″N 37°28′19″E
- Purpose: Power, irrigation
- Status: Destroyed
- Construction began: 1954
- Opening date: 1958; 68 years ago
- Demolition date: April 2, 2022
- Owner: Water of Donbas

Dam and spillways
- Type of dam: Earth-fill embankment with gravity sections
- Impounds: Oskil River
- Length: 1,025 m (3,363 ft)

Reservoir
- Creates: Oskil Reservoir
- Total capacity: 474×10^{6} m^{3} (384,278 acre⋅ft)
- Surface area: 130 km^{2} (50 mi^{2})

Power Station
- Turbines: 2 × 1,840 kW
- Installed capacity: 3,680 kW
- Annual generation: 15 million kWh

The Oskil Dam (Ukrainian: Оскільська ГЕС), also known as the Oskil Hydroelectric Station, is a former hydroelectric plant in Eastern Ukraine along the Oskil River. The plant first began operation in 1958, and was destroyed on April 2, 2022, during the Russo-Ukrainian War.

== History ==
During the 1950s, the Soviets began to plan for the construction of a series of infrastructure projects to alleviate the water shortage surrounding the Siverskyi Donets. They decided on the construction of the Siverskyi Donets – Donbas Canal and the Oskil Dam.

The construction of dam first began in 1954, and was completed by 1956. The construction for the power plant soon also completed by 1957, and both began operation in 1958. Since then, the dam has created the Oskil Reservoir as a water source for the local population.

On April 2, 2022, during the Russo-Ukrainian War, the power plant was destroyed as a result of Russian shelling. This destruction caused the water from the reservoir to create flooding in the downstream areas. The cost of the flooding is estimated to be about 3 million Hryvnias.

== Characteristics ==
The Hydroelectric plant is located on the Oskil River, near the town of Oskil. The dam is 1,025m long and 20m wide. The power plant contains the engine room, which is located on the right bank of the river, and also has 2 turbines to generate electricity. Each turbine generates 1,840 kW, making the total capacity of the plant to be 3,680 kW. The average annual electrical production is about 15 million kWh, which increased to 20 million kWh after some modernization efforts. The power plant was operated under the "Donbass Water Company" during its period of operation.

== See also ==
- Kakhovka Dam
- Dnipro Hydroelectric Station
- Hydroelectricity in Ukraine
