= Taras Berezovets =

Ukrainian journalist

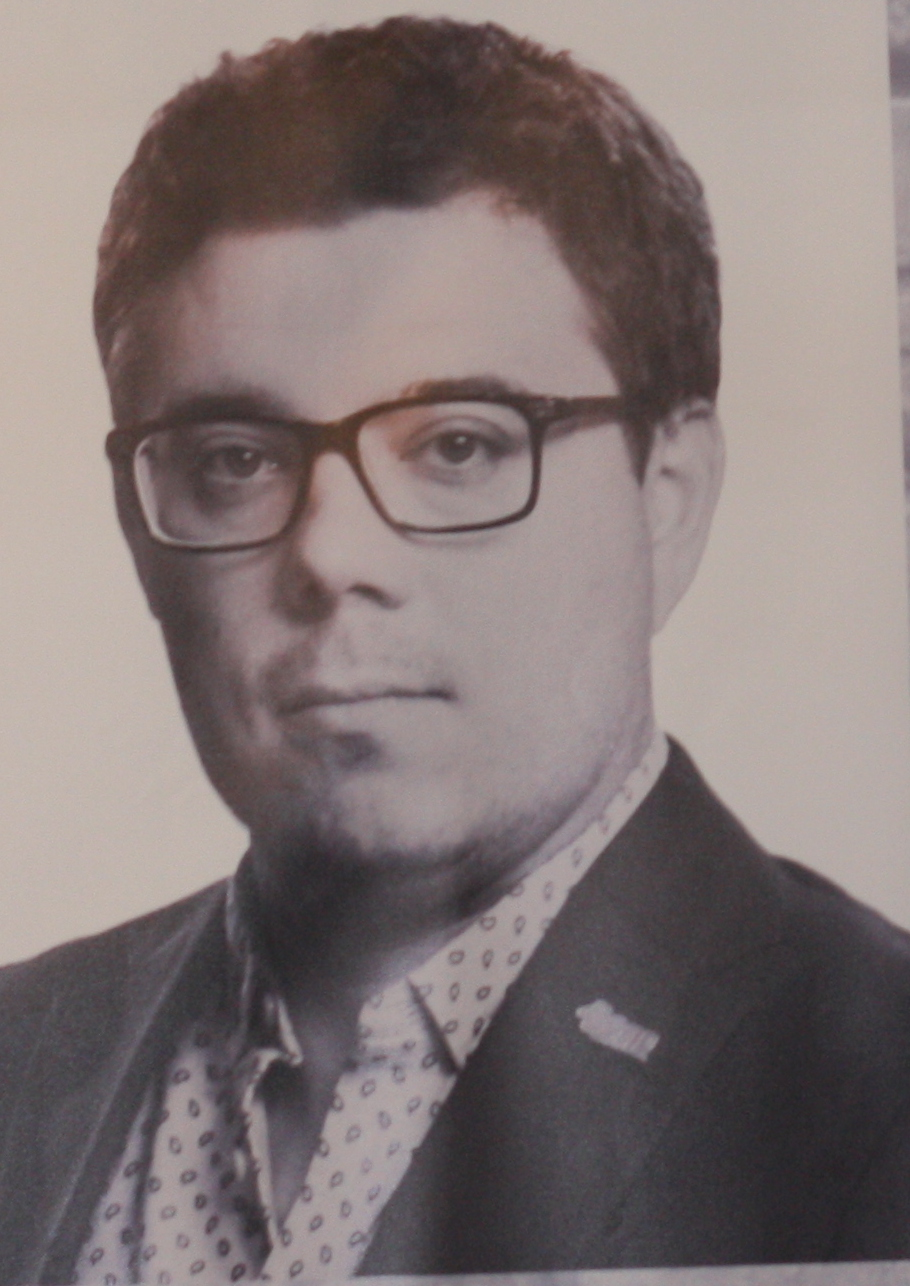
Forum vydavtsiv 2017

Taras Valeriyovych Berezovets (Ukrainian: Тарас Валерійович Березовець) (born 1 March 1975) is a Ukrainian political analyst, founder of Free Сrimea project (2014), CEO of the Fund for National Strategies (2015), founder of Hybrid Warfare Resistance Bureau (2015), co-founder of the Ukrainian Institute for the Future (2016), external advisor to the Secretary of the National Security and Defence Council of Ukraine (2016–present) and native of Kerch city.

== Biography ==
Berezovets was born on 1 March 1975 in Kerch and in 1982–1987 studied in the school No.12.

In 1992, he graduated the local Korolenko gymnasium.

In 1997, Berezovets finished the Journalism Faculty of Kyiv University.

In 2003, he graduated from the Royal College of Defence Studies (London, UK), becoming the youngest member in RCDS's history. In 2004 he received MA in International Studies from King's College London.

In 2011, Berezovets was selected to represent Ukraine among young leaders from Central and Eastern Europe in the prestigious John Smith Memorial Trust Programme (UK).

In 2016, he was selected to take part in the Aspen Programme.

During his professional career since 1997 Berezovets has occupied a number of high-level positions. Thus, in 1997–98 as press secretary to the permanent representative of Ukraine's president in the Ukrainian parliament.

From 1998 to 2005, he worked as an expert at the National Security and Defence Council of Ukraine. During his career in the national security field his main focuses were NATO and Russia. In 2006-2010 he worked as PR advisor to then Prime minister Yulia Tymoshenko.

In 2010, Berezovets started his own consulting business, Berta Communications PLC. Today it is one of Ukraine's leading strategic consulting agencies providing services in political consulting, lobbying, PR and analytical support.

In December 2014, he launched the Free Crimea (FC) project, targeting human rights violations in Crimea by Russian Federation, helping create independent media for Crimea and establishing Ukraine's national security strategy regarding the Crimean question .

In 2016, Berezovets became a TV host at the Chernomorka TV station with Free Crimea show, broadcasting to the Russia-controlled peninsula.

In April 2017, he started hosting his own TV show, Political accents, on Channel 24. In June 2017 Berezovets joined the team of Pryamyi TV channel as a TV host of show Sytuatsiya and The Week (last one along with US analyst Peter Zalmayev).

== Published books ==
- Annexation: island Crimea (facebook page)

In 2015, he wrote a book titled Annexation: Island of Crimea. Chronicles of the hybrid warfare (it became a best-seller in Ukraine and currently an English translation is being prepared).

In May 2015, Berezovets presented a white paper at the European Parliament, titled "Black book of occupation of Crimea" - a first of its kind which detailed the situation with human rights, militarization and economic situation on the peninsula.

In November 2016, Berezovets spoke at a congressional hearing in Washington on the situation in Crimea.

== Awards ==
- Commemorative medal "25 years of independence of Ukraine" (2016)
