= Khotimlya, Russia =

Khotimlya Хотимля
- Village
- Location within Bashkortostan Location within Russia
- Coordinates: 54°08′N 55°23′E
- Country: Russia
- Region: Bashkortostan
- District: Davlekanovsky District
- Time zone: UTC+5:00

Khotimlya (Russian: Хотимля) is a rural locality (a village) in Bik-Karmalinsky Selsoviet, Davlekanovsky District, Bashkortostan, Russia. The population was 221 as of 2010. There are 2 streets.

== Geography ==
Khotimlya is located 28 km southeast of Davlekanovo (the district's administrative centre) by road. Iskandarovo is the nearest rural locality.
