= Podoly =

Village in Kharkiv Oblast, Ukraine

Podoly Подоли
- Village
- Interactive map of Podoly
- Location of Yehorivka in Kharkiv Oblast Podoly (Kharkiv Oblast)
- Coordinates: 49.69°N 37.666111°E
- Country: Ukraine
- Oblast: Kharkiv Oblast
- Raion: Kupiansk Raion
- Founded: 1918

Area
  - Total: 3.08 km^{2} (1.19 sq mi)
- Elevation: 98 m (322 ft)

Population (2001 census)
  - Total: 2,378
  - Density: 772/km^{2} (2,000/sq mi)
- Time zone: UTC+2 (EET)
  - Summer (DST): UTC+3 (EEST)
- Postal code: 63751
- Area code: +380 5742

Podoly (Ukrainian: Подоли; Russian: Подолы) is a village in Kupiansk Raion (district) in Kharkiv Oblast of eastern Ukraine, at about 109.34 kilometres (67.94 mi) southeast by east (SEbE) from the centre of Kharkiv city. Podoly is located some kilometres south-east of Kupiansk and about two kilometres east of Oskil river.
