= Iziumske =

Village in Kharkiv Oblast, Ukraine

Iziumske Ізюмське
- Location of Iziumske Iziumske (Ukraine)
- Coordinates: 49°16′09″N 37°48′39″E
- Country: Ukraine
- Oblast: Kharkiv Oblast
- Raion: Izium Raion

Population (2001)
  - Total: 694
- Postal code: 63840
- Climate: Cfa

Iziumske (Ukrainian: Ізюмське) is a village in Izium Raion, Kharkiv Oblast (province) of Ukraine.

Iziumske was previously located in the Borova Raion. The raion was abolished on 18 July 2020 as part of the administrative reform of Ukraine, which reduced the number of raions of Kharkiv Oblast to seven. The area of Borova Raion was merged into Izium Raion.
