= Oskil Reservoir =

Drained reservoir in Kharkiv Oblast, Ukraine

Oskol Reservoir
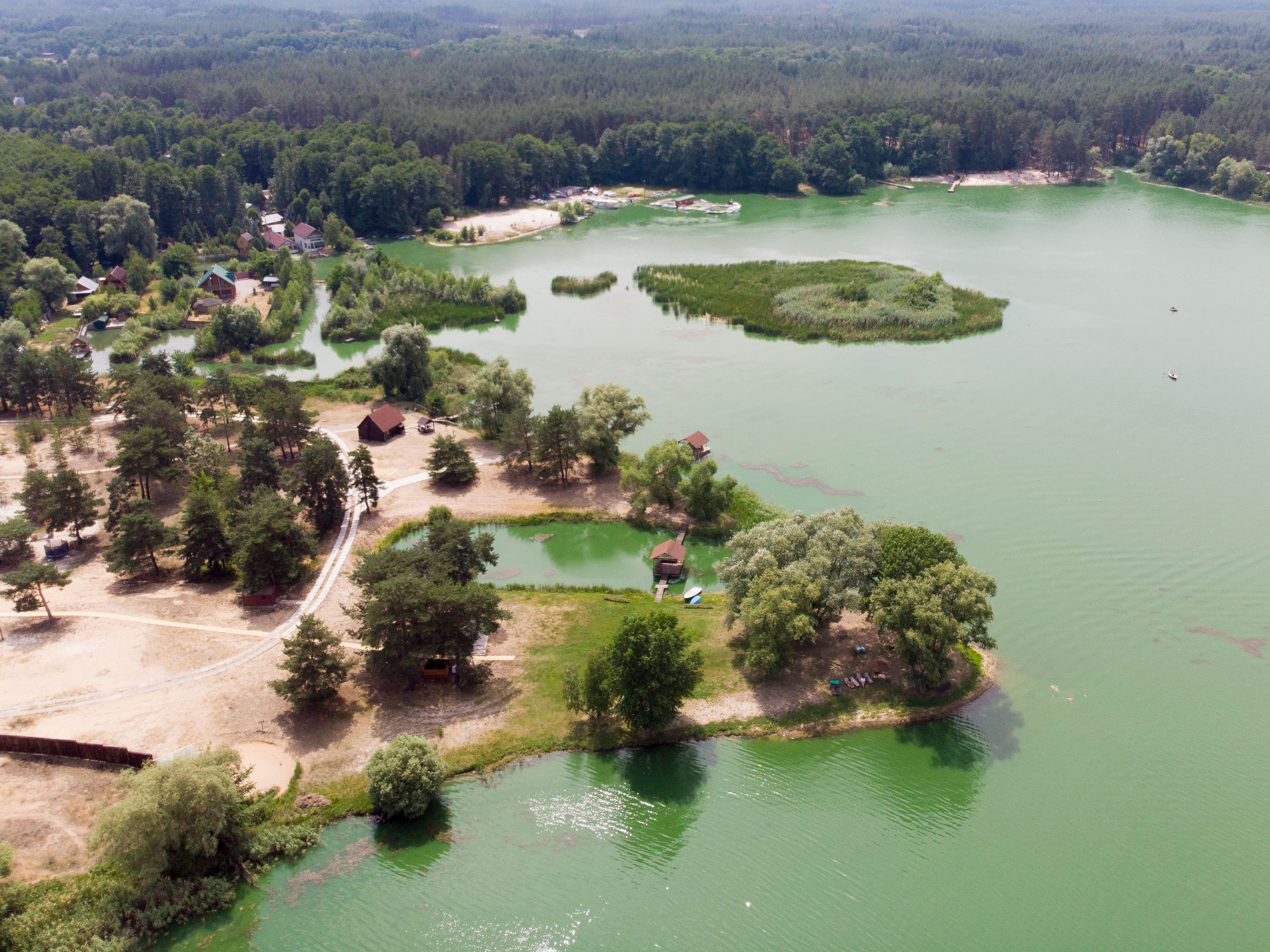
- The village of Yatskivka on the reservoir in 2019

- Location within Kharkiv Oblast
- Interactive map of Oskol Reservoir
- Location: Kharkiv Oblast
- Coordinates: 49°17′34″N 37°34′16″E
- Type: reservoir
- Primary inflows: Oskil River
- Primary outflows: Oskil River
- Basin countries: Ukraine
- Max. length: 125 km (78 mi) (before destruction)
- Max. width: 4 km (2.5 mi) (before destruction)
- Surface area: 130 km^{2} (50 sq mi) (before destruction)
- Average depth: 4 m (13 ft) (before destruction)
- Water volume: 474 hm^{3} (384,000 acre⋅ft) (before destruction)

The Oskil Reservoir (Ukrainian: Оскільське водосховище; Russian: Оскольское водохранилище, sometimes translated as Oskol or Oskilske) was an artificial lake on the Oskil River in Kharkiv Oblast, Ukraine. It was formerly known as the Chervonyi-Oskil Reservoir.

The reservoir was opened in 1958. Before it was drained, the reservoir's area was 130 km², with a maximal length of 125 km, a maximal width of 4 km, an average depth of 4 m and a volume of approximately 474 hm³. The purpose of the reservoir was to regulate water levels, to serve as a source for electricity, and to help the fishing industry.

== Destruction ==
During the 2022 Russian invasion of Ukraine, the reservoir was noted for its strategic importance, as causing downstream flooding would be one way to slow Russian advances in the Donbas.

In July 2022, Russian shelling destroyed the reservoir's Oskil Dam, draining its level to one-sixth that of its pre-war size. The loss of water from the reservoir caused significant environmental damage, including the deaths of millions of fish and other endangered species.
