= 43rd Artillery Brigade (Ukraine) =

Ukrainian Ground Forces unit

43rd Artillery Brigade "Hetman Taras Triasylo"
- Ukrainian: 43-тя окрема артилерійська бригада імені гетьмана Тараса Трясила
- Current insignia of the brigade
- Active: 2 May 2015 – present
- Country: Ukraine
- Branch: Ukrainian Ground Forces
- Type: Rocket and Artillery Forces
- Role: Artillery
- Size: Brigade
- Garrison/HQ: Divychky
- Patron: Taras Triasylo
- Motto(s): "Fighting, not complaining"
- Engagements: Russo-Ukrainian War; War in Donbas; Russian invasion of Ukraine
- Decorations: For Courage and Bravery

Commanders
- Current commander: Oleh Shevchuk

Insignia
- Field Insignia

The 43rd Artillery Brigade "Hetman Taras Triasylo" (Ukrainian: 43-тя окрема артилерійська бригада імені гетьмана Тараса Трясила) is a unit of the Ground Forces in Divychky. On 14 October 2020 by presidential decree the brigade was assigned the honorary name "named after Hetman Taras Triasylo", a hetman of the Zaporizhian Cossacks. On 3 November 2022, the brigade was awarded the honorary award "For Courage and Bravery" by President Volodymyr Zelenskyy.

== Structure ==
As of 2025, the 43rd Artillery Brigade's known structure is as follows:

- 43rd Artillery Brigade
  - Brigade Headquarters
    - Management
    - Commandant Platoon
  - 1st Artillery Battalion
  - 2nd Artillery Battalion
  - 3rd Artillery Battalion
  - 4th Artillery Battalion
  - Rocket Artillery Battalion
  - 191st Self-propelled Artillery Battalion (2S7 Pion)
  - 209th Anti-tank Artillery Battalion (MT-12 Rapira)
  - Artillery Reconnaissance Battalion
  - Engineer Company
  - Maintenance Company
  - Logistic Company
  - Signal Company
  - Radar Company
  - Medical Company
  - CBRN Protection Company
  - Guards Battalion

== Equipment ==
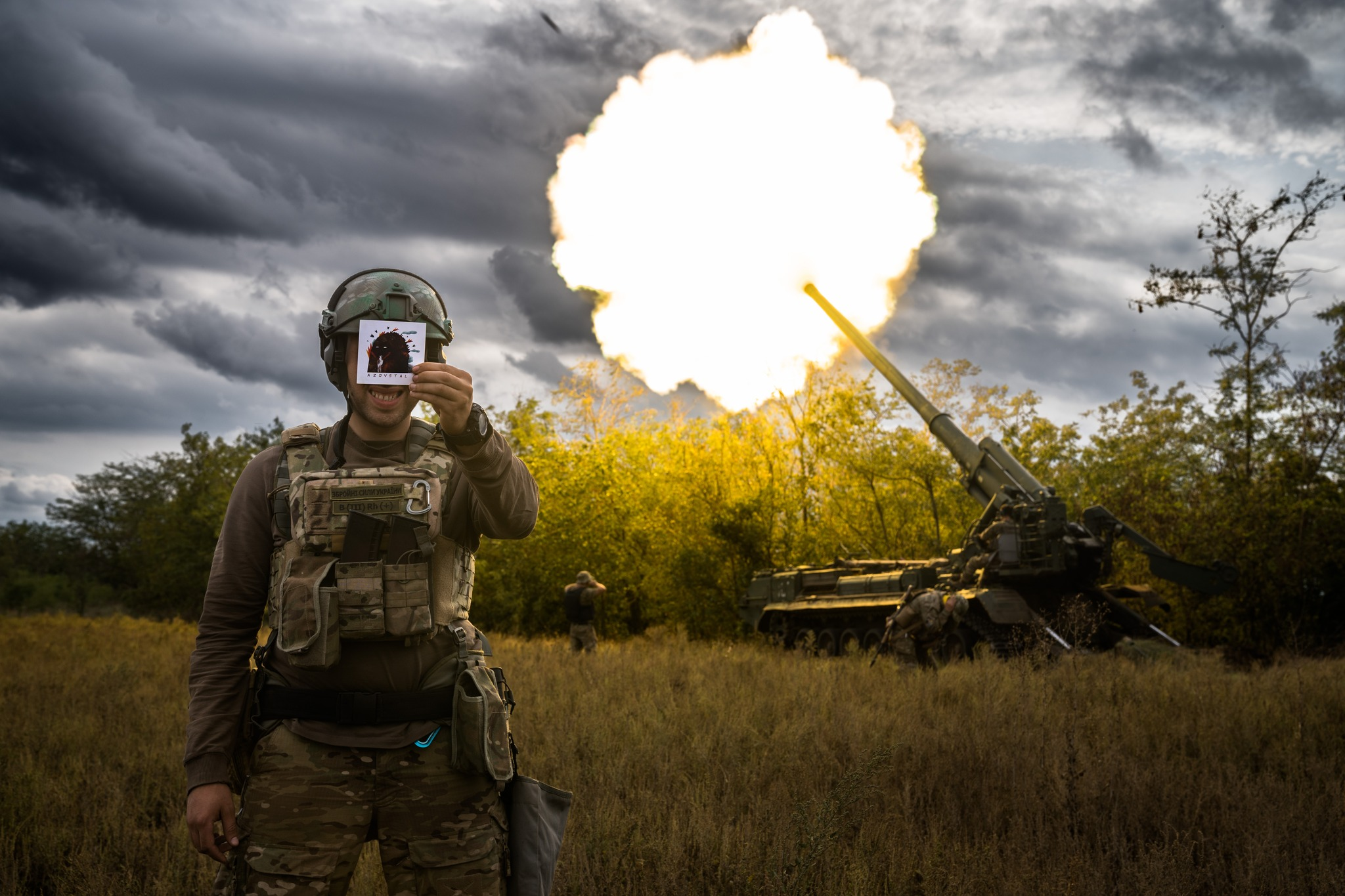
A 2S7 Pion of the 43rd Artillery Brigade fires at Russian positions.

The brigade is the only Ukrainian unit in the Ukrainian Ground Forces to operate 2S7 Pion and PzH 2000 artillery systems. The brigade is also the second unit in the Ground Forces to receive Archer artillery systems.

=== Artillery ===
- 2S7 Pion – Soviet self-propelled artillery
- Archer – Swedish wheeled self-propelled howitzer
- MT-12 – Soviet Anti-tank Gun
- PzH 2000 – German self-propelled howitzer

=== Vehicles ===
- MT-LBu – Soviet armored transporter

== Gallery ==
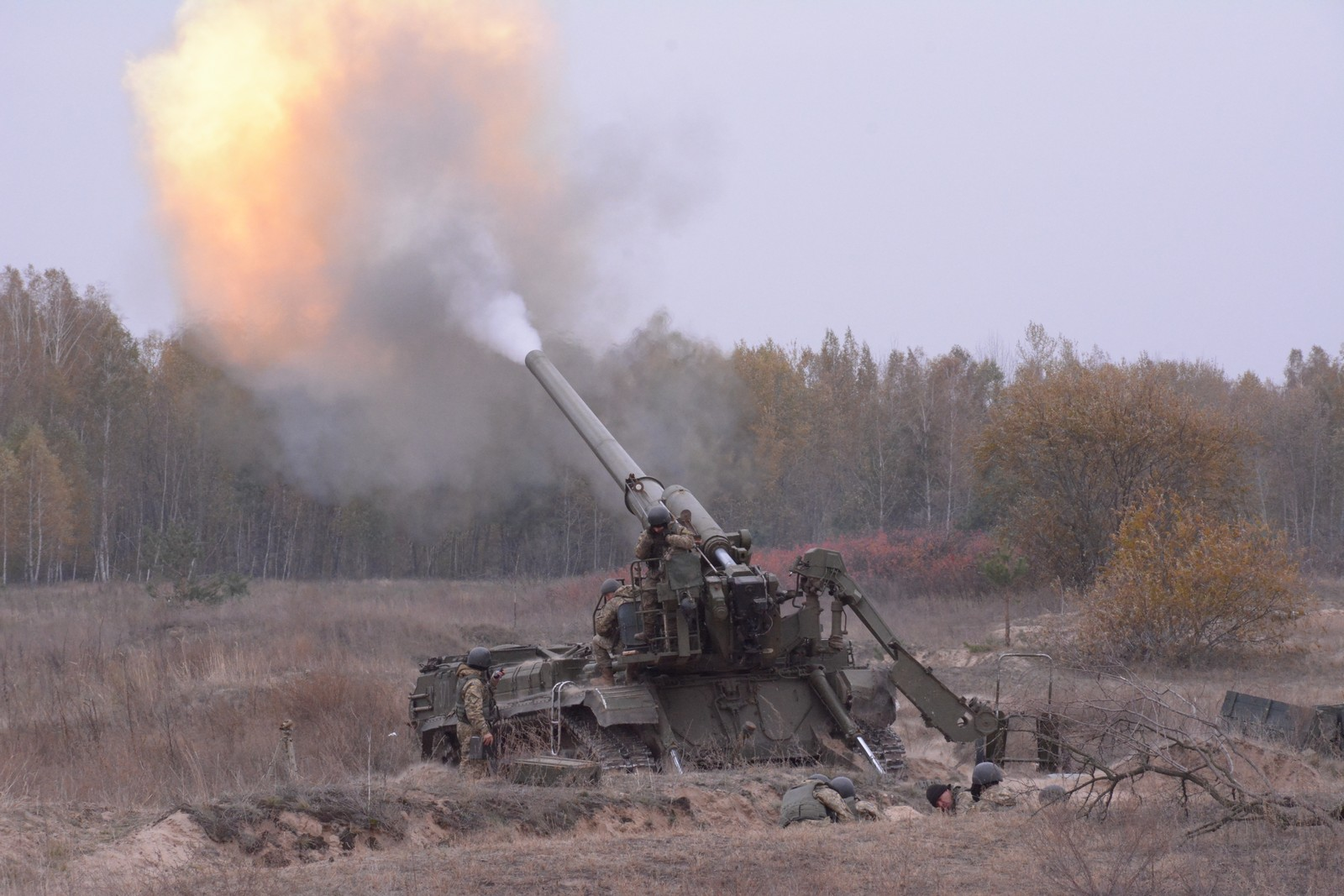
Artillery units conduct live fire exercises at Divychky Training Ground, Kyiv Oblast.

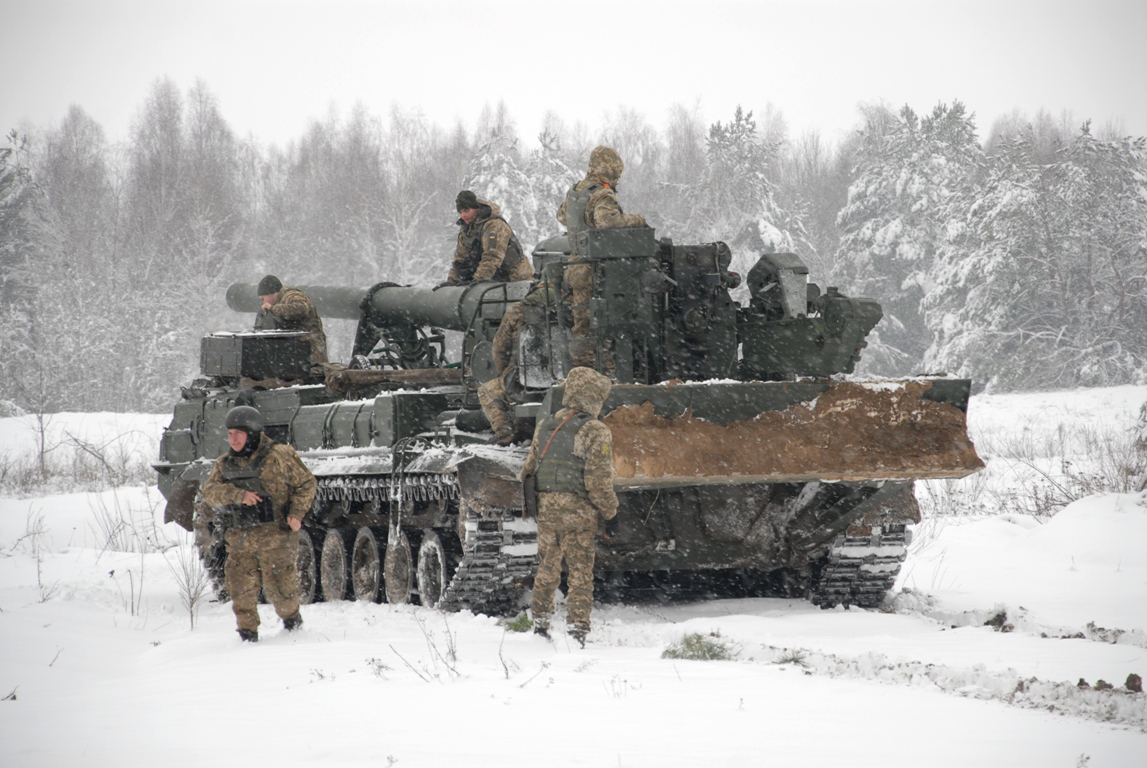
Artillery operators of the Ground Forces being trained in 2017.

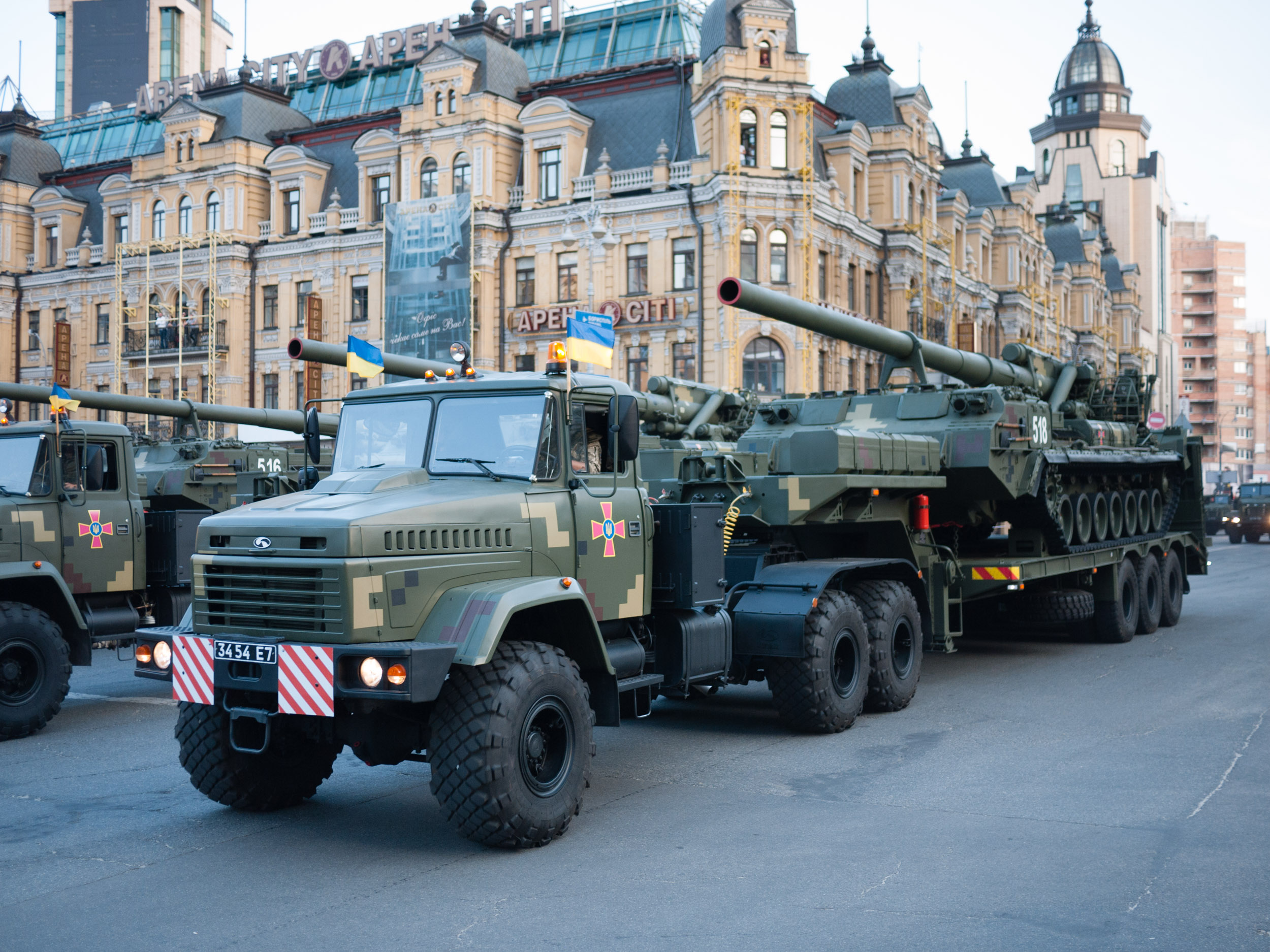
A 2S7 Pion of the brigade at a military parade in 2018.
