= Shevchenkove =

Shevchenkove is a name of several populated places in Ukraine.

It may refer to:

- Shevchenkove, Shevchenkove rural hromada, Mykolaiv Raion, Mykolaiv Oblast, a village in Shevchenkove rural hromada, Mykolaiv Raion
- Shevchenkove, Shevchenkove settlement hromada, Kupiansk Raion, Kharkiv Oblast, an urban settlement in the Kharkiv Oblast
- Shevchenkove, Brovary Raion, Kyiv Oblast, a village in Kyiv Oblast
- Shevchenkove, Izmail Raion, Odesa Oblast
- About 60 other villages across Ukraine
- A small hamlet in the Vinnytsia Oblast
