= Khotimlia, Ukraine =

Village in Kharkiv Oblast, Ukraine

Khotimlia Хотімля
- Village
- Interactive map of Khotimlia
- Location of Khotimlya within Ukraine Khotimlia (Ukraine)
- Coordinates: 50.022778°N 36.875833°E
- Country: Ukraine
- Oblast: Kharkiv Oblast
- District: Chuhuiv Raion
- Founded: 1695

Area
  - Total: 3.092 km^{2} (1.194 sq mi)
- Elevation: 108 m (354 ft)

Population (2001 census)
  - Total: 1,351
  - Density: 436.9/km^{2} (1,132/sq mi)
- Time zone: UTC+2 (EET)
  - Summer (DST): UTC+3 (EEST)
- Postal code: 62572
- Area code: +380 5741

Khotimlia (Ukrainian: Хотімля; Russian: Хотомля) is a village in Chuhuiv Raion of Kharkiv Oblast in southern Ukraine, about 46.3 kilometres (28.8 mi) EbN from the centre of Kharkiv city.

The settlement came under Russian occupation on 24 February 2022, the first day of the Russian invasion of Ukraine.

In June 2022, pro-Russian Telegram channels reported that Ukrainian engineering units were operating in the area of Khotimlia, but had not established control over the area. The Institute for the Study of War noted that there was no evidence that Ukrainian forces had crossed the Pechenihy Reservoir.

Khotimlia was captured by Ukrainian forces in September 2022, amid a counteroffensive in the Kharkiv Oblast. Sources differ on whether the village was retaken on 10 September or 15 September.
