= Bila (tributary of Seret) =

River in Ternopil Oblast, Ukraine

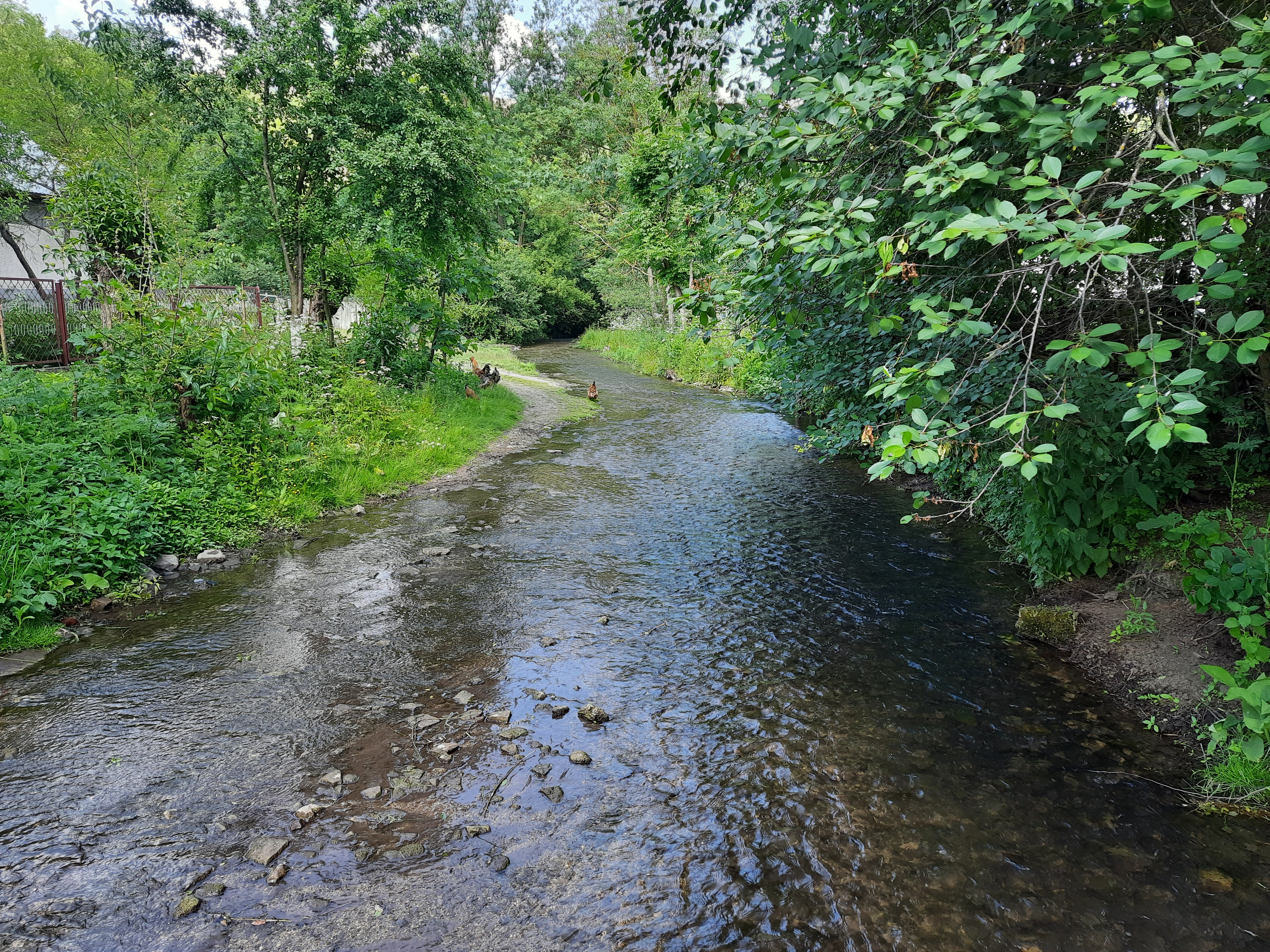
- Bila River near Bilyi Potik
- Native name: Біла (Ukrainian)

Location
- Country: Ukraine

Physical characteristics
- Source
  - location: near Kosiv
- Mouth: Seret
- Length: 26 km (16 mi)

Basin features
- Progression: Dniester→ Dniester Estuary→ Black Sea

Bila, also Mlynivka (Ukrainian: Біла) is a river in Ukraine, which flows within the Chortkiv Raion of Ternopil Oblast. Right tributary of the river Seret from the Dniester basin.

It is 26 km long and covers an area of 92,2 km^{2}. Formed from several sources in the western part of Kosiv.

== Sources ==
- (in Ukrainian) Ternopil Oblast. History of cities and villages: in 3 v. / Ternopil: "Terno-graph", 2014, V. 3: М—Ш, 608 s. — ISBN 978-966-457-246-7.
- Словник гідронімів України — К.: Наукова думка, 1979. — S. 53 (Біла № 21).
