= Wasyl Didiuk =

Ukrainian journalist, writer, humorist (1915–2003)

- Василь Степанович Дідюк
- Born: 8 February 1915; Kryvoluka, Austria-Hungary (now Ukraine)
- Died: 15 September 2003 (aged 88); Toronto, Canada
- Other names: V. Stepanovych, Didenko, V. Vyshyvanyi, Sivach, V. D., V. D-iukta
- Occupations: Public and political figure, journalist, writer, humorist, satirist, and editor

Wasyl Didiuk or Vasyl Didiuk (Ukrainian: Василь Степанович Дідюк; 8 February 1915 – 15 September 2003) was a Ukrainian public and political figure, journalist, writer, humorist, satirist, and editor.

== Biography ==
Vasyl Didiuk was born on 8 February 1915 in the village of Kryvoluka, now the Bilobozhnytsia Hromada in the Chortkiv Raion of the Ternopil Oblast of Ukraine.

He studied at the Chortkiv Gymnasium and the Buchach Teachers' Seminary; he studied theology in Stanyslaviv, graduated from the Higher School of Political Science, Ukrainian Economic and Technical Institute in Poděbrady (now the Czech Republic).

He sang and conducted with the Dmytro Kotko Choir. He was active in organizing and directing church and secular choirs. During the German occupation, he was imprisoned in Chortkiv prison for 14 months (from October 1941), from which he escaped. Then he worked in the department of propaganda and political education of the Ukrainian Insurgent Army, was the editor of the newspaper Upivski Visti and others.

Before the end of World War II, he moved to Germany to the city of Goslar, which was then in the British occupation zone, on behalf of the Organization of Ukrainian Nationalists. He worked as a deputy chairman and cultural and educational advisor to the Ukrainian Red Cross. He also founded the "Ridna Shkola" society, Ukrainian studies courses, and a gymnasium where he taught. At the same time, he conducted choirs and prepared amateur performances. He was the editor of the Taborovyi biuleten, the newspapers Taborove zhyttia, and Ukrainskyi Skytalets. District liaison of the League of Ukrainian Political Prisoners in Germany.

In 1948, he emigrated to Canada, where he organized and taught in schools in Canadian cities. In 1985–1991, he worked as director of the Ridna School Society and Ukrainian Studies courses in Etobicoke. He was a school inspector with the Ukrainian Canadian Congress. Regional organizer of the Ukrainian Youth Association, secretary of the UPA Society. Chairman of the Ukrainian Journalists' Union of Canada, member of the Presidium, and press officer of the Ukrainian Canadian Congress. Chair of the Toronto chapter of the Ukrainian Catholic Brotherhood of Canada, Secretary General of the Ukrainian Catholic Brotherhood of Canada, member of the Presidium of the World Congress of Free Ukrainians, Chief Advisor to the Government of the Ukrainian People's Union, the Union of Ukrainian Youth, the League of Ukrainian Political Prisoners, Chair of the Toronto Association of Ukrainian Educators, Secretary of the Association of Ukrainian Cultural Figures, Secretary General of the Ukrainian Liberation League, Secretary General of the World Ukrainian Liberation Front, President of the World Federation of Ukrainian Journalists.

From 1991 he came to Ukraine, in particular to Ternopil Oblast.

He died on 15 September 2003 in Toronto. Together with his wife, Lina Vavryk, he was buried at St. Volodymyr Ukrainian Cemetery in Oakville, Canada.

== Works ==
He is the author of more than 1000 articles, poems, essays, short stories, reviews, and reports in the press, calendars, and almanacs.

Books:

- "Україна — мій рідний край" (1963);
- "Чому я українець?" (1964);
- "На народній ниві" (vol. 1, 1982; vol. 2, 1985);
- "Смійтеся на здоров'я" (vol. 1, 1988; vol. 2, 1991; vol. 3, 1994);
- "Подорож по рідному краю" (1995);
- "ОУН-УПА в боротьбі за незалежність України" (1996).

Editor of the Ukrainskyi Zhurnalist and a number of books. In 1963, he founded the Ovyd Publishing House, where he published brochures for Ukrainian studies courses and the economic and business monthly "Problemy". He was a co-editor of the newspaper "Homin Ukrainy", and from 1965 he contributed to the American newspaper "Svoboda".

The State Archives of the Ternopil Oblast created the Wasyl Didiuk Fund, to which he donated more than 2,000 books and periodicals from his own library.

== Awards ==
- Taras Shevchenko Gold Medal of the Ukrainian Canadian Congress (1983);
- medals of the UPA marching groups and the Ontario government;
- Cross of Merit of the Free Cossacks;
- Certificates of Honor from the Ukrainian Canadian Congress, the Ukrainian Liberation League, and the Ukrainian Catholic Brotherhood of Canada;
- Certificate of Honor and Jubilee Medal on the occasion of the 450th anniversary of Ternopil;
- Letter of Blessing from Pope John Paul II (1990);
- Journalist of the Year (Ukrainian Canadian Congress, 1992).

== Bibliography ==
- Романюк М. Оратаї журналістської ниви. Українські редактори, видавці, публіцисти / М. Романюк; НАН України, Львів. наук. б-ка ім. В. Стефаника, Н.-д. центр періодики. — Львів : [б. в.], 2002 — [Кн. 1]. — 2002. С. 58—59.
- Сорока П. Нарис життя і творчості Василя Дідюка. - Т., 1996; «Журавлина» книга. Тернопільська українська західна діаспора: Словник імен. — Т., 1999. — Ч. 1.
- Шот М. Борнею здобував, словом засівав // Вільне життя плюс. — 2021. — № 65 (20 серп.). — С. 5. — (До 30-річчя Незалежності України).
- Шот М. Борнею здобував, словом засівав // Вільне життя плюс. — 2024. — № 100 (13 груд.). — С. 3. — (Українці в світі).
- Чорпіта О. Василь Дідюк // Золота пектораль. — 2015. — № 1/2. Чортків і околиці. — С. 119—120.
- Ольга Чорпіта (2013-09-01). "Десять років тому в Канаді перестало битися серце Василя Дідюка з Криволуки". Золота Пектораль.
- Чорпіта О. Видатний український письменник, сатирик Василь Дідюк // Чортківський Вісник. — 2010. — 22 січ. — С. 4. — (Особистості).
