= Mykola Mykhalevych =

Ukrainian Greek Catholic priest, popularizer of beekeeping, public figure (1843–1922)

- Микола Михалевич
- Born: 1 July 1843; Romashivka, Austrian Empire (now Ukraine)
- Died: 27 November 1922 (aged 79); Butsniv, Poland (now Ukraine)

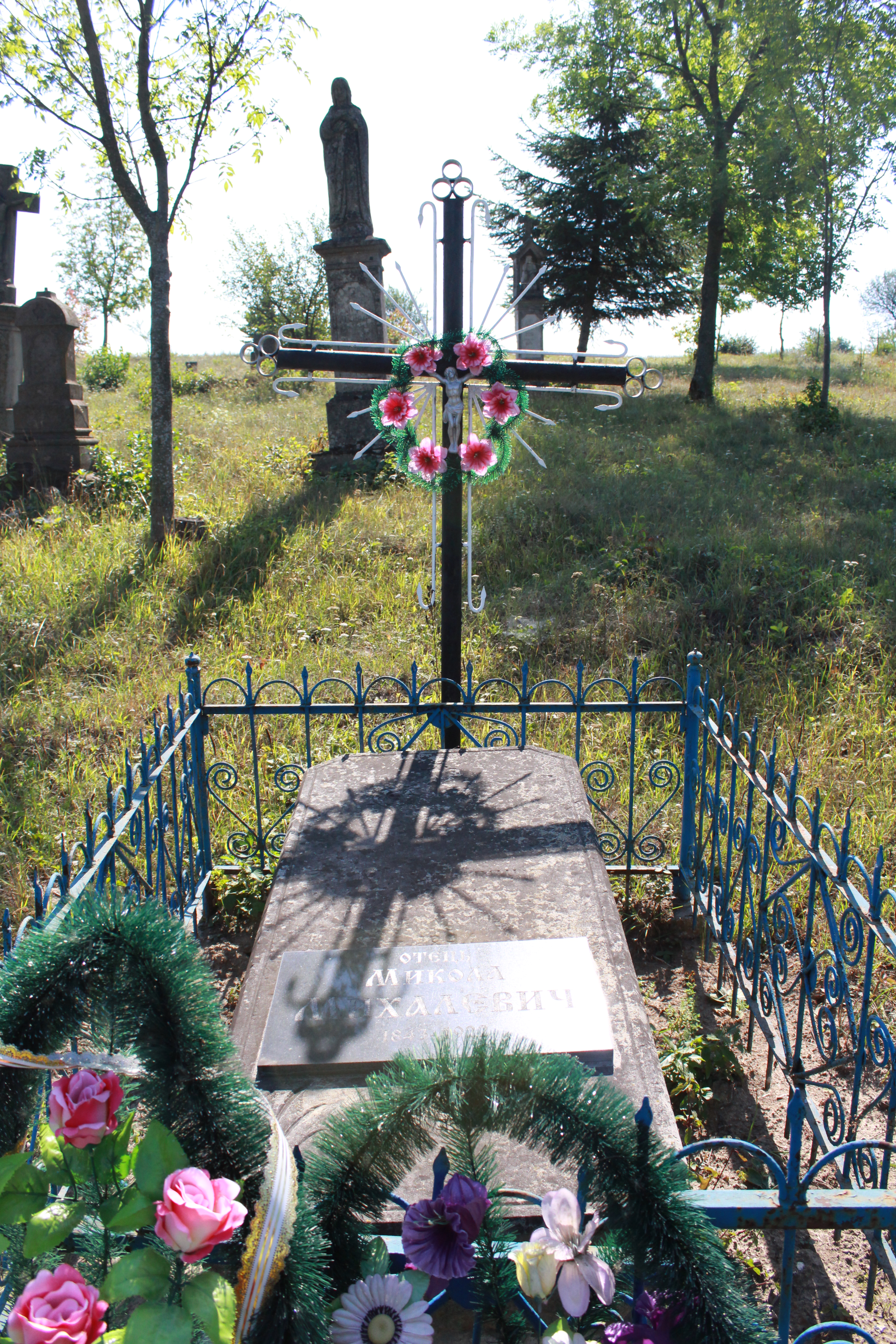
Grave of Mykola Mykhalevych in Cherneliv-Ruskyi

Mykola Mykhalevych (Ukrainian: Микола Михалевич; 1 July 1843 – 27 November 1922) was a Ukrainian Greek Catholic priest, popularizer of beekeeping, public figure.

== Biography ==
Mykola Mykhalevych was born on 1 July 1843 in Romashivka (now the Bilobozhnytsia rural hromada, Chortkiv Raion, Ternopil Oblast, Ukraine).

Mykhalevych studied theology in Lviv. In 1866 he was ordained a priest; he served in parishes in Chystyliv, Ternopil Raion, as a staff member at St. George's Cathedral in Lviv, and in 1871–1914 in the parish of Cherneliv-Ruskyi.

In his last years he lived with the parish priest, dean, and his student Sydor Hlynskyi, in Butsniv, Ternopil Raion, where he died on 27 November 1922. He was buried in Cherneliv-Ruskyi, Ternopil Raion.

=== Public activities ===
He was active in public life. In particular, he initiated the creation of the regional "Tovarystvo ukrainskykh pasichnykiv" in Ternopil (1913). The founder and chairman of the primary branch of the Prosvita in Cherneliv-Ruskyi, he promoted bee breeding and also took care of schooling.

=== Beekeeping ===
He established an apiary with more than 100 bee colonies (he conducted observations and experiments), introduced new types of hives, including the "Halytskyi" type. During the World War I, the apiary was destroyed, and only 30 bee colonies were restored.

Contributed to several journals ("Ukrainske bdzhilnytstvo", "Ukrainskyi pasichnyk", "Hospodarskyi chasopys"), published the book "Pasika", which was later reprinted several times.

== Commemoration ==
A street in Ternopil was named after Mykhalevych (1991), and a statue was unveiled in Cherneliv-Ruskyi (2001, sculptor Vasyl Sadovnyk, architect Danylo Chepil; initiator of the construction was Bohdan Rudka). The Ternopil Regional Association of Beekeepers named after him was founded.

== Sources ==
- 1 July. 160 years since the birth of Fr. Mykola Mykhalevych // Literature on significant and memorable dates of Ternopil Oblast as of 2003 : бібліогр. список / Упр. культури Терноп. облдержадмін., Упр. у справах преси та інформації Терноп. облдержадмін., Терноп. обл. універс. наук. б-ка; уклад. М. Друневич; ред. Г. Моліцька; відп. за випуск В. Вітенко, Тернопіль : Підручники і посібники, 2003, s. 30–31.
- 1 July. 160 years since the birth of Mykola Mykhalevych // Literature on significant and memorable dates of Ternopil Oblast as of 2013 : бібліогр. покажч. Вип. 23 / Упр. культури Терноп. облдержадмін., Терноп. обл. універс. наук. б-ка; уклад. М. Пайонк; ред. О. Раскіна; кер. проєкту та наук. ред. В. Вітенко, Тернопіль : Підручники і посібники, 2012, s. 30–31.
