= Dzhuryn =

Dzhuryn may refer to:

- Dzhuryn, Vinnytsia Oblast, a town in Ukraine
- Dzhuryn, Ternopil Oblast, a village in Ukraine
- Dzhuryn (river), a river in Ukraine
