= Cherneliv-Ruskyi =

Rural locality in Ternopil Oblast, Ukraine

Cherneliv-Ruskyi Чернелів-Руський
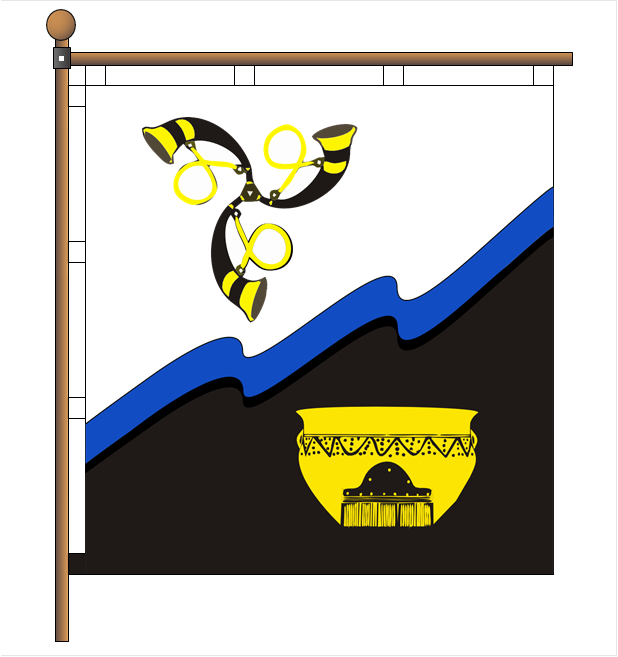
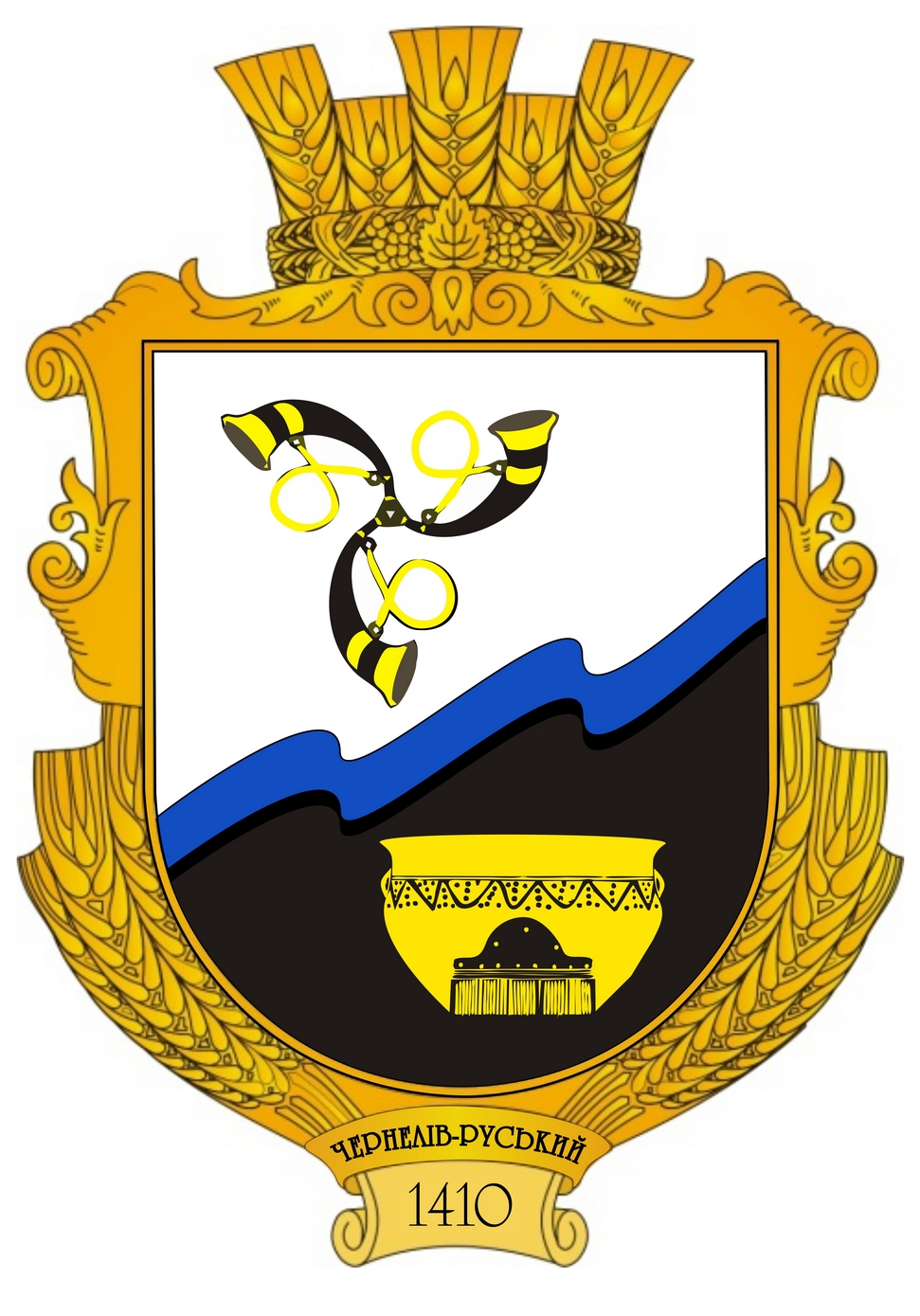
- Flag Coat of arms

- Location in Ternopil Oblast Cherneliv-Ruskyi (Ukraine)
- Coordinates: 49°32′53″N 25°45′26″E
- Country: Ukraine
- Oblast: Ternopil Oblast
- Raion: Ternopil Raion
- Hromada: Baikivtsi Hromada
- Time zone: UTC+2 (EET)
  - Summer (DST): UTC+3 (EEST)
- Postal code: 47712

Cherneliv-Ruskyi (Ukrainian: Чернелів-Руський) is a village in Baikivtsi rural hromada, Ternopil Raion, Ternopil Oblast, Ukraine.

== History ==
Near the village, settlements of Trypillian, Early Iron Age, Chernyakhovska and Kievan Rus' cultures were discovered. Excavations of Bronze Age and Pomeranian burials, as well as an ancient grave field of Kievan Rus', have been carried out. The most famous archaeological site is the grave field of Chernyakhov culture, which was studied by Ternopil archaeologist Ihor Gereta for almost a quarter of a century.

The first written mention of the is on 10 March 1410.

== Religion ==
The village has a church, the Church of the Intercession, built out of brick in 1912 by architect O. Lushpynskyi.

The village has a monument to Friar Mykola Mykhalevych, built in 2001 and sculpted by Vasyl Sadovnyk.

== Notable residents ==
- Hanna Makukh (b. 1958), Ukrainian journalist, editor.
- Bohdan Strotsen (b. 1959), Ukrainian historian, archaeologist, public figure.
- Mykola Mykhalevych (1843–1922), Ukrainian Greek Catholic priest, beekeeping popularizer, public figure.

The archaeological research was carried out by Adam Kirkor, Ihor Gereta, and Bohdan Strotsen.

== In literature ==
In 2011, B. Strotsen, Z. Ivakhiv, H. Makukh, and I. Humenna published the book Cherneliv-Ruskyi: istorychnyi narys.
