= Yaroslava Mosiychuk =

Ukrainian actress

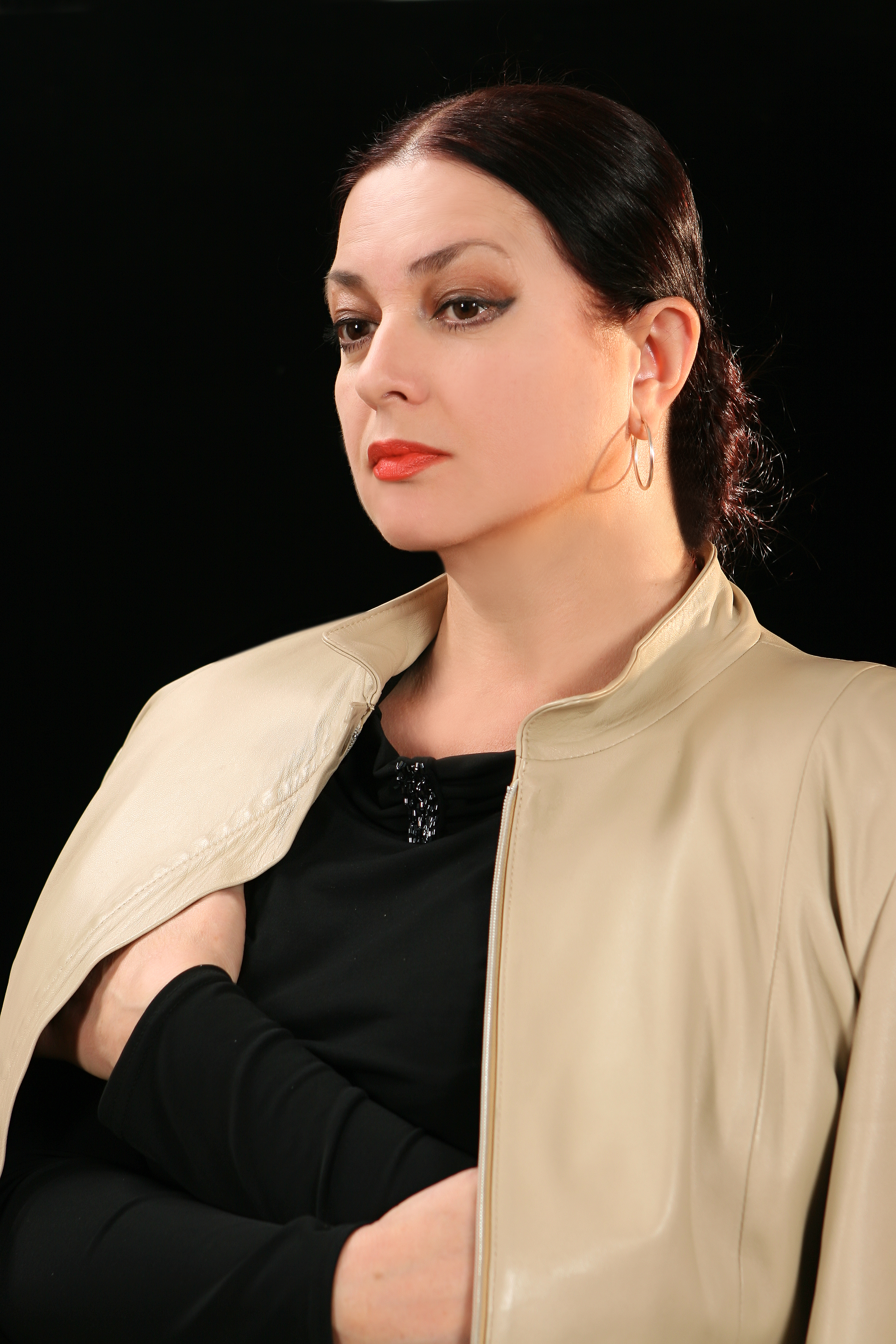
- Born: 6 June 1960 (age 65); Dzhurynska Slobidka
- Occupation: actor
- Known for: People's Artist of Ukraine
- Spouse: Oleg Mosiychuk

Yaroslava Mosiychuk (born 6 June 1960) is a Ukrainian actress. She has worked closely with her husband. She is recognised as a People's Artist of Ukraine.

== Life ==
Mosiychuk was born in Dzhurynska Slobidka, Chortkiv Raion in 1960. When she was fifteen she persuaded her mother to take her to a theatre school in Dnipro. She met her husband, Oleg Mosiychuk, there and they shared classes. She married when she was 22 in Ternopil.

She has appeared many times under her husband's direction as he is a director. They have worked together for over 30 years.

Mosiychuk is a People's Artist of Ukraine.

== Selected roles ==
- Maria – "Tears of the Mother of God" by O. Mosiychuk based on the novel "Maria" by Ulas Samchuk,
- Miriam – "The Price of Blood" by Lesia Ukrainka,
- Mavka – "Forest Song" by Lesya Ukrainka,
- Nerisa – "Obsessed. Orgy" Lesya Ukrainka,
- Varka – "Talentless" by Ivan Karpenko–Karyi,
- Katrya – "Fate" by M. Staritsky,
- Marusya "Oh, don't go, Hrytsia М." by M. Starytsky,
- Mavra – "Early Sunday…" by O. Kobylyanska,
- Oksana – "Christmas Night" by M. Gogol,
- Anna – "Stolen Happiness" by Ivan Franko.
- Traveler – "Bride of the Dawn" by A. Cason,
- Laura – "Prophetic Dreams" by F. Villon,
- Nele – "The Legend of Uhlenspiegel" by Charles de Coster,
- Lucy Crown – "That Far Summer" by I. Shaw,
- Catherine – "Eight Loving Women" by R. Tom ,
- Victoria – "For a step towards you" M. Kolyada,
- Conchita – "The Last Woman of Don Juan" by L. Zhukhovitsky,
- Graciela – "At your service, widow" R. Marotta, D. Randone,
- Marysya – "Martin Borulya" Ivan Karpenko–Karyi.
