= Bilobozhnytsia =

Rural locality in Ternopil Oblast, Ukraine

Bilobozhnytsia Білобожниця
- Saints Peter and Paul church

- Coat of arms

- Location in Ternopil Oblast Bilobozhnytsia (Ternopil Oblast)
- Coordinates: 49°2′58″N 25°40′53″E
- Country: Ukraine
- Oblast: Ternopil Oblast
- Raion: Chortkiv Raion
- Hromada: Bilobozhnytsia Hromada
- Time zone: UTC+2 (EET)
  - Summer (DST): UTC+3 (EEST)
- Postal code: 48530

Bilobozhnytsia (Ukrainian: Білобожниця; Polish: Białobożnica) is a village in Ukraine, Ternopil Oblast, Chortkiv Raion, Bilobozhnytsia rural hromada.

== History ==
The first written mention dates from 1532.

== Religion ==
- Church of the Transfiguration (OCU, 1901, brick, rebuilt in 1991)
- Church of the Transfiguration (UGCC, 2008)
- Saints Peter and Paul church (RCC, 2001)

== People ==
- Mykhailo Borysykevych (1848–1899), Ukrainian ophthalmologist, Doctor of Medicine
- Taras Senkiv (born 1960), Eparchial Bishop of Ukrainian Catholic Eparchy of Stryi
