= Teodozia Zarivna =

- Теодозія Петрівна Зарівна
- Born: June 22, 1951; Rydoduby, Ukrainian SSR, Soviet Union
- Education: The Ivan Franko National University of Lviv
- Occupations: Writer, poet, playwright, journalist, theatre critic, translator, chief editor for the literary magazine Kyiv
- Writing career
- Language: Ukrainian
- Genres: Poetry, fiction, short story, play, essay, translation
- Notable awards: The Vasyl Symonenko Literary Award (1992); The Volodymyr Svidzynskyi Literary Prize (2010); The Dmytro Nytchenko Prize (2014); The Yaroslaviv Val Literary Prize (2015)

Teodozia Zarivna (Ukrainian: Зарівна Теодозія Петрівна, born June 22, 1951) is a Ukrainian writer, poet, playwright, journalist, theatre critic and translator.

== Biography ==
Teodozia Petrivna Zarivna was born in 1951 in the village of Rydoduby in the Ternopil Oblast of Western Ukraine. She is a poet, essayist, novelist, playwright, journalist, translator, literary and theatre critic, writer and host of literary and cultural TV programs.

She graduated from Ivan Franko National University of Lviv (Philology faculty, 1973) and Kyiv National I. K. Karpenko-Kary Theatre, Cinema and Television University (Theatre Studies faculty, 1979).

She worked at Ivan Franko National Academic Drama Theater in Kyiv and at National Public Broadcasting Company of Ukraine (UA:PBC).

Teodozia Zarivna is an author and hostess for many literary series and cultural programs, among them "A Literary Studio", "The Fundamental", "In the Beginning Was the Word", "Not by Only Bread...".

She has taken part in the International Literary Festivals: Bishkek, Kyrgyzstan (2008), Sofia, Bulgaria (2013), Chișinău, Moldova (2014), Poznań, Poland (2016), Brno, Olomouc, Prague, Czech Republic (2016) Vilnius, Lithuania (2017), and also has participated in the International Science Conference in Brno, Czech Republic (2015).

Zarivna has translated from Polish into Ukrainian a theatrical play Requiem for the Mistress by Wieslaw Mysliwski, and also poems of Urszula Koziol, Maria Duszka, Danuta Bartosh, Yuzef Baran, Stanislav Baranchak, Kazimierz Burnat, Carl Grenzler, Pavel Kuszczinsky, Romuald Meczkowsky, Tomasz Jastrun, and others.

Her translation from English into Ukrainian of Arthur Miller's play All My Sons was premiered in July 2017 at the Ivan Franko National Academic Drama Theater in Kyiv.

She is the author of five books of poetry, among them Acting On a Circle (1991), Provincial Thoughts (2009), Out of Ashes and Metal (2011). She has also published four novels including The Hunt For the Sky Birds (2014), which won the Yaroslaviv Val Literary Prize (2015) in Ukraine, two theatrical plays, and many documentary movie scripts.

Her literary works have been translated into English, German, Portuguese, Macedonian, Polish, Czech, Russian, and Romanian.

Teodozia Zarivna has won a number of literary prizes such as the Vasyl Symonenko Poetry Prize (1992), the Berezil Magazine First Prize (1999 and 2004), the Courier of Kryvbas Magazine Literary Prize (2003 and 2006), the Volodymyr Svidzynskyi Poetry Prize (2010), the Dmytro Nytchenko Prize for popularization of Ukrainian literature (2014), and others.

As of 2014, she lives in Kyiv. Since November 2014, Teodozia Zarivna has been the chief editor for the literary magazine Kyiv in Ukraine.

== Literary works ==
=== Poetry ===
- Acting on a Circle (1991, Ukraine)
- A Watcher For an Abandoned Paradise (1997, Ukraine)
- The Motherland in the Coat of Arms (2004, Ukraine)
- Provincial Thoughts (2009, Ukraine)
- Out of Ashes and Metal (2011, Ukraine)
- Poesias (2016, Brazil)

=== Novels ===
- Stones Growing Among Us (1999)
- A Straw Paradise (2001)
- A Willow Board (2008)
- The Hunt For the Sky Birds (2014)

=== Short Stories and Novellas ===
- A Girl Out of a Sweet Cherry (2003)
- A Lake in the Fog (2006)
- Notes on the Skirt Hem (2010)
- Ascent to Kaiserwald (2017)

=== Plays ===
- Confession for Everyone
- Theatre (translation into Ukrainian and playscript based on the novel by Somerset Maugham)
- The North Wind for Don Juan

=== Documentary Movie Scripts ===
- Cathedral
- Olzhych's Return
- Two Lives of Iryna Wilde
- The Road of Viacheslav Chornovil
- The Cossacks' Generations Live On... Oleksandr Ilchenko
- Orpheus From Marianivka
- Marko Vovchok, the Fatal Woman
- The Face of Freedom

== Awards ==
- The Vasyl Symonenko Literary Award for the book of poetry Acting on aCircle, 1992
- A Watcher For an Abandoned Paradise—the best poetic book of the year 1997 by the magazine Word and Time rating
- The Magazine Berezil First Prize for the novel Stones Growing Among Us, 1999
- The Magazine Berezil Second Prize for the novel A Straw Paradise, 2001
- The Magazine Courier of Kryvbas Prize for the novella A Girl Out of a Sweet Cherry, 2003
- The Borys Necherda Literary Prize for the book of poetry The Motherland in the Coat of Arms, 2004
- The Magazine Berezil First Prize for the novel The Hunt For the Sky Birds, 2004
- The Magazine Berezil Third Prize for the novella A Lake in the Fog, 2006
- The Magazine Courier of Kryvbas Prize for the circle of poems Provincial Thoughts, 2006
- The novel A Willow Board is one of the top-three best books of the year 2008 by the LitAccent rating
- The Volodymyr Svidzynskyi Literary Prize for the book of poetry Provincial Thoughts, 2010.
- The novel The Hunt For the Sky Birds is in the top-ten best books of the year 2014 by The Book Of The Year—2014 rating
- The Dmytro Nytchenko Prize for popularization of Ukrainian literature on television and in mass media, 2014
- The Yaroslaviv Val Literary Prize for the novel The Hunt For the Sky Birds, 2015
- The Panteleimon Kulish Literary Prize for the novel The Hunt For the Sky Birds, 2018.
