= Budaniv Castle =

Castle in Budaniv, Ternopil Oblast, Ukraine

- Буданівський замок
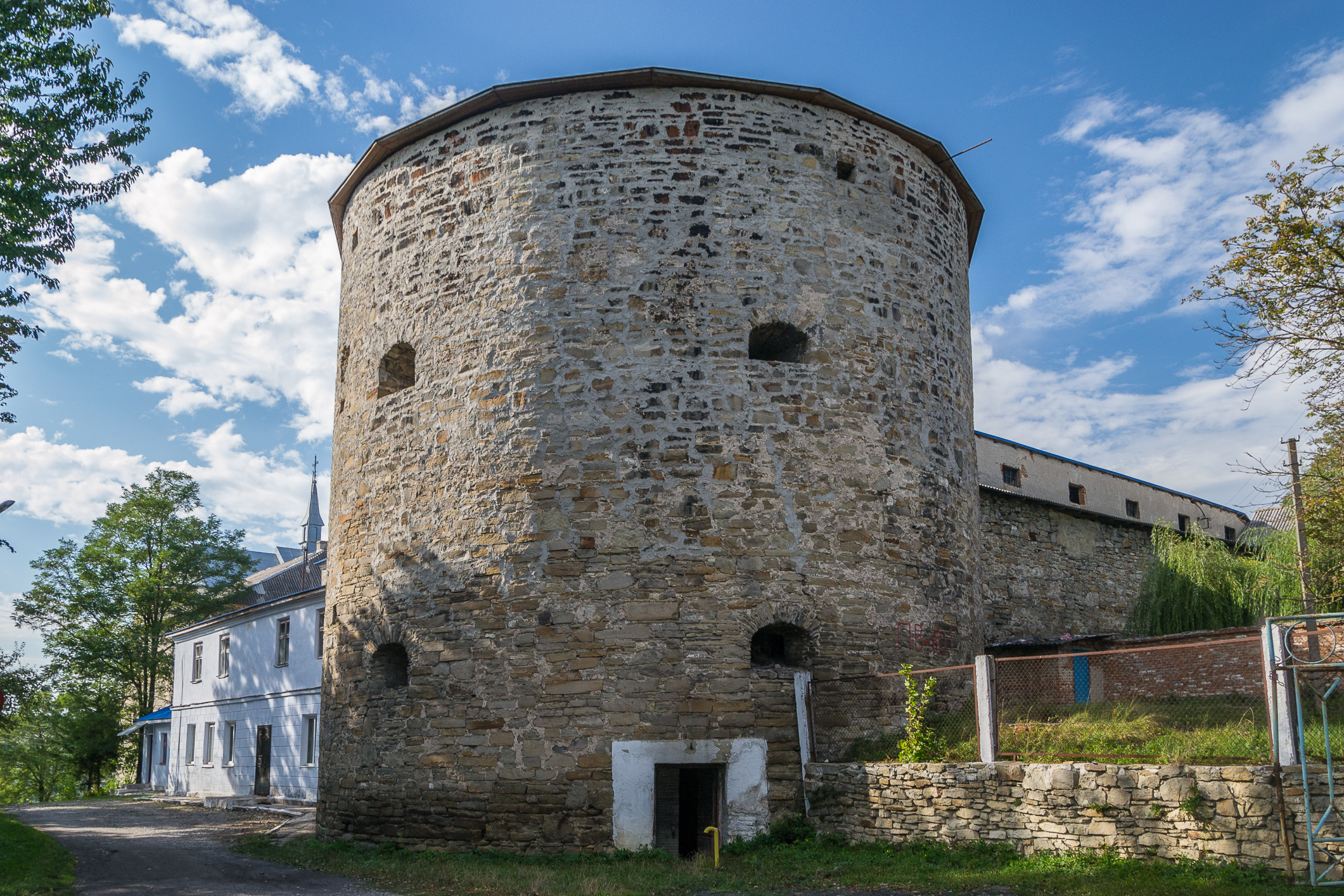
- The Tower
- Interactive map of the Budaniv Castle area

General information
- Status: Architectural monument of local importance
- Location: Budaniv, Chortkiv Raion, Ternopil Oblast, Ukraine
- Coordinates: 49°09′50″N 25°42′20″E

The Budaniv Castle (Ukrainian: Буданівський замок, romanized: Budanivs'kyi zamok) is a located in Budaniv, Ternopil Oblast, Ukraine. The nest of the 16th-century Budzanowski family, and an architectural monument of local importance.

== History ==
The first wooden castle on the hill was built by Jakub Budzanowski. It was destroyed during the Tartar invasions. In 1631, the castle passed into the hands of Alexander Sieneński, and later into the hands of the Lewoczyński family. Cossacks captured and destroyed the castle during revolts in 1648 and 1651. A survey conducted in 1661 states that the ceilings and roof had rotted and sagged, the walls and towers were cracked in many places, the windows were broken, the ovens were smashed, the stable was ruined and the bridge and gun porches were rotten. The building was rebuilt by Tomasz Łużecki. Again the castle was conquered and partially destroyed by Turkish troops in 1672 and 1675. Almost a century later because in 1765 it was decided to renovate the standing towers. From 1817, by donation, it was owned by a parish priest, so the western wing was rebuilt into a church with a chancel in place of a basteia to the south. The south wing was converted into a parsonage. In 1846, Father Kulczycki built a convent building for the Sisters of Charity with a hospital in one of the wings. The castle was destroyed during World War I. After 1945, the convent and church were turned into a hospital, with the removal of decorations and the introduction of concrete ceilings. Two bastions and the eastern section of the walls remain from the castle today.

== Architecture ==
The quadrilateral masonry establishment with four circular bastions in the corners was built in the early 17th century on the orders of Jan and Marcin Chodorowski. A gate led to the castle through a gatehouse in the northwest corner and a gatehouse from the town side.

== Bibliography ==
- Ukraina zachodnia: tam szum Prutu, Czeremoszu..., zespół red. A. Strojny, K. Bzowski, A. Grossman. Kraków: Wyd. Bezdroża, 2005, s. 274. ISBN 83-921981-6-6.
