= Palashivka =

Rural locality in Ternopil Oblast, Ukraine

Palashivka Палашівка
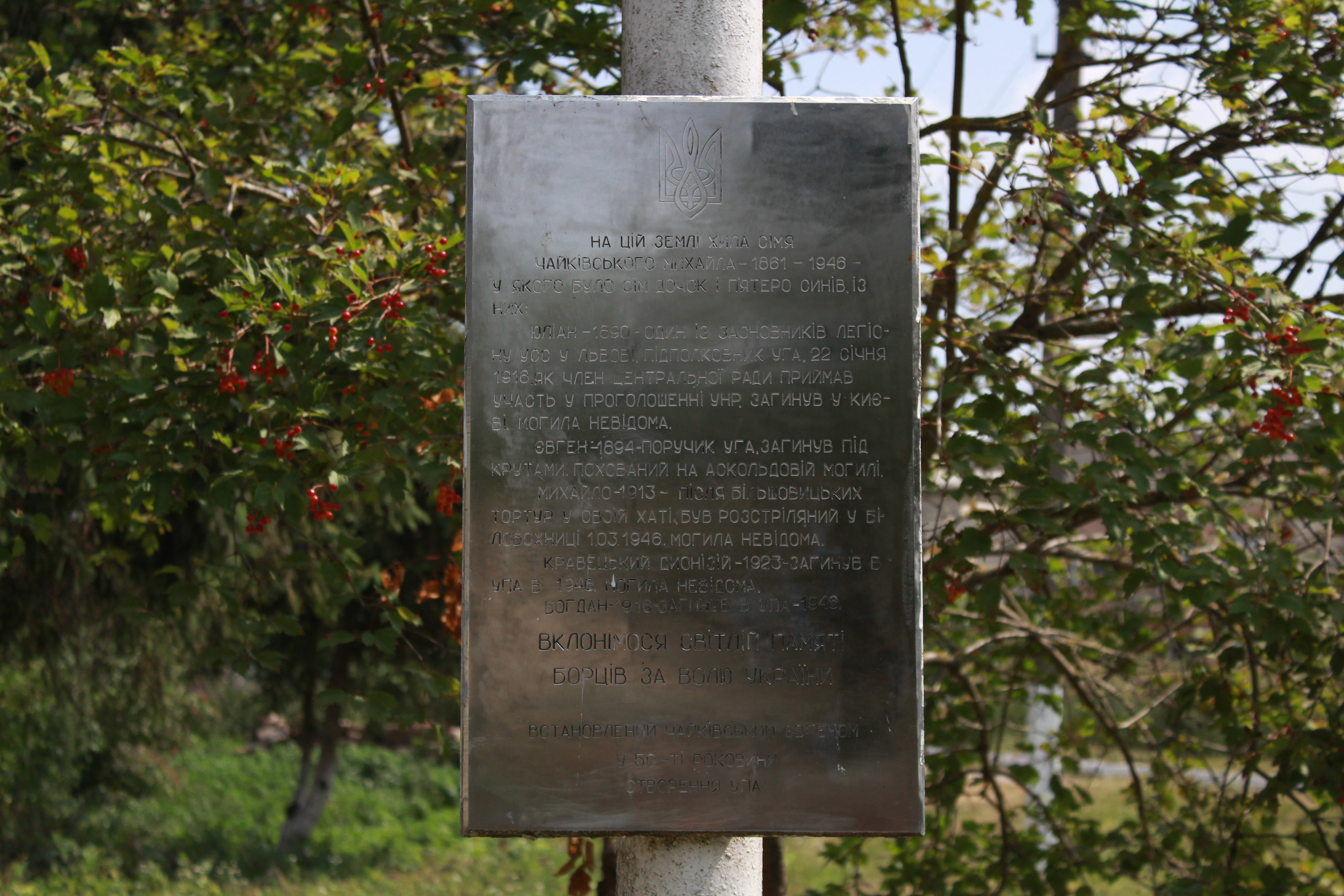

- Location in Ternopil Oblast
- Coordinates: 48°58′37″N 25°34′13″E
- Country: Ukraine
- Oblast: Ternopil Oblast
- Raion: Chortkiv Raion
- Hromada: Bilobozhnytsia Hromada
- Time zone: UTC+2 (EET)
  - Summer (DST): UTC+3 (EEST)
- Postal code: 48532

Palashivka (Ukrainian: Палашівка; Polish: Pauszówka) is a village in Ukraine, Ternopil Oblast, Chortkiv Raion, Bilobozhnytsia rural hromada.

== History ==
The first written mention dates from 1583.

== Religion ==
- Church of the Assumption (1901, brick, OCU)
- Chapel of the Assumption (1996, UGCC)

== People ==
- Yosyp Goshuliak (1922–2015), Ukrainian opera and chamber music singer (bass-baritone), librarian, and cultural activist in Canada
- Ivan Hushalevych (1823–1903), Ukrainian poet, playwright, journalist, editor, theologian, and teacher
- Ivan Karpynets, Ukrainian public figure, ambassador to the Galician Sejm
