= Mariia Shtepa =

Ukrainian writer, participant in the national liberation struggle (1925–2020)

- Марія Штепа
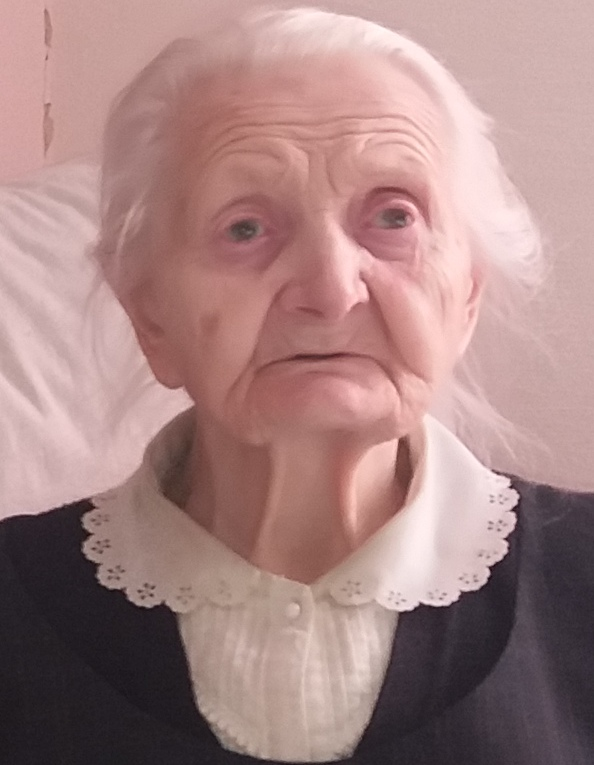
- Born: Mariia Stepanivna Shtepa; March 13, 1925; Romashivka, Chortkiv Raion, Ternopil Oblast
- Died: 1 June 2020 (aged 95); Chortkiv, Ternopil Oblast
- Awards: Order of Princess Olha

Mariia Stepanivna Shtepa (Ukrainian: Марія Степанівна Штепа, pseudonym Topolia; 13 March 1925 — 1 June 2020, Chortkiv, Ternopil Oblast) was a Ukrainian writer, participant in the national liberation struggle. Member of the Organisation of Ukrainian Nationalists (1942).

== Biography ==
Shtepa was born in Romashivka, Ternopil Oblast. In 1944—1946 she was a liaison of the armed underground in the Chortkiv Raion. In 1946, Mariia was arrested by the NKGB and sentenced to 10 years in prison. She served her sentence in a penal labor camp in Mordovia and Chelyabinsk Oblast (both now in the Russian Federation).

Since 1968, she was living in Ukraine.

Shtepa was the organizer of the church choir in the village of Bilobozhnytsia, which rehearsed at her home in the 1980s. She initiated the construction of the monument to the Victims of the Totalitarian Regime in the center of the village, as well as the restoration of the grave of the Sich Rifleman at the Bilobozhnytsia cemetery.

She was the founder of the Museum of Political Prisoners and Repressed in the Chortkiv District in the premises of the Buchach Diocesan Administration of the UGCC.

She died on 1 June 2020, in the shelter of the Chortkiv department of the Caritas Charitable Foundation.

She was buried in the village of Kalynivshchyna, Chortkiv Raion.

== Works ==
=== Books ===
- Ternysta doroha pamiati (2001)
- Nezradlyvyi dushi oberih (2001)
- Chotyry doli (2002)
- U nevianuchyi vinochok (2003)
- Khtos rozsypav chervoni korali (2003)
- Vid tiurmy chortkivskoi do sybirskoi (2005)
- Ternovyi vinok Romashivky (2006)
- Pamiat klyche (2006)
- Pryimy ikh, Hospody Bozhe, v oseliakh svoikh... (2007)
- Vidletily yanholiata, z neba svitiat nam zirkamy (2009)
- Tsei mech zlomytsia, ale ne zihnetsia nikoly (2011)
- Pid moskovskoiu shynelliu bylosia ukrainske sertse (2012)
- Obkradene dytynstvo (2016)

=== Films ===
In 2021, film director Mariia Yaremchuk and co-producer Volodymyr Khanas made the documentary Mariia from the series Zhyva UPA. On 8 April 2022, the film premiered in Lviv. On 20 October 2022, the film was screened in Kyiv.

== Awards ==
- Order of Princess Olha, 3rd class (22 August 2018)
