= Budaniv =

Budaniv Буданів
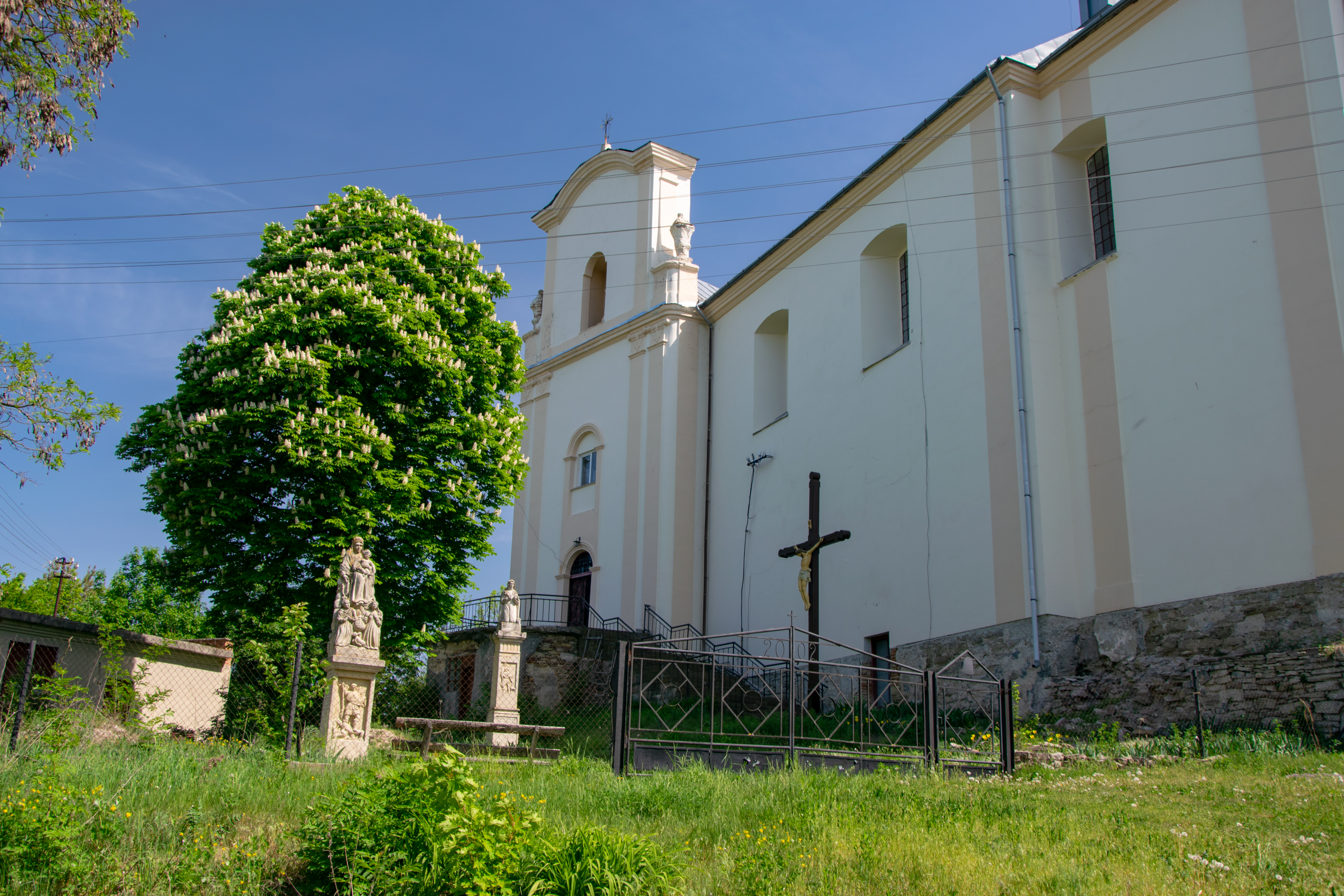
- Church of the Exaltation of the Holy Cross

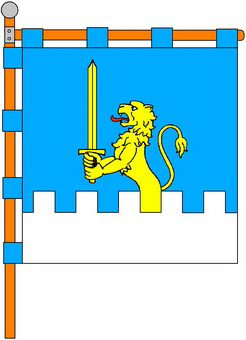
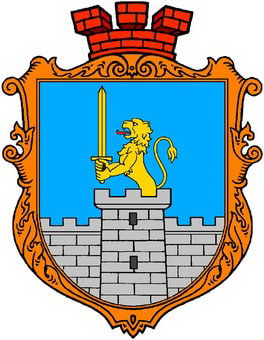
- Flag Coat of arms
- Interactive map of Budaniv
- Location within Ukraine Location within Ternopil Oblast
- Coordinates: 49.1594°N 25.7047°E
- Country: Ukraine
- Oblast: Ternopil Oblast
- Raion: Chortkiv Raion
- Founded: 1549
- Founder: Jakub Bodzanowski
- Named for: Jakub Bodzanowski
- Time zone: UTC+2 (EET)
  - Summer (DST): UTC+3 (EEST)
- Postal code: 48154
- Area code: +380 3551

Budaniv (Ukrainian: Буданів), formerly known as Budzaniv (Будзанів, Polish: Budzanów) is a village in Chortkiv Raion, Ternopil Oblast, in western Ukraine, near Terebovlya. It belongs to Bilobozhnytsia rural hromada, one of the hromadas of Ukraine. The population of Budaniv is 1,634 (2005). Before World War II, the village and its surroundings were part of the Second Polish Republic.

== History ==
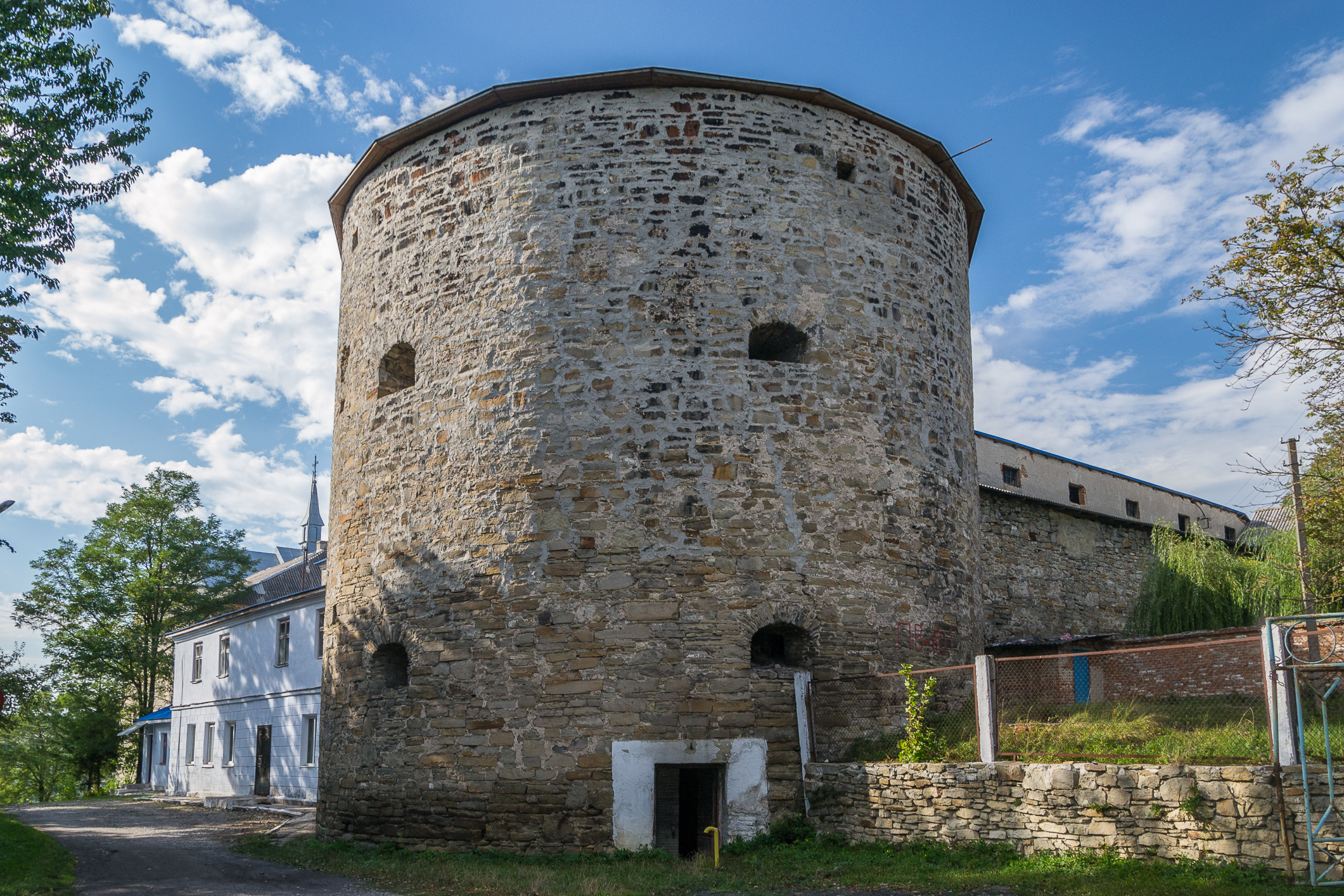
Budaniv castle

Located in the historical region of Galician Podolia, the settlement was founded in 1549 on the banks of the Seret River by Polish nobleman Jakub Bodzanowski, wojski of Halicz and was granted town rights by Polish King Sigismund II Augustus. The town was named Budzanów after its founder. Mountainous terrain of the region always attracted new settlers and about 1550 a wooden castle was built up on the peak of one of the hills. The castle was rebuilt in the beginning of 17th century. The castle was ruined by the Turks in 1675 during the Polish–Ottoman War of 1672–1676. In 1765 Maria Potocka, a Polish countess, founded a Catholic church on the castle's ruins. In the First Partition of Poland, in 1772, the town was annexed by Austria. Jews made up around 40% of the total population.

In the interbellum, Budzanów formed part of restored independent Poland. In 1931 it had around 5,000 inhabitants. Following the joint German-Soviet invasion of Poland, which started World War II in September 1939, the settlement was occupied by the Soviet Union until 1941, and afterwards by Germany. In November 1942, under German occupation, the Jews of Budzanów were deported to the Belzec extermination camp. In 1944, the settlement was re-occupied by the Soviets, and eventually annexed from Poland. Between 1944 and 1945 it saw fighting of Ukrainian Insurgent Army units against the Bolsheviks.

Until 18 July 2020, Budaniv belonged to Terebovlia Raion. The raion was abolished in July 2020 as part of the administrative reform of Ukraine, which reduced the number of raions of Ternopil Oblast to three. The area of Terebovlia Raion was merged into Ternopil Raion, however, Budaniv was transferred to Chortkiv Raion.

== Notable people ==
- Soma Morgenstern (1890–1976), writer and journalist
- Lee Strasberg (1901–1982), theatre director, actor and acting teacher
