= Papirnia, Ternopil Oblast =

Rural locality in Ternopil Oblast, Ukraine

Papirnia Папірня
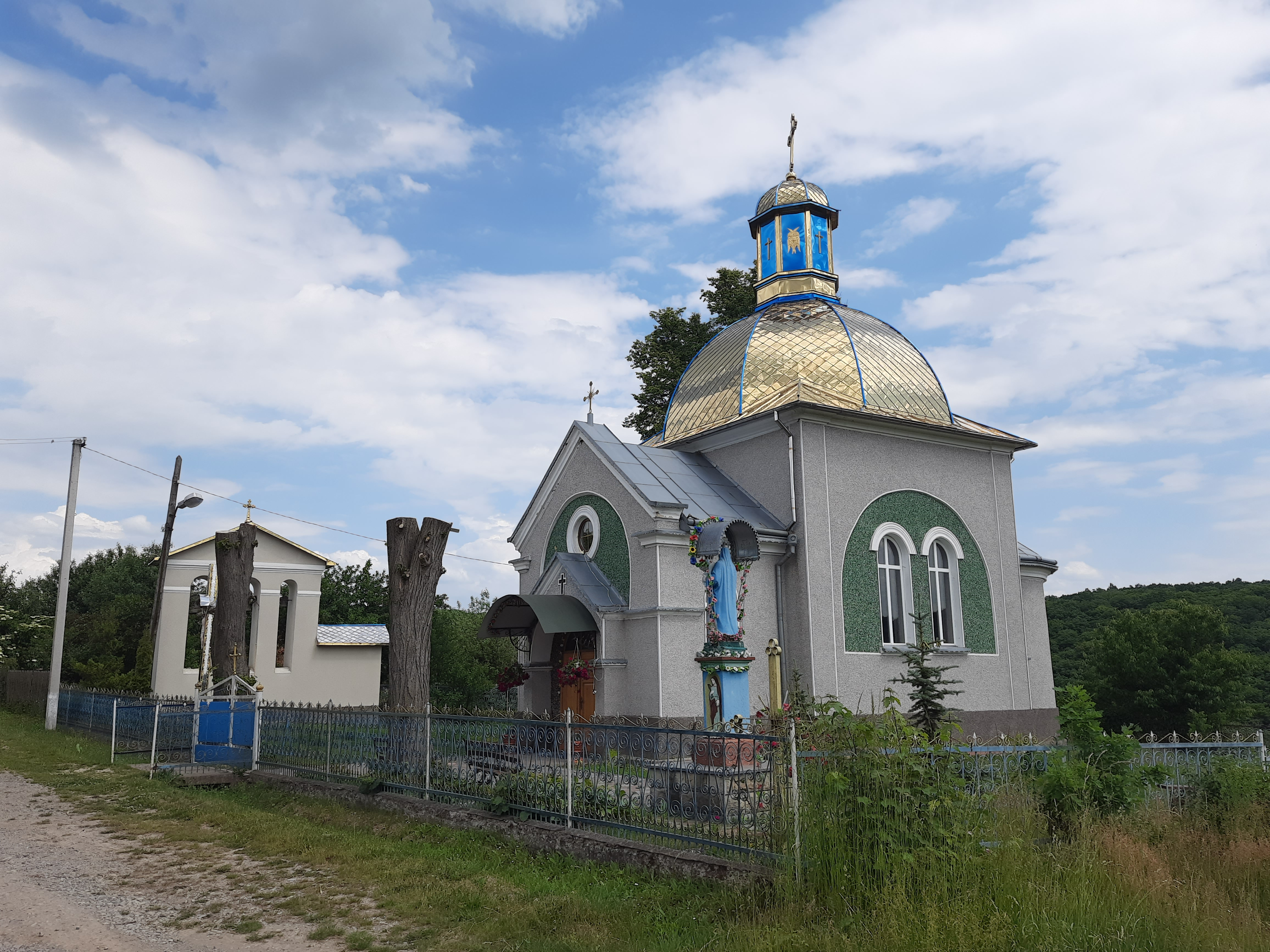
- Church of Saints Peter and Paul

- Location in Ternopil Oblast
- Coordinates: 49°8′20″N 25°46′37″E
- Country: Ukraine
- Oblast: Ternopil Oblast
- Raion: Chortkiv Raion
- Hromada: Bilobozhnytsia Hromada
- Time zone: UTC+2 (EET)
  - Summer (DST): UTC+3 (EEST)
- Postal code: 48154

Papirnia (Ukrainian: Папірня; Polish: Papiernia) is a village in Ukraine, Ternopil Oblast, Chortkiv Raion, Bilobozhnytsia rural hromada.

== History ==
The first written mention is from 1645.

== Religion ==
- Church of Saints Peter and Paul (1910, brick)
- Roman Catholic chapel (1893)
