= Rydoduby =

Rural locality in Ternopil Oblast, Ukraine

Rydoduby Ридодуби
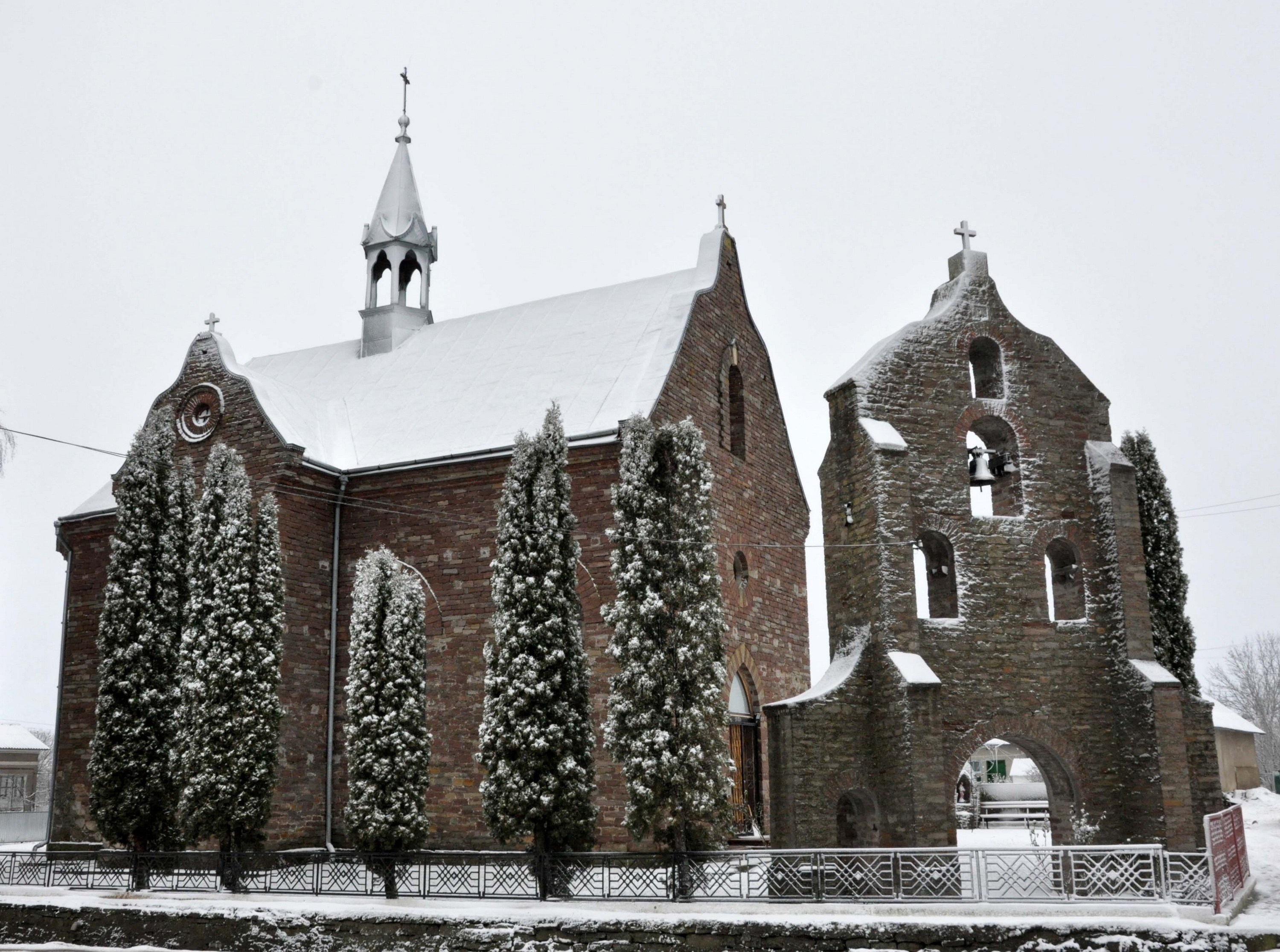
- Church of the Assumption of the Blessed Virgin Mary

- Location in Ternopil Oblast
- Coordinates: 49°3′53″N 25°38′33″E
- Country: Ukraine
- Oblast: Ternopil Oblast
- Raion: Chortkiv Raion
- Hromada: Bilobozhnytsia Hromada
- Time zone: UTC+2 (EET)
  - Summer (DST): UTC+3 (EEST)
- Postal code: 48577

Rydoduby (Ukrainian: Ридодуби) is a village in Ukraine, Ternopil Oblast, Chortkiv Raion, Bilobozhnytsia rural hromada.

== History ==
The first written mention dates from 1600.

== Religion ==
- Saints Cosmas and Damian church (OCU, 1801, brick)
- Saints Cosmas and Damian church (UGCC, 2005)
- Church of the Assumption of the Blessed Virgin Mary (RCC, 1931, brick)

== People ==
- Teodoziia Zarivna (born 1951), Ukrainian writer, theater critic, journalist
