= Skomoroshe =

Rural locality in Ternopil Oblast, Ukraine

Skomoroshe Скомороше
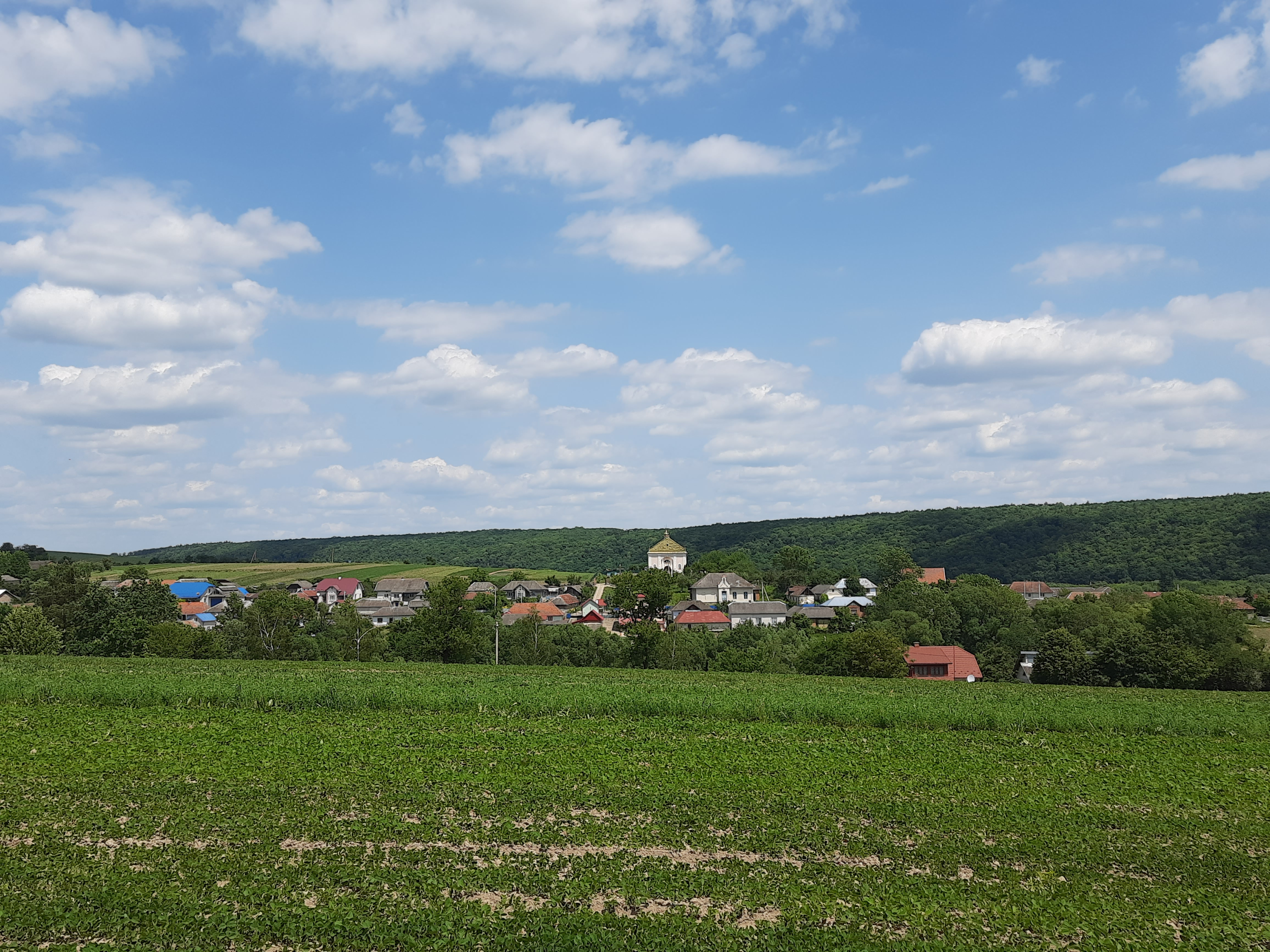

- Location in Ternopil Oblast
- Coordinates: 49°7′37″N 25°43′39″E
- Country: Ukraine
- Oblast: Ternopil Oblast
- Raion: Chortkiv Raion
- Hromada: Bilobozhnytsia Hromada
- Time zone: UTC+2 (EET)
  - Summer (DST): UTC+3 (EEST)
- Postal code: 48510

Skomoroshe (Ukrainian: Скомороше) is a village in Ukraine, Ternopil Oblast, Chortkiv Raion, Bilobozhnytsia rural hromada.

== History ==
The first written mention dates from 1508.

== Religion ==
- Church of the Exaltation of the Holy Cross (UGCC, 1812)
- Saint Demetrius church (OCU, 1992)

== People ==
- Vasyl Hradovyi (born 1964), Ukrainian businessman and public figure
