= Burial ground of Cherneliv-Ruskyi =

Bronze-age archaeological site in Ternopil Oblast, Ukraine

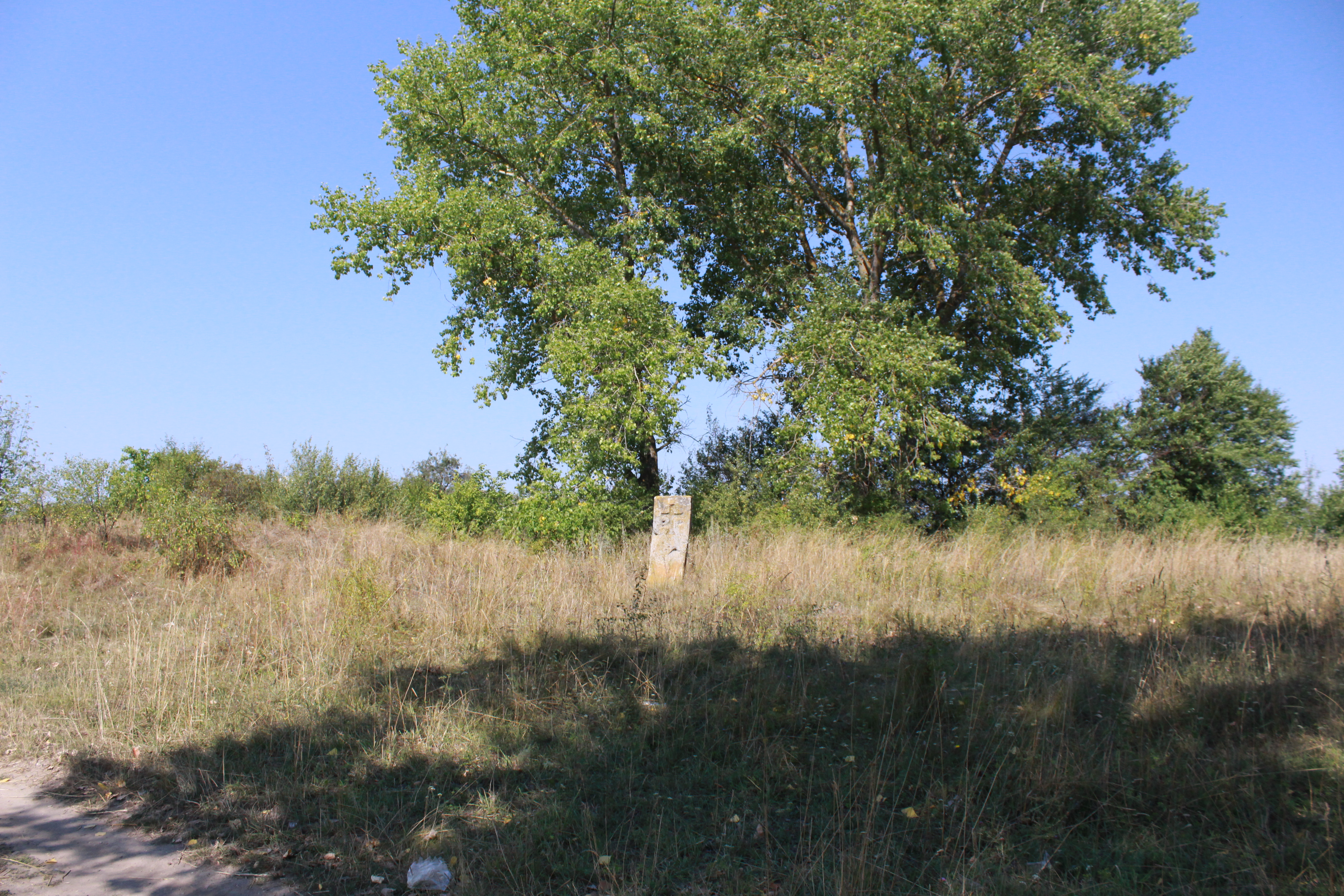
- Interactive map of Burial ground of Cherneliv-Ruskyi
- 49°32′58″N 25°45′36″E
- Location: Cherneliv-Ruskyi, Ternopil Oblast, Ukraine

Immovable Monument of Local Significance of Ukraine
- Official name: Могильник Чернелів-Руський (Burial ground of Cherneliv-Ruskyi)
- Type: Archaeology
- Reference no.: 4338-Тр

The burial ground of Cherneliv-Ruskyi is a burial site of the Chernyakhov culture, an archaeological monument of local importance. It is located in the Mohylky tract of the village of Cherneliv-Ruskyi in the Baikivtsi Hromada of the Ternopil Raion of the Ternopil Oblast, which is the most studied in the territory of Right-bank Ukraine.

The site was investigated between 1973 and 2000 by Ukrainian archaeologist Ihor Gereta. During the excavations, 315 burials were discovered, including 288 Chernyakhov, 24 Kievan Rus', two Pomeranian, and one unidentified burial, probably dating from the Bronze Age.

Reports on archaeological research at the burial ground of Cherneliv-Ruskyi are stored in the Scientific Archives of the NASU Institute of Archaeology and the Ternopil Regional Museum of Local Lore, which houses all archaeological materials.

== Sources ==
- Ґерета, І. П. (2013). Чернелево-Руський могильник / упор. В. С. Тиліщак (in Ukrainian) (OIUM. — № 3 ed.). Kyiv, Ternopil: Терно-граф. ISBN 978-966-457-199-6.
