= Kryvolyka, Ternopil Oblast =

Rural locality in Ternopil Oblast, Ukraine

Kryvolyka Криволука
- Location in Ternopil Oblast
- Coordinates: 48°58′36″N 25°32′0″E
- Country: Ukraine
- Oblast: Ternopil Oblast
- Raion: Chortkiv Raion
- Hromada: Bilobozhnytsia Hromada
- Time zone: UTC+2 (EET)
  - Summer (DST): UTC+3 (EEST)
- Postal code: 48532

Kryvolyka (Ukrainian: Криволука; Polish: Krzywołuka) is a village in Ukraine, Ternopil Oblast, Chortkiv Raion, Bilobozhnytsia rural hromada.

== History ==
Known since the late 17th century.

== Religion ==
- Church of the Annunciation of the Blessed Virgin Mary (OCU, 1898, wooden)

== People ==
- Wasyl Didiuk (1915–2003), Ukrainian public and political figure, journalist, writer, humorist, satirist, and editor.
