= Semakivtsi, Ternopil Oblast =

Rural locality in Ternopil Oblast, Ukraine

Semakivtsi Семаківці
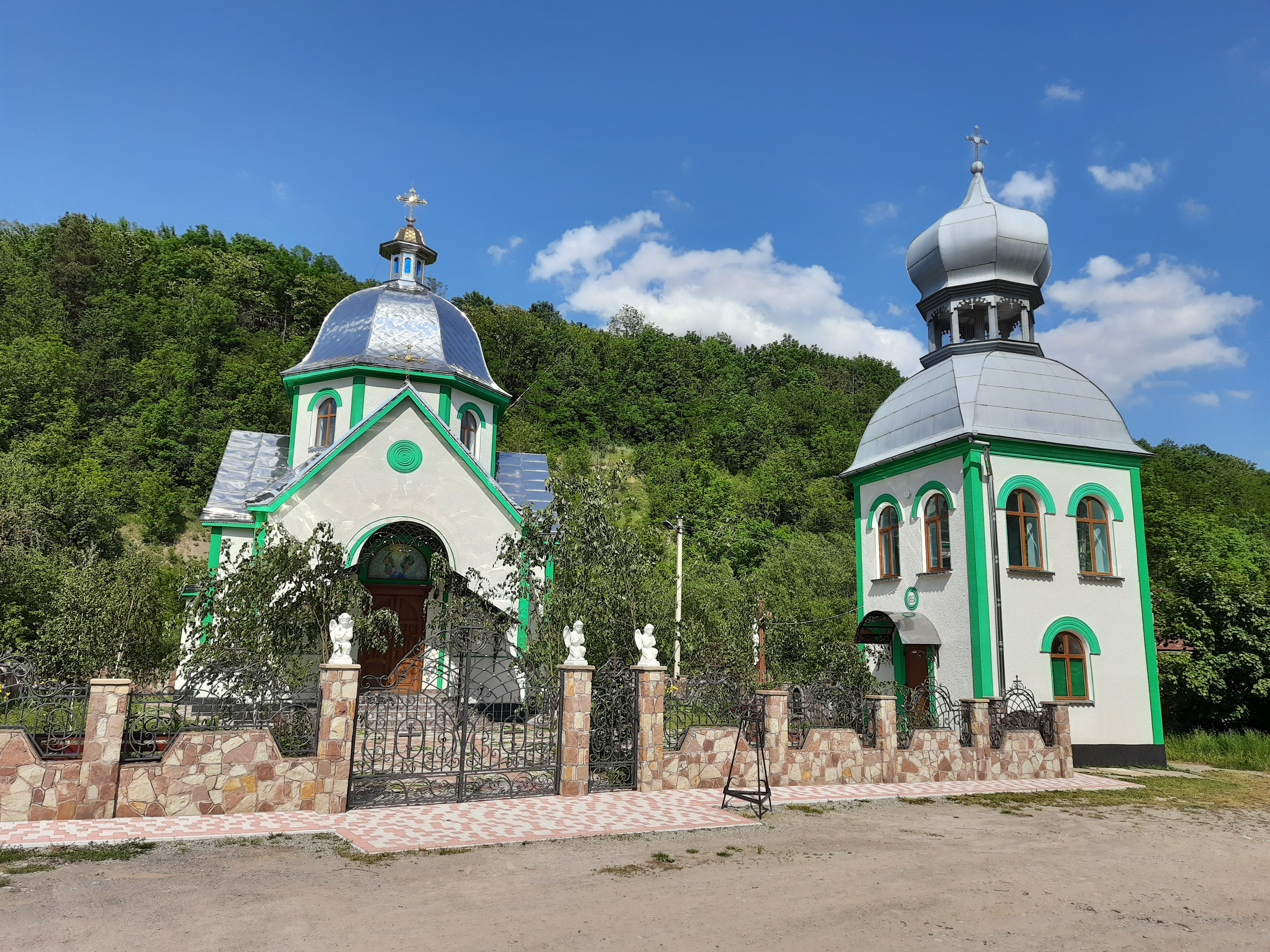
- Holy Trinity church

- Location in Ternopil Oblast
- Coordinates: 49°3′46″N 25°41′52″E
- Country: Ukraine
- Oblast: Ternopil Oblast
- Raion: Chortkiv Raion
- Hromada: Bilobozhnytsia Hromada
- Time zone: UTC+2 (EET)
  - Summer (DST): UTC+3 (EEST)
- Postal code: 48530

Semakivtsi (Ukrainian: Семаківці; Polish: Siemiakowce) is a village in Ukraine, Ternopil Oblast, Chortkiv Raion, Bilobozhnytsia rural hromada.

== History ==
It is known that in 1902 a large landed property belonged to Władysław Ochocki.

== Religion ==
- Church of the Holy Trinity (OCU, 1939)
- Church of the Transfiguration (RCC, 1895)
