= Kalynivshchyna, Ternopil Oblast =

Rural locality in Ternopil Oblast, Ukraine

Kalynivshchyna Калинівщина
- Location in Ternopil Oblast
- Coordinates: 49°2′47″N 25°44′10″E
- Country: Ukraine
- Oblast: Ternopil Oblast
- Raion: Chortkiv Raion
- Hromada: Bilobozhnytsia Hromada
- Time zone: UTC+2 (EET)
  - Summer (DST): UTC+3 (EEST)
- Postal code: 48530

Kalynivshchyna (Ukrainian: Калинівщина; Polish: Kalinowszczyzna) is a village in Ukraine, Ternopil Oblast, Chortkiv Raion, Bilobozhnytsia rural hromada.

== History ==
Known since the 17th century.

== Religion ==
- Saint Michael church (1992, OCU, brick)
