= Mazurivka =

Rural locality in Ternopil Oblast, Ukraine

Mazurivka Мазурівка
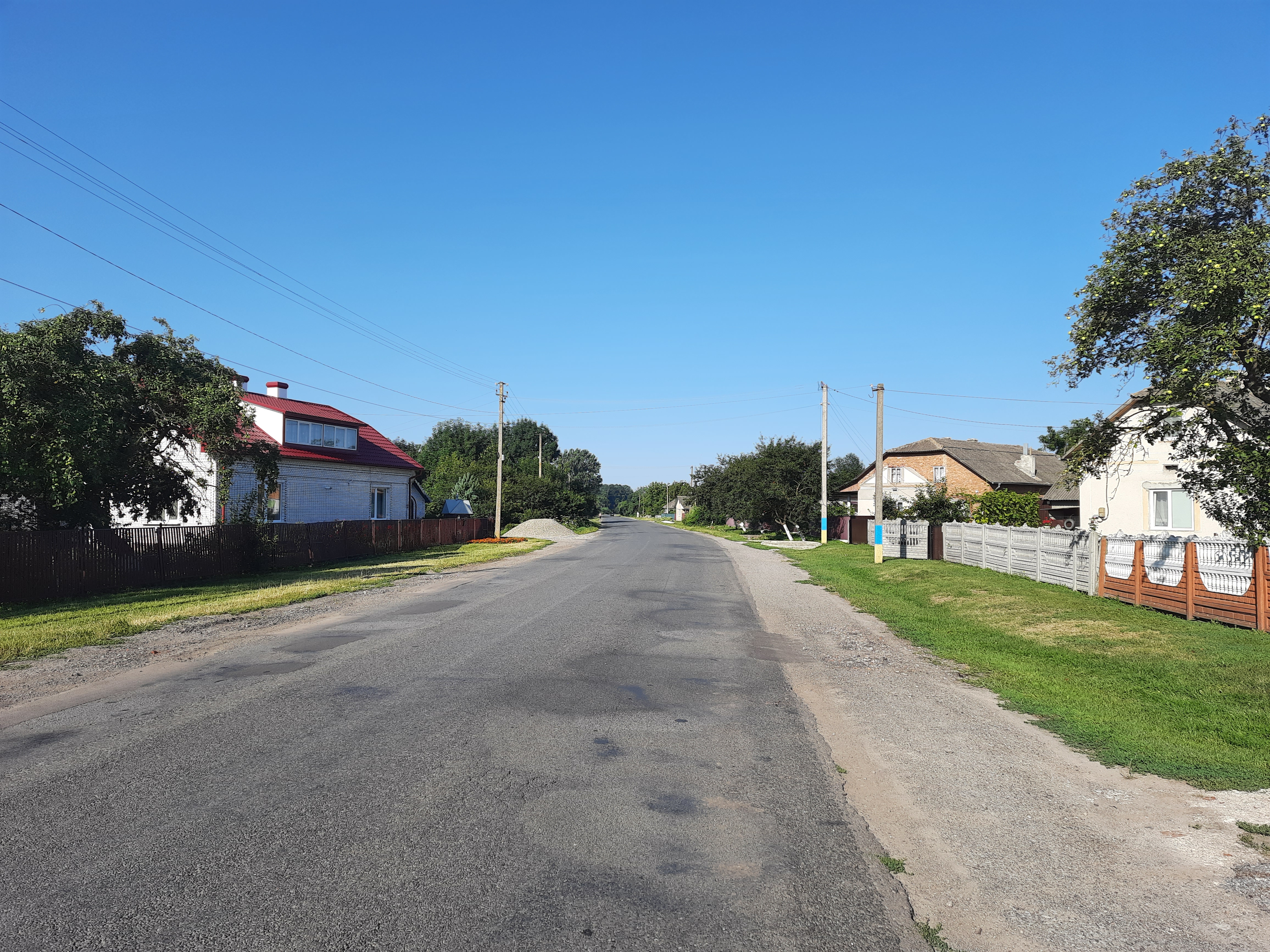

- Location in Ternopil Oblast
- Coordinates: 49°2′58″N 25°40′53″E
- Country: Ukraine
- Oblast: Ternopil Oblast
- Raion: Chortkiv Raion
- Hromada: Bilobozhnytsia Hromada
- Time zone: UTC+2 (EET)
  - Summer (DST): UTC+3 (EEST)
- Postal code: 48530

Mazurivka (Ukrainian: Мазурівка; Polish: Mazurówka) is a village in Ukraine, Ternopil Oblast, Chortkiv Raion, Bilobozhnytsia rural hromada.

== History ==
By decisions of 9 April and 25 June 2015, the Ternopil Regional Council restored the village, registered it and subordinated it to the Bilobozhnytsia village council. On 4 September of the same year, it became part of the Bilobozhnytsia village community.

== Religion ==
There are two chapels in the village.
