= Skomorokhy, Ternopil Raion, Ternopil Oblast =

Village in Ternopil Oblast, Ukraine

Skomorokhy Скоморохи
- Location in Ternopil Oblast
- Coordinates: 49°28′42″N 25°33′58″E
- Country: Ukraine
- Oblast: Ternopil Oblast
- Raion: Ternopil Raion
- Hromada: Velyki Hayi Hromada
- Postal code: 47730

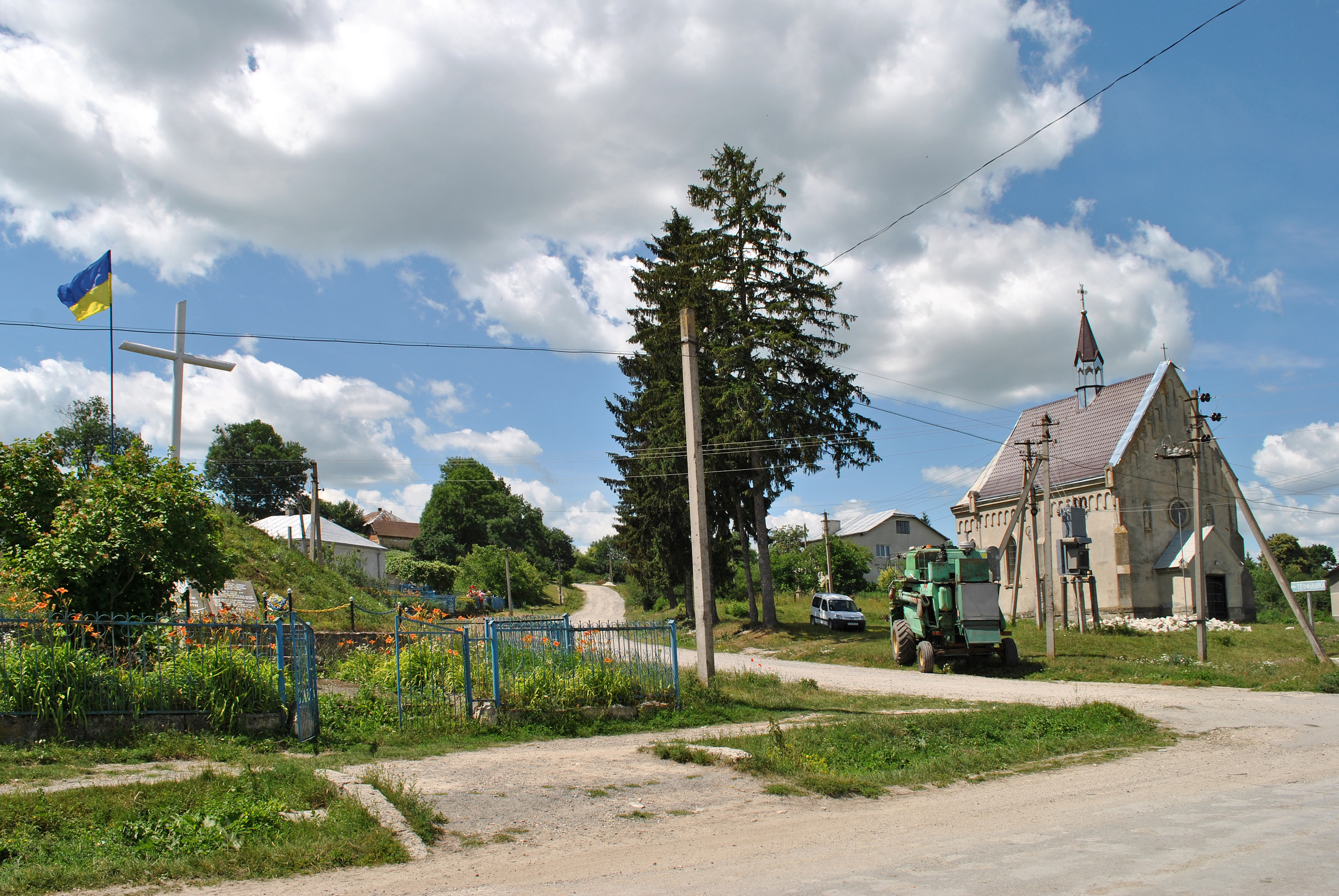
The connection of the C201519 road "Teofilivka - (Grabovets - Skomorokhy)" (left) with C201509 "Grabovets - Skomorokhy", a church and a symbolic grave for the Fighters for the freedom of Ukraine in the village.

Skomorokhy (Ukrainian: Скоморохи) is a village in Velyki Hayi rural hromada, Ternopil Raion, Ternopil Oblast, Ukraine.

== History ==
The first written mention is in 1450.

== Religion ==
Church of the Holy Trinity (1906-1914, brick, painted in 1996 by artist Vasyl Mytroha, UGCC) church (1908, reconstructed in 2009, RCC)

== Notable residents ==
- Ihor Gereta (1938–2002), Ukrainian archaeologist, art historian, historian, poet, teacher, and public and political figure
