= Romashivka =

Romashivka Ромашівка
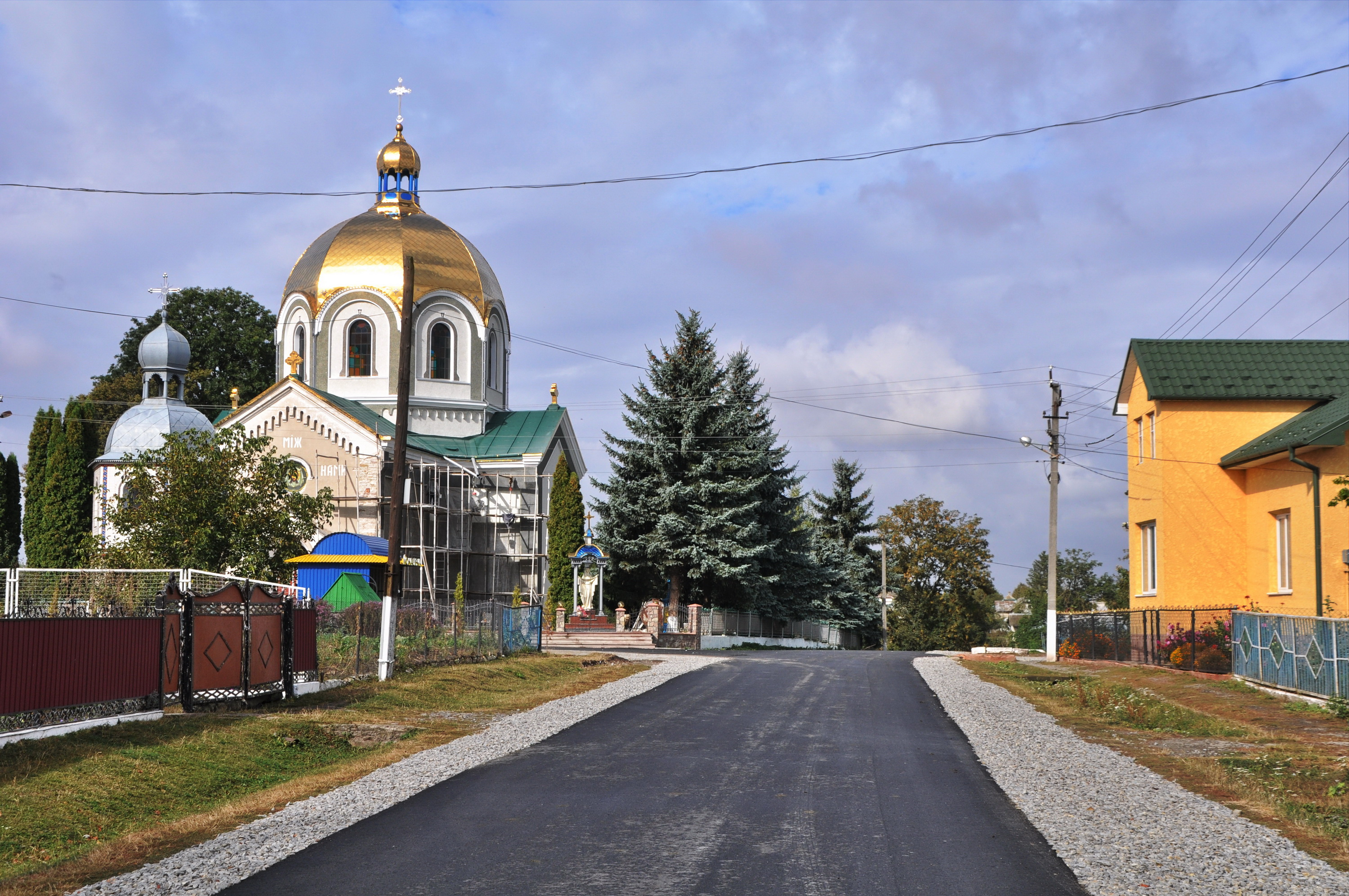

- Location in Ternopil Oblast
- Coordinates: 49°05′10″N 25°35′34″E
- Country: Ukraine
- Oblast: Ternopil Oblast
- Raion: Chortkiv Raion
- Hromada: Bilobozhnytsia Hromada

Population (2018)
  - Total: 550
- Time zone: UTC+2 (EET)
  - Summer (DST): UTC+3 (EEST)
- Postal code: 48580

Romashivka (Ukrainian: Ромашівка, Polish: Romaszówka) is a village in Ukraine, Ternopil Oblast, Chortkiv Raion, Bilobozhnytsia rural hromada.

== History ==
The first written mention is from 1763.

Since 4 September 2015, Romashivka has belonged to the Bilobozhnytsia rural hromada.

== Religion ==
- Exaltation of the Holy Cross Church (OCU, 1902, restored in 2002)

== People from Romashivka ==
- Mykola Mykhalevych (1843–1922), Ukrainian priest, beekeeping popularizer, public figure
- Mariia Shtepa (1925–2020), Ukrainian writer, participant in the national liberation struggle
