= Dzhurynska Slobidka =

Rural locality in Ternopil Oblast, Ukraine

Dzhurynska Slobidka Джуринська Слобідка
- Location in Ternopil Oblast
- Coordinates: 49°3′11″N 25°34′4″E
- Country: Ukraine
- Oblast: Ternopil Oblast
- Raion: Chortkiv Raion
- Hromada: Bilobozhnytsia Hromada
- Time zone: UTC+2 (EET)
  - Summer (DST): UTC+3 (EEST)
- Postal code: 48531

Dzhurynska Slobidka (Ukrainian: Джуринська Слобідка; Polish: Słobódka Dżuryńska) is a village in Ukraine, Ternopil Oblast, Chortkiv Raion, Bilobozhnytsia rural hromada.

== History ==
The village was founded in the late 16th century.

== Religion ==
- Church of the Nativity of the Blessed Virgin Mary (1761, OCU, brick, rebuilt from the RCC church in 1992)

== People ==
- Yaroslava Mosiichuk (before marriage Kurtiak, born 1960), Ukrainian actress, People's Artist of Ukraine
