= Kosiv, Ternopil Oblast =

Rural locality in Ternopil Oblast, Ukraine

Kosiv Косів
- Location in Ternopil Oblast
- Coordinates: 49°5′38″N 25°37′50″E
- Country: Ukraine
- Oblast: Ternopil Oblast
- Raion: Chortkiv Raion
- Hromada: Bilobozhnytsia Hromada
- Time zone: UTC+2 (EET)
  - Summer (DST): UTC+3 (EEST)
- Postal code: 48511

Kosiv (Ukrainian: Косів; Polish: Kosów) is a village in Ukraine, Ternopil Oblast, Chortkiv Raion, Bilobozhnytsia rural hromada.

== History ==
The first written mention dates from 1450.

== Religion ==
- Church of the Presentation of the Blessed Virgin Mary (OCU, 1812)
- Church of the Presentation of the Blessed Virgin Mary (UGCC)
- Saint Anthony church (RCC, 1846, restored)
