= Ihor Gereta =

Ukrainian archaeologist, public figure, and art historian (1938–1903)

- Ігор Ґерета
- Born: Ihor Petrovych Gereta; 25 September 1938; Skomorokhy, Ternopil Oblast, Ukraine
- Died: 5 June 2002 (aged 63); Ternopil, Ternopil Oblast, Ukraine
- Education: Chernivtsi University
- Occupation: Archaeologist

Ihor Petrovych Gereta (Ukrainian: Ігор Петрович Ґерета, 25 September 1938, Skomorokhy, Ternopil Oblast – 5 June 2002, Ternopil) was a Ukrainian archaeologist, public and political figure, and art historian. Head of the Ternopil branch of the Shevchenko Scientific Society (1996). Additionally, he was a member of the National Union of Artists of Ukraine (2002).

== Biography ==
In 1962, he graduated from the Chernivtsi University. After graduation, he worked as the head of the department, organizer and head of the art gallery (1978–1986), and a leading researcher at the Ternopil Museum of Local Lore.

In 1965–1966 he was persecuted by the Soviet authorities. In 1991, he became the organizer and director of the Institute of National Revival of Ukraine (Ternopil; in 2002 it was named in his honor).

He worked as a teacher of archeology and history of Ukraine, history of Ukrainian art at the Higher Theological Seminary and Pedagogical University in Ternopil.

He is buried in Velyka Berezovytsia, Ternopil Raion. Since 2004, Gereta's collection has been kept at the Ternopil Art Museum.

=== Archaeological activity ===
Since 1964, he has been researching archaeological sites of the Chernyakhov culture of the III–IV centuries in the Ternopil Oblast, including the burial ground in Cherneliv-Ruskyi, Ternopil Raion.

=== Public activity ===
He organized the exhibitions of the Ternopil Art Museum (1978), Solomiya Krushelnytska Museum (1963, Bila, Ternopil Raion), Volodymyr Hnatiuk Ethnographic and Memorial Museum (1969, Velesniv, Chortkiv Raion), Les Kurbas Museum (1987, Staryi Skalat, Ternopil Raion).

In 1994, he initiated the creation of the Ternopil Experimental School of Arts.

He is the author of scientific articles and collections of poetry and prose.

== Awards ==
- 1998 – Merited Figures of Arts of Ukraine
- 1997 – Literary Prize named after brothers Bohdan and Levko Lepkyi
- 2002 – All-Ukrainian Archaeological Prize named after Vikentii Khvoika
- 2003 – Honorary citizen of Ternopil

== Memory ==
In 2016, a statue of Ihor Hereta was unveiled in Ternopil.

Ihor Gereta's star is installed on the Alley of Stars.
