= Bilyi Potik, Ternopil Oblast =

Bilyi Potik Білий Потік
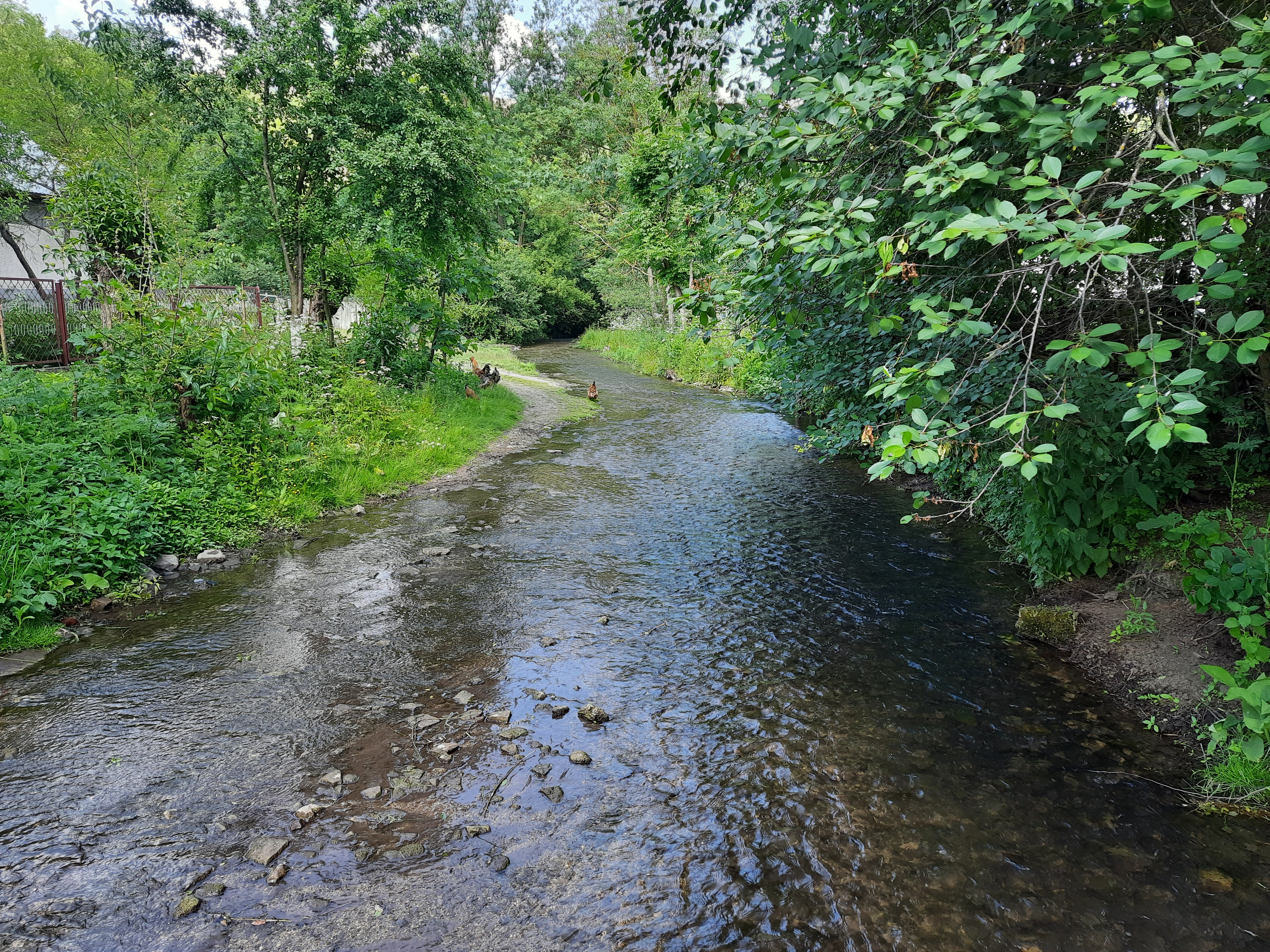
- The Bilyi Potik River near the village of Bilyi Potik

- Location in Ternopil Oblast
- Coordinates: 49°4′36″N 25°40′39″E
- Country: Ukraine
- Oblast: Ternopil Oblast
- Raion: Chortkiv Raion
- Hromada: Bilobozhnytsia Hromada

Population (2018)
  - Total: 262
- Time zone: UTC+2 (EET)
  - Summer (DST): UTC+3 (EEST)
- Postal code: 48577

Bilyi Potik (Ukrainian: Білий Потік, Polish: Biały Potok) is a village in Ukraine, Ternopil Oblast, Chortkiv Raion, Bilobozhnytsia rural hromada.

== History ==
The first written mention is from 1564.

In 1925 a skeleton burial of 2nd millennium BC and remains of two Trypillian settlements were discovered in the vicinity of the village by Józef Kostrzewski, giving the name to the so-called "Bilyi Potik culture".

Since 4 September 2015, they have belonged to the Bilobozhnytsia rural hromada.

== Religion ==
- Church of the Intercession (1805, stone, OCU)
- Church of Our Lady of Czestochowa (1933, built of red stone, RCC)

== People from Bilyi Potik ==
- Ivan Ziubrak (?—1923), Ukrainian public figure (Canada).
- Vasyl-Yakiv Kapustynskyi (1998—2023), Ukrainian soldier, actor, public figure, participant in the Russian-Ukrainian war.
- Mykhailo Kotsulym (1886—1962), one of the first Ukrainian settlers in Canada, an educator.
