= Dzhuryn, Ternopil Oblast =

Rural locality in Ternopil Oblast, Ukraine

Dzhuryn Джурин
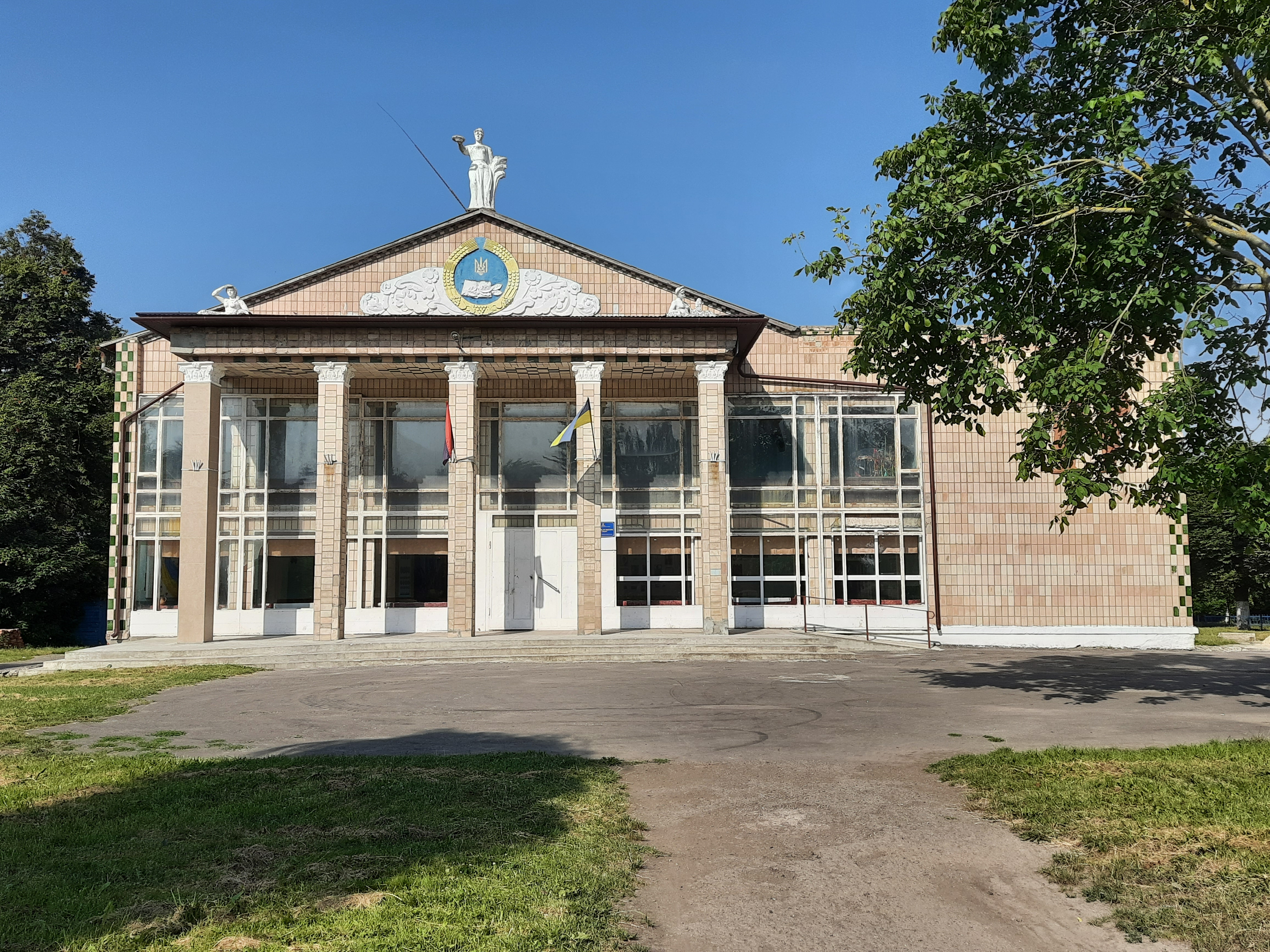
- Dzhuryn palace of culture

- Location in Ternopil Oblast Location in Ukraine
- Coordinates: 49°1′46″N 25°34′38″E
- Country: Ukraine
- Oblast: Ternopil Oblast
- Raion: Chortkiv Raion
- Hromada: Bilobozhnytsia Hromada
- Time zone: UTC+2 (EET)
  - Summer (DST): UTC+3 (EEST)
- Postal code: 48531

Dzhuryn (Ukrainian: Джурин; Polish: Dżuryn) is a village in Ukraine, Ternopil Oblast, Chortkiv Raion, Bilobozhnytsia rural hromada. It is located upon the eponymous river, a left tributary of the Dniester, in the historical region of Galician Podolia. A road connecting Buchach and Chortkiv passes through the village.

== History ==
The first written mention of Dzhuryn dates from 1607.

In May 1919 Dzhuryn was the site of a battle, during which troops of the Ukrainian Galician Army defeated Polish forces.

== Religion ==
- Saint Anne church (OCU, 1902, brick)
- Saint Anne church (UGCC, 1938, restored from a former RCC church in 2000)

== People ==
- Yevhen Baran (born 1961), Ukrainian literary critic, literary scholar, essayist
- Ivan Nimchuk (1891–1956), Ukrainian journalist, publisher, editor, public figure, political prisoner

== Gallery ==
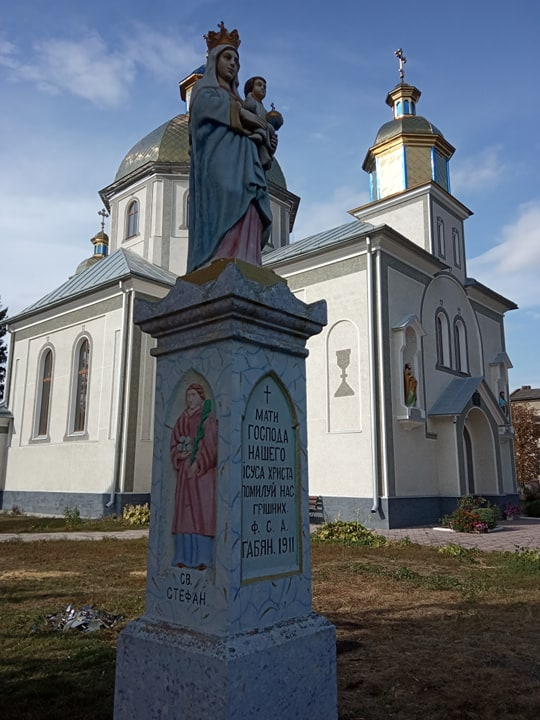
Church of St. Anne

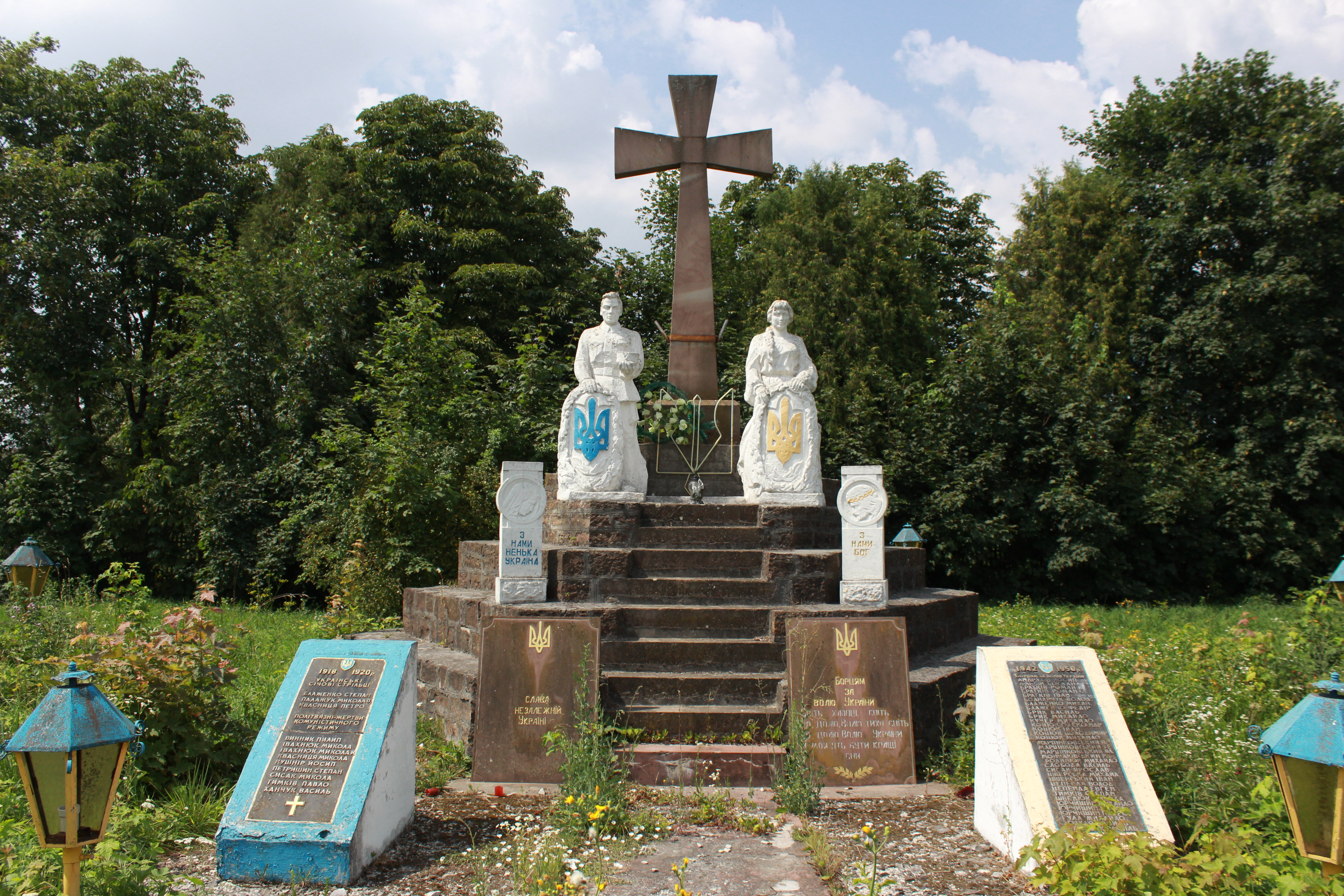
Grave of the Fighters for the Freedom of Ukraine
