= Bilobozhnytsia rural hromada =

Rural hromada in Ternopil Oblast, Ukraine

Bilobozhnytsia rural hromada Білобожницька сільська громада
- hromada
- Seal

- Location within Ternopil Oblast Location within Ukraine
- Coordinates: 49°2′58″N 25°40′53″E
- Country: Ukraine
- Oblast: Ternopil Oblast
- Raion: Chortkiv Raion
- Administrative center: Bilobozhnytsia

Government
  - Hromada head: Viktor Shepeta

Area
  - Total: 272.1 km^{2} (105.1 sq mi)

Population (2022)
  - Total: 10,642
- Villages: 18
- Website: bilobozhnicka-gromada.gov.ua

Bilobozhnytsia rural territorial hromada (Ukrainian: Білобожницька територіальна громада, romanized: Bilobozhnytska silska terytorialna hromada) is a hromada in Ukraine, in Chortkiv Raion of Ternopil Oblast. The administrative center is the village of Bilobozhnytsia. Its population is 10,642 (2022 estimate)

== History ==
It was formed on 4 September 2015 by merging Bilobozhnytsia, Rydoduby and Romashivka Village Councils of Chortkiv Raion.

On 26 November 2020, Bazar, Budaniv, Dzhuryn, Zvyniach, Kosiv, Palashivka and Polivtsi village councils of Chortkiv Raion joined the hromada.

== Settlements ==
The hromada consists of 18 villages:

- Bazar
- Bilyi Potik
- Bilobozhnytsia
- Budaniv
- Dzhuryn
- Dzhurynska Slobidka
- Zvyniach
- Kalynivshchyna
- Kosiv
- Kryvolyka
- Mazurivka
- Palashivka
- Papirnia
- Polivtsi
- Rydoduby
- Romashivka
- Semakivtsi
- Skomoroshe
