= Timeline of the Russo-Ukrainian war (1 April – 31 July 2024) =

Timeline of the Russo-Ukrainian war (2022–present)
- Prelude; (up to 23 February 2022); Initial invasion; (24 February – 7 April 2022); Southeastern front; (8 April – 28 August 2022); 2022 Ukrainian counteroffensives; (29 August – 11 November 2022); Second stalemate; (12 November 2022 – 7 June 2023); 2023 Ukrainian counteroffensive; (8 June 2023 – 31 August 2023); 2023 Ukrainian counteroffensive, cont.; (1 September – 30 November 2023); 2023–2024 winter campaigns; (1 December 2023 – 31 March 2024); 2024 spring and summer campaigns; (1 April – 31 July 2024); 2024 summer–autumn offensives; (1 August – 31 December 2024); 2025 winter–spring offensives; (1 January 2025 – 31 May 2025); 2025 summer offensives; (1 June 2025 – 31 August 2025); 2025 autumn–winter offensives; (1 September 2025 – 31 December 2025); 2026 winter–spring offensives; (1 January 2026 – 31 May 2026); 2026 summer offensives; (1 June 2026 – present)

This timeline of the Russo-Ukrainian war covers the period from 1 April 2024 to 31 July 2024.

== April 2024 ==
=== 1 April ===
Ukraine reported shooting down two of three Shahed drones. A power substation in Zaporizhzhia Oblast was damaged by a drone strike.

Ukrainian border guards intercepted a Russian sabotage group trying to enter Sumy Oblast.

Valeriy Chaika, a Russian-appointed official in Starobilsk, Luhansk Oblast was killed after a bomb exploded in his car.

The Security Service of Ukraine (SBU) arrested a resident of Kharkiv on suspicion of spying for Russia and a businessman from Berdiansk on suspicion of selling construction material for Russian fortifications. It also charged RT chief editor Margarita Simonyan in absentia with promoting genocide, spreading propaganda, justifying the Russian invasion and encouraging the violation of Ukraine's territorial integrity.

=== 2 April ===
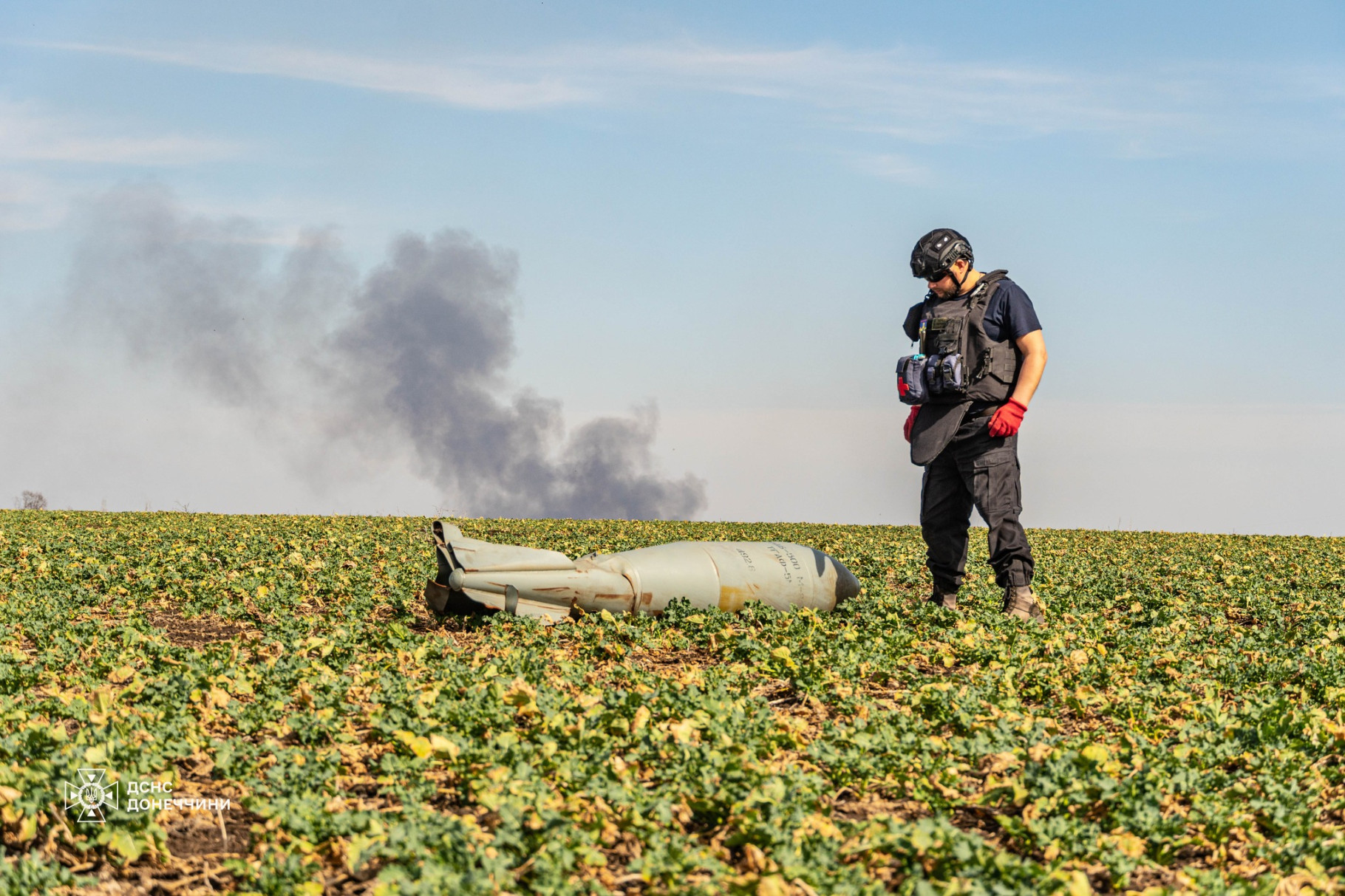
Unexploded air-dropped FAB-500 bomb in a field in Donetsk Oblast

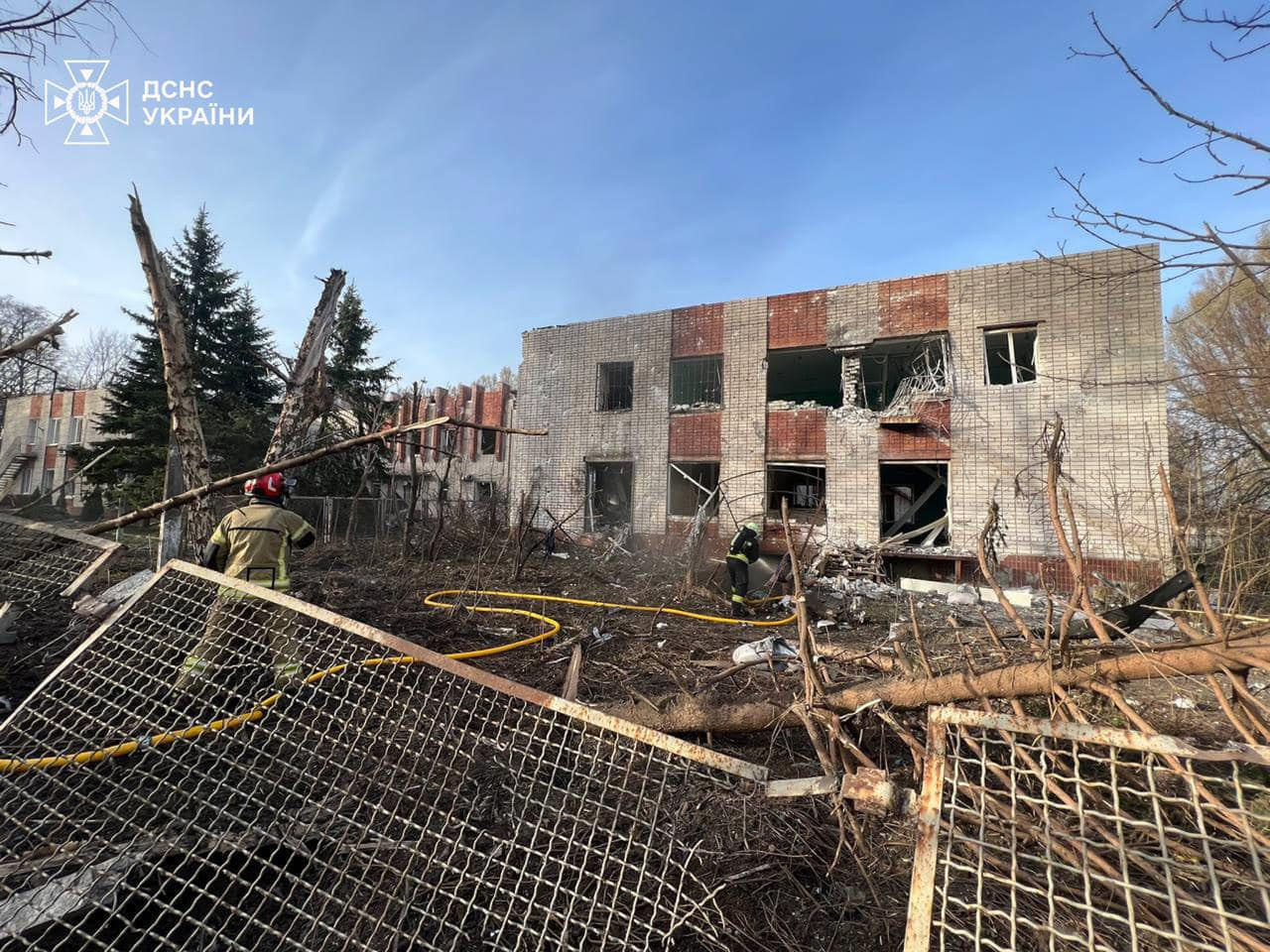
Kindergarten in Dnipro after the attack

A drone attack struck industrial facilities in Yelabuga and Nizhnekamsk in the Russian republic of Tatarstan. The drones hit the Yelabuga drone factory, causing "significant damage", according to Ukrainian officials. A local Russian official denied any damage to the factory. Russian media reported a nearby workers' dormitory was damaged, injuring twelve college students, including five minors, who were employed at the drone manufactory. Other drones struck the Tatneft oil refinery in Nizhnekamsk, causing a fire that did not cause "critical damage". A Ukrainian-made light aircraft, believed to be an Aeroprakt A-22 Foxbat, was converted into a one-way drone. Another drone attack later that day damaged several buildings in Kursk.

Ukrainian military intelligence (HUR) said it had blown up an electricity substation in Sevastopol, causing blackouts in the city.

Two people were killed in Russian attacks in Kharkiv and Kherson Oblasts. Eighteen people were injured in a missile attack on Dnipro.

Russian president Vladimir Putin appointed vice-admiral Sergei Pinchuk as commander of the Russian Black Sea Fleet.

Ukrainian president Volodymyr Zelenskyy signed a law lowering the age of conscription in Ukraine from 27 years to 25.

The Register of Damage Caused by the Aggression of the Russian Federation against Ukraine (RD4U), an online registry for Ukrainians to submit claims for damage caused by the Russian invasion, was officially opened, with at least 100 claims submitted in the first hours.

Russia's Federal Security Service (FSB) claimed to have intercepted 70 kilograms of RDX, an RPG-7 and other bomb-making material at a border crossing in Pskov Oblast from Latvia. Originating from Ukraine, the paperwork indicated that it travelled through several EU countries before reaching the Russian border. The weapons were discovered hidden in Orthodox religious icons and paraphernalia.

=== 3 April ===
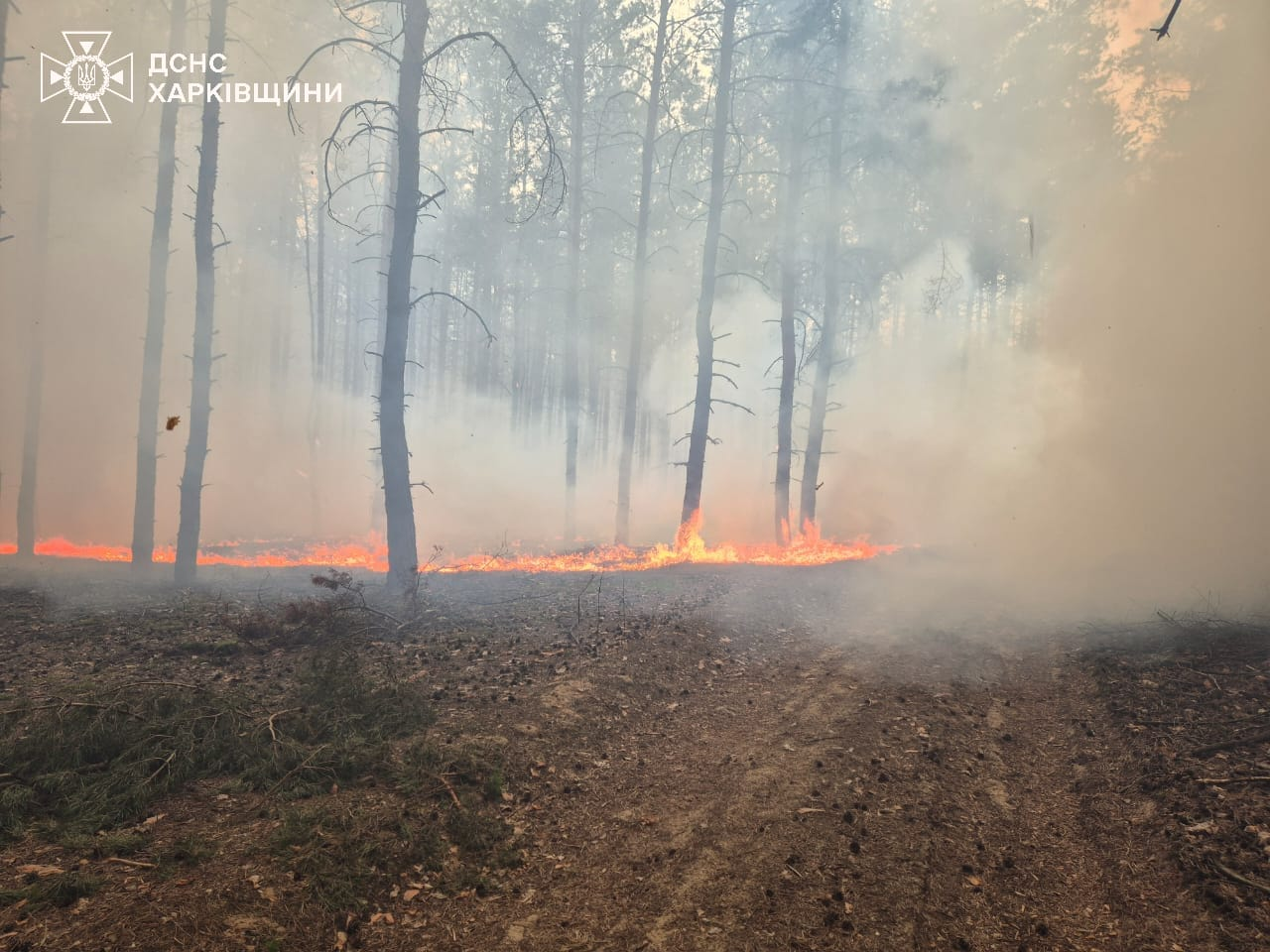
Forest fire in Kharkiv Oblast after shelling

One person was killed in a Russian missile attack in Sumy Oblast.

NATO said it was considering a long term funding package for Ukraine worth 100 billion euros ($107 billion) over five years to "Trump-proof" future military support for Ukraine. The idea was raised by Secretary General Jens Stoltenberg.

During his visit to Kyiv, Finnish President Alexander Stubb signed a 10-year security pact with Ukraine and announced 188 million euros ($203 million) in military aid and another 290 million euros in developmental aid.

=== 4 April ===
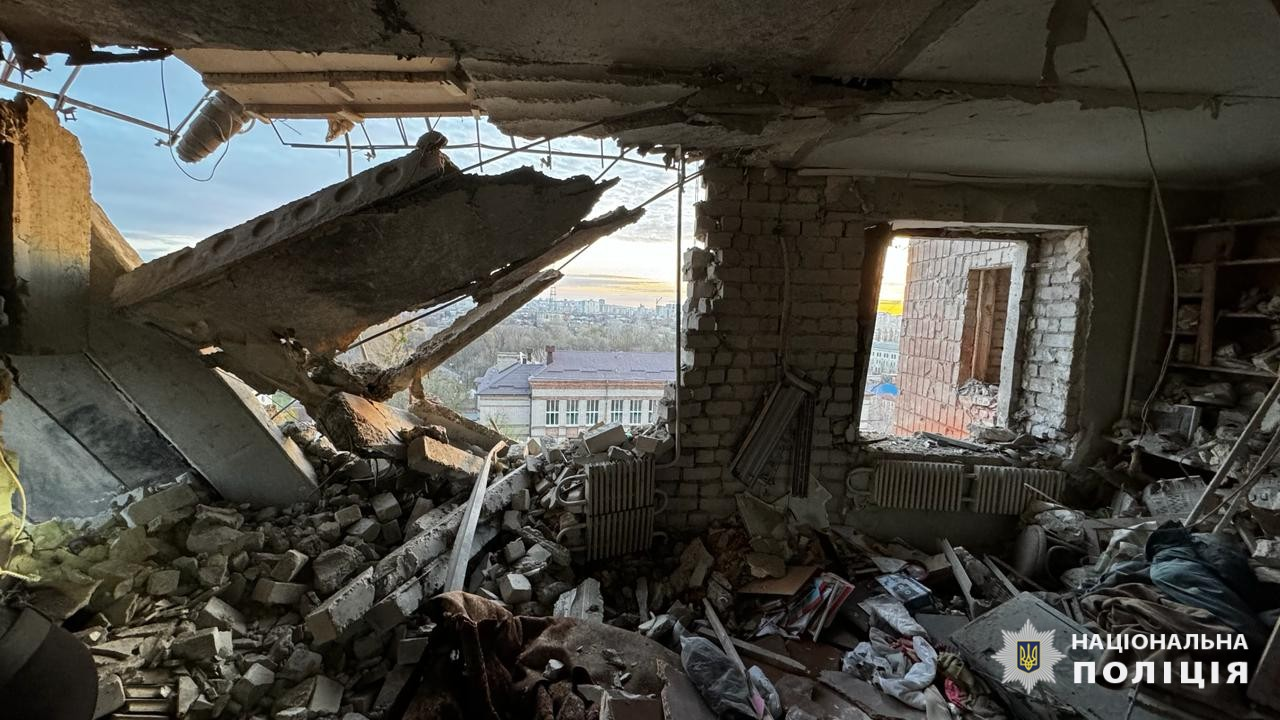
Residential building in Kharkiv after the attack

Four people were killed and twelve others were injured in overnight Russian drone strikes on Kharkiv. Another person was killed in a separate attack outside the city. Two people were killed in an airstrike in New York, Donetsk Oblast.

The Institute for the Study of War (ISW) assessed that Russian forces had reached the eastern suburbs of Chasiv Yar but were held back by Ukrainian forces.

Russia claimed to have shot down 13 drones over Belgorod, Kursk and Tula Oblasts.

Ukraine gave certificates of gratitude to a multinational group of "vigilante hackers" known as One Fist responsible for launching cyberattacks on Russian military firms and CCTV cameras "dozens of times".

The FSB announced the capture of a former Israeli Defence Force soldier who was trying to join the Ukrainian army. He was given a formal warning and deported back to Israel.

A Ukrainian court sentenced a suspect in the 2023 Kramatorsk restaurant missile strike to life imprisonment for aiding Russian forces in the attack.

Moldovan Border Police found the wreckage of a Russian drone near Etulia, at about 500 metres (1,600 feet) from the Moldova–Ukraine border.

=== 5 April ===
Ukraine launched a barrage of drones into western Russia, targeting four airbases. Ukrainian officials claim at least six military aircraft were destroyed, eight others were "heavily damaged", and at least 20 personnel were killed or injured at a military airbase near Morozovsk, Rostov Oblast. Security sources reported the airbase held Su-27 and Su-34 aircraft, while an open-source intelligence researcher reported the base also held three Su-35 aircraft. Rostov Oblast Governor Vasily Golubev claimed Russia intercepted 44 Ukrainian drones and that only a 16-storey residential block and power substation were damaged, leaving around 600 people without power. Eight people were later injured by one of the fallen drone's explosives detonating during an investigation of the site. Drones were also launched at Engels-2 airbase in Saratov Oblast, reportedly home to Tu-95 and Tu-22 bombers. The attack allegedly caused "serious damage" to three Tu-95MS bombers and resulted in the deaths of seven. One drone was shot down over the nearby town of Engels. There were no reports of casualties or infrastructure damage from the neutralized drone. Yeysk Airport, which hosts the aviation units of the 4th Army of the Russian Air Force, was also allegedly struck, with four Russians killed and two Su-25 aircraft destroyed. Local official Roman Bublik denied any damage. Kursk Vostochny Airport was also targeted. There was no information provided on possible damage. Russia reported no casualties and denied any serious damage, claiming to have intercepted 53 drones. However, the ISW found no visual evidence of Russian aircraft being hit at the airbases.

Russia claimed to have taken the village of Vodiane, near Avdiivka.

Four people were killed and at least 23 others were injured in Russian missile attacks on Zaporizhzhia.

Transnistrian authorities claimed that a drone attack damaged a radar facility in Rîbnița District.

The SBU arrested two foreign nationals from the Caucasus republics in Odesa on suspicion of spying for Russia.

Ukrainian authorities ordered the evacuation of children from 52 settlements in Sumy Oblast due to Russian attacks.

=== 6 April ===
Seven people were killed and 11 others were injured in overnight Russian missile attacks on Kharkiv. Later that day, another attack on the city killed one person. One person was killed in an attack outside Odesa, while three people were killed by shelling in Donetsk Oblast.

Russian forces entered the village of Pervomaiske, ten kilometers west of Avdiivka, and took control of Krasnohorivka. Fighting was also reported north of Avdiivka, at a farmstead on the outskirts of Novokalynove.

Russia claimed to have downed ten missiles over Belgorod Oblast.

Lithuania delivered an unspecified number of M577 tracked armored personnel carriers to Ukraine.

Estonian Defence Minister Hanno Pevkur announced the country's own initiative to purchase one million shells for Ukraine. Similar to the Czech initiative it requires 2–3 billion euros to purchase ammunition, including 155 mm and 152 mm shells and Grad rockets.

=== 7 April ===
Russian shelling killed three in Huliaipole, Zaporizhzhia Oblast. One person was killed in an airstrike in Kupiansk.

The International Atomic Energy Agency (IAEA) reported three direct strikes on the main reactor containment structures of the Zaporizhzhia Nuclear Power Plant, causing "physical impact" in one reactor and one casualty. The HUR denied involvement.

Russia claimed to have shot down 15 Ukrainian drones over Belgorod Oblast, during which falling debris killed one person and wounded four, including two children.

Ukrainian media reported that the Russian Buyan-class corvette Serpukhov was damaged in a fire perpetrated by HUR operatives while it was docked in Kaliningrad Oblast. The HUR released a video of the fire being started and claimed that the fire had destroyed "its communication and automation systems".

Ukraine opened an investigation after video emerged of three prisoners of war being summarily executed by Russian soldiers near Krynky.

=== 8 April ===
Three people were killed and eight others were injured in a Russian missile attack on Zaporizhzhia. One person was killed and five others were injured in Russian air strikes in Sumy Oblast. Two people were killed in separate attacks in Chasiv Yar and Poltava.

Ukrainian hackers launched a cyberattack on a data center used by the Russian military, energy, and telecommunications industries, which affected 10,000 enterprises including Gazprom and Lukoil.

The SBU arrested a former member of the Party of Regions in Sumy Oblast on suspicion of spying for Russia.

=== 9 April ===
Three people, including a 13-year-old child, were killed in a Russian attack on Kostiantynivka. One person was killed by shelling in Chernihiv Oblast.

The IAEA reported a drone strike on the training center of the Zaporizhzhia Nuclear Power Plant.

In Russia, the governor of Bryansk Oblast claimed two people were killed by Ukrainian shelling in Klimovo.

Russian forces claimed to have intercepted a Neptune missile near the Crimean coast and four drones, two over Belgorod Oblast and another two over Voronezh Oblast.

The HUR claimed to have struck the Borisoglebsk Aviation Training School at Borisoglebsk airbase in Voronezh Oblast. CCTV footage, with sound, showed automatic gunfire followed by an explosion at the school.

Rheinmetall announced 20 additional Marder IFVs for Ukraine.

United States Central Command announced that it had transferred weapons seized from Iran to Ukraine, including thousands of rocket launchers, machine guns, sniper rifles and hundreds of thousands of rounds of ammunition.

=== 10 April ===
Three people, including a 14-year-old child, were killed in a Russian airstrike in Lyptsi, Kharkiv Oblast. Six people, including a 10-year-old child, were killed in a Russian airstrike in Odesa.

In Russia, the governor of Kursk Oblast claimed that three people, including two children were killed in a Ukrainian drone strike on a car in Korenevsky District.

The Ukrainian military claimed that a Russian Ka-27 helicopter was destroyed in disputed circumstances over Chornomorske, Crimea. On the same day, the Russian Defence Ministry said that an Mi-24 helicopter crashed due to possible equipment failure off the Crimean coast.

The SBU arrested a former city councilor of Bakhmut on suspicion of collaboration with Russia.

The US Department of Defense sold Ukraine $138 million in spare parts to maintain and upgrade its HAWK missile systems.

Germany announced a new aid package to Ukraine that included 6,000 rounds of 155 mm shells, a mine clearing tank, small arms and some one million bullets.

=== 11 April ===
Russia launched a massive air attack on cities and energy infrastructure across Ukraine, killing five people in Mykolaiv and destroying the Trypilska thermal power plant in Ukrainka, Kyiv Oblast. Two storage facilities belonging to the state gas firm Naftogaz were also targeted. President Zelenskyy said that the power plant was destroyed after air defenses ran out of missiles after intercepting seven Russian missiles, resulting in four other missiles hitting the facility.

The FSB claimed to have thwarted an attempted landing by Ukrainian special forces in occupied Kherson Oblast, inflicting casualties and capturing a commando.

Ukrainian authorities ordered the evacuation of families with children from 47 communities in Kharkiv Oblast near the border with Russia due to Russian attacks.

Ukrainian military commanders convinced the Verkhovna Rada to drop a clause from a bill on mobilization of Ukrainian military personnel that allowed soldiers who had fought for 36 months a chance to be discharged. Citing the ongoing Russian offensive, the officers claimed that the clause would "weaken the defence forces". The bill was passed later in the day after over four thousand amendments were submitted since its introduction in February 2024. It must now be signed into law by Zelenskyy.

The Ukrainian Ground Forces announced that Andrii Kovalchuk, the head of its Operational Command South, had been appointed as head of the Odesa Military Academy, while Serhii Litvinov, the head of its Operational Command West, had been appointed as deputy head of the National Defence University of Ukraine. They were replaced in their previous positions by Major General Hennadii Shapovalov and Brigade General Volodymyr Shvediuk, respectively.

=== 12 April ===
Russian-installed officials in Zaporizhzhia Oblast claimed that ten people were killed by Ukrainian shelling in Tokmak.

One person was killed by Russian shelling in Kharkiv Oblast. Two people were killed in separate Russian attacks in Donetsk Oblast.

Russia reported shooting down four drones over an oil refinery in Novoshakhtinsk. One drone fell in the grounds of the oil refinery. Another drone was reportedly shot down over Belgorod Oblast.

A former SBU agent who defected to Russia shortly before the 2022 invasion was injured in a car bombing in Moscow.

Russia and Ukraine conducted an exchange of war dead, with 99 Ukrainians being exchanged for 23 Russians.

The HUR said that Russia had transferred 2,000 personnel from its Pacific Fleet and 400 personnel from the Russian Air Force's 11th Air and Air Defence Forces Army, in addition to halting the deployment of soldiers to Syria on rotation. It claimed that the transfers will either form new units or fill losses in existing units.

Norway announced that it would transfer 22 F-16s to Ukraine as well as spare parts, simulators and other equipment to operate them.

=== 13 April ===
The Ukrainian Defence Ministry confirmed that Russian forces had reached the northern outskirts of Bohdanivka, ten kilometers from Chasiv Yar. Russia claimed to have taken Pervomaiske, 11 kilometers west of Avdiivka.

Three people were killed in separate Russian attacks in Donetsk Oblast, while two people were killed in Kharkiv Oblast. One person was killed in a Russian attack on a car carrying humanitarian aid in Chernihiv Oblast.

The Russian-installed head of Luhansk Oblast claimed that three people were injured in a Ukrainian missile attack on a factory in Luhansk city. Ukrainian officials claimed to have destroyed a major Russian headquarters using Storm Shadow missiles. Russian media later reported that Colonel Pavel Kropotov, commander of the 59th Guards Communications Brigade, was killed in the attack.

The SBU announced that it had thwarted an assassination attempt against Kherson Oblast Governor Oleksandr Prokudin, adding that it had arrested a suspect who tried to launch a drone at his car.

The IAEA reported that the Zaporizhzhia Nuclear Power Plant had been placed in a state of cold shutdown for the first time since October 2022.

Germany announced that it would deliver another Patriot battery and additional missiles to Ukraine.

=== 14 April ===
One person was killed in a Russian airstrike in Donetsk Oblast. Another person was killed by Russian shelling in Sumy Oblast.

Russia claimed that it had shot down all ten drones launched by Ukraine at Krasnodar Krai.

=== 15 April ===
Four people were killed by Russian shelling in Siversk, Donetsk Oblast. Two people were killed in a separate attack in Lukiantsi, Kharkiv Oblast.

Ukrainian media reported that the Ukrainian military launched a missile attack on a Russian command post in Crimea. The partisan group Atesh claimed that the headquarters of the 810th Marine Brigade in Sevastopol was struck.

Ukrainian border guards intercepted a Russian sabotage group trying to enter Sumy Oblast.

=== 16 April ===
The SBU claimed to have destroyed a Russian Nebo-U radar system in Bryansk Oblast using drones.

Russian-installed officials in Zaporizhzhia Oblast said that Anton Yakimenko, a member of the district council of occupied Yakymivka, was lightly injured in a bomb attack as part of an assassination attempt.

Ukraine announced that it was testing an "unmanned submarine" that can be fitted with a warhead, stealth features and sensors, carry up to 10 divers, carry six torpedoes or missiles and has an endurance of 54 hours/1000 km, with a speed of up to 50 km/h underwater.

Zelenskyy signed the revised mobilization bill into law.

Denmark announced a new military aid package for Ukraine valued at 2.2 billion kroner ($313 million) that is partly aimed at weapons production in the Czech Republic.

=== 17 April ===
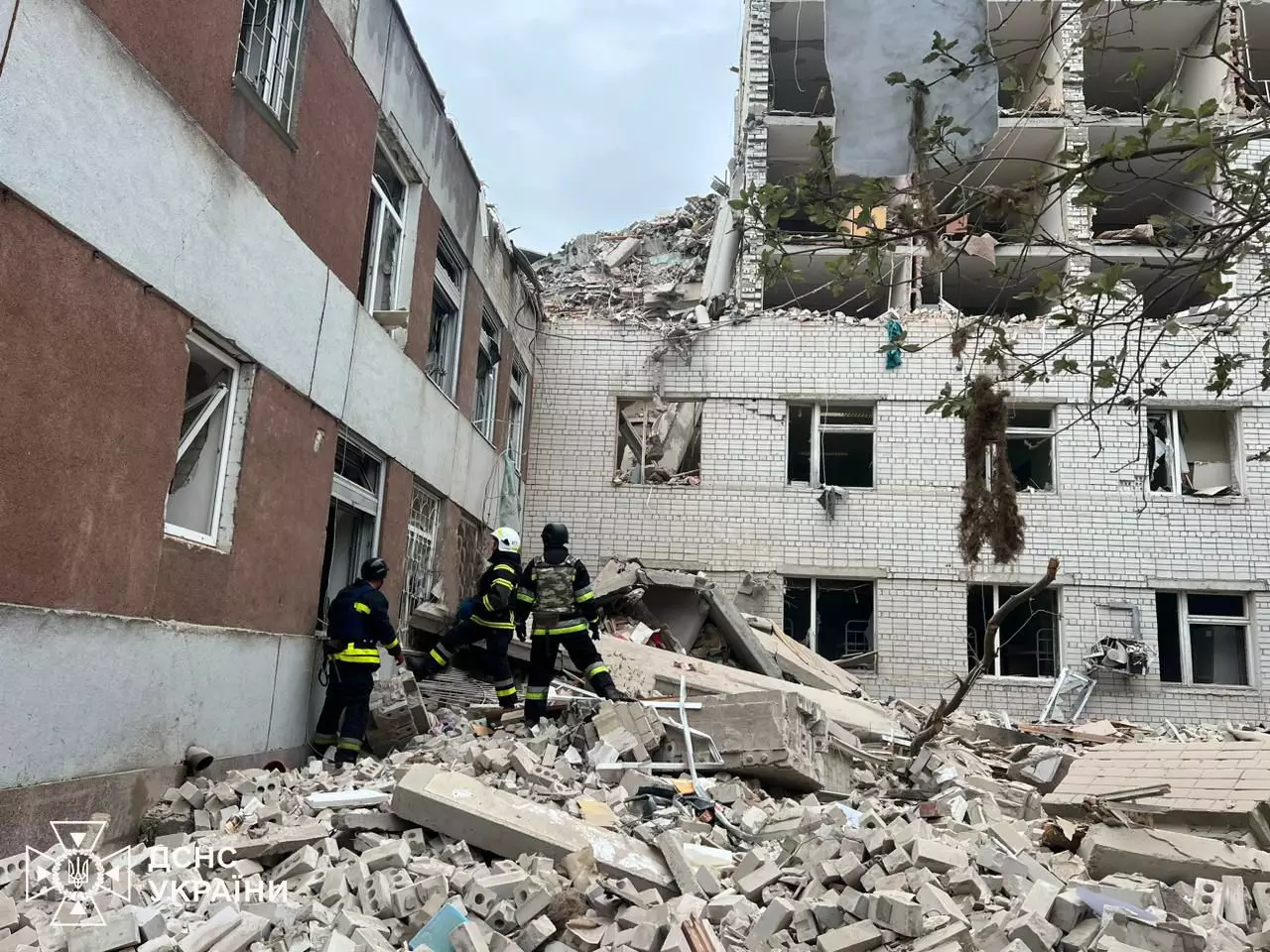
Destruction in Chernihiv after the attack

At least eighteen people were killed and at least 78 others were injured in a Russian missile attack on Chernihiv.

Ukraine claimed responsibility for an attack at the Dzhankoi air base in Crimea, during which six explosions were reported. Russian milbloggers and Ukrainian sources said that ATACMS missiles or ballistic missiles were used, some of which deployed cluster munitions. A milbloggers claimed 30 people were killed and 80 others wounded. Ukraine said four missile launchers were 'critically damaged' in the attack. Subsequent satellite pictures showed the destruction of between three and five S-300 or S-400 systems and other areas marked with "scorch marks" that suggested equipment that had been damaged but removed. Ukrainian media reported that the HUR struck a radar system in the Russian republic of Mordovia and a factory producing bomber aircraft in Tatarstan using drones.

The Canadian government announced that it would budget some 1.6 billion Canadian dollars ($1.16 billion) in military aid for Ukraine over the next five years.

=== 18 April ===
Two people were killed in separate Russian attacks in Donetsk Oblast.

Russia claimed to have shot down five Ukrainian balloons carrying explosives over Belgorod and Voronezh Oblasts.

A Polish national was arrested in Poland on suspicion of spying for Russia as part of a plot to assassinate Zelenskyy during his visit there, following a tip from Ukrainian authorities.

EU foreign policy chief Josep Borrell called on EU member states to send anti-missile systems to Ukraine.

=== 19 April ===
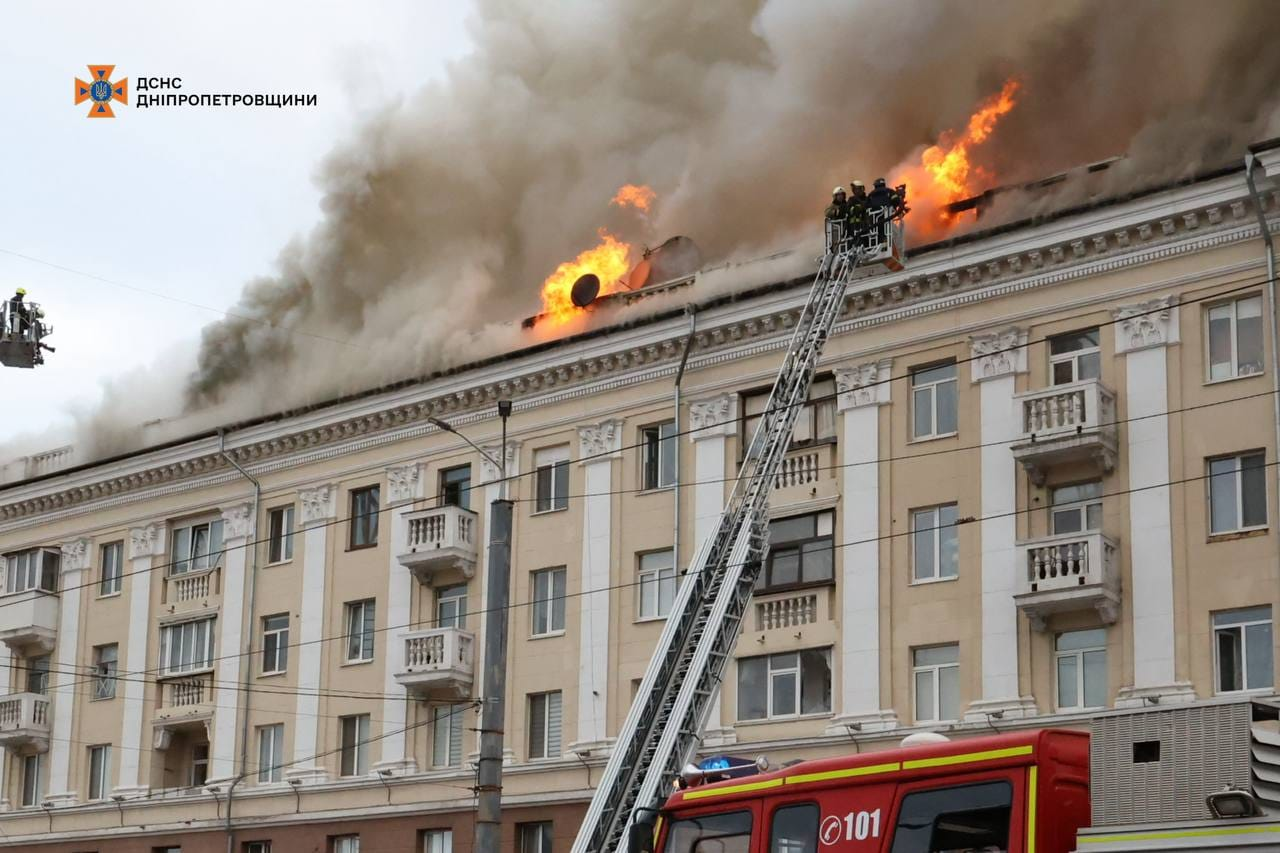
Residential building in Dnipro after the attack

Eight people, including two children, were killed while 29 others were injured in Russian missile attacks on Dnipropetrovsk Oblast, particularly in Dnipro and Synelnykove. A total of 22 missiles and 14 Shahed drones were fired, including six Kh-22 missiles and two Iskander-K missiles; according to Ukraine, 29 were intercepted including two Kh-22s, which were intercepted by the Patriot air defense system, the first time these missiles were intercepted since the start of the invasion.

Two people were killed in separate attacks in Mykolaiv Oblast and Kherson.

A Russian Tupolev Tu-22M3 long range strategic bomber crashed in Stavropol Krai while returning to base, killing one crew member, with another missing. Ukraine claimed to have shot it down, at a range of 308 km, using an S-200 missile, according to an interview with Lt. Gen. Kyrylo Budanov, head of the HUR. Russian authorities claimed the aircraft crashed due to a technical malfunction.

Russian media reported that Russell Bentley, an American citizen and a resident of Donetsk Oblast who fought for pro-Russian separatists during the Donbas War was killed in unspecified circumstances after going missing following a Ukrainian attack on 8 April. His wife claimed that he had been abducted by Russian soldiers.

Russian media outlets claimed that Izvestia war correspondent Semyon Eremin was killed by a Ukrainian drone strike after visiting a Russian unit in Zaporizhzhia Oblast.

Ukraine claimed that the armored strength of the Russian Southern Group of Forces had decreased "significantly" to 650 tanks, including those damaged or otherwise disabled, and total number of AFVs deployed was "no more than" 1,850 vehicles.

=== 20 April ===
Two people were killed in a Russian attack on Vovchansk. One person was killed in a separate attack in Dnipropetrovsk Oblast.

Ukrainian forces claimed responsibility for strikes on Russian energy infrastructure, with fires breaking out in three electrical substations in Smolensk, Kaluga and Bryansk Oblasts. A fuel storage tank belonging to Lukoil was set on fire in Smolensk Oblast by falling drone debris. The Russian ministry of defence claimed to have shot down some fifty drones over the said oblasts as well as in Ryazan, Tula, Moscow, Kursk and Belgorod Oblasts, where two people were claimed to have died.

The US House of Representatives passed a $61 billion aid package for Ukraine. It must be passed by the Senate and signed into law by President Joe Biden.

=== 21 April ===
Russia claimed to have taken Bohdanivka, three kilometers from Chasiv Yar.

The Russian-installed governor of Sevastopol said that a Neptune missile was launched at a vessel of the Russian Black Sea Fleet, causing a small fire. The Ukrainian Navy claimed that it struck the salvage ship Kommuna. Subsequent satellite images did not reveal any damage.

Ukrainian military observer Kostyantyn Mashovets claimed that the Russian Central Grouping of Forces, which operates in the Pokrovsk and Toretsk directions (northwest and northeast of Avdiivka), had over 86,000 personnel, 280 tanks, 760 armored vehicles, and around 1,100 tube and rocket artillery systems.

=== 22 April ===
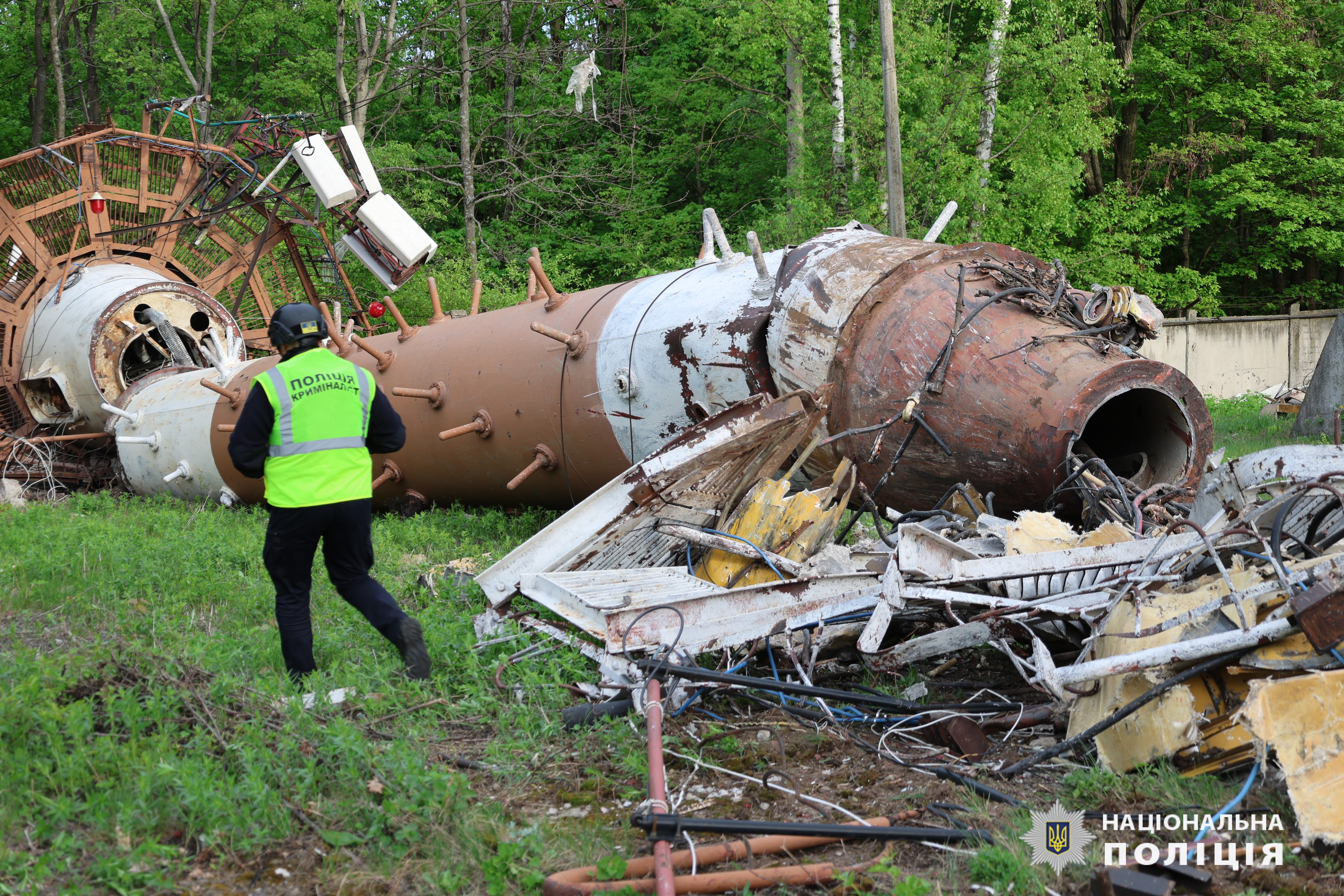
Fragment of Kharkiv TV Tower

Russia claimed to have captured the village of Novomykhailivka, Donetsk Oblast, 20 kilometres from Vuhledar.

The upper half of the Kharkiv TV Tower was destroyed by a Russian air strike.

British intelligence reported that Russian legislator Dmitry Sablin created a new reserve military drone unit called Bars Kaskad to allow VIPs to serve in Ukraine with a reduced risk of "frontline combat".

A crowdfunding effort by 50,000 private Slovak citizens raised €3,071,405 in a week to contribute to the Czech initiative to purchase artillery ammunition for Ukraine.

=== 23 April ===
Russia claimed to have captured the village of Ocheretyne, Donetsk Oblast, which was attributed to a rotational error by Ukrainian military commanders that left the sector mostly undefended and led to Russian forces advancing by five kilometers.

The Ukrainian foreign ministry announced that it would suspend consular services to overseas Ukrainian men who were eligible for military service until 18 May, with the exception of those returning to Ukraine.

The SBU arrested a resident of Kharkiv on suspicion of spying for Russia.

UK Prime Minister Rishi Sunak announced a new military aid package for Ukraine that included 400 vehicles, 1,600 weapons and four million rounds of ammunition, along with £500 million in funding.

The US Senate passed the bill authorising financial aid for Ukraine. The bill must now be signed into law by President Joe Biden.

=== 24 April ===
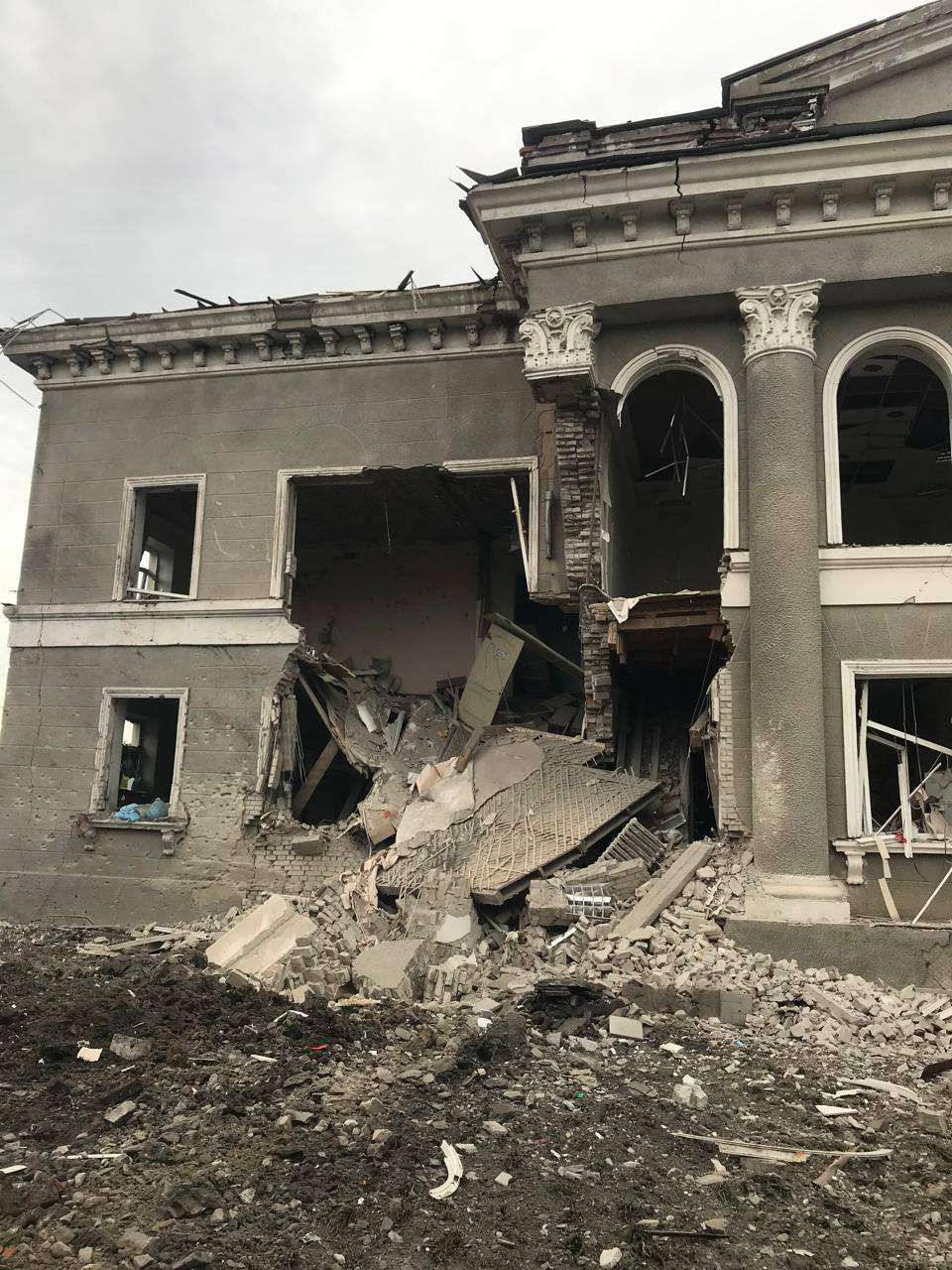
Former building of Zolochiv administration (Kharkiv Oblast) after missile attack on 24 April

Russia claimed that a Ukrainian drone attack set fire to energy infrastructure in Smolensk Oblast. A drone struck an industrial area in Lipetsk Oblast without details on injuries or damage caused, while an oil refinery was also struck in Voronezh Oblast, causing a fire. Ukrainian sources claimed that some 26,000 cubic metres of fuel was destroyed.

The Ukrainian government issued a decree banning the delivery of identification documents and passports to Ukrainian men of military age abroad.

The SBU formally announced that Metropolitan Arsenii, the UOC-MP head of the Sviatohirsk Lavra in Donetsk Oblast, was under suspicion of spying for Russia for divulging Ukrainian military positions during a public liturgy.

Ukraine received another tranche of 1.5 billion euros in funds from the EU.

President Biden signed into law the aid package for Ukraine. The US Department of Defense subsequently announced a $1 billion package that included HIMARS systems, artillery rounds, air defense missiles and Bradley IFVs.

A Russian court ordered the seizure of $439.5 million in funds from JPMorgan Chase to recoup losses from US sanctions.

=== 25 April ===
Three people were killed in Russian attacks in Donetsk Oblast.

Russian-installed officials claimed that four people were killed in separate Ukrainian attacks in Kherson and Zaporizhzhia Oblasts.

Two Russian soldiers were arrested for fatally shooting at least seven people while intoxicated in the villages of Podo-Kalynivka and Abrykosivka in Kherson Oblast, including the head of the latter village.

The Polish and Lithuanian governments offered to repatriate Ukrainian men living in their countries to Ukraine for them to be drafted into the Ukrainian military.

Spain pledged to provide Patriot missiles to Ukraine.

The Swiss Parliament's Security Committee approved a proposal to send five billion Swiss Francs in aid to Ukraine.

Russia seized the village of Novobakhmutivka, ten kilometers northwest of Avdiivka.

=== 26 April ===
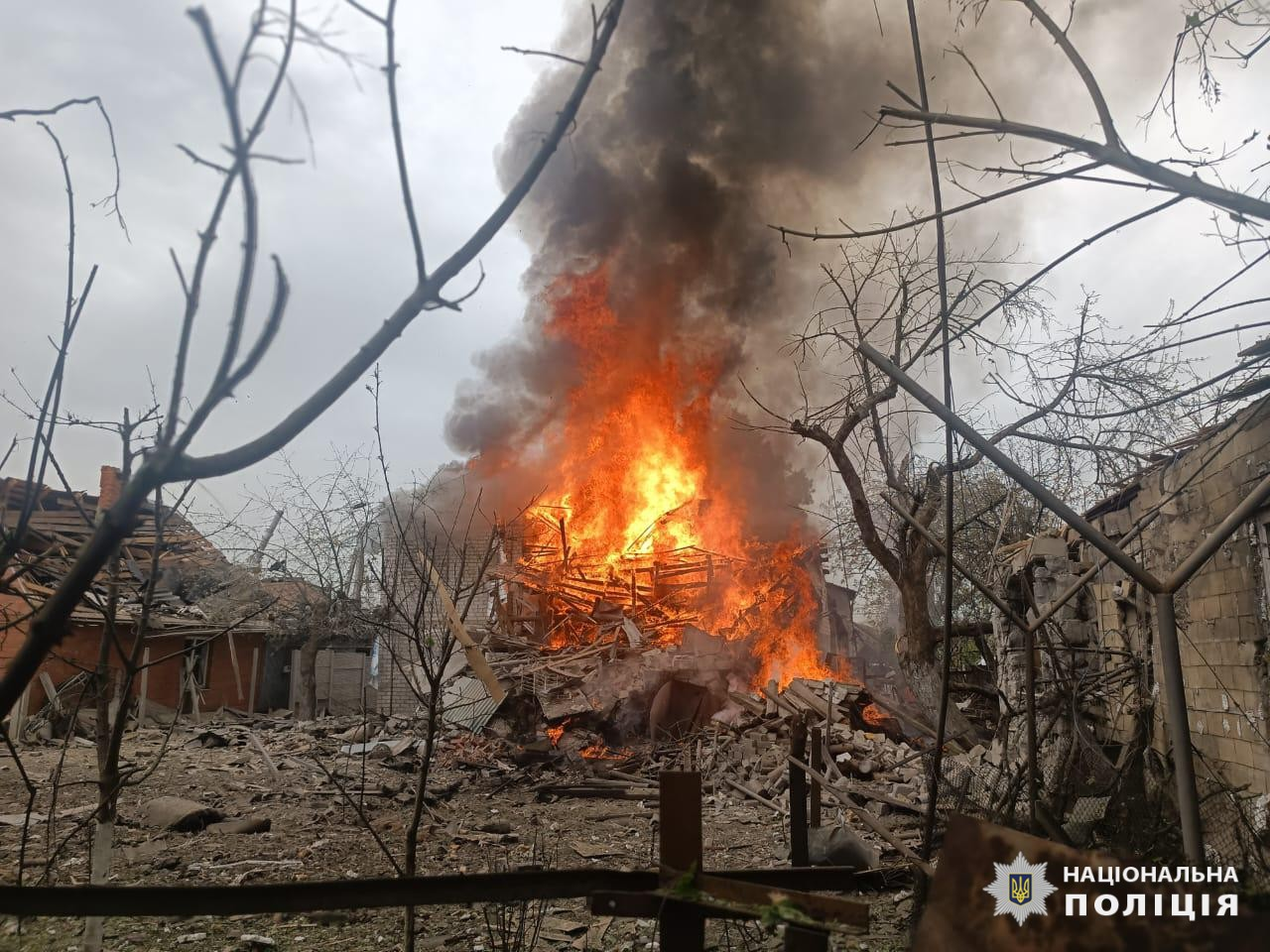
House in Derhachi (Kharkiv Oblast) after bombing on 26 April

Two people were killed by Russian shelling in Bilopillia, Sumy Oblast.

Russian-installed officials in Luhansk Oblast claimed that one person was killed by Ukrainian shelling in Novodruzhesk. The governors of Kursk and Bryansk Oblasts also claimed that two people were killed in separate Ukrainian attacks.

Ukrainian media reported that the HUR carried out an operation that destroyed a Russian Ka-32 helicopter in Ostafyevo Airport, Moscow, and a cyberattack that targeted the United Russia party.

Ukraine withdrew its M1A1 Abrams tanks from frontline service after two months in action. A US Defense official said the withdrawal was due to difficulties in maneuvering undetected through terrain and Russian drone attacks.

Zelenskyy dismissed Brigadier General Oleksandr Yakovets as commander of the Ukrainian military's Support Forces after more than a month in office, and transferred him to head the State Transport Special Service, replacing Bohdan Bondar.

The US government announced a US$6 billion military aid package for Ukraine that included Patriot and NASAMS missiles, counter drone systems, artillery ammunition and other precision strike weapons. US Secretary of Defense Lloyd Austin called it the "largest security assistance package that we've committed to date".

Six photos surfaced online, taken somewhere in Russia, which appeared to show a crashed Swift 2 fitted with a single OFAB-100-120 bomb along with other equipment to allow for it to become a "remotely piloted bomber".

UK Defense Secretary Grant Shapps claimed that Italy had supplied Ukraine with Storm Shadow missiles during an interview with the Sunday Times. The Italian government did not confirm this statement.

=== 27 April ===
Ukraine launched a drone attack in Russia's Krasnodar Krai, causing fires in the Ilsky and Slavyansk-on-Kuban oil refineries with 10 drones attacking the Slavyansk-on-Kuban refinery alone. The Kushchyovskaya airbase was also attacked. A number of KAB glide bomb kits were reportedly destroyed along with possibly one Su-34. The Russian MoD claimed to have shot down 66 drones over Krasnodar Krai and two over Crimea. The distillation column of the Slavyansk-on-Kuban refinery was also reported damaged, forcing it to partially suspend operations. The HUR also claimed to have hit a Russian Podlet-K1 radar used to coordinate S-300/400 missile systems.

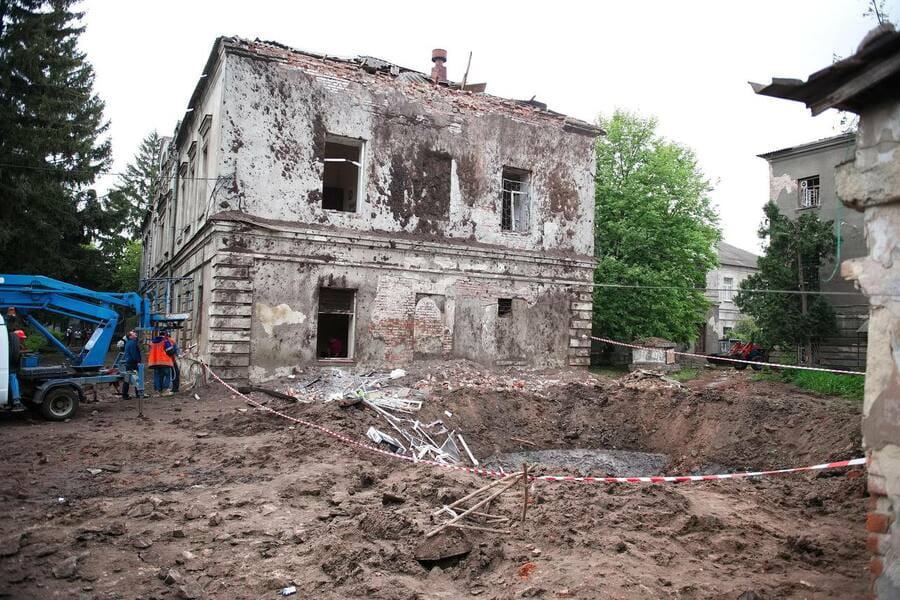
Crater between the buildings of regional psychiatric hospital in Kharkiv

Ukraine claimed that two S-300 missiles hit a hospital in Kharkiv, injuring one man. The Ukrainian Air Force claimed to have intercepted 21 out of 34 Russian missiles. Attacks severely damaged equipment at four thermal power plants in Dnipropetrovsk, Ivano-Frankivsk, and Lviv Oblasts causing blackouts. Two people were injured in Kryvyi Rih.

During a visit to Lviv, Australian Defence Minister Richard Marles announced a $100 million AUD military aid package for Ukraine that included drones, short range air defences, air dropped precision munitions and other "high-priority equipment".

Two Ukrainian soldiers were killed in a stabbing attack by a Russian national in Murnau am See, Germany, in what authorities said may have been a politically motivated attack.

=== 28 April ===
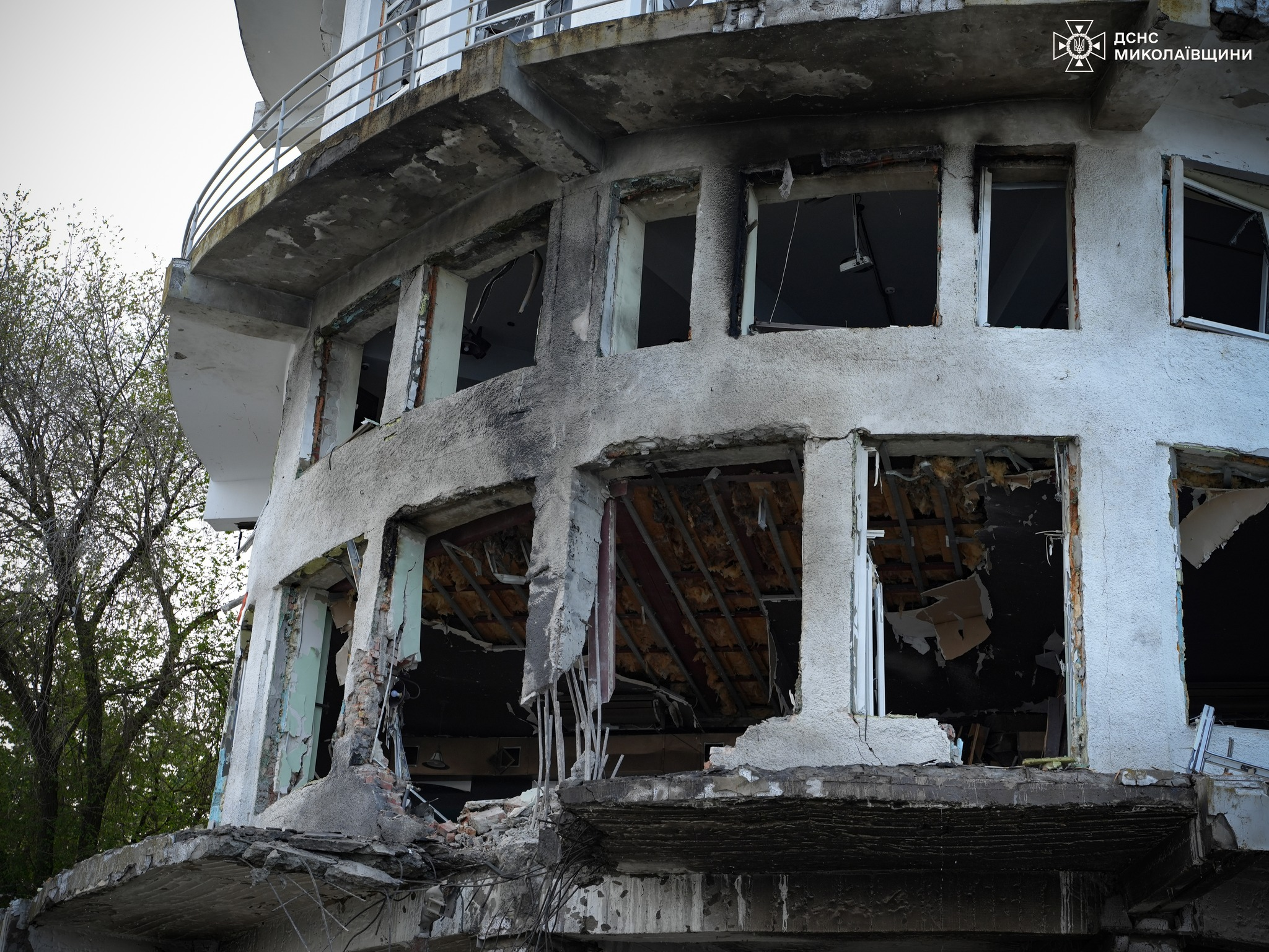
Hotel in Mykolaiv, shelled on 28 April

Commander-in-Chief of the Ukrainian Armed Forces Oleksandr Syrskyi confirmed that Ukrainian forces had retreated from the villages of Berdychi, Semenivka, and Novomykhailivka in Donetsk Oblast. He also said that Ukrainian forces had regained control of Nestryha Island in the Dnipro River delta in Kherson Oblast. The ISW assessed that Ukrainian soldiers suffered a "one-to-three manpower disadvantage" northwest of Avdiivka.

Russia claimed to have shot down 17 drones over Belgorod, Kursk, Kaluga and Bryansk Oblasts.

Russian milbloggers claimed that Ukraine conducted an unsuccessful ATACMS strike on Russian air defense units at Cape Tarkhankut, Crimea.

Ukraine announced that it would partially suspend its adherence to the European Convention on Human Rights to be able to fully apply martial law on its territory.

=== 29 April ===
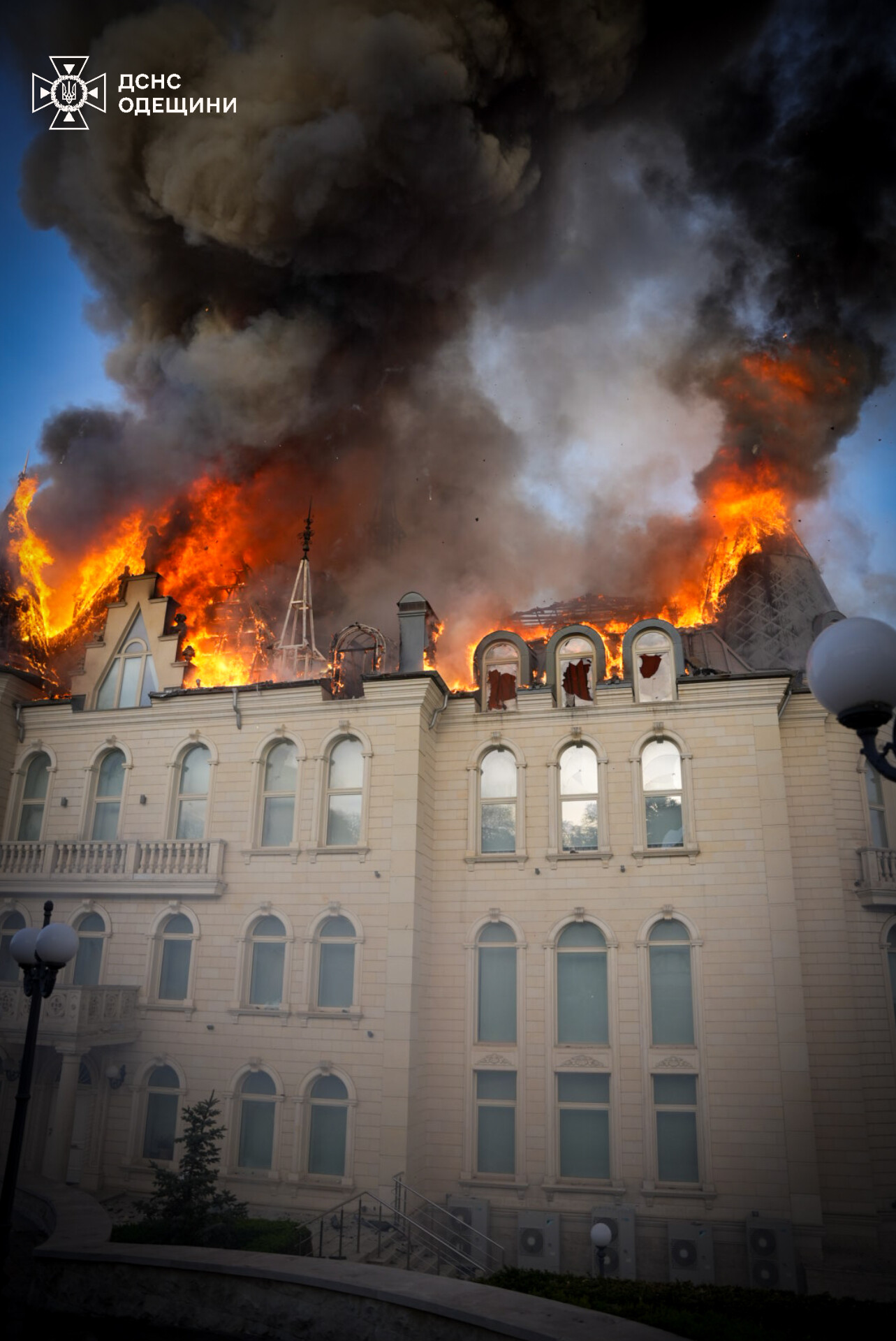
Palace of Students of Odesa Law Academy after the strike

Seven people were killed in a Russian missile attack on Odesa. One person was killed in a separate attack in Kherson Oblast.

Russia claimed to have taken the village of Semenivka, five kilometers west of Avdiivka.

NATO Secretary-General Jens Stoltenberg visited Kyiv and apologised for delayed weapons shipments from the bloc.

The HUR claimed that some 18,000 Russian soldiers had deserted the Southern Military District, including 2,000 contract and 10,000 mobilised soldiers.

=== 30 April ===
Three people were killed in a Russian missile attack on Odesa. Russia subsequently claimed that it had struck the headquarters of the Ukrainian Operational Command South in the city. One person was killed in a Russian airstrike in Kharkiv.

Russian-installed officials in southern Ukraine claimed that several Ukrainian missiles were shot down by air defenses over Crimea.

The SBU arrested two people in Kyiv on suspicion of impersonating security officials on social media and establishing a bot farm as part of a Russian disinformation campaign.

Germany announced a new military aid package for Ukraine, including a Skynex air defense system, missiles for the IRIS-T launchers, ammunition for Leopard 2 tanks, Gepard ammunition, 155 mm shells, small arms ammunition, grenade launchers, mine clearing equipment, bridge laying and first aid supplies. Latvia also pledged another military aid package that included anti-aircraft guns and tactical unmanned surveillance systems.

Lithuania announced its support for repatriating Ukrainian military-aged men to be mobilised. Andriy Demchenko, head of the State Border Guard Service of Ukraine, said that 30 Ukrainians had died trying to leave the country since the invasion began.

== May 2024 ==
=== 1 May ===
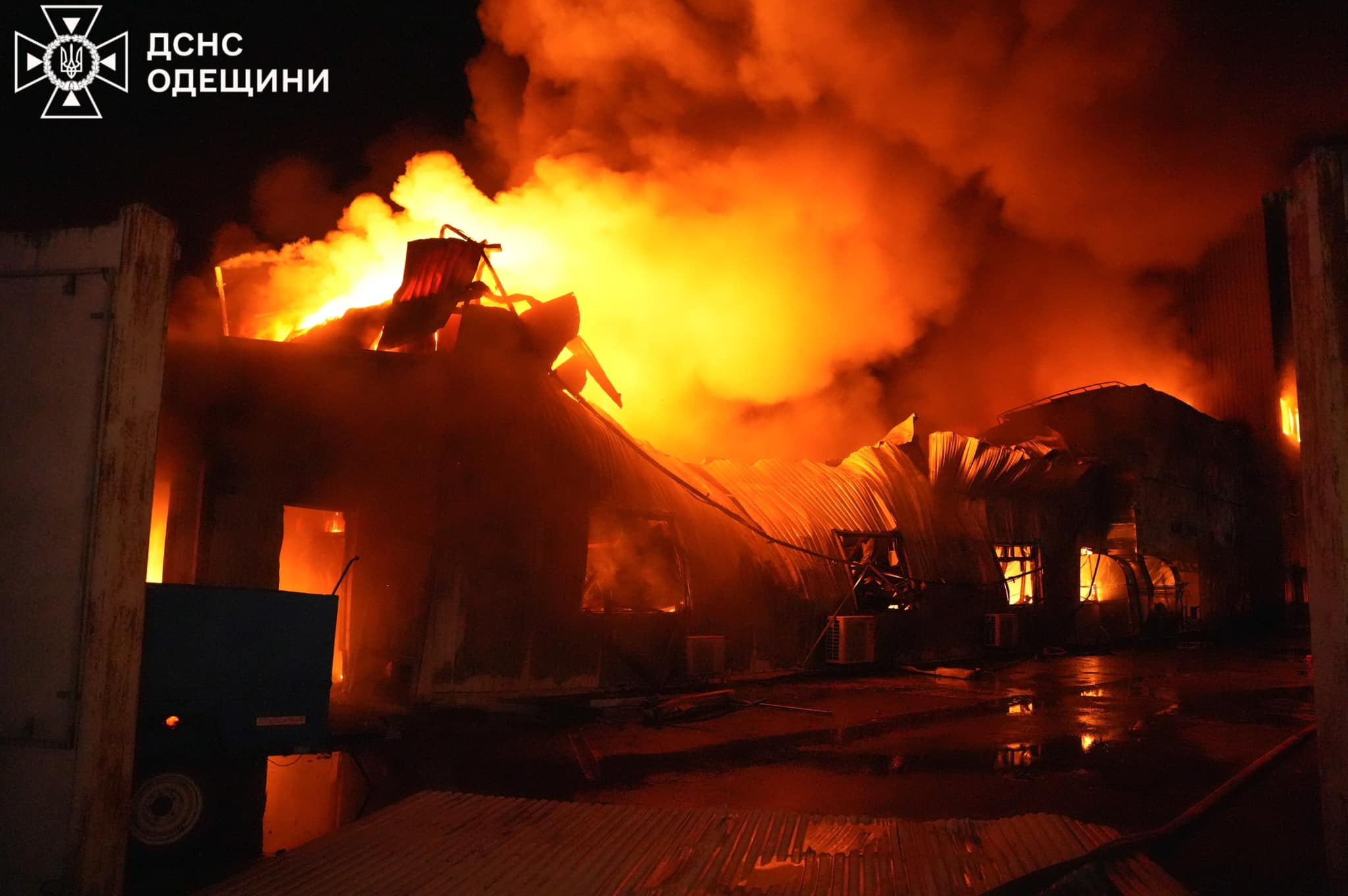
Sorting depot of Nova Poshta in Odesa after the strike

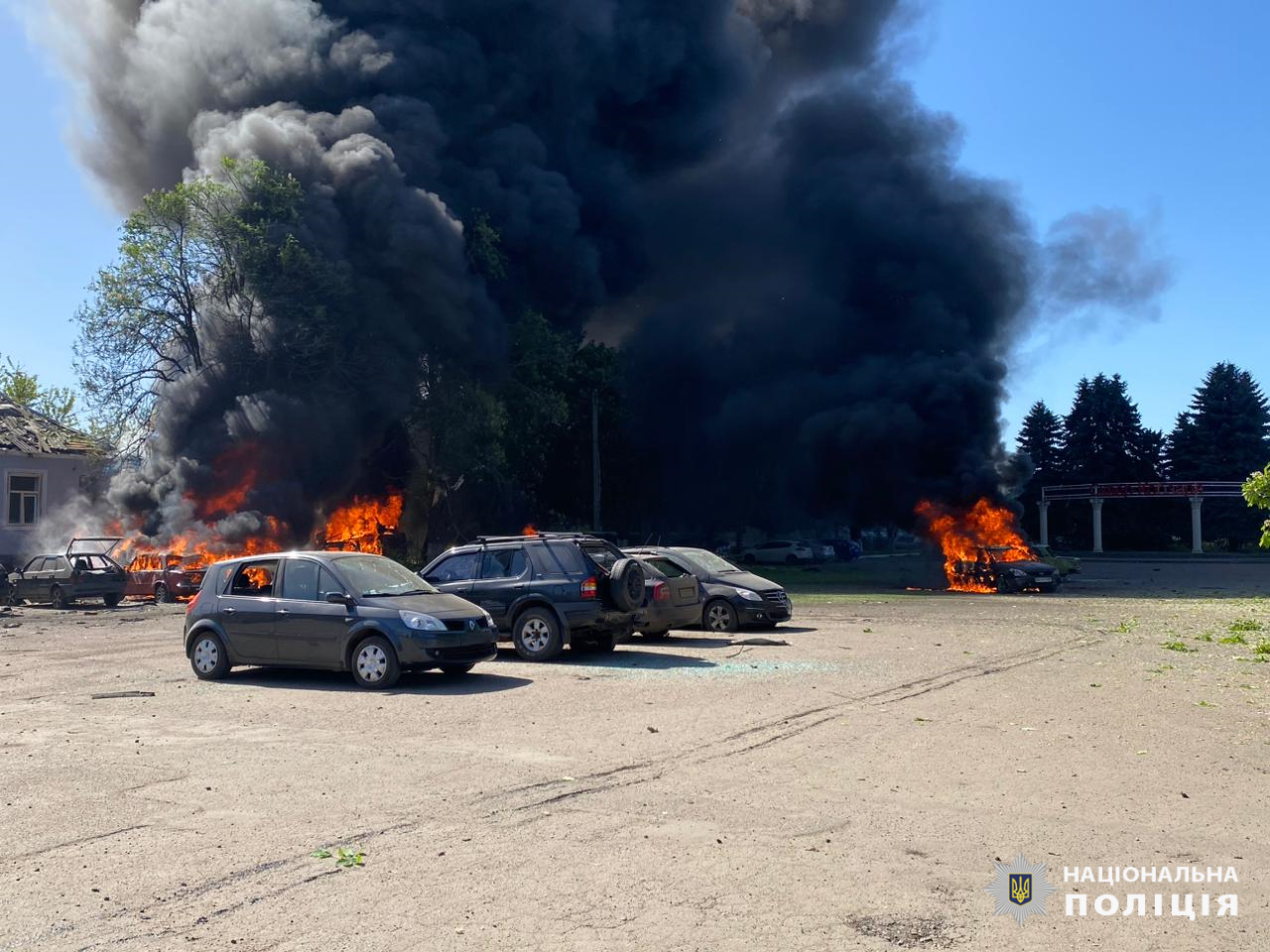
Burning cars in Zolochiv after bombing

Two people were killed in a Russian airstrike in Zolochiv, Kharkiv Oblast. Two people were also killed in a Russian missile strike in Hirnyk, Donetsk Oblast. A missile strike on Odesa injured 14 people.

In Russia, the governor of Ryazan Oblast claimed that an oil refinery was set on fire by a drone. The governor of Voronezh Oblast claimed that a drone was shot down over Voronezh city, while energy infrastructure was also damaged by drones in Kursk and Oryol Oblasts.

Ukrainian special forces claimed to have disabled two Russian Buk missile systems in Sumy Oblast using attack drones. Several Russian personnel were claimed killed and equipment destroyed during a Ukrainian strike on Rohove, Luhansk Oblast. It is believed three missiles, either ATACMS or Tochka-U, were used with cluster munitions.

The head of the SBU's cybersecurity unit, Illia Vitiuk, was dismissed by Zelenskyy following investigations into suspicious financial activities by the former's wife while he was in office and attempts by SBU personnel to harass journalists.

The United States Department of State alleged the use of chloropicrin by Russian forces in Ukraine and imposed fresh sanctions against Russian individuals and entities as a response.

Russia placed several captured and destroyed Western armored vehicles on display at Moscow, including an M1A1 Abrams, M2A2 Bradley, Leopard 2A6 and several types of lighter NATO-origin armored vehicles.

=== 2 May ===
Russia claimed to have taken Berdychi, near Avdiivka. It also claimed to have shot down a drone over Crimea.

Two people were killed in separate Russian attacks in Donetsk and Kharkiv Oblasts.

=== 3 May ===
French president Emmanuel Macron announced he would consider sending French troops to Ukraine "if the Russians were to break through the front lines" or if Ukraine were to request it.

In Donetsk Oblast, three people were killed by Russian attacks in Kurakhove and Chasiv Yar, while one person was killed in a separate attack in Kharkiv.

In Russia, the governor of Belgorod Oblast claimed that two people were injured by Ukrainian drone strikes in Voznesenovka and Shebekino.

The HUR claimed the destruction of two Russian locomotives by fire over the last few days: one in Orenburg, the other in Vladikavkaz. Ukrainian media also reported that the agency carried out a cyberattack on internet providers and mobile operators in Tatarstan.

The SBU arrested a resident of Kharkiv on suspicion of spying for Russia.

The FSB claimed to have "liquidated" an agent working for the HUR who was plotting to carry out terrorist attacks against "military and energy objects" in Moscow and Leningrad Oblasts.

The US announced plans to purchase new sensors for the JDAM-ER for Ukraine, which are designed to locate and destroy Russian GPS jammers.

=== 4 May ===
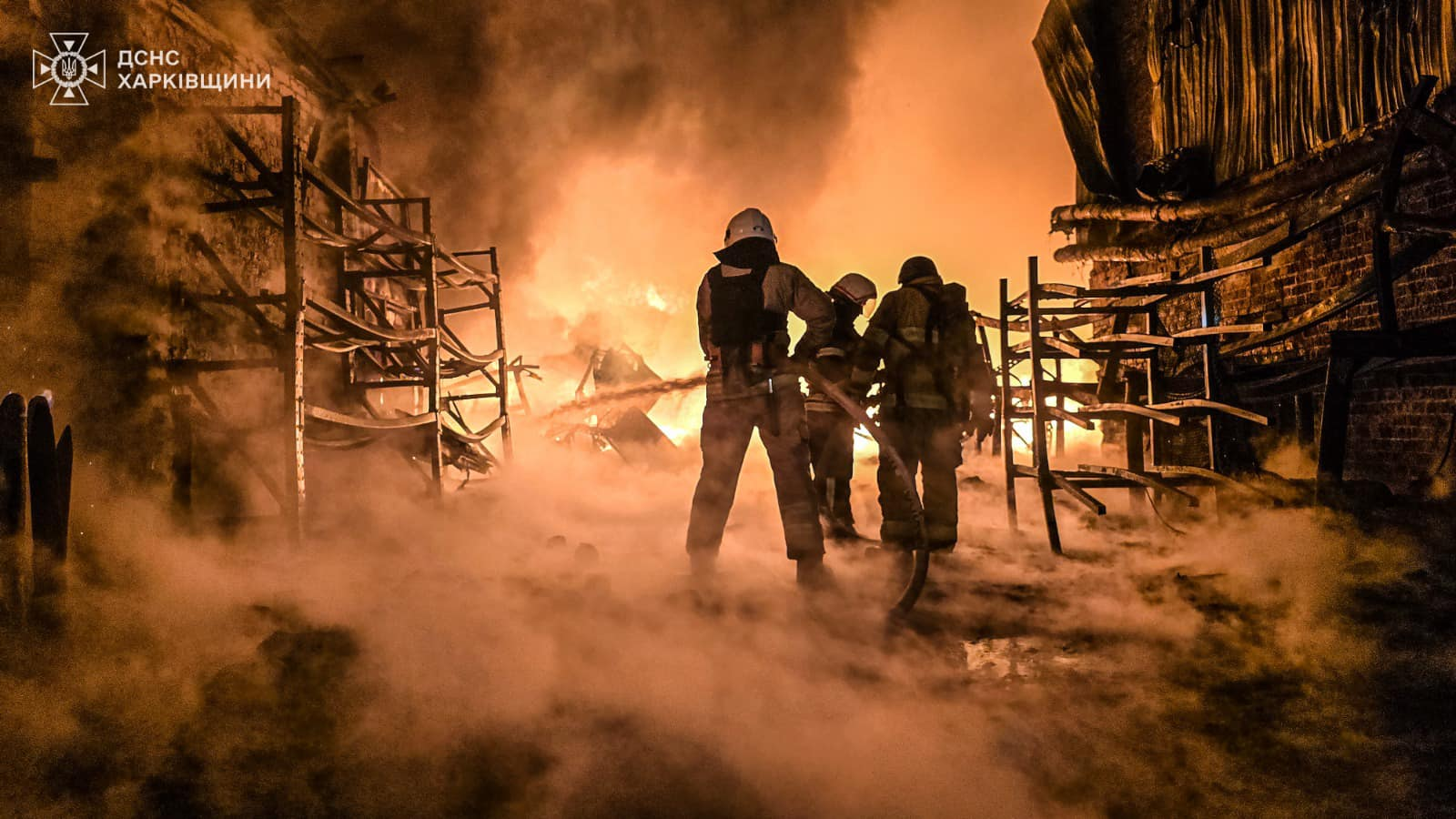
Fire in a warehouse in Kharkiv after the strike on 4 May

The Russian interior ministry placed Zelenskyy in its list of wanted criminals.

Ukraine claimed to have shot down a Russian Su-25 fighter jet over Donetsk Oblast.

The Russian defence ministry claimed to have shot four ATACMS missiles over Crimea.

A court in Russia sentenced a Ukrainian POW captured during the Siege of Mariupol to 18 years imprisonment for membership in the Azov Battalion.

=== 5 May ===
In Berdiansk, Yevgeniy Ananievsky, a Russian-appointed official allegedly responsible for setting up torture chambers in occupied Zaporizhzhia Oblast, was killed after a bomb exploded in his car.

Two people were killed by Russian rockets in Pokrovsk. One person was killed by Russian shelling in Kharkiv Oblast. The Sloviansk Thermal Power Plant in Donetsk Oblast was also damaged by Russian shelling.

Ukrainian former Olympic weightlifter turned soldier Oleksandr Pielieshenko was killed in action.

=== 6 May ===
In Russia, the governor of Belgorod Oblast claimed that eight people were killed and 35 others were injured in a Ukrainian drone strike that hit three vehicles in the village of Berezovka.

Russia claimed to have taken the villages of Soloviove in Donetsk Oblast and Kotliarivka in Kharkiv Oblast, 20 kilometers from Kupiansk.

Ukraine claimed to have destroyed a Russian military fast attack craft in Crimea using a naval drone.

Ukrainian forces claimed a series of successful counterattacks against Russian forces near Bakhmut, resulting in an advance of some 500 metres, and inflicting casualties on Russian soldiers and the destruction of four supply trucks, a BMP-2, and a BMD-4 using drones.

Russia released footage of a Ka-29 opening fire on a Sea Baby drone armed with a R-73 infrared missile to defend it from helicopters. One missile appeared to have been fired before it was destroyed by gunfire.

In response to perceived threats from France, Britain, and the United States, Russia announced it would practice the deployment of tactical nuclear weapons as part of a military exercise.

=== 7 May ===
The SBU announced that it had foiled a Russian plot to assassinate Zelenskyy and several senior Ukrainian military leaders and arrested two Ukrainian government protection unit colonels on suspicion of involvement.

One person was killed by Russian shelling in Sumy Oblast.

Russian-installed officials in Luhansk claimed that five people were injured in a fire caused by a Ukrainian missile strike on an oil depot.

Ukrainian media reported that the HUR carried out a cyberattack on the Russian software firm 1C Company.

=== 8 May ===
The Verkhovna Rada passed a bill allowing for the voluntary mobilization of convicts into the Ukrainian Armed Forces for a chance at parole. Those convicted of violent crimes, treason, rape, terrorism or drug dealing would be barred from volunteering. The bill requires Zelenskyy's signature to become law. Ukrainian Justice Minister Denys Maliuska subsequently said in an interview that between 10,000 and 20,000 convicts could be recruited if the bill is signed into law.

One person was killed by Russian shelling in Kherson Oblast.

Russia claimed to have taken the villages of Kyslivka in Kharkiv Oblast, 20 kilometers from Kupiansk, and Novokalynove, ten kilometers north of Avdiivka. The Ukrainian military confirmed that Russian forces had entered Krasnohorivka and were holed up in the town's refractory plant. A spokesman for Ukraine's Khortytsia operational-strategic group said that its units, mainly the 59th Brigade, had blocked the Russians inside the refractory plant and claimed to have killed 30 Russians over the past day.

The governor of Kharkiv Oblast, Oleh Syniehubov, reported a large gathering of Russian forces north of the region.

A jury-rigged Kh-101 modified with a second high explosive warhead containing steel fragments was shot down over Ukraine.

The EU agreed to donate €3 billion in income from frozen Russian assets to Ukraine "for arms purchases and reconstruction".

The head of the Ukrainian Defense Industry claimed that Ukraine's production of suicide drones identical to Shahed 131s and Shahed 136s had caught up with Russia's production of Shahed drones. He also claimed that Ukrainian manufacturing reached parity with Russia's production of other strike drones, and that Ukrainian forces have already used domestically produced drones similar to Russia's Lancet drones.

=== 9 May ===
Two people were killed by Russian shelling in Nikopol.

In Russia, the governor of Belgorod Oblast claimed that eight people were injured in a Ukrainian airstrike in Belgorod city. A drone attack on Krasnodar also set a fuel depot on fire. A drone strike was also reported in an oil refinery in Salavat in the first such incident of its kind in the constituent republic of Bashkortostan. The drone used in the attack on Bashkiria was conducted by a drone light aircraft, make unknown, that travelled some 1,500 km.

The SBU arrested a resident of Kharkiv on suspicion of spying for Russia. It also claimed to have arrested several individuals in Kyiv on suspicion of attempting to set off bombs on behalf of Russia.

Zelenskyy implemented a number of changes in the Ukrainian defense apparatus. He appointed Brigadier General Oleksandr Trepak as commander of the Ukrainian Special Operations Forces, replacing Colonel Serhii Lupanchuk. He also dismissed Valeriy Zaluzhnyi, former commander-in-chief of Ukraine's Armed Forces, from military service "on health grounds", and reappointed Dmytro Hereha as the commander of the Ukrainian Support Forces after replacing him with Oleksandr Yakovets in March 2024. Zelenskyy also dismissed Serhii Rud as director of the State Security Administration. Two colonels were also arrested after being accused of being agents for the Russian FSB.

The US Army announced that it would supply three additional HIMARS units paid for by Germany to Ukraine.

=== 10 May ===
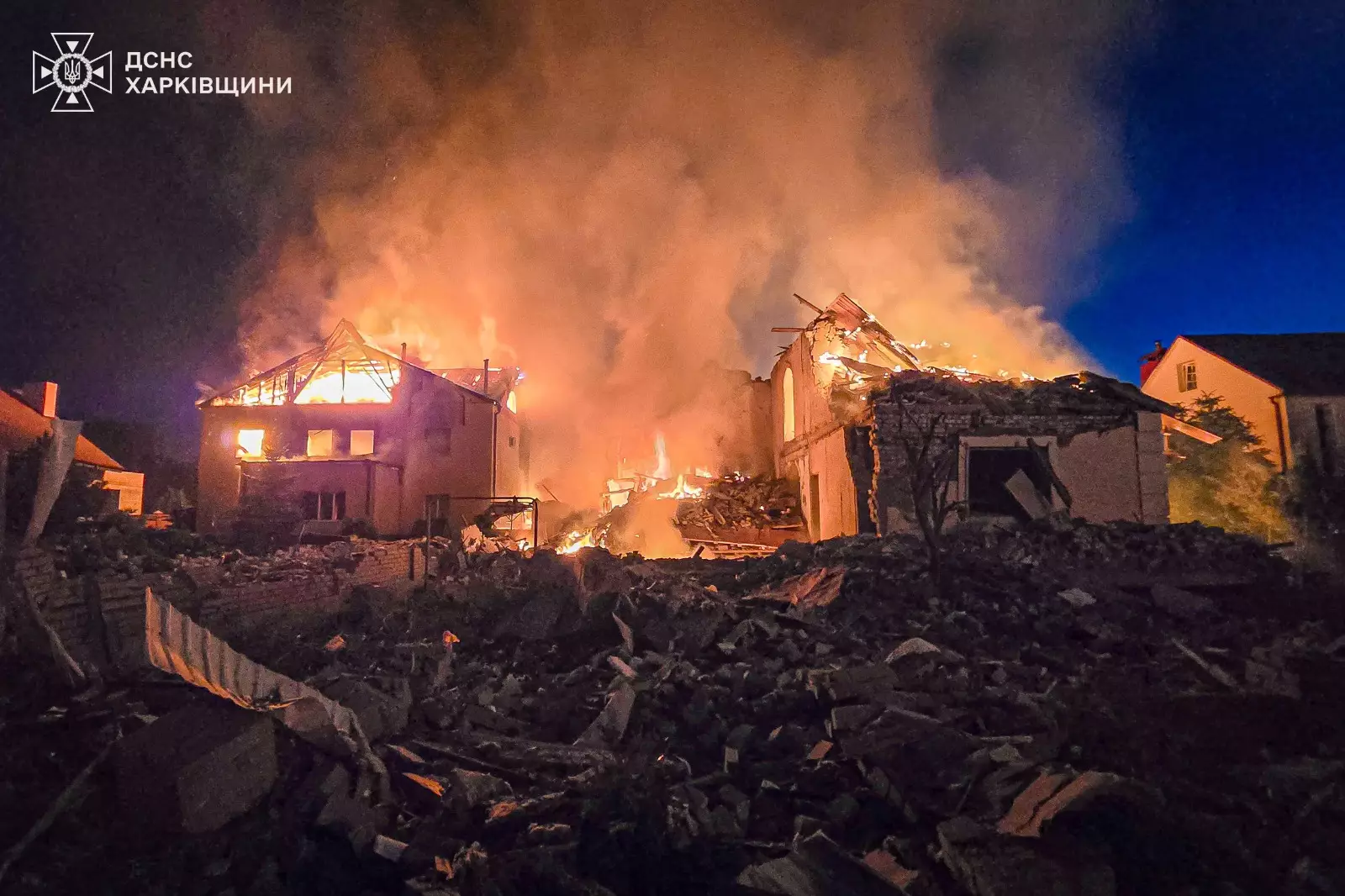
Houses in Kharkiv after missile attack on 10 May

Russia launched an offensive in Kharkiv Oblast, pushing Ukrainian forces back one kilometer from the international border. Heavy shelling was reported in Vovchansk. Five villages (Strilecha, Krasne, Pylna, Borysivka and Ohirtseve) were reported to have been taken by Russia, while fighting was ongoing in the villages of Pletenivka and Hatyshche. At least two civilians were killed in Russian attacks. During a press conference with Slovak President Zuzana Čaputová, Zelenskyy acknowledged the Russian offensive, but said that "Ukraine met them there with our troops, brigades, and artillery."

One person was killed by Russian shelling in Sumy Oblast. Two people were killed in separate Russian attacks in Donetsk Oblast.

Russian-installed officials in Luhansk Oblast claimed that three people were killed and seven others injured in a drone strike on the Rovenky oil depot.

Ukrainian media reported that the HUR carried out a drone strike on an oil refinery in Russia's Kaluga Oblast. Russian officials also claimed that drone strikes caused damage in Belgorod and Kursk Oblasts.

The Czech Republic delivered an F-16 fighter jet simulator to Ukraine.

=== 11 May ===
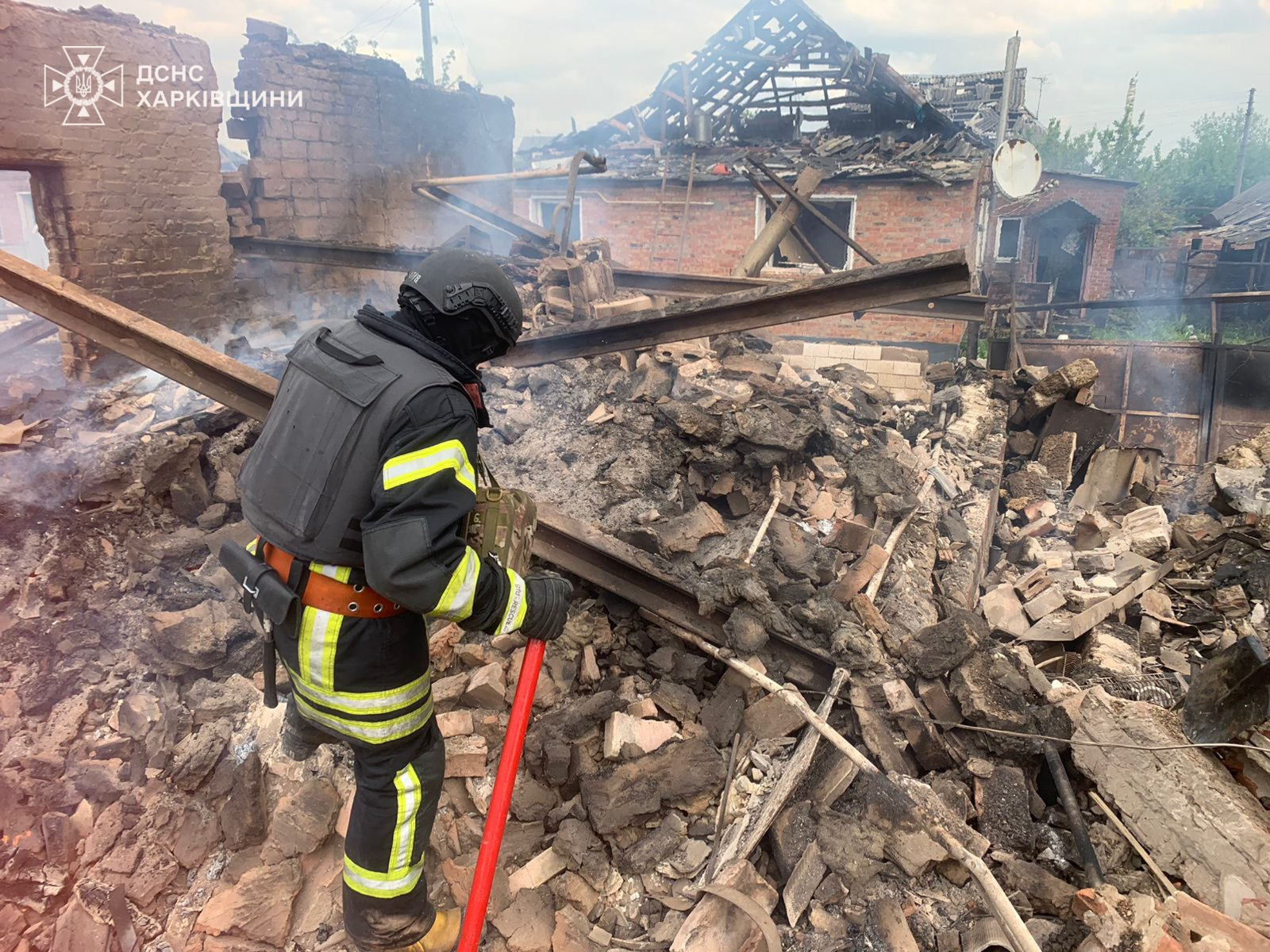
Destroyed houses in Vovchansk after shelling on 11 May

Russia claimed to have taken the village of Keramik in Donetsk Oblast.

Ukraine claimed to have shot down a Russian Su-25 fighter jet over Donetsk Oblast.

Two people were killed by Russian bombing in Vovchansk. One person was killed in a missile strike in Sumy.

In Russia, drones were reported over Belgorod and Kursk Oblasts. Several projectiles were shot down but debris left "several dozen" private homes, mostly smashed windows, and cars damaged. Russian officials subsequently claimed that five people were killed and nine injured by drone strikes in Belgorod, Kursk and Donetsk Oblasts.

A Russian Iskander missile struck a Ukrainian forward arming and refuelling point in Pavlohrad, Donetsk Oblast. Two Mi-24s and a Mi-17 helicopter which had just landed were seriously damaged.

Video was released of a Russian drone striking a Ukrainian Buk-M1 missile system which appeared to have been fitted with US made RIM-7 Sea Sparrow missiles instead of the original 9M38 missiles.

=== 12 May ===
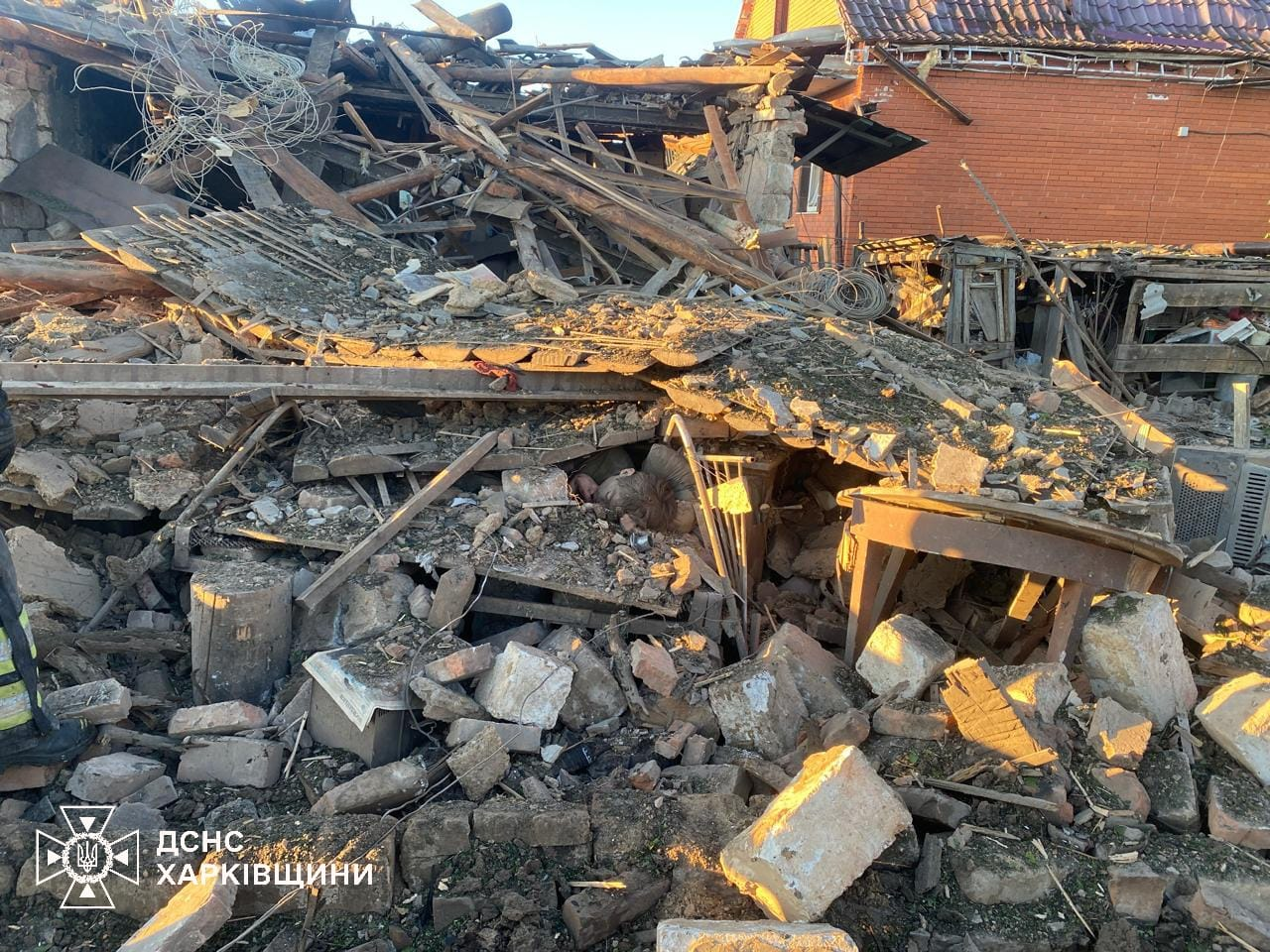
A man under the rubble of a destroyed house in Vovchansk

Russia claimed to have taken the villages of Hatyshche, Krasne, Morokhovets, and Oliinykove in Kharkiv Oblast.

In Russia, the governor of Volgograd Oblast, Andrey Bocharov, claimed that a Ukrainian drone started a fire at an oil refinery, which was put out without any casualties. In Belgorod, officials claimed that 16 people were killed and 27 others were injured when a fragment of a Tochka-U struck an apartment building, according to the Russian Defence Ministry, which also claimed to have shot down several missiles over Belgorod Oblast. Ukrainian media later reported that the HUR carried out drone strikes in Volgograd, Lipetsk and Kaluga Oblasts.

One person was killed by Russian shelling in Sumy Oblast.

Officials reported that Ukraine's seaborne grain exports had recovered to close to their prewar level.

The Kremlin announced the appointment of economist and Deputy Prime Minister Andrey Belousov as Defence Minister, replacing Sergei Shoigu who was transferred to become secretary of the Security Council of Russia.

=== 13 May ===
Ukrainian outlet Rubryka reported that the DeepState map indicated that Russian forces had taken control over the village of Zelene, while the village of Lukiantsi was almost wholly occupied. Ukrainian forces meanwhile claimed to have killed over 100 Russian soldiers in the last 24 hours in northern Kharkiv Oblast. Some five Russian battalions were reported to be involved in Vovchansk. Ukrainian officials acknowledged that Russian forces had made "tactical gains". Russian forces subsequently claimed to have entered Vovchansk.

An explosion was reported in Sorokyne, occupied Luhansk Oblast, with the Russian-installed governor claiming the deaths of three people in what he called a missile strike and the Ukrainian-installed governor attributing it to an explosion at an ammunition depot.

Russia claimed to have shot down 31 drones over Crimea and Lipetsk, Belgorod, and Kursk Oblasts, which also led to the closure of the Crimean Bridge for several hours after the Russian Defence Ministry claimed that four Storm Shadow missiles and seven drones were shot down over Crimea. Ukrainian media reported that the SBU was behind the strikes. Russian officials claimed that one person was killed in Kursk Oblast.

Denis Kharitonov, a member of the Astrakhan Oblast legislature from the United Russia party, claimed to have survived a car bombing while driving as a soldier in occupied Ukraine.

Ukrainian forces claimed to have shot down a Russian Ka-52 helicopter and an Su-25 jet over Donetsk Oblast.

=== 14 May ===
Two people were killed by Russian shelling in the Vovchansk area.

Russian state media reported that a drone strike derailed a freight train at Kotluban station in Volgograd Oblast. A storage tank carrying diesel caught fire, another exploded and nine rail cars were derailed. Russian Railways said the derailment was a result of "interference by unauthorised persons". No injuries were reported.

At least 20 people were injured and fires erupted after a series of Russian airstrikes using new UMPB D-30 glide bombs on residential areas of Kharkiv.

French Minister of the Armed Forces Sebastien Lecornu announced another batch of Aster surface-to-air missiles for the Franco-Italian SAMP/T-MAMBA air defenses defending Kyiv.

=== 15 May ===
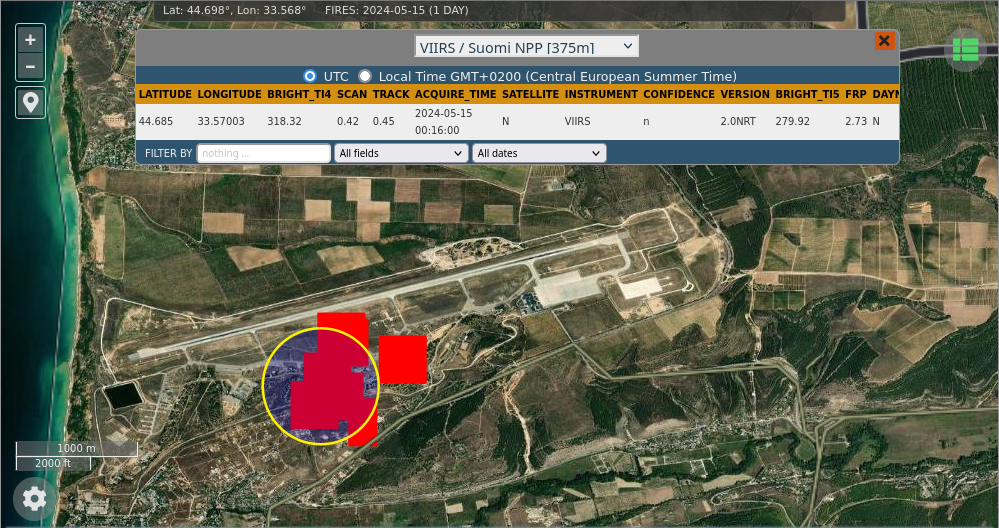
NASA's FIRMS imagery from 15 May 00:16:00 (UTC) showing fires at Belbek Air Base

Russian-installed officials in Crimea claimed that a missile attack caused explosions and fires in Sevastopol, adding that air defenses shot down 10 ATACMS missiles over the Black Sea and near Belbek Air Base. Other reports indicated that some missiles struck dropping cluster munitions on the airfield, destroying at least two Russian ground-based air defense systems, two MiG-31s and a fuel farm. An Su-27 was also damaged.

Two drones struck an oil refinery in Proletarsky District, Rostov Oblast, Russia, causing explosions according to the local governor. However no fire was started and there were no casualties. The Russian Defence Ministry claimed to have intercepted various drones, rockets and missiles fired at Belgorod Oblast, which injured two people. Drones were downed over Kursk and Bryansk Oblasts as well as in Tatarstan.

Two railway workers were killed by Russian shelling of railway infrastructure in Dnipropetrovsk Oblast. One person was killed by shelling in Sumy Oblast.

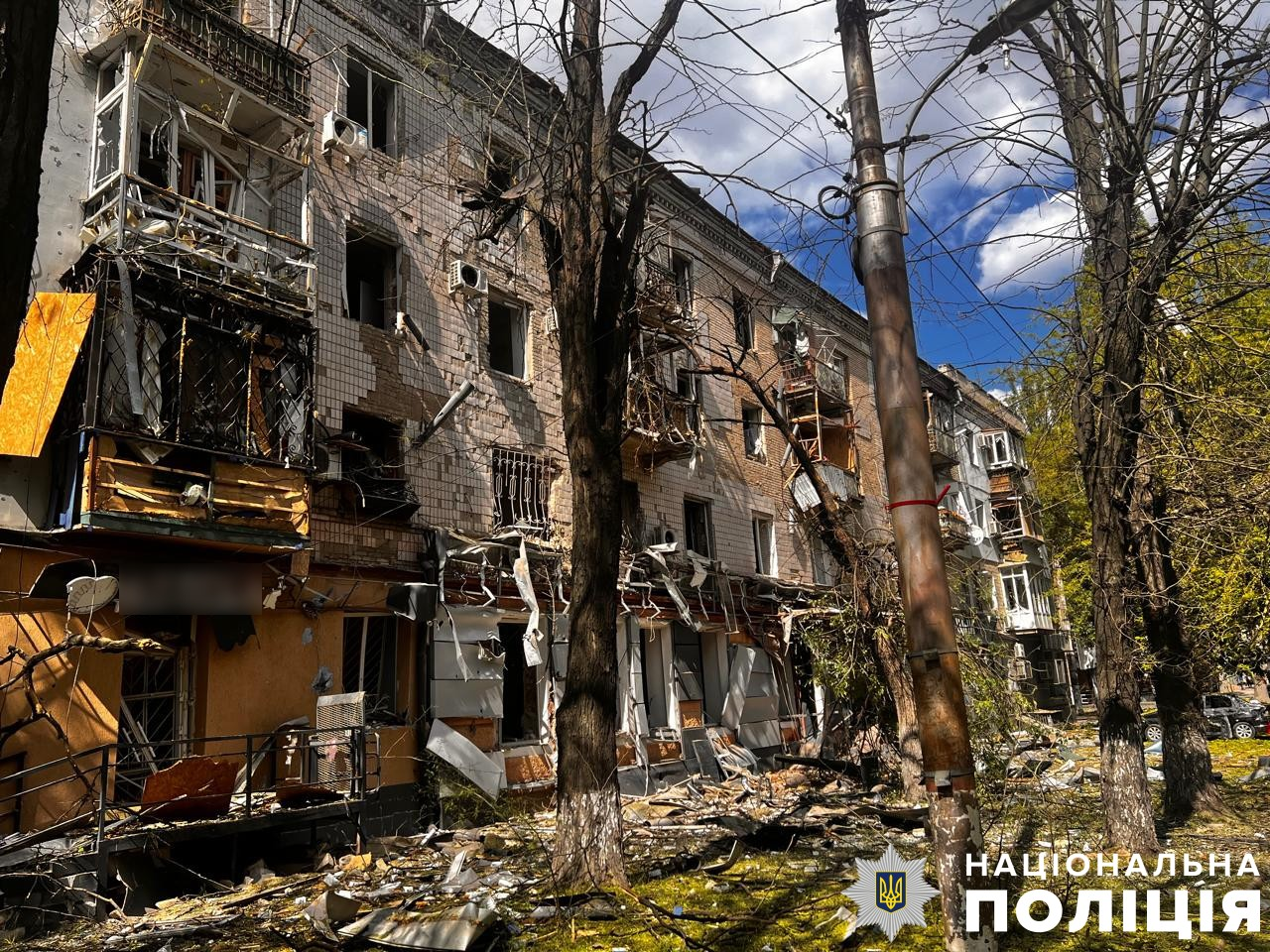
Damage in the center of Kherson after bomb strikes

Russian guided bomb and missile strikes on residential areas of Mykolaiv and Kherson injured at least 25 people, with three in serious condition. Local officials said apartment blocks, private residences, two schools, and a medical facility were damaged in the bombings. Another six were injured in a separate missile attack on a car service shop in Mykolaiv.

The SBU arrested six people in Donetsk Oblast on suspicion of aiding Russian airstrikes.

US Secretary of State Antony Blinken announced an additional $2 billion in aid, in addition to more ammunition, armoured vehicles, missiles, and air defences for Ukraine.

=== 16 May ===
Two people were killed in Russian attacks in Kharkiv Oblast. One person was killed in a separate attack in Kherson Oblast.

Ukrainian media reported that the HUR launched a drone attack on a weapons manufacturing plant in Russia's Tula Oblast.

President Zelenskyy arrived in Kharkiv to meet with the military leadership, saying that the situation in Kharkiv Oblast was "generally under control" but the area remained "extremely difficult".

A police official in Kharkiv said that up to 40 civilians in Vovchansk who attempted to flee shelling were captured by Russian forces and were reportedly imprisoned in basements where they are interrogated by alleged FSB agents. According to Ukrainian Interior Minister Ihor Klymenko, Russian soldiers in Vovchansk executed a civilian prisoner after he refused to obey orders and attempted to flee. Police opened a criminal investigation on the grounds of violations of laws of war.

Ukrainian soldiers in the Kharkiv front reported that they had "never seen anything close to the number of Lancets (drones) flying" compared to earlier battles. The ISW assessed that the "tempo of Russian offensive operations in the area continues to decrease".

=== 17 May ===
Russia claimed to have destroyed more than 100 air and naval drones over its western regions and in the Black Sea. Explosions were reported at petroleum facilities in Novorossiysk, while two people were reported killed in a drone strike in Belgorod Oblast. The Russian-installed Governor of Sevastopol, Mikhail Razvozhayev, said that the attack caused power outages in the city.

Four people were killed and 31 were wounded in a Russian airstrike in Kharkiv.

Two people were killed in a separate attack in Vovchansk, while one person was killed in Lyptsi. Police accused Russian soldiers in the town of using up to 40 civilian prisoners as human shields. The regional prosecutor's office also began a criminal proceeding on Russian soldiers allegedly executing a person in a wheelchair.

Zelenskyy signed a bill into law permitting individuals convicted of minor offenses to serve in the Ukrainian military, as well as another bill that increases fines for draft dodgers fivefold.

Zelenskyy reported the situation in Kharkiv had been "controlled" but not "stabilized". He also reported Ukraine has "about 25 percent" of the air defences needed to counter future Russian attacks, needing 120 to 130 F-16s or other advanced aircraft to achieve air "parity" with Russia.

=== 18 May ===
Russia claimed to have taken the village of Starytsia in Kharkiv Oblast.

Two people were killed in Russian attacks in Kherson Oblast.

Lieutenant-colonel Denys Vasyliuk, chief of staff of the Ukrainian Air Force's 831st Tactical Aviation Brigade, was reported killed in action.

Truckers partially blocked a section of the Kyiv-Odesa highway near Savran in protest over the revised mobilization law.

A Russian court seized over 700 million euros ($700 million) worth of assets from UniCredit, Deutsche Bank and Commerzbank to counter western sanctions.

Polish Prime Minister Donald Tusk announced a 10 billion zlotys ($2.55 billion) budget to secure Poland's borders with Russia, Belarus, and Ukraine. Tusk also announced he would speak with the European Investment Bank about financing 500 million zlotys ($127.7 million) for the European Sky Shield Initiative.

=== 19 May ===
Five people were killed in a double-tap airstrike, a common Russian tactic believed to deliberately target first responders, in the Mala Danylivka suburb of Kharkiv. Five others were killed in airstrikes in Kupiansk Raion, while one person was killed by shelling in Vovchansk.

Russian-installed officials in Kherson Oblast claimed that one person was killed in a Ukrainian drone strike on a minibus in Radensk, while one person was injured in a separate attack in Donetsk.

Ukrainian forces claimed to have sunk the Russian minesweeper Kovrovets and the missile ship Tsiklon, while Russian forces claimed to have shot down nine ATACMS and a drone over Crimea.

The SBU claimed that drones struck the Slavyansk oil refinery and the Kushchyovskaya airbase in Russia's Krasnodar Krai. Explosions occurred at both sites, with Ukraine claiming that aircraft were hit at the airbase. The refinery was temporarily closed to assess the damage.

=== 20 May ===
Russia claimed to have taken the village of Bilohorivka, Luhansk Oblast.

Two people were killed in Russian attacks in Kherson and Zaporizhzhia Oblast.

Ukrainian missiles hit a Russian military facility near Katerynivka, Luhansk Oblast, causing "powerful" explosions and a fire. The Ukrainians claimed to have killed 13 Russian servicemen in the strike, while 26 others were wounded. One of the wounded was allegedly Colonel General Gennadiy Anashkin, commander of Russia's Southern Military District.

Deputy Governor of Kharkiv Oblast Roman Semenukha claimed that Ukraine still controls 60% of Vovchansk.

A Russian court sentenced 24-year-old Ilya Baburin to 25 years in prison for treason and plotting an arson attack against a recruitment center in Siberia on behalf of Ukraine and setting fire to a local music school.

=== 21 May ===
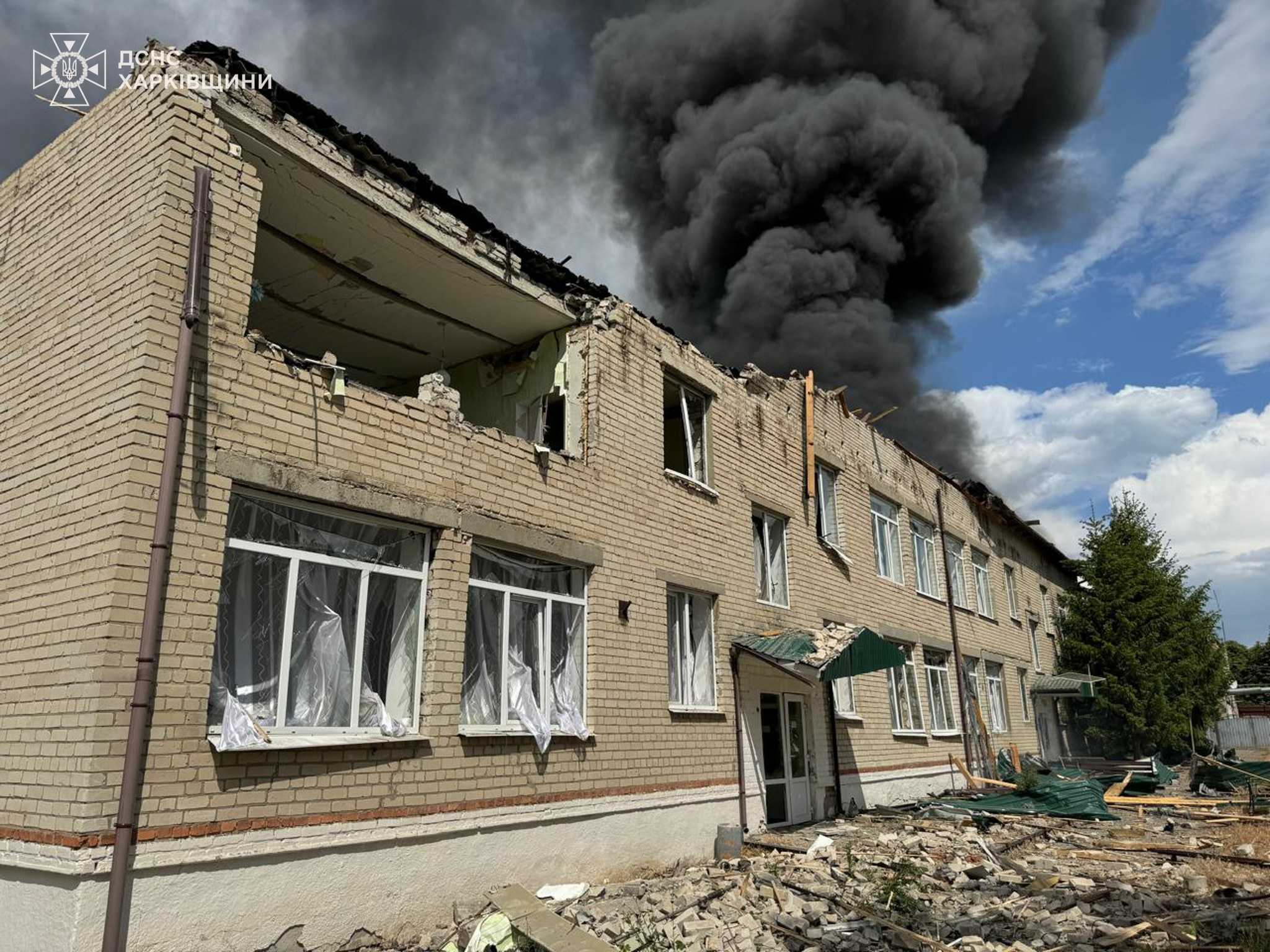
Kindergarten in Zolochiv (Kharkiv Oblast) after bombing on 21 May

Russian officials claimed that one person was killed in a Ukrainian drone strike in Belgorod Oblast.

Canada imposed new sanctions on Russian individuals and entities for facilitating the illegal transfer of North Korean weapons, including ballistic missiles, for use in the invasion of Ukraine.

The EU agreed to allow Ukraine to use the interest earned from seized Russian assets, totalling approximately 2.5 billion to 3 billion euros ($2.7 billion to $3.3 billion) annually, disbursed twice per year. Institutions will keep all interest earned between February 2022 and February 2024, possibly for reconstruction purposes, according to European Commission sources.

More than 3,000 Ukrainian prisoners have applied to join the Ukrainian military.

=== 22 May ===
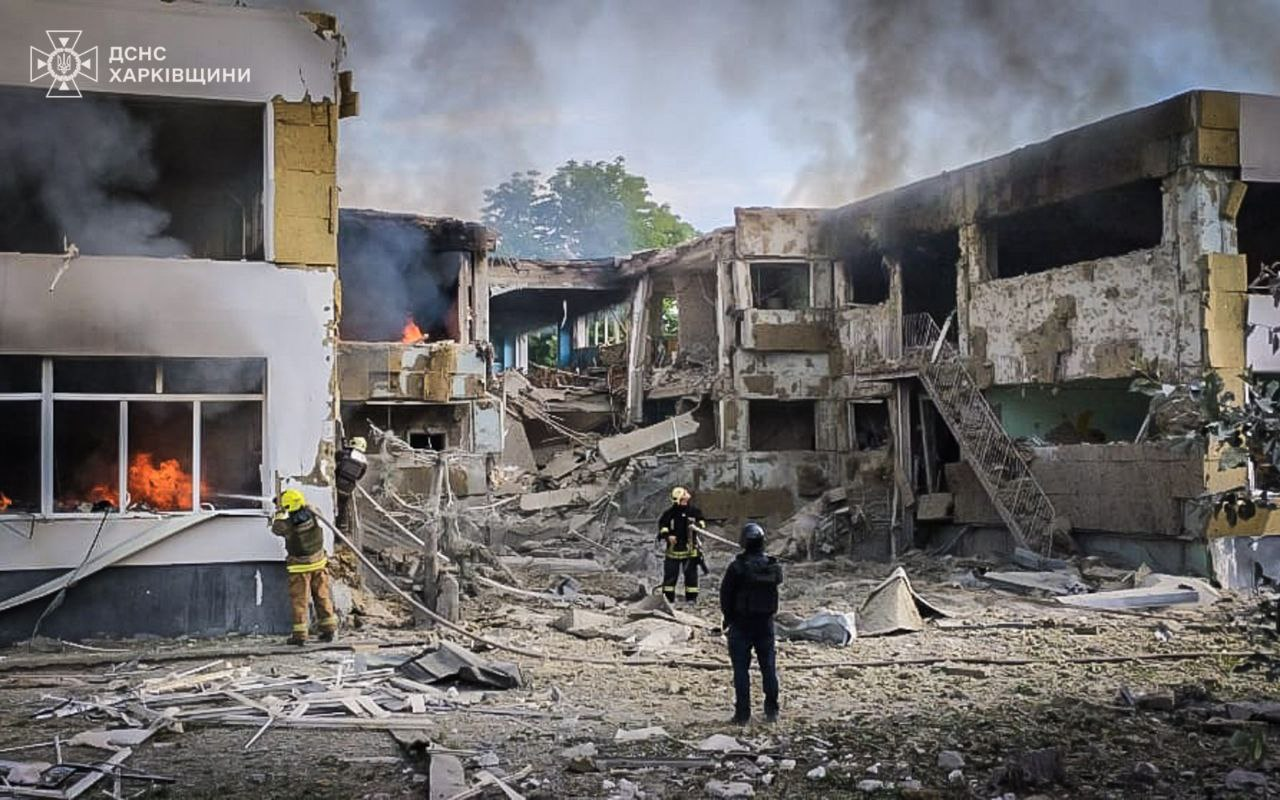
Kindergarten in Chuhuiv (Kharkiv Oblast) after missile attack on 22 May

Russia claimed to have taken the village of Klishchiivka in Donetsk Oblast for the second time since the start of the invasion in 2022.

Russian drone strikes on power facilities in Sumy cut power to over half a million consumers in Sumy, Chernihiv, and Kharkiv Oblasts.

Ukraine claimed to have shot down a Russian Su-25 jet near Pokrovsk.

A police officer was killed in a Russian drone strike near Vovchansk.

A Russian court sentenced a resident of Chita to 12 years' imprisonment for spying for Ukraine.

The United Kingdom accused China of supplying lethal aid to Russia.

The SBU announced it had upgraded its Sea Baby USV to launch Grad rockets.

=== 23 May ===
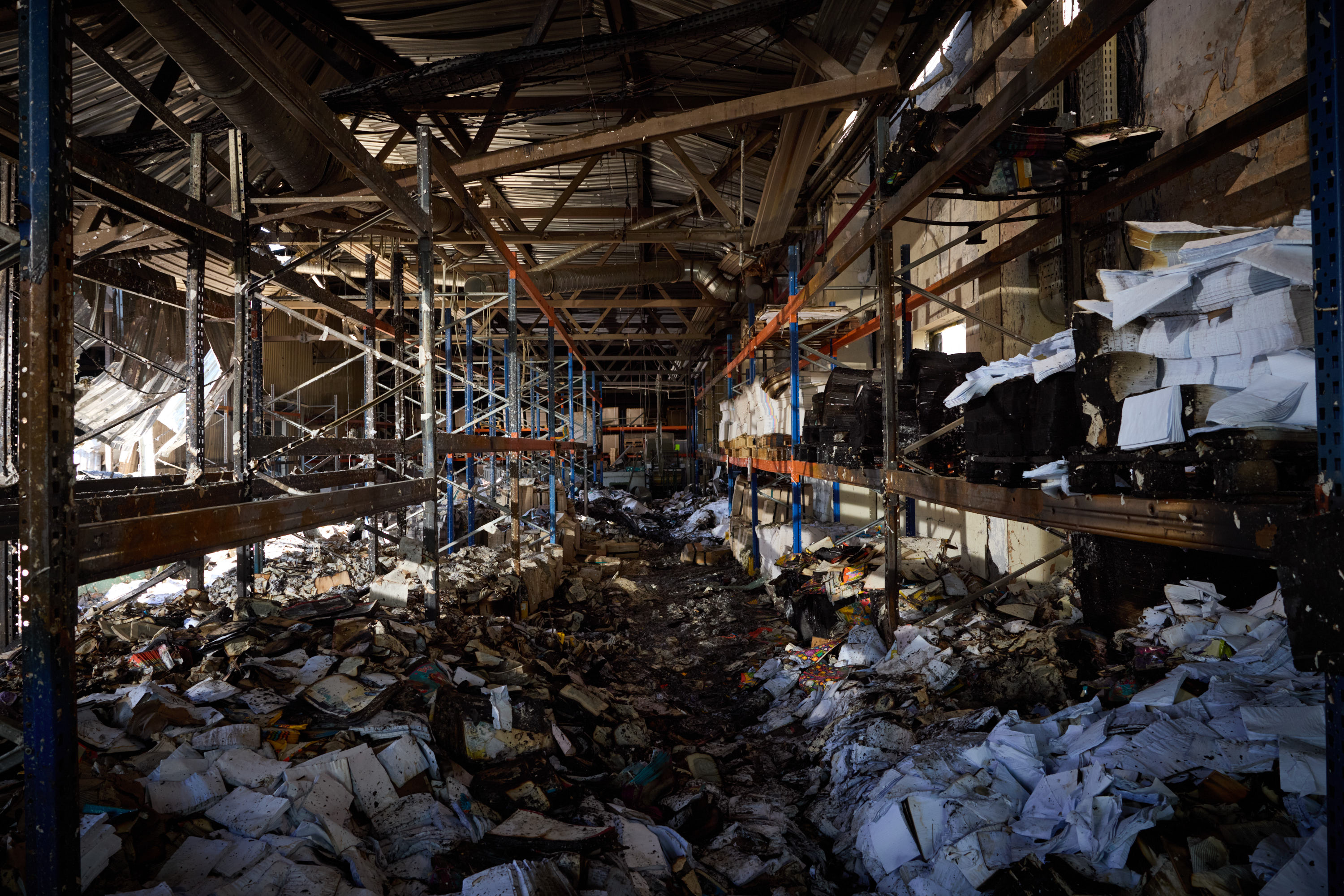
Printing house in Kharkiv after missile attack on 23 May

Seven people were killed in a Russian attack on the offices of Ukraine's largest printing house, located in Kharkiv. One person was killed in a separate attack in Zaporizhzhia Oblast.

Russian-installed authorities in Crimea claimed that two people were killed in a Ukrainian missile attack in Simferopol Raion. The pro-Ukrainian partisan group Atesh claimed that the attack targeted a communications hub in Alushta, while other attacks were reported on a military antenna in Semydviria, Belbek airfield and in Yevpatoria.

Ukraine claimed to have shot down a Russian Su-25 jet over the Donbas. Several sources questioned this claim, stating that the footage of the incident appeared to have been taken from a video game.

Russia claimed to have shot down a drone over Tatarstan. Officials claimed that one person was killed in a drone strike in Belgorod Oblast.

Norway pledged a $190 million military aid package to Ukraine that included support for air defense, naval capabilities, radar, anti-drone systems, and boats.

Russia warned the UK that it could strike British targets "on Ukraine's territory and beyond its borders" if weapons it supplied to Ukraine are used against targets on Russian soil.

The first group of Ukrainian pilots passed the US F-16 training program at Morris Air National Guard Base in Arizona and will undergo further training in Europe.

Putin signed a decree allowing the assets of the United States, its citizens, and its companies to be confiscated and used for compensation for losses incurred by international sanctions.

A court in Moscow sentenced a 36-year-old Russian man to 25 years in prison for joining a pro-Ukrainian unit, the Freedom of Russia Legion, and sabotaging railway equipment.

=== 24 May ===
Ukrainian authorities ordered the mandatory evacuation of 123 children from 36 settlements in Kharkiv Oblast due to Russian attacks.

The United States sent another military aid package for Ukraine, valued at $275 million. It included HIMARS, munitions, 155 mm and 105 mm high-demand artillery rounds, Javelin and AT4 antitank systems, antitank mines, tactical vehicles, small arms and ammunition.

The Ukrainian Air Force announced that it had begun using air dropped Small Diameter Bombs, which had "proved resilient to jamming" and had a "nearly 90 percent" accuracy rate, since November 2023.

=== 25 May ===
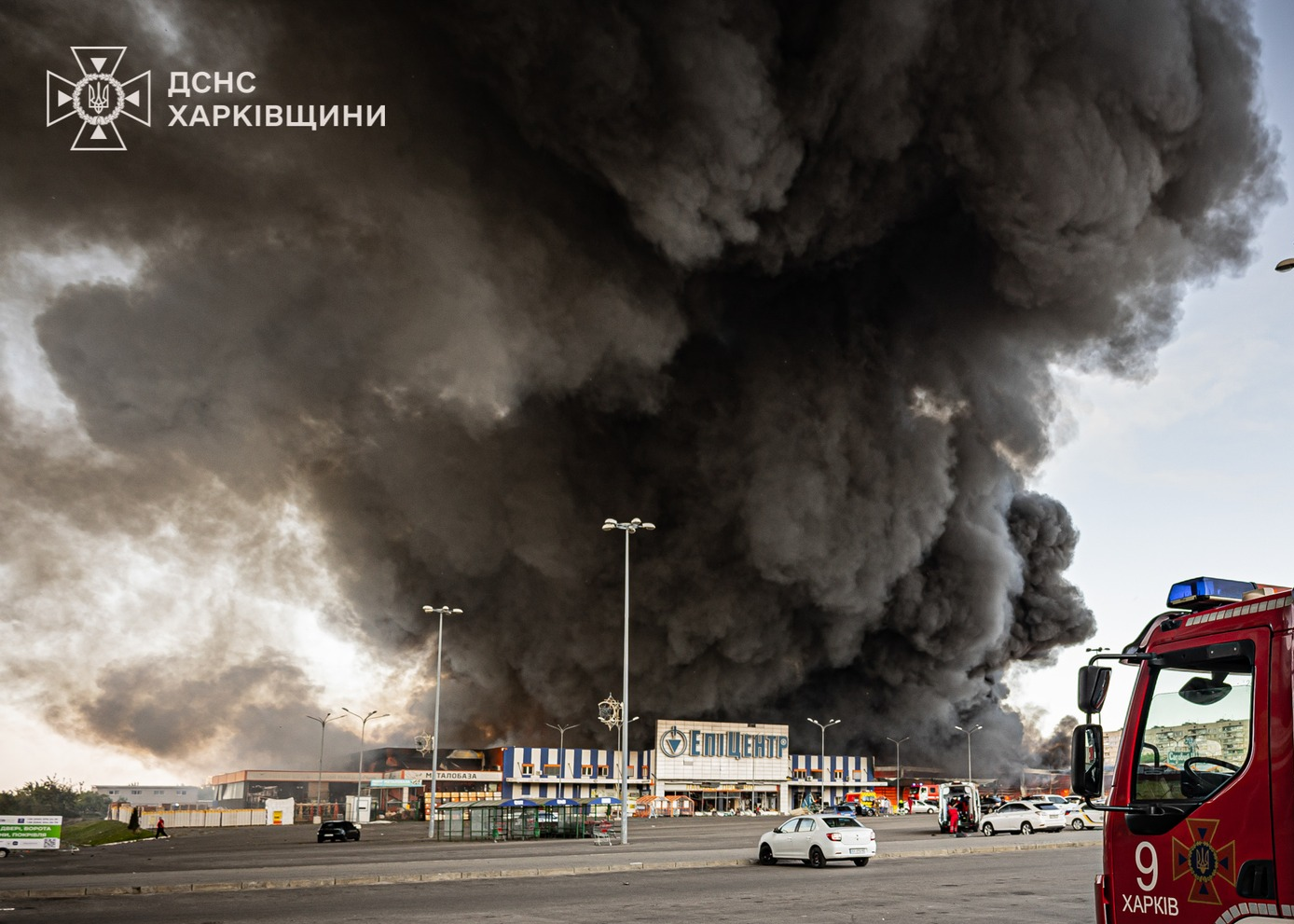
Hypermarket in Kharkiv after the attack

At least 19 people were killed and 54 others were injured in a Russian airstrike on a hypermarket and other locations in Kharkiv.

Russia claimed to have taken the village of Arkhanhelske, north of Donetsk and near Ocheretyne.

Ukrainian forces claimed to have shot down a Russian Su-25 jet over Donetsk Oblast using anti-aircraft guns.

Russian officials claimed that four people were injured in Ukrainian air attacks in Belgorod Oblast. According to the regional governor, Vyacheslav Gladkov, four people, including a child, were killed in the villages of Dubovoye and Oktyabrsky by Ukrainian shelling and rockets. Several homes were damaged by shelling in Shebekino. Russian air defences also intercepted 29 drones over the oblast, plus another in Kursk Oblast.

=== 26 May ===
One person was killed in a Russian attack in Kharkiv Oblast. Three people were killed in separate attacks in Donetsk Oblast.

A terminal of Zaporizhzhia International Airport was destroyed in a Russian missile attack.

Ukrainian media reported that an HUR drone struck a Russian early-warning Voronezh M radar system in Orsk, Orenburg Oblast after travelling a distance of some 1,800 kilometres. Satellite images taken on 27 May appear to show burn marks, confirming the attack. The radar is part of the Russian nuclear early warning for air- and space-based threats such as ballistic missiles and bombers.

Swedish Defence Minister Pål Jonson said that Ukraine had the right to strike targets on Russian soil, provided that it "comply with the laws of war".

=== 27 May ===
Russia claimed to have taken the villages of Netailove, 15 kilometers northwest of Donetsk, and Ivanivka, 20 kilometers east of Kupiansk.

Three people were killed in a Russian missile attack on a car wash in Snihurivka, Mykolaiv Oblast. One person was killed in an airstrike in Kharkiv.

Russian-installed officials in Luhansk claimed that a Ukrainian missile attack caused explosions and a fire near the former Luhansk Higher Military Aviation School and an aircraft repair plant.

Russian officials claimed that a firefighter was killed and three other emergency responders were injured during a drone attack on a fuel station in Livny, Oryol Oblast. Twelve drones were intercepted, including six in Oryol Oblast, by Russian air defences. In the evening, a drone was claimed to have been shot over Balashikha, Moscow Oblast.

Spain pledged €1 billion ($1.1 billion) to Ukraine after signing a decade-long security pact between the two countries. The aid will include 19 Leopard 2A4 tanks, artillery and Patriot missiles.

=== 28 May ===
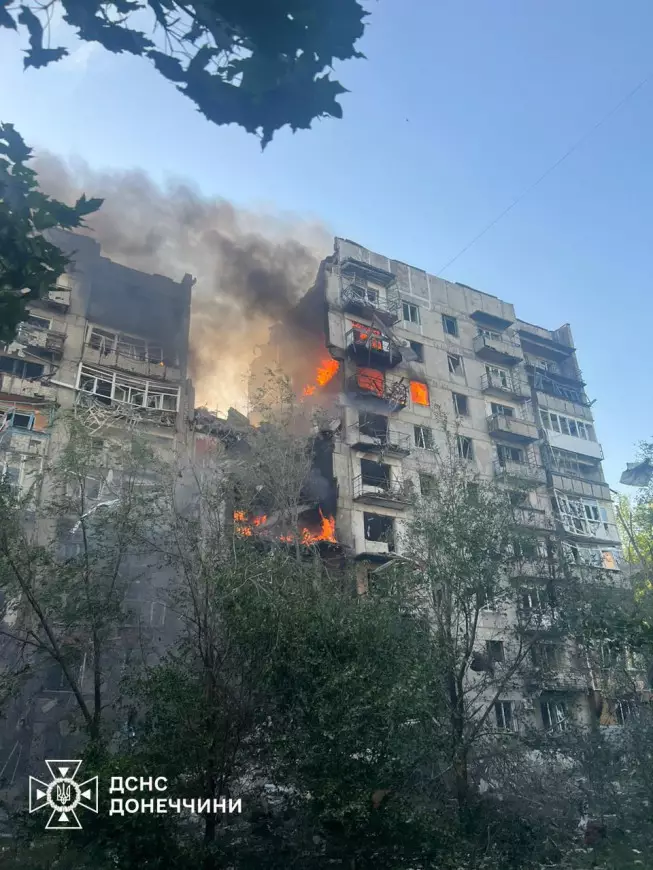
Residential building in Toretsk after the attack

Two people were killed in a Russian airstrike on Toretsk.

Belgium and Ukraine signed a security pact worth 977 million euros. It also included the delivery of 30 F-16s. The Dutch government announced that it was sending "part" of a Patriot battery in the hopes that allies could send "parts to assemble a complete system."

French President Emmanuel Macron allowed Ukraine to use SCALP EG missiles against targets on Russian soil, albeit limited to strikes against launch sites of missiles used against Ukraine.

=== 29 May ===
Two people were killed in a Russian rocket attack on Krasnopillia, Sumy Oblast. Two people were killed in separate attacks in Nikopol.

Explosions near Kerch and the Crimean Bridge were reported. Russian officials claimed that two ferries were damaged by falling missile debris.

Sweden pledged ASC 890 AWACS aircraft for Ukraine as part of an aid package valued at 13.3 Swedish krona ($1.3 billion), as well as its "entire stock" of Pansarbandvagn 302, which Sweden pulled from frontline service, artillery shells and anti-aircraft missiles.

US officials warned Ukraine against strikes on Voronezh radars, fearing such attacks hurt the "strategic stability" between the US and Russia.

=== 30 May ===
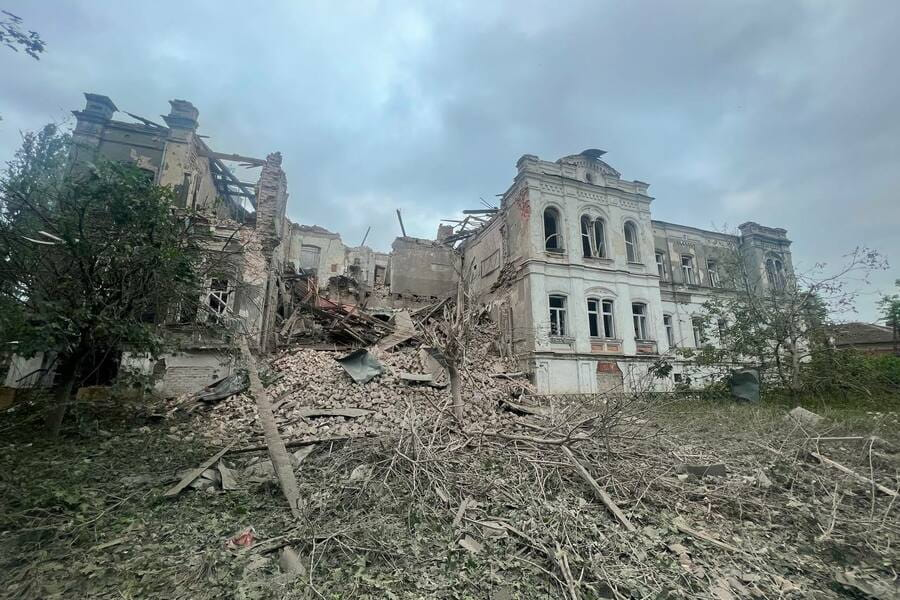
One of buildings of Kharkiv State Zooveterinary Academy after missile attack on 30 May

One person was killed in a Russian attack in Kherson Oblast.

Russian-installed officials in Luhansk Oblast claimed that a gas pipeline was damaged by a missile attack in Pervomaisk.

The HUR claimed that it had destroyed two Russian KS-701 Tunets patrol boats and damaged two other vessels in Vuzka Bay in Chornomorske, Crimea, using naval drones. SBU drones destroyed a Russian Nebo-SVU radar system in Armiansk, Crimea.

President Biden gave Ukraine permission to use weapons provided by the U.S. to attack Russian units in Russian soil in the vicinity of Kharkiv.

Germany announced another military aid package for Ukraine worth €500 million ($540 million) that would include artillery, air defence and drones.

=== 31 May ===
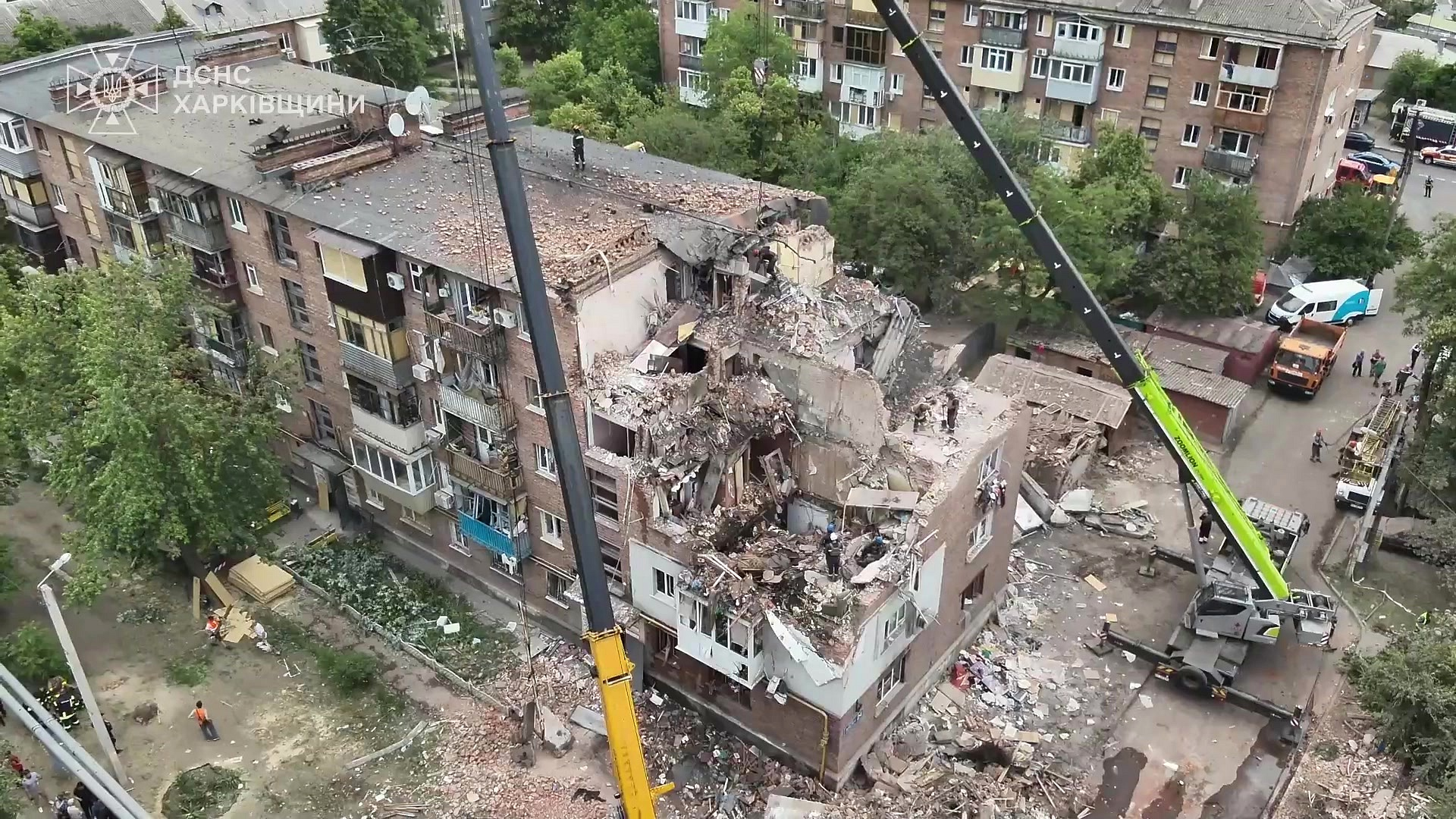
Residential building in Kharkiv after the attack

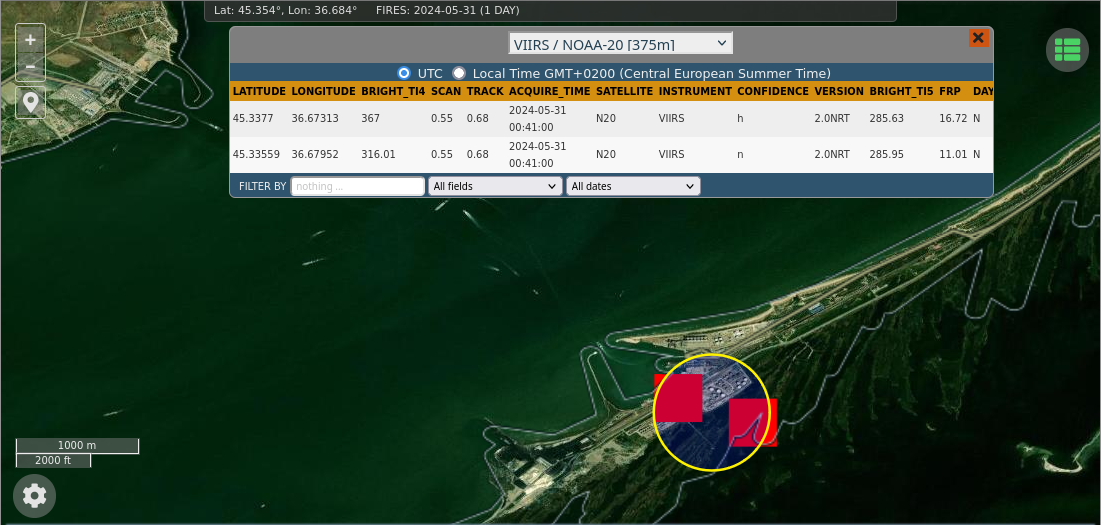
NASA's FIRMS detected fire on 31 May 2024 00:41 (UTC) in Port Kavkaz, Krasnodar Krai

Nine people were killed in Russian missile attacks in Kharkiv. One person was killed in a separate attack in Donetsk Oblast.

Russian-installed officials in Donetsk Oblast claimed that five people were killed in separate incidents of Ukrainian shelling.

Ukraine launched Neptune missiles and drones at a ferry crossing and an oil depot in Port Kavkaz, Krasnodar Krai. Various sources reported three petroleum tanks were damaged and a fire broke out. Additional facilities at the Kavkaz port were damaged, including a train. A power substation connected to the Crimean Bridge was also damaged. Russian authorities claimed that two people were injured in the attack on the depot.

The UAE brokered a prisoner swap in which 75 Ukrainians POWs were swapped for 75 Russian POWs.

Following the US decision to allow it, German Chancellor Olaf Scholz also allowed Ukraine to use their weapons to attack targets in Russia.

US sources claimed that the US government had handed over the "sensitive plans" for over 1,000 weapons systems for Ukraine to be able to build these weapons domestically.

The Russian Justice Ministry designated the Put’ Domoi (Way Home) movement, a women's organisation composed of wives of Russians mobilised in Ukraine and advocating for their return on its list of "foreign agents", adding that the group was creating a "negative image" of Russia and its military and had called for illegal protests.

Ukraine's Defense Ministry claimed that May 2024 was the deadliest month for Russia so far in the war, with Russian troop losses allegedly amounting to 38,940 killed, wounded, missing, or captured. They also claimed a record number of 1,160 Russian artillery systems destroyed.

== June 2024 ==
=== 1 June ===
Ukrenergo said Russia launched a barrage of missiles and drones targeting energy facilities in Donetsk, Zaporizhzhia, Dnipropetrovsk, Kirovohrad and Ivano-Frankivsk Oblasts. The private energy company DTEK reported that two thermal power plants were "seriously damaged". The governor of Zaporizhzhia Oblast said that the Dnieper Hydroelectric Station was in a "critical state" following the attacks.

Russian officials claimed that over 10 HIMARS rockets were destroyed by air defence in Belgorod Oblast. Fragments of the rockets were recovered and photographed.

=== 2 June ===
Vovchansk (Kharkiv Oblast) after Russian shelling and bombing

Russia claimed to have taken the village of Umanske, 30 kilometers northwest of Donetsk.

Russian officials claimed that nine people were injured in Ukrainian drone attacks and shelling in Belgorod and Kursk Oblasts.

=== 3 June ===
One person was killed in a Russian missile attack in Kharkiv Oblast. Two people, including a 12-year-old child, were killed in a Russian airstrike in Donetsk Oblast.

A S-300/400 was destroyed by HIMARS missiles in Belgorod. No casualties were reported. Russian authorities claimed that 20 drones were shot down in Kursk Oblast.

Italy announced that it was sending a second SAMP/T system to Ukraine.

=== 4 June ===
One person was killed in a Russian attack in Kherson Oblast. Another was killed by shelling in Sumy Oblast.

The SBU arrested a man in Zaporizhzhia Oblast on suspicion of plotting an attack against a military enlistment office on behalf of Russia.

Russia "vehemently denied" any involvement in an event in which five coffins draped in French flags were placed under the Eiffel Tower in Paris with the inscription "French soldiers of Ukraine". French media claimed that it was a Kremlin attempt to weaken French support for Ukraine.

Ukraine announced plans to establish a "decentralised energy system" using "mini-power plants" to reduce vulnerability to Russian attacks after the country's generating capacity was found to have been reduced to below 20 gigawatts from its previous capacity of 55 gigawatts.

=== 5 June ===
One person was killed in a Russian attack in Donetsk Oblast.

=== 6 June ===
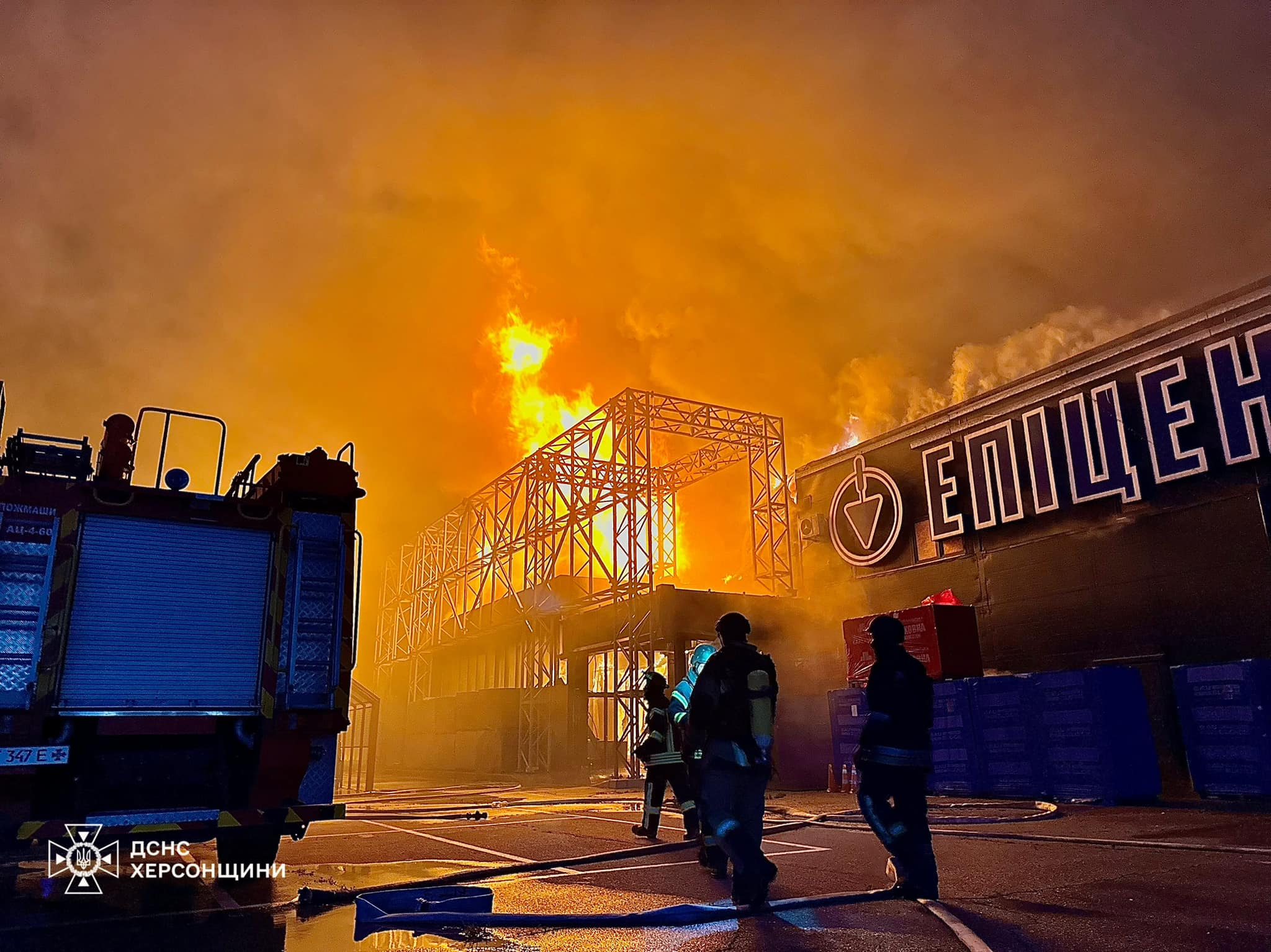
Epicentr store in Kherson after shelling on 6 June

One person was killed in a Russian attack in Chasiv Yar.

A Russian Black Sea Fleet tug boat of the Project 498 "Saturn"/"Proteus" class was sunk by HUR drones on Lake Panske, northwestern Crimea.

In Russia, several explosions and a fire occurred at the Novoshakhtinsk oil refinery, which the governor of Rostov Oblast claimed was caused by a drone attack.

A Ukrainian Su-25 belonging to the 299th Tactical Aviation Brigade was heavily damaged by a Russian Lancet drone at Krivoi Rog Air Base in Kryvyi Rih. No casualties were reported.

President Macron announced that France would send Ukraine an unspecified number of Mirage 2000-5 jet fighters and train Ukrainian pilots to fly them.

Japan donated 101 military vehicles to Ukraine, including PC-065B tracked engineering vehicles, Mitsubishi Type 73 Kogata off-road vehicles and Toyota HMVs.

=== 7 June ===
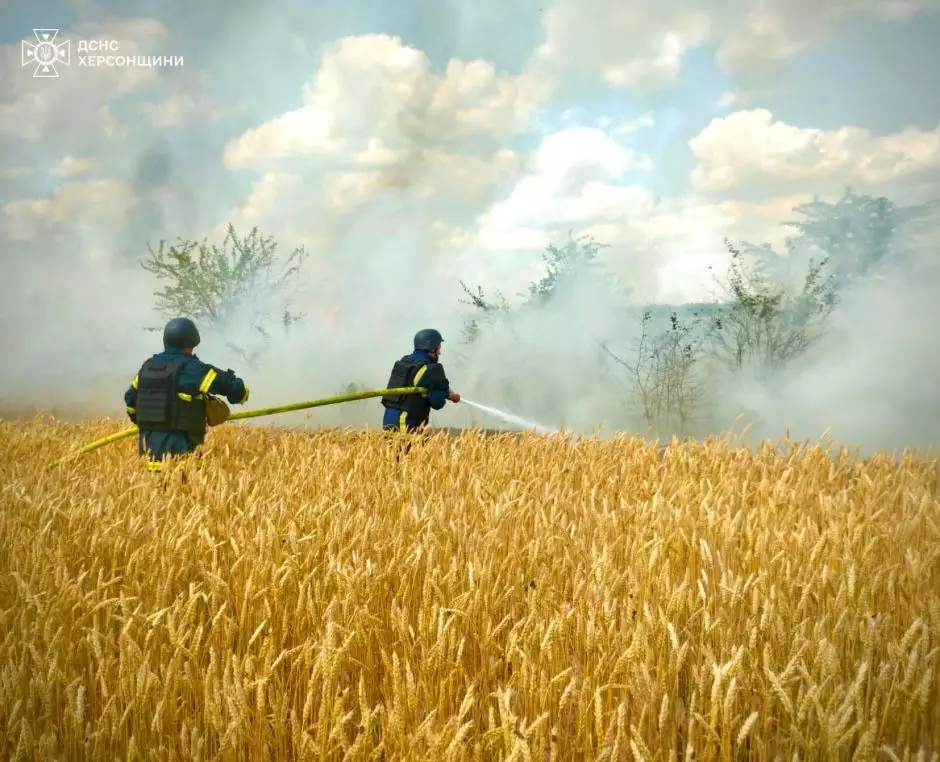
Wheat field in Kherson Oblast, burning due to shelling

Russian-installed officials in occupied Ukraine claimed that 22 people were killed and 15 others were injured by Ukrainian shelling in Sadove, Kherson Oblast, while four people were killed and 57 others were injured in a Ukrainian missile strike in Luhansk. One person was claimed killed in a drone strike in Belgorod Oblast.

One person was killed in a Russian missile attack near Poltava.

Russia claimed to have taken the village of Paraskoviivka, 25 kilometers southwest of Donetsk.

The Ukrainian military claimed to have "rendered unserviceable” a Ropucha-class landing ship that had been moved from the Black Sea to the Sea of Azov and was being used to ferry ammunition and other supplies to Russian forces in Mariupol.

The HUR claimed that Hennadii Matsehora, the former mayor of Kupiansk who was wanted for collaboration with Russia, was critically injured in an assassination attempt in Stary Oskol, Belgorod Oblast. He subsequently died from his injuries on 11 June.

Ukraine signed a contract for the supply of a second Ground Master 200 radar and command module from France that can be integrated with the SAMP/T system.

=== 8 June ===
Russia claimed to have shot down three Ukrainian drones targeting an air base near Mozdok, in the first such attack in North Ossetia-Alania since the war began.

One person was killed in a Russian attack in Kherson Oblast. Another was killed in an airstrike in Kharkiv Oblast.

The HUR claimed to have damaged two Russian Su-57 fighter jets for the first time using drones during a strike on the Akhtubinsk air base in Astrakhan Oblast. Drones also damaged the Russian tug boat Inzhener Smirnov and the barge Sectsia 179 in Taganrog Bay.

A Ukrainian warplane struck a target in Russia using an air delivered weapon for the first time during an attack on a "command node" in Belgorod Oblast.

The ISW assessed that Russia had resumed using the Crimean Bridge to transport fuel into Ukraine for the first time since it was suspended in March 2024 due to Ukrainian attacks.

=== 9 June ===
Ramzan Kadyrov, the head of Chechnya, claimed that the Akhmat-Chechnya regiment had taken the border village of Ryzhivka in Sumy Oblast. Ukrainian officials denied the claims. The ISW assessed that Russian forces had "likely recently seized" the village of Ivanivka in Kharkiv Oblast citing geolocated footage.

A Ukrainian missile struck a command post of the Russian 6th Combined Arms Army near Shebekino, Belgorod Oblast. Eight officers were reported missing.

Russia claimed to have shot down a Ukrainian drone over Belgorod Oblast.

The Ukrainian Air Force announced that it would start testing its own guided bombs due to a “limited” supply of Western guided weapons.

Bloomberg reported that Russia was forcing African migrants and students to sign contracts with the Russian Army or face deportation.

=== 10 June ===
Russia claimed to have taken the village of Staromaiorske, southwest of Donetsk. However, the Ukrainian military said that fighting for the village was still ongoing.

Explosions were reported overnight in Crimea by locals in Dzhankoi, Yevpatoria, Chornomorske, Rozdolne and Saky raions. Four missiles reportedly struck a target near Yevpatoria. The Ukrainian military later said it had targeted Russian S-400 and S-300 anti-aircraft missile systems in the attacks.

The Ukrainian military claimed to have shot down a Russian Su-25 fighter jet over the Pokrovsk sector in Donetsk Oblast.

Two people were killed by Russian airstrikes in Kharkiv Oblast. One person was killed in an attack in Poltava Oblast.

=== 11 June ===
Russia claimed to have taken the villages of Synkivka, 120 kilometers east of Kharkiv, and Myasozharivka in Luhansk Oblast. The claim over the capture of Synkivka was not supported by war analysts like DeepStateMap.Live, which continued to depict Russian attack vectors to the north and east of the village, but no capture.

A Ukrainian Switchblade, believed to be a 600 or improved model, struck a Russian Buk missile launcher in Sarabash, Donetsk Oblast.

Ukraine formally established the Unmanned Systems Forces, a branch of the Ukrainian military presiding over the force's drone operations.

The US State Department lifted its ban on providing weapons and training to the Azov Regiment after clearing them on charges of human rights abuses in a review.

The New York Times reported that the Russian army was recruiting female prisoners to serve in Ukraine.

During a press conference in Germany with President Zelenskyy, German Defence Minister Boris Pistorius announced that Germany and its allies had collected some 100 Patriot missiles for delivery. Pistorius further announced that Germany would also donate a third Patriot battery, IRIS-T missiles and more Gepard anti-aircraft guns in a package worth some five hundred million euros.

=== 12 June ===
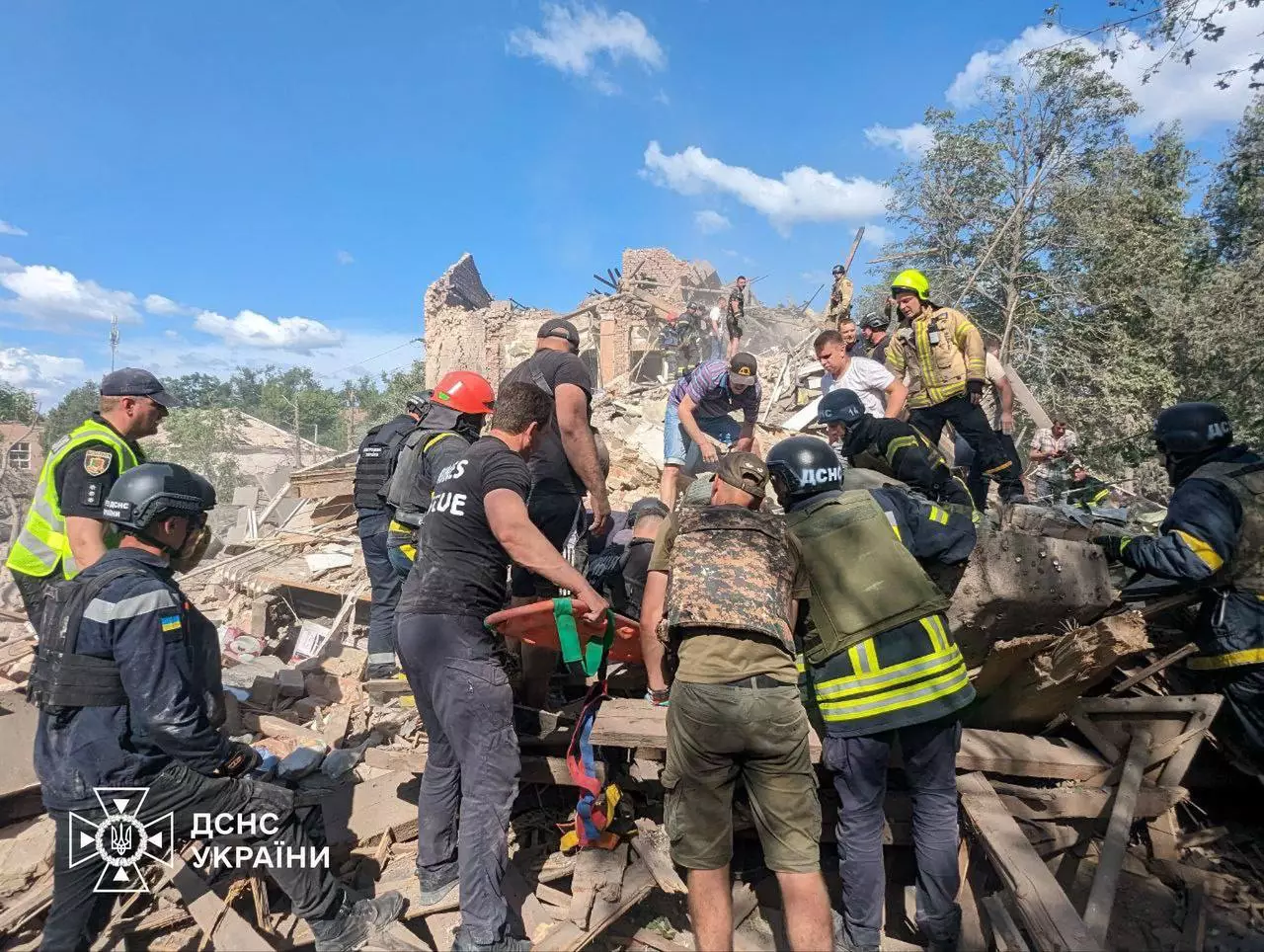
Destructions in Kryvyi Rih after the strike

Russia attacked Kyiv with missiles and drones. Later in the day, at least nine people were killed and 29 others injured in a missile strike in Kryvyi Rih.

Explosions were reported in Crimea and Krasnodar Krai according to local media. A Russian S-300 near Belbek airfield and two S-400s near Belbek and Sevastopol were destroyed according to Ukrainian officials.

The US pledged another Patriot battery to Ukraine.

Russia deployed S-500 batteries to Crimea, according to the HUR.

A Ukrainian soldier claimed to have shot down a cruise missile using a machine gun, during a Russian air attack on Kyiv.

=== 13 June ===
The Ukrainian military claimed that its Third Special Operations Forces Regiment had destroyed a Russian R-416GM digital radio relay communication station, a truck-based system designed to improve the efficiency of radio relay units in the field, for the first time.

Russia claimed to have shot down three drones over Yaroslavl Oblast and another over Vladimir Oblast. In Belgorod, the Governor claimed a drone damaged a car and injured two people.

A Ukrainian court convicted a former executive of the Zaporizhzhia Nuclear Power Plant of collaborating with Russia and sentenced him to ten years' imprisonment.

The G7 agreed to provide a $50 billion-loan derived from frozen Russian assets for military use by Ukraine during a summit in Italy that also saw the US and Ukraine sign a 10-year bilateral security deal.

Canada pledged 2,000 decommissioned CRV7 “rocket motors”, armoured vehicles to be assembled in Kyiv, 29 Nanuk Remotely Controlled Weapon Stations and 130,000 rounds of ammunition to Ukraine.

=== 14 June ===
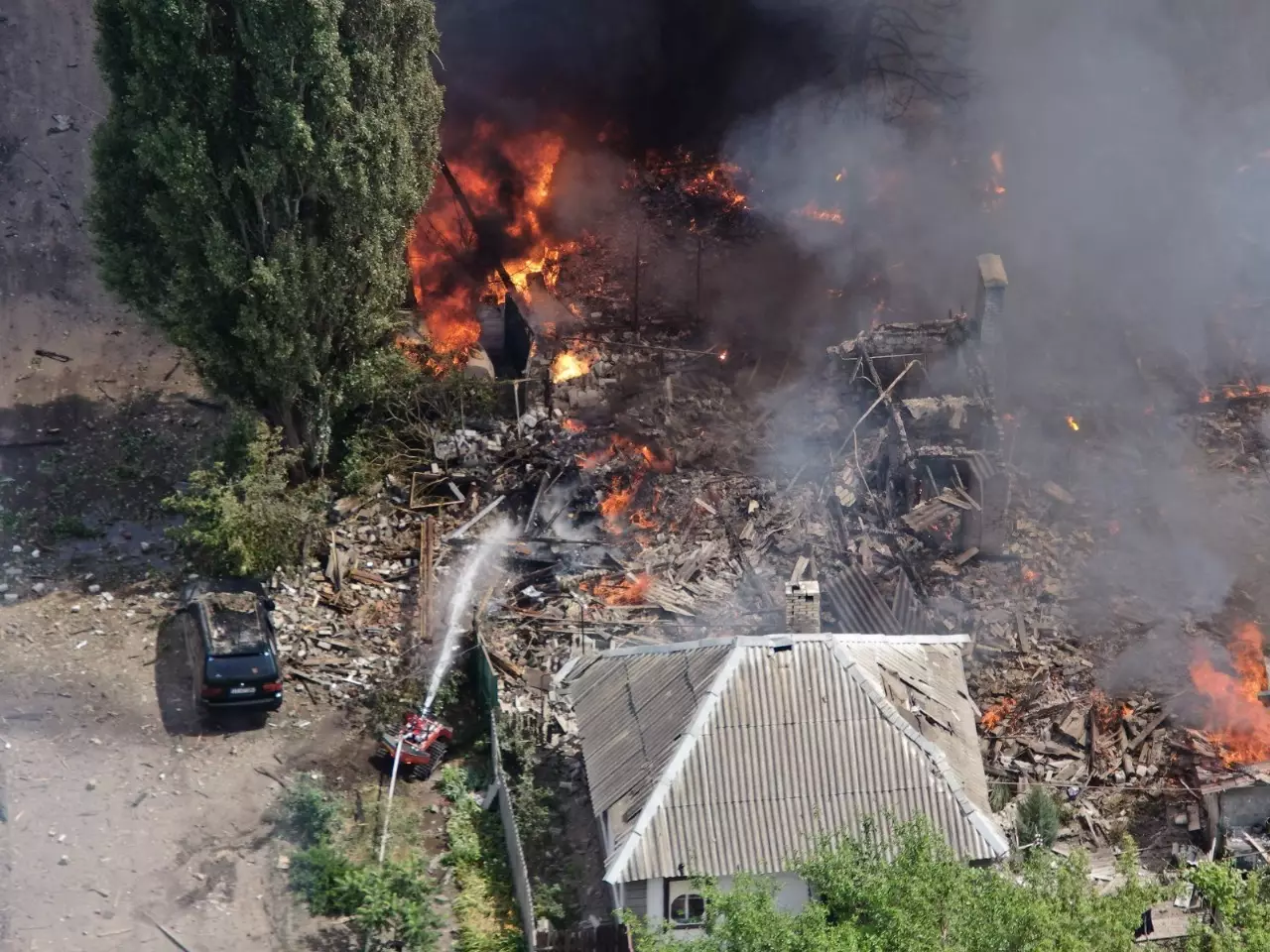
Houses in Druzhkivka after shelling on 14 June

One person was killed in a Russian missile attack in Sumy Oblast.

Russian officials claimed that drones struck energy facilities in Rostov and Voronezh Oblasts. HUR officials claimed that two Su-34s were damaged during a Ukrainian drone strike on the Morozovsk air base in Rostov Oblast, with unconfirmed reports of six pilots killed and 10 troops wounded.

Russian President Vladimir Putin claimed that almost 700,000 Russian soldiers were fighting in Ukraine, as on 14 June.

The Ukrainian 68th Jaeger Brigade claimed to have destroyed an entire Russian tank company, with eight tanks destroyed and two damaged, plus eight infantry fighting vehicles and two artillery pieces destroyed in the Pokrovsk sector. They also claimed that 242 Russian troops were killed or wounded during fighting in the Pokrovsk direction on 14 June.

Russia designated the Georgian National Legion, a foreign volunteer unit fighting for Ukraine, as a terrorist organisation.

South Korean Defense Minister Shin Won-sik claimed that North Korea could have sent 4.8 million rounds of artillery ammunition to Russia, for use in Ukraine, as well as "dozens" of ballistic missiles.

=== 15 June ===
Three people were killed in a Russian cluster munitions attack in Ulakly, Donetsk Oblast.

In Russia, the governor of Belgorod Oblast claimed that five people were killed by Ukrainian shelling in Shebekino.

The US government announced $1.5 billion in humanitarian aid for Ukraine, mostly for its energy sector.

The June 2024 Ukraine peace summit opened in Switzerland with 92 countries participating. Russia and China did not attend the meeting.

=== 16 June ===
The Ukrainian Azov Brigade claimed to have advanced by one kilometer and pushed out Russian forces in the Serebryansky forest in Luhansk Oblast.

=== 17 June ===
Ukraine launched a drone attack on western Russia, with the HUR claiming to have struck a metallurgical plant and military production facilities in Belgorod, Voronezh, and Lipetsk Oblasts.

The Russian Investigative Committee charged Ukrainian Colonel Mykola Dzyaman with terrorism in absentia and placed him on a wanted list for ordering the shooting down of a A-50U over the Sea of Azov on 23 February 2024.

=== 18 June ===
Ukrainian forces retook the village of Tykhe, west of Vovchansk.

In Russia, the governor of Rostov Oblast claimed that several oil storage tanks were set on fire by a drone strike in Azov that destroyed 5,000 cubic metres of petroleum products. An oil depot in Krasnodar Krai was struck by Neptune missiles according to local sources, damaging a pipeline, “technical facilities” and starting a fire. No casualties were reported.

A Ukrainian court sentenced a resident of Donetsk Oblast to 15 years' imprisonment for spying on Ukrainian positions on behalf of Russia during the Battle of Bakhmut.

Swiss authorities claimed to have foiled an assassination attempt aimed at the Ukrainian peace summit, saying that a Russian diplomat was arrested a “few weeks” prior after trying to buy firearms.

Ukrainian military observer Kostyantyn Mashovets claimed that the Russian Central Grouping of Forces has about 87,000 personnel, 365 tanks, 864 armored combat vehicles, of which about 68,000-70,000 personnel, 310-320 tanks, and about 576 armored fighting vehicles are currently deployed in the Pokrovsk direction.

=== 19 June ===
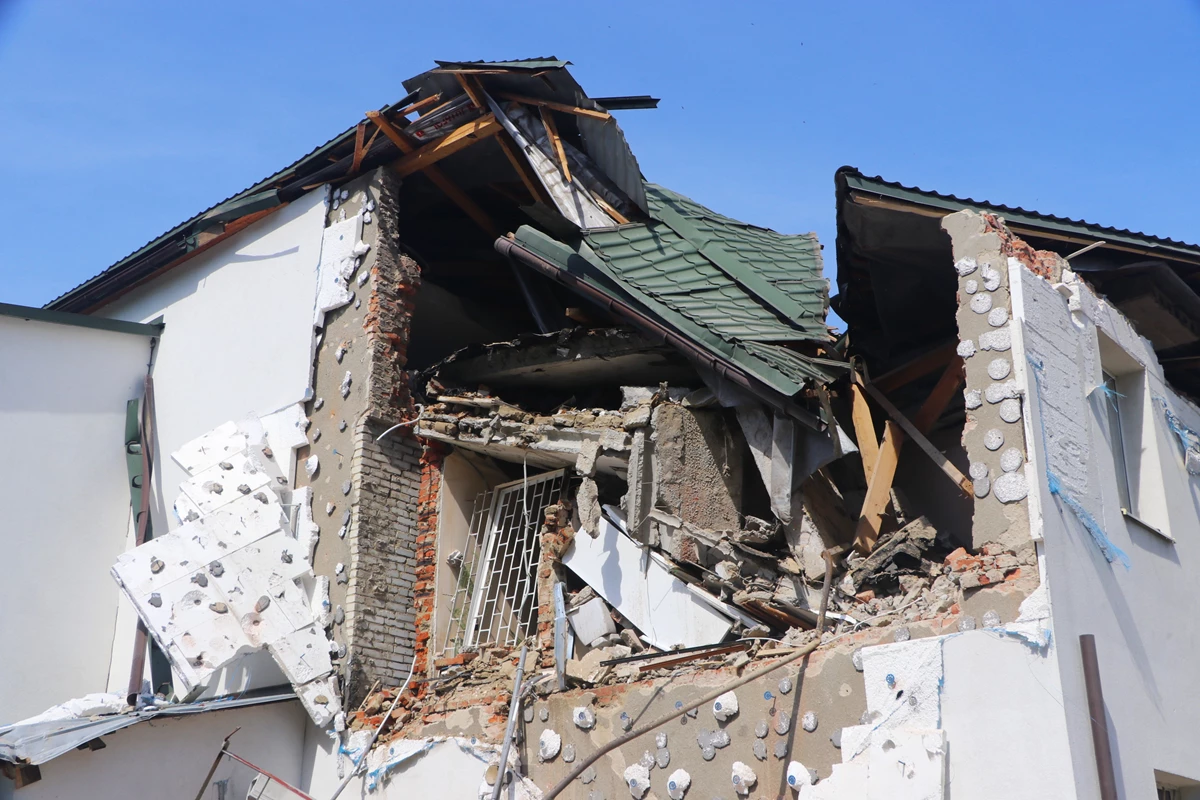
Building of Institute of veterinary medicinal products and feed additives in Lviv after Russian drone attack

One person was killed in a Russian attack in Kherson.

Ukraine established a national registry to document sexual violence by Russian forces in the country.

North Korean dictator Kim Jong Un pledged to “unconditionally support” Russia with its invasion of Ukraine during a visit by Putin to Pyongyang.

Russian opposition media claimed that, during 2024, Russian aircraft accidentally dropped 103 bombs on Russian soil and Russian occupied territories.

=== 20 June ===
Four people were killed in Russian attacks in Donetsk Oblast. One person was killed in a separate attack in Kherson Oblast.

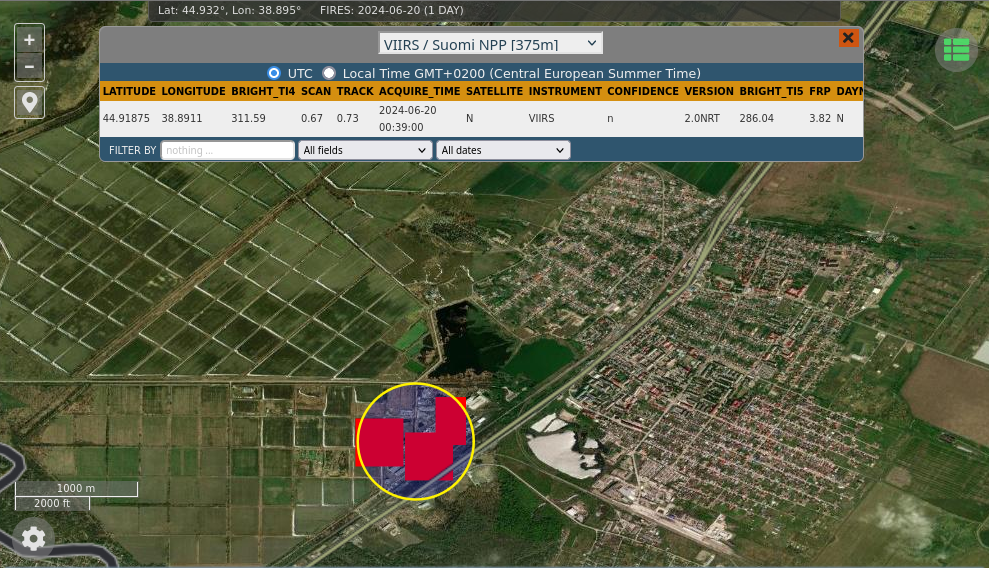
NASA's FIRMS detected the Enem oil depot fire on 20 June 00:39:00 (UTC)

Russian media reported an attack by Ukrainian drones on the Afipsky oil refinery in Krasnodar Krai, as well as in oil depots in Tambov Oblast and Enem, Adygea. Authorities also claimed that drones were shot down over Bryansk, Rostov, Belgorod and Oryol Oblasts. One person was killed in a drone strike in Slavyansk-on-Kuban.

Russia withdrew 80% of its soldiers from the Finnish border and redeployed them to Ukraine, according to an investigation by Finnish media.

The Romanian government pledged to deliver a Patriot battery to Ukraine in exchange for a replacement unit from the US.

John Kirby, National Security Council Coordinator for Strategic Communications, confirmed that the US government was to “reprioritise” all foreign exports of Patriot and NASAMS missiles in favour of Ukraine.

Russia claimed that it used for the first time, a FAB-3000 modified with a guidance wing kit near Lyptsi, Kharkiv Oblast.

=== 21 June ===
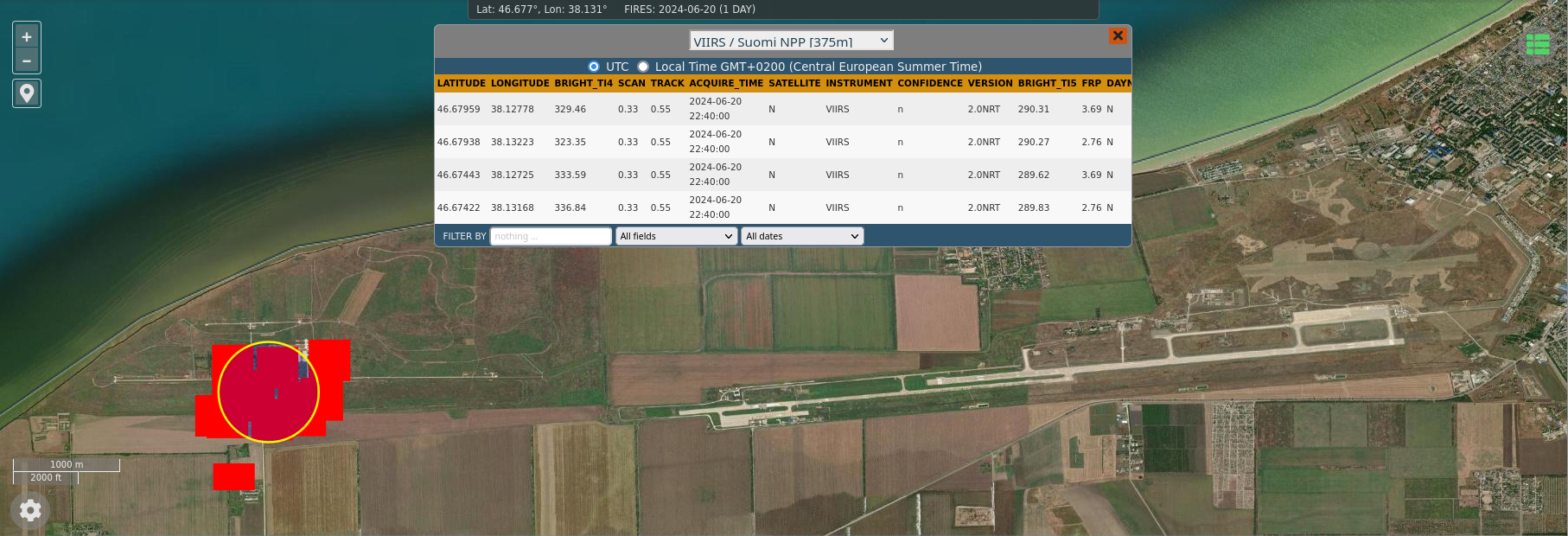
NASA's FIRMS detected fire next to Yeysk air base on 21 June

Russia claimed that Ukraine launched over 100 drones at Crimea, Krasnodar Krai, and Volgograd Oblast. Russia's Defense Ministry said that 43 drones were shot down over Krasnodar Krai, a further 70 over Crimea and one in Volgograd. Six naval drones were also destroyed in the Black Sea. Russian officials claimed one person in Krasnodar Krai was killed and six injured. Reports suggested that a "50-square-meter fire" broke out at the Ilya refinery in Krasnodar Krai. The Yeysk air base, also in Krasnodar Krai, was attacked causing fire detected by NASA's FIRMS and reportedly destroying personnel and facilities used for launching Shahed drones. A Ka-29 was reportedly shot down over Crimea by friendly fire during the attacks, killing its crew of four.

Two people were killed in a Russian airstrike in Donetsk Oblast. One person was killed in a drone strike in Vovchansk.

The SBU filed charges against two bloggers on suspicion of sharing sensitive information on Ukrainian military positions and units on social media.

=== 22 June ===
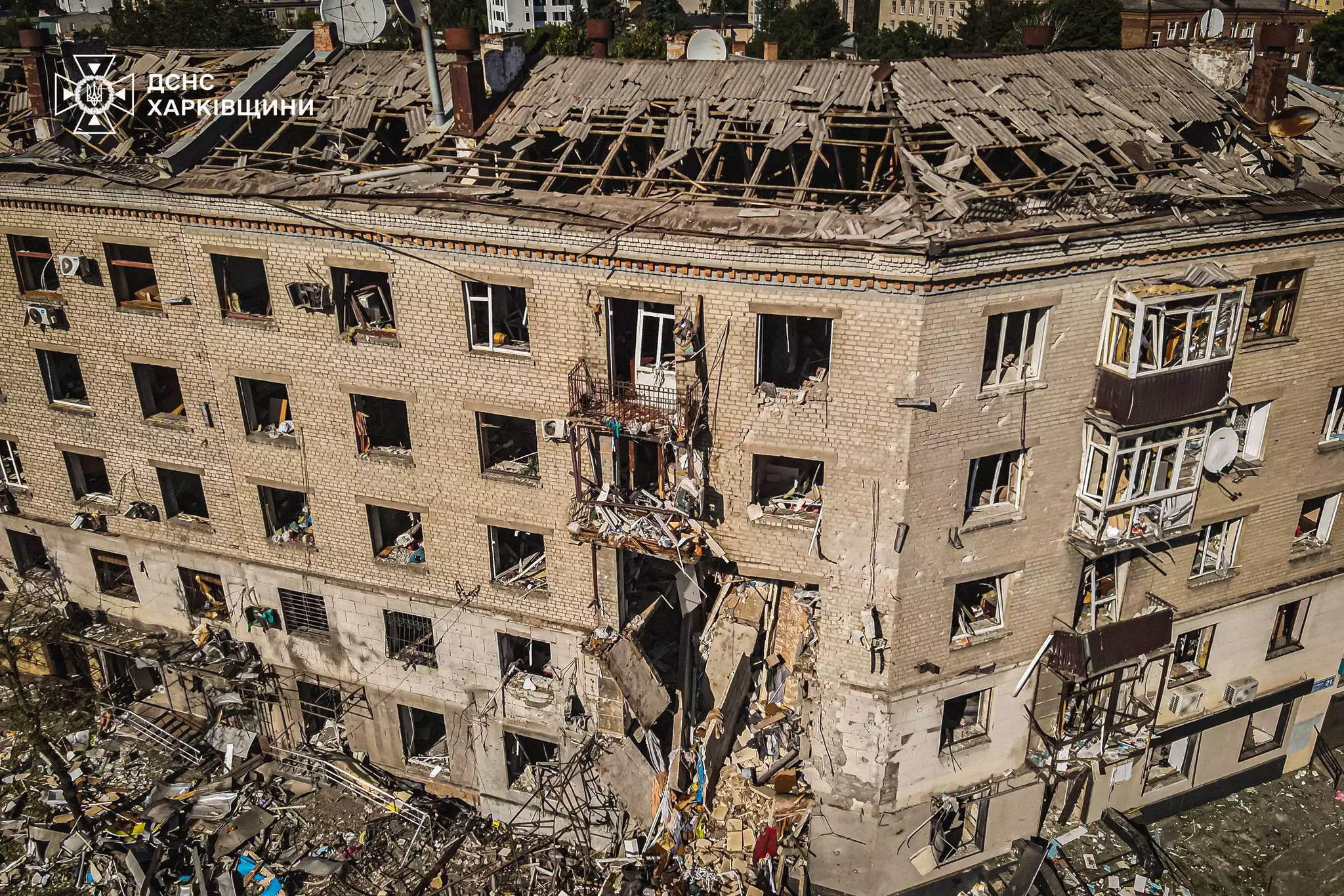
Residential building in Kharkiv after the airstrike

Russia launched 16 missiles and 13 drones at energy infrastructure across Ukraine. Two energy workers in Zaporizhzhia Oblast were wounded. In Lviv Oblast a missile hit an energy facility, starting a fire. In Ivano-Frankivsk one of the buildings of Ivano-Frankivsk National Technical University of Oil and Gas was semi-destroyed and a kindergarten was damaged. Explosions were reported in Volyn and Vinnytsia Oblasts. Twelve missiles and all drones were shot down, according to the Ukrainian Air Force.

Russian media reported that a Pantsir S-1 anti-aircraft missile system was struck in a Ukrainian air attack in Belgorod Oblast.

Three people were killed in Russian airstrikes in Kharkiv.

=== 23 June ===
Russian forces took the village of Novooleksandrivka In Donetsk Oblast.

Russia claimed that four people were killed and 151 wounded in a Ukrainian missile attack in Sevastopol. Satellite pictures showed damage to the Pluton complex located at Vityne, Crimea.

One person was killed in a Russian airstrike in Kharkiv.

The Ukrainian partisan unit Atesh sabotaged the Rostov-on-Don-Mariupol railway line by setting fire to a relay cabinet in Rostov-on-Don. The Ukrainian military claimed that it had struck the command post of a Russian motorized rifle regiment in Belgorod Oblast.

=== 24 June ===
Five people were killed and 41 others were injured in a Russian missile attack on Pokrovsk. Two others were killed in attacks in other parts of Donetsk Oblast.

Ukraine deployed M30 GMLRS rockets fitted with cluster warheads for the first time.

The IAEA reported that an external radiation monitoring station near the Zaporizhzhia Nuclear Power Plant was destroyed by shelling and fires.

In Russia, the governor of Belgorod Oblast claimed that four people were injured in a drone attack.

Zelenskyy ordered the dismissal of Lieutenant General Yurii Sodol as Commander of the Joint Forces of the Ukrainian Armed Forces and his replacement by Brigadier General Andrii Hnatov.

The SBU arrested a man on suspicion of spying on Ukrainian positions on the border with Belarus on behalf of Russia.

=== 25 June ===
The International Criminal Court issued arrest warrants against former Russian defence minister Sergei Shoigu and Chief of the General Staff Valery Gerasimov for war crimes and crimes against humanity pertaining to strikes on Ukrainian energy facilities from 2022 to 2023.

The HUR claimed to have blown up a Russian ammunition depot in Voronezh Oblast. The governor of Belgorod Oblast claimed that one person was killed in a drone strike.

Czech Prime Minister Petr Fiala said that the first batch of artillery ammunition purchased under the Czech-led initiative had been delivered to Ukraine.

Russia and Ukraine conducted a prisoner exchange involving 90 POWs from each side. One of the prisoners swapped was a Ukrainian Orthodox priest who had been convicted and sentenced for “justifying Russian armed aggression“.

=== 26 June ===
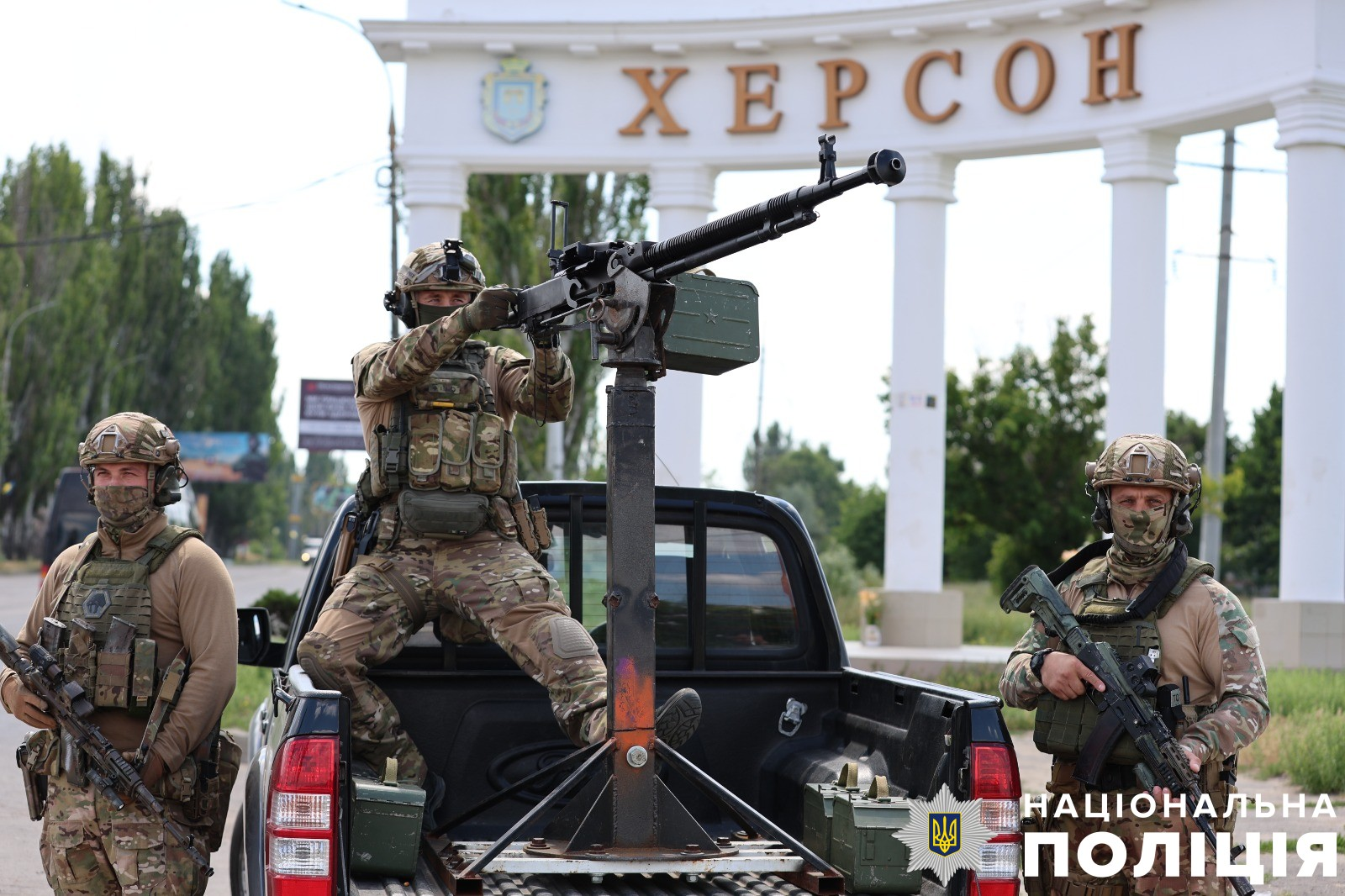
Mobile fire team of Ukrainian police, which hunts for Russian drones in Kherson region

Ukrainian media reported that the HUR carried out a cyberattack on Russian internet providers in Crimea.

The HUR revealed that a crowd-sourced satellite purchased in 2022 was responsible for taking some 4,200 images using Synthetic Aperture Radar, saying that this led to the destruction of over 1,500 Russian targets worth “billions” of dollars.

=== 27 June ===
In Donetsk Oblast, two people were killed by Russian shelling in Kurakhove, while one person was killed in a separate attack in Toretsk.

The Ukrainian military claimed to have driven out Russian forces from the Kanal neighborhood of Chasiv Yar.

Russian media reported that an explosion occurred at a chemical plant in Tver Oblast following a drone strike. The plant is believed to manufacture aviation fuel. According to local residents four drones struck the plant, damaging a workshop, pipeline and roof. No casualties were reported and Russian authorities claimed all four drones were destroyed.

=== 28 June ===
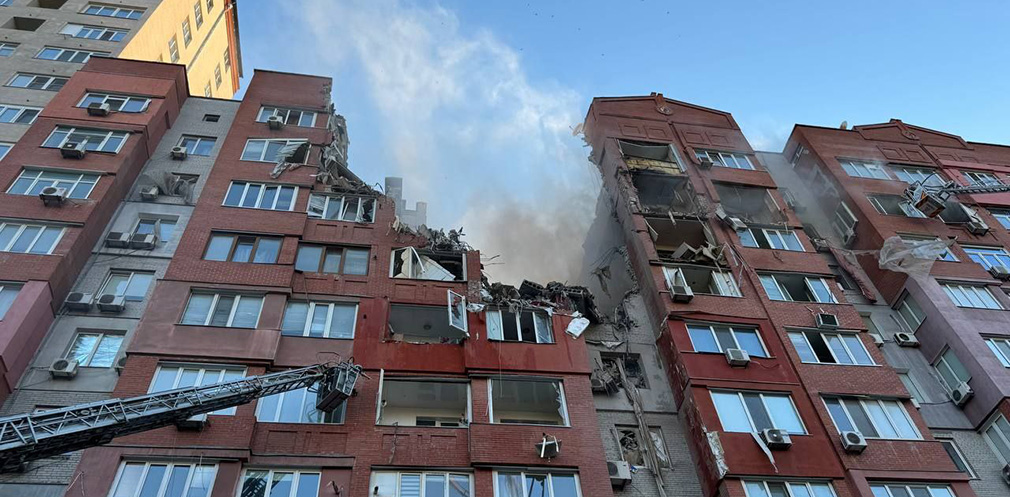
Residential building in Dnipro after the attack

Three people were killed in a Russian missile attack on Dnipro.

In Russia, the governor of Tambov Oblast claimed that an oil depot was set on fire by a drone strike. Seven Ukrainian drones struck the Novolipetsk Metallurgical Plant in Lipetsk, damaging its oxygen station and oxygen separation unit without causing casualties.

The National Guard of Ukraine claimed to have shot down a Russian Su-25 fighter jet over Donetsk Oblast using an Igla missile.

Ukrainian media reported an ATACMS missile destroyed either a S-400 or S-500 missile system, using cluster bombs, at an unknown location in Crimea.

Zelenskyy announced the release of ten Ukrainian civilians held by Russia, some of whom had been arrested in Belarus and Russian-occupied areas in Ukraine since 2017, following an agreement mediated by the Vatican.

A Russian milblogger released images of Russian soldiers using North Korean shells for M-46 howitzer, written on some of the shells was "for Sevastopol".

=== 29 June ===
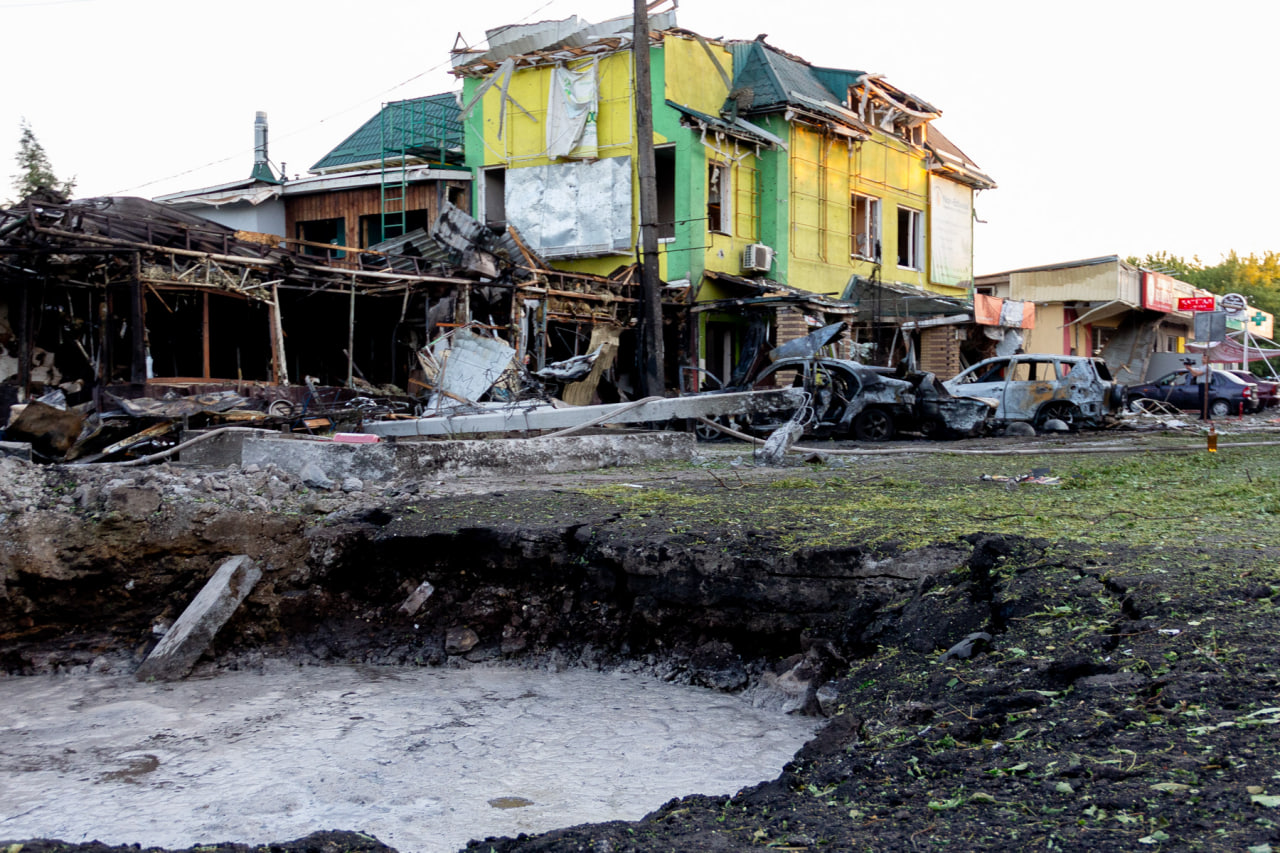
Destructions in Vilniansk after the attack

Russia claimed to have taken the village of Shumy, ten kilometers east of Toretsk.

Seven people were killed and 36 others were injured in a Russian attack in Vilniansk, Zaporizhzhia Oblast. Three people were killed in separate attacks in Donetsk and Kherson Oblasts.

Russian officials claimed that five people, including two children, were killed in a Ukrainian drone strike in Gorodishche, Kursk Oblast.

=== 30 June ===
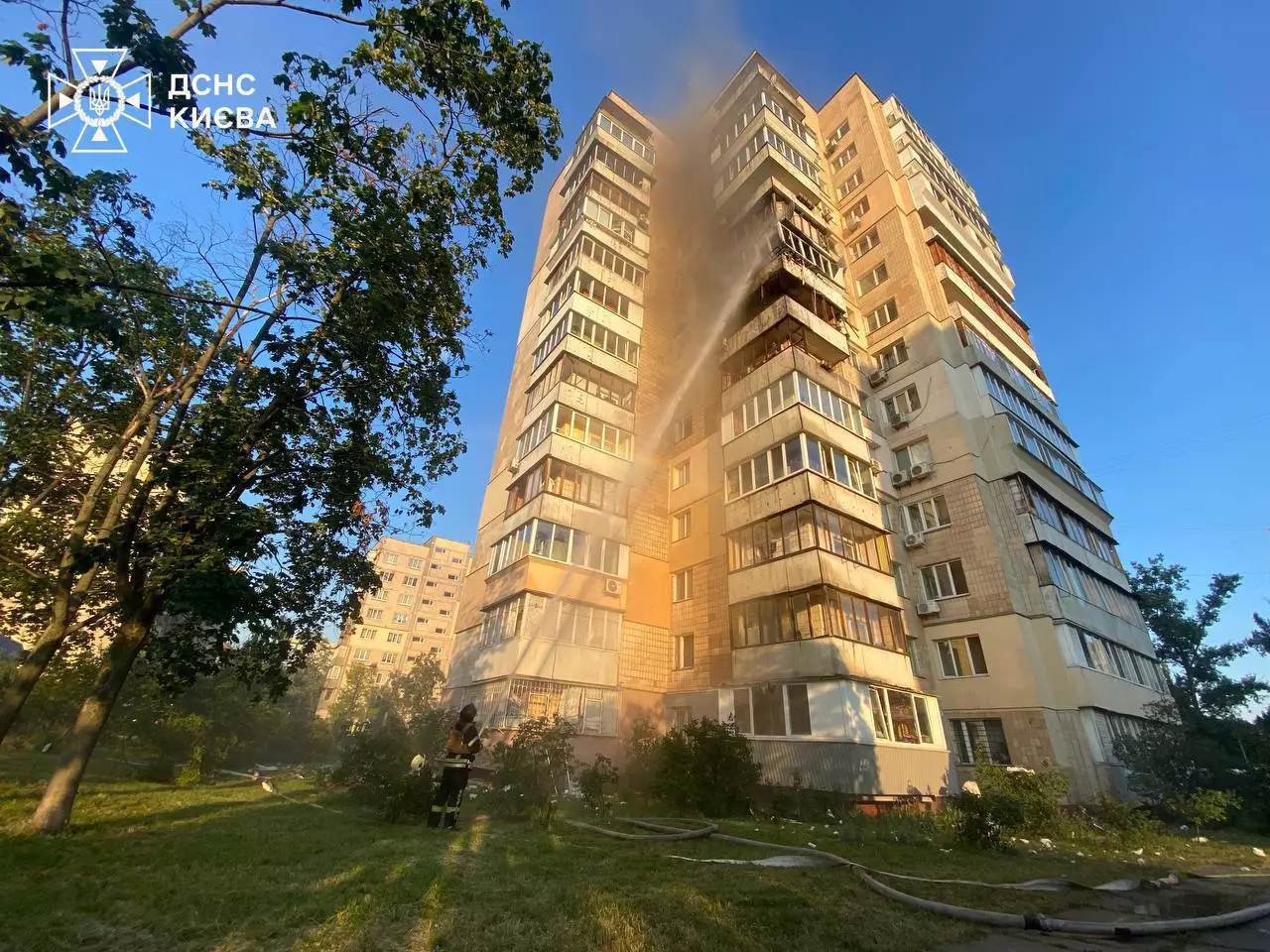
Residential building in Kyiv, damaged by missile fragments during an attack on 30 June

In Donetsk Oblast, Russian forces claimed to have taken control of the villages of Novooleksandrivka, northwest of Ocheretyne, and Spirne, near the border with Luhansk Oblast.

One person was killed in a Russian airstrike in Kharkiv.

The Russian defence ministry claimed to have shot down 36 Ukrainian drones, including two over Belgorod Oblast, four over Voronezh Oblast, nine over Lipetsk Oblast and two both over Oryol Oblast and Belgorod Oblasts. Fifteen drones were also downed over Kursk Oblast. There were no reports of damage or casualties.

== July 2024 ==
=== 1 July ===
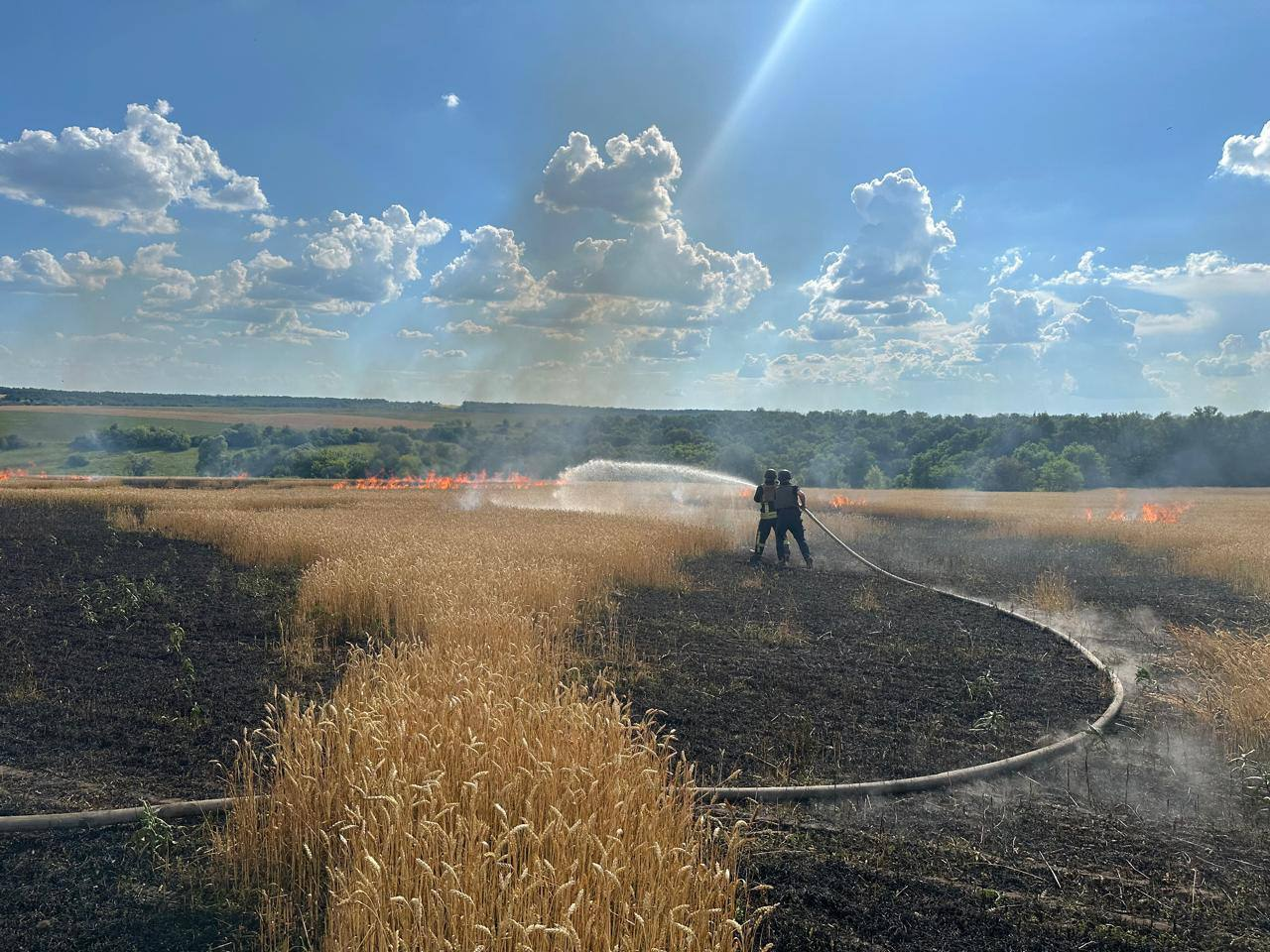
Wheat field in Kharkiv Oblast, burning due to shelling

Two people were killed by Russian shelling in Ukrainsk, Donetsk Oblast. One person was killed in a separate attack in Komar.

Russia launched an air attack on Myrhorod Air Base in Poltava Oblast. The Ukrainian Air Force acknowledged damage, with two of the base's six Su-27s destroyed by an Iskander missile with a cluster warhead.

A drone attack was reported in Sevastopol and other parts of Crimea, with the Ukrainian Air Force later claiming to have struck an ammunition dump using six Storm Shadow cruise missiles. The ammunition dump was also believed to host a "Shahed drone warehouse". Russian sources claimed that five aerial targets were shot down. Ukrainian drone attacks left parts of Belgorod Oblast without power. Ukrainian media reported that a drone strike the Oskol Electrometallurgical Plant, Russia's only full-cycle metallurgical enterprise, in Stary Oskol.

Scouts from the Ukrainian Rubizh Brigade captured "several dozen Russian soldiers", mostly mobilised conscripts, in an unspecified location.

Dutch defence minister Kajsa Ollongren announced that the export permits allowing the export of 24 F-16s to Ukraine had been granted, with their arrival set on a "confidential" date.

The SBU claimed to have foiled a coup by a Russian-backed group against the Ukrainian government that was scheduled on 30 July.

Russia claimed to have captured an ATACMS missile guidance system intact and was studying it to "identify any weak spots".

=== 2 July ===
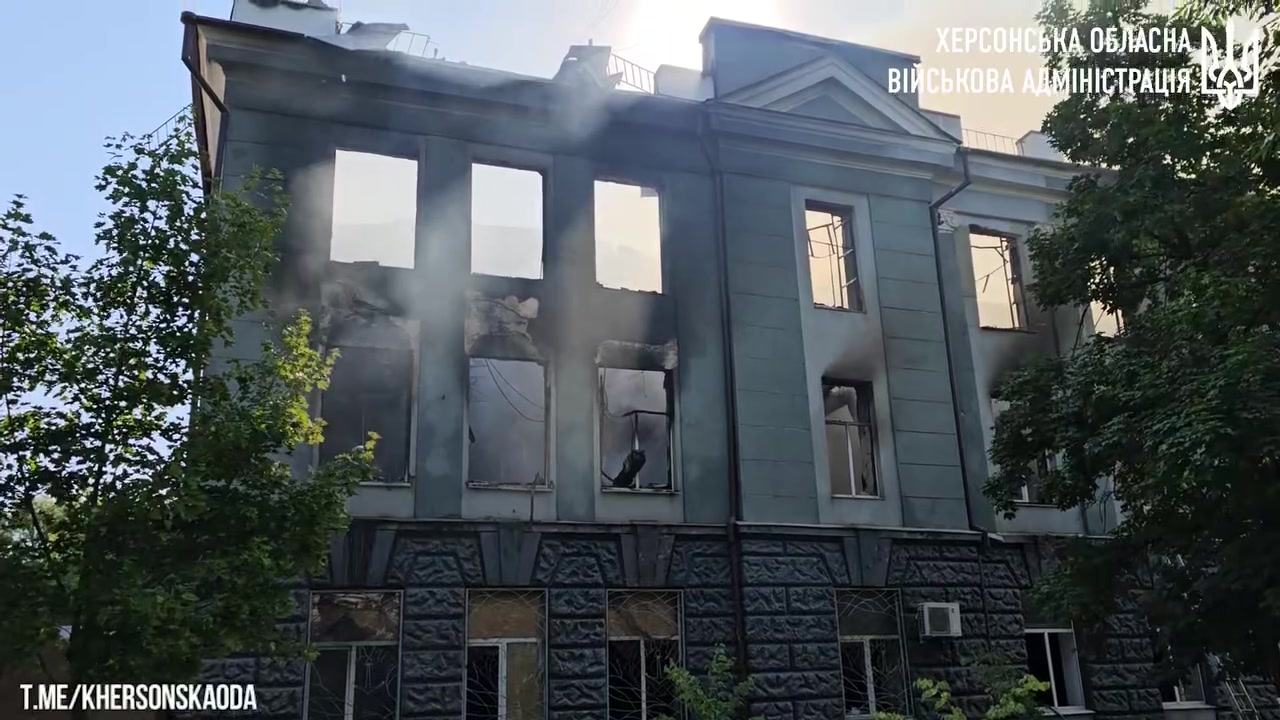
Maritime College of Kherson State Maritime Academy after Russian shelling on 2 July

Four people were killed in a Russian attack on Nikopol. A Russian Iskander strike on Myrhorod Air Base damaged or destroyed a Mil Mi-24 gunship helicopter.

A Ukrainian court convicted Leonid Pasechnik, the Russian-installed head of Luhansk Oblast, of collaboration and sentenced him in absentia to 12 years' imprisonment.

Over 3,000 Ukrainian prisoners were granted parole on condition that they join the Ukrainian military.

=== 3 July ===
Eight people were killed and at least 50 others were injured in Russian airstrikes in Dnipro. One person was killed in a missile attack near Poltava.

Russian forces claimed to have taken the Novy district of Chasiv Yar.

In Russia, the mayor of Novorossiysk, Andrey Kravchenko, reported that Ukrainian naval drones attacked the city's port but were repelled.

=== 4 July ===
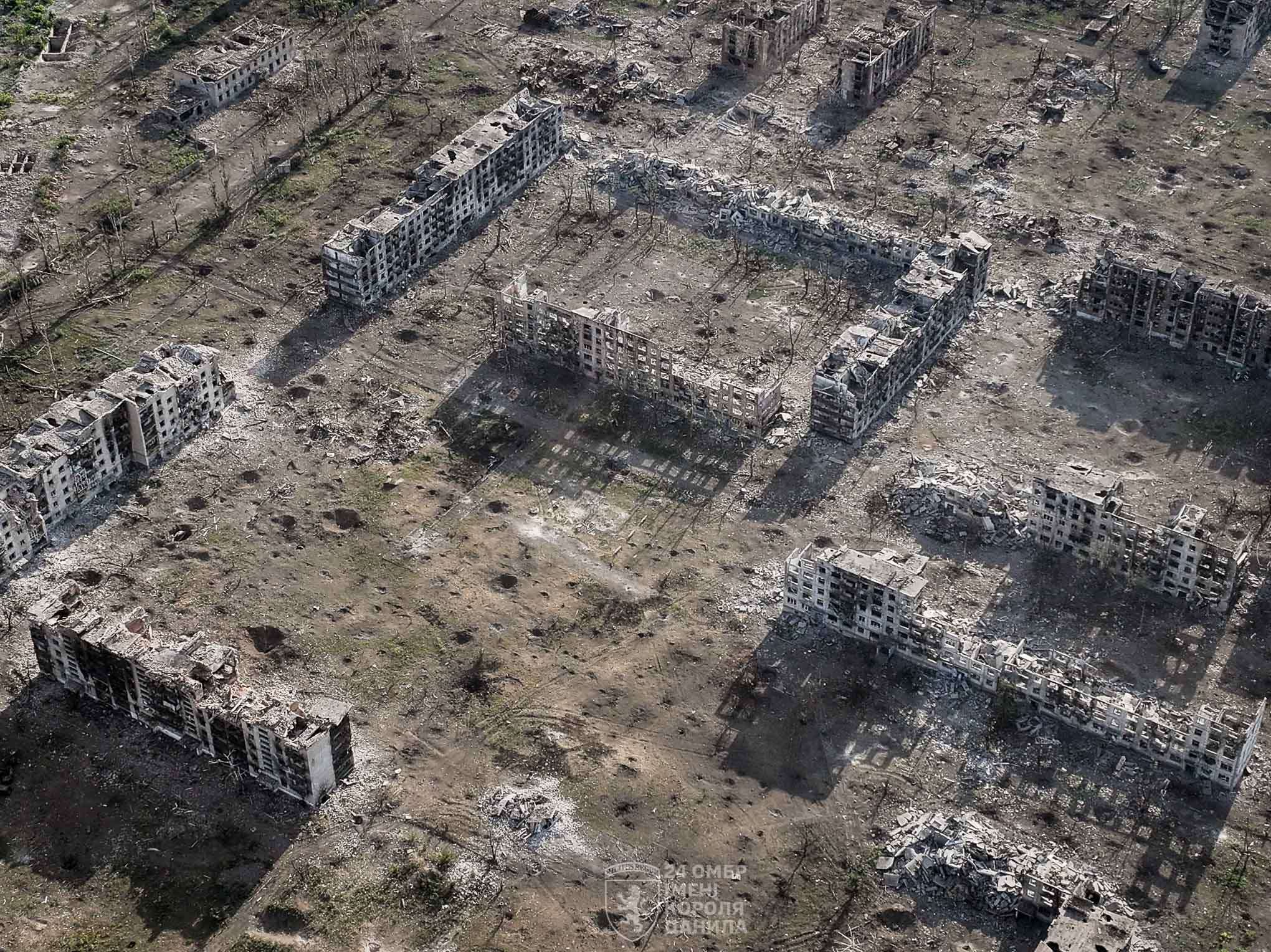
Ruins of Chasiv Yar, 4 July 2024

The Ukrainian military announced its withdrawal from the Kanal neighborhood of Chasiv Yar.

One person was killed in a Russian missile strike on Odesa, while another person was killed in a separate attack in Donetsk Oblast.

The Russian military destroyed a Ukrainian MiG-29 fighter jet in a missile strike at Krivoi Rog Air Base.

In Russia, the Tambov Gunpowder plant was struck by HUR drones. Russian officials denied any damage and reported all drones shot down. Civilian videos showed explosions in the area.

=== 5 July ===
One person was killed in a Russian airstrike in Donetsk Oblast.

In Russia, the governor of Rostov Oblast claimed that ten drones were shot down, causing a fire in Rostov-on-Don. The governor of Krasnodar Krai claimed that a child was killed in a drone attack in Primorsko-Akhtarsk.

=== 6 July ===
Russian forces claimed to have taken the village of Sokil, 30 kilometers northwest of Donetsk.

Russian officials claimed that Ukrainian drone strikes damaged houses and infrastructure in Belgorod Oblast and Krasnodar Krai. Aimed at targets in the Leningrad, Yeysk and Pavlovsk districts At Leningradskaya a fuel storage tank caught fire. In Yeysk a cell tower was reportedly damaged, one used by Russian operational headquarters. In Pavlovskaya village another fire was started at a fuel tank belonging to Lukoil.

The Ukrainian 45th separate artillery brigade claimed to have destroyed two targets in the Donetsk region. In Debaltseve an "enemy logistics centre" was shelled while in Novoluhanske, a R-330Zh Zhitel was "burned".

=== 7 July ===
Russian forces claimed to have taken the settlement of Chyhari (part of Pivdenne) in Donetsk Oblast.

Four people were killed after their vehicle struck a Russian-planted mine in Kharkiv Oblast.

Russian officials claimed that Iskander ballistic missiles destroyed two Patriot missile launchers in Odesa. The Ukrainian Air Force confirmed the attack but provided no further information.

The Ukrainian military claimed to have shot down a Russian Su-25 fighter jet over Donetsk Oblast.

Russian officials claimed that falling debris from Ukrainian drones set fire to a warehouse in Voronezh Oblast which contained explosives. Another drone was reported shot down over Belgorod Oblast.

Explosions were reported at a number of locations around occupied Melitopol, including the Melitopol Air Base, the railway station and other areas. Locals said that Russian air defence was activated during the incident.

=== 8 July ===
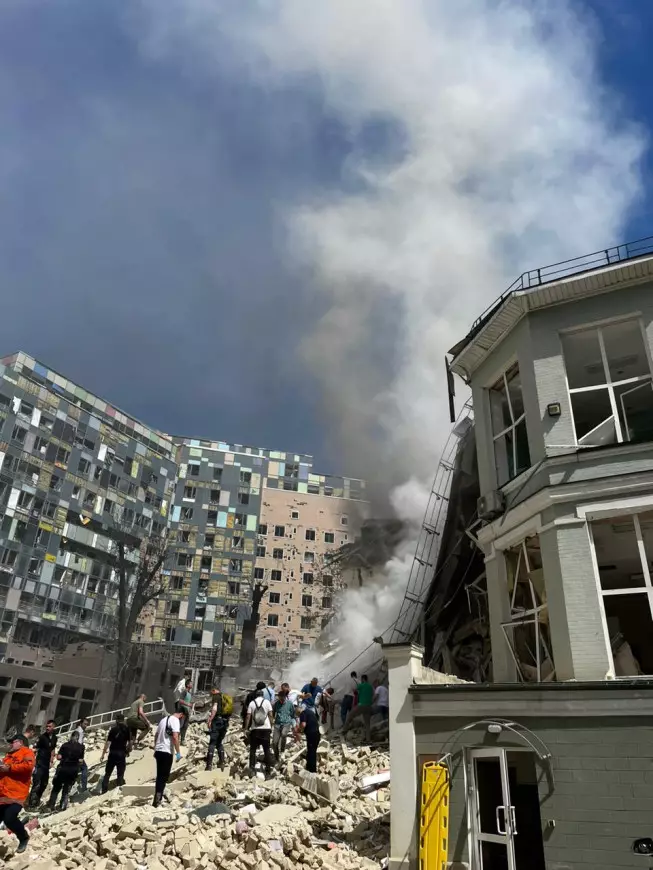
Pediatric hospital Okhmatdyt in Kyiv after the attack

Russia launched a wave of missile attacks across Ukraine, killing at least 47 people. At least 33 people were killed in Kyiv, where the country's largest pediatric hospital was struck. Ten people were killed in Kryvyi Rih, while three were killed in Pokrovsk and one in Dnipro. Attacks were also reported in Kramatorsk and Sloviansk. The Ukrainian Air Force claimed to have shot down 30 of 38 missiles launched during the attacks.

Ukraine and Poland signed a security agreement, forming a new volunteer unit called the Ukrainian Legion.

The FSB claimed to have foiled a Ukrainian plot which involved a pilot attempting to hijack a Tu-22 bomber.

=== 9 July ===
Two people were killed by Russian airstrikes in Odesa Oblast. One person was killed by shelling in Nikopol.

Russian forces claimed to have taken the village of Yasnobrodivka, 45 kilometers from Pokrovsk.

Russia claimed to have shot down 38 drones over Belgorod, Voronezh, Astrakhan, Kursk, and Rostov Oblasts. An oil depot was set on fire in Kalach-na-Donu, Volgograd Oblast, along with two power substations. Russian sources claimed one killed and two injured in Belgorod Oblast. Ukrainian drones struck a Russian missile testing facility at Kapustin Yar. Russian officials claimed more than 20 drones were shot down, while one drone crashed landed in a field. Subsequent satellite images showed scorch marks at the facility.

The United States Department of Justice announced that it had shut down 968 bot accounts on social media, particularly on X, that were operated by Russia and were used to spread pro-Russian and anti-Ukrainian misinformation through the usage of fictional American citizens.

=== 10 July ===
One person was killed in a Russian attack in Voznesensk, Mykolaiv Oblast. Eight others, including the town's mayor Yevhenii Velychko, were injured.

DeepStateMap.Live reported that Russia had captured the village of Yevhenivka.

Portugal agreed to supply Ukraine with 220 million euros in assistance during 2024 and 2025. Norway pledged six F-16s to Ukraine.

British Prime Minister Keir Starmer said that Ukraine can use Storm Shadow missiles “against military targets within Russian territory”.

An unspecified number of F-16 fighter jets were reported to be en route to Ukraine with the expectation that they will be operational by summer 2024.

=== 11 July ===
Ukraine seized the Cameroonian-flagged cargo vessel Usko Mfu off the coast of Odesa Oblast and arrested its Azerbaijani captain on suspicion of illegally exporting grain produced in Russian-occupied territories of Ukraine via Sevastopol.

On the sidelines of the NATO Washington summit, Australia announced its largest military aid package to Ukraine, consisting of A$250 million worth of ammunition, air defence and guided missiles, anti-tank weapons, and boots for soldiers. It was also announced that the ADF would join the newly established NATO command for Ukraine.

=== 12 July ===
In Donetsk Oblast, four people were killed by Russian shelling in Pokrovsk, while two others were also killed by shelling in Kostyantynivka.

France permitted its weapons to be used by Ukraine against military targets on Russian soil, provided they pose a threat to Ukraine and that the Kremlin would not be targeted.

Ukraine struck a Russian S-300V air defence system near Mariupol Airport.

=== 13 July ===
DeepStateMap.Live reported that Russia had recaptured the village of Urozhaine, Donetsk Oblast. Russia formally announced its seizure of the village on 14 July, while the Ukrainian military confirmed their withdrawal from the village on 18 July.

The head of the State Emergency Service in Kharkiv Oblast, Artem Kostyria, was killed along with a police officer in a double-tap Russian missile strike in Budy. Two people were killed in a separate attack near Kherson.

In Russia, the governor of Rostov Oblast claimed that an oil depot was set on fire by a drone strike in Tsimlyansky District.

Czech President Petr Pavel announced that Ukraine would receive 50,000 shells from July to August, with an additional 80,000-100,000 shells expected from September until the end of December.

=== 14 July ===
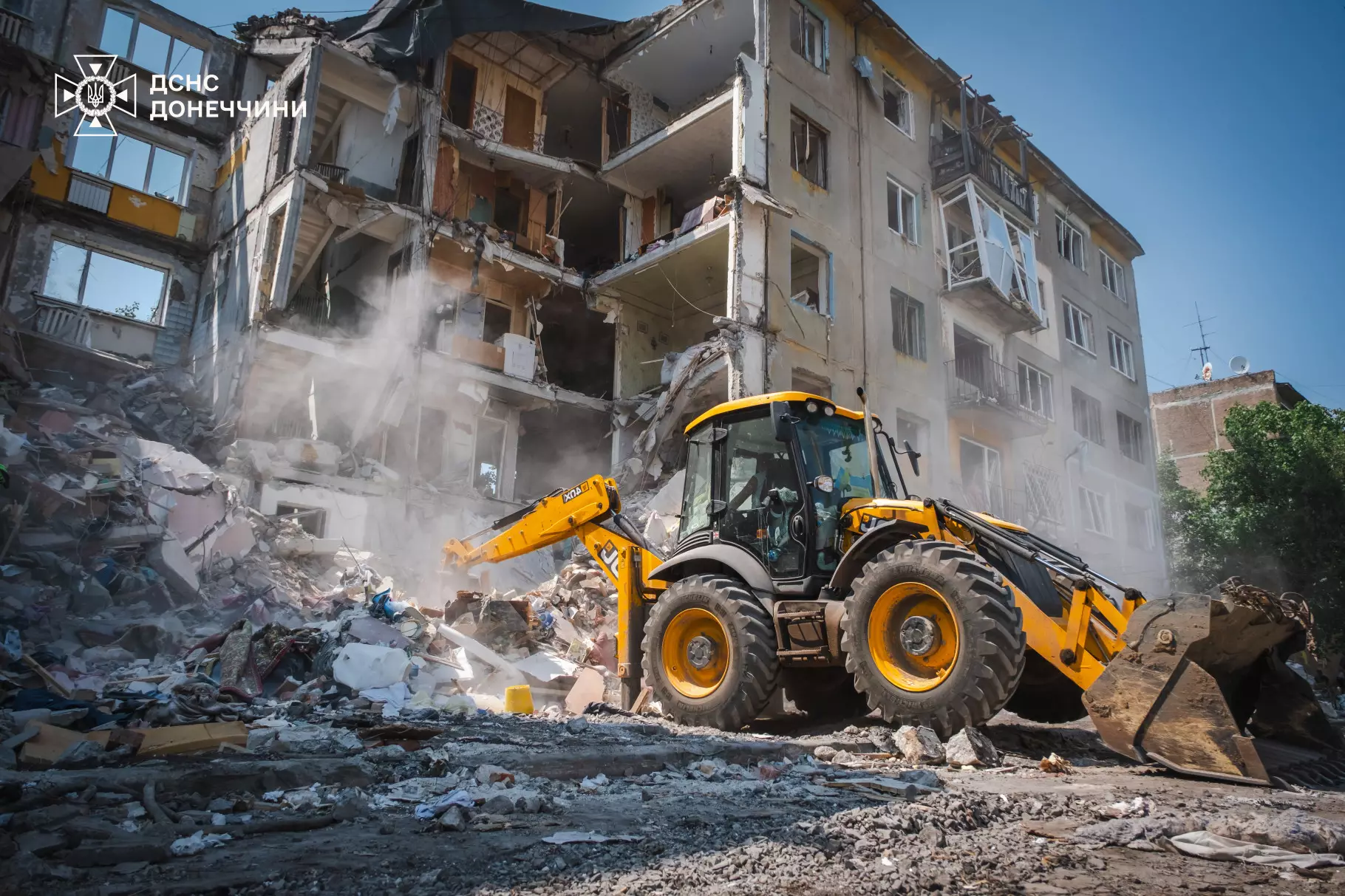
Residential building in Myrnohrad after the strike

Three people were killed in a Russian missile strike in Myrnohrad, Donetsk Oblast.

Ukrainian drones set fire to a TV tower in Sudzha, Kursk Oblast, according to the acting governor.

=== 15 July ===
The Russian-installed governor of Sevastopol claimed that a house was damaged by falling drone debris near Cape Fiolent. The Russian defence ministry claimed that six drones were shot down over Crimea.

The HUR and volunteer hackers carried out a cyberattack on websites in Russia belonging to entities involved in the war effort against Ukraine.

In Russia, the governor of Lipetsk Oblast claimed that an electrical substation was struck by a drone in Stanovlyansky District, while the governor of Bryansk Oblast claimed that 15 drones were shot down over five districts.

Lithuania and Vilnius Combined Heat and Power Plant gave Ukraine equipment for a thermal power plant.

=== 16 July ===
In Russia, six people were wounded in drone attacks in Belgorod, Voronezh and Kursk Oblasts. Ukrainian drones set fire to an “electrical devices” factory in Korenevo, Kursk Oblast, wounding one. Four were wounded by shelling in Belgorod and one was wounded by a drone in Voronezh Oblast. The Russian Defence Ministry claimed thirteen drones were shot down. In response to the attacks, the governor of Belgorod Oblast announced restrictions on entering 14 settlements bordering Ukraine.

The Ukrainian military claimed to have struck a Russian S-300 missile system and a radar station in Donetsk Oblast.

=== 17 July ===
The Ukrainian military said that its positions in Krynky had been destroyed by Russian attacks, but denied that it had retreated from the village. However, many sources stated that Ukrainian forces had completely withdrawn from the village.

In Donetsk Oblast, Russian forces took the village of Spirne.

In Russia, the governor of Belgorod Oblast claimed that two people were killed in a drone strike on the border village of Tserkovny.

Russia and Ukraine conducted a prisoner exchange involving 95 POWs on each side following an agreement brokered by the UAE.

=== 18 July ===
In Crimea, the Russian-installed governor of Sevastopol claimed that a naval drone was intercepted while attempting to attack the city. SBU naval and aerial drones also attacked a Russian coast guard base on Lake Donuzlav during a Russian naval exercise, hitting the base headquarters, ammunition depot, a power substation and technical facilities.

Ukraine claimed to have shot down a Russian drone over Kyiv with no casualties recorded.

The Freedom of Russia Legion claimed to have launched an attack on the Bolshoye Savino airport in Perm hosting MiG-31 fighters. A video released showed two KAMAZ trucks burning, with the group claiming to have destroyed “several units of military equipment.”

Ukrainian Prime Minister Denys Shmyhal announced the extension of a system to jam Russian TV and radio broadcasts into Donetsk, Mykolaiv, Kherson, and Zaporizhzhia Oblasts.

=== 19 July ===
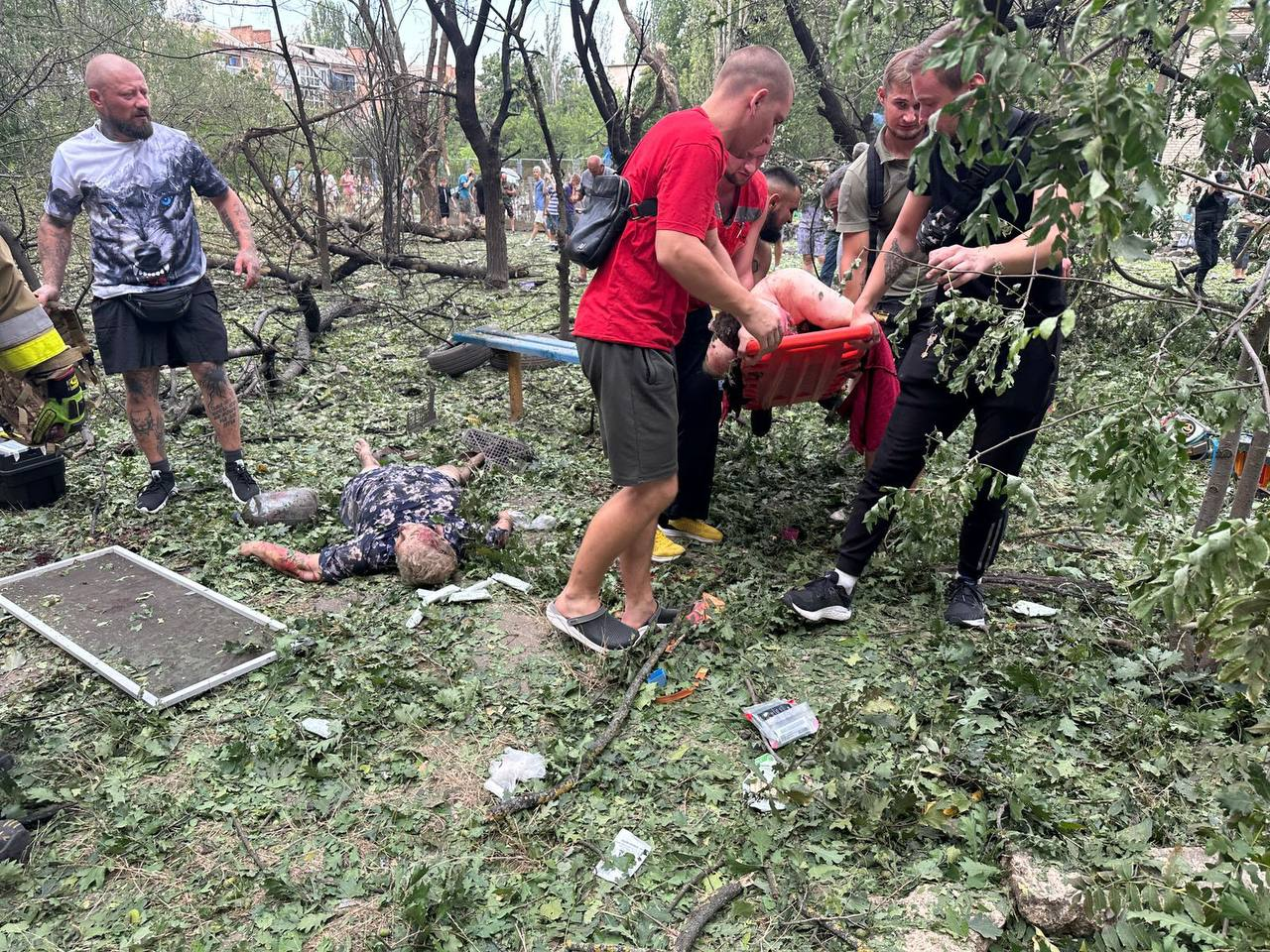
Victims and destructions in Mykolaiv after the attack

Russian forces captured the village of Prohres in Donetsk Oblast; DeepStateMap.Live additionally reported the fall of Rozdolivka to the Russians.

Four people, including a child, were killed in a Russian missile attack on Mykolaiv. Two people were killed by shelling in Bilozerka, Kherson Oblast.

The Ukrainian military claimed to have shot down a Russian Su-25 aircraft over Donetsk Oblast. A Russian Ka-52 was shot down by an Uragan rocket in an undisclosed location and date, killing its crew.

=== 20 July ===
Russia claimed to have taken the villages of Pishchane in Kharkiv Oblast and Andriivka in Luhansk Oblast.

Two people were killed in a Russian aistrike in Barvinkove, Kharkiv Oblast.

In Russia, the governor of Rostov Oblast, Vasily Golubev, reported that 26 Ukrainian drones were shot down overnight with no casualties. Sixteen explosions were also reported near Millerovo air base, during which fires were reported near the base's runway, airport apron and an oil depot.

=== 21 July ===
President Zelenskyy claimed that one Ukrainian soldier killed is killed for every six to eight wounded. Russian losses, according to him, were one killed for every two to three wounded.

A Russian platoon commander from an unidentified Russian motor rifle brigade claimed in an interview that his brigade, with an established strength of 6,000 personnel, had lost 12,000 killed or wounded in Ukraine, or 200% of its strength.

Sabotage organised by HUR damaged three helicopters, namely an Mi-8, Ka-226 and an Mi-28, at the JSC Russian Helicopters facility in Moscow.

=== 22 July ===
Ukrainian drones set fire to an oil refinery at Tuapse, Krasnodar Krai. Russian officials claimed the fire was put out, with no casualties and no “serious damage”. Russian air defence shot down some 75 drones over night over the Black and Azov Seas and over Belgorod, Voronezh, Smolensk and Rostov Oblasts.

Mamuka Mamulashvili, the commander of the pro-Ukrainian militia Georgian National Legion, claimed that the State Security Service of Georgia placed about 300 members of the group on a wanted list.

Boeing and Antonov signed a memorandum of understanding to collaborate on drone production and maintenance.

=== 23 July ===
The Russian military claimed to have taken the village of Ivano-Daryivka, 30 kilometers northeast of Bakhmut, although the village had been under Russian occupation since 17 July.

In Russia, the governor of Krasnodar Krai claimed that a Ukrainian drone attack on a ferry in Port Kavkaz killed one, wounded one and started a fire on board the vessel. The Russian defence ministry claimed that 21 drones had been shot down over the Black Sea and in Crimea.

The Ukrainian military claimed to have shot down a Russian Su-25 fighter jet over Donetsk Oblast.

A Ukrainian HIMARS strike hit a Russian 1K148 Yastreb-AV counter-battery radar in Zuhres, Donetsk Oblast.

The SBU arrested a former host and journalist on suspicion of inciting armed resistance against mobilisation into the Ukrainian military on social media.

EU foreign policy chief Josep Borrell stripped Hungary of its right to host a meeting of EU foreign and defence ministers scheduled on 28–30 August due to Prime Minister Viktor Orban's meeting with Putin and his accusations against the EU having a "pro-war policy".

Ukraine's Tavria operational-strategic group claimed that there were 90,000 Russian troops in Zaporizhzhia Oblast, and that 2,000 of them had joined in recent weeks.

=== 24 July ===
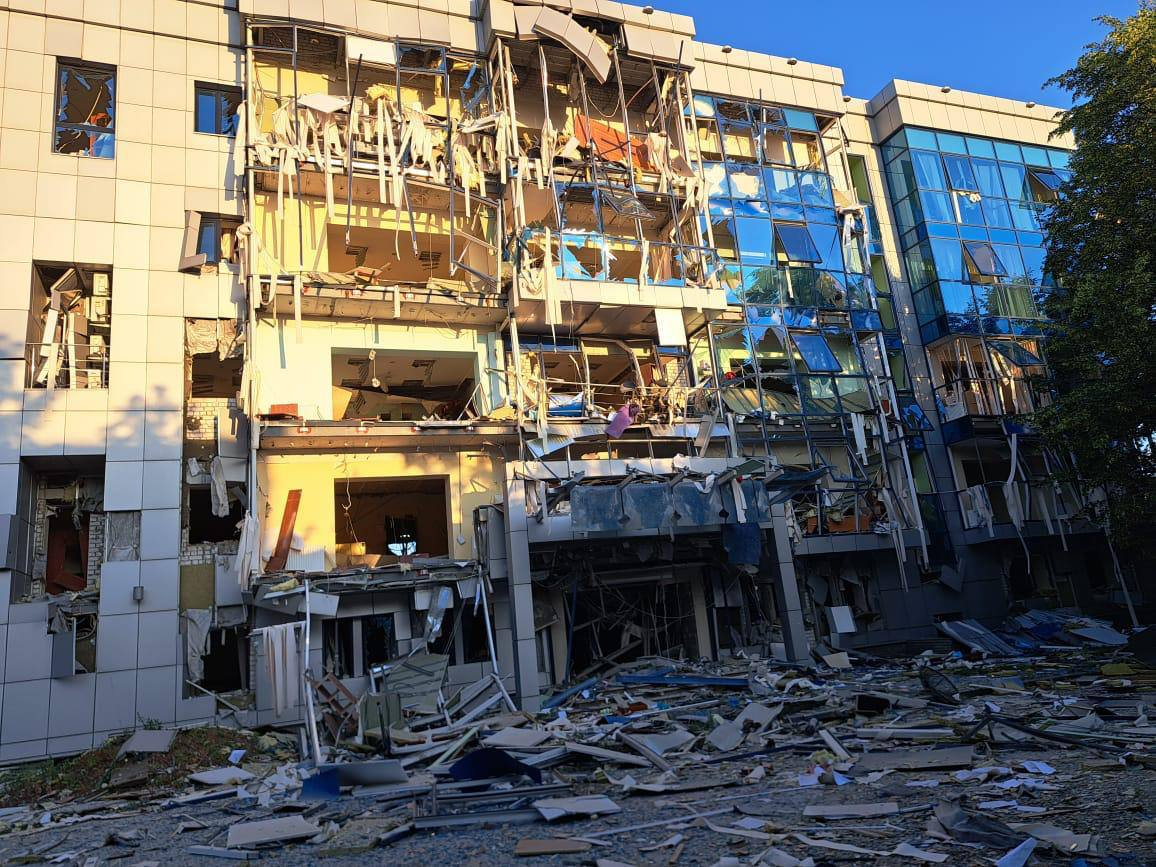
Headquarters of Mine Action FSD in Kharkiv after the strike

The headquarters of the Swiss charity Mine Action FSD, in Kharkiv, was struck by a Russian ballistic missile.

The Ukrainian 79th Tavrian Air Assault Brigade claimed to have repelled a major Russian assault on Kurakhove, inflicting losses of 12 motorcycles destroyed, six tanks and seven armoured vehicles damaged, 40 Russian soldiers killed and 37 others injured.

Ukrainian media reported that the HUR carried out a cyberattack on several banks operating in Russia and other financial institutions in the country.

Ukrainian soldiers of the "Khortytsia" group, based in Kharkiv, shot other Ukrainian soldiers due to "personal" issues, killing three soldiers and wounding four.

A GRU officer and his wife were injured in a car bombing in Moscow.

The Ukrainians claimed that Russian losses in Vovchansk include the 138th Separate Guards Motor Rifle Brigade, the 83rd Tank Regiment and the 157th Tank Regiment. According to Vitaly Sarantsev, spokesman for Ukraine’s operational-tactical group Kharkiv, "the staff number of motorized rifle brigades in the Russian Federation is up to 5,000 personnel, and tank regiments have 94 units of equipment (tanks)". He claimed that Russian losses (killed, wounded, or captured) for "roughly a division's worth of personnel" were 91 percent. (Note: An earlier Ukrainian source estimated the strength of a Russian tank regiment at 94 tanks.)

=== 25 July ===
Russia took the village of Yasnobrodivka in Donetsk Oblast.

Russian forces managed to nearly surround two battalions of the Ukrainian 31st Mechanized Brigade near Prohres. Later, according to DeepState, the 31st Mechanized Brigade broke out of the encirclement on the Pokrovsk axis.

In Russia, the governor of Belgorod Oblast claimed that one person was killed and two others were injured by Ukrainian shelling in Shebekino.

Romanian authorities said that debris from a Russian drone was recovered from the border town of Plauru following an air attack on Izmail.

Denmark and the Netherlands pledged to deliver 14 Leopard 2A4 tanks to Ukraine, according to Dutch Defense Minister Ruben Brekelmans.

HUR special forces attacked Russian forces at the Kuweires airbase in Syria, destroying an electronic warfare station.

=== 26 July ===
Russian forces captured the village of Lozuvatske in Donetsk Oblast, 24 kilometers east of Pokrovsk.

The FSB announced the arrest of a suspect in the 24 July car bombing in Moscow who had been extradited from Turkey, claiming that he was a Russian national who carried out the attack on behalf of Ukrainian intelligence.

Explosions were reported at Saky airfield in Crimea, and a drone attack on Sevastopol was reported. Russian authorities claimed that 21 drones were shot down over Bryansk Oblast.

=== 27 July ===
One person was killed by Russian shelling in Sumy Oblast.

Ukrainian drones struck the Olenya air base in Murmansk Oblast, some 1,800 kilometers from the Ukrainian border, damaging two Tu-22M3s. Engels and Dyagilevo airfields were also attacked, along with an oil refinery in Ryazan. Russian air defence claimed to have shot down 12 drones over various oblasts.

The Ukrainian 79th Air Assault Brigade again claimed to have repulsed a Russian assault east of Kurakhove, killing 23 Russian soldiers and injuring 29, as well as destroying a tank and two AFVs.

=== 28 July ===
NASA's FIRMS detected the fires in and around Polevaya, Kursk Oblast from 2024-07-27 23:09:00 (UTC) to 2024-07-29 11:13:00 (UTC)

In Russia, Acting Governor of Kursk Oblast, Alexei Smirnov, claimed that drone attacks caused fires in two districts, including at an oil depot in Polevaya, Kursk Oblast. Smirnov wrote on Telegram that three storage tanks caught fire, requiring 82 firefighters and 32 units of equipment. Another two drones were reported shot down over the oblast by the defence ministry. Smirnov claimed that falling debris damaged residential buildings and injured one person. The fires were detected by NASA's FIRMS.

=== 29 July ===
Russian forces took the villages of Novoselivka Persha, 20 kilometers northwest of Avdiivka, and Vovche in Donetsk Oblast.

The Russian defence ministry claimed to have intercepted 39 Ukrainian drones over five oblasts. Local media and officials claimed power failures along the western border due to damage caused by drone strikes. A fire occurred at an electrical substation in Tomarovka, Belgorod Oblast, and a power station in Glazunovka, Oryol Oblast was reported damaged, while falling debris damaged a “critical infrastructure facility” in Ostrogozhsky, Voronezh Oblast.

Ukrainian authorities announced the arrest of six people in Odesa on suspicion of burning 15 military vehicles on behalf of Russia.

=== 30 July ===
Russia claimed to have taken the village of Pivdenne, east of Toretsk.

The Ukrainian 79th Tavrian Air Assault Brigade claimed to have repelled a major Russian assault on Kurakhove, inflicting losses of 12 armored vehicles, eight tanks, nine motorcycles, and one buggy destroyed, 36 Russian soldiers killed and 32 others injured.

The Ukrainian military claimed to have struck an oil depot in Russia's Kursk Oblast following an air attack.

=== 31 July ===
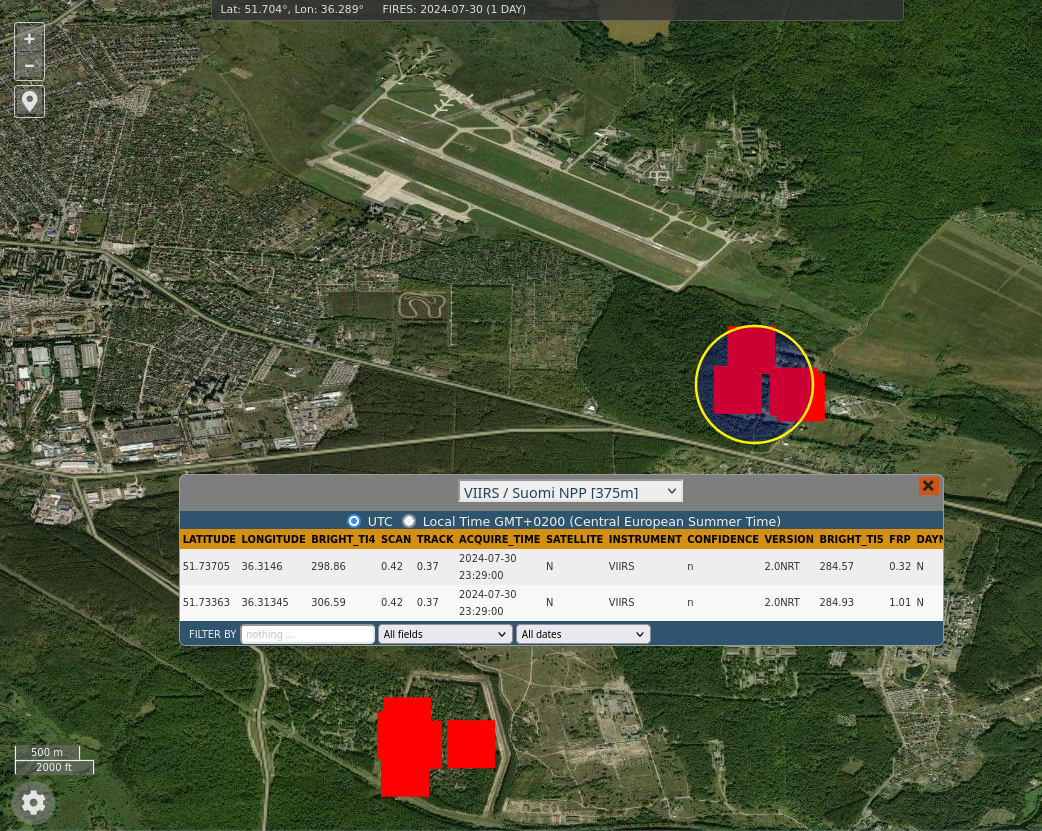
NASA's FIRMS detected fires 30 July 23:29:00 (UTC) at two military facilities south of Khalino airbase

Russian forces captured the village of Tymofiivka in Donetsk Oblast.

Russia launched a massive drone attack on Kyiv, with Ukrainian forces claiming to have intercepted 40 drones.

Russian forces claimed to have intercepted a Neptune-MD missile and 19 drones over Belgorod, Bryansk, Kursk, Kaluga, and Rostov Oblasts as well as in Crimea. The acting governor of Kursk, Alexei Smirnov, said that an “unidentified facility” caught fire after midnight. Ukraine claimed it was a “storage facility for weapons and military equipment”. In Belgorod, commercial and residential properties caught fire. No casualties were reported in the attacks. The Belgorod governor also claimed Ukrainian forces fired six cluster shells at buildings.

The Freedom of Russia Legion announced its withdrawal from the Irpin Declaration, but said that it would continue to fight Kremlin forces.

A Russian Mi-8 helicopter was shot down over occupied Donetsk, speculated to be either by a Ukrainian FPV drone or by Russian fire.

Ukraine received its first F-16s.

Austrian military analyst Col. Markus Reisner, citing a recent military study, estimated that Russian forces had lost between 500,000 and 750,000 soldiers killed and wounded in action, with "perhaps" 100,000 to 150,000 Russian soldiers killed. He also said that Ukraine had "suffered very heavy losses".

== See also ==
- 2024 in Russia
- 2024 in Ukraine
- Outline of the Russo-Ukrainian War
- Bibliography of Ukrainian history
- War crimes in the Russian invasion of Ukraine
- List of wars involving Russia
