= Azarkh =

Azarkh or Azarh (Yiddish: אזארך, Russian: Азарх) is a Yiddish surname. Notable people with the surname include:

- Abram Azarkh, birth name of Alexis Granowsky, Jewish Russian and German theatre and film director
- Boris Azarkh, birth name of Boris Ingster, Russian and American screenwriter, film and television director, and producer
- Lana Azarkh, Soviet artist and animator
- Raisa Azarh, Jewish Soviet physician and author
- Yevgeniya Azarkh, Soviet Ukrainian film and stage actress

== See also ==
- Zarh
