= Jeanne Devereaux =

Ballerina

Jeanne Devereaux (1912–2011) was an American prima ballerina, starting as a child star at age 11 and continuing for the next four decades.

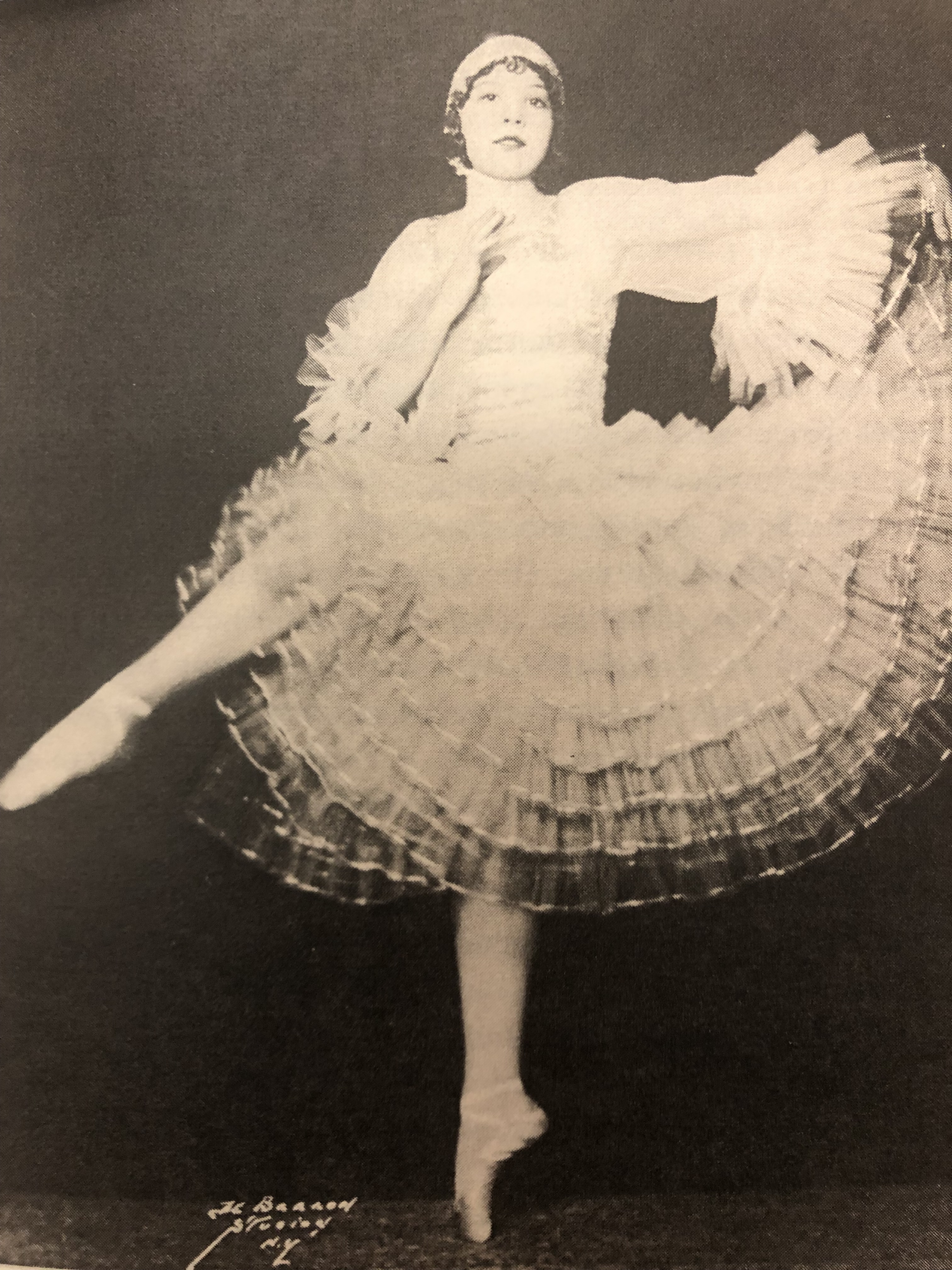
Publicity photo taken in 1927 of Jeanne Devereaux, at age 14, for her performance in the Broadway musical Manhattan Mary. (Photo by Le Barron Studios)

Born Jean Eleanor Helman, she performed as Jeanne Devereaux, taking the last name of her grandmother, Jeanette (Devereaux) Lane. She was a headliner at Radio City Music Hall, performing on Broadway and the burlesque circuit, and danced on stages around the world. During her career, she gave 6,000 paid performances, as well as 500 free benefit performances.

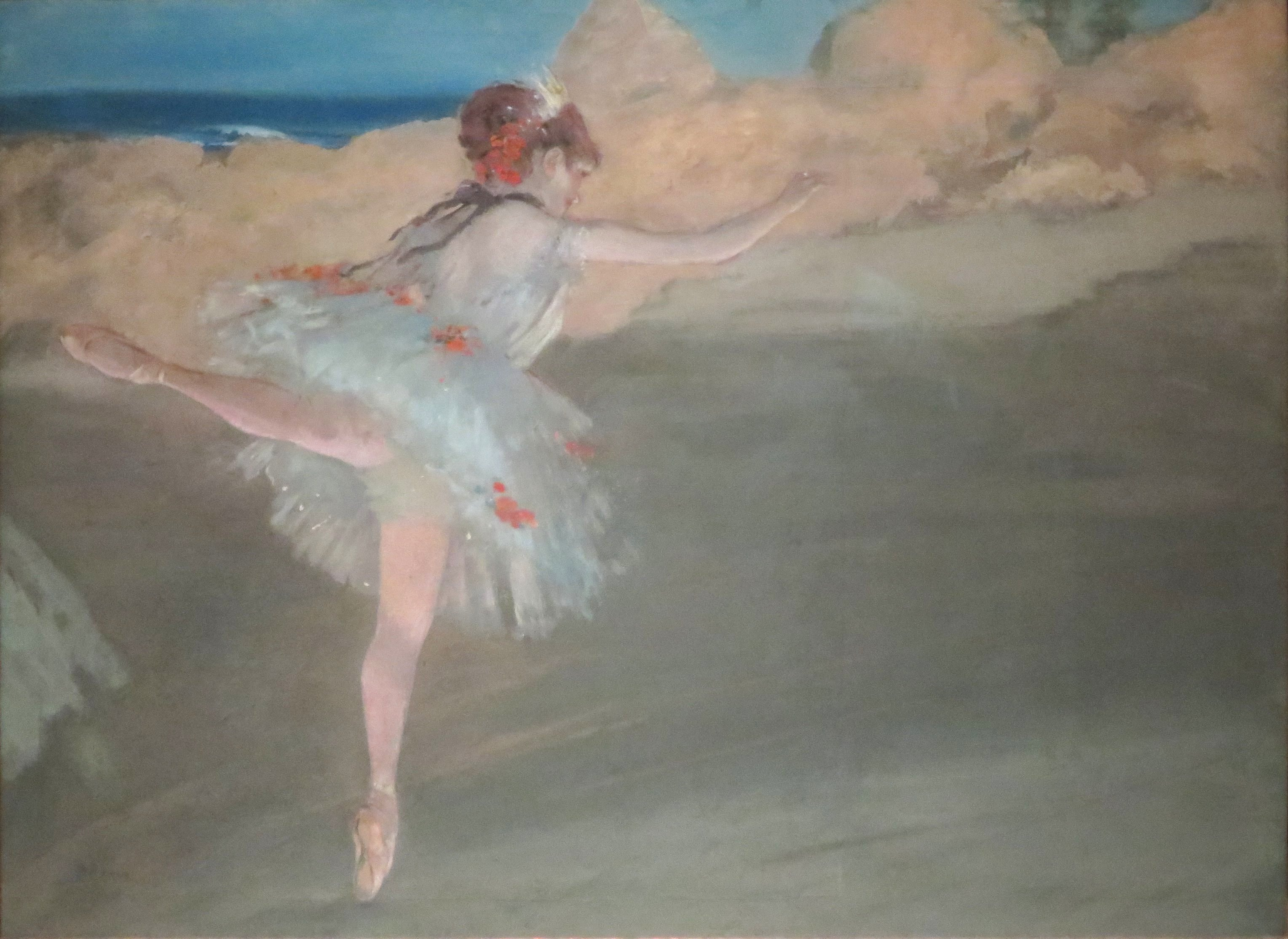
"The Star - Dancer in Pointe" by Edgar Degas, Norton Simon Museum

She was the sole support for her mother, who traveled with her and managed her career, with financial ups and downs that included numerous periods between bookings of being nearly destitute. They often had to live with her grandparents in Pasadena, California, for months at a time. In October 1935, she was the first American prima ballerina to perform in front of King George V and Queen Mary at a Royal Command Performance at the London Palladium. She performed with various civic light opera companies across the United States, and in World War II did USO tours.

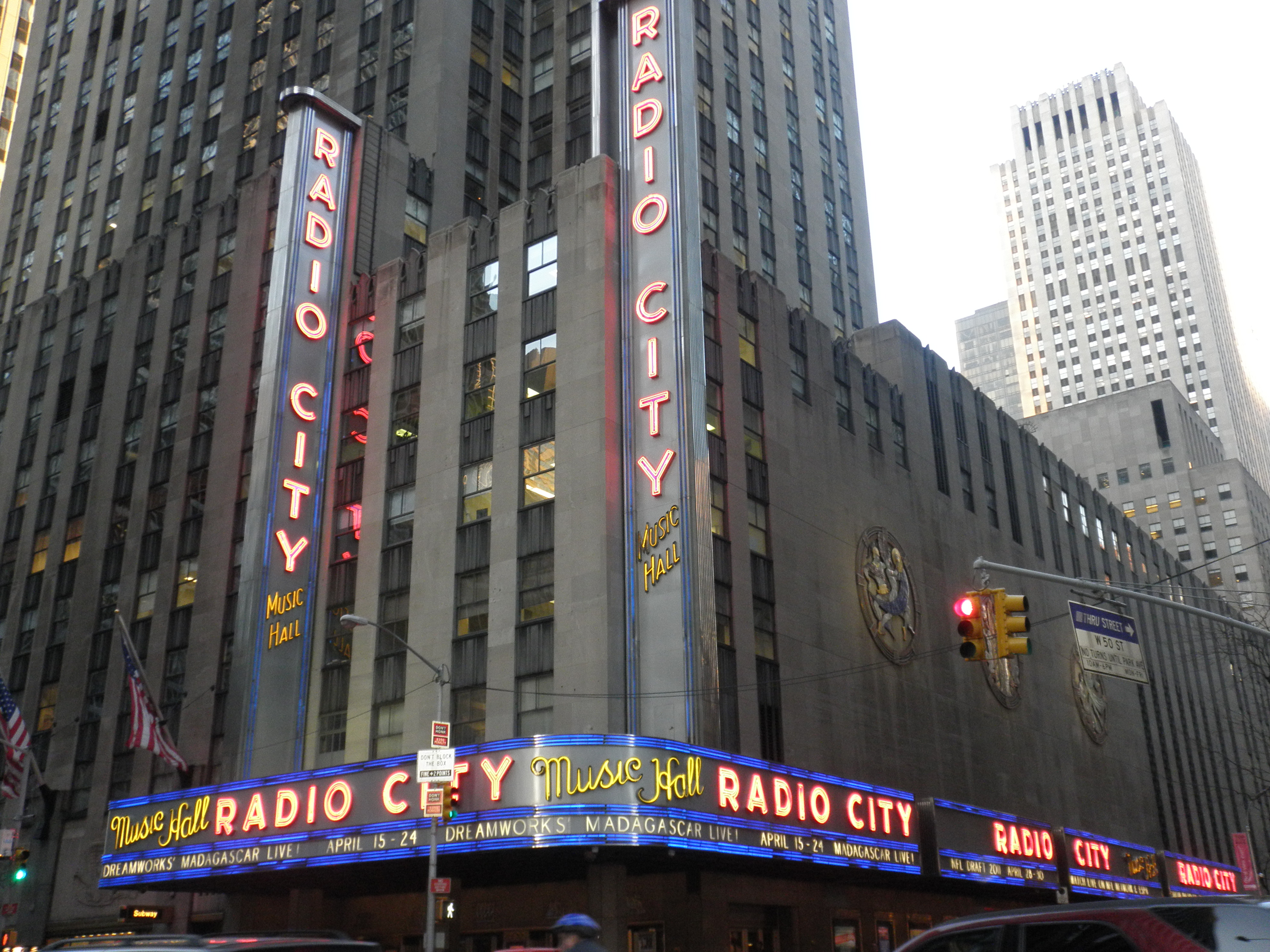
Radio City Music Hall, New York City

In the 1930–31, she made two motion pictures, a Fox musical comedy called "Are You There?" and a Warner Bros. picture called "Kiss Me Again." On May 17, 1949, she performed on Milton Berle's television show "Texaco Star Theater."

In 1952, she married engineer Thomas Gardiner Perkins, which finally brought financial security to her life. She opened the Devereaux Ballet Arts School in Pasadena, California, initially in their home and later in a studio due to zoning restrictions. The two of them also operated a business designing and building museum display cases. She became a popular lecturer on historical topics and conducted extensive research at the Huntington Library on Grace Nicholson, whose home is now the USC Pacific Asia Museum. She died peacefully in 2011, aged 99, one of the last vaudevillians.
