= Yevhen Yakovenko =

Ukrainian politician

- Євген Яковенко
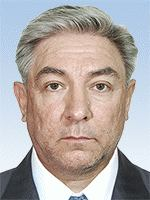
- Official portrait, 2019

People's Deputy of Ukraine
- Incumbent
- Assumed office 29 August 2019
- Preceded by: Ihor Shkiria
- Constituency: Donetsk Oblast, No. 52

Personal details
- Born: 6 June 1965 (age 61) Osh, Kirghiz SSR, Soviet Union (now Kyrgyzstan)
- Party: Independent
- Other political affiliations: Batkivshchyna
- Education: Dnipro Polytechnic

Military service
- Allegiance: Soviet Union
- Branch/service: Soviet Army
- Years of service: 1984–1986

Yevhen Hennadiyovych Yakovenko (Ukrainian: Євген Геннадійович Яковенко; born 6 June 1965) is a Ukrainian entrepreneur and politician currently serving as a People's Deputy of Ukraine from Ukraine's 52nd electoral district, representing Toretsk, Debaltseve, Svitlodarsk, and the Kalininskyi District of Horlivka. An independent, he was elected as a member of the Batkivshchyna party.

== Early life and career ==
Yevhen Hennadiyovych Yakovenko was born on 6 June 1965, in the city of Osh in the Kirghiz Soviet Socialist Republic of the Soviet Union. He attended school at School No. 16 in the village of New York (then known as Novhorodske), and served in the Soviet Army from 1984 to 1986 before becoming a miner in Toretsk. He is a graduate of the Dnipro Polytechnic mining institute, as well as the National Academy of Internal Affairs, majoring in law.

Yakovenko has been accused of participating in the smuggling of starch during the 1990s, and has earned the nickname of "Starch Zhenya" (Ukrainian: Женя-Крохмаль) It has additionally been claimed by activists of the "Civil Security Council" organisation that he was active in the cigarette trade, also partaking in smuggling in Transnistria and Europe.

From 2001 to 2019, Yakovenko was director of the Alkon Trade and Industrial Company.

== Political career ==
In the 2019 Ukrainian parliamentary election, Yakovenko ran as the Batkivshchyna candidate in Ukraine's 52nd electoral district, which was partially under the control of the Donetsk People's Republic at the time of his election. His main opponent was Oleh Pohodin, a candidate of the Opposition Platform — For Life (OPZZh) party. While Pohodin was actively supported by leading OPZZh figures such as Yuriy Boyko and Viktor Medvedchuk, Yakovenko, who was formally an independent, distanced himself from party politics.

Yakovenko won election to the 52nd electoral district, winning 28.96% of the vote to Pohodin's 26%, with 781 votes of difference. Following his victory, Bohodin and other OPZZh politicians accused Yakovenko of vote-buying and fraud. The Central Election Commission, however, recognised Yakovenko as the winner of the election. It has additionally been alleged that Yakovenko bribed police and military officials to support his campaign.

Following his election, Yakovenko chose not to join Batkivshchyna in the Verkhovna Rada (Ukraine's parliament), instead taking office as an independent. He did not join any committees, but has participated in inter-parliamentary assemblies with Uzbekistan, Tajikistan, and Moldova. He has participated in the writing of three draft laws, and has been not present for at least 90 sessions of the Verkhovna Rada.

In 2022, Yakovenko was detained while crossing the Moldova–Ukraine border, at the request of Belarus. According the head of Interpol's Chișinău bureau, Yakovenko is wanted by Belarus for bribery and corruption.

== Personal life and wealth ==
Little is known about Yakovenko's personal life. He is married to Olga Yakovenko, who is also known to play a role in Alkon Trade and Industrial Company. As of 2021, he lives in Dnipro. Yakovenko and his wife have ₴1,900,000, €830,000, and US$950,000 of declared assets, in addition to several properties, a 2005 Lada Niva Travel, a 2017 Lexus LX 450, a 2018 Lexus LS 500h, a 2013 Audi A4, and a 2003 Mercedes-Benz s430.
