= Yoshio Ikezaki =

Japanese-American paper artist, born 1953

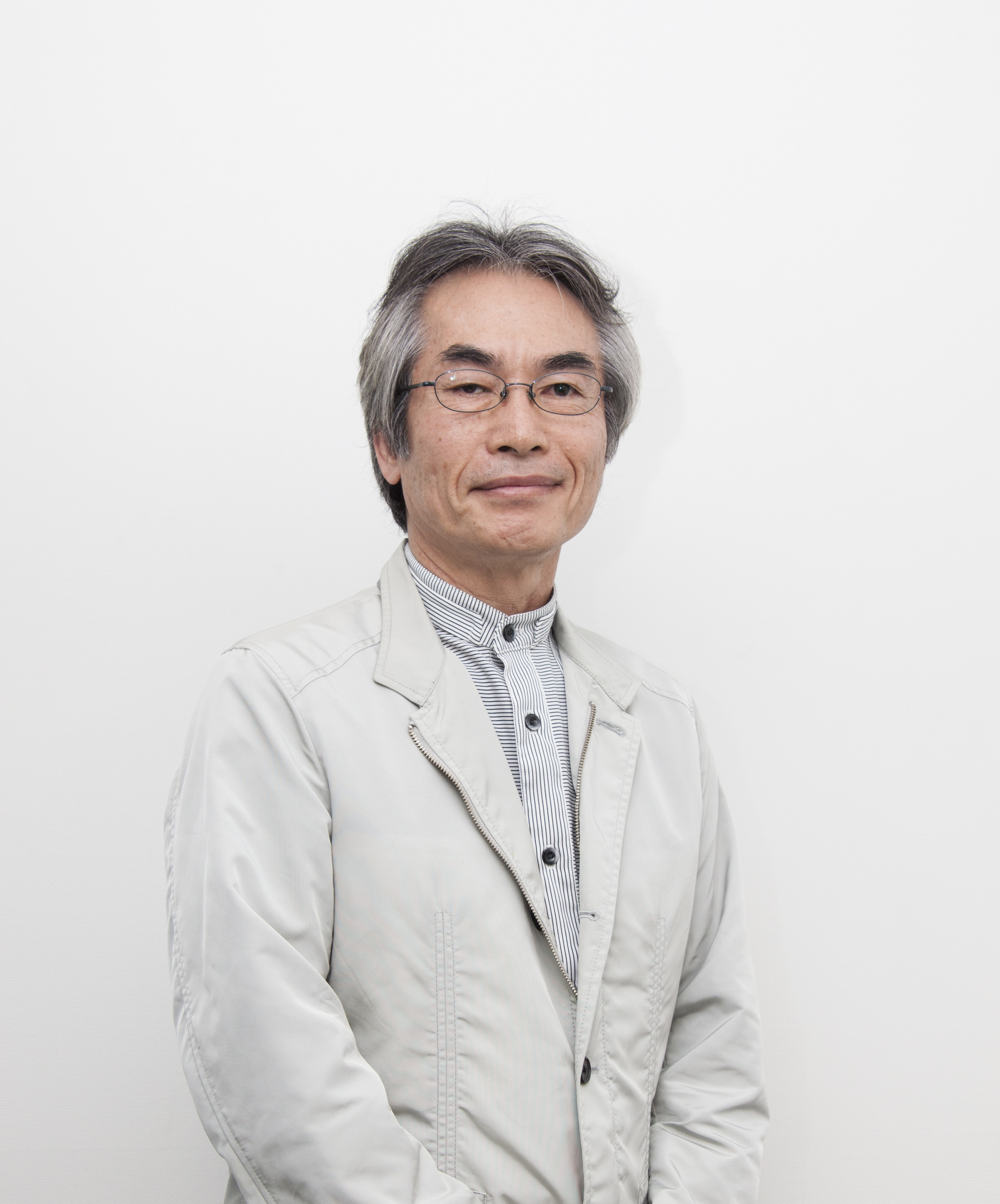
- Born: January 12, 1953 (age 73)); Kitakyushu, Japan
- Education: Florida State University
- Website: www.yoshioikezaki.net

Yoshio Ikezaki (池崎 義男, born January 12, 1953) is a Japanese artist, lecturer, professor, and a master of both washi paper making and sumi-e ink-wash painting. He lives in the United States.

== Early life and education ==
Ikezaki was born in Kitakyushu, Japan. He received his BA and Master of Fine Arts from Florida State University, concentrating in painting. To further advance his studies in traditional paper-making and ink painting, Ikezaki studied under master washi papermakers in Fukuoka, Japan.

== Work ==
Ikezaki is a washi paper maker who uses the paper he creates for his works of art. To capture the forces of nature he creates his composition using chi energies. For his sculptures, Ikezaki is known to layer washi paper to create forms by hand.

He won the Los Angeles Artcore 14th Annual Award in 2002 and the Holland Paper Biennial Artist Award in 2004.

In 2017 he was a winner in the UCDA Design Competition, Exhibition Catalog Art Center College of Design.

His work has been exhibited in LACMA, Takashimaya, USC Pacific Asia Museum, Art Center College of Design and is also part of the permanent collection of the American Craft Museum. Ikezaki has exhibited his work in museums and galleries in the USA, Germany, France, Holland, Belgium, Bulgaria, Lithuania, Japan, Korea, and Thailand.

He has taught as a professor at Art Center College of Design, Southern California Institute of Architecture, and as a visiting professor at Musashino Art University, Tama Art University, and has also lectured at Pratt Institute, Parsons School of Design, Cooper Union, and Rhode Island School of Design.

=== Reception ===
Ikezaki's work has been reviewed in the Los Angeles Times, Artforum magazine, and Tricycle: The Buddhist Review, among other publications.
