= Ihor Shkiria =

Ukrainian politician and businessman (born 1965)

- Ігор Шкіря
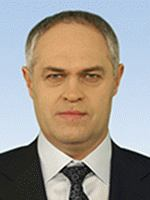
- A picture of him from 2014.

People's Deputy of Ukraine
- In office 27 November 2014 – 29 August 2019
- Constituency: Donetsk Oblast, No. 52
- In office 12 December 2012 – 27 November 2014
- Constituency: Donetsk Oblast, No. 52
- In office 23 November 2007 – 12 December 2012
- Constituency: Party of Regions, No. 157
- In office 25 May 2006 – 223 November 2007
- Constituency: Party of Regions, No. 38
- In office 14 May 2002 – 25 May 2006
- Constituency: Donetsk Oblast, No. 57

Personal details
- Born: Ihor Nikolaevich Shkiria; 20 August 1965 (age 61) Novhorodske, Ukrainian SSR, Soviet Union (now New York, Ukraine)
- Party: For United Ukraine! (2002); Party of Regions (2002-2014); Revival (2015-2019)
- Education: Dzerzhinsk Mining College (1984); Donetsk National Technical University (1989); Donetsk National University (1995)

Ihor Nikolaevich Shkiria (Ukrainian: Ігор Миколайович Шкіря; born 20 August 1965) is a Ukrainian politician and businessman who served as a People's Deputy of Ukraine in the Verkhovna Rada from 2002 to 2019, mostly with the Party of Regions and then its successor Revival. As a businessman, he was the owner of the conglomerate "Ilitash", which owned a variety of enterprises across Ukraine, and had a monopoly on reinforced concrete plants.

== Early life ==
Shkiria was born on 20 August 1965 in the city of what was then Novhorodske (now New York), which was part of the Ukrainian SSR in the Soviet Union at the time of his birth. After graduating from secondary school, he started attending the Dzerzhinsk Mining College, where he graduated in 1984 with a specialisation as a mining technician and electromechanic. While attending school, he received training at Secondary School No. 17, which was also in Dzerzhinsk (now known as Toretsk). Upon his graduation at the mining college, he briefly worked at and received more training as a fastener at the "Artem" mine in Dzerzhinsk. However, he quickly left this to do his mandatory military service in the Soviet Army in 1984, where he was stationed with the Group of Soviet Forces in Germany. After completing his service in 1986, he started attending the Donetsk Polytechnic Institute (now the Donetsk National Technical University) in 1986, which he graduated from in 1989 with a specialty in mining engineering and electromechanics. Upon his second graduation, he initially began to study at Donetsk National University full time, and then later part-time, and finally graduated in 1995 with a specialisation as a lawyer.

== Business career ==
Logo of First Business, a media company which he owns. It was later banned in 2023.

In 1990, Shkiria founded the company "Ilitash LLC", which initially began selling reinforced concrete structures, and which he said he founded together with a couple of classmates. According to Shkiria's own biography, he said he acquired capital for the company by selling Citizen calculators from Moscow to Donetsk. Throughout the 1990s and early 2000s, he began creating and buying out media companies, the first of which was the television and radio company "Zagrava" in 1996. He then created the online newspaper "URA-inform" in 2002. Later that year, he created the subsidiary travel company "Ilitas-Tour" also. In 2003, he obtained his first large enterprise, the Myronivskyi Plant of Reinforced Concrete Structures (ZHBK), which, although part of Bakhmut Raion is near Debaltseve, and of which he incorporated as part of "Beton-Nova". ZHBK made reinforced concrete poles for power lines, and also during his tenure there he began operating the company in the Russian market. Shkiria later sold it to the oligarch Rinat Akhmetov while Akhmetov was consolidating the power companies in the Donbas. After selling it off, in 2006, he then became the owner of the Donetsk Reinforced Concrete Plant, which he owned through the subsidiary "Central Stroy LLC". He later also bought out multiple other reinforced concrete plants across Ukraine, for which it said he would monopolize the market.

By at least 2006, he gained control of the Ukrainian Rating Agency and First Business. Shkiria also bought out "Don-InformCentre", an enterprise that owned a large office building in Donetsk at 7 Pavshikh Kommunarov Avenue, the following year. In 2004, Shkiria said he had started consolidating control of the media in the Donbas because of Viktor Yushchenko's ultimate victory in the 2004 Ukrainian presidential election, which Shkiria said was due to the active support of the media. He said he hoped to create a balanced situation to support Yanukovych by creating media companies.

In 2004-05, he began buying out and leasing large amounts of real estate in Crimea, mainly for the resorts of members of the Party of Regions. It also allegedly included the Marat sanatorium in Gaspra near Yalta, where Swallow's Nest is located, which consisted of over 15 hectares of land. This buyout also included land near Mount Ai-Petri, where some owners accused him of forcibly trying to take away property, and that he extensively boasted about his friendship with Yanukovych and power if they did not comply. However, a lawyer for the company later said that Shkiria was no longer involved in the company in 2007, and that the directorship had been transferred to Sergei Schukin after he had become a people's deputy. He also later owned UkrBus, which began bankruptcy proceedings in July 2012 in the Economic Court of Kyiv.

=== Other activities ===
From 1997 to 2000, he was vice-president of the basketball club "Shakhtar". In 2010, he was also appointed Honorary Chairman of the Council for Tourism and Resorts of Ukraine and President of the All-Ukrainian Association "Ukrbeton". He also became president of the All-Ukrainian Association of Road Carriers after its previous president, Vitaly Reva, resigned due to health reasons in late 2011.

== Political career ==
=== 2000s ===
Shkiria as a young deputy in 2002, during his first session in the Verkhovna Rada.

In 1997, Shkiria first entered politics when he was elected a deputy of the Donetsk City Council, although he was only on it for a year, until 1998, when he voluntarily gave up his mandate for the upcoming national elections. Thus, he ran in the 1998 Ukrainian parliamentary elections with the Razom Bloc (LPU and PP), and was placed initially on the party list then later he attempted to enter through constitutency No. 57. However, he was ultimately not selected, as Mykola Kravchenko won. After the 3rd convocation ended in 2002, Shkiria immediately ran for election again, this time with For United Ukraine!, although in the same constituency (No. 57, Donetsk Oblast). He was successfully elected this time with 45.71% of the vote against 16 other candidates. Upon joining the faction, he was initially a member of For United Ukraine! before joining the Party of Regions in 2005. He was also a member of the Committee on Construction, Transport, and Housing during this convocation. Shkiria became more influential and heavily outspoken after the start of the Orange Revolution. During this time and afterward, he frequently attacked the First Tymoshenko government and the then-President, Viktor Yushchenko. He accused the Orange Revolution of also being caused by the "globalists of the world", and that in the future, if Yanukovych were to become president, both Leonid Kuchma, Tymoshenko, and Yushchenko would be serving presidential sentences. In later interviews in 2005, he also said that the opposition government had "an aggressive attitude towards the resident of the Donbas", and that the government was creating a large number of lies about eastern Ukraine, and he also said that federalism should be treated more positively in Ukraine and not be associated with separatism.

During the 2006 Ukrainian parliamentary elections, Shkiria confirmed he would run for re-election, but this time with the party list of the Party of Regions. He was placed at No. 38 on the list. He was thus re-elected to the next convocation. Upon being re-elected, he joined the Party of Regions faction and was appointed Deputy Chairman of the Committee on Transport and Communications. In June 2006, he said he believed that the "orange coalition" would be broken. As a representative of the party, he also confirmed a month later that the Party of Regions was in negotiations to join the "anti-crisis coalition". The 2006 convocation would ultimately end early, though, leading to him re-running on the party list for the snap 2007 Ukrainian parliamentary elections, where he was placed much lower at No. 157, having apparently lower power. He rejoined the Party of Regions faction, but was demoted back down to being just a member of the Committee on Transport and Communications.

=== Early 2010s ===
During the 6th convocation, Shkiria gained notoriety again due to his power struggle and fight with multiple mayors, most notably the Mayor of Horlivka, Yevhen Klep, over the newly created constituency No. 52 and them not being a member of the Party of Regions. The fights started in March 2011, when Shkiria called the then Mayor of Debaltseve, Volodymyr Protsenko, a member of the Communist Party of Ukraine (CPU), a stranger who did not make contact with his district and promised that he would be removed. He then started attack Kelp, who was then a member of Strong Ukraine. Due to this, even some local members of the Party of Regions from Horlivka, like Larysa Alekseeva and Nadezhda Opalyuk, accused Skhiria of purposely provoking local showdowns. During the struggle, in April 2012, Mykola Azarov, the then Prime Minister of Ukraine, appointed Shkiria a voluntary advisor on transport infrastructure. After the elections were finally registered, constituency No. 52 included both Debaltseve and Toretsk, alongside the Bakhmut Raion and the Kalininskyi district of Horlivka. He ran with the Party of Regions again and was elected in a landslide with 60.74% of the vote (51,609 people) against the self-nominated candidate Volodymyr Poddubnyi (13.47%) and the CPU candidate Volodymyr Protsenko (12.25%). Upon rejoining the Rada, he became a member of the Party of Regions faction, and was promoted back to Chair of the Subcommittee on Road Transport of the Committee on Transport and Communications. He also became acting chairman of the Horlivka branch of the Party of Regions in February 2013.

In March 2013, several deputies of the Horlivka City Council appealed to the Party of Regions, calling Shkiria's actions "political raiding and seizing executive power", and said that they were being threatened by him if they did not align with his policies. This came after he and Klep's fight extended to the fracturing of the Horlivka City Council between those who supported him and those who supported Klep, which led the party to say they would negotiate or forcibly remove Klep later that month. The following year, Klep said that the village council and housing offices of Golma in Horlivka had been hit by an arson attack, when he accused an organised group of Skhiria of being behind. Skhiria, in response, called the statements "complete nonsense".

=== Euromaidan, War in the Donbas, and Marat scandal ===
In February 2014, after Euromaidan protests reached their peak, Skhiria, during a public meeting with the then Mayor of Toretsk, Volodymyr Sliptsov, expressed his disapproval of the protests. He said that, like the Orange Revolution, his belief was that the revolution was an "overseas scenario", and now domestically created to support European integration but created by opposition leaders to get support from abroad. However, he said it was evident that, with thousands of people coming to Euromaidan, there were serious problems in the country, but he said that Azarov was willing to rotate the Cabinet of Ministers and other government officials, but that the leaders of the Maidan had rejected this for more demands. In late 2014, Ukrainska Pravda accused him of being aware of the people in Toretsk who had sided with the pro-Russian, separatist Donetsk People's Republic (DPR) and of turning a blind eye to the organisation of the 2014 Donbas status referendums.

On 23 December 2016, during a session of the Toretsk City Council, Shkiria had red paint thrown at him by the head of the public council at the Donetsk Oblast State Administration, Iryna Kirikova. She said the paint symbolised "the blood of those who died in the Donbas", for which she accused him of being responsible and of inciting. After this, a brawl broke out between what were allegedly Shkiria's bodyguards and local activists, which broke the nose of one of the activists. Two years later, in 2018, it was widely circulated that Shkiria had retained the property of Marat in Gaspra, Crimea, which had been under Russian control since the 2014 Russian annexation of Crimea. It was said that in 2016 he concluded more contracts with the de facto Russian authorities to regularly hold events and host high authorities. It was also said that he hosted combat veterans of the Russian Union of Veterans of Afghanistan (RSVA), which was alleged to have recruited volunteers in the War in the Donbas and took part in the annexation of Crimea, who were allowed to go to Marat and receive rehabilitation at a much lower price. In fact, it was also said he visited Marat regularly despite its Russian status, together with his son.

=== Late career ===
In late 2014, despite the war, Shkiria announced his intentions to run again in constituency No. 52 for the snap 2014 Ukrainian parliamentary elections. Due to the war, only the city of Toretsk, its seat, and parts of Bakhmut Raion were under government control. Both the Kalininskyi district of Horlivka and Debaltseve, meanwhile, remained under DPR control at the time of the elections. He was easily re-elected as a self-nominated candidate, though, with 41.71% of the vote (4,778 people) against the other self-nominated candidate, Oleg Zhebyskyi, who got 19.46%. Upon joining the new 8th convocation, he became a member of the independent group "Economic Development", before eventually joining the pro-Russian Revival in March 2015. He was also appointed a member of the Committee on Transport. His last term in parliament would pass by mostly uneventfully, except for accusations in 2014 by Serhiy Taruta that Shkiria had "ordered" the militant Igor Bezler in Horlivka to target and kidnap Klep on accusations that he was stealing city funds. Shkiria did not run in the following 2019 Ukrainian parliamentary elections, marking the end of his political career.

== Personal life ==
He is married to Inna Ivanovoa, who was born in 1965. His wife, in 2018, completed her bar exam for the qualification of lawyer and counsel in the Transcarpathian Oblast, with her address being listed in Mukachevo at the time. They have one son, Dmitri/Dmytro, who was born in 1988. His son Dmitri was severely beaten in 2008, which required surgery at the Donetsk Regional Hospital named after Kalinin. It was said he was attacked from behind and hit in the head, then pierced with either a knife or brass knuckles, which caused a hematoma to develop. At the time, it was confirmed that Dmitri was planning to enter the University of Kyiv as an economist. Later, Dmitri was eventually made a co-founder and owner of Ilitash, and also later became a deputy in the Toretsk City Council, at least before 2014.

After the 2022 Russian invasion of Ukraine, it was reported that he and his son had fled Ukraine, although it is unknown where he went, and thus it has never been officially confirmed.

== Honours and awards ==
Shkiria has been awarded the following honours and awards:

- Order of Merit, III degree (2004)
- Order of Merit, II degree (2011)
