= Grace Nicholson =

American art collector and dealer

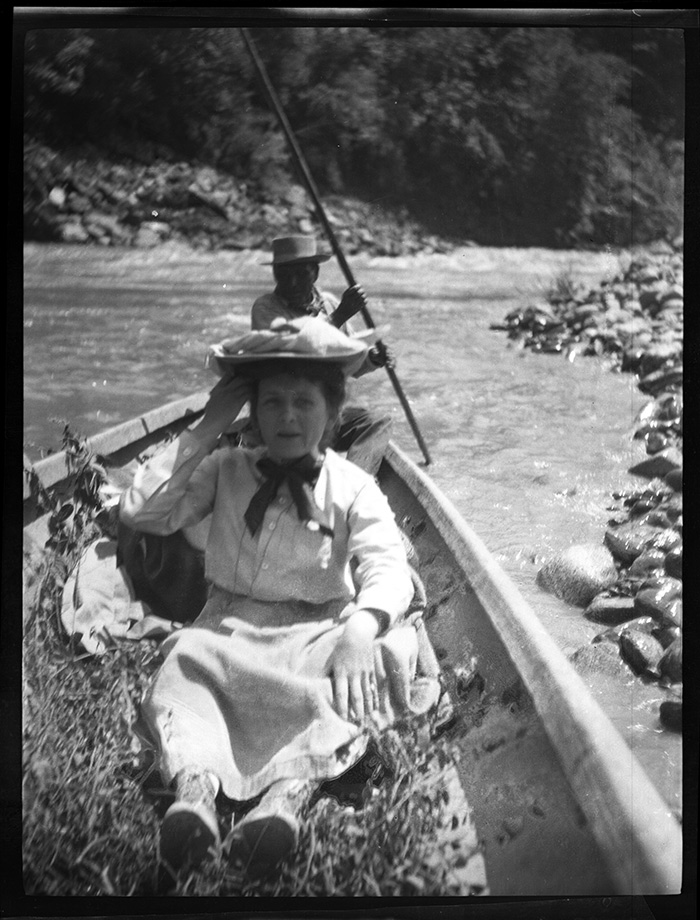
“Canoe & occupants, en route, Trinity,” 1906. Grace Nicholson is in front.

Grace Nicholson (December 31, 1877 – August 31, 1948) was an American art collector and art dealer, specializing in Native American and Chinese handicrafts. The space she originally designed for her shop is now home to the USC Pacific Asia Museum in Pasadena, California.

== Early life and education ==
Grace Nicholson was born in Philadelphia, Pennsylvania, daughter of Franklin Nicholson and Rose Dennington Nicholson. Her father was an attorney, and her mother trained as an educator. Rose Nicholson died from complications following Grace's birth; when Grace was a teen, her father also died, and she was sent to live with her paternal grandparents. They both died in 1901, leaving her an inheritance.

Nicholson attended Philadelphia High School for Girls, graduating in the class of 1896. She briefly worked as a stenographer after high school.

== Career ==
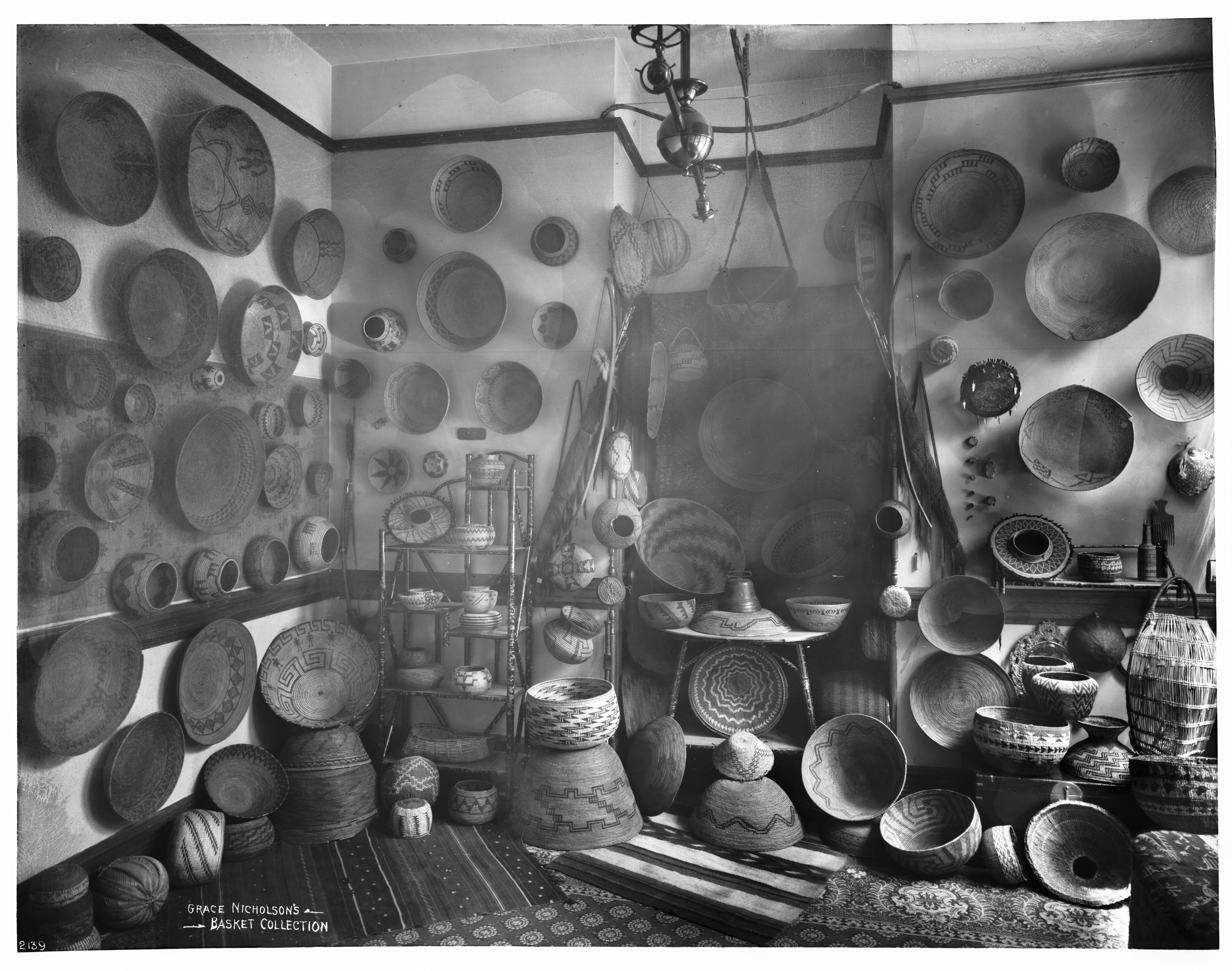
Indian basket collection of Miss Grace Nicholson, ca.1900 (CHS-2139)

In 1901, using her inheritance, Nicholson moved to California, and soon opened a small shop in Pasadena, selling Native American handicrafts such as baskets and weaving. She hired crafters to teach traditional beadwork and other skills; she rented space to local artists. She traveled extensively in the rural western and Southwestern United States, worked with local dealers to build her collection, and corresponded with East Coast collectors to sell the objects. She personally photographed and catalogued her holdings; she also built an extensive photographic record beyond the objects, especially of the Klamath River people, with whom she had frequent dealings. She developed longterm relationships with some favorite crafters, well beyond ordinary business dealings: she paid for eye surgery for one ailing basketmaker, and paid college tuition for another young woman.

Nicholson acquired artifacts for sale, but also for major museums such as the Smithsonian Institution and the Field Museum in Chicago. She lectured about "the Indian" to churches and civic groups. In recognition of her expertise, Nicholson was elected to the American Anthropological Association in 1904. As a member of the "Anthropological Society," she joined a tour group that visited horticulturist Luther Burbank in 1905, in Santa Rosa, California. In 1909, she was awarded a silver medal at the Alaska-Yukon-Pacific Exposition in Seattle, for a display of baskets and other artifacts.

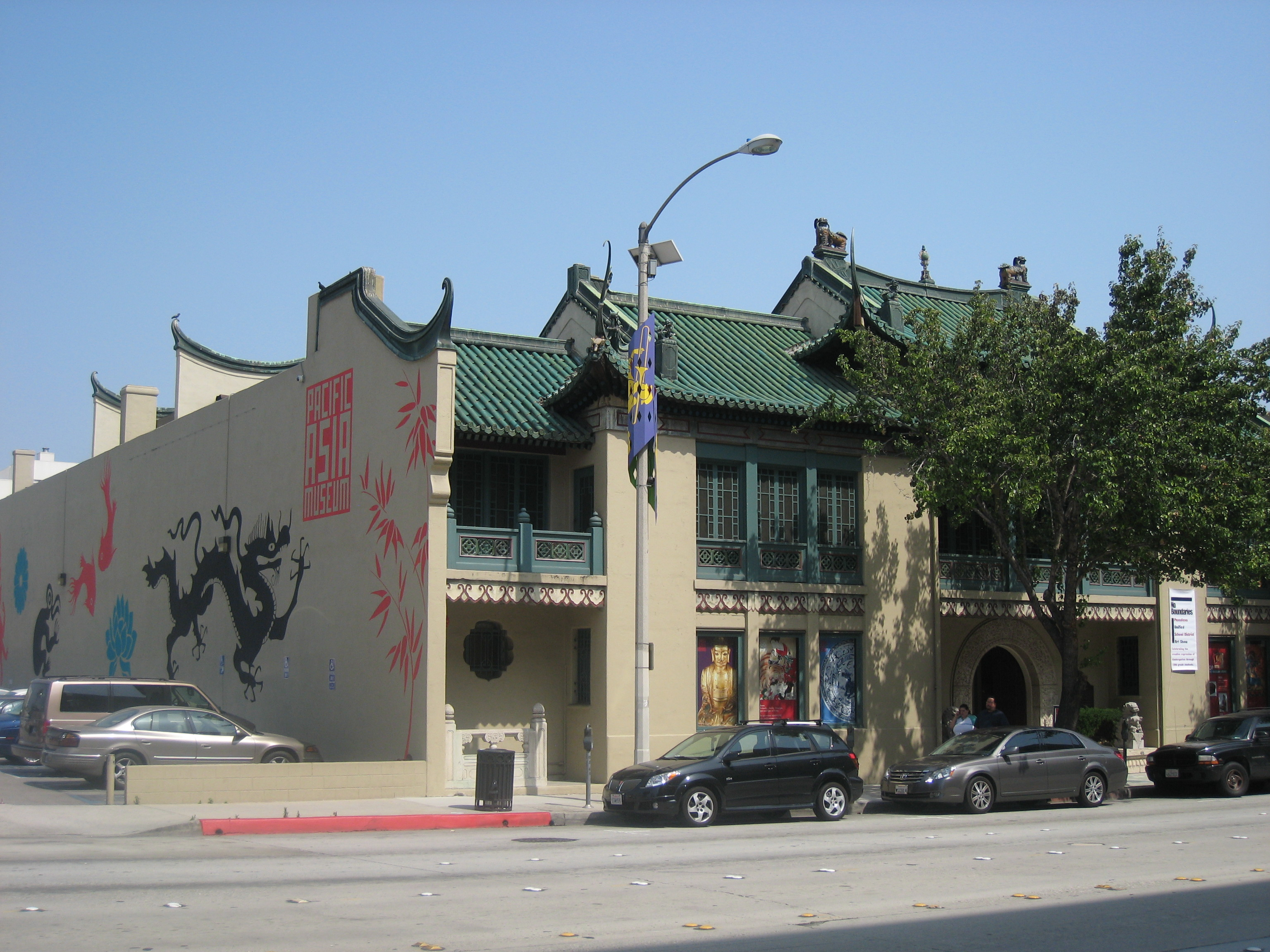
The Grace Nicholson Building in Pasadena, California, home of the USC Pacific Asia Museum

In 1924, she designed a new building for her collections, which (reflective of changing fashions) had begun to focus on Asian art. The architectural firm of Marston, Van Pelt & Maybury worked with Nicholson to realize her vision. Her design, nicknamed the "Treasure House," borrowed elements from buildings she had seen in China. The building was opened as an art gallery and shop in 1925, although the interior garden courtyard was not completed until 1929.

The Los Angeles Times regularly included Nicholson's gallery in listings of local art events. Notable artists whose work was presented under her supervision include Honolulu-based Frank Montague Moore, Southwestern painter Joseph Henry Sharp, Danish silversmith Georg Jensen, William Victor Higgins, watercolorist Pop Hart, Emil Fuchs, Dutch cartoonist Gustave Verbeek, Grace Hudson, Agnes Lawrence Pelton, undersea painter Zarh Pritchard, and Irish-born illustrator Power O'Malley. She hosted an especially eclectic display of European tapestries and Persian pottery in 1928.

Her building was deeded to the City of Pasadena in 1943, but she continued to live in her private apartment on the second floor until her death from cancer in 1948.

== Personal life ==
Nicholson was an active charter member of the Zonta Club of Pasadena, and hosted meetings at her home, including a 1929 Christmas party attended by Amelia Earhart.

== Legacy ==
Nicholson's papers and photographs were donated to the Huntington Library in 1968. Nicholson's 1925 building is now home to the USC Pacific Asia Museum. Much of her private collection of artifacts was incorporated into the holdings of the Smithsonian's National Museum of the American Indian. Another large collection of items purchased from Nicholson was bequeathed to the Montclair Art Museum in New Jersey, by Florence Rand Osgood Lang.

A Grace Nicholson scholarship for women students who demonstrate artistic talent was established at Scripps College in 1951.

In 2010, over two hundred sacred and ceremonial items collected by Nicholson and purchased from her by George Gustav Heye were repatriated to the Yurok people, one of the largest repatriations in the history of the National Museum of the American Indian.
