= Zarh Pritchard =

British-American artist

Walter Howlison Mackenzie Pritchard
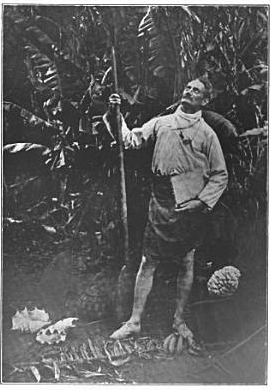
- Born: March 26, 1866; Madras, British India
- Died: August 29, 1956 (aged 90); Austin, Texas, U.S.
- Known for: Underwater painting

Walter Howlison Mackenzie "Zarh" Pritchard (26 March 1866 – 29 August 1956) was a British-American artist, known for painting underwater landscapes while underwater, using a diving suit and waterproof materials.

== Early life and education ==
Walter Howlison Mackenzie Pritchard was born in Madras, India, to British and Irish parents. As a schoolboy in Scotland he read Twenty Thousand Leagues Under the Seas by Jules Verne, and later stated it was an influence on his underwater pursuits. Before becoming an artist, he briefly studied medicine, and worked in London, where he designed a sea-themed costume for Sarah Bernhardt.

== Career ==
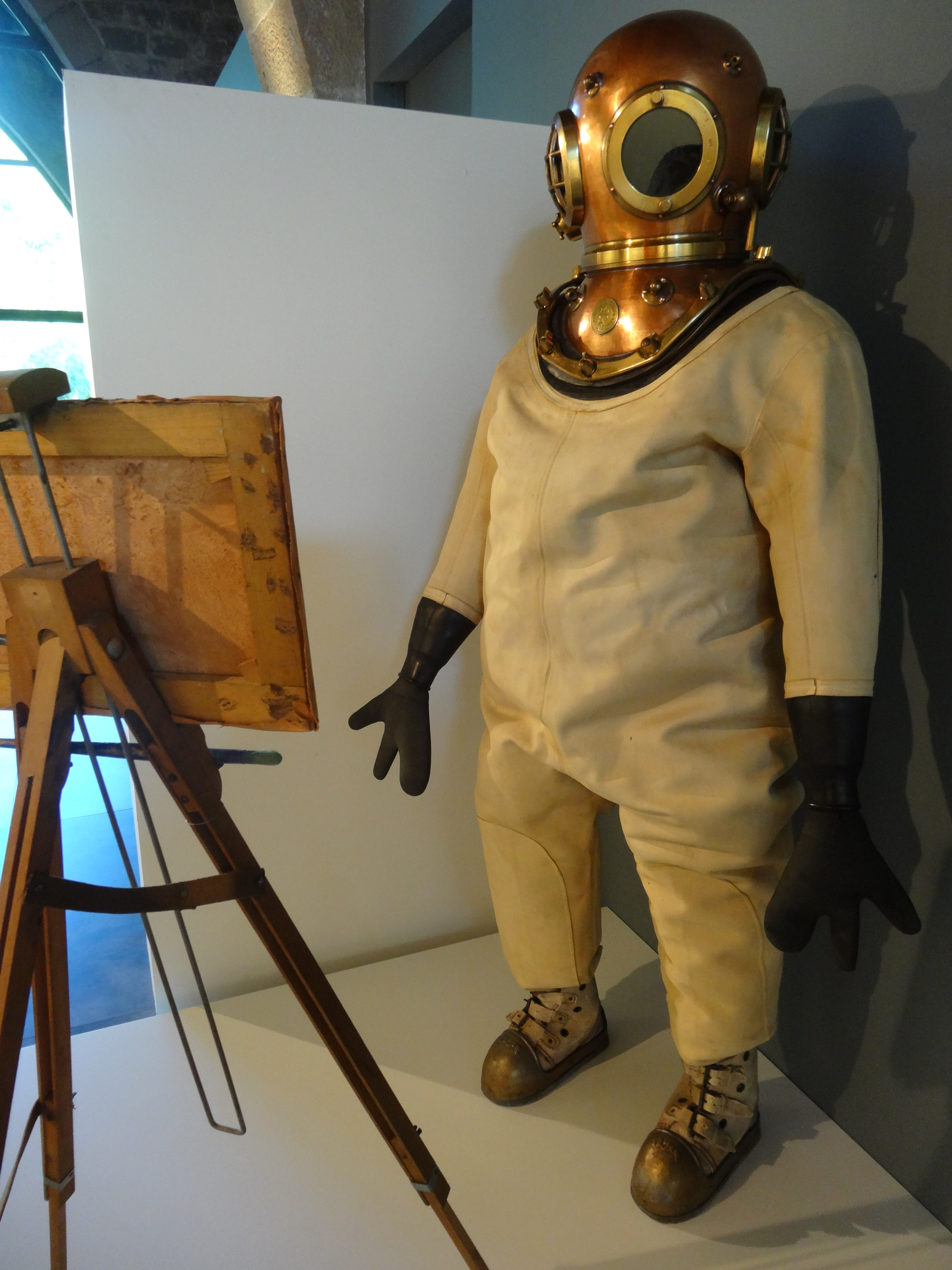
Classic diving suit of the 19th century, similar to that used by Zahr Pritchard.

Pritchard used modified diving gear to paint underwater, setting up an easel at depths up to fifty feet, and using oil crayons and canvases specially treated to work in that environment. Pritchard traveled the world looking for new underwater scenes, with trips to Bermuda, Tahiti, the Philippines, Santa Barbara, Brazil, and several locations in the Mediterranean Sea. He described the colors underwater as extraordinarily intense, "so bright you step back from them", and the fish as "inquisitive". In another interview, Pritchard mentioned ideas for further novelty: he hoped someday to rig underwater electric lighting for "the most interesting effects". Art critic and longtime admirer Antony Anderson of the Los Angeles Times found his work "remarkable", and declared that "Truly, he is one artist among many thousands when it comes to imagination and inventiveness". Pritchard himself rejected the label of "artist", saying "I am not an artist at all, I am a naturalist who happens to be a painter."

In his lifetime, Pritchard's works were displayed both as art and as natural science documents, notably at the Galerie Georges Petit in Paris, at the Cleveland Museum of Natural History, at the American Museum of Natural History in New York City, and in Pasadena at the Grace Nicholson gallery. Among other collectors, Albert I, Prince of Monaco and Sir Joseph Duveen purchased works from Pritchard. Another admirer, naturalist William Beebe, said, "My ideal room would be one with several paintings of Mr. Pritchard's on each wall."

== Personal life ==
Pritchard bought a home near Bishop, California in 1914, but abandoned it sometime in the 1930s, and refused to pay taxes for the property; it burned down in 1942.

Pritchard died in Austin, Texas in 1956, age 90.

== Legacy ==
Pritchard's "Bream in 25 Feet of Water Off the West Coast of Scotland" (1910) is in the collection of the Brooklyn Museum. His "Sunset on Granite Crags, Near Bishop Creek" is in the collection of the Museum of Fine Arts, Boston. Three of Pritchard's paintings were part of a marine-themed exhibition at the Charles H. Scott Gallery in Vancouver, British Columbia in 2012.
