= Raisa Azarh =

Russian physician (1897–1971)

Raḯsa Mojséïvna Azárh
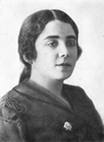
- Born: 2 May 1897; Shcherbinovka, Yekaterinoslav Governorate, Russia
- Died: 9 November 1971 (aged 74); Moscow
- Burial place: Novodevichy Cemetery
- Education: Institute of Red Professors
- Occupations: Physician, author
- Organization: USSR Union of Writers
- Political party: Communist Party of the Soviet Union
- Awards: Order of the Red Banner; Order of the Red Star; Order of Lenin

Raḯsa Mojséïvna Azárh or Raisa Moyseyevna Azarkh (2 May 1897 – 9 November 1971) was a distinguished physician of the Soviet Union, and also an author, essayist and biographer.

She took part in the October Revolution and the Russian Civil War. She alternated as the medical supervisor and a political commissar on the Far Eastern, Ukrainian and Volga Fronts in the period 1918–20. She was responsible for organizing field and hospital facilities in Vyatka, Kyiv, Omsk and Krasnoyarsk. As the Vyatka Special Division commissar, she headed the fight against the Whites in the Kama Valley in 1918.

Azarkh was then sent to Ukraine in December 1918. While she performed her medical duties from a rail wagon, she also saw action against the armies of the Ukrainian People's Republic, Nykyfor Hryhoriv and Anton Denikin. She moved again in July 1919 to Siberia and the Far East, where she stayed until the autumn of 1920.

Azarkh served as military commissar of the 1st Special Vyatka Division, head of the Military Medical Administration of Ukraine, head of Medical Service in the 5th Army, and head of the Medical Administration of the Far Eastern Republic. In recognition of her service, she was awarded the Order of the Red Banner and later on the Order of Lenin.

Azarkh later volunteered as part of the International Brigades in the Spanish Civil War in 1936, organizing the Spanish Republican Army's medical corps alongside Dr. Norman Bethune. She received the Order of the Red Star in 1937. She wrote about her experiences in the Russian and Spanish civil wars in a memoir called Doroga Chesti ("The Path of Honour").

Azarkh also saw action in Finland in 1940 and later on the southwestern front during the Second World War.

Azarkh was born in Yekaterinoslav, in the town then known as Shcherbinovka (now Toretsk in Ukraine), and studied at the Institute of Red Professors. She died in Moscow.

== Bibliography ==
- Borba prodolzhaetsia: povest (The Struggle Continues: A Narrative, 1937)
- Doroga Chesti (The Path of Honour, 1959)
- U velikikh istokov (At the Great Beginning, publisher Voenizdat, 1967)
