= Toretsk =

City in Donetsk Oblast, Ukraine

Toretsk Торецьк
- City
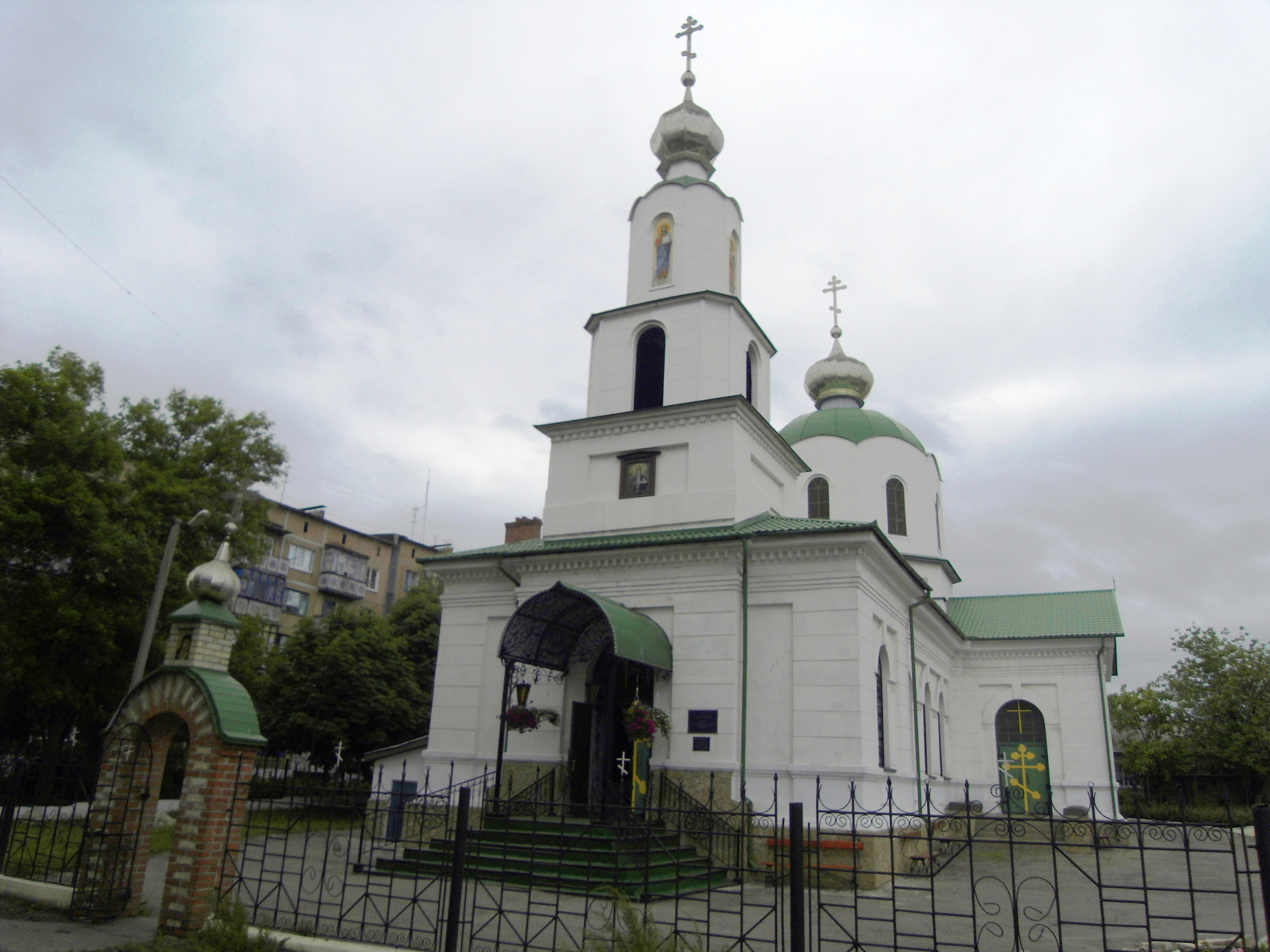
- Church of St. Macarius in Toretsk

- Flag Coat of arms
- Interactive map of Toretsk
- Location within Donetsk Oblast Location within Ukraine
- Coordinates: 48°23′30″N 37°52′24″E
- Country: Ukraine
- Oblast: Donetsk Oblast
- Raion: Bakhmut Raion
- Hromada: Toretsk urban hromada
- Founded: 1806
- City rights: 1938
- Microdistrict/Microraion: Fomiha Microraion; Krymske Microraion; Nakhalivka Microraion; Zabalka Microraion

Government
  - Head: Vasil Chynchyk

Area
  - Total: 62 km^{2} (24 sq mi)
- Elevation: 179 m (587 ft)

Population (2022)
  - Total: 30,914
  - Density: 500/km^{2} (1,300/sq mi)
- Postal code: 85200—85279
- Area code: +380-6247
- Climate: Dfb
- Website: http://toretsk-rada.gov.ua/

Toretsk (Ukrainian: Торецьк; Russian: Торецк) is an industrial city in Bakhmut Raion, Donetsk Oblast, eastern Ukraine. It serves as the administrative center of Toretsk urban hromada. As of January 2022, its population was approximately 30,914.

It has its origins as the hamlet Shcherbynivka, (Note: Ukrainian: Щербинівка; Russian: Щербиновка, romanized: Shcherbinovka.) built during the mid-19th century developments in coal mining in the Donbas region. It developed over the following century with the rise of rail transport. Between 1936–2016, the city was named Dzerzhynsk (Note: Ukrainian: Дзержинськ; Russian: Дзержинск, romanized: Dzerzhinsk.) after Felix Dzerzhinsky, the founder of the Soviet security service Cheka. The city received its current name in 2016, as a result of decommunization laws.

Toretsk has seen fighting and shelling during the War in Donbas, in the first phase of the Russo-Ukrainian War that began in 2014, which has depopulated and heavily damaged the infrastructure of the city over the years. After the year-long Battle of Toretsk during the Russian invasion of Ukraine, Russia captured the city in August 2025. Due to the fighting, the city was ruined and virtually entirely depopulated. Russia calls Toretsk by its pre-2016 name Dzerzhinsk (Note: According to Russian transliteration) and considers it to be part of the Donetsk People's Republic, which it claims to have annexed.

== Geography ==
Toretsk is located on the right bank of the Kryvyi Torets river, which is a tributary of the Kazennyi Torets. It is located in the historical, cultural, and economic Donbas region within eastern Ukraine.

By transport, it is between the railway stations of Fenolnaya about 7 km (urban settlement New York) on the Konstantinovka - Yasinovata line and Magdalinovka about 1 km (settlement Pivnichnoe) on the Konstantinovka - Nikitovka line.

== History ==
=== 18th Century ===
The territory where Toretsk now sits has been inhabited since ancient times, as discovered with archaeological findings. According to Donetsk local historian M. Kulishov, the site of the first documented coal mining in the Donbas is located in Toretsk, in Skelevataya Gully:

Skelevataya Gully in Toretsk (formerly Dzerzhinsk) is the site of the first documented coal mining in the Donbas. The discovery of coal in Skelevataya Gully is recorded in documents from the Mining Collegium as 1721. This year went down in history as the year the Donetsk Coal Basin was discovered. Here, 25 miles from Bakhmut, in the Skelevataya gully, under the leadership of the commandant of the Bakhmut fortress, Semyon Chirkov, and the manager of the salt mines, Nikita Vepreisky, coal was mined in 1722-1724 at the outcrops of coal seams on the daylight surface.

=== 19th Century ===
The settlement of Zaitsevo emerged near the Sukhoi and Zhitny Yar ravines. By 1800, part of the settlement's population had moved to the Shcherbinovsky farmstead. The city itself was founded in 1806 in the Russian Empire, when parts of the town Zaitseve were split off into several minor hamlets, including Shcherbynivskyi. According to local traditions, this name originates from a similarly-named Cossack outpost in the area. In the late 1830s, coal deposits were discovered in the area, and the area was developed for coal mining. Shcherbynivskyi and neighboring villages were united into a village named Shcherbynivka, which became part of Bakhmut uezd.

By the mid-19th century, Shcherbinovka's population reached 457. Coal mining developed. In 1869, the Kursk-Kharkiv-Azov Railway was built, which passed near Shcherbynivka, significantly contributing to the economic development of the town. In the early 1890s, a coke plant was built. On the eve of 1916, three coal mines and two industrial enterprises were operating in Shcherbinovka.

=== 20th century ===
Shcherbynivka changed hands several times during the Russian Civil War of 1917–1923, before eventually being captured by the Bolsheviks, who established the communist Soviet Union on much of the former territory of the Russian Empire. In late 1918, a machine-gun crew was formed from among the Shcherbinov Red Guards for the 2nd Simbirsk Armored Train, which distinguished itself during the Defense of Tsaritsyn (now Volgograd) against the forces of Anton Ivanovich Denikin.

In 1923, 1 million tons of coal were mined. A cultural center and park were built in the first post-revolutionary years. In 1931, the Central Mine was renamed the Dzerzhinsky Mine. During the Second Five-Year Plan, the Toretskugol Trust was formed, which included the following mines:

- Central (mine) Dzerzhinsky Mine
- Artem Mine
- Sergeev, Fyodor Andreevich Mine
- Severnaya (mine, Toretskugol) Severnaya Mine
- Chigari (Yuzhnaya) Mine
- Mine No. 1-1-bis (Toretskaya)
- Mine No. 11-12
- Shcherbinovskoye Mining Administration (several small mines).

In 1936, Shcherbynivka was renamed to Dzerzhynsk after Felix Dzerzhinsky. Dzerzhinsky was the founder of the Cheka secret police in the USSR, and architect of the Red Terror. It also received city status. A local newspaper began being published in the town in September 1936. Dzerzhinsk was removed from the Gorlovka District, and the Dzerzhinsky District was formed (with Shcherbinovka as its center). In 1937, the Dzerzhinskugol trust mined 9,000 tons of coal daily.

During Great Patriotic War, Dzerzhynsk was occupied by Nazi Germany from 22 October 1941 to 5 September 1943. During the occupation, the Germans killed 150 civilians and deported 1,460 for forced labor to Germany. The Germans operated a subcamp of the Stalag 378 prisoner-of-war camp in the town. On 5 September 1943, the city was liberated by Red Army troops of the Southern Front during the Donbass Operation. 51st Army consisted of: 315th Rifle Division (Major General Kuropatenko, Dmitry Semenovich), 63rd Rifle Corps (Major General Koshevoy, Pyotr Kirillovich).

On 30 December 1962, Dzerzhinsk received the status of a city of regional subordination. In 1970, the city's population was 47,000 people. Six coal mines, a coke plant, a phenol plant, an acid-proof products plant, an enrichment plant, the Dzerzhinsk Mining College, a medical school, a music school and others operated here. According to the 1989 Soviet census, Dzerzhynsk's population was 50,538 people.

=== After 1991 ===
In May 1995, the Cabinet of Ministers of Ukraine approved a decision to privatize the machine tool plant located in the city, ATP-11407, ATP-11478, central processing plant "Dzerzhinskaya", mechanical repair plant and acid-resistant plant products. In July 1995, the decision to privatize the bakery was approved. In October 1995 - the decision to privatize the housing and communal services department of the PA "Dzerzhinskugol".

=== 21st century ===
In the 2001 census, Dzerzhynsk's population was 43,371 and by 2013 had declined to 35,296 people.

Following the 2015 law on decommunization, the city council decided on 16 October 2015 to rename the city to Toretsk. The name was approved by the Verkhovna Rada (the Ukrainian parliament) on 4 February 2016.

In August 2016, Toretsk mayor Volodymyr Sleptsov was arrested on separatism charges due to his ties to the Donetsk People's Republic in 2014; Serhiy Vinnyk became acting mayor.

In 2020, Toretsk became the center of Toretsk urban hromada within Bakhmut Raion, in accordance with nationwide administrative reforms.

==== Russo-Ukrainian War ====
===== War in Donbas =====
Starting in mid-April 2014, during the beginning of the war in Donbas, Russia-backed paramilitaries captured several towns in Donetsk Oblast, including Dzerzhynsk. On 21 July, Ukrainian forces recaptured the city. As a result of the conflict, the city had its water supply cut multiple times during the war due to constant shelling by Russian-backed separatists, which prevented repairs as of November 2016.

===== Russian invasion of Ukraine =====
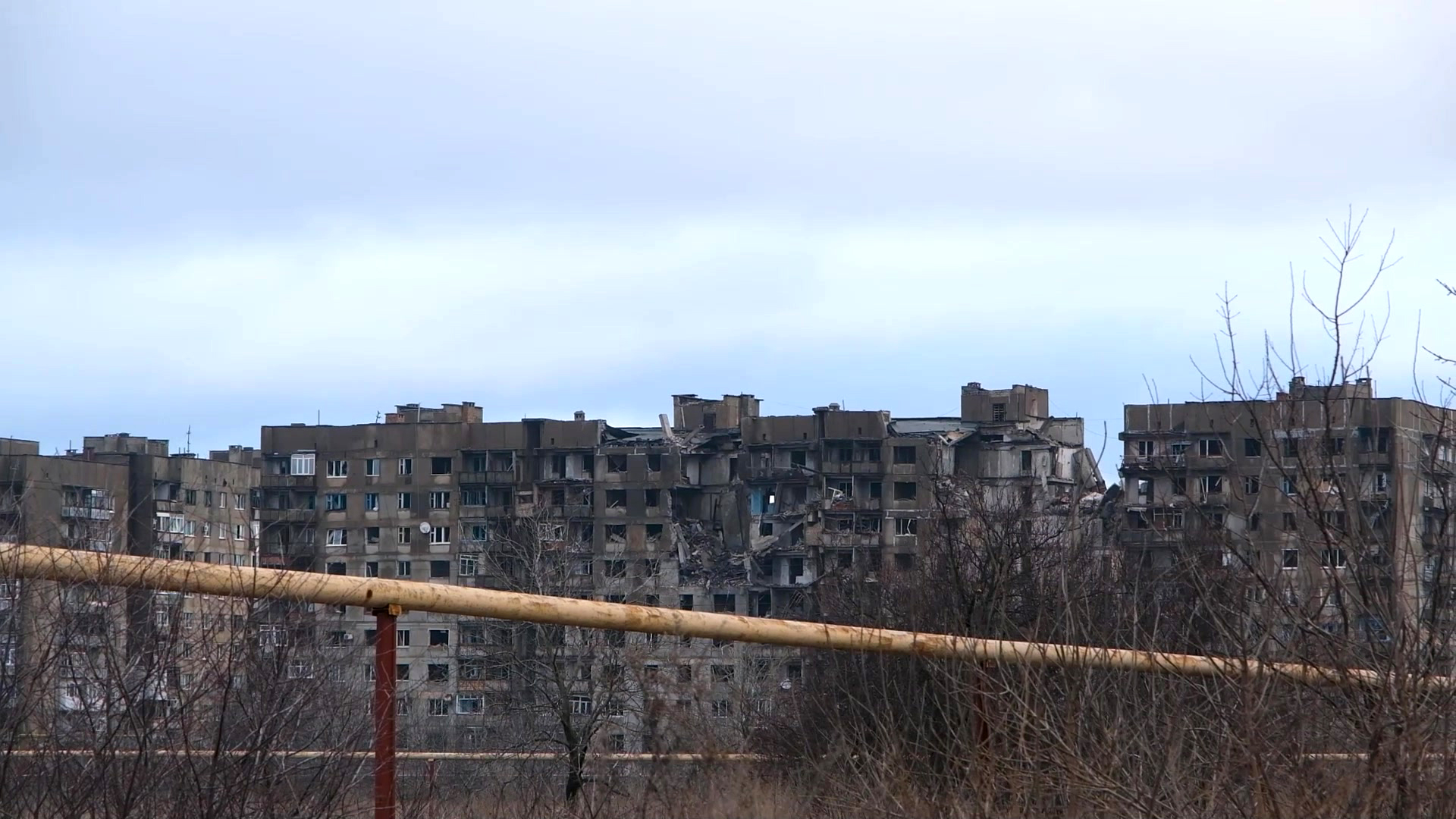
Buildings damaged by Russian shelling, October 2023

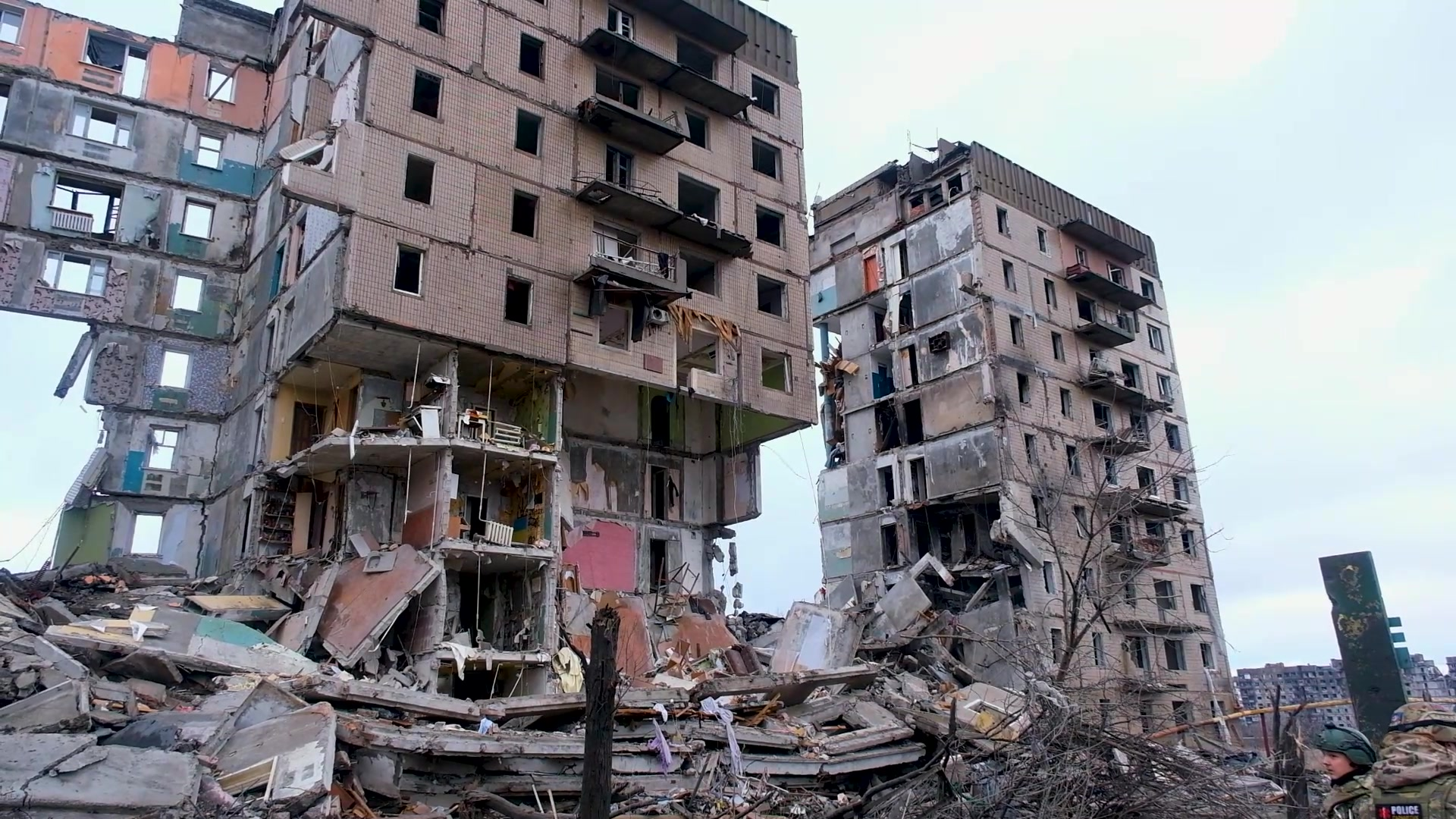
A residential building in Toretsk after Russian shelling in December 2023

Following the Russian invasion of Ukraine that began in February 2022, Russian forces advanced through Donetsk Oblast towards the city. Half of the pre-war population of 32,000 had fled the city by April 2022, and those that remained were impoverished and lacking in basic resources. Numerous civilians were killed as a result of Russian strikes. Toretsk civil-military administration head Vasyl Chynchyk announced in July 2023 that open-air markets in the city would be closed due to the extreme danger from Russian attacks. The administration continued slowly evacuating people westward. There had been no water or gas supply in a year and a half as of July 2023.

In June 2024, Toretsk came under increased Russian pressure, as part of a renewed campaign to capture the city and its surrounding villages. By October, Russia fully or almost completely controlled Toretsk's eastern outskirt settlements of Pivnichne, Zalizne, Druzhba, and Pivdenne, while also advancing into the center of Toretsk. By that time, Ukrainian military officials estimated the city population to have decreased to around 1,150. By January 2025, Russian forces controlled the urban area of Toretsk, with fighting ongoing around the city and its northern outskirts. Ukrainian forces indirectly admitted that most of the city was no longer controlled by Ukraine. On 7 February, Russia claimed that the city had been fully captured by its forces, although this was denied by Ukraine. The city was confirmed to have been captured by Russia in early August 2025.

== Demographics ==
Population history
Year	Pop.	±%
1926	18,886	—
1989	50,538	+167.6%
2001	43,371	−14.2%
2013	35,296	−18.6%
2022	30,914	−12.4%
2024	1,150	−96.3%

As of the 2001 Ukrainian census, the majority of residents identified as ethnic Ukrainians and spoke Russian as their first language:

The city became practically entirely depopulated as result of the Russian bombardment and months-long assault on the city. Amid heavy fighting, the city population decreased to about 1,150 according to a statement by the Ukrainian military administration on 11 October 2024, down from the estimated 1,600 by 13 September following an organised evacuation of at least 8,000. The estimated number of residents further decreased to 126 by January 2025, to 48 by March, and to around 40 by April.

Ethnicity

- Ukrainians: 61.4%
- Russians: 36.1%
- Belarusians: 1%
- Tatars: 0.3%
- Romani: 0.3%

First language

- Russian: 87.1%
- Ukrainian: 12.2%
- Romani: 0.2%
- Belarusian: 0.1%
- Armenian: 0.1%

== Economy ==
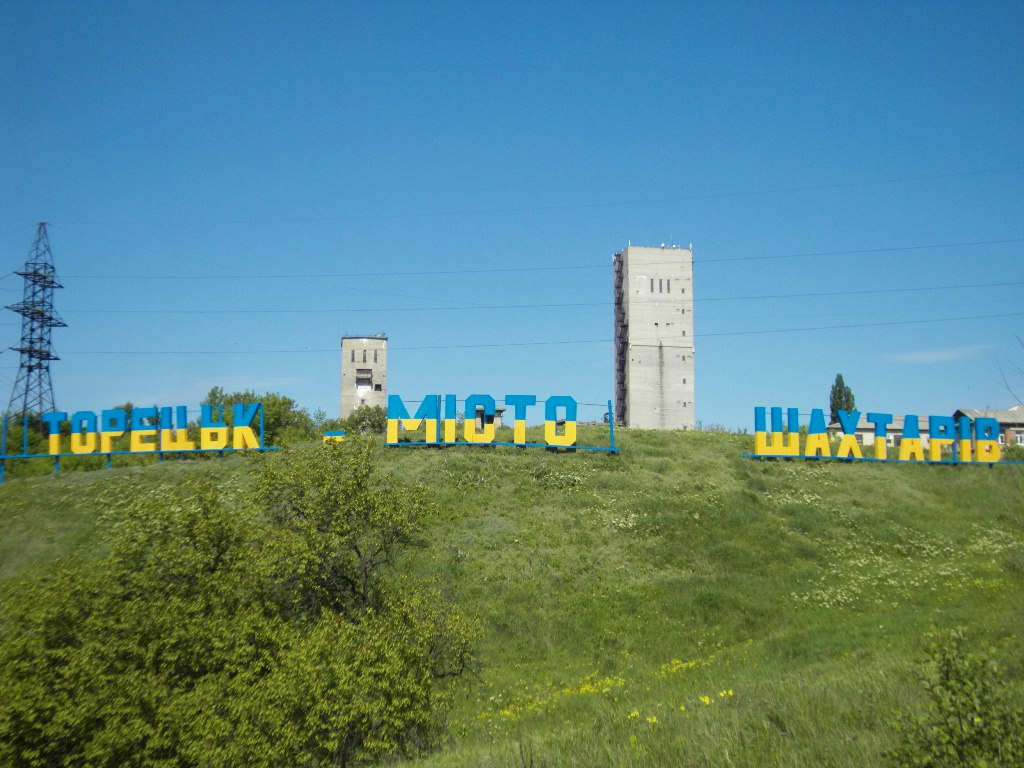
A large sign reading "Toretsk is a town of miners"

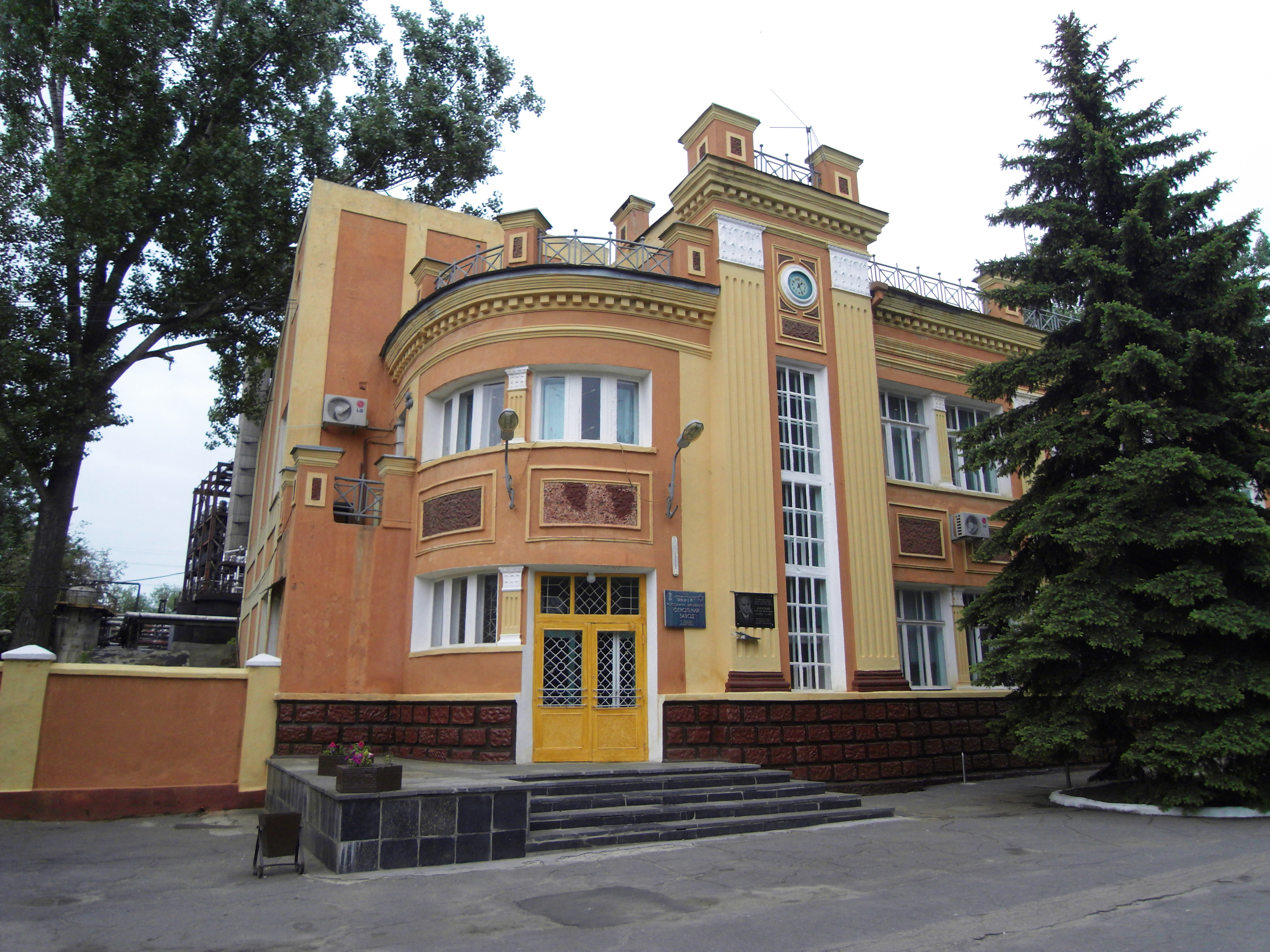
Toretsk phenol plant.

The industries of the city (until the 2010s) included coal mining, the production of coke chemical, ceramics, and phenol.

Coal industry (GKH "Toretskugol, Mine named after St. Matrona of Moscow") - coal production in 2003 - 854 thousand tons, chemical (Dzerzhinsky phenol plant - urban-type settlement of Novgorodskoye, produces naphthalene, phenols, and other products from waste coke and chemical production; coke plant; acid-resistant products plant) industry, mechanical engineering (PO "Metallist", Novgorod Machine-Building Plant - mining machines, machine tool assembly plant, OJSC "Galeya" - a monopoly supplier of high-voltage cable products for wind power stations in Ukraine).

Coal mining is carried out in challenging geological conditions, with the depth of extraction constantly increasing, 80% using jackhammers.

Dzerzhinsky Instrument-Making Plant, LLC, was established on the premises of the former branch of the Poltava defense enterprise located in the city. It produces unique high-precision instruments, including liquid flow meters, navigation equipment, and optical equipment.

Two newspapers are published in the city: "Dzerzhinsky Shakhtyor" (Dzerzhinsky Shakhtyor), which has been published since 1936, and "Dzerzhinsky Uyezd." The city also has its own television channel, "TRK-8."

== Transport ==
Before the war, the city had its own public transport Gorelektrotransport and trolleybus lines. The number of routes increased from two in 1985 to three in 1991, and to four since 1994.

1. Depot (Shakhterov Avenue) — Zheleznoye (city) (Artyom Mine)
2. Depot (Shakhterov Avenue) — Toretskaya Mine
3. Bus Station — Toretskaya Mine

In September 2007, the last trolleybuses between the depot and the neighborhood were removed, after which the trolleybus administration was liquidated. Trolleybuses were replaced by minibuses, and since the end of 2007, 11 new Ruslan (Dong Feng) buses have arrived at the trolleybus depot.

== Education ==
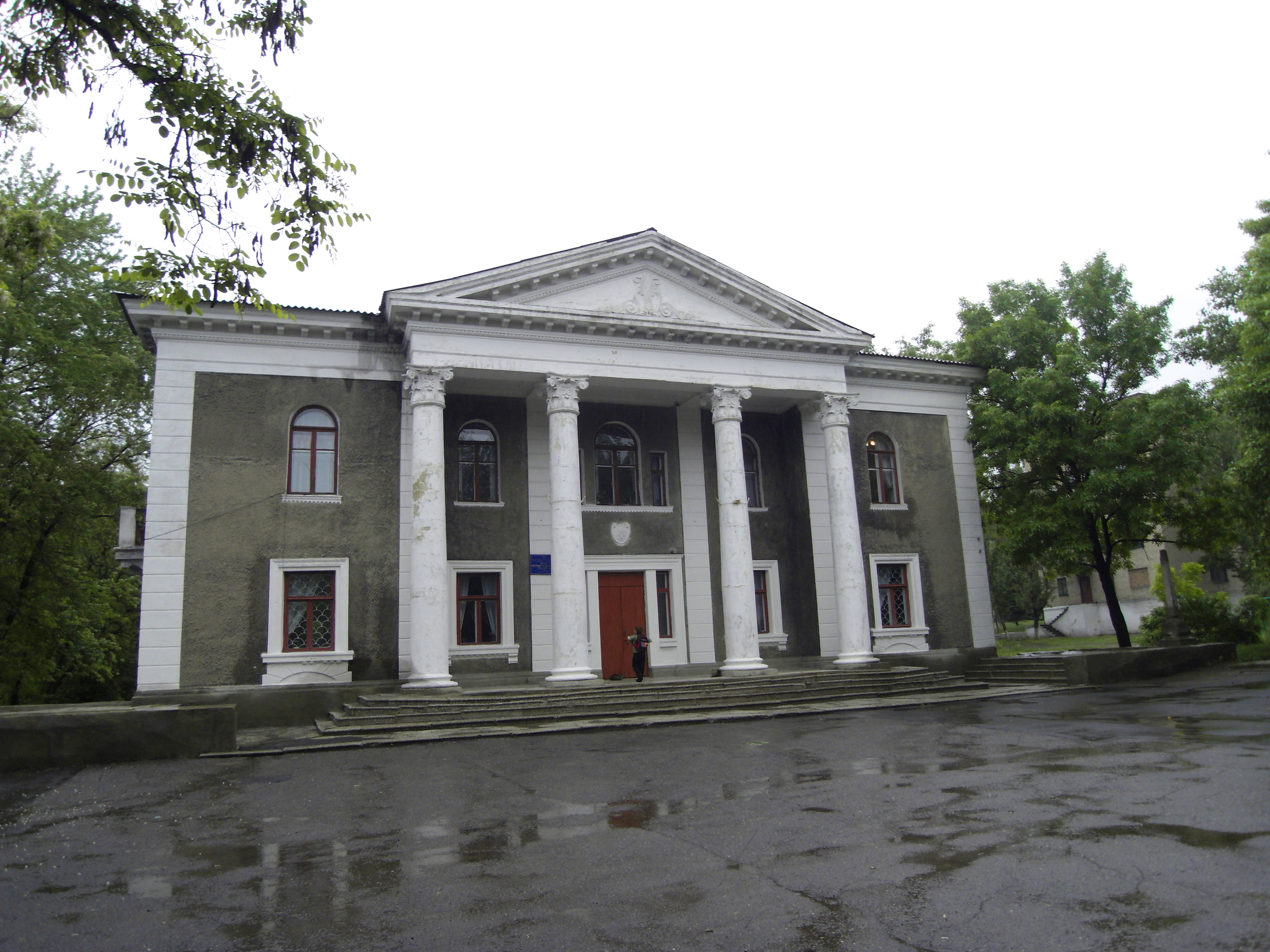
Children's and Youth Creativity Center.

General secondary education in the city is subordinated to the City Department of Education of the Toretsk City Council of the Donetsk Region. There are three educational and upbringing complexes: school-gymnasium (former secondary school No. 1), school-kindergarten No. 1 (former secondary school No. 18) and school-lyceum (former secondary school No. 6), as well as specialized comprehensive school of levels 1-3 of education No. 3 with in-depth study of the English language, 8 comprehensive schools of levels 1-3 of education; 7 schools of levels 1-2 of education; a comprehensive boarding school of levels 1-3, an evening comprehensive school of levels 2-3 of education. In the 2009-2010 academic year, 5,200 children were enrolled in 21 schools in the city, while in 1981-1982, more than 10,000 students were enrolled in 24 schools.

Vocational education in the city is represented by the following educational institutions: Donbass State College of Technology and Management, Toretsk Music College, Mining Lyceum (former School No. 89), and Vocational and Technical Lyceum (former School No. 73). The Toretsk Young Technicians' Station, the Children's and Youth Creativity Center, and the Children's and Youth Sports School are also active.

== Social sphere ==
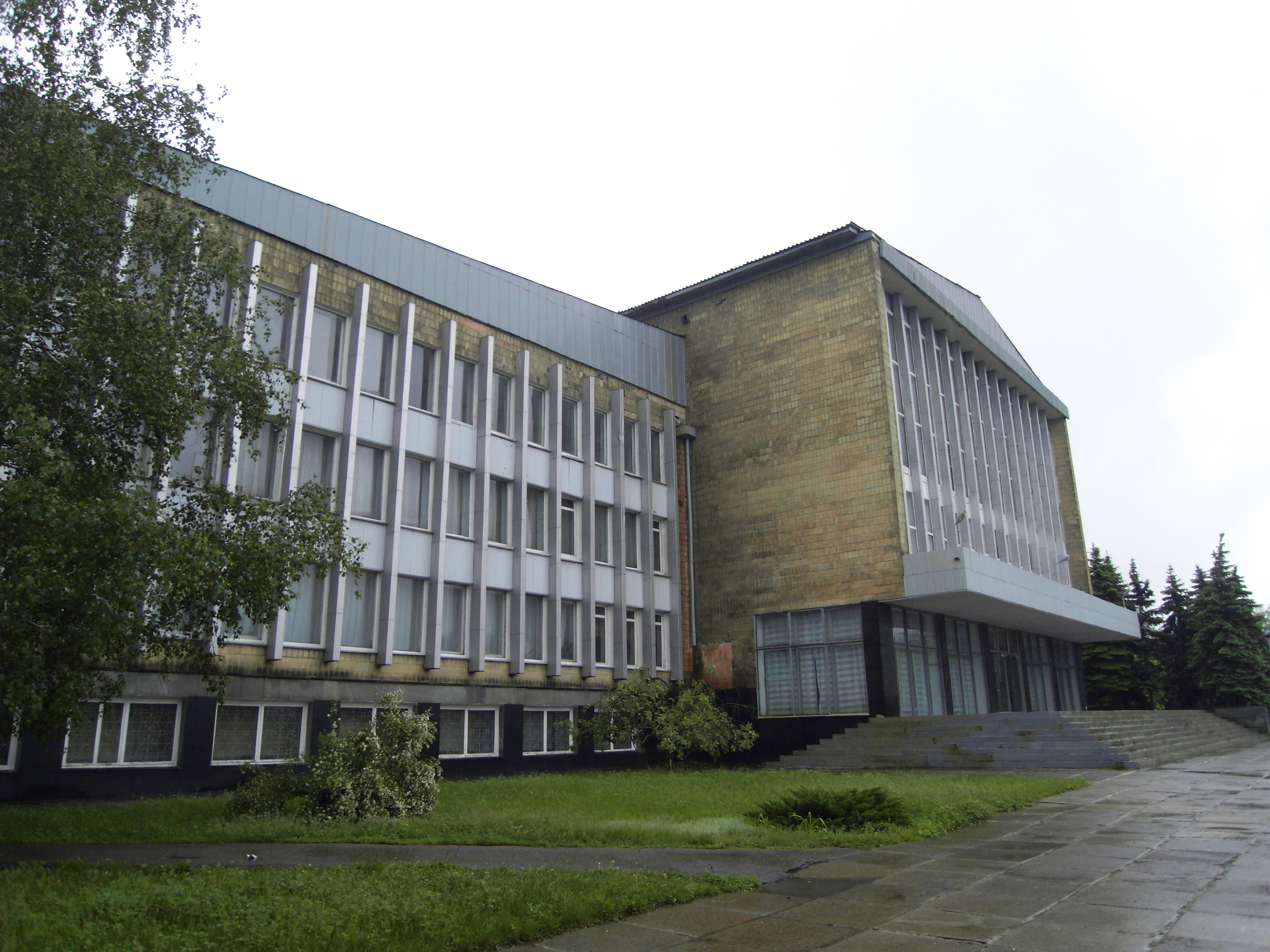
Palace of Culture "Ukraine" (2010).

8 hospitals (1,215 beds, 190 doctors), 9 comprehensive, 14 secondary, and 2 primary schools 14,700 students, 800 teachers), a mining technical school, a construction lyceum, a music school, 22 libraries, and a stadium. St. Macarius Church (the central church of the Toretsk deanery, which celebrated its centenary in 2004).

== Culture ==
In the first years after the October Revolution of 1917, a Palace of Culture was built in Shcherbinovka. In 1973, the Dzerzhinsk History Museum was founded at the Palace of Culture, which was awarded the title of People's Museum in 1992. Over the years, the Palace of Culture has also housed a puppet theatre, a circus studio, a rhythmic gymnastics club, and a ballet school.

In May 1977, the Soviet singer-songwriter Vladimir Vysotsky, who was touring the Donbass at the time, performed at the Ukraine Community Centre.

== Notable people ==
- Nikolai Ryzhkov (1929–2024), former Premier of the Soviet Union
- Raisa Azarh (1897–1971), Soviet physician
- Ihor Voronkov (born 1981), Belarusian footballer

== Gallery ==
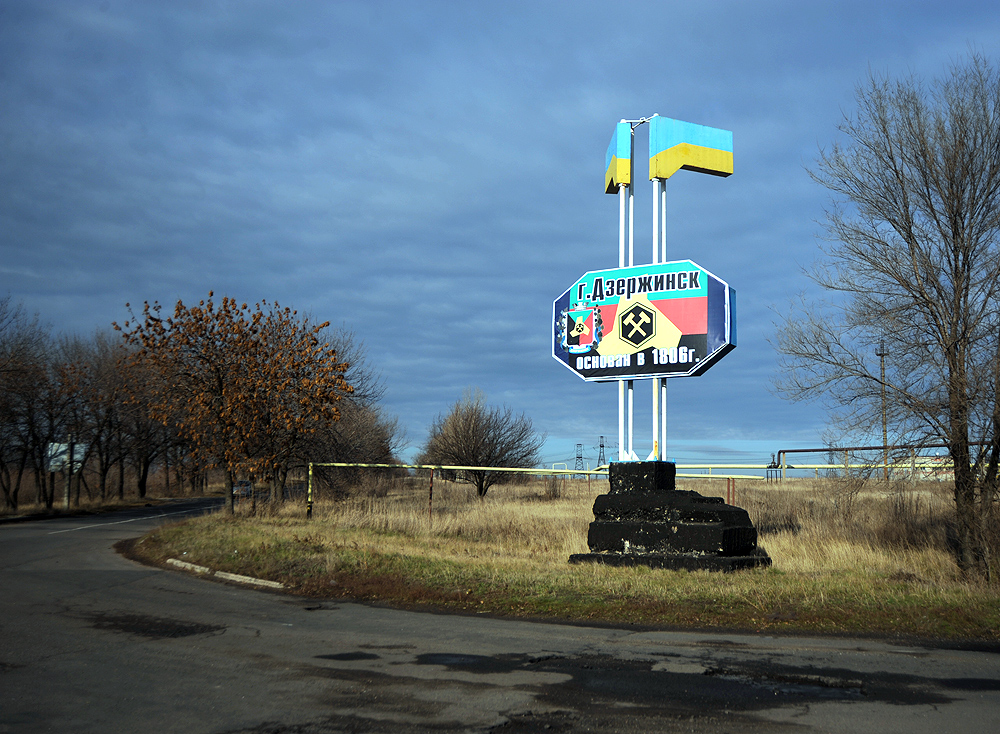
City entrance in 2008 when it was called Dzerzhynsk

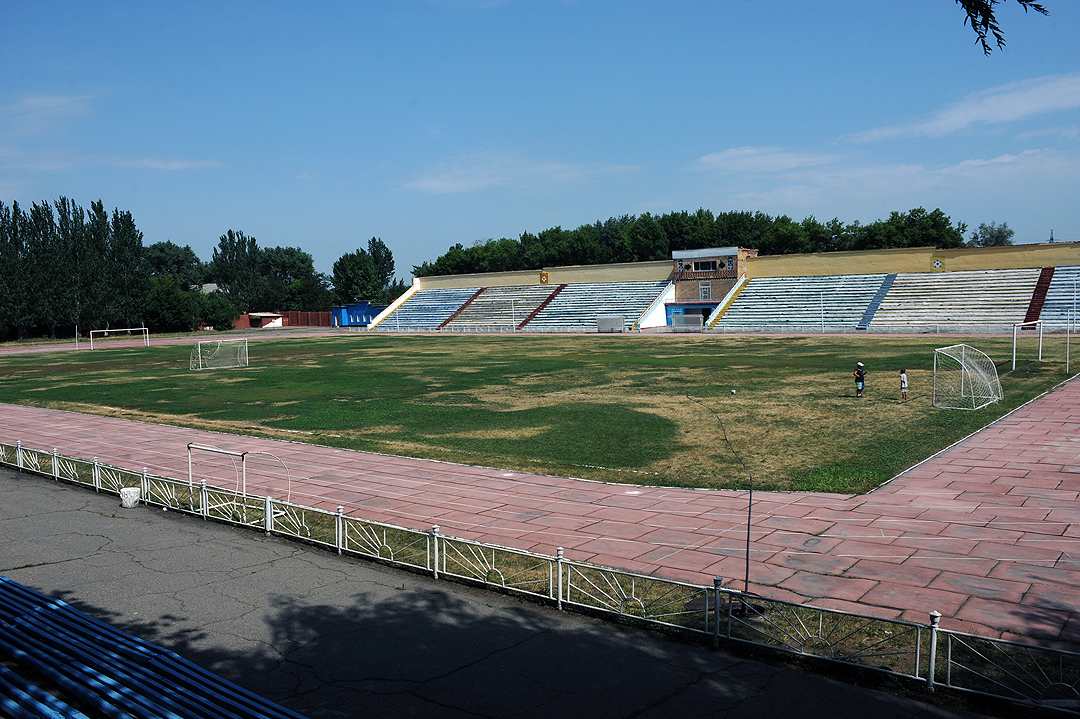
Toretsk Avanhard Stadium

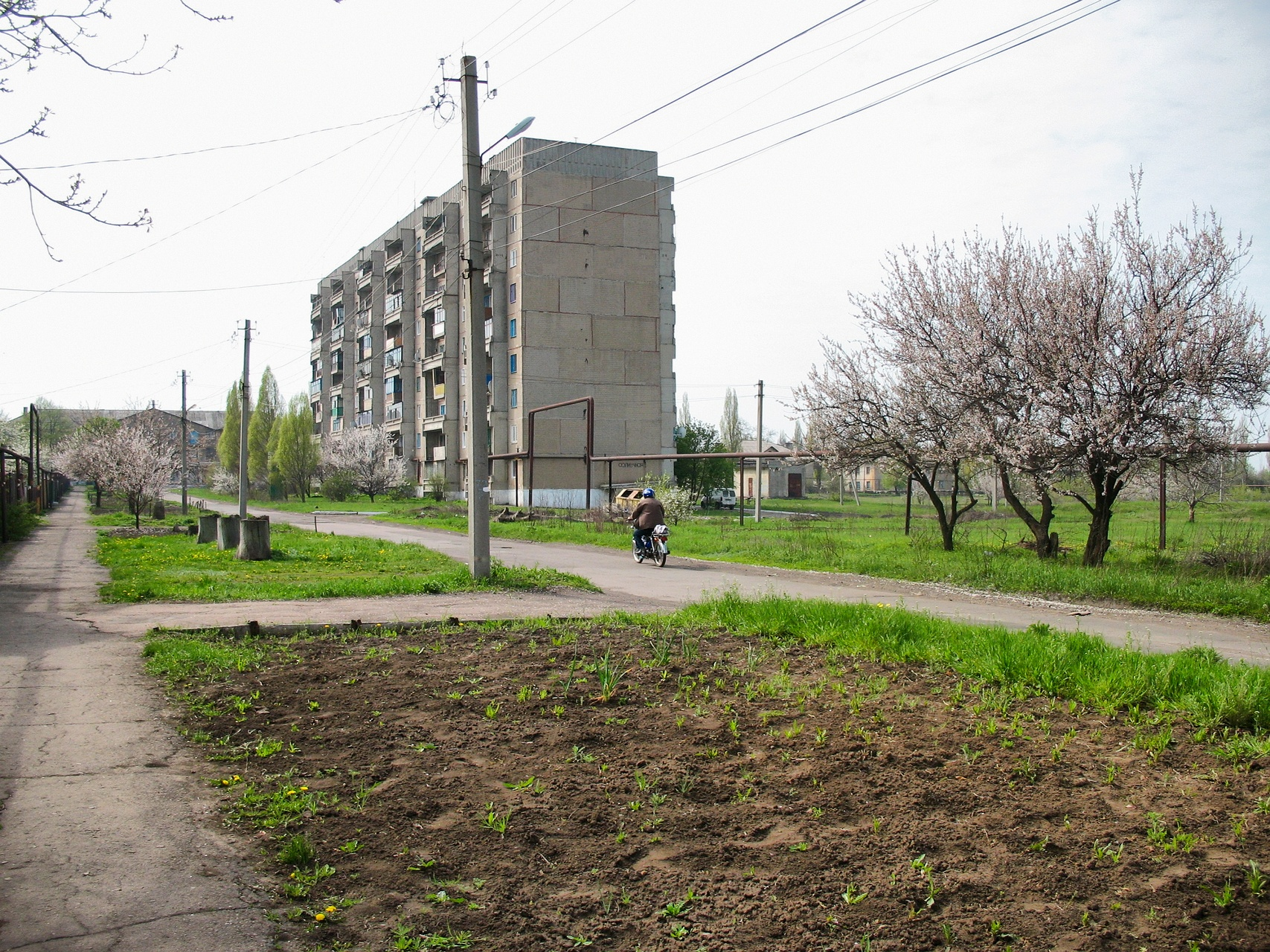
An apartment block in Toretsk

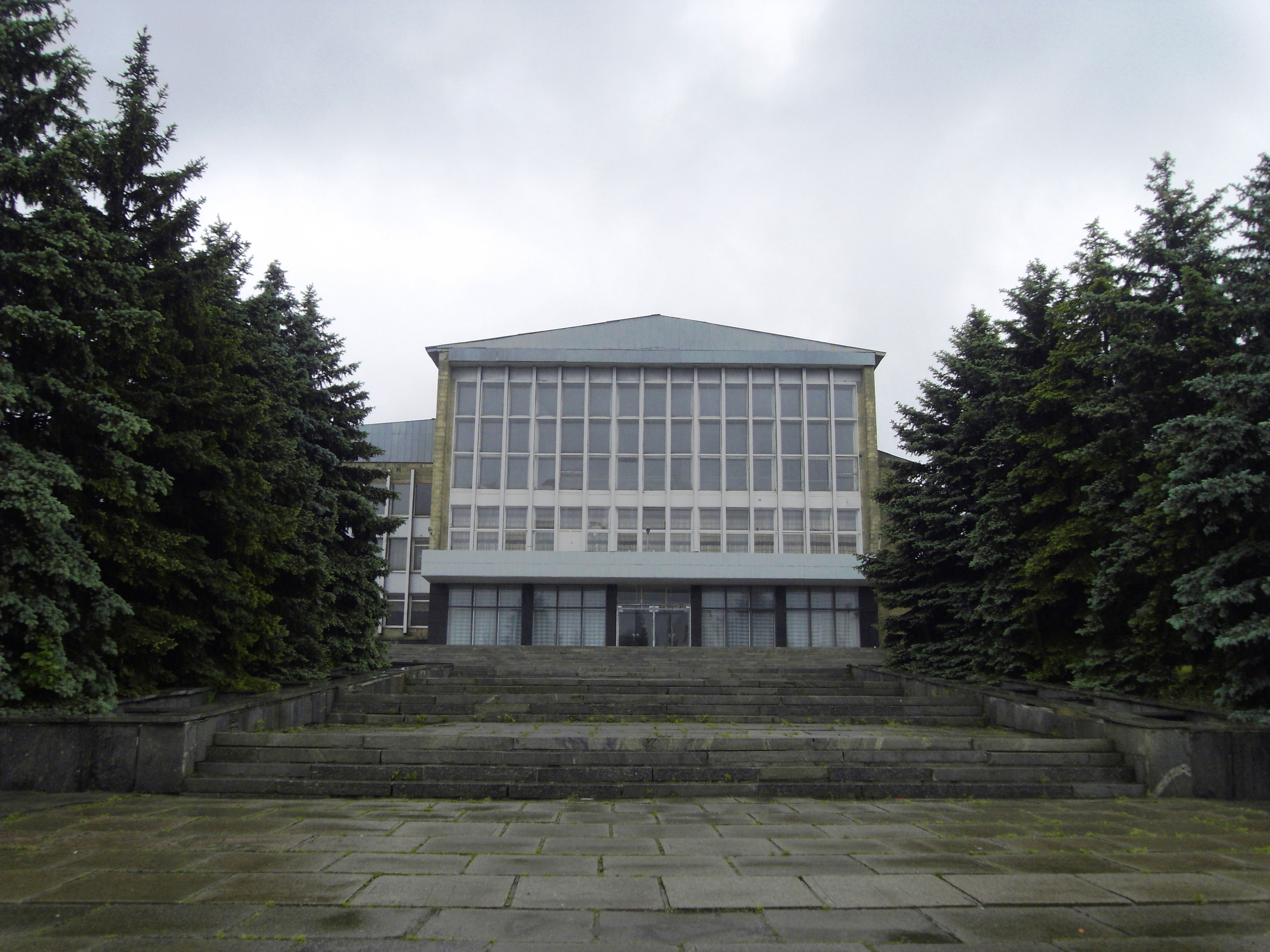
Ukraine Palace of Culture

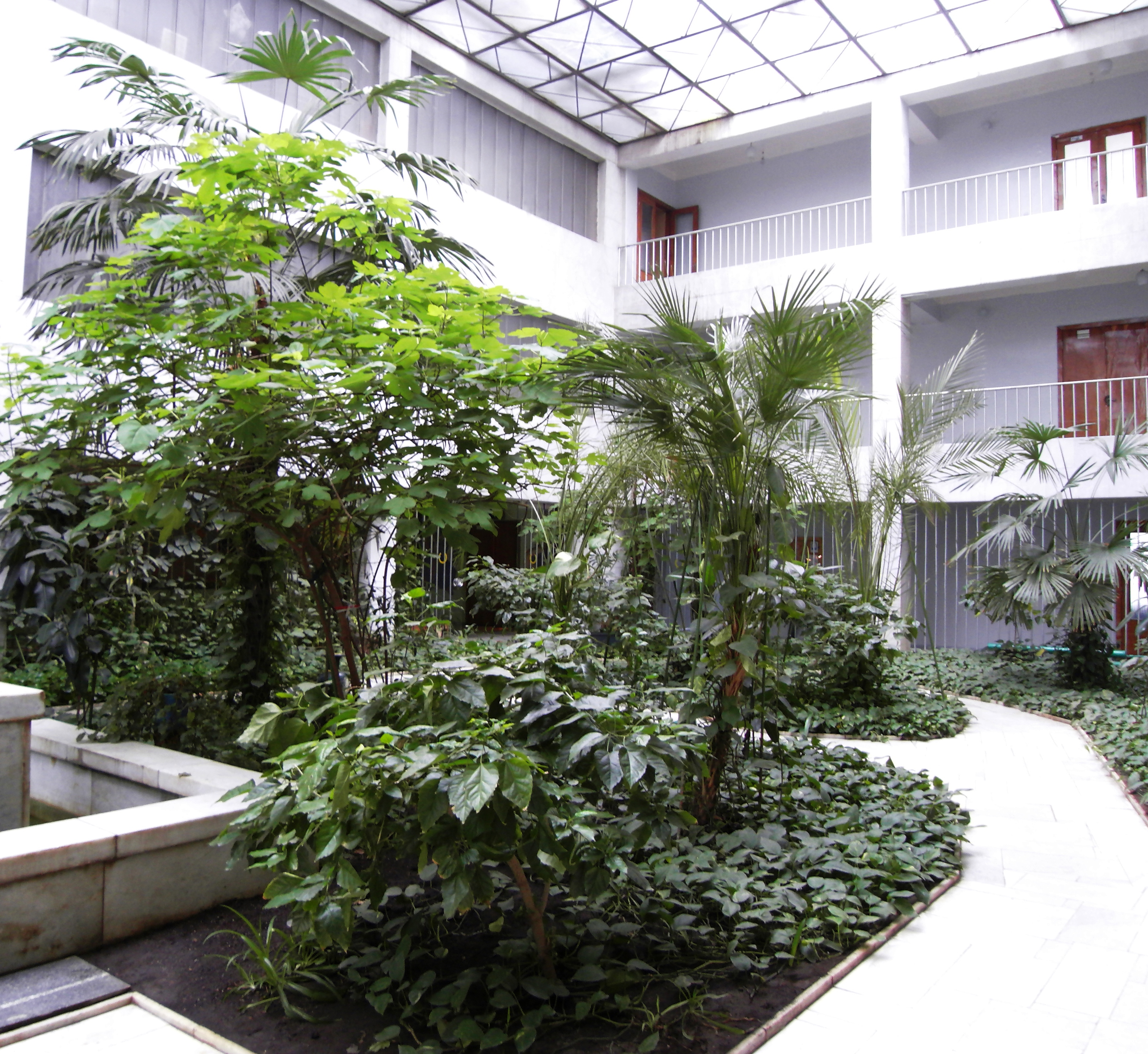
Ukraine Palace of Culture interior

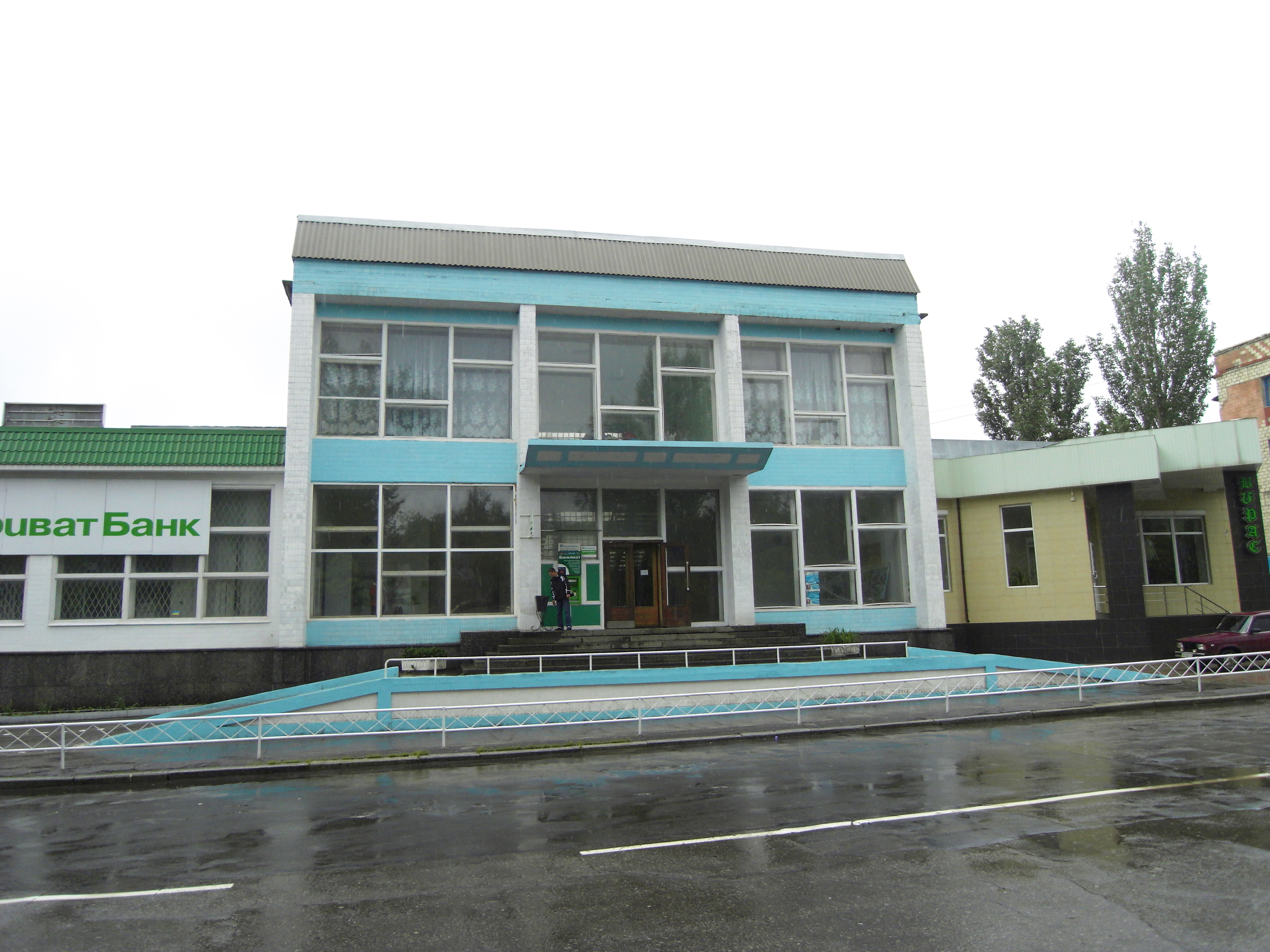
Buildings in downtown

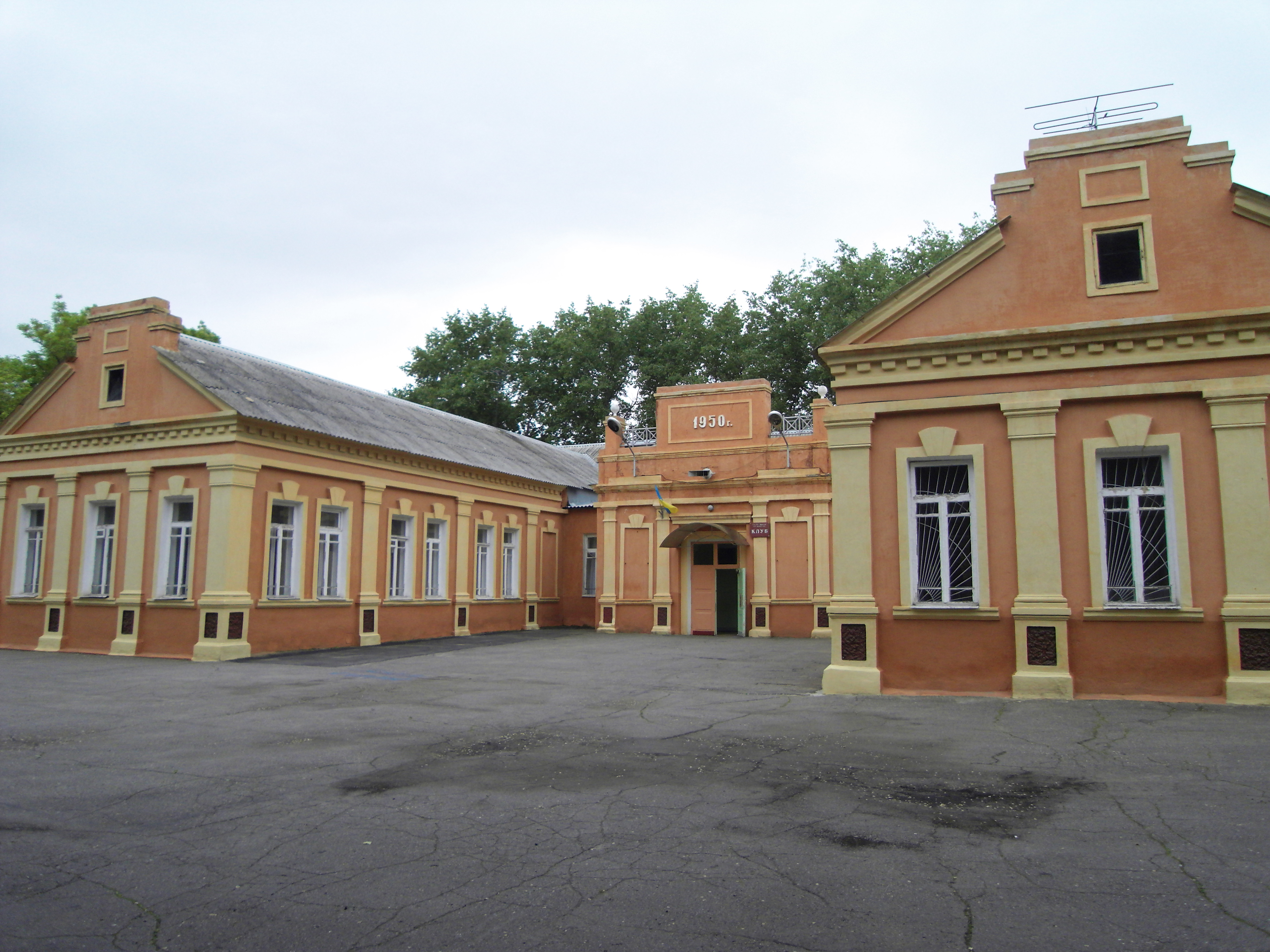
Toretsk phenol factory club

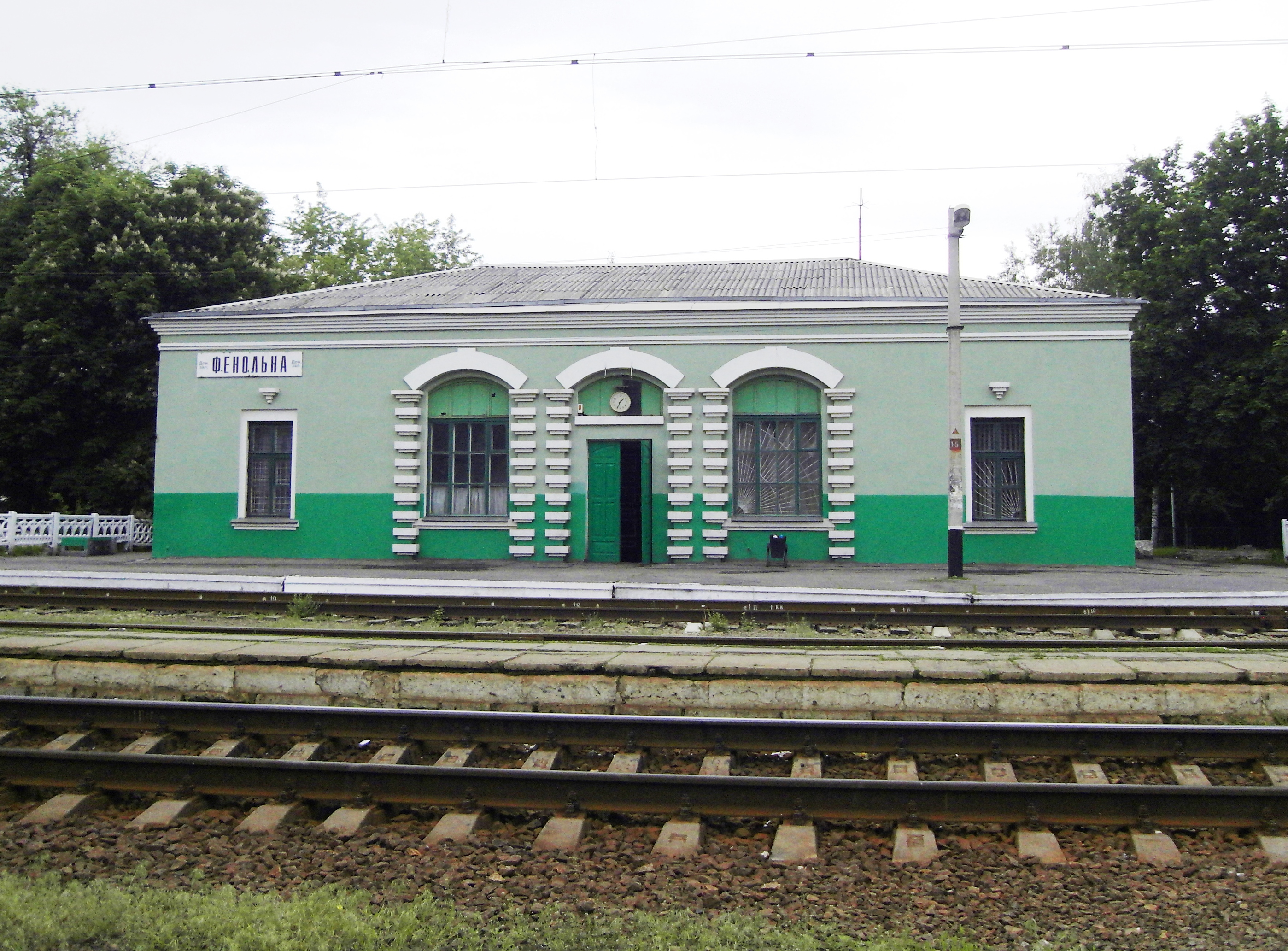
Toretsk railway station

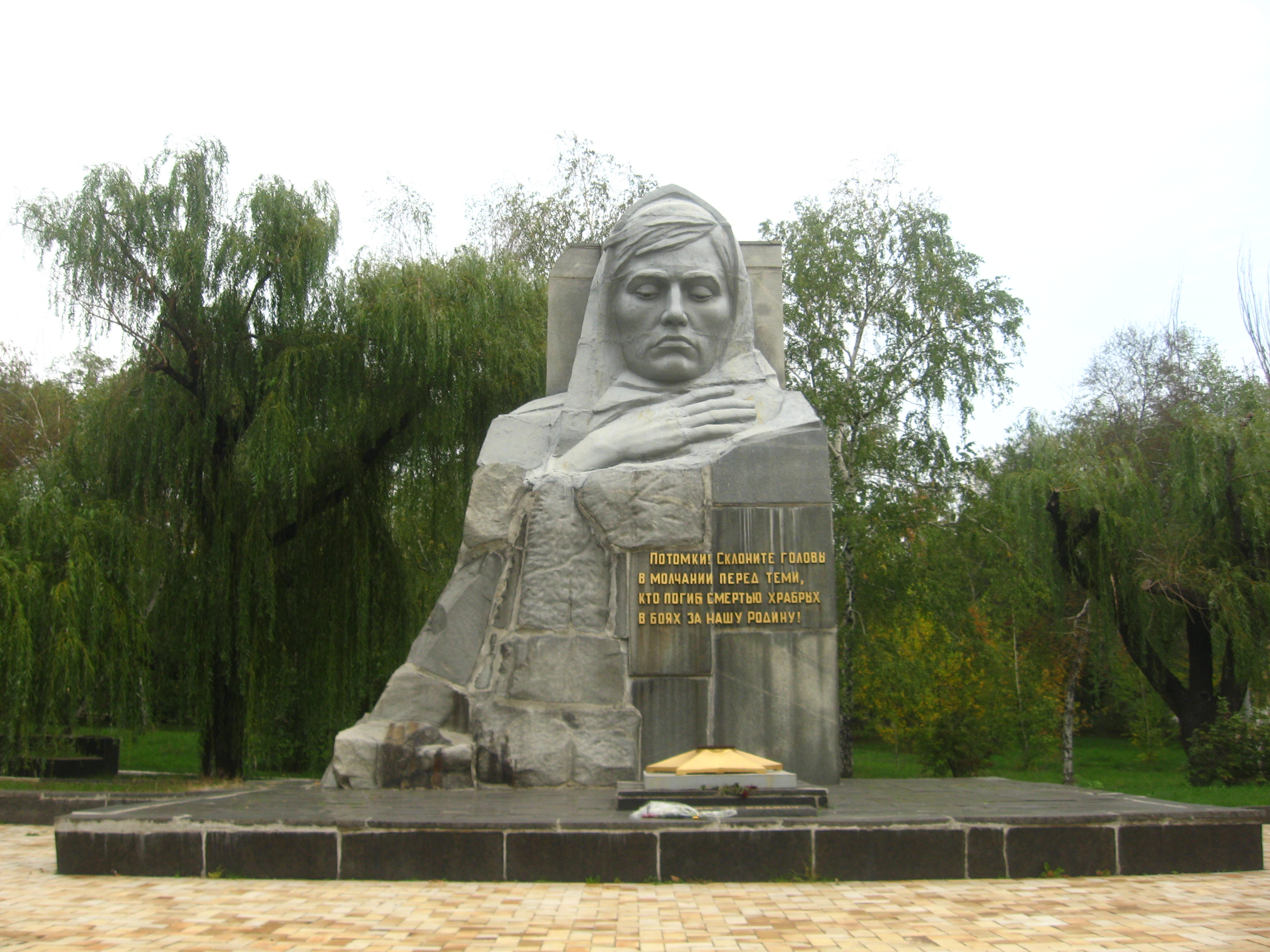
Crying mother monument
