= USC Pacific Asia Museum =

- U.S. National Register of Historic Places
- California Historical Landmark No. 988
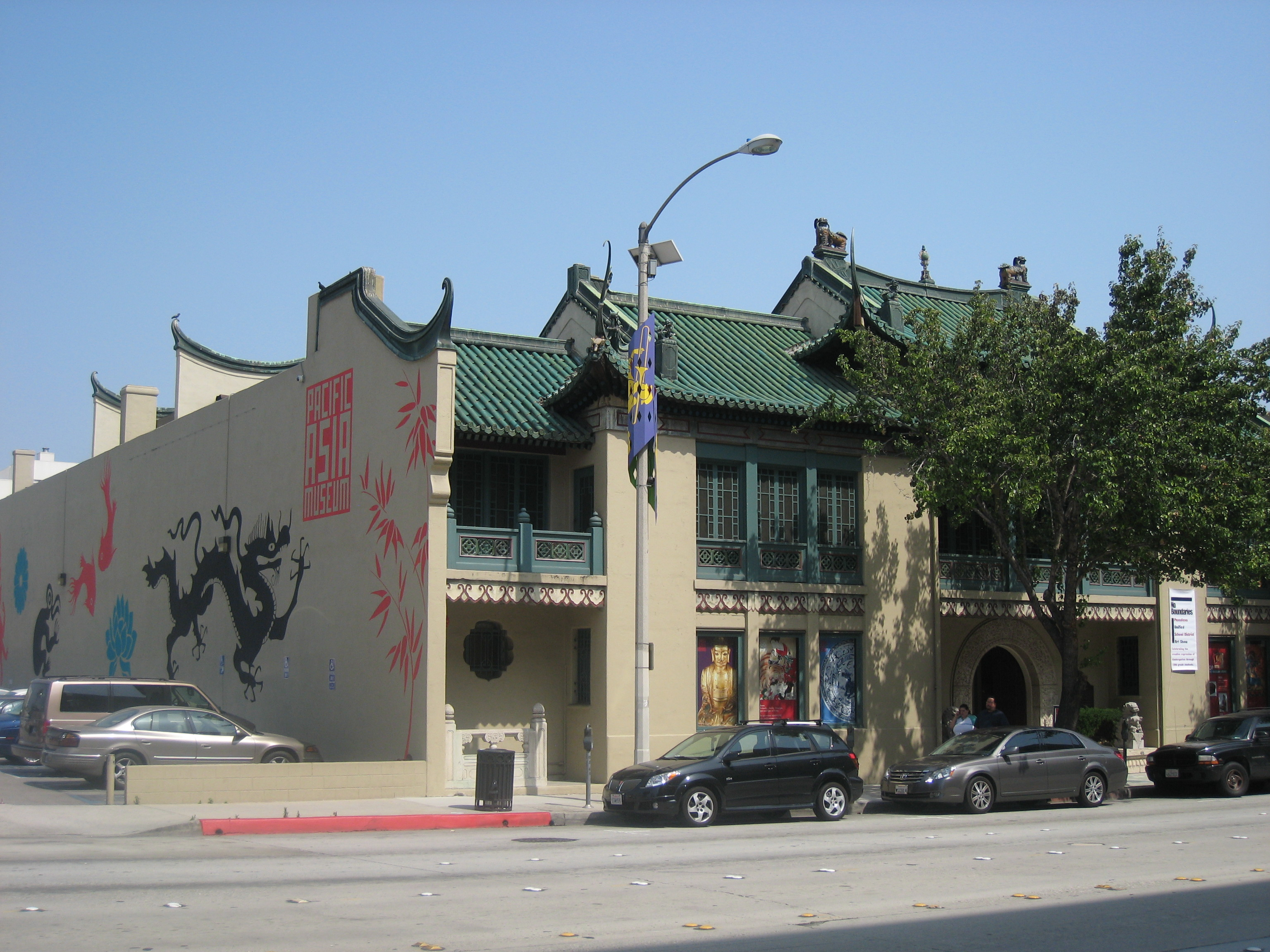
- USC Pacific Asia Museum, exterior.
- Location: 46 N. Los Robles Ave; Pasadena, California
- Coordinates: 34.1467°N 118.1411°W
- Built: 1924
- Architect: Marston, Van Pelt & Maybury
- NRHP reference No.: 77000300
- CHISL No.: 988
- Added to NRHP: July 21, 1977

USC Pacific Asia Museum is an Asian art museum located at 46 N. Los Robles Avenue, Pasadena, California, United States.

The museum was founded in 1971 by the Pacificulture Foundation, which purchased "The Grace Nicholson Treasure House of Oriental Art" from the City of Pasadena. Grace Nicholson donated the structure to the city for art and cultural purposes in 1943 and was a dealer in Native American and, later, Asian art and antiques. It houses some 15,000 rare and representative examples of art from throughout Asia and the Pacific Islands. In 2013, the museum became part of the University of Southern California. The building was closed from June 27, 2016 to December 2017 for a seismic retrofit and renovation. It reopened on December 8, 2017 with new operating hours.

The building, which is listed in the National Register of Historic Places, was built in 1926 and designed by the architectural firm of Marston, Van Pelt & Maybury. It is designed in the style of a Chinese imperial palace and features a central courtyard with a garden, a small pool, and decorative carvings.

== Galleries ==
- The Art of Pacific Asia
- Japanese
- Snukal Ceramics
- Journeys: The Silk Road
- South and Southeast Asian
- Himalayan
- Korean

== Notable exhibits ==
The museum has a collection of more than 15,000 items from across Asia and the Pacific Islands, spanning over 5,000 years. Prominent holdings include the "Harari Collection" of Japanese paintings and drawings from the Edo (1600-1868) and Meiji (1868-1912) periods, one of the largest collections of Japanese folk paintings outside Japan.

The museum's exhibits also look at the mash-up of Chinese calligraphy and American graffiti:

- China Modern: Designing Popular Culture 1910-1970 (August 6, 2010- Feb. 6, 2011)
- Japan in Blue and White (March 25, 2010- March 6, 2011)
- "Following the box"- Exhibition inspired by found photographs taken in India during World War II ( Sep 2019- Jan 2020)

In 2024, the museum's exhibit "Another Beautiful Country" explored the work of Chinese American artists. It was curated by art historian Dr. Jenny Lin, a professor at the University of Southern California.

== California Historical Landmark Marker ==
California Historical Landmark Marker NO. 988 at the site reads:

- NO. 988 PACIFIC ASIA MUSEUM (GRACE NICHOLSON'S TREASURE HOUSE OF ORIENTAL AND WESTERN ART) - Grace Nicholson, a noted collector and authority on American Indian and Asian Art and artifacts, supervised the design of her combination gallery and museum which was completed in 1929. It has been called an outstanding example of 1920s revival architecture and is unique for its use of Chinese ornamentation.

== Gallery ==
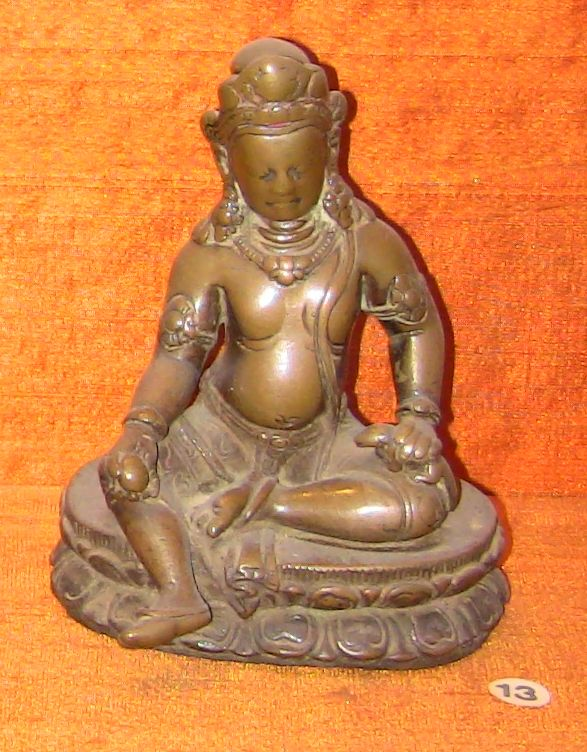
Yaksha Kuber, USC Pacific Asia Museum

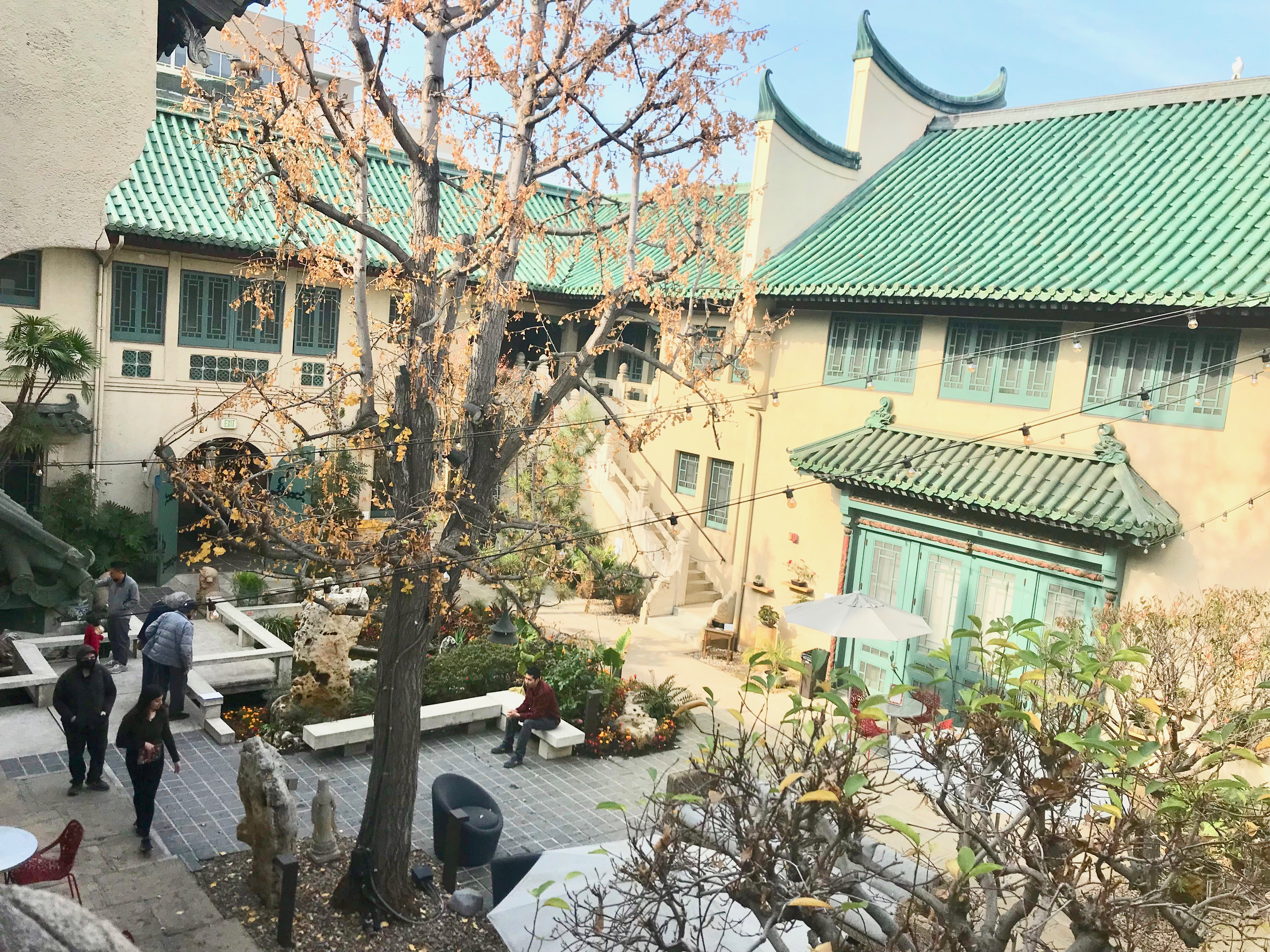
The museum's courtyard

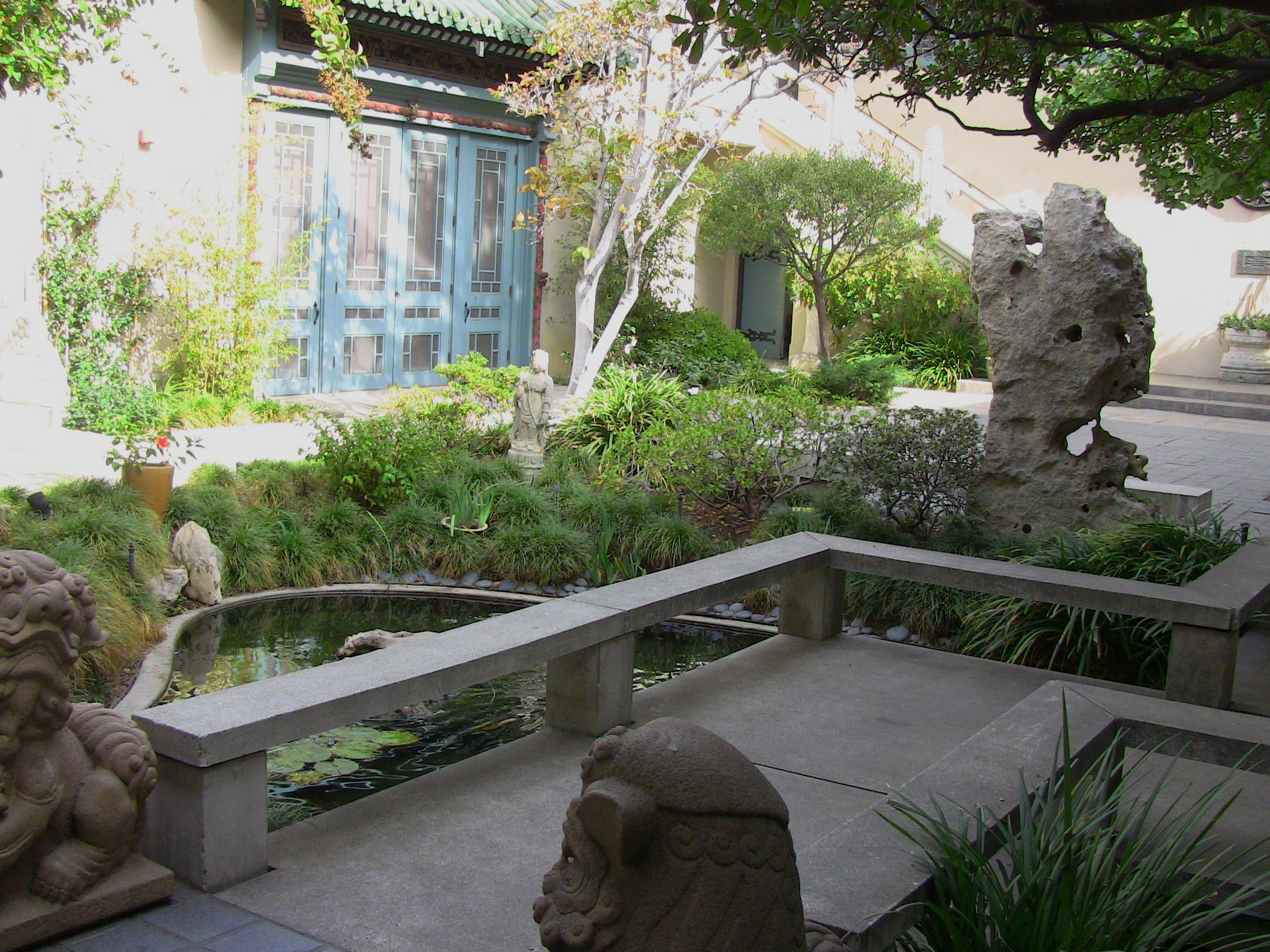
Central courtyard

== See also ==
- Chinese garden - the museum courtyard
