= Battle of Toretsk =

Battle in the Russo-Ukrainian war from 2024 to 2025

- Part of the eastern front of the Russo-Ukrainian war (2022–present)
- Situation around Toretsk in early August 2025
Date	18 June 2024 – 7 August 2025 (1 year, 1 month and 20 days)
Location	Toretsk, Donetsk Oblast, Ukraine; Surrounding satellite settlements
Status	Russian victory
Territorial changes	Russian forces capture Toretsk and the settlements of Shumy, Zalizne, Pivdenne, Druzhba, Pivnichne, Niu-York and Petrivka

Belligerents
Russia; Russian Armed Forces	Ukraine; Armed Forces of Ukraine

Units involved
Russian Ground Forces; 2nd Guards Combined Arms Army; 27th Motor Rifle Division; 506th Motor Rifle Regiment; 589th Motor Rifle Regiment; 51st Guards Combined Arms Army; 1st Separate Guards Motor Rifle Brigade; 109th Separate Rifle Regiment; "Tserber" group; 9th Separate Guards Motor Rifle Brigade; Somalia Battalion; 2nd Motor Rifle Battalion; 132nd Separate Guards Motor Rifle Brigade; 101st Separate Rifle Regiment; 3rd Battalion; Sparta Battalion; 56th Separate Special Purpose Battalion; 8th Guards Combined Arms Army; 150th Guards Motor Rifle Division; "Afipsa" Storm Battalion; 103rd Motorized Rifle Regiment; 238th Artillery Brigade; "Orcs" drone detachment	Ukrainian Ground Forces; 12th Azov Brigade; 28th Mechanized Brigade; Special Operations Forces; 8th Separate Regiment; 2nd Tank Company; National Guard of Ukraine; 35th Regiment; Special Tasks Patrol Police; Safari Regiment; Khyzhak Brigade

Casualties and losses
- See § Casualty claims

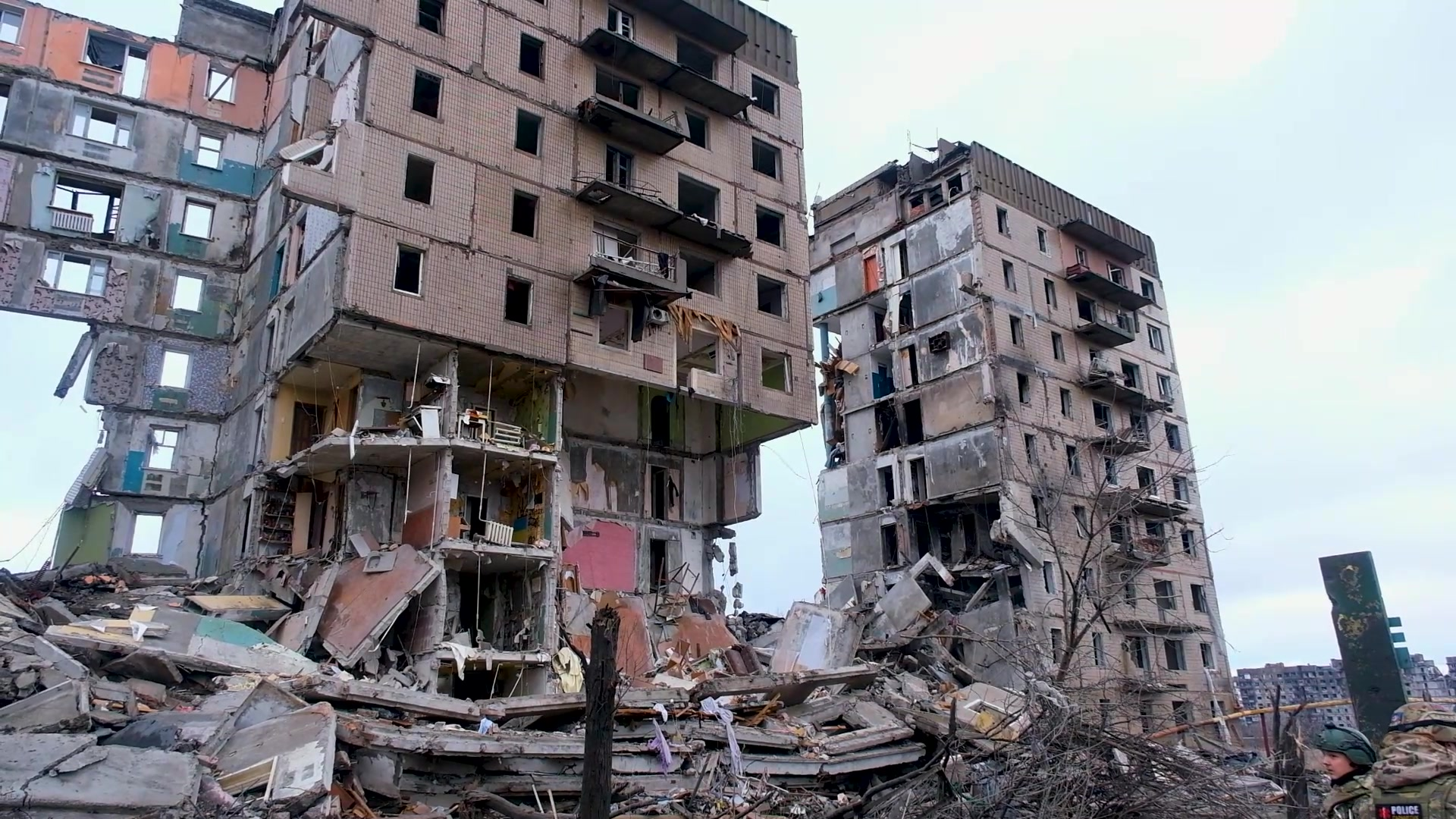
Apartment building in Pivnichne selttlement near Toretsk, December 2023

The Battle of Toretsk was an engagement in the Russo-Ukrainian war between the Russian Armed Forces and the Armed Forces of Ukraine for control of the city of Toretsk and the settlements in the surrounding area, (Note: to the east, Pivdenne, Zalizne, Druzhba, Pivnichne, and Shumy, and to the south, Niu-York) beginning on 18 June 2024. The effort to control the city was part of the renewed effort to capture portions of Donetsk Oblast. By 7 August 2025, after over a year of urban warfare, Russia seized the city, the largest captured since Bakhmut over two years earlier.

== Battle ==
=== First attacks and capture of Shumy (18 June – 1 July) ===
The first offensive engagements in the direction of Toretsk by the Russian Armed Forces began on 18 June 2024, when the settlements of Pivdenne, Pivnichne, and Niu-York saw the first assaults in recent months. Ukrainian officials the same day reported a "sudden increase" in Russian attacks in the main city's direction. DeepStateMap.Live showed on 18 June a Russian advance in the general direction of Druzhba and Pivnichne.

Russian milbloggers first claimed advances of Russian forces in the Toretsk direction on 19 June, including an advance into Pivnichne, although these claims were not corroborated by western sources. Russia continued to assault the settlements coming under fire the previous day, and in addition the localities of Zalizne, Druzhba, and Shumy.

On 20 and 21 June, Russian forces continued assaults on cities surrounding Toretsk, and Russian sources claimed an advance up to southern Niu-York. Nazar Voloshyn, a Ukrainian Armed Forces spokesperson, on 21 June analyzed that the new Russian offensive was likely an attempt to "develop an offensive" on the contested city of Chasiv Yar from the south.

DeepStateMap.Live showed and a Ukrainian source reported on 21 June that Russian forces had captured Shumy, and Russian milbloggers continued to claim advances in Pivnichne, as well as in Pivdenne and Druzhba on 22 June. On 23 June, the claims of Russian advances in Pivnichne, in addition to the seizure of Shumy, were confirmed by a Ukrainian military observer.

Russian forces advanced near Druzhba on 24 June, and continued attacks in Pivnichne, Pivdenne, and Niu-York. Russian sources claimed on 26 June further advances in Pivnichne and Druzhba, and an advance in the direction of southern Niu-York. The Institute for the Study of War (ISW) on 27 June analyzed that advancing in Toretsk was not currently a major priority for Russia, as they had not committed many forces to the operation so far, and assessed that major Russian gains in the area would not be likely to come quickly. Russian sources claimed on 27 June that Russia had reached outer Zalizne and entered Niu-York, although the latter claim would not be confirmed by non-Russian sources until early July. Toretsk was claimed by a Russian source to be 1.5 kilometers from the frontline due to recent Russian advances, but this was refuted by the ISW who assessed on 28 June that Russian forces were around three kilometers from Toretsk.

On 29 June, Russia made slight gains in Druzhba, and Russian sources claimed advances near Pivnichne, Pivdenne, and Zalizne. The Russian Ministry of Defense claimed on 30 June that their forces had advanced through Pivnichne by making a surprise attack on Ukrainian positions by bypassing land through an underground tunnel. A Ukrainian military observer stated that the Russian advance in the Toretsk direction on 30 June was 2.6 kilometers, and noted that the advances in Pivdenne by Russia had encountered "little resistance".

=== Entrance into Niu-York and further advances (2 July – 21 August) ===
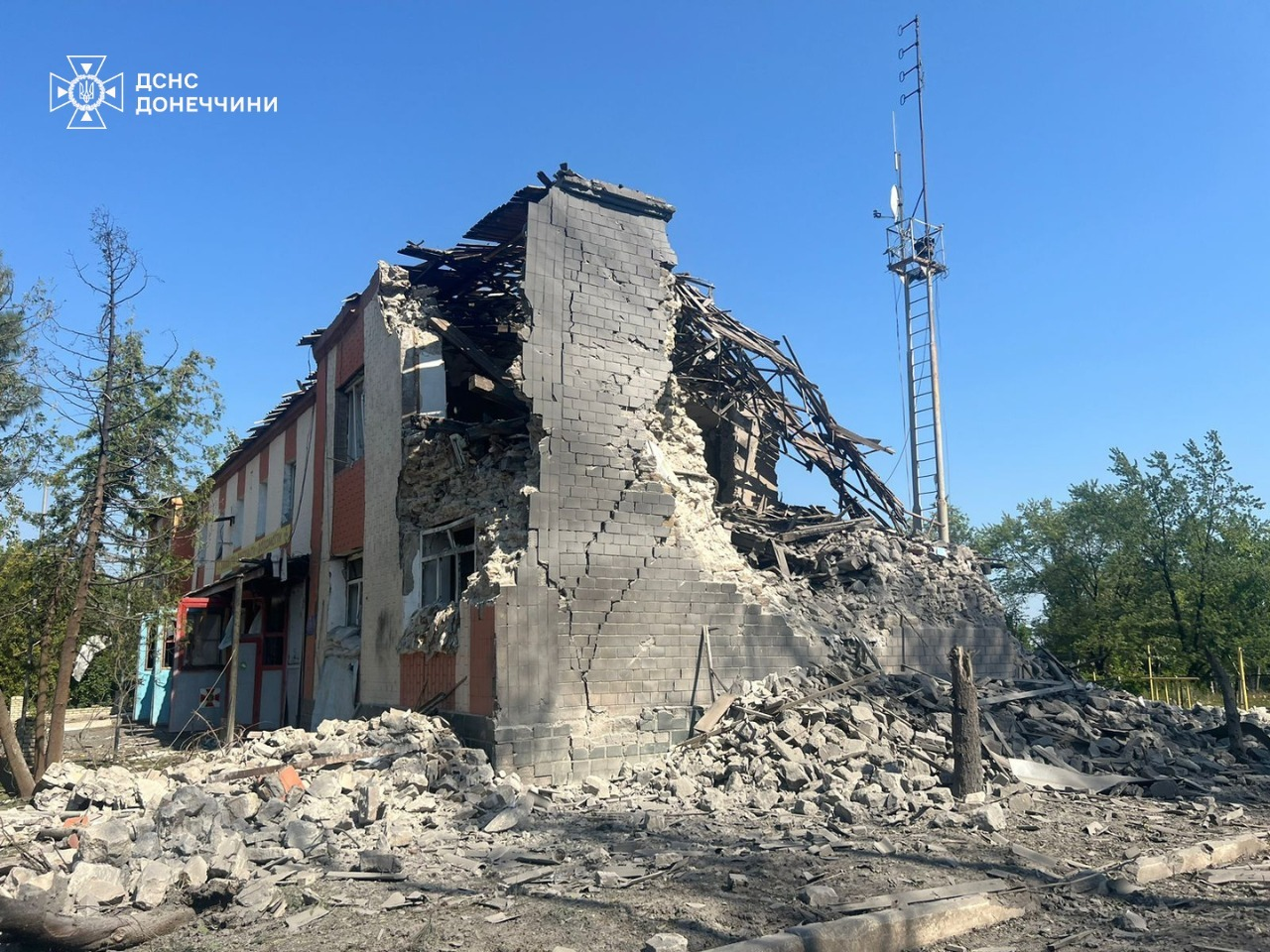
A building in Toretsk after Russian shelling in July 2024

DeepStateMap.Live showed on 2 July that Russian forces advanced around four kilometers towards Niu-York, the first confirmed advance near the settlement, and in the process occupied parts of the village of Yurivka. A Russian and Ukrainian source both reported similar advances. Russian forces on 3 July and the days prior advanced significantly in the Toretsk direction from the east, reaching and contesting eastern Pivnichne and Druzhba.

Toretsk itself first came under Russian pressure on 5 July through additional Russian advances in Pivnichne and Druzhba, but is not yet contested and has not been entered by Russian forces.

By 12 July, Russian forces had further advanced in Niu-York and were contesting the central portion of the settlement. A Ukrainian spokesperson stated a Russian decrease in prioritization of the battle of Chasiv Yar, and that more effort was being given to advance towards Toretsk. Russia continued to attempt to advance towards Toretsk from both Niu-York in the south and the collection of villages in the east on 12 July. The ISW reported that central Zalizne had been reached by Russian forces on 13 July, and Russian sources claimed further advances near Pivnichne.

On 17 July, Ukrainian forces recaptured territory southeast of Niu-York along a windbreak. The same day, Russian sources claimed further advances in southern Niu-York, and confirmed Russian advances were made on 18 July in the eastern portion of the settlement. Russian sources claimed advances in Druzhba, Pivnichne, and Zalizne as well. On 19 July, Russia made further confirmed advances in eastern Druzhba, particularly along Petra Velykoho Street, and Pivnichne. Advances were claimed by Russian sources in Zalizne and southwestern Niu-York as well. On 22 July, further advances were made in Niu-York by Russian forces, with them seizing most of southwestern Niu-York and advancing up to Yesenina Street.

From 23 to 29 July, fighting continued in Druzhba, Niu-York, Pivdenne, Pivnichne, and Zalizne, and Russian forces made marginal advances east of Toretsk and in Niu-York. By 29 July, Russian forces had captured the eastern portion of Zalizne, and on 30 July the Russian Ministry of Defense claimed that their forces had seized the entirety of Pivdenne, 6 kilometres (3.7 mi) from Toretsk. Russian sources also claimed fighting occurring within Toretsk itself, although this was not confirmed by non-Russian sources. Russian forces have continued to shell and strike Toretsk, in part with guided glide bombs.

Russian forces continued to make marginal advances in the settlements surrounding Toretsk in early August. On 5 August, Russian forces signaled that they had seized most of northwestern Niu-York, however some sources claimed that Ukrainian forces recaptured this territory the following day. Russian sources also claimed that the entirety of Niu York had been seized by Russia, but this was not confirmed by non-Russian sources. Russian forces also made advances west of Niu York and in southwestern Zalizne in early August.

On 11 August, Russian forces captured the last parts of the line of defense dating to the war in Donbas, and with it the last Ukrainian-held territory adjacent to the territory in the Donbas held by Russian proxies prior to the full-scale Russian invasion of Ukraine; this territory was east to Niu-York, and allowed their forces to expand their control to 65% of the town. The same day, DeepStateMap.Live showed that Russia had captured the last parts of Pivdenne in the process of capturing the 2014 line of defense, and had advanced up to the eastern outskirts of Toretsk in Pivnichne.

On 18 August, DeepStateMap.Live showed that Russia had advanced to occupy almost all of Niu-York, and had advanced north into the village of Nelipivka. Russian sources further claimed a complete capture of Niu-York, the seizure of a waste heap in Zalizne, and an advance into eastern Toretsk.

=== Fighting within Toretsk (22 August 2024 – 31 December 2024) ===
On 22 August 2024, Russian forces reportedly made their first advance into Toretsk itself, advancing from Pivnichne into the eastern portion of the city. On 23 August, Russian forces, on another axis advancing from Zalizne, gained a foothold in southern Toretsk. Russian sources claimed that the Russian advance within Toretsk was along a front of a depth of 800 meters and a width of 750 meters. Russia continued to make marginal gains in eastern Toretsk in late August, while making continual advances in western Pivnichne in the area east of Toretsk.

By 6 September 2024, the situation in Niu-York had improved for Ukraine after the Azov Brigade managed to break out encircled Ukrainian troops and recapture part of Niu-York. Russian troops however continued advancing within the town, and managed to fully capture it by late September. By 20 September, Russian forces made further advances up to central Toretsk. On 21 September advances were made north from Niu-York into central Leonidivka, southwest of Toretsk.

Fighting continued through late September and early October, with Russian forces gradually advancing within Toretsk. Around 8 October, further advances within southern Toretsk, along Peremohy and Konstytutsyi streets, and in eastern Toretsk, were made. By 11 October, Russian forces had seized about half of Toretsk, as stated by the city's administrative head, and were trying to "quickly capture" the city. Around 1,150 people reportedly remained in Toretsk. A Ukrainian spokesperson denied that Russian forces controlled over half the city. Geolocated footage as of 15 October could confirm Russian control over 42% of the city.

In mid-October, Russian forces were confirmed to have taken full control over Nelipivka, advanced into the settlement of Shcherbynivka from the south, advanced west of Niu-York, and advanced northeast of Nelipivka. Russian forces additionally gained ground in central and eastern Toretsk.

In late October, Russian control over the Zabalka district (southern Toretsk) was lost to Ukrainian counterattacks. President Vladimir Putin said days later that Russia exerted control over two thirds of the city.

A Ukrainian battalion official in the Toretsk area said on 1 November that the amount of Russian assaults had decreased, and attributed this to Russian forces resting and refueling losses. Russia claimed the same day to have captured Leonidivka. Footage from early November indicated that Druzhba had come under Russian control, while a Ukrainian spokesperson said the same day that the tempo of Russian assaults had again increased. A Russian blogger said that Russian soldiers in the Toretsk area, said by a Ukrainian source to amount to 21,000, had been hampered in their ability to advance by the weather conditions.

Footage from 10 to 11 November confirmed further Russian advances in eastern and central Toretsk, while southern Toretsk was again entered. Russian forces continued to advance in the central, northeastern, and southern parts of the city in mid-November. A Russian milblogger claimed that Krymske had been captured by Russian forces. Footage from 13 November showed that northern Toretsk had been entered by Russian forces. A Russian source reported on 22 November that Ukrainian and Russian soldiers would simultaneously occupy the same buildings in Toretsk, causing the exact frontline in the city to be unclear.

Russian sources said on 24 November that the eastern third of the Zabalaka district was definitely controlled by Russian forces, with the remainder being contested.

More Russian personnel were reportedly transferred to the Toretsk area in late November to assist in further offensive efforts. Russian forces made further advances in the Zabalka district in mid and late November, and in early December advanced in southern Toretsk up to the Tsentralna Mine and its waste heaps. According to a Russian blogger, Russian forces were trying to manoeuvre between the two mine heaps. He further said that the highly dynamic situation in the Zabalka district of southern Toretsk meant that the line of control in the area was ambiguous, even to those on the frontline.

Russian sources said on 4 and 5 December that nearly all of the Zabalka district had been captured, that advances had been made north of the Avanhard Stadium, and that the Tsentralna Mine had been seized. Geolocated footage confirmed Russian advances in central Toretsk northwest up to Svitla Street, in the waste heaps of the Tsentralna Mine, and in the southern parts of the Zabalka district. Russian forces made further visually-confirmed advances in central and southwestern Toretsk around 6 December, followed by further advances along Frunze Street in central Toretsk and inside Shcherbynivka around 9–10 December.

A Ukrainian battalion officer reported that small-sized Russian infantry assault groups were using fiber optic drones to combat Ukrainian electronic warfare efforts.

In late December, Russian forces advanced along Tsentralna Street in Shcherbynivka, in what was reportedly a mechanized assault. Until 31 December, Russia captured most of the city.

=== Fighting in and around Toretsk (1 January 2025 – 7 August 2025) ===
Posted footage on 6 January 2025 showed that Russian forces had advanced to the northwestern administrative boundary of Toretsk. By 7 January, geolocated footage could confirm Russian control over 71% of Toretsk, with a Russian source offering a higher estimate of 90% Russian control. According to a Russian blogger, recent advances in the city had been accomplished by pushing in multiple directions simultaneously rather than one. A Ukrainian brigade spokesperson said that the size of Russian attack groups in Toretsk had increased around fourfold. On 8 January, a Russian source said that Ukrainian forces had been nearly forced back to the outskirts of the city.

In early January, Russian forces advanced from Shcherbynivka into the settlement of Petrivka. Russian forces made further advances in the northwestern outskirts of Toretsk on 10 January. As of mid-January, Russian forces control the urban area of Toretsk, with fighting ongoing around the city and its northern outskirts. Ukrainian forces indirectly admitted the loss of the city in late January.

In a situational report on 28 January, commander, military expert and historian Markus Reisner stated that the city was de facto occupied by Russian forces. By 30 January, a spokesman for Ukraine's 28th Mechanized Brigade told media outlets that the most active fighting was no longer taking place in Toretsk itself, but in the industrial zone of the village of Krymske, where advancing Russian forces were opposed by the 28th Brigade's "Shkval" battalion.

In early February, Reisner specified that the Russian forces have control over 95% of the city, with fighting only ongoing in the outskirts. Later on 7 February Russian forces claimed to have captured the rest of the city, while Ukraine denied this. According to DeepStateMap.Live, Russian forces had firm control over the city center, with fighting ongoing on the outskirts.

In late February and early March Ukrainian forces launched a major counterattack, leaving the Russian forces in northern Toretsk at risk of encirclement. Prior to this, Russia had controlled all of Toretsk except for the northern fringes. However, by late March the Russian forces had regained most of the lost territories and had further advanced to the north. By late June, the ISW showed entire Toretsk as captured by Russia with the exception of its central-western outskirts which were depicted as claimed, but not confirmed, to be captured. The Russian forces likely captured Petrivka on 14 July. During a company-sized mechanised assault on 7 August, the Russian army completed the seizure of Toretsk.

== Casualty claims ==
=== Military casualties ===
On 15 July 2024, Nazar Voloshyn, a spokesman for the Ukrainian military's Khortytsia group claimed that Russian casualties over the previous week in the "Toretsk sector" amounted to 635 personnel killed, 855 wounded, and 12 prisoners of war. On the morning of 16 July, Voloshyn claimed that Russia had lost 224 more personnel – with 72 killed, 147 wounded, and five POWs. The Ukrainian 425th Battalion reportedly captured 16 Russian troops sometime in August.

On 25 November, Maj. Anastasia Bobovnikova, a spokeswoman for Ukraine's Luhansk OT, claimed that Russia was losing 100 soldiers a day in Toretsk, or 5% of their losses across the front. On 2 December, Bobovnikova further claimed that Russian forces had suffered 500 casualties, "a mechanized battalion's worth of personnel", during one week of assaults within Toretsk.

On 13 December, the 4th Separate Unit of the Ukrainian National Guard claimed to have demolished a building occupied by Russian soldiers in Toretsk, "eliminating" 114 of them.

On 15 January 2025, the 12th Brigade Azov claimed to have captured 23 Russians who voluntarily surrendered in Toretsk.

On 2 August 2025, a spokesperson for a Ukrainian brigade operating in the Toretsk direction that Russian forces have lost 50,000 personnel, including more than 20,000 killed, in six months of fighting.

=== Civilian casualties ===
On 31 July 2024, Vasyl Chynchyk, the head of the Toretsk city military administration, claimed that 184 residents have been killed and 559 injured in the Toretsk urban hromada since the start of the invasion, though he did not specify how many had been lost since the Russians had directly attacked the city. He also said that 70% of Toretsk had been destroyed so far.

== Analysis ==
The Institute for the Study of War has repeatedly analyzed and predicted that Russian forces will not be able to make substantial gains in the direction of Toretsk, both due to a lack of committed forces to the offensive and the wide area of responsibility of the Central Military District, stretching from offensive maneuvers southwest of Donetsk to Toretsk, which they claim causes a lack of rapid offensive gains in any of the covered areas.

Dmytro Snehiryov, a military analyst, said that a Russian capture of Toretsk would be of strategic value as the city is an "important logistics center" and stands at an elevated position, and that with the offensive Russia is continuing to attempt to spread out the concentration of Ukrainian forces to make further advances. Ukrainian spokesperson Nazar Voloshyn has said that a Russian victory in Toretsk will allow for further attacks to the south of Chasiv Yar and an advance to flank it from the south.

== See also ==
- List of military engagements during the Russian invasion of Ukraine
- Battle of Avdiivka (2023–2024)
- Battle of Bakhmut
- Battle of Chasiv Yar
- Battle of Kurakhove
- Velyka Novosilka offensive
- Pokrovsk offensive
