= Leonidovka =

Leonidovka (Russian: Леонидовка) is the name of several inhabited localities:

- Leonidovka, Chishminsky District, Republic of Bashkortostan
- Leonidovka, Tuymazinsky District, Republic of Bashkortostan

== See also ==
- Leonidivka, Donetsk Oblast, a village in Ukraine
