= Druzhba, Donetsk Oblast =

Druzhba Дружба
- Rural settlement
- Location within Donetsk Oblast Location within Ukraine
- Coordinates: 48°24′36″N 37°54′37″E
- Country: Ukraine
- Oblast: Donetsk Oblast
- Raion: Bakhmut Raion
- Hromada: Toretsk urban hromada
- Elevation: 217 m (712 ft)

Population
  - Total: 1,860
- Postal code: 85286
- Area code: +380-6247

Druzhba (Ukrainian: Дружба) is a rural settlement in Toretsk urban hromada, Bakhmut Raion, Donetsk Oblast, eastern Ukraine.

== History ==
=== Russo-Ukrainian War ===
==== Russian invasion of Ukraine ====
On 21 July 2023, during the Russian invasion of Ukraine, Russian shelling killed two children and injured a woman in the settlement.

As part of a renewed effort to capture Donetsk Oblast, the Russian Armed Forces gained a foothold within Druzhba as well as other satellite settlements of Toretsk and the Niu-York urban area, as geolocated footage by DeepState confirmed.

== See also ==
- List of villages in Donetsk Oblast
