= 35th Sumsky Regiment (Ukraine) =

35th Separate Regiment
- 35-й окремий Сумський полк (Ukrainian)
- Regiment Insignia
- Founded: 1993
- Country: Ukraine
- Allegiance: Ministry of Internal Affairs
- Branch: National Guard of Ukraine
- Type: Regiment
- Role: Law enforcement and Protection of Ukrainian territorial integrity
- Part of: National Guard of Ukraine
- Garrison/HQ: Sumy
- Nickname: Sumysky
- Patron: Saint Sergius of Radonezh
- Engagements: Russo-Ukrainian war: Russian invasion of Ukraine; Battle of Rubizhne; Battle of Toretsk

Commanders
- Current commander: Lieutenant Colonel Oleksandr Kolesnikov

Insignia
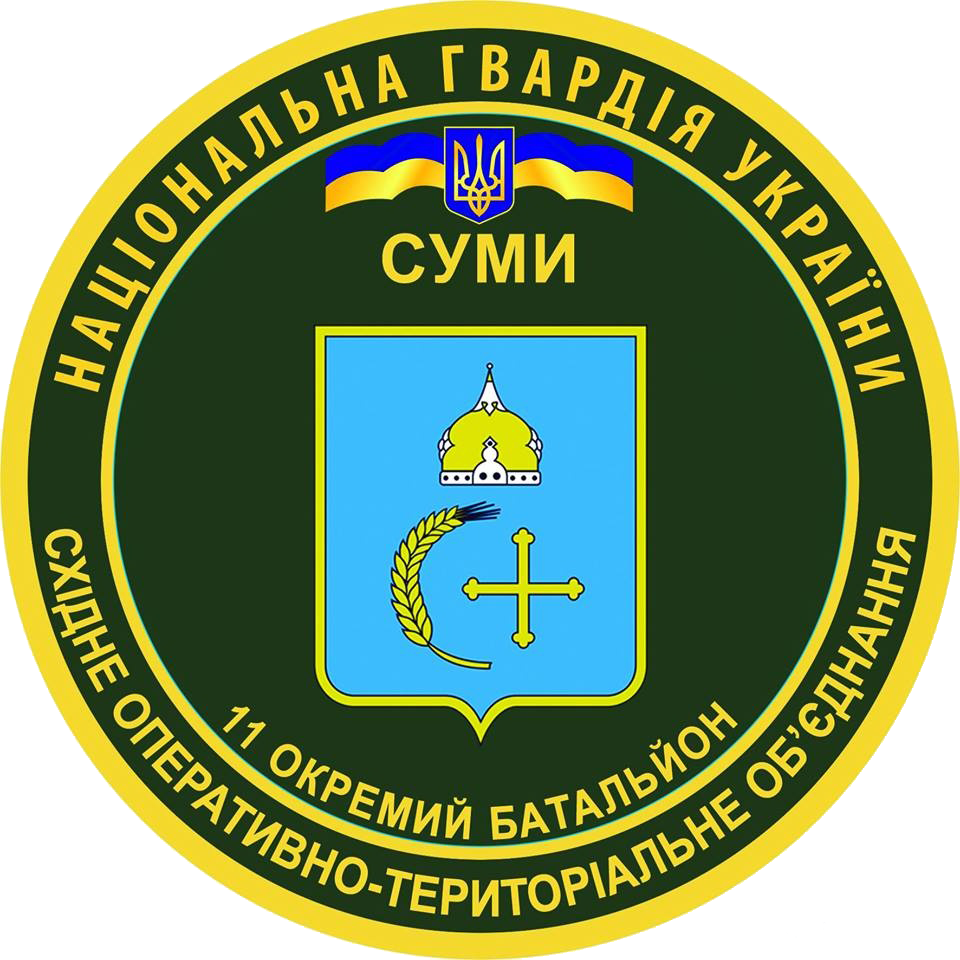
- Former Insignia

The 35th Separate Sumysky Regiment is a regiment of the National Guard of Ukraine tasked with law enforcement and protection of Ukrainian territorial integrity. It was established in 1993 as the 11th Convoy Battalion. It is headquartered in Sumy and has seen combat during the Russo-Ukrainian war on multiple occasions and is currently deployed on the frontlines.

== History ==
On 19 March 1993, the 11th convoy battalion was established in Kharkiv with Lieutenant Colonel Boris Germanovych Babintsev being appointed as its commander. On 20 February 20, 1997, subdivisions from the Military Intelligence Service were included in the unit.

- 7th Patrol Company
- 8th patrol company

On 18 September 2007, a prayer room "Saint Sergius of Radonezh" (battalion's patron saint) was established by Archbishop Mark of Sumy and Okhtyrka.

In October 2015, the battalion was being reformed into a regiment.

Following the Russian invasion of Ukraine, the regiment saw combat during the Battle of Rubizhne setting up an ambush on 20 March 2022, along with Sloviansk Brigade and Rubizh Brigade killing around twenty four Russian soldiers in a single assault.

In March 2024, its reformation was completed and it became the 35th Separate Sumysky Regiment of the National Guard. The regiment took part in the Battle of Toretsk during which on 12 September 2024, a soldier of the regiment (Maxim Butenko) was killed as a result of an artillery strike on New York.

== Structure ==
The structure of the regiment is as follows:

- 1st Patrol Company
- 2nd Patrol Company
- Transport Company
- Armoured Personnel Carrier Company
- Special Purpose Company
- Reserve Rifle Platoon
- 1st Support Platoon
- 2nd Support Platoon

== Commanders ==
- Lieutenant Colonel Babintsev Boris Germanovych (1993–1995)
- Colonel Magilin Vladyslav Oleksandrovych (1995-?)
- Lieutenant Colonel Igor Kovalev (2010–2015)
- Lieutenant Colonel Serhiy Kozynets (2015–2018)
- Lieutenant Colonel Yevhen Kazantsev (2018-?)
- Lieutenant Colonel Oleksandr Kolesnikov (?-)

== Sources ==
- В Сумах гвардійці прийняли присягу на Меморіалі Вічної Слави
- Сегодня воинская часть 3051 празднует 17-летие
- Національна гвардія України
- Воинская часть 3051: от батальона - до полка
- Сумской батальон Нацгвардии будет расширяться до полка
- Сумський батальйон Нацгвардії запрошує на роботу "контрактників"
- Сумські нацгвардійці долали смугу перешкод
- На Сумщині проведуть додатковий призов до Нацгвардії
- У Сумах тривають змагання кінологів
- Жителів Сумщини запрошують у стрілецький резервний взвод Нацгвардії
- У сумській частині Нацгвардії створено роту оперативного призначення
- У Сумах підрозділ оперативного призначення Нацгвардії завершив бойове злагодження
- Школярі побували в гостях у сумських гвардійців
- В Сумах нацгвардійці оволодівають практичною психологією
- Губернатор Сумщини хоче укріпити кордон з Росією
- На зборах командири рот НГУ вдосконалили професійні навички
- Сумські нацгвардійці вдосконалювали навички
- Заступник командувача Національної гвардії України з тилу – начальник логістики відвідав військову частину 3051
