= Pivdenne, Donetsk Oblast =

Pivdenne Південне
- Rural settlement
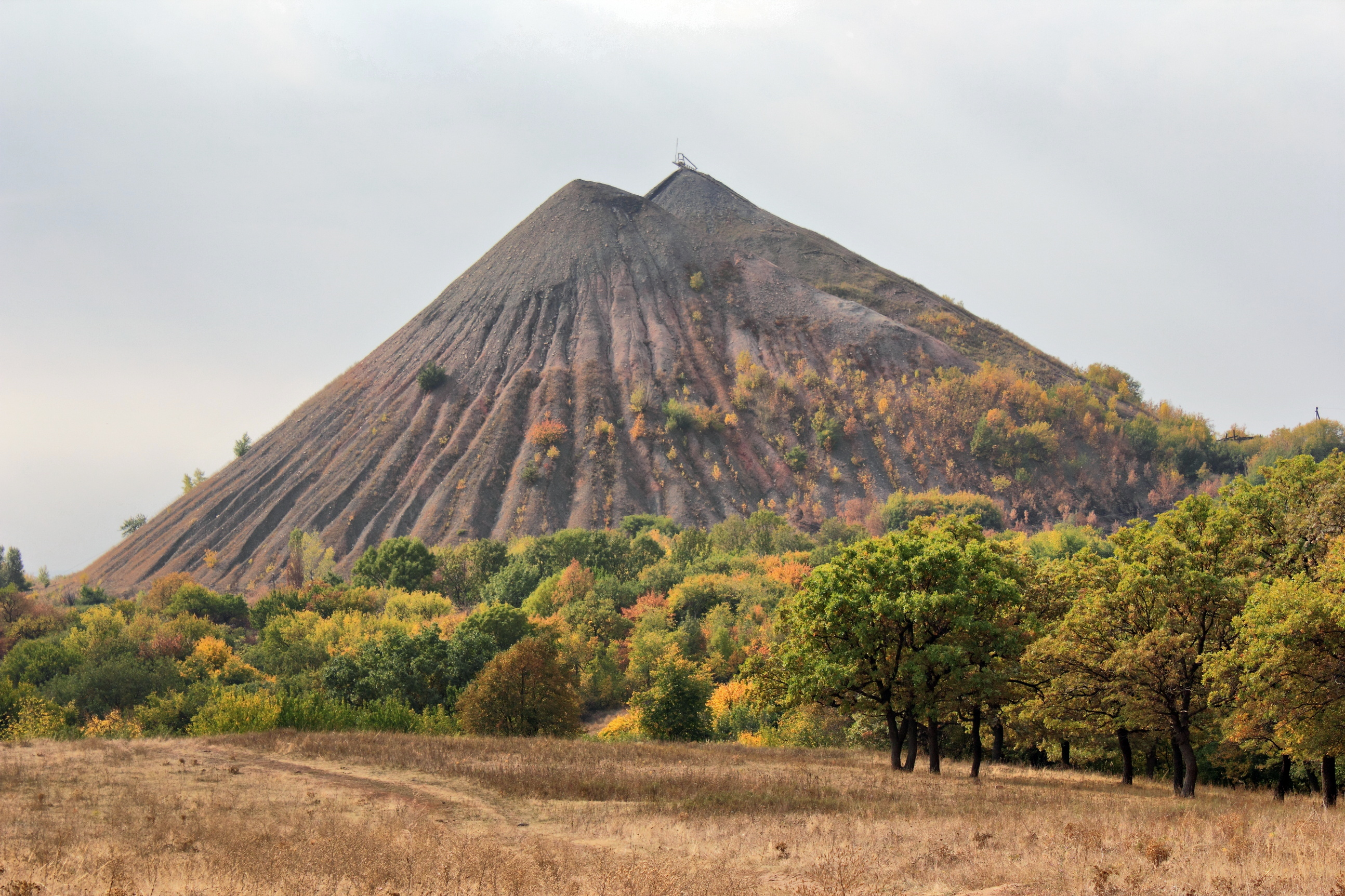
- Interactive map of Pivdenne
- Location of Pivdenne within Ukraine Pivdenne (Ukraine)
- Coordinates: 48.360278°N 37.927778°E
- Country: Ukraine
- Oblast: Donetsk Oblast
- Raion: Bakhmut Raion
- Hromada: Toretsk urban hromada
- Founded: 1877
- Elevation: 167 m (548 ft)

Population (2022)
  - Total: 1,404
- Time zone: UTC+2 (EET)
  - Summer (DST): UTC+3 (EEST)
- Postal code: 85293
- Area code: +380 6247

Pivdenne (Ukrainian: Південне; Russian: Пивденное) is a rural settlement (a selyshche) in Bakhmut Raion, Donetsk Oblast, eastern Ukraine. Before 2016, it was known as Leninske (Ukrainian: Ленінське). It is located 42.3 kilometres (26.3 mi) north-northeast from the centre of Donetsk city. Population: 1,404 (2022 estimate).

== History ==
The settlement has its origins in 1877, with the founding of the "South Russian" coal industry in the area. The name "Pivdenne" is derived from this, literally meaning "south". Control of the settlement changed several times during the Russian Civil War, before being finally made part of the Soviet Union, whose government named the settlement Leninske after Vladimir Lenin. During World War II, the settlement was occupied by Nazi Germany from October 1941 to September 1943. It received rural settlement status in 1957.

=== Russo-Ukrainian War ===
==== War in Donbas ====
During the war in Donbas, Leninske was captured by Russian proxy militant forces. In 2016, Leninske was renamed to Pivdenne. On 17 May 2018, Ukrainian government forces retook control of Pivdenne. On 21 May two Ukrainian servicemen were killed and four others were wounded at the settlement.

==== Russian invasion of Ukraine ====
During the Russian invasion of Ukraine in 2022, the settlement again came under attack by the Russian forces. On 26 January 2024, a new law entered into force which abolished the status of urban settlement, so Pivdenne became a rural settlement.

As part of a renewed effort to capture the Toretsk area, the Russian Armed Forces gained a foothold near Pivdenne as well as other satellite settlements of Toretsk and the New York urban area in June–July 2024, and by the end of July had captured most of the settlement. Russia claimed to have seized the entire settlement on 30 July 2024.

== Demographics ==
Population history

Year	Pop.	±%
1959	5,654	—
1970	4,352	−23.0%
1979	3,588	−17.6%
1992	2,700	−24.7%

Year	Pop.	±%
2001	1,951	−27.7%
2015	1,575	−19.3%
2022	1,404	−10.9%

The population of Pivdenne has steadily declined over the past half-century, from 5,654 in 1959 to only 1,404 in 2022. In censuses, the residents of the settlement mostly reported their ethnic background as Ukrainians and Russians.
