= Zalizne =

City in Donetsk Oblast, Ukraine

Zalizne Залізне
- City
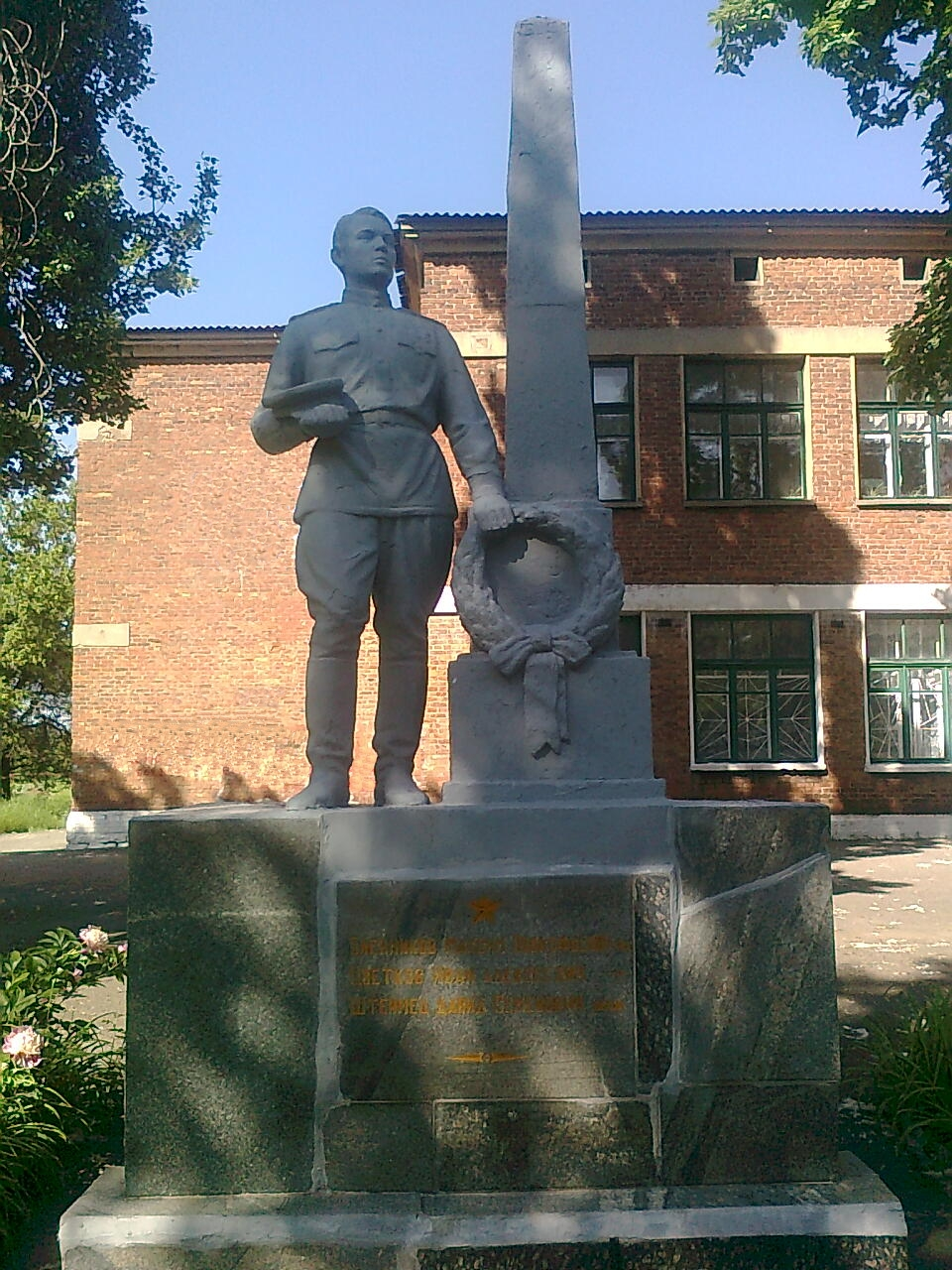
- Soviet war monument
- Interactive map of Zalizne
- Location within Donetsk Oblast Location within Ukraine
- Coordinates: 48.37083°N 37.88550°E
- Country: Ukraine
- Oblast: Donetsk Oblast
- Raion: Bakhmut Raion
- Hromada: Toretsk urban hromada
- Foundation: 1894
- City rights: 1938

Government
  - Mayor: Naumov Volodymyr Oleksandrovich

Area
  - Total: 7 km^{2} (2.7 sq mi)
- Elevation: 200 m (660 ft)

Population (2022)
  - Total: 4,928
  - Density: 700/km^{2} (1,800/sq mi)
- Postal code: 85290—85292
- Area code: +380-6247

Zalizne (Ukrainian: Залізне, IPA: [zɐˈl⁽ʲ⁾izne]), formerly Artemove(1921-2016) (Ukrainian: Артемове; Russian: Артёмово), is a city in Bakhmut Raion, Donetsk Oblast, Ukraine. It is part of the Toretsk urban hromada. The distance to Toretsk by local road is approximately 6 km.

On 19 May 2016, Artemove was renamed to Zalizne, conforming to the law prohibiting names of communist origin.

Population: 4,928 (2022 estimate), 6,725 (2001).

== History ==
Zalizne is known since 1894 as Nelepovsky Khutor. In July 1905, miners of the Nelepovsky Mine (later named the Artem Mine) organized a strike, involving over 100 miners. In April 1916, more than 5,000 workers went on strike at the Neliptyvskyi Mine. Soviet authority was established in 1917, and M.I. Dubovyi was elected as the head of the council of workers' deputies.

=== Russo-Ukrainian War ===
In 2024, as part of a renewed effort to capture Donetsk Oblast, the Russian Armed Forces advanced near Zalizne as well as other satellite settlements of the Toretsk urban area, as geolocated footage by DeepState confirmed. The ISW reported that central Zalizne had been reached by Russian forces on 13 July. Russia formally claimed to have taken the city on 19 August.

== Demographics ==
Native language as of the Ukrainian Census of 2001:

- Russian 82.82%
- Ukrainian 16.75%
- Belarusian 0.20%
- Armenian 0.11%

== Gallery ==
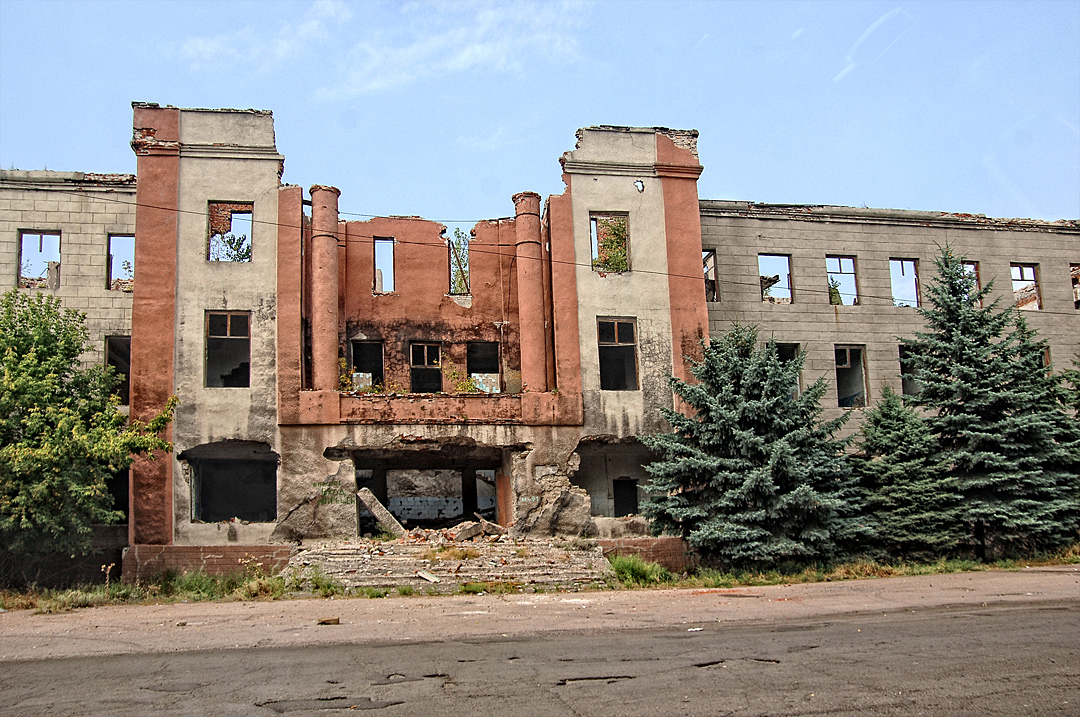
Defunct mine
