= Pivnichne, Donetsk Oblast =

Rural settlement in Donetsk Oblast, Ukraine

Pivnichne Північне
- Rural settlement
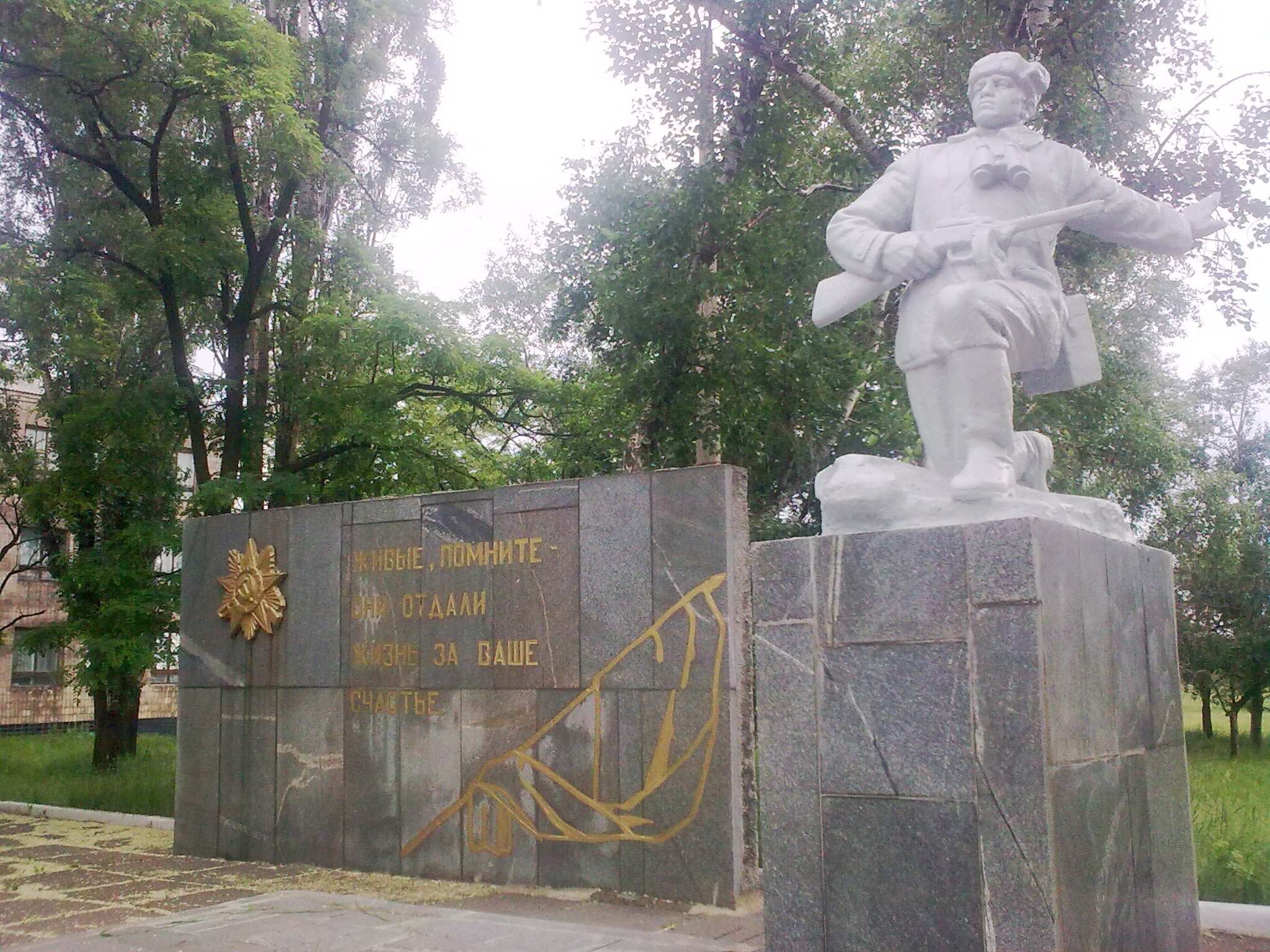
- Interactive map of Pivnichne
- Location of Pivnichne Pivnichne (Ukraine)
- Coordinates: 48°23′19″N 37°54′24″E
- Country: Ukraine
- Oblast: Donetsk Oblast
- Raion: Bakhmut Raion
- Hromada: Toretsk urban hromada

Area
  - Total: 7.15 km^{2} (2.76 sq mi)
- Elevation: 229 m (751 ft)

Population (2022)
  - Total: 9,024
  - Density: 1,260/km^{2} (3,270/sq mi)
- Time zone: UTC+2
  - Summer (DST): UTC+3
- Postal code: 85280-85284
- Area code: +380 6247

Pivnichne (Ukrainian: Північне; Russian: Пивничное), formerly Kirove (Ukrainian: Кірове; Russian: Кирово), is a rural settlement in Bakhmut Raion, Donetsk Oblast, eastern Ukraine. As of 2022, it had a population of 9,024 people.

== History ==
The settlement began in the late 18th century around the coal mining industry in the region, which was then part of the Russian Empire. In 1936, by which time it had entered into the Soviet Union, it received the name Kirove, after the Bolshevik leader Sergei Kirov. In 1938, it was designated an urban-type settlement.

During World War II, 186 people from Kirove died on the Eastern Front. From October 1941 to September 1942, Kirove was under the occupation of Nazi Germany.

=== Russo-Ukrainian war ===
In 2016, Kirove was renamed to Pivnichne, conforming to the law prohibiting names of Communist origin.

==== Russian invasion of Ukraine ====
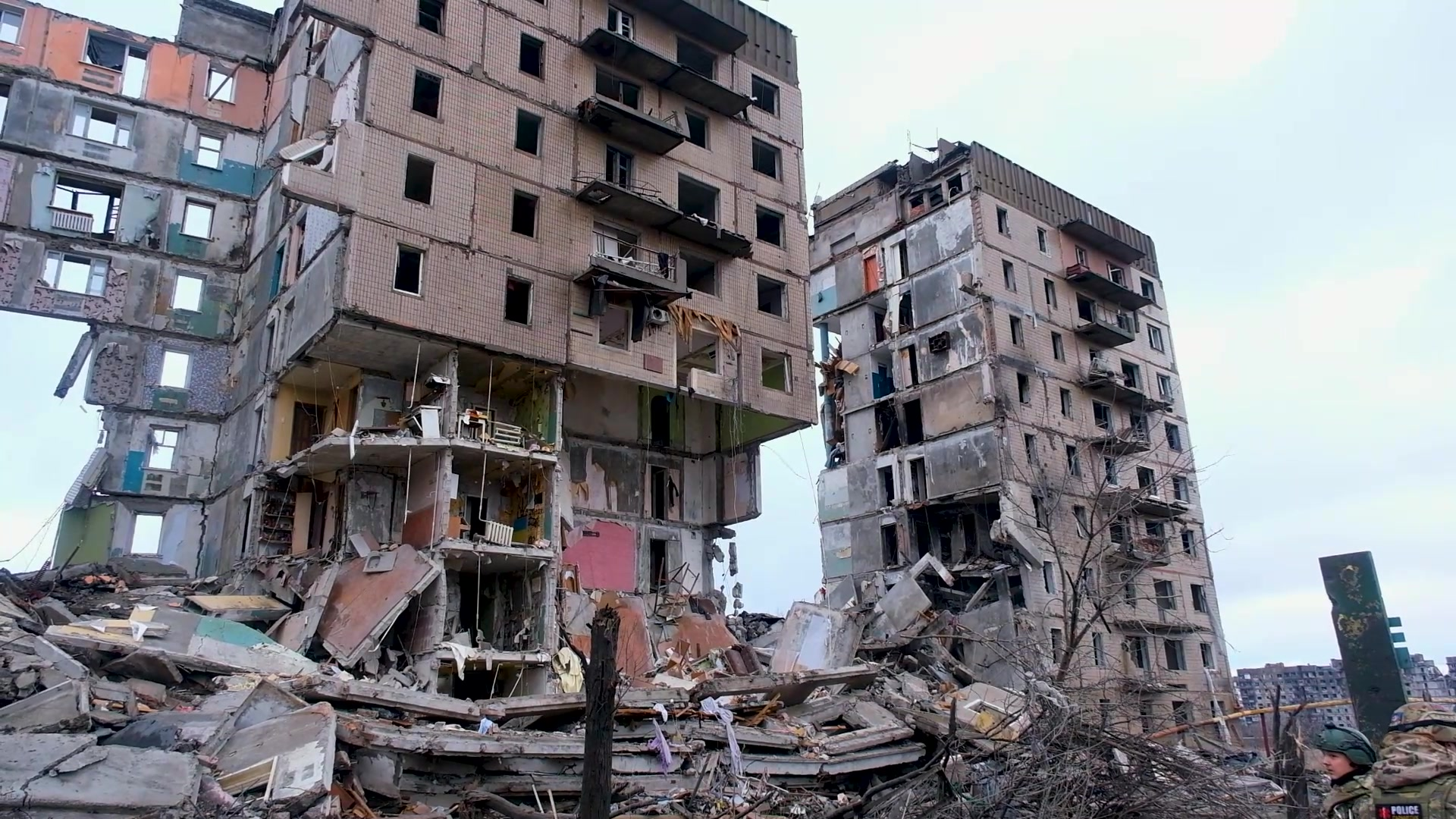
Residential building in Pivnichne after Russian strikes, December 2023

On 22 June 2024, the Russian Armed Forces gained a foothold within the settlement amid a renewed campaign to capture Donetsk Oblast, along with advances to other satellite settlements of the Toretsk urban hromada, as geolocated footage by DeepState confirmed.

== Demographics ==
Historical population
Year	Pop.	±%
1959	4,600	—
1970	13,000	+182.6%
1979	11,100	−14.6%
1999	9,800	−11.7%
2001	11,747	+19.9%
2022	9,024	−23.2%

As of the 2001 Ukrainian census, the settlement had a population of 11,747 people. Their native languages were:

- Ukrainian 8.39%
- Russian 91.37%
- Armenian 0.08%
- Belarusian 0.05%
- Bulgarian, Polish, Hungarian and Gagauz 0.01%

Significant populations of Ukrainian Orthodox Christians, Evangelical Christians, and Baptists all live in the region.
