= Krymske, Donetsk Oblast =

Krymske Кримське
- Rural settlement
- Interactive map of Krymske
- Location of Krymske within Ukraine Krymske (Ukraine)
- Coordinates: 48°24′26″N 37°51′42″E
- Country: Ukraine
- Oblast: Donetsk Oblast
- Raion: Bakhmut Raion
- Hromada: Toretsk urban hromada

Area
  - Total: 0.05 km^{2} (0.019 sq mi)
- Elevation: 196 m (643 ft)

Population (2001 census)
  - Total: 59
  - Density: 1,200/km^{2} (3,100/sq mi)
- Time zone: UTC+2 (EET)
  - Summer (DST): UTC+3 (EEST)
- Postal code: 85204
- KATOTTH: UA14020110160045619

Krymske (Ukrainian: Кримське; Russian: Крымское) is a Russian-occupied rural settlement in Donetsk Oblast, eastern Ukraine, at about 57 kilometres (35 mi) northeast from Donetsk city and 2.5 kilometres (1.6 mi) northeast from Toretsk.

The settlement was crucial to the full capture of Toretsk during the battle of Toretsk in the Russian invasion of Ukraine. On 1 February 2025, Liveuamap announced that the settlement had been captured by the Russian forces which had consequently advanced outside of it as well.

== History ==
The War in Donbas, that started in mid-April 2014, has brought along both civilian and military casualties.

=== Russian invasion of Ukraine ===
The village was attacked by Russian forces in January 2025, during the full-scale Russian invasion of Ukraine. Russian forces claimed to have taken the village and the areas around it on 1 February 2025, which effectively ended the Battle of Toretsk culminating in a Russian victory.

== Demographics ==
In 2001 the settlement had 59 inhabitants. Native language as of the Ukrainian Census of 2001:

- Ukrainian – 20.34%
- Russian – 79.66%
