= Shumi =

Shumi may refer to:

- "Shumi Maritsa", Bulgarian national anthem
- Shumishi, or shumi, official title in imperial China
- Genzeb Shumi (born 1991), Ethiopian-born middle distance runner
- Shumi Dechasa (born 1989), Ethiopian-born Bahraini long distance runner
- The Russian-language name of Shumy, a rural settlement in eastern Ukraine
