= Dachne, Bakhmut Raion =

Dachne Дачне
- Rural settlement
- Interactive map of Dachne
- Location within Donetsk Oblast Location within Ukraine
- Coordinates: 48°25′21″N 37°52′46″E
- Country: Ukraine
- Oblast: Donetsk Oblast
- Raion: Bakhmut Raion
- Hromada: Toretsk urban hromada
- Elevation: 175 m (574 ft)

Population
  - Total: 70
- Postal code: 85204
- Area code: +380-6247

Dachne (Ukrainian: Дачне) is a rural settlement in Bakhmut Raion, Donetsk Oblast, eastern Ukraine. Administratively, it is part of Toretsk urban hromada, one of the hromadas of Ukraine.

== History ==
On 22 July 2022, during the Russian invasion of Ukraine, Russian troops struck the settlement, destroying multiple houses.

In May 2025, Russian forces claimed to have captured the settlement. It was confirmed that Russia captured the settlement on June 1, 2025.

== See also ==
- List of villages in Donetsk Oblast
