= HKmap.live =

Hong Kong live web mapping service

- The website viewed from a desktop on 12 October 2019.
- Website type: Web mapping
- Available in: Traditional Chinese
- Website: hkmap.live
- Registration: None
- Current status: Server Unresponsive

HKmap.live was a web mapping service which crowdsources and tracks the location of protesters and police in Hong Kong. The service was launched during the 2019–2020 Hong Kong protests and gathers reports on police patrols and tear gas deployments via Telegram. The service was available for smartphone users in an Android version via the Google Play Store and in a World Wide Web version, while the iOS smartphone version was removed by Apple.

== Development and operation ==
The service was launched in August 2019 by LIHKG member 5YH; according to the developer, the website had more than ten thousand unique visitors on the first day. It gathers reports from instant messaging service Telegram on police patrols and tear gas deployments. The service allows users to track police activity on Hong Kong streets, providing ongoing information on police movements via messages and GPS locations. This allows citizens to move away from areas where police action may take place, and notify others of actions that may be taken in different places.

The service was available in an Android version via the Google Play Store and in a web version, while the iOS version was removed by Apple.

== iOS app ==
=== Initial rejection and approval ===
The iOS version of HKmap.live was initially submitted to Apple Inc. on 21 September 2019 and was rejected from its App Store five days later on an issue regarding payment options. The app's developer fixed the issue and re-submitted the application, though Apple again rejected the app on 2 October. According to the company, the rejection was because it "facilitates, enables, or encourages an activity that is not legal" and that it "allowed users to evade law enforcement". In response, the developer said that they believed the rejection was caused by a bureaucratic error rather than censorship, stating that the app was built to "show events happening" in Hong Kong and that they "do not encourage illegal activity". They also argued that the rejection was unfair because other apps such as Waze help drivers avoid traffic cameras and police, adding that Apple was assuming that HKmap.live users would break the law. Apple reversed its decision on 4 October and the app was made available on the App Store a day later.

=== Removal ===
In an editorial published on 8 October, the People's Daily, the official mouthpiece of the Central Committee of the Chinese Communist Party, argued that Apple endorsed and protected "rioters" in the 2019–2020 Hong Kong protests by listing the app on its App Store. The article, which did not specifically name the app, suggested that Apple approving of the app after initial rejection made it an accomplice (Chinese: 帮凶) for the protesters, allowing "Hong Kong rioters to openly commit crime while openly escaping arrests". The article also criticised Apple for listing the protest anthem "Glory to Hong Kong", frequently sung in the protests, on its Hong Kong music store, though it did not directly name the song. Verna Yu of The Guardian described this condemnation as an attempt by China to force foreign companies to conform to its views, comparing it to a recent incident where state broadcaster China Central Television and Chinese companies cancelled collaboration with the National Basketball Association after Houston Rockets general manager Daryl Morey tweeted in support of the Hong Kong protests.

Apple removed the app the next day. In its statement, Apple said that the app violated their guidelines and local laws, stating that it "has been used to target and ambush police" and "threaten public safety" according to information provided by the Cyber Security and Technology Crime Bureau (CSTCB), part of the Hong Kong Police Force. Jack Nicas of The New York Times noted that like other companies, Apple had to balance between maintaining access to the Chinese market with the "negative public image of capitulating" to its government, though argued that Apple had more at stake in China than other multinational companies with most of its product assembly in China and its reliance on the Chinese market. The developer criticised Apple's decision on Thursday, saying on Twitter that it does not "solicit, promote, or encourage criminal activity." It also argued that there was no evidence to support the CSTCB's claim that the app has been used to target or ambush police, or that it threatened public safety. Users who had already downloaded the app can still use it after it was removed. Before it was removed, the iOS app was the most downloaded app under the Travel category in Apple's Hong Kong App Store.

=== Responses ===
Joint letter from U.S. Senators and Representatives to Apple regarding the removal

In an internal email written to all Apple employees, CEO Tim Cook defended the company's decision to remove the app, saying that it was "being used maliciously to target individual officers for violence and to victimize individuals and property where no police are present." However, Cook's claims have been disputed by international observers in Hong Kong, who stated that individual violations as described do not match up with what the service displays. Charles Mok, a Professional Commons member of the Legislative Council of Hong Kong, said in a letter to Cook that he was "deeply disappointed" by Apple's decision to remove the app, stating that the service helps Hong Kong residents avoid areas where pedestrians may be subjected to police brutality and excessive force by the police during crowd dispersal operations. Maciej Cegłowski, a software developer and activist who was in Hong Kong during the protests, said that the claim that the app violated the law was similarly unsupported, saying that neither Cook nor Apple pointed out which law the app violated. Cegłowski also thought that double standards were in play, comparing the app to Waze, which similarly allows tracking of law enforcement but is still available on the iOS platform. When asked about Apple removing the app specifically, Geng Shuang, a spokesman for China's Ministry of Foreign Affairs, reiterated the Chinese government's stance, describing the protests as "extreme, violent acts, challenging Hong Kong's rule of law and order, threatening the safety of Hong Kong's people" that should be opposed.

In an 18 October letter addressed to Tim Cook, US Senators Ron Wyden, Tom Cotton, Marco Rubio and Ted Cruz, and Representatives Alexandria Ocasio-Cortez, Mike Gallagher and Tom Malinowski expressed "strong concern" over Apple's decision to remove the app. The letter stated that such examples cause "concern about whether Apple and other large US corporate entities will bow to growing Chinese demands rather than lose access to a billion Chinese consumers." The letter was seen as a rare example of bipartisanship in the US Congress, because Cruz and Ocasio-Cortez, two signatories to the letter, are typically seen as being on opposite sides of the American political spectrum.

== See also ==
- Live Universal Awareness Map
