= Shumy =

Shumy Шуми
- Interactive map of Shumy
- Location of Shumy within Ukraine Shumy (Donetsk Oblast)
- Coordinates: 48°22′51″N 37°56′1″E
- Country: Ukraine
- Oblast: Donetsk Oblast
- Raion: Bakhmut Raion
- Hromada: Toretsk urban hromada

Population (2001 census)
  - Total: 95
- Time zone: UTC+2 (EET)
  - Summer (DST): UTC+3 (EEST)
- Postal code: 85280
- Area code: +380 6247

Shumy (Ukrainian: Шуми; Russian: Шумы, romanized: Shumi) is a settlement in the administrative area of the city council of Toretsk in Donetsk Oblast of eastern Ukraine, at 57.4 km NNW from the centre of Donetsk city. It is considered a suburb of Horlivka.

== History ==
=== Russo-Ukrainian War ===
==== War in Donbas ====
The War in Donbas, which started in mid-April 2014, has brought along both civilian and military casualties. Initially, Shumy was under the control of the separatist Donetsk People's Republic, but in the summer of 2018, the Ukrainian army took control of the village. Control of Shumy is considered a military strategic advantage. The village is located on the frontline near separatist-held Horlivka.

==== Russian invasion of Ukraine ====
During the Prelude to the Russian invasion of Ukraine, Russian troops fired mortars at Ukrainian positions near the village on 26 March 2021, killing four Ukrainian servicemen. During the full-scale Russian invasion of Ukraine, Ukraine retained control over the settlement until 21 June 2024, when Russia recaptured it. The frontline around the settlement was the last pre-invasion frontline in which there were significant territorial changes, specifically 848 days after 24 February 2022.

As part of a renewed effort to capture Donetsk Oblast, the Russian Armed Forces captured Shumy on 21 June 2024 and advanced into other satellite settlements of Toretsk in early July, as geolocated footage by DeepState confirmed.

== Demographics ==
Native language as of the Ukrainian Census of 2001:

- Russian 84.21%
- Ukrainian 15.79%
