= Valentynivka, Donetsk Oblast =

Valentynivka Валентинівка
- Rural settlement
- Location within Donetsk Oblast Location within Ukraine
- Coordinates: 48°18′38″N 37°45′44″E
- Country: Ukraine
- Oblast: Donetsk Oblast
- Raion: Bakhmut Raion
- Hromada: Toretsk urban hromada
- Elevation: 151 m (495 ft)

Population
  - Total: 84
- Postal code: 85299
- Area code: +380-6247

Valentynivka (Ukrainian: Валентинівка) is a rural settlement in Bakhmut Raion, Donetsk Oblast, eastern Ukraine. Administratively, it is part of Toretsk urban hromada, one of the hromadas of Ukraine.

== History ==
On 26 July 2023, during the Russian invasion of Ukraine, children were evacuated from the settlement.

== See also ==
- List of villages in Donetsk Oblast
