= Toretsk urban hromada =

Toretsk urban hromada Торецька міська громада
- Hromada
- Interactive map of Toretsk urban hromada
- Country: Ukraine
- Oblast: Donetsk
- Raion: Bakhmut

Area
  - Total: 67.5 km^{2} (26.1 sq mi)

Population (2020)
  - Total: 66,369
  - Density: 983/km^{2} (2,550/sq mi)
- Settlements: 19
- Cities: 2
- Rural settlements: 15
- Villages: 2

Toretsk urban hromada (Ukrainian: Торецька міська громада) is a hromada of Ukraine, located in Bakhmut Raion, Donetsk Oblast. Its administrative center is the city Toretsk.

It has an area of 67.5 square kilometres (26.1 mi^{2}) and a population of 66,369, as of 2020.

The hromada contains 19 settlements: 2 cities (Toretsk and Zalizne), 2 villages (Leonidivka and Yuriivka), and 15 rural settlements:

- Kurdiumivka
- Nelipivka
- New York
- Petrivka
- Pivdenne
- Pivnichne
- Shcherbynivka
- Valentynivka
- Dachne
- Dyliivka
- Druzhba
- Krymske
- Ozarianivka
- Sukha Balka
- Shumy

== See also ==
- List of hromadas of Ukraine
