= Khyzhak Brigade (Ukraine) =

- Ukrainian: Бригада Хижак
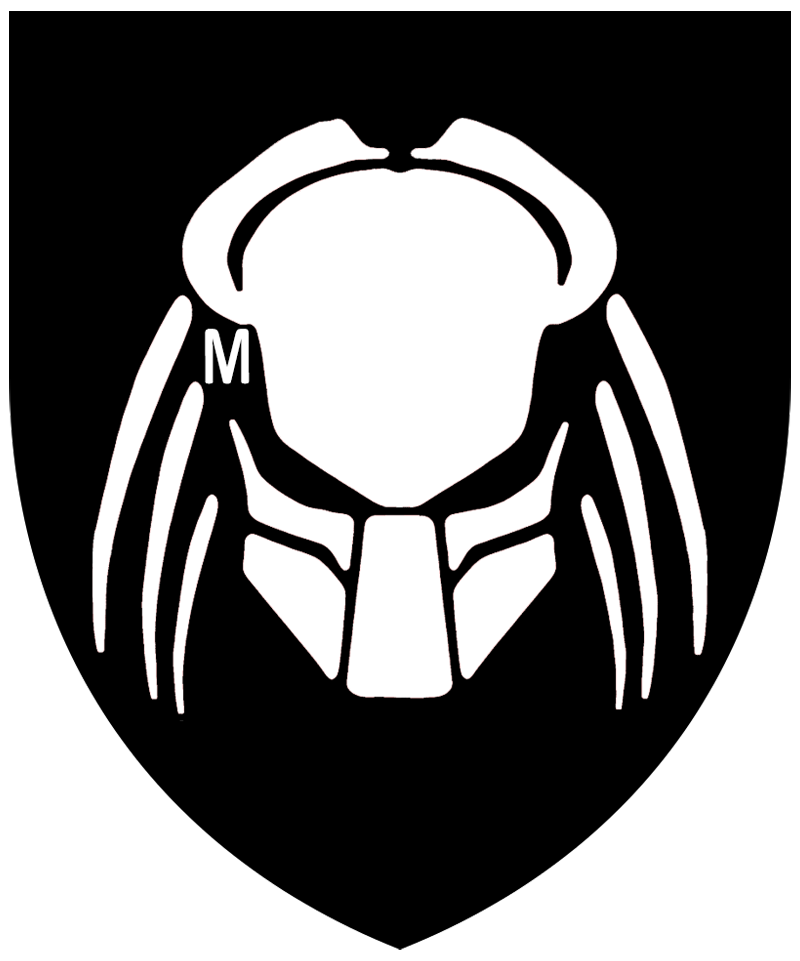
- Khyzhak Brigade Insignia
- Active: 2022–present
- Country: Ukraine
- Branch: Ministry of Internal Affairs
- Type: National Police of Ukraine
- Garrison/HQ: Kyiv
- Nickname: The Predators
- Patron: Yautja clan
- Mascot: Predator
- Engagements: Russo-Ukrainian War; Russian invasion of Ukraine; Southern Ukraine campaign; Battle of Mykolaiv; 2022 Kherson counteroffensive; Battle of Snihurivka; Battle of Bashtanka; 2023 Ukrainian counteroffensive; Northern Ukraine campaign; Battle of Sumy; Eastern Ukraine campaign; 2022 Kharkiv counteroffensive; Battle of Lyman; Battle of Bakhmut; Battle of Chasiv Yar; Battle of Toretsk

Insignia
- Flag

The Khyzhak Brigade (Ukrainian: Хижак, lit. 'Predator') is a Brigade of the Patrol Police of Ukraine. It was established in 2022 following the Russian invasion of Ukraine as a detachment which became a brigade on 25 June 2024. It has seen extensive combat during the Russo-Ukrainian war.

== History ==
The Khyzhak Brigade is a combined rifle brigade of the Patrol Police of Ukraine established following the Russian invasion of Ukraine. It was officially created on 1 March 2022 for the support of Ukrainian forces in the Russo-Ukrainian war. The Brigade took part in the Battle of Mykolaiv, battles of Snihurivka and Bashtanka, crossed the Inhulets during the 2022 Kherson counteroffensive and also took part in the Battle of Bakhmut and the 2023 Ukrainian counteroffensive. During the 2023 Ukrainian counteroffensive, near Robotyne on 16 August 2023, a Russian tank attacked the positions of the brigade leaving only one survivor and multiple fatalities (including Artur Chornomorets), the survivor was also extremely wounded and captured by Russian forces. In March 2024, Khyzhak with support from the 63rd Mechanized Brigade destroyed a Russian T-90 in the area of Lyman. On 25 June 2024, the detachment officially became a rifle brigade, which has its own infantry, medical, reconnaissance, mortar and support companies. The brigade adopted an insignia showcasing the Predator from the Predator Franchise. In late June 2024, it was deployed to fight in the Battle of Chasiv Yar. The brigade also saw deployment in the Battle of Lyman, Battle of Sumy and in the Serebryansky forest. In Serebryansky forest, they operated in the tunnels at the distance of 3km from Russian positions, the FPV UAVs of the brigade hit a Solntsepok heavy flamethrower system which was them destroyed by the infantry of the brigade. They also destroyed a T-90 on 29 February 2024 and several Mortar positions. During the Battle of Chasiv Yar, they endured severe shelling during severe weather conditions. The personnel of the brigade were also awarded for their actions in Donetsk Oblast. The brigade also adopted a large number of stray animals. In October 2024, it was deployed and saw heavy combat during the Battle of Toretsk protecting the flanks and the centre and also the approach to Kostyantynivka. Even in the dugout, safety is quite relative. Russian forces attacked the positions of the brigade using shells, rockets, anti-aircraft missiles and even cluster bombs. The Khyzhak brigade's artillerymen operating D-30 howitzers bombarded Russian infantry at the night in the city center. The Russian forces also used Anti-aircraft weaponry against positions of the brigade during the Battle of Toretsk. On 18 November 2024, the Khyzhak Brigade claimed that it had killed two "North Korean mercenaries" in Kursk Oblast.

== See also ==
- Liut Brigade
- KORD Brigade
