= Leonidovka, Tuymazinsky District, Republic of Bashkortostan =

Leonidovka Леонидовка
- Selo
- Location within Bashkortostan Location within Russia
- Coordinates: 54°23′N 53°32′E
- Country: Russia
- Region: Bashkortostan
- District: Tuymazinsky District
- Time zone: UTC+5:00

Leonidovka (Russian: Леонидовка) is a rural locality (a selo) in Karatovsky Selsoviet, Tuymazinsky District, Bashkortostan, Russia. The population was 25 as of 2010. There are 3 streets.

== Geography ==
Leonidovka is located 36 km southwest of Tuymazy (the district's administrative centre) by road. Imangulovo is the nearest rural locality.
