= Shcherbynivka =

Urban locality in Donetsk Oblast, Ukraine

Shcherbynivka Щербинівка
- Rural settlement
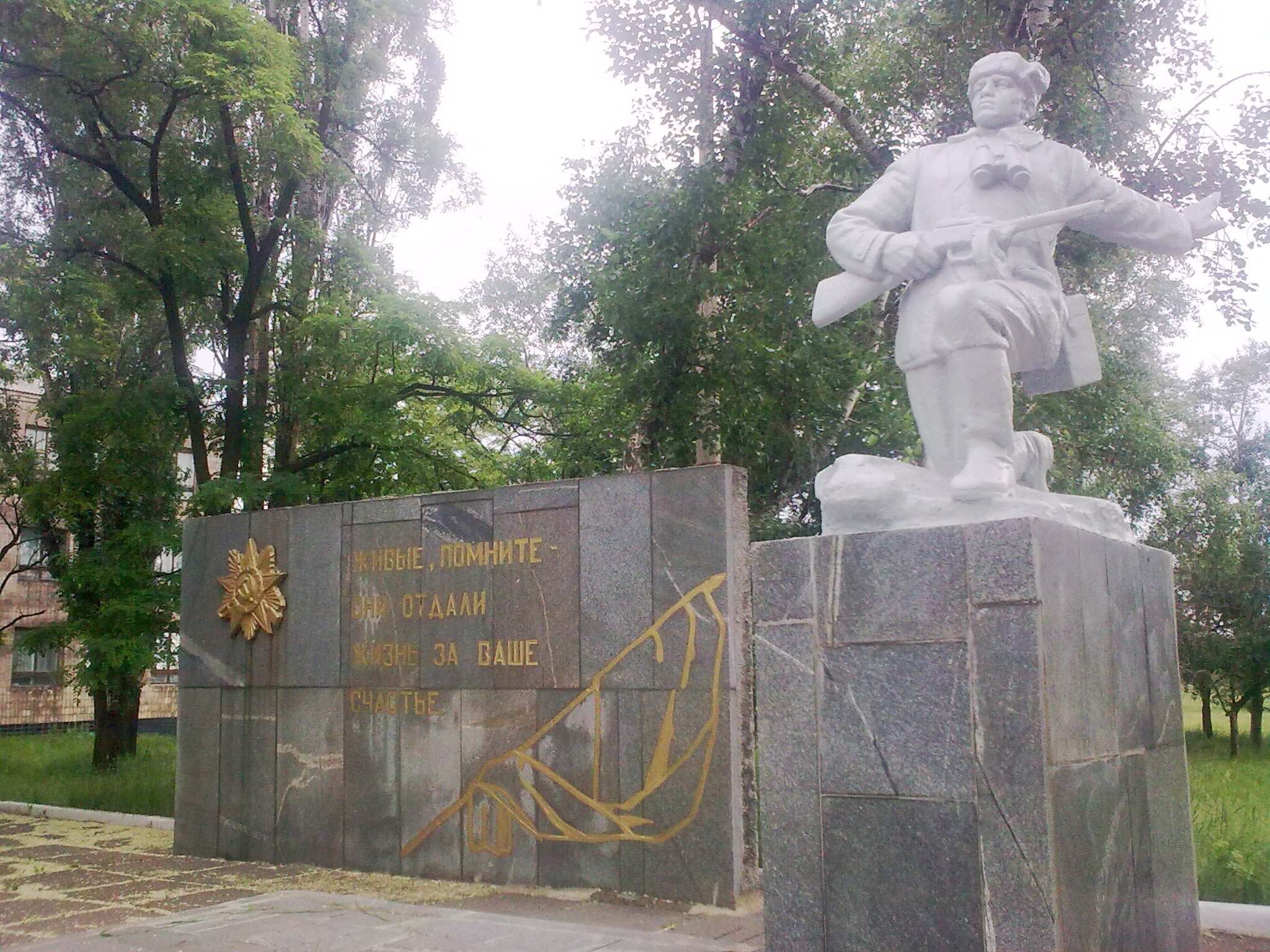

- Location of Shcherbynivka Shcherbynivka (Ukraine)
- Coordinates: 48°23′10″N 37°47′41″E
- Country: Ukraine
- Oblast: Donetsk Oblast
- Raion: Bakhmut Raion
- Hromada: Toretsk urban hromada
- Elevation: 111 m (364 ft)

Population (2022)
  - Total: 3,266
- Time zone: UTC+2
  - Summer (DST): UTC+3
- Postal code: 85150
- Area code: +380 6272

Shcherbynivka (Ukrainian: Щербинівка) is a rural settlement in Bakhmut Raion, Donetsk Oblast, eastern Ukraine. Population: 3,266 (2022 estimate). The settlement is under complete Russian control, as of 23 August 2025.

== History ==
=== Russian Invasion of Ukraine ===
On 13 August 2024, Russian troops struck the settlement with artillery and injured 2 people.

== Demographics ==
Native language as of the Ukrainian Census of 2001:

- Ukrainian 91.24%
- Russian 8.62%
- Moldovan (Romanian) 0.05%
- Belarusian 0.02%
