= Yuriivka, Bakhmut Raion, Donetsk Oblast =

Yuriivka Юріївка
- Village
- Location within Donetsk Oblast Location within Ukraine
- Coordinates: 48°18′50″N 37°49′57″E
- Country: Ukraine
- Oblast: Donetsk Oblast
- Raion: Bakhmut Raion
- Hromada: Toretsk urban hromada

Population
  - Total: 32
- Postal code: 85296
- Area code: +380-6247

Yuriivka (Ukrainian: Юріївка), formerly Yurivka (Юр'ївка), is a village in Toretsk urban hromada, Bakhmut Raion, Donetsk Oblast, Ukraine.

== History ==
On 26 July 2023, during the Russian invasion of Ukraine, children were evacuated from the village.

On 18 June 2025, the Verkhovna Rada renamed the village to Yuriivka to match Ukrainian language standards.

== See also ==
- List of villages in Donetsk Oblast
