= Leonidivka, Donetsk Oblast =

Leonidivka Леонідівка
- Village
- Location within Donetsk Oblast Location within Ukraine
- Coordinates: 48°22′14″N 37°48′4″E
- Country: Ukraine
- Oblast: Donetsk Oblast
- Raion: Bakhmut Raion
- Hromada: Toretsk urban hromada
- Elevation: 103 m (338 ft)

Population
  - Total: 115
- Postal code: 85295
- Area code: +380-6247

Leonidivka (Ukrainian: Леонідівка) is a village located in Bakhmut Raion, Donetsk Oblast, eastern Ukraine. Administratively, it is part of Toretsk urban hromada. It is approximately 41 km (135,000 ft) north of Donetsk.

== History ==
On 11 October 2018, during the War in Donbas, an OSCE Special Monitoring Mission patrol drone recorded an armored reconnaissance vehicle close to the village.

On 21 September 2024, as part of the Russian invasion of Ukraine and the battle of Toretsk, Russian forces entered the village. On 3 November 2024, the Russian forces captured the village.

== See also ==
- List of villages in Donetsk Oblast
