= Nelipivka =

Urban locality in Donetsk Oblast, Ukraine

Nelipivka Неліпівка
- Rural settlement
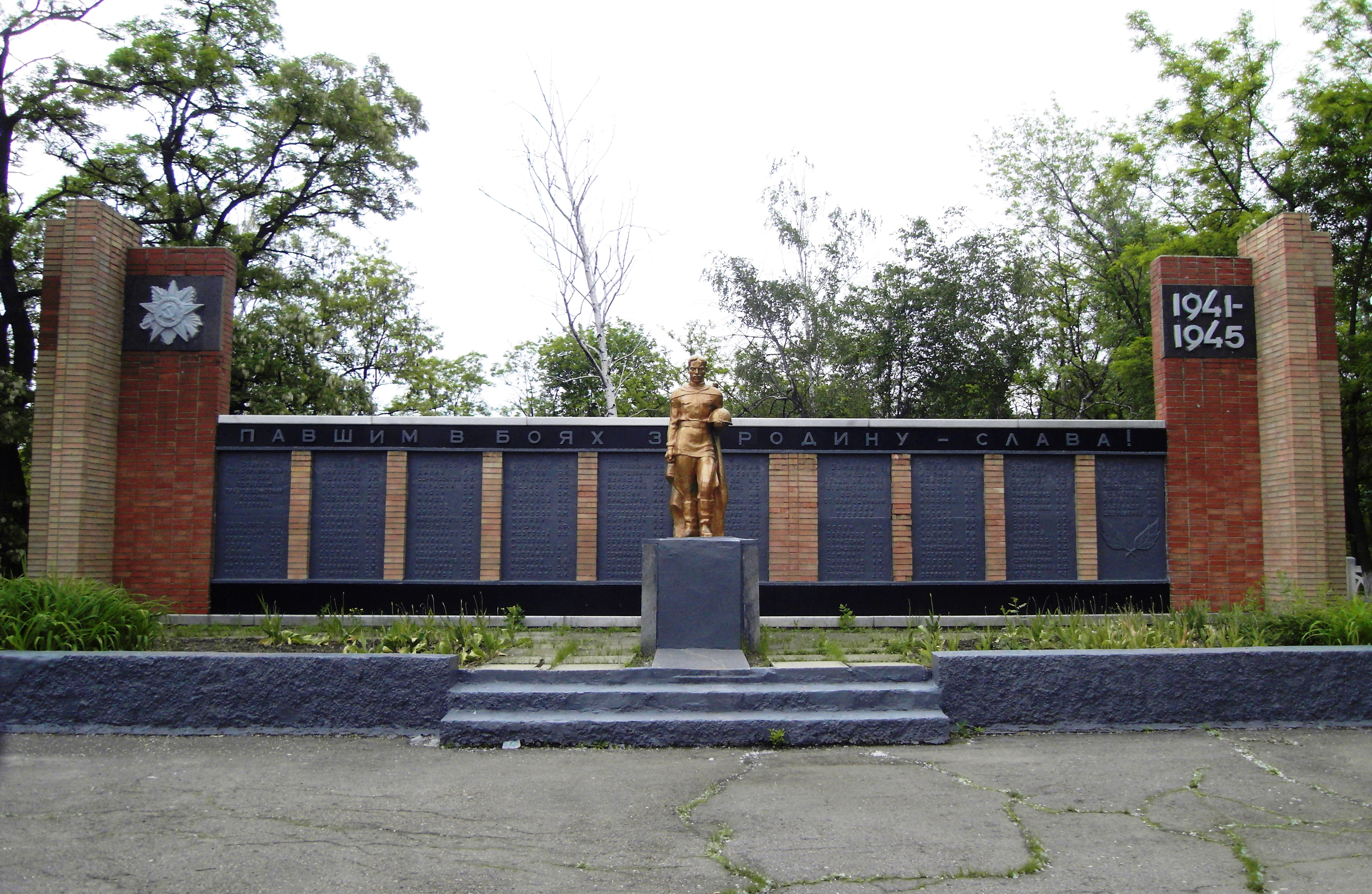
- Interactive map of Nelipivka
- Location of Nelipivka Nelipivka (Ukraine)
- Coordinates: 48°21′20″N 37°49′57″E
- Country: Ukraine
- Oblast: Donetsk Oblast
- Raion: Bakhmut Raion
- Hromada: Toretsk urban hromada
- Elevation: 90 m (300 ft)

Population (2019)
  - Total: 977
- Time zone: UTC+2
  - Summer (DST): UTC+3
- Postal code: 85298
- Area code: +380 6247

Nelipivka (Ukrainian: Неліпівка; Russian: Нелеповка, romanized: Nelepovka) is a rural settlement in Bakhmut Raion, Donetsk Oblast, eastern Ukraine. Population: 977 (2022 estimate).

During the Russian invasion of Ukraine, Russian forces claimed to have taken the village on 30 September 2024. They were confirmed to have captured it on 18 October.

== Demographics ==
Native language as of the Ukrainian Census of 2001:

- Ukrainian 81.99%
- Russian 17.16%
- Belarusian 0.70%
