= Leonidovka, Chishminsky District, Republic of Bashkortostan =

Leonidovka Леонидовка
- Village
- Location within Bashkortostan Location within Russia
- Coordinates: 54°43′N 55°14′E
- Country: Russia
- Region: Bashkortostan
- District: Chishminsky District
- Time zone: UTC+5:00

Leonidovka (Russian: Леонидовка) is a rural locality (a village) in Arslanovsky Selsoviet, Chishminsky District, Bashkortostan, Russia. The village has 2 streets and, as of 2010, a population of 48.

== Geography ==
Leonidovka is located 25 km northwest of Chishmy, the district's administrative seat. Aminevo is the nearest rural locality.
