= Novospaske, Bakhmut Raion, Donetsk Oblast =

Rural settlement in Donetsk Oblast, Ukraine

Novospaske Новоспаське
- Rural settlement
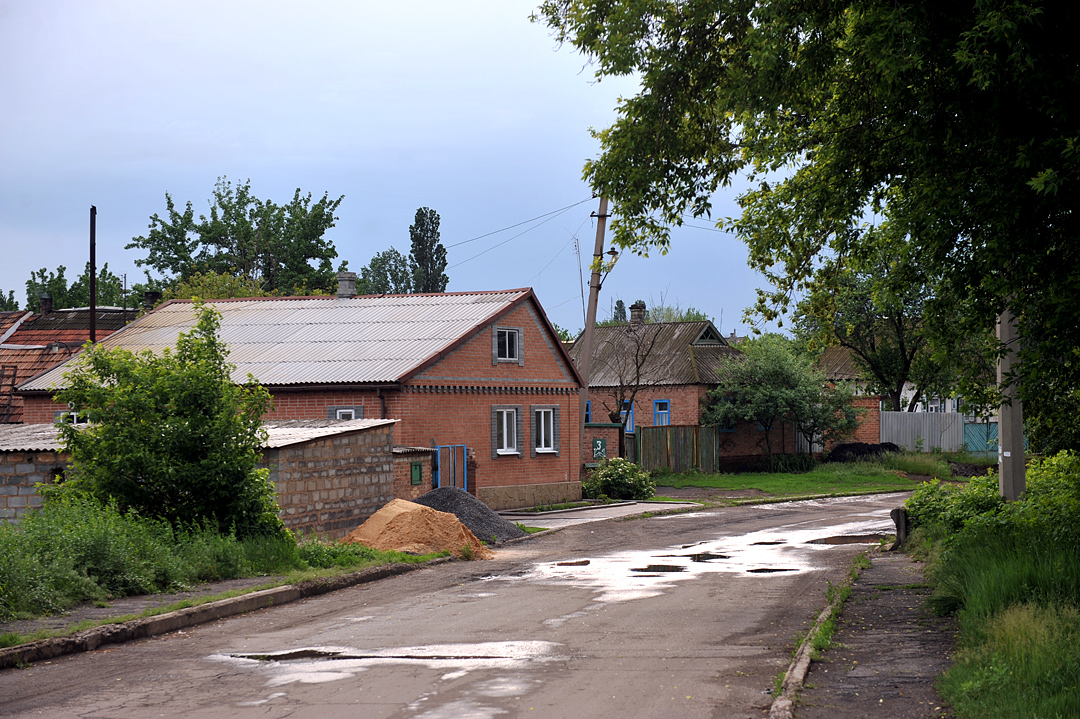

- Location of Petrivka Novospaske (Ukraine)
- Coordinates: 48°23′12″N 37°46′47″E
- Country: Ukraine
- Oblast: Donetsk Oblast
- Raion: Bakhmut Raion
- Elevation: 118 m (387 ft)

Population (2022)
  - Total: 1,009
- Time zone: UTC+2
  - Summer (DST): UTC+3
- Postal code: 85150
- Area code: +380 6272

Novospaske (Ukrainian: Новоспаське), formerly known as Petrivka, is a rural settlement in Bakhmut Raion, Donetsk Oblast, eastern Ukraine.

== History ==
On 19 September 2024, the Verkhovna Rada voted to rename the village to Novospaske.

=== Russian invasion of Ukraine ===
The settlement has been under Russian control since 14 July 2025.

== Demographics ==
As of 2022, the population was estimated to be 1,009 people.

The distribution of reported native languages as of the Ukrainian Census of 2001:

- Ukrainian 95.15%
- Russian 4.61%
- Belarusian and Moldovan (Romanian) 0.08%
