= Liveuamap =

Web mapping service

Live Universal Awareness Map, commonly known as Liveuamap, is an internet service to monitor and indicate activities on online geographic maps, particularly of locations with ongoing armed conflicts. It was developed by Rodion Rozhkovskiy and Oleksandr Bilchenko, two Ukrainian software engineers from Dnipro.

== Creation and name ==
The two founders of Liveuamap, Rodion Rozhkovskiy and Oleksandr Bilchenko, initially experimented independently with algorithms to filter and correlate social media information related to distinct geographic locations of interest. Together, they started the website liveuamap.com on 18 February 2014 to monitor Russian activities in Ukraine. They were able to indicate in detail the operations that led to the annexation of Crimea by the Russian Federation using their web crawler. The "UA" letters in the "LiveUAmap" name were originally from the country code for Ukraine, before the "Universal Awareness" backronym was officially proposed by the creators.

== Publication method ==
Their system tracks authors of social media posts of interest by identifying their former posts, number of activities, whom they follow and applies filter techniques to extract relevant information. When an accumulation of correlated messages about an event occurring at a location passes thresholds defined by the algorithms, the situation is listed for human intervention. At least two Liveuamap members decide whether the information about the event is valid, to be used on the map or if further verification is needed. Followup information about the accepted events is used as feedback to improve the system. Liveuamap members use additional sources such as satellite pictures and official communications. Archives are accessible to track the evolution of a particular map.

== Role as an information source ==
Liveuamap has been used to track ongoing armed conflicts. The website has provided interactive maps for armed conflicts such as the Syrian civil war, the Yemeni civil war, the Russo-Ukrainian War, and the greater Arab–Israeli conflict (including the Gaza war and Israel–Hezbollah conflict). The website's interactive conflict maps have been used by organisations such as the United Nations, Médecins Sans Frontières, Neue Zürcher Zeitung and The Guardian as part of their respective coverage.

== See also ==
- HKmap.live
