= New York, Ukraine =

Urban locality in Donetsk Oblast, Ukraine

New York Нью-Йорк
- Rural settlement
- Niu-York

Ukrainian transcription(s)
  - National: Niu-York
  - ALA-LC: Nʹi͡u-Ĭork
  - BGN/PCGN: N'yu-York
  - Scholarly: Nʹju-Jork
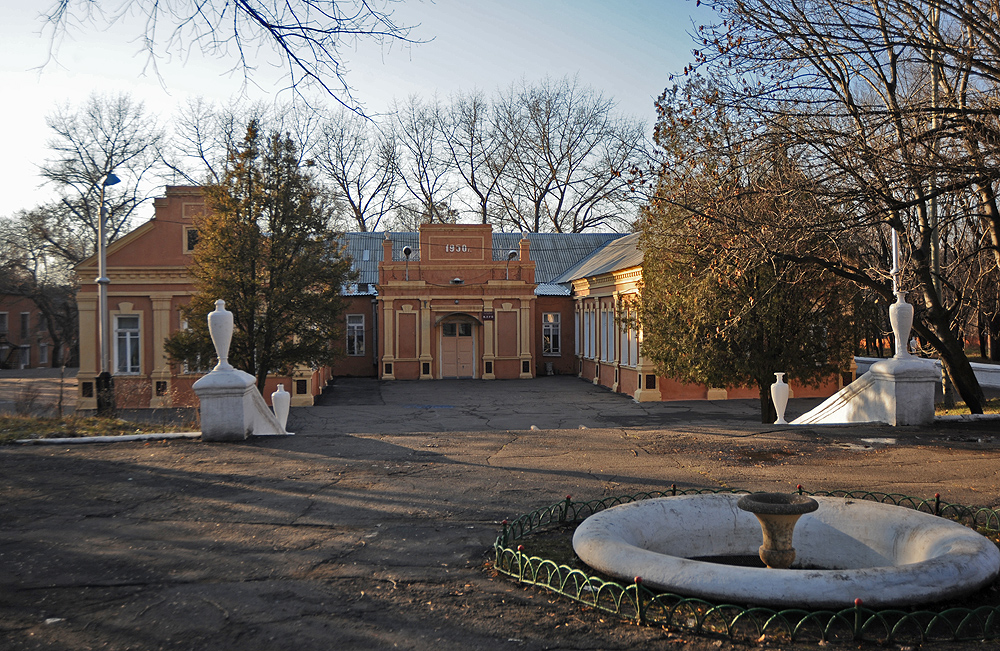
- The center of the settlement

- Coat of arms
- Interactive map of New York
- Coordinates: 48°19′55″N 37°50′11″E
- Country: Ukraine
- Oblast: Donetsk Oblast
- Raion: Bakhmut Raion
- Hromada: Toretsk urban hromada
- Founded: 1892

Government
  - Type: Toretsk City Council

Area
  - Total: 13.91 km^{2} (5.37 sq mi)
- Elevation: 106 m (348 ft)

Population (2022)
  - Total: 9,735
  - Density: 699.9/km^{2} (1,813/sq mi)
- Time zone: UTC+2 (EET)
  - Summer (DST): UTC+3 (EEST)
- Postal code: 85297
- Area code: +380 6247
- KOATUU code: 1411246500

New York or Niu-York (Note: Ukrainian: Нью-Йорк, IPA: [nʲjʊ ˈjɔrk] (according to the Resolution 55 of the Cabinet of Ministers of Ukraine, the letter ⟨ю⟩ in non-initial position is Romanized as iu – see also Romanization of Ukrainian); Russian: Нью-Йорк, romanized: N'yu-York.) is a rural settlement in Bakhmut Raion, Donetsk Oblast, Ukraine. It is located on the left-bank of the Kryvyi Torets River, about six kilometres (3.7 mi) south of Toretsk, and 38 kilometres (24 mi) north-northeast of Donetsk. From 1951 to 2021, the settlement was named Novhorodske. (Note: Ukrainian: Новгородське; Russian: Новгородское, romanized: Novgorodskoye.) The settlement has been under Russian occupation since the end of September 2024.

New York is administratively designated to Toretsk urban hromada, one of the hromadas of Ukraine with its center in the city of Toretsk, that is located about 10 kilometres (6.2 mi) north of New York. Population: 9,735 (2022 estimate).

== History ==
=== Pre-founding ===
At the end of the 18th century, Catherine the Great completed the Russian conquest of the region. She built new towns and founded the Novorossiya Governorate. Catherine and her successors invited German settlers, especially Mennonites, to develop the conquered lands. After the destruction of the Sich in 1775, Zaporozhian Cossacks and mercenaries from the Balkans also settled in the region in order to secure the steps of the empire. In the 1830s, Tsar Nicholas I donated a vast territory to the count Pavel Ignatiev. The way the region developed is not known.

=== Founding and name origin ===
The origin of the name of the town remains a mystery that is the subject of many local legends. It could have come from an entrepreneur or local dignitary, who would have settled from the United States or who would have had as a partner an American citizen from New York City. Another explanation refers to the city of Jork, in northern Germany, where Mennonite settlers have come from. The local historian Viktor Kovalov thus believes that the name of the locality may have corresponded to "Neu Jork" (new Jork) and evolved over time. It may also be the result of a transliteration error from the Latin alphabet to the Cyrillic alphabet. The establishment of the Mennonites officially dates back to 1889, however, whereas the name Niu-York predates it.

Another suggested etymology recalls that names with a famous evocation were frequent in the region in the 19th century. Historical maps show a "Swiss farm" near Druzhkivka or a hamlet called "Carthage" around Soledar. Also, historian Viktor Kovalov does not rule out the possibility of a joke.

New York first appeared on maps in 1846. The first official mention of the name of New York (Нью-Йорк) dates back to 1859 as one of the results of the census of the Yekaterinoslav Governorate, then part of the Russian Empire. The 1859 census confirmed that the locality then had 13 households, 45 men, 40 women, and a factory.

=== Development in the 19th and 20th century ===
In 1889, Mennonites from the colony of Chortitza (today Zaporizhzhia) acquired a piece of land and founded a factory. Named after its owner and chief engineer, Jakob Niebuhr, it was completed in 1894. In 1892, Mennonites formed the colony of New York from seven settlements. The industrialization of New York was accompanied by the construction of a north-south railway line. At the turn of the 20th century, the colony had electricity, a telegraph, a bank, a hotel, a bookstore, a school for girls and for boys.

In 1916, New York was chosen to host a new naphthalene production plant. Despite the revolution of February 1917, the factory came into operation in July 1917. In the context of rising tensions between the Soviet Union and Nazi Germany, the Mennonite German population was expelled to the Far East, where they founded the settlement Lugovoye. In 1938, New York received rural settlement status.

During World War II, New York was occupied by Nazi German forces from October 1941 until September 1943. The Petrovsk Machinery Plant (formerly Niebuhr) was transported and rebuilt in Soviet Kazakhstan. The phenol plant was moved to the Moscow region. The two factories were relocated back to New York after the conflict.

On 19 October 1951, in the context of the Cold War, an ukase (decree) of the Presidium of the Supreme Soviet of the Ukrainian Soviet Socialist Republic ordered the change of name to Novhorodske (literally translated as "of new city" and may also be seen as an adjective from "Novgorod"). During Soviet industrialization, industry developed in the settlement. The Dzerzhinsky phenol plant was completed and modernized, and the Novgorod Machine-Building Plant – named after Grigory Petrovsky – was built.

After the dissolution of the Soviet Union, workshops and other buildings were sold out; various production facilities were organized in some, others were mothballed; three workshops were dismantled for building materials.

=== Russo-Ukrainian War ===
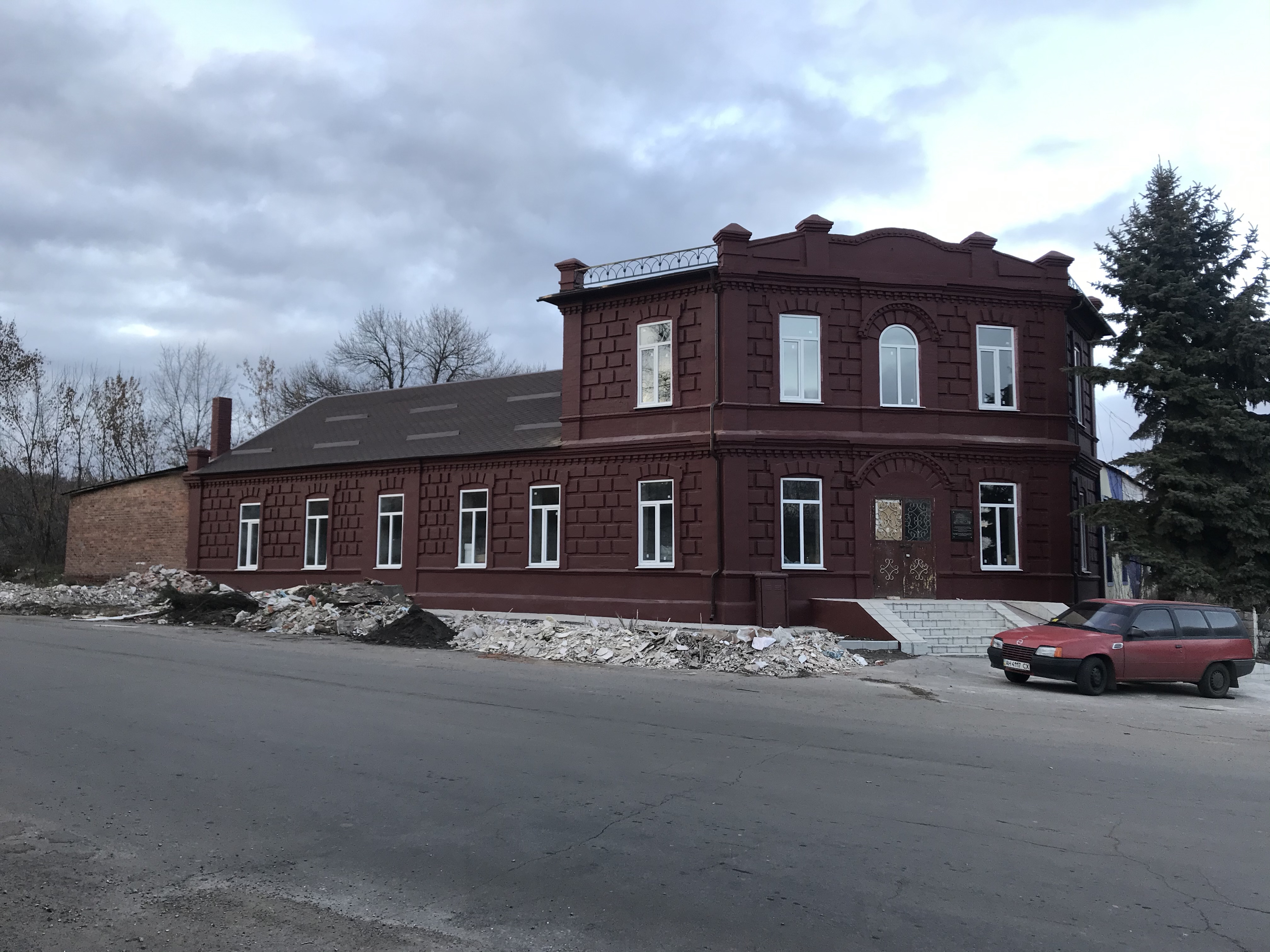
The German house under reconstruction in New York, Ukraine, in 2019

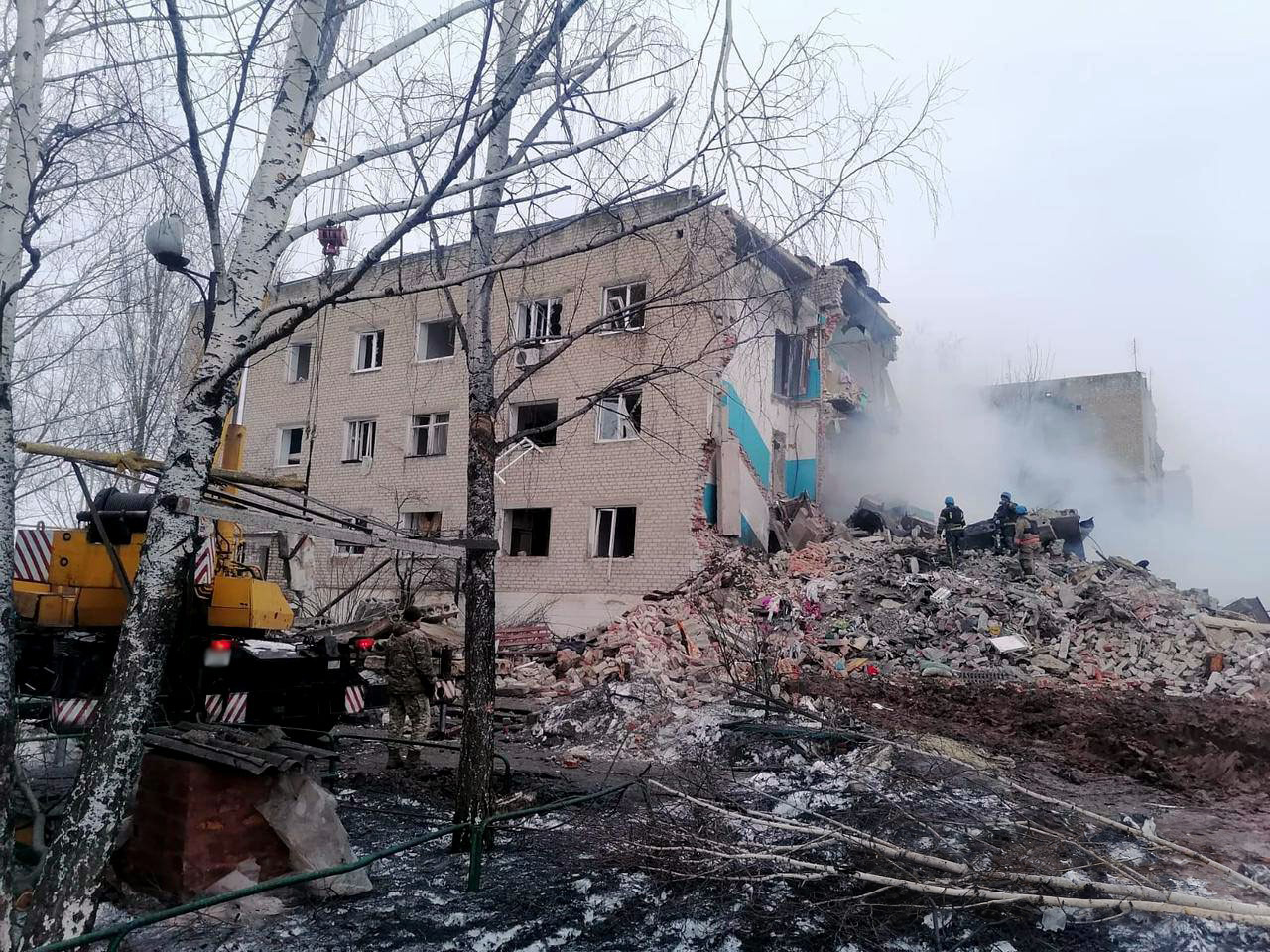
Residential building, destroyed by bombing on 15 January 2024

==== War in Donbas ====
As part of the war in Donbas, which began in mid-April 2014, the fighting caused civilian and military casualties. On 8 November 2016, a civilian was killed by shelling. According to Mykola Lenko, who was mayor, 16 residents lost their lives between 2014 and 2021.

In 2019, a former house of the German colony was restored and transformed into an exhibition, cultural and artistic hub.

In the wave of name changes required by the nationwide decommunization laws of 2015, the City Council validated the return to New York. The request to change the name to New York that was submitted by the civil-military administration of Donetsk Oblast was finally approved by the Committee of the Ukrainian parliament on the organization of state power, local self-government, regional development and urban planning on 3 February 2021. On 1 July, the Ukrainian parliament renamed the city.

The formal restoration of the city's name launched a wave of cultural events. On the initiative of the Ukrainian writer Victoria Amelina, whose husband had roots in the settlement, the first "Ukrainian New York literature festival" was held in October. The "New York marathon", inspired by the American event, brought together several dozens of participants at the beginning of November.

==== Russian invasion of Ukraine ====
As part of the Russian invasion of Ukraine, the phenol factory was bombed on 5 April 2022. Many inhabitants were evacuated. Another bombing of the plant occurred on 16 June 2023. The city was again hit by missiles on 18 March 2023, and 15 January 2024.

As part of an offensive to capture Toretsk, Russian troops entered New York on 3 July 2024 and advanced inside its southern area, reaching the central portion of the settlement the following day. At the same time, Russia advanced in other nearby satellite settlements of Toretsk. On 18 August, Russian sources claimed that the town had been completely captured, which the Russian defence ministry formally claimed on 20 August. The Economist said that the capture of New York showed that Russia was "slowly solidifying its position in Donetsk".

However, the situation in New York improved for Ukraine by 6 September when the Azov Brigade was able to successfully break out of the encirclement of their remaining territory held in the city. Despite this, Russian forces were able to capture New York by the end of September.

== Economy ==
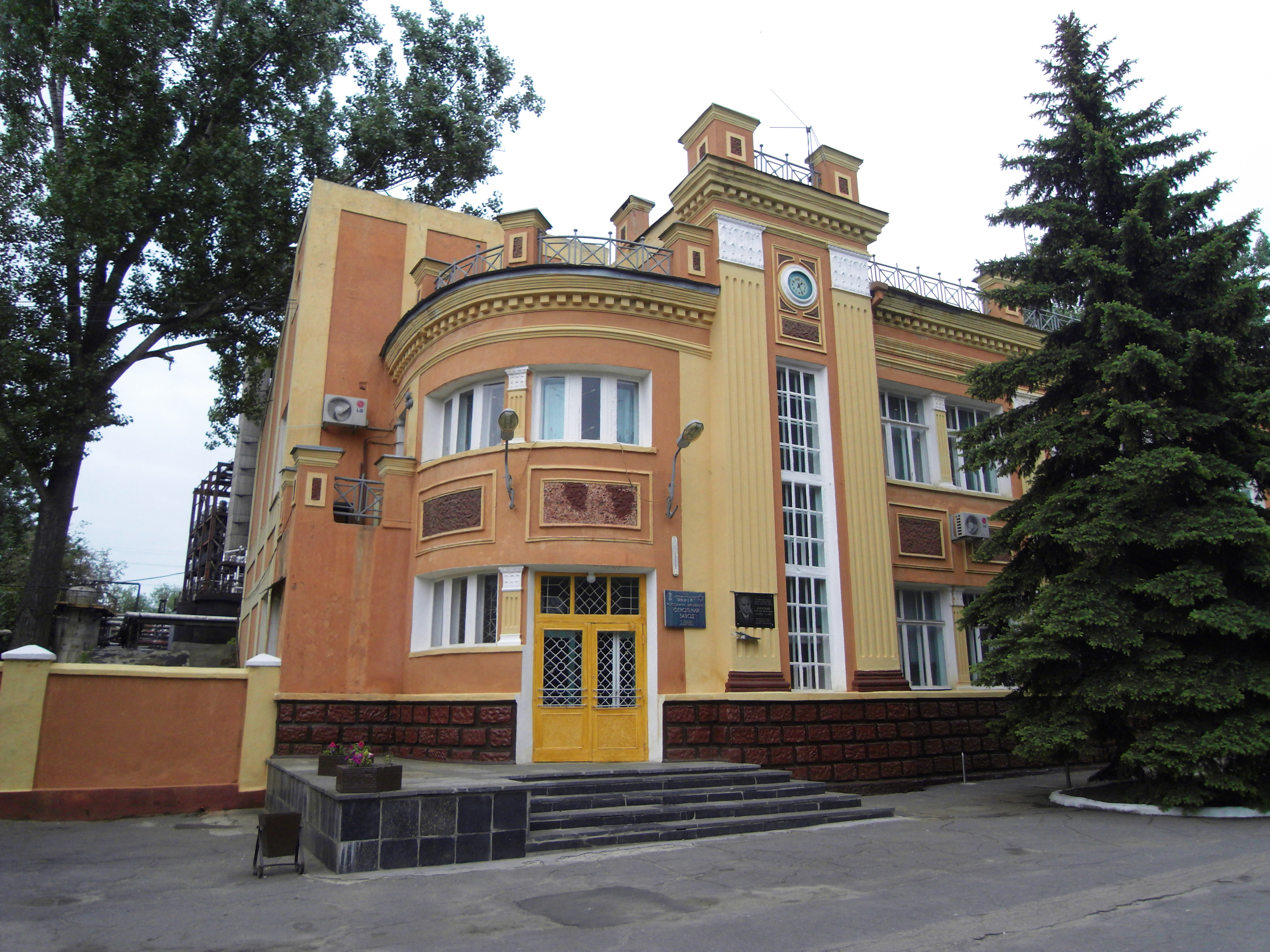
Dzerzhynsk phenol plant

=== Transportation ===
New York has the Fenolna passenger and freight train station of the Donets Railway, which connects the town with Sloviansk in the north and with Donetsk in the south.

== Demographics ==
Historical population

Year	Pop.	±% p.a.
1859	85	—
1908	1,493	+6.02%
1939	4,737	+3.79%
1959	5,285	+0.55%

Year	Pop.	±% p.a.
2001	11,927	+1.96%
2020	10,064	−0.89%
2024	1,940	−33.74%

As of the 2001 Ukrainian census, the town had a population of 11,927 people. Their self-reported native languages were:

- Russian 65.74%
- Ukrainian 33.95%
- Belarusian 0.12%
- Armenian 0.03%
- German and Polish 0.02%
- Romanian 0.01%

In 2021, the population was estimated at less than 10,000 inhabitants by local authorities.
