= DeepStateMap.Live =

Virtual map of the Russo-Ukrainian war

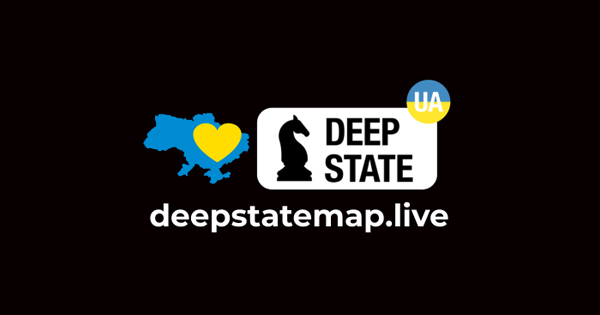

- Screenshot A view of the map of the Russo-Ukrainian war on 29 February 2024
- Website type: Open Source Intelligence; digital mapping
- Available in: 2 languages
- List of languages English, Ukrainian
- Founded: 24 February 2022
- Country of origin: Ukraine
- Creators: Roman Pohorilyi and Ruslan Mykula (Admins)
- Founders: Roman Pohorilyi and Ruslan Mykula
- Employees: ≈ 100 (for Deep State UA)
- Parent: Deep State UA
- Website: deepstatemap.live/en
- Commercial: No
- Registration: Absent
- Launched: February 24, 2022; 4 years ago
- Current status: Active

DeepStateMap.Live is an open-source intelligence interactive online map of the military operations of the Russian and Ukrainian armies during the Russo-Ukrainian war. The map was created on 24 February 2022, the day of the invasion, by the non-governmental and volunteer-led organization Deep State UA. It is updated regularly to reflect the current situation on the frontline, in military formations, and other major events of the war.

Before the Russo-Ukrainian war, Deep State UA originally focused on posting content related to global news and politics on the messaging app Telegram, where they created their first updating online map of a global conflict during the Taliban offensive in 2021. After the 2022 Russian invasion of Ukraine, DeepStateMap.Live separated itself from similar digital maps of the invasion after moving away from using a generic Google Maps background after a dispute with Google, allowing Deep State UA to design their own background and interactive map features. The map is currently sourced using data collected by the Ministry of Defense of Ukraine, as well as a blend of visual information and confirmations by other Ukrainian sources deemed reliable.

The map and other military analysis collected or made by Deep State UA has been cited by Ukrainian and international media outlets such as the BBC and Ukrainska Pravda. By February 2024, the map has been viewed more than one billion times, and has become the most popular digital map of the Russo-Ukrainian war in Ukraine, and one of the most popular digital maps of Ukraine globally, receiving an average of 900,000 views daily in August 2025.

== History ==
=== Deep State UA ===
"DeepState" in the general sense is something unusual and non-governmental, where the most important powerful events take place. We wanted to be something unusual in the field of providing information, that's why this idea with the name arose. And to date, it has been quite successfully chosen, which is very gratifying.

— Deep State UA team, October 2022 interview with Radio Free Europe in response to the question "Why was the project called that?"

The team which maintains the map today, Deep State UA, was created as a non-governmental organization in February 2020 by childhood friends Roman Pohorily, who was working on a law degree, and Ruslan Mykula, who was working in marketing. At this time, the organization focused on posting content on the messaging app software Telegram. This content often related to global news and politics, including events such as the COVID-19 pandemic, the Syrian civil war, George Floyd protests, the Second Nagorno-Karabakh War, and the 2021 Taliban offensive. It was during the 2021 Taliban offensive that the organization first experimented in map making; creating a digital map with a frontline that could be updated as the conflict unfolded. Map admin Mykula later recalled asking in an interview with the Ukrainian public broadcast Suspilne, "why not show the same thing in Ukraine?"

In the prelude to the Russian invasion of Ukraine, especially during the fall of 2021, the organization gradually shifted their focus towards entirely Ukrainian-specific news and analysis; reporting on hostilities and tracking the transfer of Russian military equipment and personnel to the Russia–Ukraine border. The Telegram channel, which only had around 200 subscribers before, began to see growth from the change in focus. A few hours before the beginning of the invasion, Deep State UA's Telegram channel exceeded 10,000 subscribers for the first time. The Deep State UA Telegram channel saw another large uptick popularity for their coverage and analysis during the beginning of Russia's invasion of Ukraine. The organization and its community at this time helped to refute large claims made early in the war by both sides; including the false sinking of the Russian frigate Admiral Makarov, and the destruction of all of Ukraine's Bayraktar TB2s.

=== Map history ===
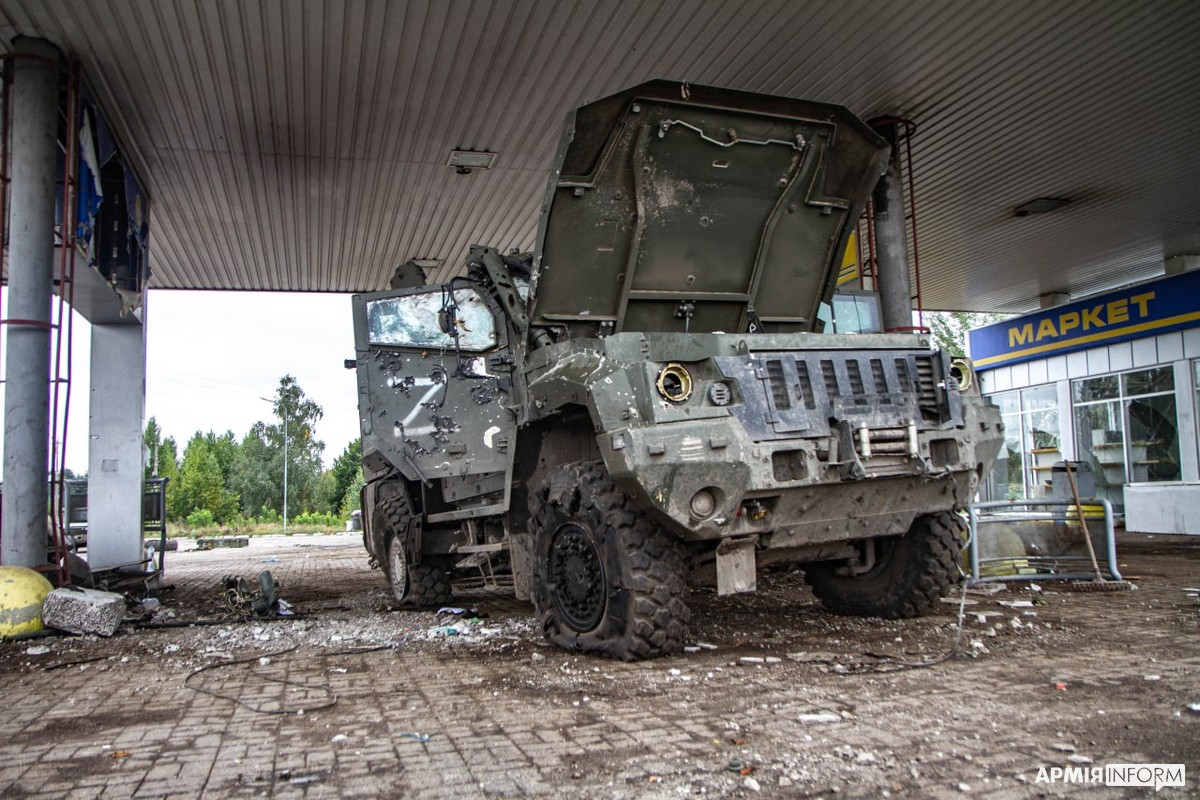
A destroyed Russian vehicle after the recapture of Izium, which led the map to reach its peak viewership of 120,000 visitors in 30 minutes

The online map of the 2022 Russian invasion of Ukraine was created the day Russia started their invasion on 24 February 2022. It was first developed using Google Maps as the backdrop because of the simplicity in drawing lines and sharing with others that came with the service. By the end of March however, Google blocked Deep State UA's use of their map for "violations of their rules of service", effectively shutting the website down. While the exact violation committed was not clearly explained, Google appeared to have issued the block as they did not want to host a website which could be a legal liability, especially after complaints from viewers to Google which stemmed from the map not always being updated with the most current information, and several prior digital attacks by hackers in Russia. After attempts over the following week to restore Google Maps on the website proved to be unsuccessful; Deep State UA, along with a programmer who had recently joined, launched their own map on 27 March, which they called "DeepStateMAP", which is what is currently in use. While the map became open to the public again on 26 April in an early state, the change resulted in the loss of all information from before 3 April.

After the change, the map greatly benefited from its new unique look from Google Maps and better functionality, making it more popular in Ukraine; so that by June 2022, it had become the 23rd most visited website in the country. The increase in server costs and drop in security that came with moving away from Google and running an independent map eventually lead to a major DDOS attack on 10 August 2022 against the map by hackers from Russia and various nations ideologically aligned with them, including China, Iran, Brazil, and North Korea. The map "suffered almost no [damage]," according to the Deep State UA team, and returned to normal functionality quickly. The map's popularity increased and reach its peak viewership of 120,000 visitors in 30 minutes during the recapture of Izium and Lyman by Ukrainian forces, with 7.9 million visitors being recorded by the end of the day, up from the approximately three million views the map normally received each day according to its authors. By October 2022, the map had been viewed more than 200 million times, making it the most popular digital map of the Russo-Ukrainian war in Ukraine, and one of the most popular digital maps of Ukraine globally.

Today, the Deep State UA team is headed by the founders Pohorilyi and Mykula, and is made up of approximately 100 paid employees and volunteers who work on their own time from home and communicate through Telegram, as the organization has no offices. While the two main outlets of information used by Deep State UA are their map and Telegram, they also report on YouTube and Twitter, but have a smaller following here because of the less amount of time they've been on the platforms. Since gaining popularity, the organization itself is funded in part by the Ukrainian government, but mainly from public donations, according to Mykula. Since 8 March 2022, the organization has raised viewer-gathered funds to help support Ukraine and its armed forces. It had gathered a total of over 3 million hryvnias (US$81,277.02) in donations by 22 April 2023. On 19 February 2024, another major DDOS attack took place against the map, but was able to be resolved within 18 minutes of starting. On 22 February 2024, the Deep State UA announced the map had reached one billion views since its launch, and in March 2024 that their Telegram channel had reached over 700,000 subscribers. In August 2025, it was reported the map receives around 900,000 views daily.

== Map characteristics ==
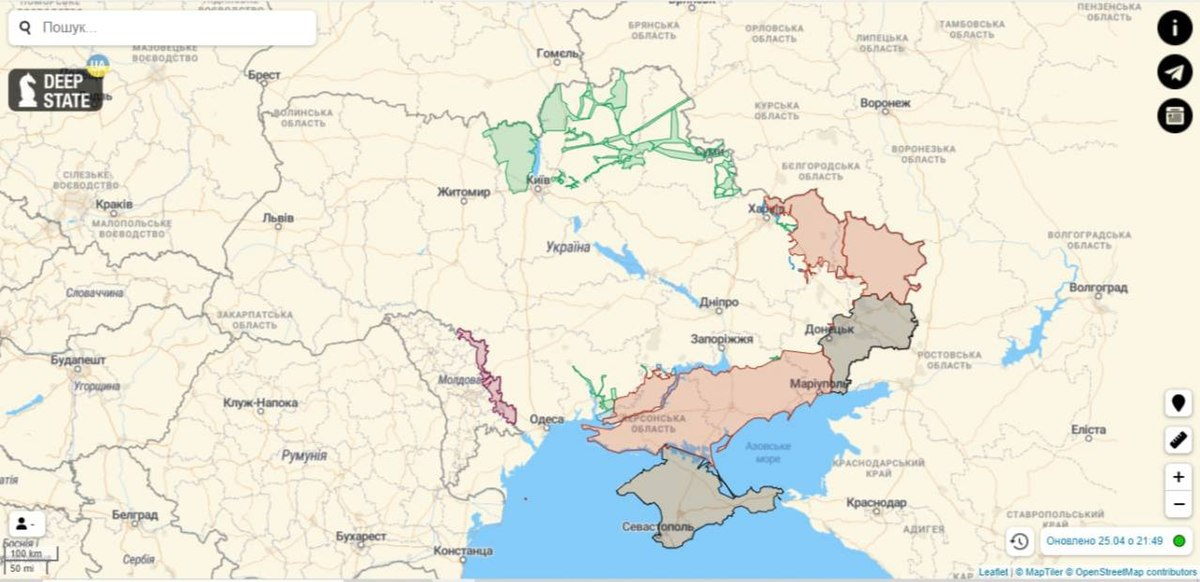
The map on 25 April 2022, depicting the old color scheme

The map is available to readers in English and Ukrainian, and uses red to mark the areas currently controlled by Russian forces, blue to mark the areas regained by Ukrainian forces less than two weeks previously or during the Kursk incursion, green to mark the areas regained by Ukrainian forces more than two weeks previously, pink to mark the areas that have been controlled by Russian forces since before the war began, gray to mark the areas with unknown status, and light red to mark areas outside of Ukraine which currently are under an occupation by Russia of other countries which could be considered controversial; such as for Transnistria, Karelia, Chechnya, Kaliningrad Oblast, Abkhazia, South Ossetia, parts of Pskov and Leningrad Oblasts which were considered as occupied Estonian and Latvian territories, and the Kuril Islands. When hovering over green regained areas; information from official sources, such as the General Staff of the Ukrainian Armed Forces, about the area's recapture is also sometimes displayed. Areas depicted as being regained by Ukrainian forces are only displayed if Russian forces stayed in the area for an extended period of time, and were not just passing through. Earlier versions of the map displayed dark red areas as black areas, but has since been re-colored.

Interactive features of the map include the ability to toggle icons representing the location of known Russian and Belarusian units and naval fleets, (Note: This feature was sometime later removed, with the only naval craft still shown on the map being the sunk Russian warship Moskva. An animation of Grogu will appear on the bottom right of the interface upon clicking the sunk Moskva icon, and by continuing to click the Grogu, an animation of the character "destroying" Russian units and headquarters will play until the map announces you completed the game.) alongside distinguishing arrows displaying their direction of attack. Icons to display Russian headquarters, airfields, major railroads under their control, and Russian-made trenches and fortifications in and outside Ukraine can also be displayed. Buttons located on the left side of the screen also display various information when pressed, including a statistics chart of Russian losses, a map layer of the weather in and around Ukraine, background radiation across Ukraine, the range of nuclear weapons, the range of various forms of weapons, and the locations of mystery fires in Russia and Ukraine within the last 48 hours. The feature to view the range of weapon systems in particular has been used by mayor of Dnipropetrovsk Oblast town Mezhova, Volodymyr Zrazhevsky, to gauge the threat of Russian strikes. Formerly, there was also a "pathogen mode" which displayed a blurred image of the current Russian troop concentrations in and around Ukraine.

On 2 July 2024, a major update to the map was launched nicknamed "DeepStateMap 2.0", which included a graphics update, added an offline mode, ability to toggle animations to reduce loading times, ability to draw on the map, ability to use keyboard shortcuts on computers, new weapons of which to view the range, and the ability to copy coordinates by clicking on the center of the map.

=== Versions ===
Deep State UA launched their first mobile version of the map on Google Play on 2 March 2023. While the release was intended to be done alongside an app for iOS, the organization faced difficulties with Apple, as they claimed the map had characteristics which could be offensive against Russians. Despite this, the map released on iOS about two months later on 29 April.

On 4 November 2024, Deep State UA launched an interactive map to track the voting results in each state during the 2024 US presidential election in real time. On 22 April 2025, an interactive map of Crimea was released to showcase the liberation of the Taurida Soviet Socialist Republic by the Ukrainian People's Army and Imperial German Army in April 1918 from the Bolsheviks during the Crimea Operation.

== Sourcing ==
For example, [some soldiers] say: "Can you not mark this zone or mark it red?" That's what happened to us with Izium forest. Then other soldiers wrote to us: "We are sitting here in red, redraw." And I say: "Your colleagues on the flank asked for it to be red. We know what the situation is." We are asked - we fulfill. Because safety comes first.

— Ruslan Mykula, October 2022 interview with Suspilne

According to map admin Pohorilyi, the sources used to put together the map include geolocated photo and video evidence published on social media, followers near the frontline who get in touch, and hundreds of Ukrainian soldiers from different units, who mainly are used to confirm or deny certain secure information. On 13 March 2024, this cooperation with the Ukrainian military was increased after a Memorandum of cooperation was signed between Deep State UA and the Ministry of Defense of Ukraine to ensure the exchange of current information to improve the map's accuracy. For information gathered solely by people who claim to be in the area, the map often waits until several similar reports are made if no visual evidence or confirmation by the General Staff of the Armed Forces of Ukraine is available. Due to prior propaganda and exaggerated claims, Russian sources are not taken into account when compiling the map, according to map admin Pohorilyi. Of the approximately 100 people who work for Deep State UA, 60 are tasked with verification of sources.

=== Factuality ===
On the one hand, it's great that we have this opportunity, trust, reputation, and that we were able to prevent all this, to draw attention to it. On the other hand, it is nonsense when projects like ours are needed to talk about these problems and prevent catastrophic consequences in this way.

— Roman Pohorilyi, December 2025 article by The Kyiv Independent, on the map's contributions in bringing attention to downplayed Russian advances

Being an Open Source Intelligence website and due to security reasons, the map updates with a slight delay in information of up to 2–3 days. As such, Deep State UA has cautioned against using the map to plan evacuation routes, combat areas, or undertaking in other sensitive and highly specific activities. In terms of OSINT reasons, in addition to natural delay, the gray zone on most lines of contact have increased as a result of Ukrainian manpower shortages and both sides increased use of drone warfare, making precise frontlines harder to definitely map. In terms of security reasons, delays to the map are made in situations where doing so would compromise Ukrainian positions on the ground, as seen during the first two days of the Kursk campaign, and when Ukrainian forces retake positions in frontline areas other Russian forces have not yet realized. While some Ukrainian soldiers have been displeased by the map for sometimes being too quick to update in these situations, Mykula claimed the Ukrainian military has commended the map for its balance in displaying information, "not to rush ahead to say too much and not to fall far behind". In relation to this, on 23 December 2024, Deep State UA reported they had received criticism from officials for displaying the encirclement of Ukrainian forces in Makarivka and Uspenivka on the map, something officially denied by the Khortytsia operational-strategic group. In response, Deep State UA stated "not all commanders-in-chief like the truth". Further denial of a map update came on 12 August 2025 during the Dobropillia offensive, where the Khortytsia operational-strategic group (now Dnipro operational-strategic group) denied the capture of any territory during offensive's initial breakthrough, something displayed on the map. The attention gained by the map's display of the breakthrough was later at least partially credited with the Ukrainian military's decision to deploy elite troops to contain the assault.

== Media attention and use ==
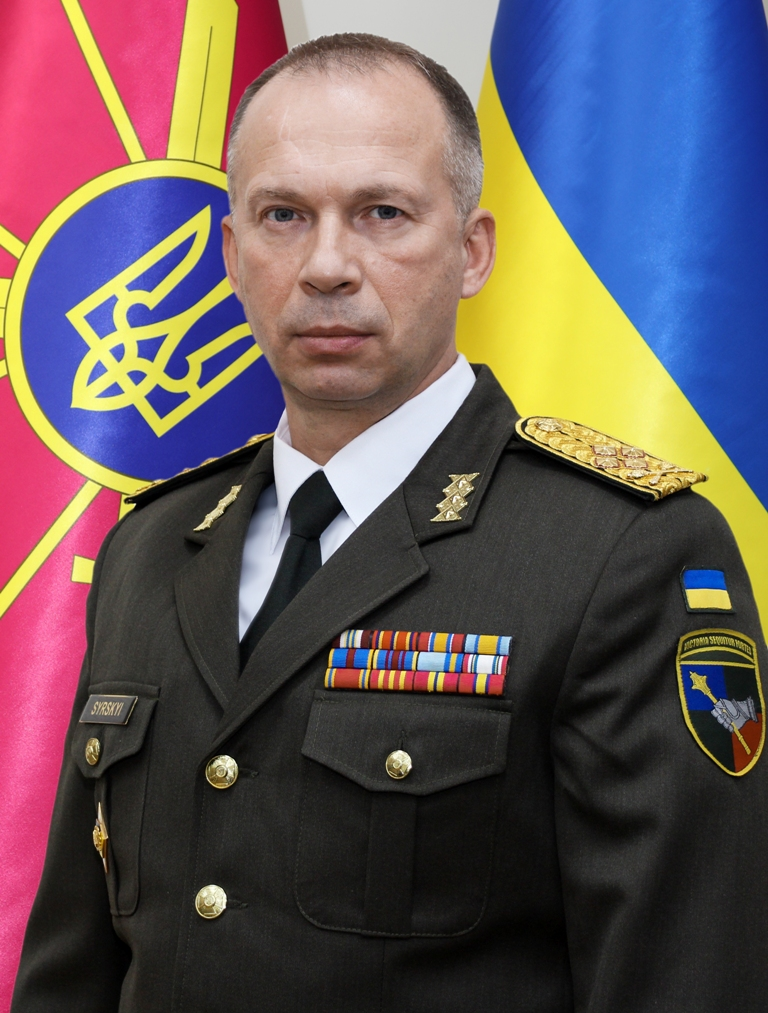
The top military commander in Ukraine, Oleksandr Syrskyi, has commented positively on the map's display threats to Ukrainian positions.

The map's use of open-source intelligence in the Russian invasion of Ukraine, as opposed to relying solely on military reports and on-the-ground journalism, has made it so information from the frontline can be relayed to the public as soon as Deep State UA sees fit. These near-instant updates in frontline information have made the map a staple for many Ukrainians, especially civilians and soldiers near the frontline. Likewise, the map has been referred to as "the undisputed leader [and] one of the most trusted sources" of those mapping the war by The Kyiv Independent, and "the go-to map in Ukraine" by military expert at the Foreign Policy Research Institute, Rob Lee.

Information produced by Deep State UA has also been cited by various media, including the Ukrainian TV news channel 24 Kanal, the British news broadcaster BBC News, the Ukrainian English-language online newspaper Euromaidan Press, the American business magazine Forbes, the American think tank Foreign Policy Research Institute, the Ukrainian online newspaper Ukrainska Pravda, and the Polish Russian-language television network Vot Tak. On November 25, 2025, the prediction platform Polymarket also briefly used the map as an overlay to their own "Polyglobe", which allows users to place bets on various global conflicts with visualization of where they were taking place. The following day, Deep State UA made a formal complaint on X stating their use of the map was unauthorized, and the overlay was removed shortly after.

The map has been cited by Ukrainian officials, including associate professor at the Kyiv School of Economics, Maksym Obrizan, mayor of Dnipropetrovsk Oblast town Mezhova, Volodymyr Zrazhevsky, adviser of the Office of the President of Ukraine, Oleksii Arestovych, the Minister of Defense of Ukraine, Oleksii Reznikov, and the Commander-in-Chief of the Armed Forces of Ukraine, Oleksandr Syrskyi.

News articles about the map itself or interviews with its creators have been notably conducted by the Ministry of Defence of Ukraine, the Ukrainian Territorial Defense Forces, 24 Kanal, Kyiv Independent, Lrytas.lt, Radio Free Europe/Radio Liberty, Suspilne, The New York Times, and the Ukrainian Independent Information Agency.

== See also ==
- Alerts.in.ua – Ukrainian online service to disseminate air raid alerts
- Liveuamap – Web mapping service
